= What You Say =

2023 song by YoungBoy Never Broke Again featuring the Kid Laroi and Post Malone

Song by YoungBoy Never Broke Again featuring The Kid Laroi and Post Malone

from the album Don't Try This at Home
- Released: April 21, 2023
- Length: 4:03
- Label: Never Broke Again; Motown
- Songwriters: Kentrell Gaulden; Charlton Howard; Austin Post; Jeffery Robinson; Jason Goldberg
- Producers: Cheese; Fresh Ayr; OzzySynthMaster

Music video
- "What You Say" on YouTube

"What You Say" is a song by American rapper YoungBoy Never Broke Again featuring Australian rapper the Kid Laroi and American musician Post Malone, appearing as the 24th track of the former's sixth studio album, Don't Try This at Home (2023). The song contains melodic verses from YoungBoy and Malone, whereas Laroi is heard in a rap tone (but still melodic). The song's title notes that the artists do not care about what people say about them.

== Composition ==
The song is seen to have a "pop appeal", a new genre for YoungBoy Never Broke Again. It is also noted that "the vocals hear see NBA YoungBoy offering some singing passages".

== Critical reception ==
HotNewHipHop's Alexander Cole noted that "we get to hear a bit of a softer side from NBA YoungBoy", and that "The Kid Laroi sounds great with his mix of flow and melody". Writing for Clash, Robin Murray wrote that the appearance of Post Malone is an "astute moves, and illustrates YoungBoy Never Broke Again's prowess".

== Music video ==
The song's official music video directed by Isaac Garcia arrived alongside the release of the song and the album. It sees YoungBoy, Laroi, and Post dancing in the snow in Utah, where YoungBoy is located on house arrest at the time of the song's release. It also features comic book-like animations and editing.

== Personnel ==
Credits and personnel adapted from Tidal.

Musicians

- Kentrell Gaulden – lead artist, songwriter, composer
- Charlton Howard – lead artist, songwriter, composer
- Austin Post – lead artist, songwriter, composer
- Jeffery Robinson – production, composer, songwriter
- Jason Goldberg – production, composer, songwriter
- OzzySynthMaster – production, composer

Technical

- Cheese – master engineering
- Cheese – mixing
- YoungBoy Never Broke Again – recording

== Charts ==
Chart performance for "What You Say"
Chart (2023)	Peak position
US Hot R&B/Hip-Hop Songs (Billboard)	47
