= I Know (YoungBoy Never Broke Again song) =

2022 song by YoungBoy Never Broke Again

Song by YoungBoy Never Broke Again

from the album The Last Slimeto
- Released: August 5, 2022
- Length: 2:31
- Label: Never Broke Again; Atlantic
- Songwriters: Kentrell Gaulden; Jason Goldberg; Eliot Bohr
- Producers: Cheese; Eliot Bohr

Music video
- "I Know" on YouTube

"I Know" is a song by American rapper YoungBoy Never Broke Again from his fourth studio album The Last Slimeto (2022). Produced by Cheese and Eliot Bohr, it peaked at number 46 on the Billboard Hot 100. The song serves as the introduction to the thirty-track album and sees YoungBoy rap on a mellow guitar beat about love and heartbreak throughout his life.

== Composition ==
The song is the only track on the album which features only one verse. The mellow song has a "plaintive guitar and eerie absence of drums."

== Critical reception ==
In a review of The Last Slimeto, Charles Lyons-Burt from Slant Magazine notes that the song "drips with melancholy, as YoungBoy begs a lover not to leave, knowing fully that she’s already gone." Robin Murray from Clash stated that the intro "has plenty of soul." HipHopDX's Scott Glasher noted that the track "sees YoungBoy waxing spirituals over gushing guitar strings" and that "his hallowing croons ring from the listener’s headphones, presenting him more like a mega-church preacher than a rapper."

== Music video ==
The song's official music video was released alongside the album's release. It sees YoungBoy dancing in front of a green screen while surrounded by fire which represents the burning of his heart.

== Personnel ==
Credits and personnel adapted from Tidal.

Musicians

- Jason Michael Goldberg – composer, songwriter
- Eliot Bohr – production, composer, songwriter
- Kentrell DeSean Gaulden – lead artist, songwriter, composer

Technical

- Cheese – mastering engineer
- Cheese – mixing engineer
- Cheese – recording engineer

== Charts ==
Chart performance for "I Know"
Chart (2022)	Peak position
Global 200 (Billboard)	195
US Billboard Hot 100	46
US Hot R&B/Hip-Hop Songs (Billboard)	13

== Certifications ==
Region	Certification	Certified units/sales
United States (RIAA)	Gold	500,000^{‡}
^{‡} Sales+streaming figures based on certification alone.
