= Lost Soul Survivor =

2022 song by YoungBoy Never Broke Again

Song by YoungBoy Never Broke Again

from the album The Last Slimeto
- Released: August 5, 2022
- Length: 2:35
- Label: Never Broke Again; Atlantic
- Songwriters: Kentrell Gaulden; Jason Goldberg; Andy Chen; Leonardo Mateus; Aman Nikhanji
- Producers: Andy Made The Beat; Bans; Cheese; Saucey Beats

Music video
- "Lost Soul Survivor" on YouTube

"Lost Soul Survivor" is a song by American rapper YoungBoy Never Broke Again from his fourth studio album The Last Slimeto (2022). Produced by Andy Made The Beat, Bans, Cheese, and Saucey Beats, it peaked at number 75 on the Billboard Hot 100. The song serves as the eighth track to The Last Slimeto and sees YoungBoy rapping with a fast flow about the struggles in his life.

== Composition ==
Robin Murray from Clash noted that the track is "submerged in effects." However, HipHopDX's Scott Glaysher noted that the track is a "prime example of these rap sermons."

== Critical reception ==
HipHopDX's Scott Glaysher noted that the track "is quite rhythmic and delivers YoungBoy's version of gangster rap psalms." Paul Simpson from AllMusic wrote "he switches between harder rapping and melodic crooning so frequently that one could easily mistake the songs for duets between different artists."

== Personnel ==
Credits and personnel adapted from Tidal.

Musicians

- Jason Michael Goldberg – production, composer, songwriter
- Andy Chen – production, composer, songwriter
- Leonardo Mateus – production, composer, songwriter
- Aman Nikhanji – production, composer, songwriter
- Kentrell DeSean Gaulden – lead artist, songwriter, composer

Technical

- Cheese – mastering engineer
- Cheese – mixing engineer
- Cheese – recording engineer

== Charts ==
Chart performance for "Lost Soul Survivor"
Chart (2022)	Peak position
US Billboard Hot 100	75
US Hot R&B/Hip-Hop Songs (Billboard)	25
