= 3860 =

Mixtape by Quando Rondo and YoungBoy Never Broke Again

Mixtape by Quando Rondo and YoungBoy Never Broke Again
- Released: November 25, 2022
- Length: 44:45
- Labels: Atlantic; Never Broke Again
- Producers: 17OnDaTrack; 808Melo; Aldaz; Ayo Bleu; Bankroll Got It; Blakevalid; BLK Beats; Camm; Cheese; CxbGoCrazy; Dmac; Droc; DVOSK; EJ Beats; Flowboyprod; Geo Vocals; Indyah; J Thrash on the Track; Juvy Catcher; Kutoff; LMC; Lonis; Lvl35dav; Martin Brown; Mekai B; Menace Beats; Pooh Beatz; Prod FranK; ReoN; Rio Leyva; Sébastien Graux; SephGotTheWaves; Sko Sound; Spacy; Swirv; Synco; Theevoni; TJ Produced It; vickyferribeats; Xclusive; Yakree

Quando Rondo chronology
Still Taking Risks (2021)	3860 (2022)	Recovery (2023)

YoungBoy Never Broke Again chronology
Ma' I Got a Family (2022)	3860 (2022)	Lost Files (2022)

Singles from 3860
- 1. "Give Me a Sign" Released: August 31, 2022; 2. "Cream Soda" Released: October 27, 2022; 3. "Keep Me Dry" Released: November 17, 2022; 4. "It's On" Released: November 21, 2022

3860 is a collaborative mixtape by American rappers Quando Rondo and YoungBoy Never Broke Again. It was released through Atlantic Records and Never Broke Again on November 25, 2022. The mixtape features a sole guest appearance from Lul Timm. Four singles supported the mixtape: "Give Me a Sign", "Cream Soda", "Keep Me Dry", and "It's On". YoungBoy's in-house producer and engineer Jason "Cheese" Goldberg and Quando's engineer, Jacoby “CxbGoCrazy” Cherry mixed, mastered, and recorded every track on the mixtape. The album also features production from many prestigious producers such as 808Melo, Bankroll Got It, Dmac, Droc, Pooh Beatz, Synco, and Yakree. The mixtape marks Quando's only project of 2022 and YoungBoy's seventh.

== Release and promotion ==
On August 30, 2022, following the death of Quando's close friend Lul Pab after both Quando and Pab were victims of a drive-by shooting, Quando and YoungBoy released the mixtape's first single, "Give Me a Sign", in memory of Lul Pab and Big Dump, as seen on the single's cover art. On October 4, 2022, Rolling Stone conducted an interview with Quando Rondo; in the interview, Quando spoke about the behind the scenes and making of the mixtape. On October 26, 2022, the mixtape's second single, "Cream Soda", was released. The single only featured vocals from Quando Rondo. On November 17, 2022, the mixtape's third single, "Keep Me Dry", was released following its announcement and tracklist reveal on November 16, 2022. The mixtape's fourth and final single, "It's On", was released on November 21, 2022, just four days prior to the release of the project.

== Artwork ==
The mixtape's artwork presents an animated version of Quando and YoungBoy with blue and green bandanas tied to a street sign making references to each of their gang affiliations. YoungBoy — on the left-hand side — has a "38" on the street sign, making a reference to the North 38th St in Baton Rouge, Louisiana; the street on which YoungBoy had grown up. The street was also used as inspiration for YoungBoy's other mixtapes, 38 Baby and 38 Baby 2. The green flag tied to the street sign references the colors of YoungBoy's 4KTrey gang. The reference regarding the green flags have also been used as inspiration for Never Broke Again's compilation, Green Flag Activity. Quando — on the right-hand side — has a "60" on the street sign, making a direct reference to the Rollin' 60s Neighborhood Crips which Quando has both rapped about and spoken about his affiliation with. The blue bandana also makes a direct reference to the Crips as they're heavily associated with the color blue.

== Controversy ==
According to reports, Quando Rondo dissed Lil Durk, King Von, and their respective association with gangs, most particularly in the first verse of the mixtape's fifth cut, "Want Me Dead." Quando begins his verse by taking shots at both King Von and his sister Kayla B, otherwise known as Kayla Bennett as he rapped: "Ha, my favorite opp dead, sister talk too much, no, I don't like the bitch/Lul Timmy rolled her brother up, got stepped on in some Nike kicks." The lyric refers to Von as his "favorite opp" and states that Von's sister, Kayla, talks too much, referring to several of her past interviews in which she speaks about the murder of her brother. Quando further goes into detail about the night of Von's murder as "Timmy," otherwise known as Lul Timm, the solo guest appearance on the mixtape is the alleged murderer of King Von. The diss received a mixed number of response from fans, many taunting Quando about the death of his friend Lul Pabb, others advocating the violent lyrics.

Furthermore, on the day of the project's release, Quando and YoungBoy received mild backlash from fans after there was a lack of promotion, this was soon followed by a response from YoungBoy where he stated that he and Quando had come to a mutual agreement to not release the project, however, Atlantic Records had gone behind the two artists' back and released the mixtape, uploading it to YoungBoy's official YouTube channel: I had to tell Quando don't nobody care as long as they making dollars off you I've begged for that tape to not be Released and quando respected my wishes/I talk to missionaries everyday inside my home who probably gone ask me about that tape that shit not sitting on top of my heart right but pay attention to what these people promote they are even and don't give a fuck about us." The release had led to YoungBoy deleting the mixtape from his YouTube channel as he disapproved of the lyrics after stating that he wants to "stop the violence."

== Critical reception ==
Professional ratings
Review scores
Source	Rating
AllMusic	2/5 stars

3860 received generally negative reviews from music critics. Paul Simmons from AllMusic stated that "the tape is hard as nails, with drill-influenced production and ruthless lyrics."

== Commercial performance ==
3860 debuted at number sixty-two on the US Billboard 200 chart, earning 14,397 album-equivalent units (including 329 copies in pure album sales) in its first week.

== Track listing ==
3860 track listing
No.	Title	Writer(s)	Producer(s)	Length
1.	"I Swear" (featuring Lul Timm)	Tyquian Terrel Bowman; Kentrell DeSean Gaulden; Timothy Leeks; Igor Mankushev; Jacoby Cherry	Spacy; CxbGoCrazy	2:37
2.	"It's On"	Bowman; Gaulden; Braylen Rembert; Christian M. Lonis; Jeremiah Thrasher; Traevon Isaiah Walker	Ayo Bleu; lonis; J Thrash On The Track; Xclusive	2:29
3.	"Casket Talk"	Bowman; Gaulden; Daniel Yenuen Aldaz Leander; David McDowell; Daniel Lebrun; Davood Nadimi Boushehri	Aldaz; Dmac; Droc; lvl35dav	3:07
4.	"Give Me a Sign"	Bowman; Gaulden; Joel Banks; Taylor Banks; Georgia Rose Boyden; Joseph Boyden	Bankroll Got It; Geo Vocals; SephGotTheWaves	2:49
5.	"Want Me Dead"	Bowman; Gaulden; Keshawn Lawson; Jack Richard Thierer	TJ Produced It; Yakree	3:10
6.	"Cream Soda" (performed by Quando Rondo)	Bowman; Jakob D. Hagemann; Andrii Oliinyk; Liam McAlister; Indyah McAlister	Flowboyprod; Indyah; Kutoff; LMC	3:36
7.	"No Mercy"	Bowman; Gaulden; Darryl Lorenzo Clemons	Pooh Beatz	3:13
8.	"Loaded"	Bowman; Gaulden; Jason Goldberg; Leburn; Sven Rafael Steenbergen; Rio Francesco Leyva	Cheese; Droc; 17OnDaTrack; Rio Leyva	2:32
9.	"Can't Compare" (performed by Quando Rondo)	Bowman; Clemons; Blair Frances Ferguson; Ernest Adams	Pooh Beatz; Blair; EJ Beats	2:12
10.	"Trophies" (performed by Quando Rondo)	Bowman; Cherry; Danny Voskoboynik; Victor Ferreira	CxbGoCrazy; DVOSK; vickyferribeats	2:27
11.	"Keep Me Dry"	Bowman; Gaulden; Goldberg; Martin Simpenzwe; Adnan Khan; Sebastien Julien Alfred	Cheese; Martin Brown; Menace Beats; Sébastien Graux	3:55
12.	"Million Dollar Kid"	Bowman; Gaulden; Cameron Holmes; Klimov Danil Alekseevich; Nikiforov Gleb Victorovich; sko sound	camm; Juvy Catcher; ReoN; sko sound	3:29
13.	"At the Top"	Bowman; Gaulden; Lawson; Terry Lynn Jones Jr.; Goo Bon Jeong	TJ Produced It; Gwapmade; Theevoni	2:33
14.	"Heat Tucked" (performed by Quando Rondo)	Bowman; Alexander Tsarng-Sheun Wu	Synco	2:48
15.	"My Friend"	Bowman; Gaulden; Andre Michael Loblack; Ellis Newton	808Melo; Swirv	3:04
16.	"Running Away from Home" (performed by Quando Rondo)	Bowman; Lewis Blake Pointer III; Mekai Barrientez; Frankie Frank Jr	Blakevalid; Mekai B; Prod Frank	2:01
Total length:				44:45

Sample credits

- "I Swear" contains a sample of "Le Ultime Occasioni - Reloaded Version" by DJ Fede, performed by Caneda, Fred De Palma, Jack the Smoker, Jake La Furia, and Primo Brown.

== Personnel ==
- Quando Rondo – vocals (1–16)
- YoungBoy Never Broke Again – vocals (1–5, 7, 8, 11–13, 15)
- Lul Timm – vocals (1)
- Jason "Cheese" Goldberg – mastering, mixing (1–16), recording (1–13, 15)
- CxbGoCrazy – mastering (4), mixing (4, 6), recording (1–4, 6–10, 11–16)
- Fabian Marasciullo – mixing (13, 14)
- David Devaney – assistant mixing (4)

== Charts ==
Chart performance for 3860
Chart (2022)	Peak position
US Billboard 200	62
US Top R&B/Hip-Hop Albums (Billboard)	24
