= Lost Files (YoungBoy Never Broke Again album) =

Compilation album by YoungBoy Never Broke Again
- Released: December 23, 2022
- Length: 61:26
- Label: Never Broke Again; Atlantic
- Producer: Abby "Samir" Urbina; Ayo E Go Krazy; Bans; BGSOUNDZ; BJ Beatz; BricksDaMane; Budda Beats; DeMoe; DJ Swift; Dmac; Dremusiq; Drum Dummie; Dubba-AA; Dun Deal; Earl on the Beat; GT; Guwap$; India Got Them Beats; Javar Rockamore; Lilkdubb; Louie Bandz; MarcussMuzik; Matt Cap; Mike Laury; NeilOnDaTrack; PlayboyXO; RellyMade; Smoke; StringzOnTheBeat; Trauma Tone; Wild Yella; Yung Lan

YoungBoy Never Broke Again chronology
| 3860 (2022) | Lost Files (2022) | I Rest My Case (2023) |

Lost Files is the second compilation album by American rapper YoungBoy Never Broke Again. It was released through Atlantic Records and Never Broke Again on December 23, 2022. The entire project was mixed by Fabian Marasciullo and is the first project of 2022 from YoungBoy to not include any production or engineering from his in-house producer and engineer Jason "Cheese" Goldberg. It also features production from many prestigious producers such as DJ Swift, Dmac, Drum Dummie, Dubba-AA, Dun Deal, Louie Bandz and Mike Laury. The mixtape marks YoungBoy's eighth and final project of 2022. The release of the album was presented as a Christmas gift to fans from YoungBoy and his label.

== Background ==
Despite the release not being backed by any official singles, "HTAFL" was uploaded onto YoungBoy's official YouTube channel under the name of "my happiness took away for life" on April 12, 2018. Additionally, on October 31, 2018, "Temporary Time" was exclusively released on YoungBoy's official SoundCloud page; it was confirmed to be a throwaway track from YoungBoy's December 2018 mixtape, Realer. Disregarding the previously released song, the album consists of exclusively leaked songs which have racked up hundreds of millions of streams on unofficial SoundCloud and YouTube accounts. The album was first announced by RapCaviar through their Instagram after they posted the album's tracklist.

== Commercial performance ==
Lost Files debuted at number 45 on the US Billboard 200 chart, earning 18,095 album-equivalent units (including 369 copies in pure album sales) in its first week.

== Track listing ==
Lost Files track listing
| No. | Title | Writer(s) | Producer(s) | Length |
|---|---|---|---|---|
| 1. | "HTAFL" | Kentrell Gaulden; Abby Urbina | Abby “Samir” Urbina | 2:56 |
| 2. | "I Thought" | Gaulden; Leonardo Mateus; Beau Glaser; Kyre Trask; Dean Harris Hall | Bans; BGSOUNDZ; Lilkdubb; StringzOnTheBeat | 3:25 |
| 3. | "Broken Hearted" | Gaulden; Brandon Russell; Gerail Harvey | BJ Beatz; RellyMade | 3:22 |
| 4. | "On A Boat" | Gaulden; John Carrington Jr.; Milan Modi | Trauma Tone; Yung Lan | 2:59 |
| 5. | "Hey Now" | Gaulden; Damion Williams; Aaron David Lockhart Jr.; Dennis Darrell Neal Jr. | DJ Swift; Dubba-AA; Louie Bandz | 2:44 |
| 6. | "Doctor" | Gaulden; Neil Harrison | NeilOnDaTrack | 2:50 |
| 7. | "Perc 10" | Gaulden; Jarrian Durrell Thompson | PlayboyXO | 2:58 |
| 8. | "Nurse" | Gaulden; Brain Anamayatana; Modi | KiloKeys Beatz; Yung Lan | 3:02 |
| 9. | "Ms. Alinda" | Gaulden; Williams; Deondre Davis; Neal Jr. | Dubba-AA; Dremusiq; Louie Bandz | 3:20 |
| 10. | "I Love It" | Gaulden; Javar Rockamore | Javar Rockamore | 3:15 |
| 11. | "Michael Corleone" | Gaulden; Charles Eric Driggers; David Cunningham; Isaac Earl Bynum | BricksDaMane; Dun Deal; Earl on the Beat | 1:54 |
| 12. | "4KT Freestyle" | Gaulden; India Williams; Trask | India Got Them Beats; Lilkdubb | 3:13 |
| 13. | "Temporary Time" | Gaulden; Barry Fields | Wild Yella | 2:49 |
| 14. | "Steady" | Gaulden; Gerrod Thomas; Marcus Gotch Jr. | GT; MarcussMuzik | 2:48 |
| 15. | "Time Out" | Gaulden; David McDowell; Tevin Revell | Dmac; Drum Dummie | 2:55 |
| 16. | "Rich Nigga" | Gaulden; Ebiem Nwaebiem | Ayo E Go Krazy | 2:32 |
| 17. | "Locked & Loaded" | Gaulden; Kevon Lewis; Trask; Gotch Jr. | Guwap$; Lilkdubb; MarcussMuzik | 1:43 |
| 18. | "Dangerous" | Gaulden; Williams; Michael Laury | Dubba-AA; Mike Laury | 3:06 |
| 19. | "Time Flow" | Gaulden; Matthew Joseph Caprio; Dyamond Hudson | Matt Cap; Smoke | 2:59 |
| 20. | "Murda Bizness" | Gaulden; Goldberg; Lebrun; Traevon Walker; Duhvinci; BJondatrakk | Cheese; D-Roc; Xclusive; Duhvinci | 3:41 |
| 21. | "Lose Me" | Gaulden; Zachary Thomas | Budda Beats | 2:55 |
| Total length: | | | | 61:26 |

== Charts ==
Chart performance for Lost Files
| Chart (2023) | Peak position |
|---|---|
| US Billboard 200 | 45 |
| US Top R&B/Hip-Hop Albums (Billboard) | 16 |
