= Put It on Me (YoungBoy Never Broke Again song) =

2022 single by YoungBoy Never Broke Again

Single by YoungBoy Never Broke Again

from the album Realer 2
- Released: September 6, 2022
- Length: 2:32
- Label: Never Broke Again; Atlantic
- Songwriters: Kentrell Gaulden; Jason Goldberg; Leor Shevah; Arjun Hasnain
- Producers: Cheese; Leor Shevah; 301.Arjun

Music video
- "Put It on Me" on YouTube

"Put It on Me" is a song by American rapper YoungBoy Never Broke Again from his mixtape Realer 2 (2022). It was produced by Cheese, Leor Shevah and 301.Arjun. The song went viral on TikTok.

== Composition ==
The song finds YoungBoy rhyming about street life and his relationship, in his signature flow.

== Music video ==
An accompanying music video was directed by Isaac Garcia. In it, YoungBoy is seen rapping in front of a white background, in the woods, and on top of a building. His girlfriend Jazlyn Mychelle makes a cameo and is shown to be pregnant.

== Charts ==
Chart performance for "Put It on Me"
Chart (2022)	Peak position
US Billboard Hot 100	63
US Hot R&B/Hip-Hop Songs (Billboard)	16

== Certifications ==
Region	Certification	Certified units/sales
United States (RIAA)	Platinum	1,000,000^{‡}
^{‡} Sales+streaming figures based on certification alone.
