= Black (YoungBoy Never Broke Again song) =

Promotional single by YoungBoy Never Broke Again

from the album I Rest My Case
- Released: January 4, 2023
- Genre: Rage rap
- Length: 2:08
- Label: Never Broke Again; Motown
- Songwriters: Kentrell Gaulden; Malachi-Phree Jasiah Pate; Powers Pleasant
- Producers: Jasiah; Kid Krazy; Powers Pleasant

Music video
- "Black" on YouTube

"Black" is a song by American rapper YoungBoy Never Broke Again, released on January 4, 2023 as a promotional single from his album I Rest My Case (2023). It was produced by Jasiah, Kid Krazy, and Powers Pleasant.

== Composition ==
Robin Murray of Clash wrote that the song shows an "explosive anthem, the kind of arena-level trap. Critics further note that the track "come[s] equipped with the buzzsaw synthesizers, sci-fi laser blasts, and pounding 808s."

== Music video ==
An accompanying music video was released on January 6, 2022. It finds YoungBoy inviting fans to his Utah home where they have a snowball fight and are seen dancing and getting "sturdy".

== Personnel ==
Credits adapted from Tidal.

- YoungBoy Never Broke Again – vocals
- Jason "Cheese" Goldberg – mastering, mixing
- Khris "XO" James – engineering

== Charts ==
Chart performance for "Black"
Chart (2023)	Peak position
US Billboard Hot 100	93
US Hot R&B/Hip-Hop Songs (Billboard)	39
