= Recovery (Quando Rondo album) =

Studio album by Quando Rondo
- Released: March 24, 2023
- Length: 57:23
- Label: Atlantic; Never Broke Again; Quando Rondo LLC
- Producer: 1Hellion; A17; AB; AG; Aldaz; Amart; Ayojimmy; Bankroll Got It; Camm; Clemsy Beats; Crevm Dian; CxbGoCrazy; Dabi.prod; DamnPablo; DJ Chose; Drac; Ehll Evans; Favor Beatz; FlexOnDaTrack; Fxlkes; Geo Vocals; Hawky beats; Hillz; JTBeatz; Juppybeats; KallinBad; Lemy; Lovesick; Lucent; lvl35dav; maxipejsek; NOLIMITSHAWN; RizzDopBeats; RocKy; SephGotTheWaves; Souljagotbandz; Soulm8; Steery Beats; Synco; vickyferribeats; WassupJP; We Love Heavy; Xclusive; Xyn

Quando Rondo chronology
3860 (2022)	Recovery (2023)	Here for a Reason: In The Darkest Time (2024)

Singles from Recovery
- 1. "Give Me a Sign" Released: August 30, 2022; 2. "Speeding" Released: January 22, 2023; 3. "Long Live Pabb" Released: January 23, 2023; 4. "Me First" Released: February 15, 2023; 5. "Tear It Down" Released: March 9, 2023

Recovery is the second studio album by American rapper Quando Rondo. It was released on March 24, 2023, through Atlantic Records, Never Broke Again, and Quando Rondo LLC. It features production from Quando's go-to producer CxbGoCrazy, alongside Bankroll Got It, Geo Vocals, Synco, Ehll Evans, lvl35dav, and SephGotTheWaves. It features a single guest appearance from YoungBoy Never Broke Again.

== Background and recording ==
The album is dedicated to Lul Pab, who was Quando's cousin who was shot and killed in August 2022. Upon the release of the album, Quando appeared in an interview with XXL in which he revealed the meaning behind the album's title, stating that it's titled Recovery because "that's something that everybody in this universe on planet Earth are going to have to face, a recovery from something. It don't matter what it is, how big or small. And I know that's something a lot of people can adapt to". Quando elaborated on the album later in the interview:

My main thing for this album was for when I put it out, people listen to it and sit back and notice that I moved on from a lot of things. I'm so ready for everybody else to move on.

== Release and promotion ==
"Give Me a Sign" with YoungBoy Never Broke Again, the album's lead single dedicated to the death of Quando's close friend Lul Pab was released on August 30, 2022. The album's second single, "Speeding", was released on January 22, 2023. "Long Live Pabb", the album's third single dedicated to the death of Lul Pab was released just a day later on January 23, 2023. Quando Rondo first teased the album in an Instagram post on February 8, 2023, in which he also announced an accompanying documentary. "Me First", the album's fourth single was released on February 15, 2023. The album's final single, "Tear It Down", was released on March 9, 2023, prior to the album's official announcement. He officially announced the album, along with its cover art and track listing, on March 10, 2023. The album's lyrical content differs from his typical gang- and street-related themes; on the album, he raps about the pain he has endured from seeing his friends die and the process of his mental recovery, which inspired the album's title. A day prior to the release of the album, on March 23, 2023, the official music video for "Where Would I Be" was exclusively released on YouTube.

== Track listing ==
Recovery track listing
No.	Title	Writer(s)	Producer(s)	Length
1.	"50"	Tyquian Terrel Bowman; Tril Wil; Will Boyette; Fokin Maxim; Raschepkin Artem; Ruslan Isaenya; Vladimir Skarednov	Favor Beatz; Hawky beats; Souljagotbandz; Steery Beats	3:48
2.	"Blame"	Bowman; Aaron Bigelow; Joseph Provencio	AB; WassupJP	2:52
3.	"Lost Ones"	Bowman; Jakub Jeřábek; Daniel Göpfert; Viktor Křístek; Ruben Luntungan; Victor Ferreira	1Hellion; Hillz; maxipejsek; Soulm8; vickyferribeats	3:19
4.	"Me First"	Tyquian Bowman; Jacoby Cherry; Lemuel Wilson	CxbGoCrazy; Lemy	2:58
5.	"Plenty Muscle"	Bowman; Wil; Justin Wolfson; Riley Scoble; Ferreira	Lucent; RizzDopBeats; vickyferribeats	3:36
6.	"Speeding"	Bowman; Daniel Aldaz; James Thierren; Davood Bousherhi	Aldaz; JTBeatz; lvl35dav	3:42
7.	"Cut You Off"	Bowman; Norman Payne	DJ Chose	1:49
8.	"Tear It Down"	Bowman; Wil; Dabeev Dmitrievich; Egor Sergeyevich; Antoine Banks	Ayojimmy; Dabi.prod	3:16
9.	"Vision"	Bowman; Cherry; Anthony Martinez; Pablo Buigues; Ryan Harroud	Amart; CxbGoCrazy; DamnPablo; Xyn	2:08
10.	"Where Would I Be"	Bowman; Cameron Holmes; Raymond Israel Cardenas; Ville dag Albin moström	Camm; Drac; RocKy	2:03
11.	"Heartaches"	Bowman; Wil; Isiah Folkes; Traevon Walker; Kevin Varol	Fxlkes; Xclusive; Lovesick	2:56
12.	"R.I.P. Phat Phat"	Bowman; Cherry; Walker; Felix Govaerts	CxbGoCrazy; Xclusive; FlexOnDaTrack	3:17
13.	"From the Bottom"	Bowman; Anthony Gargoura; Clemens Gabrysch	AG; Clemsy Beats	2:55
14.	"Counting Bands"	Bowman; Loren-Alekanekelo McGee; Alexander Tsarng-Sheun Wu	Ehll Evans; Synco	2:26
15.	"I Admit"	Bowman; Cherry; Anton Ingvarsson	CxbGoCrazy; We Love Heavy	2:47
16.	"Long Live Pabb"	Bowman; Cherry; Wilson	CxbGoCrazy; Lemy	2:21
17.	"Nightmare"	Bowman; Cherry; Abdullah Omar Ismael Almarsoomi; Yu Been	CxbGoCrazy; A17; Crevm Dian	2:51
18.	"No Scale"	Bowman; Cherry; Joshua Henley Jr.; Marcus Richard	CxbGoCrazy; NOLIMITSHAWN	2:18
19.	"Forever 16"	Bowman; Wil; Jasper Nino Cortez; Nikita Zuev	Juppybeats; KallinBad	3:12
20.	"Give Me a Sign" (with YoungBoy Never Broke Again)	Bowman; Kentrell Gaulden; Yoko; Joel Banks; Taylor Banks; Georgia Rose Boyden; Joseph Boyden	Bankroll Got It; Geo Vocals; SephGotTheWaves	3:12
Total length:				57:23

== Personnel ==
Credits adapted from Tidal.

- Quando Rondo – vocals (all songs)
- YoungBoy Never Broke Again – vocals (20)
- Joseph E. Colmenero – mastering, mixing (1–19)
- Fabian Marasciullo – mixing (1–3, 5–15, 17–19)
- CxbGoCrazy – engineering (1–20), mastering, mixing (16, 20)
- Jason "Cheese" Goldberg – engineering, mastering, mixing (20)
- David Devaney – mixing assistant (20)
