= Big Truck =

Big Truck may refer to:

- Big Truck (horse), an American Thoroughbred racehorse
- "Big Truck" (song), a song by American rapper YoungBoy Never Broke Again
- "Big Truck", a song by Coal Chamber from the album Coal Chamber, 1997
