= Decided 2 =

Mixtape by YoungBoy Never Broke Again
- Released: November 10, 2023
- Length: 61:42
- Label: Motown; Never Broke Again
- Producer: 2x.samuel; Ambezza; AskMe; Bans; Ben10k; Berge.af; Cheese; Dissan; D-Roc; Dunk Rock; Dvosk; EVRGRN; FxLKES; Gazbrazy; India Got Them Beats; JB Sauced Up; JBTheDon; Joe Reeves; Juppybeats; Kook Up; Lastwordbeats; Lex Luger; Loso; MalikOTB; Mike Wavvs; Poetic Justice; SauceBoy; Shaad K'Rounds; $hop With Ken; Supah Mario; Take a Daytrip; TnTXD; Tommy Parker; VenoTheBuilder

YoungBoy Never Broke Again chronology
Richest Opp (2023)	Decided 2 (2023)	I Just Got a Lot on My Shoulders (2024)

Singles from Decided 2
- 1. "Deep Down" Released: October 26, 2023; 2. "My Body" Released: October 27, 2023; 3. "Now Who" Released: October 27, 2023

Decided 2 (stylized on cover as DECIIDED) is the 21st solo mixtape by American rapper YoungBoy Never Broke Again, released through Motown and Never Broke Again on November 10, 2023. It serves as a sequel to his tenth mixtape Decided (2018), and marks his fourth project of 2023, following January's I Rest My Case, April's Don't Try This at Home, and May's Richest Opp. The mixtape features a sole guest appearance from Rod Wave and includes production from Dunk Rock, Lex Luger, Take a Daytrip and TnTXD alongside several other producers. Jason "Cheese" Goldberg, YoungBoy's in-house engineer and producer, acted as a producer on several tracks and mixed and mastered the entire project.

== Background ==
The mixtape has been teased for months prior to its release, alongside AI YoungBoy 3 the sequel to YoungBoy's highly acclaimed, AI YoungBoy 2. It was first teased on August 8, 2023, through an Instagram post from the Never Broke Again label page where the caption stated: "Top ( who ready for new album) AI 3 or Decided". YoungBoy, alongside fan pages who were connected with Kyle "Montana" Claiborne, a co-founder of Never Broke Again. On October 26, 2023, YoungBoy released the official music video for "Deep Down", however, the video was taken down within seconds due to copyright strikes, with YoungBoy claiming that YouTube is attempting to blackball him. It was re-uploaded to YouTube just minutes later, with the song's bio reading: "Surprise at 12......stay up". On October 27, 2023, YoungBoy released another two singles, "Now Who" and "My Body", while also announcing the release of the mixtape, enabling it for pre-order. Just two days prior to the album's release, on November 8, 2023, YoungBoy released yet another track titled "Guapi", a reference to the popular luxury streetwear brand of the same name who announced their clothing collaboration with YoungBoy weeks prior to the song's release. Following the release of the mixtape, YoungBoy released the official music video for "Guitar Hero" in order to boost the album and for it to gain recognition. On November 12, YoungBoy shared the official music video for the mixtape's fourth cut, "My Address Public".

The mixtape's official tracklist was supposed to be officially released on November 9, 2023, a day prior to the mixtape's release, however, due to several tracklist changes and unforeseen circumstances, it was released alongside the mixtape. However, the tracklist was available hours prior to the project's release on Amazon Music and Apple Music, increasing the hype for the project's release among YoungBoy fans as the project features highly anticipated snippets such as "Free Sex" and "Came a Long Way" alongside a guest appearance from Rod Wave which has been teased for months.

=== Other songs ===
Prior to the album's release, YoungBoy released two singles solely to YouTube which failed to appear on the final version of the project. On November 1, 2023, as a Halloween special, YoungBoy released a track titled "Return of Goldie" which sees him making references to the Jeepers Creepers film series, The Mack, and being compared to the late Tupac Shakur. Just days later, on November 4, 2023, YoungBoy released another track exclusively available on YouTube titled "Slime Examination", a track which "shows a good indication of where he's at in his life right now".

== Critical reception ==
Professional ratings
Review scores
Source	Rating
AllMusic	2.5/5 stars
Clash	5/10
HipHopDX	3.2/5 stars

AllMusic's Paul Simpson stated that the project is "another reflective, soul-searching set filled with cathartic lyrics about loneliness, family issues, and the struggle of being a public figure with an obsessive fan base". He stated that "it's long and exhaustive, but has a bit of stylistic range" and that it's "more atmospheric, vulnerable tracks to more aggressive, hardcore ones". Writing for Clash, Robin Murray stated that as this is YoungBoy's fourth full-length release of the year, he is "refusing to be hemmed in, he's gone again and again to the studio, exploring fatherhood, maturity, the poverty of his roots, and the limits of his aspirations". He wrote that the project "encompasses many of YoungBoy's faults, and his gifts" and notes that his "pen game remains illuminating". Concluding his review, he stated that "the record's second half is equally hit and miss" and that the project isn't "bad", however, "YoungBoy has so often walked this road before". Murray advised YoungBoy "to pause and re-assess, bring his ideas together, but before deciding his next step".

HipHopDX's Will Schube noted that Decided 2 is "floating on the highs of YoungBoy's infectious delivery while occasionally being bogged down by tedious raps and empty storytelling." He stated that the project is "at-times [a] very strong project, and a nice way to show the ways the MC has grown" since its predecessor, however, "with each sprawling YoungBoy release, the need for quality control only grows higher". Schube stated that the mixtape needs "just a bit more quality control and thorough editing" and that it's "merely fine, like too many of the artist's recent releases".

== Track listing ==
Decided 2 track listing
No.	Title	Writer(s)	Producer(s)	Length
1.	"Free Sex"	Kentrell Gaulden; Daniel Lebrun; Isiah Folkes; Gineau Johan	D-Roc; Fxlkes; Loso	2:58
2.	"Wrong"	Gaulden; Leburn; Julian Varlet; Jaylon Brown	D-Roc; Dissan; JBTheDon	3:02
3.	"Bop"	Gaulden; Kendale Carter	Shop with Ken	3:24
4.	"My Address Public"	Gaulden; Leburn; Jasper Cortez	D-Roc; Juppybeats; 2x.samuel	3:00
5.	"Life n Glory"	Gaulden; Aaron Hill; Michael Roberge; Malik Bynoe-Fisher	Lastwordbeats; Berge.af; MalikOTB	4:50
6.	"Came a Long Way"	Gaulden; Jason Goldberg; Jonathan Priester; Denzel Baptiste; David Biral	Cheese; Supah Mario; Take a Daytrip	2:43
7.	"Better Than Ever" (with Rod Wave)	Gaulden; Rodarius Green; Goldberg; Mathias Liyew; Lexus Lewis; Michael Washington Jr.; Thomas Lumpkins	Cheese; Ambezza; Lex Luger; Mike Wavvs; Tommy Parker	4:03
8.	"Play with Us"	Gaulden; Leburn; Cortez; Frederik Thomanek	D-Roc; Juppybeats; Gazbrazy	4:27
9.	"Now Who"	Gaulden; Hill; Roberge	Lastwordbeats; Berge.af	3:05
10.	"My Body"	Gaulden; Anton Simon Kunstmann; Daniel Lebrun; Jeremy Bradley	AskMe; D-Roc; JB Sauced Up	3:06
11.	"I'm a Demon"	Gaulden; Goldberg; Amman Nurani; Daniel Nduwimana; Ceary Houston	Cheese; Evrgrn; KookUp; VenoTheBuilder	2:51
12.	"Choppa Gizzle"	Gaulden; Carter	Shop with Ken	2:24
13.	"Bigger & Better"	Gaulden; Goldberg; Leonardo Mateus; Bynoe-Fisher	Cheese; Bans; MalikOTB	2:59
14.	"Guitar Hero"	Gaulden; Goldberg; Benjamin Wilson; Joe Reeves	Cheese; Ben10k; Joe Reeves	2:40
15.	"Deep Down"	Gaulden; Carter	Shop with Ken	3:22
16.	"Guapi"	Gaulden; Goldberg; Lucas DiFabbio; Rashaad Green; Thomas Horton	Cheese; Dunk Rock; Shaad K'Rounds; TnTXD	3:10
17.	"Freestyle"	Gaulden; Carter; Danny Voskoboynik; Phillip Campbell	Shop with Ken; Dvosk; Sauceboy	6:11
18.	"Don't Hurt Me"	Gaulden; Goldberg; India Williams; Jonathan Kliaman	Cheese; India Got Them Beats; Poetic Justice	3:34
Total length:				61:42

== Personnel ==
Musicians

- YoungBoy Never Broke Again – rap vocals
- Rod Wave – rap vocals (7)
- Berge.af – guitar (9)
- AskMeBeats – drums (10)
- JB Sauced Up – keyboards (10)

Technical

- Jason "Cheese" Goldberg – mastering, mixing (1–18), recording (6)
- YoungBoy Never Broke Again – recording (1–5, 7–18)
- Bobby Youngblood – recording (9, 10, 15)

== Charts ==
=== Weekly charts ===
Weekly chart performance for Decided 2
Chart (2023)	Peak position
US Billboard 200	17
US Top R&B/Hip-Hop Albums (Billboard)	5

=== Year-end charts ===
Year-end chart performance for Decided 2
Chart (2024)	Position
US Top R&B/Hip-Hop Albums (Billboard)	86
