= Big Truck (song) =

2023 song by YoungBoy Never Broke Again

Song by YoungBoy Never Broke Again

from the album Don't Try This at Home
- Released: April 21, 2023
- Length: 2:44
- Label: Never Broke Again; Motown
- Songwriters: Kentrell Gaulden; Jason Goldberg; Angelo Callari; Craig Scheuring; Brian Wolf
- Producers: Cheese; Callari; CraigShur; BWolf

Music video
- "Big Truck" on YouTube

"Big Truck" is a song by American rapper YoungBoy Never Broke Again, released on April 21, 2023, as the introductory track from his sixth full-length studio album, Don't Try This at Home.

== Critical reception ==
Writing for Clash, Robin Murray wrote that the intro sees YoungBoy do what "YoungBoy does best". Furthermore, he notes that "there's a gleeful cartoonish quality to the way the Louisiana artist approaches his craft". Revolt's Regina Cho notes that YoungBoy "raps about how he is not the one to be messed with".

== Music video ==
The song's official music video directed by YoungBoy Never Broke Again himself arrived a day following the album's release on April 22, 2023. The video sees "YoungBoy showing off his impressive collection of luxury cars" while he parades around his Utah home while on house arrest in camouflage overalls, making him match the dirt path and trees of his garden.

== Personnel ==
Credits and personnel adapted from Tidal.

Musicians

- Kentrell Gaulden – lead artist, songwriter, composer
- Jason Goldberg – production, composer, songwriter
- Angelo Callari – production, composer, songwriter
- Craig Scheuring – production, composer, songwriter
- Brian Wolf – production, composer, songwriter

Technical

- Cheese – master engineering, mixing
- YoungBoy Never Broke Again – recording

== Charts ==
Chart performance for "Big Truck"
Chart (2023)	Peak position
US Billboard Hot 100	100
US Hot R&B/Hip-Hop Songs (Billboard)	28
