= 3800 Degrees =

2022 album by YoungBoy Never Broke Again

Mixtape by YoungBoy Never Broke Again
- Released: October 7, 2022
- Genre: Trap; gangsta rap
- Length: 33:49
- Label: Never Broke Again; Atlantic
- Producer: 1MercyBeatz; A1 Rock; Bans; Cheese; Desro; DrellOnTheTrack; Drum Dummie; Evertime; DoppyBeatz; Fasbeats; India Got Them Beats; JahDaGod; JayMPR; Khris James; KP on the Beat; Leor Shevah; lvl35dav; MarcussMuzik; skeeo!; TayTayMadeIt; TJ Produced It; Vadebeatz; Vintage Rippah; Wheezy

YoungBoy Never Broke Again chronology
Realer 2 (2022)	3800 Degrees (2022)	Ma' I Got a Family (2022)

3800 Degrees is the eighteenth solo mixtape by American rapper YoungBoy Never Broke Again. It was released through Never Broke Again & Atlantic Records on October 7, 2022. The album features guest appearances from E-40, Mouse on tha Track, and Shy Glizzy. The mixtape is thought to pay homage to Juvenile's 1998 400 Degreez and Lil Wayne's 2002 500 Degreez. YoungBoy's in-house producer Jason "Cheese" Goldberg mixed, mastered, and engineered every track on the mixtape. The album also features production from many prestigious producers such as Drum Dummie, JahDaGod, Leor Shevah, TayTayMadeIt, and Wheezy. The mixtape marks his fourth solo project in 2022, as well as his fifth overall.

== Background ==
In September 2022, Youngboy Never Broke Again released the mixtape Realer 2, which peaked at number 6 on the Billboard 200. He announced the release of 3800 Degrees, his third project released in 2 months, via his YouTube channel stating, "To whom stabbed me in my back laughing like me being counted out funny—it's all good." On Instagram he added, "I just need everyone to go against me, I need the energy."

== Artwork ==
The artwork is presented as a Pen and Pixel old-school cover art, paying homage to the artwork of Juvenile's 400 Degreez. It shows YoungBoy in front of the Horace Wilkinson Bridge while gripping several chains, all while surrounded by fire. Street signs for Chippewa St & N 38th St can also be seen, paying homage to YoungBoy's hometown.

== Critical reception ==
Professional ratings
Review scores
Source	Rating
AllMusic	3.5/5 stars
Pitchfork	7.8/10

3800 Degrees received generally positive reviews from critics. Paul Simpson from AllMusic stated that "[3800 Degrees] sounds like it could've come out on Cash Money circa 2000." The review was concluded as Simpson stated that the mixtape consists "of concise, aggressive blasts of energy," and "is one of YoungBoy's more potent efforts." Nadine Smith from Pitchfork wrote that "3800 Degrees is more concise than many of YoungBoy's frequently meandering albums. With its compact style and classic sound, it is more critic-friendly and more appealing to old head haters." Smith felt that while "He's not always fast or especially clever in his wordplay", "YoungBoy's bars are frequently dense, delivered with an almost demonic energy; he crams his words into spaces where other rappers might need a breath." Concluding the review, Smith noted, "3800 Degrees is a culmination of—and a direct statement about—his ethos as an artist and individual. The surface may change, but the hustle at the heart of it all is timeless."

Raphael Helfand of The Fader noted that while the mixtape is "far from Youngboy's most impressive project to date", it proves that the rapper can release a better project a month "than most could make in a year".

=== Year-end lists ===
Select year-end rankings of 3800 Degrees
Publication	List	Rank	Ref.
Complex	The Best Albums of 2022	49	

== Commercial performance ==
3800 Degrees debuted at number twelve on the US Billboard 200 chart, earning 24,437 album-equivalent units (including 443 copies in pure album sales) in its first week.

== Track listing ==
3800 Degrees track listing
No.	Title	Writer(s)	Producer(s)	Length
1.	"Back on My Feet"	Kentrell Gaulden; Tevin Revell; Davood Nadimi Boushehri	Drum Dummie; lvl35dav	3:12
2.	"Won't Step on Me"	Gaulden; Samuel Thanni; India Williams; JayMPR; Leor Shevah	Khris James; India Got Them Beats; JayMPR; Leor Shevah	3:37
3.	"Pimpin a Bitch"	Gaulden; Thanni; Eliot Guillory II	Khris James; Vintage Rippah	2:29
4.	"Handle One"	Gaulden; Thanni; Karionne Payton; Jarvis Adams Jr.	Khris James; KP on the Beat; JahDaGod	2:21
5.	"Choppa on My Shoulda"	Gaulden; Thanni; Boushehri; Kendrell Mattox; Fedor Sommerfeld; 1MercyBeatz	Khris James; lvl35dav; DrellOnTheTrack; Fasbeats; 1MercyBeatz	2:33
6.	"It Could Go"	Gaulden; Jason Goldberg; Leonardo Mateus; Vincent Desrosiers; Eeti Jedi Justus Erätuli	Cheese; WassupBans; Desro; Evertime	2:04
7.	"Ampd Up" (featuring Mouse on tha Track)	Gaulden; Thanni; Marcus Gotch Jr.; Denis Barszcz	Khris James; MarcussMuzik; A1 Rocky	2:46
8.	"Head Busted"	Gaulden; Seth Love; Kapembwa Yamba	DoppyBeatz; Skeeo!	2:16
9.	"No Alarm"	Gaulden; David Boonpetch	Vadebeatz	2:06
10.	"Hard" (featuring Shy Glizzy)	Gaulden; Marquis Amonte King; Keshawn Lawson	Khris James; TJ Produced It	2:48
11.	"More Wheezy"	Gaulden; Wesley Tyler Glass	Wheezy	2:25
12.	"Thug Nigga Story" (featuring E-40)	Gaulden; Earl Tywone Stevens Sr.; Tavian Carter	TayTayMadeIt	2:56
13.	"With Us"	Gaulden; Goldberg; Mattox; 1MercyBeatz	Cheese; DrellOnTheTrack; 1MercyBeatz	2:16
Total length:				33:49

== Personnel ==
Credits adapted from Tidal.

- Jason "Cheese" Goldberg – mastering, mixing, recording (6, 11, 13), additional engineer (1–5, 7–10, 12)
- Khris James – mastering, mixing, recording (1–5, 7–10, 12)

== Charts ==
Chart performance for 3800 Degrees
Chart (2022)	Peak position
US Billboard 200	12
US Top R&B/Hip-Hop Albums (Billboard)	6
