= From the Bayou =

Mixtape by YoungBoy Never Broke Again and Birdman
- Released: December 10, 2021
- Label: Atlantic; Cash Money; Republic; Never Broke Again
- Producer: 30 Roc; 6element; 808Iden; 80Mac; Ain'tShiSweet; Andy R; Bapsxx; Buddah Bless; Cheese; Daniboi; Martin Brown (HamSquad Records); Dex Is Real; Dmac; Drum Dummie; Fizzle; GhosTTown; Hurboy AG; HZRD; Julia Lewis; Martin Brown; Max Merlin; Murda Beatz; Nom; Shawn Passed; Slim Pharaoh; Smokescreen; Timmy da Hitman; TnTXD; Yakree; Zay Takken

YoungBoy Never Broke Again chronology
Sincerely, Kentrell (2021)	From the Bayou (2021)	Colors (2022)

Birdman chronology
Number One Stunna / Birdman Collabs (2021)	From the Bayou (2021)

From the Bayou is a collaborative mixtape by American rappers YoungBoy Never Broke Again and Birdman. It was released through Atlantic Records, Cash Money Records, Republic Records, and Never Broke Again on December 10, 2021. Production was handled by 808Iden, TnTXD, Yakree, Timmy da Hitman, Drum Dummie, Dmac, Andy R, Buddah Bless, Shawn Passed, 30 Roc, Cheese, 80Mac, 6element, Ain'tShiSweet, HZRD, Bapsxx, Hurtboy AG, Fizzle, Julia Lewis, Brown, GhosTTown, Smokescreen, Murda Beatz, Slim Pharaoh, Merlin, Zay Takken, Dex Is Real, Daniboi, and Nom. The title of the mixtape refers to both artists' home state of Louisiana, in which YoungBoy is from Baton Rouge and Birdman is from New Orleans. It also marks the first project that YoungBoy has released since he was released from prison in his home state in late October 2021 after being arrested due to gun charges in March 2021.

== Release and promotion ==
YoungBoy and Birdman were originally set to release From the Bayou on March 22, 2018, but this did not happen for unknown reasons. Around the same time of its original announcement, Birdman revealed the cover art and the then-tracklist. However, the mixtape was pushed back more than 3 1/2 years for unknown reasons. On November 30, 2021, Birdman announced the release date of the mixtape of December 3, 2021, with an updated tracklist, but the mixtape was not released on that date and was released exactly one week later.

=== Songs ===
Before the release of From the Bayou, YoungBoy released a few songs from the mixtape to his YouTube channel, which were not officially released. The first visual was for "Safe then Sorry", which was released on November 23, 2021. He then released a combined music video for "Heart & Soul" and "Alligator Walk" on December 2, 2021. The final unofficial song with a music video was "Black Ball", which was released on December 6, 2021. All songs were only performed by YoungBoy even though Birdman is credited on every song from the mixtape.

== Critical reception ==
Professional ratings
Review scores
Source	Rating
AllMusic	3/5 stars
Pitchfork	6.4/10

Writing for AllMusic, Paul Simpson felt that "while Birdman executive produced the project and appears on a handful of tracks, mostly at the beginning, the mixtape largely feels like a YoungBoy solo release, and delivers what fans of the highly prolific artist have come to expect", citing YoungBoy's "generally intense and volatile" raps, which occasionally "show a more vulnerable side". Stephen Kearse of Pitchfork similarly stated that while "Birdman's presence is largely intrusive on the pair's joint project", "it's YoungBoy's versatility that keeps the album afloat" and "for most of its runtime, the tape centers YoungBoy, who croons, yelps, and wails with his usual intensity and anguish, sharing glimpses of his life under house arrest after another jail bid", "but YoungBoy's caterwauling only barely conceals the emptiness of the project", adding that "although Birdman postures as a mentor and fellow artist inspired by his young partner's talent and drive, he is foremost an investor, and YoungBoy stock is hot". Writing for Revolt, DJ First Class felt that the mixtape's "thoroughness cannot be denied". Shawn Grant of The Source opined that the songs on the mixtape see YoungBoy and Birdman "fusing magnetically melodic hooks with diamond-encrusted lyrical flexes".

== Track listing ==
From the Bayou track listing
No.	Title	Writer(s)	Producer(s)	Length
1.	"100 Rounds"	Kentrell Gaulden; Bryan Williams; Aiden Williams; Thomas Horton; Jack Thierer; Timmy da Hitman	808Iden; TnTXD; Yakree; Timmy da Hitman	2:25
2.	"We Ride"	Gaulden; B. Williams; Tevin Revell	Drum Dummie	3:06
3.	"Choppa Boy"	Gaulden; B. Williams; Horton; David McDowell; Andrej Marko	TnTXD; Dmac; Andy R	2:51
4.	"Open Arms"	Gaulden; B. Williams; Tyron Douglas, Sr.	Buddah Bless	2:17
5.	"Alligator Walk"	Gaulden; Shawn Passed	Passed	2:24
6.	"The Bigger End"	Gaulden; Samuel Gloade; Jason Goldberg; 80Mac	30 Roc; Cheese; 80Mac	3:02
7.	"Young Stunna"	Gaulden; Goldberg; 6element; Ain'tShiSweet	Cheese; 6element; Ain'tShiSweet	3:25
8.	"Safe then Sorry"	Gaulden; Goldberg; Vilyam Vardumyan; Alexander Baptist; Aaron Gilfenbain	Cheese; HZRD; Bapsxx; Hurtboy AG	2:22
9.	"Heart & Soul"	Gaulden; Goldberg; Joshua Goldenberg; Julia Lewis	Cheese; Fizzle; Lewis	3:49
10.	"How Ya Kno"	Gaulden; Goldberg; Matthew McQueen; Martin Brown	Cheese; Smokescreen; Martin Brown (HamSquad Records)	2:51
11.	"Achievements"	Gaulden; Shane Lindstrom; Mattias Ringleb; Max Merlin; Goldberg	Murda Beatz; Slim Pharaoh; Merlin; Cheese	3:22
12.	"Black Ball"	Gaulden; Goldberg; Zay Takken; Dexter Randall; Daniboi	Cheese; Takken; Dex Is Real; Daniboi	3:09
13.	"Stuck with Me"	Gaulden; B. Williams; Goldberg; McQueen; Nomdo de Heer	Cheese; Smokescreen; Nom	2:40
Total length:				37:52

Notes

- "Alligator Walk", "The Bigger End", "Young Stunna", "Safe then Sorry", "Heart & Soul", "How Ya Know", "Achievement", and "Black Ball" are solely performed by YoungBoy Never Broke Again although every song on the mixtape is credited to him and Birdman.

== Charts ==
=== Weekly charts ===
Chart performance for From the Bayou
Chart (2021)	Peak position
US Billboard 200	19
US Top R&B/Hip-Hop Albums (Billboard)	9

=== Year-end charts ===
2022 year-end chart performance for From the Bayou
Chart (2022)	Position
US Top R&B/Hip-Hop Albums (Billboard)	88
