= Realer 2 =

2022 album by YoungBoy Never Broke Again

Mixtape by YoungBoy Never Broke Again
- Released: September 6, 2022
- Length: 39:46
- Label: Never Broke Again; Atlantic
- Producer: 301.Arjun; AKel; Amineskkrt; Bans; BeatsByMAX; BeatsbyTrain; BrandoBeatz; Cocobeatszn; Cheese; DannyGotThatJuice; Daysix; D-Roc; Drum Dummie; Duhvinci; FlexOnDaTrack; JB Sauced Up; Jkei; Khris James; Leor Shevah; London on da Track; MalikOTB; Mario Beats; Nuki; ProdSkolo; Produced by Jb; Red Jon; skeeo!; TnTXD; Tre Gilliam; TWTbeats; Zay Tekken

YoungBoy Never Broke Again chronology
The Last Slimeto (2022)	Realer 2 (2022)	3800 Degrees (2022)

Singles from Realer 2
- 1. "Purge Me" Released: September 4, 2022

Realer 2 is the seventeenth solo mixtape by American rapper YoungBoy Never Broke Again. It was released through Never Broke Again and Atlantic Records on September 6, 2022. The mixtape features a guest appearance from the mother of YoungBoy's child, Jaz. The mixtape is a sequel to YoungBoy's December 2018 mixtape, Realer. YoungBoy's in-house producer Jason "Cheese" Goldberg mixed, mastered, and engineered every track on the mixtape. The album also features production from many prestigious producers such as Daysix, D-Roc, Drum Dummie, Jason "Cheese" Goldberg, Khris James, London on da Track, and TnTXD.

== Release and promotion ==
On September 4, 2022, YoungBoy released the promotional single, "Purge Me", alongside the official music video, exclusively to his YouTube channel. On September 5, 2022, the mixtape was first teased by YoungBoy's mother Sherhonda Gaulden via an Instagram story where she simply wrote "Realer 2 mixtape tonight." Again confirmed to be released on the night of September 5, 2022, DJ Akademiks:

"Breaking: NBA Youngboy deactivates his Instagram page. I talked to him and asked why… He said ‘Realer 2’ is dropping tonight!!!!"

— @Akademiks

Despite all of the confirmations, the mixtape did not release as planned on September 5, 2022. However, on September 6, 2022, YoungBoy randomly released the mixtape exclusively to his YouTube. It was later distributed to all digital streaming platforms by Atlantic Records on behalf of Never Broke Again on September 7, 2022.

== Critical reception ==
Professional ratings
Review scores
Source	Rating
AllMusic	2.5/5 stars

Realer 2 received mixed reviews from music critics. Paul Simpson from AllMusic compares Realer 2 to YoungBoy's previous album The Last Slimeto as "relatively low-key," referring to the majority of the tracks as "aggressive, unhinged ragers or more introspective cuts." Simpson suggests that the project is a throwaway as he says, "YoungBoy doesn't do much on this release that he hasn't already done several times before."

== Commercial performance ==
Realer 2 debuted at number 71 on the US Billboard 200 after a three-day period of tracking, with 12,000 album-equivalent units in its first week. The mixtape peaked at number six on the chart, earning an additional 39,000 units. This became YoungBoy's eleventh US top-ten charting project, and the fourth of 2022, making him the only artist to chart four projects in the top ten in 2022.

== Track listing ==
Realer 2 track listing
No.	Title	Writer(s)	Producer(s)	Length
1.	"Put It on Me"	Kentrell Gaulden; Jason Goldberg; Leor Shevah; Arjun Hasnain	Cheese; Leor Shevah; 301.Arjun	2:32
2.	"Boot Up"	Gaulden; Goldberg; Aaron Hill; Daniel Lebrun; Max Leone	Cheese; Droc; BeatsByMAX	2:25
3.	"Dangerous Love"	Gaulden; Goldberg; LeBrandon M. Robinson	Cheese; BrandoBeatz	3:51
4.	"Bloody Night"	Gaulden; Goldberg; skeeo!	Cheese; skeeo!	2:59
5.	"I Don't Like It"	Gaulden; Goldberg; Shevah; Jeremy Bradley	Cheese; Leor Shevah; JB Sauced Up	2:46
6.	"Tell Me"	Gaulden; Goldberg; Lebrun; Allen Michael Kelly; Frank Dante Gilliam III; Mario Beats	Cheese; Droc; Akel; Tre Gilliam; Mario Beats	3:17
7.	"Shotta Soul"	Gaulden; Samuel Thanni; Tevin Revell; Dan Cordero	Khris James; Drum Dummie; DannyGotThatJuice	2:34
8.	"Fresh Prince of Utah"	Gaulden; Goldberg; Kostas Latos; Adam Janeček; Thomas Therrien	Cheese; Nuki; Daysix; TWTbeats	2:46
9.	"Never Lie"	Gaulden; Goldberg; Robinson	Cheese; BrandoBeatz	2:19
10.	"DentHead"	Gaulden; Goldberg; Lebrun; Nathan Alemu; BeatsbyTrain	Cheese; Droc; Duhvinci; BeatsbyTrain	2:23
11.	"Poppin Shit" (featuring Jaz)	Gaulden; Jazlyn MyChelle; Goldberg; Red Jon; Thomas Horton; Joel Ruiz Anguita; Justin Bradbury	Cheese; Red Jon; TnTXD; Jkei; Produced by Jb	1:51
12.	"I'm the One"	Gaulden; Thanni; Lebrun; ProdSkolo; Zay Tekken	Khris James; Droc; ProdSkolo; Zay Tekken	2:30
13.	"Survive"	Gaulden; Goldberg; Malik Bynoe-Fisher; Leonardo Mateus	Cheese; MalikOTB; Bans	2:36
14.	"You Knew"	Gaulden; London Tyler Holmes	London on da Track	2:41
15.	"Purge Me"	Gaulden; Goldberg; Horton; Saad Ghallab; Amine Souiyate; Felix Govaerts	Cheese; TnTXD; Cocobeatszn; Amineskkrt; FlexOnDaTrack	2:16
Total length:				39:45

== Personnel ==
Credits adapted from Tidal.

- Jason "Cheese" Goldberg – mastering, mixing, recording (1–15)

== Charts ==
=== Weekly charts ===
Chart performance for Realer 2
Chart (2022)	Peak position
US Billboard 200	6
US Top R&B/Hip-Hop Albums (Billboard)	2

=== Year-end charts ===
2022 year-end chart performance for Realer 2
Chart (2022)	Position
US Top R&B/Hip-Hop Albums (Billboard)	78
