= Ma' I Got a Family =

YoungBoy Never Broke Again album

Ma' I Got a Family (A Gangsta Grillz Special Edition Hosted by DJ Drama)

Mixtape by YoungBoy Never Broke Again
- Released: October 21, 2022
- Length: 46:36
- Labels: Never Broke Again; Atlantic
- Producers: 17OnDaTrack; 6lement; Aldaz; Bans; BeatsAintFree JG; Ben10k; BJondatrakk; Callari; Cheese; Census; Chief Keef; Cv; Danes Blood; Dmac; Don; DP Beats; D-Roc; Drum Dummie; Dunk Rock; Dylan Kidd; ForeignGotEm; G06 Beatz; Haisofn; Harto Beats; Haze; Hurtboy AG; Jay Lv; Josh Coleman; Khris James; Kyd; Marko Lenz; Mason Wu; Noah Mejia; Powers Pleasant; Prodalek; Smatt Sertified; Southside; Str8cash; TnTXD; YoungerNextLife; Yung Lan; Yung Tago; Zuus
- Compiler: DJ Drama

YoungBoy Never Broke Again chronology
3800 Degrees (2022)	Ma' I Got a Family (A Gangsta Grillz Special Edition Hosted by DJ Drama) (2022)	3860 (2022)

Ma' I Got a Family, also referred to by its full title Ma' I Got a Family, A Gangsta Grillz Special Edition Hosted by DJ Drama on streaming services, is the nineteenth solo mixtape by American rapper YoungBoy Never Broke Again, released through Never Broke Again and Atlantic Records on October 21, 2022, a day after his 23rd birthday. The mixtape is hosted by DJ Drama as an installment of his Gangsta Grillz mixtape series. It features guest appearances from rappers Nicki Minaj and Yeat, while the production was handled by 808 Mafia, Chief Keef, Dmac, D-Roc, Drum Dummie, Mason Wu, Noah Mejia, TnTXD, Khris James, and Cheese, the latter two also mixed, mastered, and recorded the entire project. The mixtape marks YoungBoy's sixth release of 2022 (fifth solo).

== Background ==
Over a week and a half after YoungBoy's early October Juvenile-influenced 3800 Degrees, through the community tab on YoungBoy's official YouTube channel, YoungBoy announced the release of the mixtape. The announcement was later followed by a teaser where YoungBoy hinted that he plans to release ten projects by the end of 2022. Just a day prior to the mixtape's release, on October 20, 2022, YoungBoy's twenty-third birthday, the mixtape's release was officially announced by Birdman through his Instagram, similar to the announcement of 3800 Degrees. Hours later, through the Never Broke Again Instagram page, the mixtape's tracklist was unveiled, revealing two features Nicki Minaj and Yeat.

== Artwork ==
The mixtape's artwork pictures YoungBoy Never Broke Again and his wife, Jazlyn MyChelle. With YoungBoy and Jaz are the couple's two children. In the background of the artwork, photos of YoungBoy and his other children can be seen alongside YoungBoy's 100 RIAA certification plaque.

== Critical reception ==
Professional ratings
Review scores
Source	Rating
AllMusic	3/5 stars

Paul Simpson from AllMusic stated that Ma’ I Got A Family "Far less hard-edged and aggressive than one might expect." He noted that "the mixtape taps into YoungBoy's sentimental side," and that "this is not the release one would expect DJ Drama to be involved with."

== Commercial performance ==
Ma' I Got a Family debuted at number seven on the US Billboard 200 chart, earning 37,000 album-equivalent units (including 402 copies in pure album sales) in its first week. The album also accumulated a total of 52.54 million on-demand streams of the album's songs, and marked YoungBoy's fifth top-ten entry of 2022. Furthermore, YoungBoy broke the tie with Jay-Z for the artist with the fifth most charting Billboard 200 albums in history.

== Track listing ==
Ma' I Got a Family track listing
No.	Title	Writer(s)	Producer(s)	Length
1.	"Pop Out"	Kentrell Gaulden; Joshua Howard Luellen; Matthew-Kyle Brown; Aaron Raj Tanarasoo	Southside; Smatt Sertified; Cloud^{[a]}; Dover7^{[a]}	2:39
2.	"Rain"	Gaulden; Jason Goldberg; Jordan Oliver Edon; Tevin Revell; Mark Nikolaev; Will Boyette	Cheese; Tfisdon; Drum Dummie; Marko Lenz	2:25
3.	"Sedated"	Gaulden; Goldberg; Leonardo Mateus; Aaron Tago	Cheese; Bans; Yung Tago	2:08
4.	"Get Right"	Gaulden; Goldberg; Daniel Yenuen Aldaz Leander; Angelo Callari; Isak Gidgård	Cheese; Aldaz; Callari; Str8cash	1:50
5.	"Right Now"	Gaulden; Goldberg; David McDowell; Dylan McGinnis Kidd; Mason Wu; Thomas Horton	Cheese; Dmac; Dylan Kidd^{[a]}; Mason Wu; TnTXD	3:32
6.	"McQueen"	Gaulden; Samuel Thanni; Benjamin MacGregor Wilson; Dane McQuillan; Powers Pleasant	Khris James; Ben10K; Danes Blood^{[a]}; Powers Pleasant	2:18
7.	"Ben Lomond Mountain"	Gaulden; Goldberg; Wilson; McQuillan; Jonathan Gabor; Aaron Gilfenbain	Cheese; Ben10K; Danes Blood^{[a]}; BeatsAintFree JG; Hurtboy AG	2:53
8.	"Kentrell Talk"	Gaulden	YoungBoy Never Broke Again	1:02
9.	"Sport Mode"	Gaulden; Thanni; Ethan Hayes; Junior Sinchi; Brian Mitchell	Khris James; Haze^{[a]}; Jay Lv; Zuus^{[a]}	2:06
10.	"Pay Me"	Gaulden; Goldberg; Keshawn Lawson; Ryan Hartlove; Ansel Montgomery; Michael Collins Price	Cheese; Harto Beats; YoungerNextLife	2:42
11.	"All the Problems"	Gaulden; Keith Farrelle Cozart; Donald Paschall Jr.	Chief Keef; DP Beats	2:14
12.	"Chose"	Gaulden; Thanni; Daniel Lebrun; Josh Coleman; Alek	Khris James; D-Roc; Josh Coleman; Prodalek	2:32
13.	"Rose Gold"	Gaulden; Goldberg; Lucas DiFabbio; Callari	Cheese; Dunk Rock; Callari	2:07
14.	"I Admit" (featuring Nicki Minaj)	Gaulden; Onika Tanya Maraj-Petty; Thanni; Milan Sunil Modi	Khris James; Yung Lan	3:27
15.	"Change on Me"	Gaulden; Goldberg; Lebrun; BJondatrakk; Haisofn; Park Min Geon	Cheese; D-Roc; BJondatrakk; Haisofn; G06 Beatz^{[a]}	3:00
16.	"King of the Jungle"	Gaulden; Goldberg; Lebrun; Cooper Vengrove; Sven Rafael Steenbergen	Cheese; D-Roc; Cv; 17OnDaTrack	3:00
17.	"I Don't Text Back" (featuring Yeat)	Gaulden; Noah Olivier Smith; Goldberg; Mateus; Wu; Noah Mejia	Cheese; Bans; Mason Wu; Noah Mejia	2:12
18.	"Act a Fool"	Gaulden; Goldberg; Antwan Newrik; Phil Garner; Richard Parker Wiggins	Cheese; 6lement; Park3r	2:12
19.	"Kick It"	Gaulden; Michael Romito; Vid Vucenovic; 1MercyBeatz	Census^{[a]}; ForeignGotEm; Aaron Larit^{[a]}	2:06
Total length:				46:36

Notes

- ^{^[a]} signifies an uncredited co-producer

== Personnel ==
Credits adapted from Tidal.

- Jason "Cheese" Goldberg – mastering, mixing, recording (1–19)
- Aubry "Big Juice" Delaine – recording (14)

== Charts ==
Chart performance for Ma' I Got a Family
Chart (2022)	Peak position
US Billboard 200	7
US Top R&B/Hip-Hop Albums (Billboard)	3
