= I Rest My Case =

Studio album by YoungBoy Never Broke Again
- Released: January 6, 2023
- Recorded: 2022
- Genres: Hip-hop; rage; trap
- Length: 39:50
- Labels: Never Broke Again; Motown
- Producers: 1saused; Alec; AskMe; Ayo E Go Krazy; Bj Beatz; Chase Vibez; Dat Boi Getro; DeCastro; Dissan; Dmac; Drok; Figurez; Flowrency; Font; India Got Them Beats; Ism; Jai Beats; Jasiah; Jeff Beats; Kid Krazy; King Fisher; Powers Pleasant; Scalez; Sinaki Beats; Splitmind; Star 9; Swiger Music; TayTayMadeIt; Timmydahitman; TnTXD; Train; Trebble; Trentonxkyle; Trvll; Vintage Rippah

YoungBoy Never Broke Again chronology
Lost Files (2022)	I Rest My Case (2023)	Don't Try This at Home (2023)

I Rest My Case is the fifth studio album by American rapper YoungBoy Never Broke Again. It was released on January 6, 2023, by Never Broke Again and Motown. It features production from YoungBoy's in-house engineer, Jason "Cheese" Goldberg, alongside Tay Tay, D-Roc, Swiger Music, DJ Trebble, Khris James, DeCastro, Vinatge Rippah, Dmac, Getro, Kid Krazy, Powers Pleasant, TnTXD, Wayv, and Yo Benji, alongside several other notable producers. It is YoungBoy's first studio project with Motown since signing with the label in October 2022 following the completion of his contract with Atlantic Records earlier that year.

== Release and promotion ==
I Rest My Case was first announced by YoungBoy Never Broke Again through his official Instagram page in December 2022, where he stated that an album would be released in January. Despite the album initially being titled Black, through YoungBoy's Amp radio show, he stated that the album's name would be changed to I Rest My Case. Weeks later, YoungBoy's label Never Broke Again revealed the album's initial cover art, however, it received backlash from supporters. Days later, a new cover art was announced.

Following the release of the album, YoungBoy would appear on the cover of Billboard's Power 100 magazine in which he stated that this change in appearance was due to him wanting to change.

== Critical reception ==
Professional ratings
Review scores
Source	Rating
AllMusic	3/5 stars
Clash	7/10
HipHopDX	3.4/5 stars

I Rest My Case received generally favorable reviews from music critics. Paul Simpson from AllMusic noted that YoungBoy "appears to be his attempt to hop on the trend known as rage." He concluded his review as he stated wrote that he's "not entirely as unhinged as one might expect from a YoungBoy rage album, it's still a step in a new direction for him." Robin Murray from Clash stated that "YoungBoy Never Broke Again is an unrelenting force in Stateside trap music." Continuing his review, Murray noted that "dealing with fatherhood and responsibility, it pushes his almost punk-like energy in a different direction." Concluding his review, Murray wrote, "An album of subtle progress, 'I Rest My Case' could prove to be his definitive work."

Writing for HipHopDX, Nadine Smith writes that "he's developed a dependable sound, not quite country rap, but aching with a bluesy soulfulness and frequently accompanied by classical guitar," this was followed up by her stating that "it's a style he does well, but his voice encompasses a wider spectrum of timbres and emotions." Concluding the review, Nadine notes that "within those 19 tracks, there's a more experimental EP, but because of the expectations YoungBoy has established for himself, it feels padded out to album-length with what could easily be leftover scraps from past sessions," finishing off by writing, "YoungBoy's voice makes a compelling argument for itself, but tightening the focus might help strengthen his case as an artist."

Jason Lipshutz from Billboard stated that, "YoungBoy generally gets more discerning and ferocious with every new project, and I Rest My Case is one of his strongest full-lengths to date."

== Commercial performance ==
I Rest My Case debuted at number nine on the US Billboard 200 chart, earning 29,000 album-equivalent units (including 1,000 copies in pure album sales) in its first week. The album also accumulated a total of 39.59 million on-demand streams of the album's songs.

== Track listing ==
I Rest My Case track listing
No.	Title	Writer(s)	Producer(s)	Length
1.	"Top Girls"	Kentrell Gaulden		0:30
2.	"Black"	Gaulden; Malachi-Phree Jasiah Pate; Powers Pleasant	Jasiah; Kid Krazy; Powers Pleasant	2:08
3.	"Louie V"	Gaulden	Ayo E Go Krazy; Ism; Star 9; Trvll	1:34
4.	"Swag on Point"	Gaulden; Anton Simon Kunstmann; Noah William Davis	AskMe; Trebble	2:28
5.	"Bitch Yeah"	Gaulden; Timothy Link	Timmydahitman	2:48
6.	"Red"	Gaulden; Tavian Dawson Carter; Eliot Guillory	TayTayMadeIt; Vintage Rippah	2:14
7.	"Double Cup"	Gaulden	Alec; Jeff Beats; Sinaki Beats; Train	2:22
8.	"Fight with My Sheets"	Gaulden; Chase Wegley; India Arie Williams; Aidan Crotinger	Chase Vibez; India Got Them Beats; Splitmind	2:45
9.	"Rage"	Gaulden; Carter	TayTayMadeIt	2:11
10.	"Top Haters"	Gaulden		0:24
11.	"Just Like Me"	Gaulden; Peter Gogola; David McDowell; Thomas Horton	Dat Boi Getro; Dmac; TnTXD	2:47
12.	"Ride Me"	Gaulden	Scalez	1:52
13.	"Not My Friend"	Gaulden; Trenton Kyle	TrentonxKyle	3:00
14.	"Mini Me"	Gaulden; Daniel Leburn; Daniil Bukharin; Gabriel DeCastro; Joseph Nguyen	Dissan; Drok; Font; King Fisher	1:56
15.	"Clear"	Gaulden; Russell Brandon Jamal; Zherdev Artem Evgenievich	Bj Beatz; Flowrency	2:30
16.	"I Love YB (skit)"	Gaulden		0:19
17.	"Groovy"	Gaulden; McDowell; Horton; Jaidyn Hullum	Dmac; Jai Beats; TnTXD	3:10
18.	"Same Thang"	Gaulden; Robert Joseph Swiger	Swiger Music	2:42
19.	"Hey Pops"	Gaulden; Varlet; Alejandro Font Belles; Ryan Nerby	1saused; DeCastro; Drok; Figurez	2:06
Total length:				39:50

== Personnel ==
Credits adapted from Tidal.

- YoungBoy Never Broke Again – vocals
- Jason "Cheese" Goldberg – mastering, mixing
- Khris "XO" James – engineering

== Charts ==
Chart performance for I Rest My Case
Chart (2023)	Peak position
US Billboard 200	9
US Top R&B/Hip-Hop Albums (Billboard)	5
