= 38 Baby 2 =

Mixtape by YoungBoy Never Broke Again
- Released: April 24, 2020
- Genre: Hip hop
- Length: 46:19
- Label: Never Broke Again; Atlantic
- Producer: AdamSlides; BJ Beatz; Ceddy Bo; David Tell Em; DJ Swift; Dubba-AA; EVRGRN; Felipe Spain; Gid; Hagan; India Got Them Beats; Its2Ezzy; Jakik; James Maddocks; Karltin Bankz; LC Beats; Lil Kdubb; London Blue; Mook On The Beats; Noah Mejia; Rio Leyva; Roark Bailey; Samuel Velasco; Tahj Money; Take a Daytrip; TnTXD; Tre Gilliam; Vadebeatz; Yung Lan

YoungBoy Never Broke Again chronology
Still Flexin, Still Steppin (2020)	38 Baby 2 (2020)	Top (2020)

38 Baby 2 is the fourteenth solo mixtape by American rapper YoungBoy Never Broke Again. It was released on April 24, 2020, by Never Broke Again and Atlantic Records. It features YoungBoy's mother Sherhonda Gaulden and American rapper DaBaby.

The mixtape debuted at number one on the US Billboard 200 chart, earning 67,000 album-equivalent units in its first week.

== Critical reception ==
Professional ratings
Review scores
Source	Rating
AllMusic	3.5/5 stars
HipHopDX	2.8/5 stars
Pitchfork	7.0/10

38 Baby 2 received generally favorable reviews from contemporary music critics. Kenan Draughorne from HipHopDX stated that "[YoungBoy Never Broke Again] brings all this pain and so much more to 38 Baby 2, but to middling effect." He continues by noting "Raw emotion leaps forth on just about every song," and "YoungBoy sounds tormented from the jump, and it’s apparent in each melody, inflection, and lyric on the album." The review was concluded as Draughorne stated, "He’s still churning out new music at a ferocious pace." Alphonse Pierre from Pitchfork began his review by stating that "[YoungBoy] follows in the footsteps of Louisiana legends like Boosie and Kevin Gates," as he "makes autobiographical rap that touches on pain, paranoia, and trauma." He notes that "the 20-year-old sings and raps in a choked voice that sounds like he wants to cry, but doesn’t know how," and that "Typically he’s hostile and unpredictable; it’s made his relationships the source of endless social media debate and it’s reflected in his purest love songs." Pierre concludes his review as he states "And now he’s not just another rapper who sings about pain, but the rapper who sings about pain."

== Commercial performance ==
38 Baby 2 debuted at number one on the US Billboard 200 chart, earning 67,000 album-equivalent units (including 4,000 pure album sales) in its first week, according to Nielsen Music/MRC Data. This became Youngboy's second US number one debut and his fourth top-ten album. This mixtape also accumulated a total of 96.9 million on-demand streams of the set's songs during the tracking week.

== Track listing ==
Track listing and credits adapted from Apple Music and Tidal.

38 Baby 2 track listing
No.	Title	Writer(s)	Producer(s)	Length
1.	"Bout My Business" (featuring Sherhonda Gaulden)	Kentrell Gaulden; Sherhonda Gaulden; David Boonpetch	Vadebeatz	3:07
2.	"Diamonds"	K. Gaulden; Damion Williams; Brandon Russell; Brayon Nelson	DJ Swift; BJ Beatz; Mook On The Beats	3:04
3.	"Shadows"	K. Gaulden; Tahj Vaughn; Frank Gilliam; Thomas Horton	Tahj Money; Tre Gilliam; TnTXD	3:14
4.	"Win Your Love"	K. Gaulden; India Williams; Jake Wogan	India Got Them Beats; Jakik	3:04
5.	"Ain't Easy"	K. Gaulden; Hagan Lange; Luke Clay; Horton	Hagan; LC Beats; TnTXD	2:25
6.	"Rough Ryder"	K. Gaulden; Adam Foster; Russell	AdamSlides; BJ Beatz	2:41
7.	"I-10 Baby"	K. Gaulden; Aaron Lockhart; David Dulcio; Cedric Brown	Dubba-AA; David Tell Em; Ceddy Bo	2:41
8.	"Nawfside"	K. Gaulden; I. Williams; Noah Mejia; Rio Leyva	India Got Them Beats; Mejia; Leyva	2:34
9.	"Fire Stars"	K. Gaulden; Boonpetch; Felipe Espana	Vadebeatz; Felipe Spain	2:13
10.	"Treat You Better"	K. Gaulden; Boonpetch	Vadebeatz	2:29
11.	"I Choose You"	K. Gaulden; Milan Modi; Gideon Beck; James Maddocks; Amman Nurani	Yung Lan; Gid; Maddocks; EVRGRN	2:27
12.	"Thug of Spades" (featuring DaBaby)	K. Gaulden; Jonathan Kirk; Kyre Trask; I. Williams	Lil Kdubb; India Got Them Beats	2:33
13.	"Pick from Pain"	K. Gaulden; Kendall Bailey; Denzel Baptiste; David Biral	Roark Bailey; Take a Daytrip	2:02
14.	"Top Files"	K. Gaulden; Boonpetch; Samuel Velasco	Vadebeatz; Velasco	2:39
15.	"AI Nash"	K. Gaulden; John-Francis Mbata; Russell	Its2Ezzy; BJ Beatz	3:31
16.	"Ten Talk"	K. Gaulden; Russell	BJ Beatz	2:52
17.	"On the Rest"	K. Gaulden; Horton; Sterling Reynolds; Lukas Payne	TnTXD; Karltin Bankz; London Blue	2:35
Total length:				46:19

== Charts ==
=== Weekly charts ===
Chart performance for 38 Baby 2
Chart (2020)	Peak position
Canadian Albums (Billboard)	24
US Billboard 200	1
US Top R&B/Hip-Hop Albums (Billboard)	1

=== Year-end charts ===
2020 year-end chart performance for 38 Baby 2
Chart (2020)	Position
US Billboard 200	171
US Top R&B/Hip-Hop Albums (Billboard)	73

== Certifications ==
Region	Certification	Certified units/sales
United States (RIAA)	Gold	500,000^{‡}
^{‡} Sales+streaming figures based on certification alone.
