= Still Flexin, Still Steppin =

Mixtape by YoungBoy Never Broke Again
- Released: February 21, 2020
- Genre: Hip hop
- Length: 37:55
- Label: Never Broke Again; Atlantic
- Producer: AKel; BJ Beatz; Ceddy Bo; David Tell Em; DJ Trebble; DrellOnTheTrack; Dubba-AA; Felipe S; Hagan; HitmanAudio; India Got Them Beats; Khris James; Lilkdubb; NeilOnDaTrack; Sean Angus Watson; TayTayMadeIt; Vadebeatz; Yung Lan

YoungBoy Never Broke Again chronology
AI YoungBoy 2 (2019)	Still Flexin, Still Steppin (2020)	38 Baby 2 (2020)

Still Flexin, Still Steppin is the thirteenth solo mixtape by American rapper YoungBoy Never Broke Again. It was released on February 21, 2020, by Never Broke Again and Atlantic Records. It features a lone collaboration with the rapper Quando Rondo on the track "Suited Panamera". YoungBoy Never Broke Again also released a music video for the song "Lil Top".

The mixtape debuted at number two on the US Billboard 200 with 91,000 album-equivalent units in its first week, becoming YoungBoy Never Broke Again's second-highest charting album after his 2019 number-one album AI YoungBoy 2. The mixtape was certified gold by the Recording Industry Association of America (RIAA) in October 2020.

Professional ratings
Review scores
Source	Rating
AllMusic	3/5 stars

== Background ==
The mixtape includes the previously released tracks "Bad Bad", "Knocked Off" and "Fine by Time".

== Commercial performance ==
Still Flexin, Still Steppin debuted at number two on the US Billboard 200 with 91,000 album-equivalent units in its first week, most of which came from streams, making it the most streamed album of the week. In its second week, the album dropped to number ten on the chart, earning an additional 44,000 units. On October 20, 2020, the mixtape was certified gold by the Recording Industry Association of America (RIAA) for combined sales and album-equivalent units of over 500,000 units in the United States.

== Track listing ==
Still Flexin, Still Steppin track listing
No.	Title	Writer(s)	Producer(s)	Length
1.	"RIP Lil Phat"	Kentrell Gaulden; Kyre Task; Noah Davis	Treble on the Beat; Lil Kdubb	2:26
2.	"Knocked Off"	Gaulden; Tavian Dawson Carter	TAYTAYMADEIT	2:07
3.	"Lil Top"	Gaulden; Samuel Thanni; Hagan Lange; Brandon Russell	Bj Beatz; KhrisJames XO; Hagan	3:05
4.	"Red Eye"	Gaulden; Kendrell Mattox	Drell on the Track; Sean Angus Watson^{[a]}	2:36
5.	"Fine by Time"	Gaulden; Dave Boonpetch	Vadebeatz	2:55
6.	"Suited Panamera" (featuring Quando Rondo)	Gaulden; TyQuain Bowman; Thanni; Boonpetch	KhrisJames XO; Vadebeatz	2:21
7.	"How You Want It"	Gaulden; Neil Harrison	NeilOnDaTrack	2:30
8.	"Long RD"	Gaulden; Andres Felipe Espana; Milan Modi	Felipe Spain; Yung Lan	2:55
9.	"Okay"	Gaulden; Task; India Williams	Lil Kdubb; India Got Them Beats	2:49
10.	"Bat Man"	Gaulden; Aaron Lockhart; David Dulcio; Cedric Brown	Dubba-AA; David Tell 'Em; Ceddy Bo	2:58
11.	"Call Me Late"	Gaulden; India Williams	India Got Them Beats	3:33
12.	"Gunsmoke"	Gaulden; Harris	NeilOnDaTrack	2:18
13.	"Bad Bad"	Gaulden; Allen Kelly; Gregory Sanders	HitmanAudio; Akel	2:18
14.	"No Understand"	Gaulden; Trask; Boonpetch	Lil Kdubb; Vadebeatz	3:04
Total length:				37:55

=== Notes ===
- ^a signifies a co-producer

== Charts ==
=== Weekly charts ===
Chart performance for Still Flexin, Still Steppin
Chart (2020)	Peak position
Canadian Albums (Billboard)	21
UK Albums (OCC)	83
US Billboard 200	2
US Top R&B/Hip-Hop Albums (Billboard)	1

=== Year-end charts ===
2020 year-end chart performance for Still Flexin, Still Steppin
Chart (2020)	Position
US Billboard 200	113
US Top R&B/Hip-Hop Albums (Billboard)	51

== Certifications ==
Region	Certification	Certified units/sales
United States (RIAA)	Platinum	1,000,000^{‡}
^{‡} Sales+streaming figures based on certification alone.
