= Cheese (music producer) =

American record producer and songwriter

- Born: Jason Michael Goldberg; Baton Rouge
- Genres: R&B; trap; hip-hop
- Occupations: Record producer; audio engineer; songwriter
- Years active: 2016–present
- Label: Never Broke Again
- Website: www.offroadrec.com

Jason Michael Goldberg, professionally known as Cheese, is an American record producer, songwriter, and audio engineer. He was a producer on YoungBoy Never Broke Again's Sincerely, Kentrell, The Last Slimeto, and From the Bayou. He also was as an engineer on Travis Scott and Kendrick Lamar's 2018 song, "goosebumps" as well as Tyler, the Creator, Ty Dolla $ign, and YoungBoy Never Broke Again's 2021 song "WusYaName".

== Early life ==
Jason Goldberg is American. He "fell in love with music as a teenager". Goldberg had later begun to study at the Institute of Audio Research and Full Sail University; while learning, Goldberg found his way into audio recording.

== Career ==
Cheese has worked with the artist and producers YoungBoy Never Broke Again, Travis Scott, Nicki Minaj, Lil Wayne, Rich The Kid, Kendrick Lamar, Pop Smoke, Tyler, the Creator, Buddah Bless and 30 Roc.

Throughout 2016, Goldberg acted as a recording engineer on Kat Dahlia's 20s, 50s, 100s. He acted as an assistant engineer on Meghan Trainor's sophomore studio album, Thank You, Fifth Harmony's sophomore studio album, 7/27, and Nick Jonas' third studio album, Last Year Was Complicated. However, Goldberg would breakout as an engineer on September 3, 2016, after he would act as an assistant engineer for Travis Scott and Kendrick Lamar’s song "goosebumps" which peaked at number 32 on the Billboard Hot 100 and went eight times platinum by the Recording Industry Association of America (RIAA).

Following this, Goldberg would engineer and produce tracks for rappers such as Rich The Kid, YoungBoy Never Broke Again, Pop Smoke, and many more. In 2020, through Rich The Kid, Goldberg met YoungBoy Never Broke Again and acted as a producer on "Kacey Talk" and "Callin'", both of which appeared on YoungBoy's second studio album, Top. This would encourage a new relationship between the two artists, leading to Goldberg earning over twenty plaques producing for YoungBoy, with the most notable plaque he has received being for his production on YoungBoy's "Kacey Talk" which was certified 2× platinum.

In 2021, following YoungBoy being arrested and in jail during the rollout of his third album, Sincerely, Kentrell, Goldberg would be called upon by YoungBoy's management to mix and master the entirety of the album, having recorded a couple of track before YoungBoy's incarceration. After YoungBoy was released from jail a month following the album's release, Goldberg would fly out to YoungBoy's Utah home and live there, recording, mixing, and mastering all of his forthcoming projects such as From the Bayou, Colors, Better than You, Realer 2, 3800 Degrees, and Ma' I Got a Family.

== Production discography ==
=== Singles produced ===
List of singles as either producer or co-producer
| Title | Year | Peak chart positions | | | | | | | | Certifications | Album |
| Title | Year | US | US R&B/HH | US Rap | AUS | CAN | IRE | NZ | WW | Certifications | Album |
|---|---|---|---|---|---|---|---|---|---|---|---|
| "Kacey Talk" (YoungBoy Never Broke Again) | 2020 | 50 | 19 | 18 | — | — | — | — | 87 | RIAA: 2× Platinum | Top |
| "Callin'" (YoungBoy Never Broke Again featuring Snoop Dogg) | 2020 | — (Note: "Callin" did not chart on the Billboard Hot 100, but peaked at number three on the Bubbling Under Hot 100 Singles chart.) | 42 | — | — | — | — | — | — | RIAA: Gold | Top |
| "Toxic Punk" (YoungBoy Never Broke Again) | 2021 | 99 | 49 | — | — | — | — | — | — | RIAA: Gold | Sincerely, Kentrell |
| "Territorial" (YoungBoy Never Broke Again) | 2021 | — | — | — | — | — | — | — | — | | Non-album single |
| "Twin" (GoldLink featuring Rich the Kid) | 2021 | — | — | — | — | — | — | — | — | | Non-album single |
| "Lost Soul" (Rojay MLP) | 2021 | — | — | — | — | — | — | — | — | | Non-album single |
| "Life Support" (YoungBoy Never Broke Again) | 2021 | 48 | 17 | 15 | — | — | — | — | 107 | RIAA: Gold | Sincerely, Kentrell |
| "On My Side" (YoungBoy Never Broke Again) | 2021 | 37 | 12 | 10 | — | — | — | — | 75 | | Sincerely, Kentrell |
| "Unwanted Lifestyle" (NoCap) | 2021 | — | — | — | — | — | — | — | — | | Non-album single |
| "Blood Sweat Tears" (Bag Swag) | 2021 | — | — | — | — | — | — | — | — | | Non-album single |
| "Bring the Hook" (YoungBoy Never Broke Again) | 2022 | 61 | 19 | — | — | — | — | — | 14 | RIAA: Gold | Colors |
| "Hit" (YoungBoy Never Broke Again and DaBaby) | 2022 | — (Note: "Hit" did not chart on the Billboard Hot 100, but peaked at number 25 on the Bubbling Under Hot 100 chart.) | — | — | — | — | — | — | — | | Better than You |
| "Super Bowl" (YoungBoy Never Broke Again) | 2022 | — | — | — | — | — | — | — | — | | Non-album single |
| "I Hate YoungBoy" (YoungBoy Never Broke Again) | 2022 | 79 | 26 | 19 | — | — | — | — | — | RIAA: Gold | The Last Slimeto |
| "Neighborhood Superstar" (YoungBoy Never Broke Again and DaBaby) | 2022 | 89 | 31 | — | — | — | — (Note: "Neighborhood Superstar" did not enter the NZ Top 40 Singles Chart, but peaked at number 33 on the NZ Hot Singles Chart.) | — | — | | Better than You |
| "Don't Rate Me" (YoungBoy Never Broke Again featuring Quavo) | 2022 | — | — | — | — | — | — | — | — | | The Last Slimeto |
| "Proud of Myself" (YoungBoy Never Broke Again) | 2022 | — | — | — | — | — | — | — | — | | Non-album single |
| "Goals" (YoungBoy Never Broke Again) | 2022 | — | — | — | — | — | — | — | — | | Non-album single |
| "Vette Motors" (YoungBoy Never Broke Again) | 2022 | 62 | 19 | 17 | — | — | — | — | — | RIAA: Gold | The Last Slimeto |
| "Late to da Party" (Lil Nas X and YoungBoy Never Broke Again) | 2022 | 67 | 19 | 15 | 54 | 42 | 83 | — (Note: "Late to da Party" did not enter the NZ Top 40 Singles Chart, but peaked at number six on the NZ Hot Singles Chart.) | 77 | | Non-album single |
| "Keep Me Dry" (YoungBoy Never Broke Again and Quando Rondo) | 2022 | — | — | — | — | — | — | — | — | | 3860 |
| "Like My Ex" (Beez Kennedy) | 2023 | — | — | — | — | — | — | — | — | | Non-album single |
| "Closed Case" (YoungBoy Never Broke Again) | 2024 | — | — | — | — | — | — | — | — | | Non-album single |

=== Other charted and certified songs ===
List of songs as either producer or co-producer
| Title | Year | Peak chart positions | | | | Certifications | Album |
| Title | Year | US | US R&B/HH | US Rap | WW | Certifications | Album |
|---|---|---|---|---|---|---|---|
| "Bad Morning" | 2021 | 28 | 9 | 7 | 55 | RIAA: Gold | Sincerely, Kentrell |
| "Hold Me Down" | 2021 | 53 | 20 | 17 | 103 | | Sincerely, Kentrell |
| "Smoke Strong" | 2021 | 61 | 26 | 22 | 124 | | Sincerely, Kentrell |
| "No Where" | 2021 | 40 | 14 | 12 | 77 | RIAA: Gold | Sincerely, Kentrell |
| "Sincerely" | 2021 | 67 | 29 | 24 | 149 | | Sincerely, Kentrell |
| "I Can't Take It Back" | 2021 | 69 | 30 | 25 | 156 | | Sincerely, Kentrell |
| "Rich Shit" | 2021 | 83 | 39 | — | 184 | | Sincerely, Kentrell |
| "My Killa" | 2021 | — (Note: "My Killa" did not chart on the Billboard Hot 100, but peaked at number two on the Bubbling Under Hot 100 Singles chart.) | — | — | — | | Sincerely, Kentrell |
| "Break or Make Me" | 2021 | 62 | 27 | 23 | 151 | | Sincerely, Kentrell |
| "Panoramic" | 2021 | — (Note: "Panoramic" did not chart on the Billboard Hot 100, but peaked at number nine on the Bubbling Under Hot 100 Singles chart.) | — | — | — | | Sincerely, Kentrell |
| "Heart & Soul" (YoungBoy Never Broke Again and Birdman) | 2021 | — (Note: "Heart & Soul" did not chart on the Billboard Hot 100, but peaked at number one on the Bubbling Under Hot 100 Singles chart.) | 29 | 18 | — | RIAA: Gold | From the Bayou |
| "Black Ball" (YoungBoy Never Broke Again and Birdman) | 2021 | 93 | 31 | 20 | — | RIAA: Platinum | From the Bayou |
| "Long Live" (YoungBoy Never Broke Again | 2022 | 87 | 33 | 24 | — | | Colors |
| "No Switch" (YoungBoy Never Broke Again | 2022 | 58 | 16 | 11 | 171 | RIAA: Gold | Colors |
| "Smoke One" (YoungBoy Never Broke Again | 2022 | 97 | 40 | — | — | | Colors |
| "2Hoo" (YoungBoy Never Broke Again | 2022 | 86 | 32 | 23 | — | | Colors |
| "DC Marvel" (YoungBoy Never Broke Again | 2022 | — (Note: "DC Marvel" did not chart on the Billboard Hot 100, but peaked at number 19 on the Bubbling Under Hot 100 chart.) | — | — | — | | Colors |
| "How You Been" (YoungBoy Never Broke Again | 2022 | — (Note: "How You Been" did not chart on the Billboard Hot 100, but peaked at number 10 on the Bubbling Under Hot 100 chart.) | 50 | — | — | | Colors |
| "Expensive Taste" (YoungBoy Never Broke Again | 2022 | — (Note: "Expensive Taste" did not chart on the Billboard Hot 100, but peaked at number four on the Bubbling Under Hot 100 chart.) | 44 | — | — | | Colors |
| "Cage Feeling" (YoungBoy Never Broke Again | 2022 | — (Note: "Cage Feeling" did not chart on the Billboard Hot 100, but peaked at number 16 on the Bubbling Under Hot 100 chart.) | — | — | — | | Colors |
| "Dis & That" (YoungBoy Never Broke Again | 2022 | 89 | 35 | — | — | | Colors |
| "Gangsta" (YoungBoy Never Broke Again featuring Quando Rondo) | 2022 | — (Note: "Gangsta" did not chart on the Billboard Hot 100, but peaked at number nine on the Bubbling Under Hot 100 chart.) | 49 | — | — | | Colors |
| "Know Like I Know" (YoungBoy Never Broke Again | 2022 | 74 | 29 | 22 | — | | Colors |
| "Emo Rockstar" (YoungBoy Never Broke Again | 2022 | — (Note: "Emo Rockstar" did not chart on the Billboard Hot 100, but peaked at number 11 on the Bubbling Under Hot 100 Singles chart.) | — | — | — | | Colors |
| "I Got This" (YoungBoy Never Broke Again | 2022 | — (Note: "I Got This" did not chart on the Billboard Hot 100, but peaked at number 21 on the Bubbling Under Hot 100 chart.) | — | — | — | | Colors |
| "On This Line" (YoungBoy Never Broke Again and DaBaby) | 2022 | — (Note: "On This Line" did not enter the Billboard Hot 100, but peaked at number 15 on the Bubbling Under Hot 100 chart.) | — | — | — | | Better than You |
| "Turbo" (YoungBoy Never Broke Again and DaBaby) | 2022 | — (Note: "Turbo" did not enter the Billboard Hot 100, but peaked at number five on the Bubbling Under Hot 100 chart.) | 46 | — | — | | Better than You |
| "I Know" (YoungBoy Never Broke Again | 2022 | 46 | 13 | 11 | 195 | | The Last Slimeto |
| "My Time" (YoungBoy Never Broke Again | 2022 | 90 | 34 | — | — | | The Last Slimeto |
| "My Go To" (YoungBoy Never Broke Again featuring Kehlani) | 2022 | — (Note: "My Go To" did not chart on the Billboard Hot 100, but peaked at number one on the Bubbling Under Hot 100 Singles chart.) | 39 | — | — | | The Last Slimeto |
| "Lost Soul Survivor" (YoungBoy Never Broke Again | 2022 | 75 | 25 | 21 | — | | The Last Slimeto |
| "Kamikaze" (YoungBoy Never Broke Again | 2022 | 88 | 32 | — | — | | The Last Slimeto |
| "Swerving" (YoungBoy Never Broke Again | 2022 | — (Note: "Swerving" did not chart on the Billboard Hot 100, but peaked at number 10 on the Bubbling Under Hot 100 Singles chart.) | 50 | — | — | | The Last Slimeto |
| "Home Ain't Home" (YoungBoy Never Broke Again featuring Rod Wave) | 2022 | 47 | 14 | 12 | 181 | | The Last Slimeto |
| "7 Days" (YoungBoy Never Broke Again | 2022 | 100 | 38 | — | — | | The Last Slimeto |
| "Digital" (YoungBoy Never Broke Again | 2022 | — (Note: "Digital" did not chart on the Billboard Hot 100, but peaked at number two on the Bubbling Under Hot 100 Singles chart.) | 41 | — | — | | The Last Slimeto |
| "Proof" (YoungBoy Never Broke Again | 2022 | — (Note: "Proof" did not chart on the Billboard Hot 100, but peaked at number eight on the Bubbling Under Hot 100 Singles chart.) | 48 | — | — | | The Last Slimeto |
| "4KT Baby" (YoungBoy Never Broke Again | 2022 | 96 | 30 | 24 | — | | The Last Slimeto |
| "The North Bleeding" (YoungBoy Never Broke Again | 2022 | — (Note: "The North Bleeding" did not chart on the Billboard Hot 100, but peaked at number seven on the Bubbling Under Hot 100 Singles chart.) | 46 | — | — | | The Last Slimeto |
| "Loner Life" (YoungBoy Never Broke Again | 2022 | — (Note: "Loner Life" did not chart on the Billboard Hot 100, but peaked at number two on the Bubbling Under Hot 100 Singles chart.) | 37 | — | — | | The Last Slimeto |
| "Acclaimed Emotions" (YoungBoy Never Broke Again | 2022 | — (Note: "Acclaimed Emotions" did not chart on the Billboard Hot 100, but peaked at number 10 on the Bubbling Under Hot 100 Singles chart.) | 49 | — | — | | The Last Slimeto |
| "Wagwan" (YoungBoy Never Broke Again | 2022 | — (Note: "Wagwan" did not chart on the Billboard Hot 100, but peaked at number four on the Bubbling Under Hot 100 Singles chart.) | 41 | — | — | | The Last Slimeto |
| "Holy" (YoungBoy Never Broke Again | 2022 | — (Note: "Holy" did not chart on the Billboard Hot 100, but peaked at number 25 on the Bubbling Under Hot 100 Singles chart.) | — | — | — | | The Last Slimeto |
| "I Got the Bag" (YoungBoy Never Broke Again | 2022 | — (Note: "I Got the Bag" did not chart on the Billboard Hot 100, but peaked at number 19 on the Bubbling Under Hot 100 Singles chart.) | — | — | — | | The Last Slimeto |
| "Put It on Me" (YoungBoy Never Broke Again | 2022 | 63 | 16 | 11 | — | | Realer 2 |
| "Dangerous Love" (YoungBoy Never Broke Again | 2022 | — (Note: "Dangerous Love" did not chart on the Billboard Hot 100, but peaked at number 21 on the Bubbling Under Hot 100 Singles chart.) | 46 | — | — | | Realer 2 |
| "Purge Me" (YoungBoy Never Broke Again | 2022 | 95 | 30 | 23 | — | | Realer 2 |
| "Big Truck" (YoungBoy Never Broke Again | 2023 | 100 | 28 | 18 | — | | Don't Try This at Home |
| "What You Say" (YoungBoy Never Broke Again featuring the Kid Laroi and Post Malone) | 2023 | — | 47 | — | — | | Don't Try This at Home |
| "I Heard" (YoungBoy Never Broke Again | 2023 | 98 | 31 | 21 | — | | Richest Opp |
| "Just Flow" (YoungBoy Never Broke Again | 2023 | — | 50 | — | — | | Richest Opp |
| "Free Meechy" (YoungBoy Never Broke Again | 2023 | — | 43 | — | — | | Richest Opp |
| "Better Than Ever" (YoungBoy Never Broke Again and Rod Wave | 2023 | 99 | 25 | — | — | | Decided 2 |
"—" denotes a recording that did not chart or was not released in that territory.

== Engineering credits ==
| Year | Artist | Album | Song(s) | Credit | Record label | Ref. |
|---|---|---|---|---|---|---|
| 2016 | Kat Dahlia | 20s, 50s, 100s | 02. "Voices in My Head"; 03. "Lion" | Recording Engineer | Self-released | |
| 2016 | Meghan Trainor | Thank You | 05. "Hopeless Romantic"; 08. "Woman Up"; 09. "Just a Friend to You" | Assistant Engineer | Epic Records | |
| 2016 | Fifth Harmony | 7/27 | 06. "All in My Head (Flex)" (featuring Fetty Wap); 07. "Squeeze"; 09. "Scared of Happy"; 10. "Not That Kinda Girl" (featuring Missy Elliott); 10. "Big Bad Wolf" | Assistant Engineer | Epic, Syco Music | |
| 2016 | Nick Jonas | Last Year Was Complicated | 12. "Comfortable" | Assistant Mixing Engineer | Island Records, Safehouse Records | |
| 2016 | Travis Scott | Birds in the Trap Sing McKnight | 09. "goosebumps" (featuring Kendrick Lamar) | Assistant Engineer | Epic, Grand Hustle Records | |
| 2019 | Rich the Kid | BOSS MAN | 01. "Far from You" (recorded only); 02. "Stuck Together" (featuring Future & Lil Baby) (mixed only); 03. "Ray Charles" (mixed only); 04. "Sick" (featuring DaBaby) (mixed only); 05. "Not Sorry" (featuring Nicki Minaj) (mixed only); 06. "Red" (mixed only); 07. "V12" (featuring Post Malone) (mixed only); 08. "For That" (mixed only); 09. "Depend on Me" (featuring Lil Tjay); 10. "Easy" (mixed only); 11. "About My Business" (mixed only); 12. "No Loyalty"; 13. "Ain't No Doubts" (mixed only); 14. "You" (mixed only); 15. "Racks On" (featuring YoungBoy Never Broke Again) (mixed only); 16. "I Want Mo" (with London on da Track) (mixed only); 17. "Over With"; 18. "That's Tuff" (featuring Quavo) (mixed only); 19. "Money Talk" (featuring YoungBoy Never Broke Again) (mixed only) | Mixing Engineer, Recording | Republic Records | |
| 2020 | YoungBoy Never Broke Again | Still Flexin, Still Steppin | 04. "Red Eye" | Recording | Never Broke Again, Atlantic Records | |
| 2020 | Pop Smoke | Shoot for the Stars, Aim for the Moon | 04. "The Woo" (featuring 50 Cent & Roddy Ricch) | Engineer | Republic, Victor Victor | |
| 2020 | KYLE | See You When I Am Famous!!!!!!!!!!!! | 04. "YES!" (featuring Rich the Kid & K Camp) | Recording | Atlantic Records | |
| 2020 | Sheff G | Just 4 Yall | 02. "YES!" (with Rich the Kid); 02. "YES!" (with Lil Tjay) | Recording | EMPIRE, Winners Circle | |
| 2020 | YoungBoy Never Broke Again | Top | 06. "Kacey Talk"; 07. "My Window" (featuring Lil Wayne); 10. "All In"; 12. "Fuck Ya!"; 14. "Boom"; 15. "Reaper's Child"; 21. "Callin" (featuring Snoop Dogg) | Mixing | Never Broke Again, Atlantic Records | |
| 2020 | YoungBoy Never Broke Again | Until I Return | 10. "Thrasher"; 12. "3 am "3 am14. "Doomed" | Mastering Engineer, Mixing | Never Broke Again, Atlantic Records | |
| 2021 | YoungBoy Never Broke Again | Sincerely, Kentrell | 01. "Bad Morning"; 02. "Hold Me Down"; 03. "On My Side"; 04. "Smoke Strong"; 05. "50 Shots"; 06. "No WNowhere 07. "Sincerely"; 08. "I Can't Take It Back"; 09. "Rich Shit"; 10. "Toxic Punk"; 11. "My Killa"; 12. "Life Support"; 13. "Break or Make Me"; 14. "Forgiato"; 15. "Baddest Thing"; 16. "Nevada"; 17. "Level I Want to Reach"; 18. "Kickstand"; 19. "All I Need"; 20. "White Teeth"; 21. "Panoramic"; 22. "Footstep (Bonus)"; 23. "Still Waiting (Bonus)" | Mastering, Mixing | Never Broke Again, Atlantic | |
| 2021 | Lil Wayne & Rich the Kid | Trust Fund Babies | 01. "Feelin' Like Tunechi"; 02. "Headlock"; 03. "Trust Fund"; 04. "Admit It"; 05. "Shh"; 06. "Big Boss"; 07. "Still"; 08. "Bleedin\"; 09. "Buzzin'" (with YG); 10. "Yeah Yeah" | Recording | Republic, Young Money, Rostrum Records | |
| 2021 | YoungBoy Never Broke Again & Birdman | From the Bayou | 01. "100 Rounds"; 02. "We Ride"; 03. "Choppa Boy"; 04. "Open Arms"; 05. "Alligator Walk"; 06. "The Bigger End"; 07. "Young Stunna"; 08. "Safe thenthanry"; 09. "Heart & Soul"; 10. "How Ya Kno"; 11. "Achievements"; 12. "Black Ball"; 13. "Stuck with Me" | Mastering, Mixing, Recording | Never Broke Again, Atlantic, Interscope Records, Universal Motown Records, Cash Money Records | |
| 2022 | YoungBoy Never Broke Again | Colors | 01. "Long Live"; 02. "Bring It On"; 03. "No Switch"; 04. "Smoke One"; 05. "2Hoo"; 06. "DC Marvel"; 07. "How You Been"; 08. "Expensive Taste"; 09. "Cage Feeling"; 10. "Dis & That"; 11. "Gangsta"; 12. "Know Like I Know"; 13. "Bring the Hook"; 14. "Fish Scale"; 15. "Emo Rockstar"; 16. "Emo Love"; 17. "Snow Bunny"; 18. "Foolish Figure"; 19. "I Got This"; 20. "Flossin'" | Mastering, Mixing, Recording | Never Broke Again, Atlantic | |
| 2022 | YoungBoy Never Broke Again & DaBaby | BETTER THAN YOU | 01. "Hit"; 02. "On this Line"; 03. "Little to a Lot"; 04. "WiFi"; 05. "Turbo"; 06. "BBL"; 07. "Count on Me"; 08. "Syracuse"; 09. "Creeper"; 10. "Head Off" (recorded with Alejandro Rodriguez-Dawsøn); 11. "Neighborhood Superstar"; 12. "Bestie" (recorded with Alejandro Rodriguez-Dawsøn) | Mastering, Mixing, Recording | Never Broke Again, Atlantic, Interscope, SCMG | |
| 2022 | NoCap | Mr. Crawford | 01. "Mr. Crawford"; 02. "FTW" (mixed only); 03. "Vaccine"; 04. "Vaccine (Falling Star)"; 05. "Very Special" (mixed only); 15. "Untouchable"; 19. "Grenade"; 20. "Flags To The Sky" (featuring YoungBoy Never Broke Again) | Mastering, Mixing | Never Broke Again, Atlantic | |
| 2022 | YoungBoy Never Broke Again | The Last Slimeto | 01. "I Know"; 02. "Hold Your Own" (recorded by Khris James); 03. "Umm Hmm" (recorded by Khris James); 04. "Top Sound" (recorded by Khris James); 05. "My Time"; 06. "Free Dem 5's" (recorded by Khris James); 07. "My Go To" (featuring Kehlani); 08. "Lost Soul Survivor"; 09. "Fuck da Industry" (recorded by Khris James); 10. "Kamikaze"; 11. "Swerving"; 12. "Stay the Same"; 13. "Home Ain't Home" (featuring Rod Wave); 14. "7 Days"; 15. "Digital" (recorded by Khris James); 16. "Vette Motors"; 17. "Slow Down" (recorded by Khris James); 18. "Don't Rate Me" (featuring Quavo); 19. "Proof"; 20. "4KT Baby"; 21. "The North Bleeding" (assisted with mixing by Schneider Seines); 22. "Loner Life" (assisted with mixing by Schneider Seines); 23. "Acclaimed Emotions" (assisted with mixing by Schneider Seines); 24. "Wagwan"; 25. "Ghost" (assisted with mixing by Schneider Seines); 26. "Nightfall"; 27. "Holy"; 28. "I Got the Bag" (recorded by Khris James); 30. "I Hate YoungBoy" | Mastering, Mixing, Recording | Never Broke Again, Atlantic | |
| 2022 | YoungBoy Never Broke Again | Realer 2 | 01. "Put It on Me"; 02. "Boot Up"; 03. "Dangerous Love"; 04. "Bloody Night"; 05. "I Don't Like It"; 06. "Tell Me"; 07. "Shotta Soul"; 08. "Fresh Prince of Utah"; 09. "Never Lie"; 10. "DentHead"; 11. "Poppin Shit" (featuring Jaz); 12. "I'm the One"; 13. "Survive"; 14. "You Knew"; 15. "Purge Me" | Mastering, Mixing, Recording | Never Broke Again, Atlantic | |
| 2022 | YoungBoy Never Broke Again | 3800 Degrees | 01. "Back on My Feet" (additional engineer); 02. "Won't Step on Me" (additional engineer); 03. "Pimpin a Bitch" (additional engineer); 04. "Handle One" (additional engineer); 05. "Choppa on My Shoulda" (additional engineer); 06. "It Could Go"; 07. "Ampd Up" (additional engineer) (featuring Mouse on tha Track); 08. "Head Busted" (additional engineer); 09. "No Alarm" (additional engineer); 10. "Hard" (additional engineer) (featuring Shy Glizzy); 11. "More Wheezy"; 12. "Thug Nigga Story" (additional engineer) (featuring E-40); 13. "With Us" | Mastering, Mixing, Recording, Additional Engineer | Never Broke Again, Atlantic | |
| 2022 | YoungBoy Never Broke Again | Ma' I Got a Family | 01. "Pop Out"; 02. "Rain"; 03. "Sedated"; 04. "Get Right"; 05. "Right Now"; 06. "McQueen"; 07. "Ben Lomond Mountain"; 08. "Kentrell Talk"; 09. "Sport Mode"; 10. "Pay Me"; 11. "All The Problems"; 12. "Chose"; 13. "Rose Gold"; 14. "I Admit" (featuring Nicki Minaj) (recorded with Aubry "Big Juice" Delaine); 15. "Change On Me"; 16. "King Of The Jungle"; 17. "I Don't Text Back" (featuring Yeat); 18. "Act A Fool"; 19. "Kick It" | Mastering, Mixing, Recording | Never Broke Again, Atlantic | |
| 2022 | Never Broke Again | Never Broke Again: Nightmare on 38th St | 07. "With Me" (with YoungBoy Never Broke Again) | Mixing, Recording | Never Broke Again, Motown, UMG | |
| 2022 | YoungBoy Never Broke Again & Quando Rondo | 3860 | 01. "I Swear" (featuring Lil Timm) (recorded with CxbGoCrazy); 02. "It's On" (recorded with CxbGoCrazy); 03. "Casket Talk" (recorded with CxbGoCrazy); 04. "Give Me a Sign" (recorded with CxbGoCrazy); 05. "Want Me Dead" (recorded with CxbGoCrazy); 06. "Cream Soda" (performed by Quando Rondo) (recorded with CxbGoCrazy); 07. "No Mercy" (recorded with CxbGoCrazy); 08. "Loaded" (recorded with CxbGoCrazy); 09. "Can't Compare" (performed by Quando Rondo) (recorded with CxbGoCrazy); 10. "Trophies" (performed by Quando Rondo); 11. "Keep Me Dry" (recorded with CxbGoCrazy); 12. "Million Dollar Kid" (recorded with CxbGoCrazy); 13. "At the Top" (recorded with CxbGoCrazy); 14. "Heat Tucked" (performed by Quando Rondo)(recorded with CxbGoCrazy, mixed with Fabian Marasciullo); 15. "My Friend" (recorded by CxbGoCrazy, mixed with Fabian Marasciullo); 16. "Running Away from Home" (performed by Quando Rondo)(recorded by CxbGoCrazy) | Mastering, Mixing, Recording | Quando Rondo LLC, Never Broke Again, Atlantic | |
| 2022 | NoCap | The Main Bird | 05. "Ain’t Right" | Recording | Never Broke Again, Atlantic | |
| 2022 | Bway Yungy | Success Before Destruction | 01. "That's Tha Feeling"; 05. "Far Away" (featuring YoungBoy Never Broke Again) | Recording (with Hitmann) | Artist Partner Group, Atlantic | |
| 2023 | YoungBoy Never Broke Again | I Rest My Case | 01. "Top Girls"; 02. "Black"; 03. "Louie V"; 04. "Swag On Point"; 05. "Bitch Yeah"; 06. "Red"; 07. "Double Cup"; 08. "Fight With My Sheets"; 09. "Rage"; 10. "Top Haters"; 11. "Just Like Me"; 12. "Ride Me"; 13. "Not My Friend"; 14. "Mini Me"; 15. "Clear"; 16. "I Love YB skit"; 17. "Groovy"; 18. "Same Thang"; 19. "Hey Pops" | Mastering, Mixing | Never Broke Again, Motown, UMG | |
| 2023 | Summrs | Stuck In My Ways | 1. "Relying On Roxy" (mastered only); 2. "Start Striking" (mastered only); 3. "No Days Off" (mastered only); 4. "Life's A Beautiful Curse"; 5. "Pure Motion"; 6. "No Morals" (mastered only); 7. "Russian Roulette"; 8. "Die Rich" (mastered and mixed only); 9. "Van Cleef" Poppin; 10. "Addy Geek" (mastered and mixed only); 11. "The Detox" (mastered and mixed only); 12. "Drug TrafTrafficking13. "Like A River"; 14. "My Voicemail" (mastered only); 15. "Closing The Book" (mastered and mixed only); 16. "Blood Tears" (Interlude); 17. "Miles On U"; 18. "Album Just For You"; 19. "IKYMMG"; 20. "Pilates"; 21. "Like My Diamonds" (mastered only); 22. "Baby Blue Gwag" (mastered and mixed only); 23. "Switch Sound" (mastered only); 24. "Praise Da Most High" (mastered only); 25. "Stuck In My Ways" (mastered and mixed only) | Mastering, Mixing, Recording | 10K Projects | |
| 2023 | Yeat | Afterlyfe | 2. "Shmunk" (with YoungBoy Never Broke Again) | Mixing, Recording | Geffen, Field Trip, Twizzy Rich | |
| 2023 | YoungBoy Never Broke Again | Don't Try This At Home | 01. "Big Truck"; 02. "Mr Gaulden"; 03. "Take Down"; 04. "By Myself"; 05. "Out Nothing"; 06. "Bangin My Line"; 07. "Rear View" (with Mariah the Scientist); 08. "Hustle"; 09. "Morning"; 10. "Homicide Pt. 2"; 11. "Cold Killers"; 12. "WTF" (with Nicki Minaj) (mastered with Chris Athens); 13. "Choppa Docter"; 14. "Trust Issues"; 15. "Run the Hood"; 16. "No Rubber"; 17. "Loaded Now"; 18. "Got One"; 19. "Spin&Ben'n"; 20. "1.5"; 21. "War"; 22. "Grave Digga"; 23. "Off the Lean"; 24. "What You Say" (featuring Post Malone and the Kid LAROI); 25. "No Lease"; 26. "Slimeto"; 27. "Another Dead"; 28. "Pistol Totting"; 29. "Cemetery Lifestyle"; 30. "Don't Leave"; 31. "Head Shot"; 32. "I Is That"; 33. "Like Madden" | Mastering, Mixing | Never Broke Again, Motown, UMG | |
| 2023 | Summrs | GHOST | 1. "Devil On My Back"; 2. "Like Woah"; 3. "Shake It"; 4. "Eye 4 Eye"; 5. "Rich N Turnt"; 6. "Real Goat"; 7. "Prayer"; 8. "No Really"; 9. "Ball 4 Ball"; 10. "Got Dat Muneh"; 11. "Free Body"; 12. "Like BK"; 13. "I'm Paid"; 14. "Nvr Losing"; 15. "God Like"; 16. "GOTY"; 17. "Meet You There"; 18. "Munchkin"; 19. "SlowFlow"; 20. "It GetGetsazy"; 21. "RIP Virgil" | Mastering, Mixing (with Summrs), Recording | 10K Projects | |
| 2023 | YoungBoy Never Broke Again | Richest Opp | 01. "Bitch Let's Do It"; 02. "I Got That Shit"; 03. "I Heard"; 04. "Hurt My Heart"; 05. "Dirty Thug"; 06. "Just Flow"; 07. "Free Meechy" (recorded by Khris James); 08. "Father"; 09. "Fuck the Industry Pt. 2"; 10. "What You Gonna Do"; 11. "Perspective"; 12. "Chopstick" (featuring NBA Ben 10); 13. "Slimes Go Where I Go"; 14. "Slider"; 15. "I Shot Qupid"; 16. "Channel 9"; 17. "I Want His Soul" | Mastering, Mixing, Recording (with YoungBoy Never Broke Again) | Never Broke Again, Motown, UMG | |
| 2023 | Never Broke Again | Green Flag Activity, Vol. 2 | 01. "I Told You" (featuring Quando Rondo, Bway Yungy and Lil Dump); 02. "Slump" (featuring YoungBoy Never Broke Again); 04. "Live On" (featuring Rojay MLP); 06. "Casket Talk, Pt. 2" (featuring Quando Rondo; 07. "I Need to Know" (featuring YoungBoy Never Broke Again) | Mastering, Mixing, Recording | Never Broke Again, Motown, UMG | |
| 2023 | Lil Tjay | 222 | 12. "Project Walls" (featuring YoungBoy Never Broke Again) | Mixing, Recording (YoungBoy Never Broke Again's verse only) | Columbia Records | |
| 2023 | Shordie Shordie & Murda Beatz | Memory Lane 2 | 01. "A Lot of Miles"; 02. "Me Too"; 03. "On You"; 04. "Ride With Shordie, Pt. 2"; 05. "Drink"; 06. "Sin City"; 07. "Contacts"; 08. "Don't Forget Me"; 09. "First Kiss" (featuring Baby B); 10. "A Nice Time"; 11. "WYO" (featuring BlakeIANA); 12. "Too Many"; 13. "Enjoy the Ride" (featuring Mozzy); 14. "Farmers Market"; 15. "Bigger in Texas" | Mastering, Mixing | Warner Records | |
| 2023 | YoungBoy Never Broke Again | Decided 2 | 01. "Free Sex"; 02. "Wrong"; 03. "Bop"; 04. "My Address Public"; 05. "Life n Glory"; 06. "Came a Long Way"; 07. "Better Than Ever" (with Rod Wave); 08. "Play with Us"; 09. "Now Who"; 10. "My Body"; 11. "I'm a Demon"; 12. "Choppa Gizzle"; 13. "Bigger & Better"; 14. "Guitar Hero"; 15. "Deep Down"; 16. "Guapi"; 17. "Freestyle"; 18. "Don't Hurt Me" | Mastering, Mixing, Recording (6) | Never Broke Again, Motown, UMG | |
| 2024 | Never Broke Again | Compliments of Grave Digger Mountain | 01. "4shit" (featuring BBG Baby Joe); 02. "Bling" (featuring YoungBoy Never Broke Again and Lil Dump); 03. "My Bobo" (featuring YoungBoy Never Broke Again and Herm); 04. "How We Get" (featuring YoungBoy Never Broke Again, Lil Dump, Dej RoseGold and WhoGangDee); 05. "Damn Fee" (featuring Quando Rondo) (mastered only) | Mastering, Mixing | Never Broke Again, Motown, UMG | |
| 2024 | Peso Pluma | Éxodo | 17. "Gimme a Second" (with Rich the Kid) | Mixing, Recording | Double P Records | |
| 2024 | Blxst | I'll Always Come Find You | 1. "Paper Route" (with 2 Chainz) | Vocal Engineer | Red Bull, Evgle | |
| 2024 | Shordie Shordie | Breathe of Fresh Air | 01. "Still Be Here"; 02.5 AMAM at the Airport"; My. "On my Own"; 04. "DND"; 05. "Alibi"; 06. "Güd 2 Me"; 07. "It"; 08. "Beautiful Flower"; 09. "Ammo"; 10. "Holster"; 11. "Motor City"; 12. "Keep it Together" | Mastering, Mixing (1–9, 11, 12) (with Skylar Gibbons), Recording (1–4, 6, 7, 9, 12) | Sucker Free Records, Empire | |
| 2024 | YoungBoy Never Broke Again | I Just Got a Lot on My Shoulders | 01. "Versace Shades"; 02. "Never Stopping"; 03. "Catch Me"; 04. "Hope You Make It"; 05. "Sneaking"; 06. "Killa Season"; 07. "Get It"; 08. "Missing Everything" | Mastering, Mixing, Recording (3, 7, 8) | Never Broke Again, Motown | |
