= Never Broke Again =

American record label

- Parent company: Universal Music Group
- Founded: 2015; 11 years ago
- Founder: Kentrell DeSean Gaulden; Kyle "Montana" Claiborne
- Status: Active
- Distributors: Motown (US); UnitedMasters (for independent releases)
- Genre: Hip hop; southern hip hop; gangsta rap
- Country of origin: United States
- Location: Baton Rouge, Louisiana, U.S.
- Official website: neverbrokeagain.com

Never Broke Again, LLC (NBA) is a record label based in Baton Rouge, Louisiana, founded by American rappers YoungBoy Never Broke Again and OG 3Three Never Broke Again in 2015. It was launched as an imprint of Atlantic Records, a division of Warner Music Group until 2022, after which it has operated as an imprint of Motown, a division of Universal Music Group. Never Broke Again has signed and released albums for artists such as Quando Rondo and NoCap, and several upcoming Southern hip hop artists.

== History ==
The NBA label was originally a part of Atlantic Records' when YoungBoy Never Broke Again signed his 5-year record deal with the label and music had begun being officially licensed to a company titled Never Broke Again, LLC. The label has since grown to be independent of Atlantic and is now signed under Motown Records who distribute their music. However, the label also releases independently from Motown through UnitedMasters.

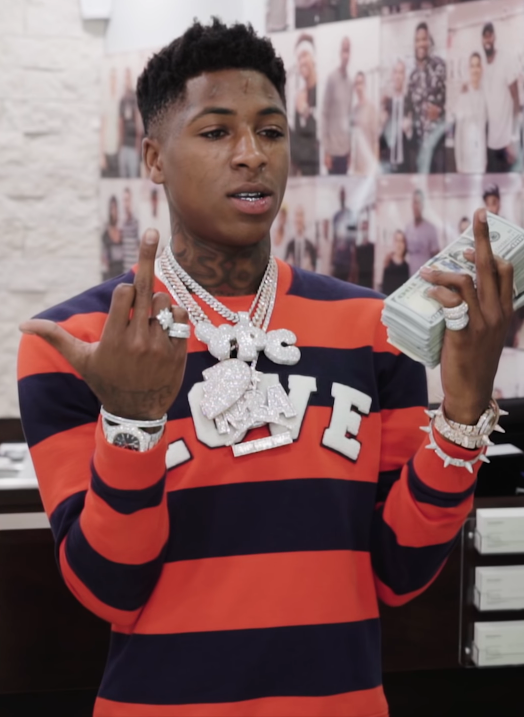
Kentrell "YoungBoy Never Broke Again" Gaulden (pictured) founded Never Broke Again in 2015 with his friends Rodrick "OG3Three" Jeanpierre and Kyle "Montana" Claiborne.

On May 17, 2017, the label released its first compilation project, Extortion Season, distributed by Empire. The project sees appearances from Never Broke Again artists such as NBA Big B, NBA KD, and the label's co-founder, OG 3Three. The collective released their second project together, Ain't 2 Long, which was distributed through UnitedMasters. The compilation sees appearances from D-Dawg, Meechy Baby, NBA Ben 10, NBA Big B, NoCap, Phat Black, P Yungin, Quando Rondo, RJAE, Rojay MLP, and the label's co-founder, YoungBoy Never Broke Again.

On September 8, 2021, following the promotion of Ethiopia Habtemariam to the Chairman and CEO of Motown Records in March, it was announced that Never Broke Again and Motown Records would enter a joint venture deal and the label would be led by Youngboy and Kyle "Montana" Clairborne. When asked in an interview, Habtemariam spoke on her decision to ink the deal with the label:

"I’m excited to work with Never Broke Again, a homegrown brand that has created an incredibly authentic and credible movement that represents the next generation in Louisiana’s legacy of ground-breaking hip-hop labels. I look forward to working with YoungBoy and Montana to continue to grow their vision and reach their fans around the world."

— Ethiopia Habtemariam

YoungBoy noted that for him, the deal had come into place because he "had a responsibility to [his] artists to make sure to find the right partner for [his] label." Clairborne noted that his decision was influenced by the fact that "Motown has been an inspiration for generations – a place that helps develop artists, songwriters and business executives." Maurice "Kenoe" Jordan, a Grammy Awards winning producer and the vice president of A&R of Motown noted that his decision to proceed with the deal was influenced by the fact he is also from Baton Rouge, Louisiana and due to that he has "a great understanding of one another and this partnership was always something that I wanted to bring to Motown." He also noted that "YoungBoy is an incredible visionary whose confidence in his artistry is only outdone by his dedication and work ethic. I’m excited to welcome them into Motown and help bring the Never Broke Again label and brand to the next level."

Following the label's joint venture deal, Never Broke Again released their first project under the label, Never Broke Again: The Compilation, Vol. 1 on November 19, 2021. The eighteen-track project features artists such as Big B, RJae, NoCap, Meechy Baby, P Yungin, RoJay, Herm, Quando Rondo, and NBA YoungBoy, the label's primarily pushed artists.

On June 10, 2022, the label released its first project of the year, Never Broke Again Presents: Green Flag Activity, the title dedicated to the infamous green flags that they use to represent themselves. The sixteen-track album was preceded by two singles, "Pull Up Actin" by YoungBoy Never Broke Again and P Yungin which was released on April 1, 2022, and "Gang Baby" by YoungBoy Never Broke Again and P Yungin featuring RJAE and Rojay MLP. The collective's second project of the year, the Halloween themed Never Broke Again: Nightmare on 38th St was released on October 28, 2022. It was preceded by one single, "Searching" by NBA Ben 10. The project only featured artists from YoungBoy's hometown, Baton Rouge.

== Roster ==
=== Current acts ===
Artists	Year signed	Releases (under the label)	Notes
YoungBoy Never Broke Again	Founder	32	Jointly with Motown, formerly with Atlantic
OG 3Three Never Broke Again	Founder	11	
NBA KD	2015	2	
NBA Big B	2015	3	
BBG Baby Joe	2016	3	
TEN	2016	3	
WhoGangDee	2016	2	
Lil Dump	2016	1	
NBA ChoppaBoyE	2016	1	Jointly with Cash Money Records and Rich Gang
Quando Rondo	2017	7	Jointly with Atlantic
Meechy Baby	2020	3	
Rojay MLP	2020	1	
RJAE	2020	1	Jointly with Roc Nation and Good ForEver LLC
Herm Tha Blacksheep	2021	1	
Vontina	2023	0	
333luhkell	2025	0	
Raqyunginn	2026	0	
Raq Baby	2026	0	Signed by OG 3Three
Mr. T	2026	2	Jointly with Sony Music
Shaquees	2026	2	Signed By YoungBoy Never Broke Again
Xanman		0	Signed By YoungBoy Never Broke Again

=== Former acts ===
Artists	Years under the label	Releases under the label	Notes
GG Extendo	2015-2017	2	Jointly with Never Broke Again
NoCap	2019-2022	5	Jointly with Atlantic
P Yungin	2020-2023	5	Jointly with Motown

=== In-house producers ===
Act	Years under the label	Releases under the label	Notes
As part of Never Broke Again (Recording)
Khris James	2017–present	2	Jointly with Infinity Records LLC; joint publishing with BMI
As part of Never Broke Again, LLC (Publishing)
Jason "Cheese" Goldberg	2021–present	N/A	Joint publishing with JJasonG Publishing West and ASCAP

== Discography ==
=== Compilation albums ===
List of compilation albums
Title	Album details
Ain't 2 Long	Released: October 25, 2020; Label: Never Broke Again, UnitedMasters; Format: Digital download, streaming
The Compilation, Vol. 1	Released: November 19, 2021; Label: Never Broke Again, Motown; Format: Digital download, streaming
Green Flag Activity	Released: June 10, 2022; Label: Never Broke Again, Motown; Format: Digital download, streaming
Nightmare on 38th St	Released: October 28, 2022; Label: Never Broke Again, Motown; Format: Digital download, streaming
Green Flag Activity 2	Released: July 7, 2023; Label: Never Broke Again, Motown; Format: Digital download, streaming
Compliments of Grave Digger Mountain	Released: March 8, 2024; Label: Never Broke Again, Motown; Format: Digital download, streaming

=== Studio albums ===
List of studio albums, with selected details
Artist	Title	Album details
YoungBoy Never Broke Again	Until Death Call My Name	Released: April 27, 2018; Label: Never Broke Again, Atlantic; Format: CD, digital download, streaming
Quando Rondo	QPac	Released: January 10, 2020; Label: Never Broke Again, Atlantic; Format: Digital download, streaming
YoungBoy Never Broke Again	Top	Released: September 11, 2020; Label: Never Broke Again, Atlantic; Format: LP, digital download, streaming
YoungBoy Never Broke Again	Sincerely, Kentrell	Released: September 24, 2021; Label: Never Broke Again, Atlantic; Format: LP, digital download, streaming
NoCap	Mr. Crawford	Released: April 29, 2022; Label: Never Broke Again, Atlantic; Format: Digital download, streaming
YoungBoy Never Broke Again	The Last Slimeto	Released: August 5, 2022; Label: Never Broke Again, Atlantic; Format: CD, LP, digital download, streaming
YoungBoy Never Broke Again	I Rest My Case	Released: January 6, 2023; Label: Never Broke Again, Motown; Format: Digital download, streaming
Quando Rondo	Recovery	Released: March 24, 2023; Label: Never Broke Again, Atlantic; Format: Digital download, streaming
YoungBoy Never Broke Again	Don't Try This at Home	Released: April 21, 2023; Label: Never Broke Again, Motown; Format: Digital download, streaming
Quando Rondo	Here for a Reason	Released: November 15, 2024; Label: Never Broke Again, Atlantic; Format: Digital download, streaming
YoungBoy Never Broke Again	I Just Got a Lot on My Shoulders	Released: December 6, 2024; Label: Never Broke Again, Motown; Format: Digital download, streaming
YoungBoy Never Broke Again	MASA	Released: July 25, 2025; Label: Never Broke Again, Motown; Format: Digital download, streaming
YoungBoy Never Broke Again	Slime Cry	Released: January 16, 2026; Label: Never Broke Again, Motown; Format: Digital download, streaming
Mr. T	The White Album	Released: May 30, 2026; Label: Never Broke Again, Sony Music; Format: Digital download, streaming

=== Mixtapes ===
List of mixtapes, with selected details
Artist	Title	Mixtape details
YoungBoy Never Broke Again & Moneybagg Yo	Fed Baby's	Released: November 16, 2017; Label: Never Broke Again, Bread Gang, CMG, Interscope; Format: Digital download, streaming
YoungBoy Never Broke Again	AI YoungBoy 2	Released: October 11, 2019; Label: Never Broke Again, Atlantic; Format: LP, digital download, streaming
YoungBoy Never Broke Again	Still Flexin, Still Steppin	Released: February 21, 2020; Label: Never Broke Again, Atlantic; Format: Digital download, streaming
YoungBoy Never Broke Again	38 Baby 2	Released: April 24, 2020; Label: Never Broke Again, Atlantic; Format: Digital download, streaming
YoungBoy Never Broke Again & Rich the Kid	Nobody Safe	Released: November 20, 2020; Label: Never Broke Again, Rich Forever, Empire; Format: Digital download, streaming
YoungBoy Never Broke Again	Colors	Released: January 21, 2022; Label: Never Broke Again, Atlantic; Format: Digital download, streaming
YoungBoy Never Broke Again & DaBaby	Better than You	Released: March 4, 2022; Label: Never Broke Again, South Coast, Interscope, Atlantic; Format: Digital download, streaming
YoungBoy Never Broke Again	Realer 2	Released: September 7, 2022; Label: Never Broke Again, Atlantic; Format: Digital download, streaming
YoungBoy Never Broke Again	3800 Degrees	Released: October 7, 2022; Label: Never Broke Again, Atlantic; Format: Digital download, streaming
YoungBoy Never Broke Again	Ma' I Got a Family	Released: October 21, 2022; Label: Never Broke Again, Atlantic; Format: Digital download, streaming
YoungBoy Never Broke Again & Quando Rondo	3860	Released: November 25, 2022; Label: Never Broke Again, Atlantic; Format: Digital download, streaming
YoungBoy Never Broke Again	Richest Opp	Released: May 12, 2023; Label: Never Broke Again, Motown; Format: Digital download, streaming
YoungBoy Never Broke Again	Decided 2	Released: November 10, 2023; Label: Never Broke Again, Motown; Format: Digital download, streaming

=== Singles ===
List of singles, showing artist, year released, and album name
Title	Artist	Year	Album
"Family Friendly Fade"	Mr. T	2026	Non-album single

=== Singles ===
Title	Year	Album
"Cutlass" (with Meechy Baby)	2021	Never Broke Again: The Compilation, Vol. 1
"Pull Up Actin" (with YoungBoy Never Broke Again & P Yungin)	2022	Green Flag Activity
"Gang Baby" with YoungBoy Never Broke Again & P Yungin (featuring Rojay MLP, RJAE)	2022	Green Flag Activity
"Searching" (with NBA Ben 10)	2022	Nightmare on 38th St
"Realize" (featuring Lil Dump, Rojay MLP & NBA Big B)	2023	Green Flag Activity, Vol. 2

=== Artist releases ===
==== Studio albums ====
Year	Album details	Details
2018	YoungBoy Never Broke Again – Until Death Call My Name: Released: April 27, 2018; Label: Never Broke Again, APG, Atlantic Records; Formats: Digital download, streaming	Chart position: No. 7 U.S.; RIAA Certificate: Platinum
2020	Quando Rondo – QPac: Released: January 10, 2020; Label: Never Broke Again, Atlantic; Formats: Digital download, streaming	Chart position: No. 22 U.S.
2020	YoungBoy Never Broke Again – Top: Released: September 11, 2020; Label: Never Broke Again, APG, Atlantic; Formats: CD (Limited), LP, digital download, streaming	Chart position: No. 1 U.S.; RIAA Certificate: Platinum
2021	YoungBoy Never Broke Again – Sincerely, Kentrell: Released: September 24, 2021; Label: Never Broke Again, Atlantic; Formats: CD, LP, digital download, streaming	Chart position: No. 1 U.S.; RIAA Certificate: Platinum
2022	NoCap – Mr. Crawford: Released: April 29, 2022; Label: Never Broke Again, Atlantic; Formats: CD, digital download, streaming	Chart position: No. 8 U.S.
2022	YoungBoy Never Broke Again – The Last Slimeto: Released: August 5, 2022; Label: Never Broke Again, Atlantic; Formats: CD, LP, digital download, streaming	Chart position: No. 2 U.S.; RIAA Certificate: Gold
2023	YoungBoy Never Broke Again – I Rest My Case: Released: January 6, 2023; Label: Never Broke Again, Motown; Formats:Digital download, streaming	Chart position: No. 9 U.S.
2023	Quando Rondo – Recovery: Released: March 24, 2023; Label: Quando Rondo LLC, Never Broke Again, Atlantic; Formats: CD, digital download, streaming	
2023	YoungBoy Never Broke Again – Don't Try This At Home: Released: April 21, 2023; Label: Never Broke Again, Motown; Formats: Digital download, streaming	Chart position: No. 5 U.S.
2024	Quando Rondo – Here For a Reason: Released: November 15, 2024; Label: Quando Rondo LLC, Never Broke Again, Atlantic; Formats: Digital download, streaming	
2024	YoungBoy Never Broke Again – I Just Got a Lot on My Shoulders: Released: December 6, 2024; Label: Never Broke Again, Motown; Formats: Digital download, streaming	

==== Extended plays ====
Year	Album details	Details
2018	YoungBoy Never Broke Again – 4Respect: Released: August 24, 2018; Label: Never Broke Again, Atlantic; Formats: Digital download, streaming	Chart position: No. 19 U.S.
2018	YoungBoy Never Broke Again – 4Freedom: Released: August 30, 2018; Label: Never Broke Again, Atlantic; Formats: Digital download, streaming	Chart position: No. 100 U.S.
2018	YoungBoy Never Broke Again – 4Loyalty: Released: September 6, 2018; Label: Never Broke Again, Atlantic; Formats: Digital download, streaming	Chart position: No. 19 U.S.
2024	Quando Rondo – Here for a Reason: In The Darkest Time: Released: August 16, 2024; Label: Quando Rondo LLC, Never Broke Again, Atlantic; Formats: Digital download, streaming	

==== Compilation albums ====
Year	Album details	Details
2018	YoungBoy Never Broke Again – 4Respect 4Freedom 4Loyalty 4WhatImportant: Released: September 14, 2018; Label: Never Broke Again, Atlantic; Formats: digital download, streaming	Chart position: No. 14 U.S.; RIAA Certificate: Platinum
2021	NBA KD – Lost Files: Released: May 15, 2021; Label: Never Broke Again, UnitedMasters; Formats: digital download, streaming	
2022	YoungBoy Never Broke Again – Lost Files: Released: December 23, 2022; Label: Never Broke Again, Atlantic; Formats: digital download, streaming	Chart position: No. 45 U.S.

==== Mixtapes ====
Year	Artist – Album	Details
2015	YoungBoy Never Broke Again – Life Before Fame	Released: April 10, 2015; Label: Never Broke Again, 101 Distribution; Formats: digital download
2015	YoungBoy Never Broke Again – Mind of a Menace	Released: December 1, 2015; Label: Never Broke Again, 101 Distribution; Formats: digital download
2016	YoungBoy Never Broke Again – Mind of a Menace 2	Released: April 1, 2016; Label: Never Broke Again, Atlantic; Formats: digital download
2016	YoungBoy Never Broke Again – Before I Go	Released: June 27, 2016; Label: Never Broke Again, Atlantic; Formats: digital download, streaming
2016	YoungBoy Never Broke Again – 38 Baby	Released: October 27, 2016; Label: Never Broke Again, Atlantic; Formats: digital download, streaming
2016	YoungBoy Never Broke Again – Mind of a Menace 3	Released: November 4, 2016; Label: Never Broke Again, Atlantic; Formats: digital download, streaming
2017	YoungBoy Never Broke Again – AI YoungBoy	Released: August 4, 2017; Label: Never Broke Again, Atlantic; Formats: digital download, streaming; Chart position: No. 24 U.S.; RIAA Certificate: Platinum
2017	YoungBoy Never Broke Again – Ain't Too Long	Released: October 7, 2017; Label: Never Broke Again, Atlantic; Formats: digital download, streaming; Chart position: No. 173 U.S.
2017	YoungBoy Never Broke Again and Moneybagg Yo – Fed Baby's'	Released: November 16, 2017; Label: Never Broke Again, Atlantic, Bread Gang, N-Less, Interscope, Collective; Formats: Digital download, streaming; Chart position: No. 21 U.S.
2018	YoungBoy Never Broke Again – Master the Day of Judgement	Released: May 19, 2018; Label: Never Broke Again, Atlantic; Formats: digital download, streaming; Chart position: No. 139 U.S.
2018	BBG Baby Joe – NBA Gurilla	Released: August 17, 2018; Label: Never Broke Again, Cinematic Music Group, Ingrooves; Formats: digital download, streaming
2018	YoungBoy Never Broke Again – Decided	Released: September 7, 2018; Label: Never Broke Again, Atlantic; Formats: digital download, streaming; Chart position: No. 41 U.S.; RIAA Certificate: Gold
2018	Quando Rondo – Life After Fame	Released: September 24, 2018; Label: Never Broke Again, Atlantic; Formats: digital download, streaming; Chart position: No. 174 U.S.
2018	YoungBoy Never Broke Again and VL Deck – Kane & O-Dog	Released: October 19, 2018; Label: Never Broke Again, Atlantic, Section 8 Entertainment, Empire; Formats: digital download, streaming
2018	YoungBoy Never Broke Again – Realer	Released: December 20, 2018; Label: Never Broke Again, Atlantic; Formats: digital download, streaming; Chart position: No. 15 U.S.; RIAA Certificate: Platinum
2019	BBG Baby Joe – Boo Mode 4.0	Released: February 4, 2019; Label: Never Broke Again, Cinematic, Ingrooves; Formats: digital download, streaming
2019	NBA Big B – 5th God	Released: April 26, 2019; Label: Never Broke Again, Empire; Formats: digital download, streaming
2019	Quando Rondo – From the Neighborhood to the Stage	Released: May 10, 2019; Label: Never Broke Again, Atlantic; Formats: digital download, streaming; Chart position: No. 29 U.S.
2019	NoCap – The Backend Child	Released: May 28, 2019; Label: Never Broke Again, Atlantic; Formats: digital download, streaming; Chart position: No. 170 U.S.
2019	BBG Baby Joe – B4 Its All Said & Done	Released: August 19, 2019; Label: Never Broke Again, Cinematic, Ingrooves; Formats: digital download, streaming
2019	YoungBoy Never Broke Again – AI YoungBoy 2	Released: October 11, 2019; Label: Never Broke Again, Atlantic; Formats: LP, Digital download, streaming; Chart position: No. 1 U.S.; RIAA Certificate: 2× Platinum
2019	NoCap – The Hood Dictionary	Released: November 19, 2019; Label: Never Broke Again, Atlantic; Formats: digital download, streaming; Chart position: No. 80 U.S.
2020	YoungBoy Never Broke Again – Still Flexin, Still Steppin	Released: February 21, 2020; Label: Never Broke Again, Atlantic; Formats: digital download, streaming; Chart position: No. 2 U.S.; RIAA Certificate: Gold
2020	YoungBoy Never Broke Again – 38 Baby 2	Released: April 24, 2020; Label: Never Broke Again, Atlantic; Formats: LP, Digital download, streaming; Chart position: No. 1 U.S.; RIAA Certificate: Gold
2020	NBA Big B – Thoughts of a Demon	Released: June 5, 2020; Label: Never Broke Again, Foundation Media; Formats: Digital download, streaming
2020	NoCap – Steel Human	Released: July 16, 2020; Label: Never Broke Again, Atlantic; Formats: digital download, streaming; Chart position: No. 31 U.S.
2020	Quando Rondo – Diary of a Lost Child	Released: August 26, 2020; Label: Never Broke Again, Atlantic; Formats: digital download, streaming
2020	OG 3Three Never Broke Again – The Appetizer	Released: October 2, 2020; Label: Never Broke Again, MNRK Music Group; Formats: digital download, streaming
2020	YoungBoy Never Broke Again – Until I Return	Released: November 11, 2020; Label: Never Broke Again, Atlantic; Formats: digital download, streaming; Chart position: No. 10 U.S.
2020	YoungBoy Never Broke Again and Rich the Kid – Nobody Safe	Released: November 20, 2020; Label: Never Broke Again, Atlantic, Rich Forever Music, Empire; Formats: CD, LP, Digital download, streaming; Chart position: No. 43 U.S.
2020	P Yungin – Demons Everywhere I Go	Released: December 10, 2020; Label: Never Broke Again, UnitedMasters; Formats: digital download, streaming
2021	P Yungin – Let Me Go Home Alone	Released: April 30, 2021; Label: Never Broke Again, UnitedMasters; Formats: digital download, streaming
2021	Quando Rondo – Still Taking Risks	Released: May 7, 2021; Label: Never Broke Again, Atlantic; Formats: digital download, streaming; Chart position: No. 101 U.S.
2021	NBA KD – Lost Files 2	Released: May 23, 2021; Label: Never Broke Again, UnitedMasters; Formats: digital download, streaming
2021	P Yungin – Retaliation	Released: July 23, 2021; Label: Never Broke Again, UnitedMasters; Formats: digital download, streaming
2021	YoungBoy Never Broke Again and Birdman – From the Bayou	Released: December 10, 2021; Label: Never Broke Again, Atlantic, Cash Money; Formats: digital download, streaming; Chart position: No. 2 U.S.
2022	YoungBoy Never Broke Again – Colors	Released: January 21, 2022; Label: Never Broke Again, Atlantic; Formats: CD, LP, Digital download, streaming; Chart position: No. 2 U.S.; RIAA Certificate: Gold
2022	P Yungin – KAM	Released: January 28, 2022; Label: Never Broke Again, Motown, UMG; Formats: Digital download, streaming
2022	Meechy Baby – Ratchet Talk	Released: February 25, 2022; Label: Never Broke Again, Motown, UMG; Formats: Digital download, streaming
2022	YoungBoy Never Broke Again and DaBaby – Better than You	Released: March 4, 2022; Label: Never Broke Again, Atlantic, Interscope, South Coast Music Group; Formats: CD, LP, Digital download, streaming; Chart position: No. 10 U.S.
2022	YoungBoy Never Broke Again – Realer 2	Released: September 6, 2022; Label: Never Broke Again, Atlantic; Formats: Digital download, streaming; Chart position: No. 6 U.S.
2022	P Yungin – DOY	Released: September 23, 2022; Label: Never Broke Again, Motown, UMG; Formats: Digital download, streaming
2022	YoungBoy Never Broke Again – 3800 Degrees	Released: October 7, 2022; Label: Never Broke Again, Atlantic; Formats: Digital download, streaming; Chart position: No. 12 U.S.
2022	YoungBoy Never Broke Again – Ma’ I Got A Family	Released: October 21, 2022; Label: Never Broke Again, Atlantic; Formats: Digital download, streaming; Chart position: No. 7 U.S.
2022	Meechy Baby – Who is Meechy 2	Released: November 11, 2022; Label: Never Broke Again, Motown, UMG; Formats: Digital download, streaming
2022	Quando Rondo and YoungBoy Never Broke Again – 3860	Released: November 25, 2022; Label: Quando Rondo LLC, Never Broke Again, Atlantic; Formats: Digital download, streaming; Chart position: No. 62 U.S.
2022	NoCap – The Main Bird	Released: December 16, 2022; Label: Never Broke Again, Atlantic; Formats: Digital download, streaming
2022	WhoGangDee Never Broke Again – Skully Scene 2	Released: December 30, 2022; Label: Never Broke Again, UnitedMasters; Formats: Digital download, streaming
2023		
2023	OG 3Three – Show No Slack	Released: January 13, 2023; Label: Never Broke Again, Empire; Formats: Digital download, streaming
2023	Rojay MLP – Ignore The Hate	Released: February 2, 2023; Label: Never Broke Again, UnitedMasters; Formats: Digital download, streaming
2023	OG 3Three – Sincere	Released: February 14, 2023; Label: Never Broke Again, Empire; Formats: Digital download, streaming
2023	NBA Big B – Tru Scars	Released: February 17, 2023; Label: Never Broke Again, UnitedMasters; Formats: Digital download, streaming
2023	YoungBoy Never Broke Again – Richest Opp	Released: May 12, 2023; Label: Never Broke Again, Motown; Formats: Digital download, streaming; Chart position: No. 5 U.S.
2023	RJAE – YOU'RE THE PROBLEM	Released:June 16, 2023; Label: Never Broke Again, Roc Nation, Good ForEver LLC; Formats: Digital download, streaming
2023	Herm Tha Blacksheep – Reborn	Released: June 21, 2023; Label: Never Broke Again, UnitedMasters; Formats: Digital download, streaming
2023	NBACHOPPABOYE – Pain Real	Released: June 23, 2023; Label: Never Broke Again, Cash Money Records, Rich Gang, DistroKidd; Formats: Digital download, streaming
2023	NBA Big B – Streets Aint Safe	Released: June 26, 2023; Label: Never Broke Again, UnitedMasters; Formats: Digital download, streaming
2023	YoungBoy Never Broke Again – Decided 2	Released: November 10, 2023; Label: Never Broke Again, Motown; Formats: Digital download, streaming; Chart position: No. 17 U.S.
2024	WhoGangDee Never Broke Again – The Biggest Owl	Released: November 1, 2024; Label: Never Broke Again, UnitedMasters; Formats: Digital download, streaming
