= Make America Slime Again Tour =

2025 concert tour by YoungBoy Never Broke Again

- Tour by YoungBoy Never Broke Again
- Location: United States
- Associated albums: MASA
- Start date: September 1, 2025
- End date: November 12, 2025
- Legs: 1
- No. of shows: 42
- Supporting acts: DeeBaby; K3; Lil Dump; NoCap; Offset; Toosii; Baby Mel
- Attendance: 553,565 (42 shows)
- Box office: $69,820,786 (42 shows)

YoungBoy Never Broke Again concert chronology
- Still Flexin, Still Steppin Tour (2020); Make America Slime Again Tour (2025)

The Make America Slime Again Tour (abbreviated as MASA Tour) was the fourth concert tour by American rapper YoungBoy Never Broke Again, in support of his eighth studio album, MASA (2025). The tour commenced on September 1, 2025, in Dallas, Texas, and concluded on November 12, 2025, in Seattle, Washington, consisting of 42 shows. The tour is Gaulden's first in five years since his Still Flexin, Still Steppin Tour in 2020. With a gross of over $69,820,786 based on 42 shows, the Make America Slime Again Tour is the tenth-highest-grossing tour by a rapper or hip hop artist in history.

Originally a 27-date-long arena tour, the tour was given new dates on several occasions due to increasingly high demand following its pre-sale, leading to an additional 18 dates being added to the tour: 5 in May, and 13 in June. Gaulden's set includes songs from different eras of his career; despite the tour supporting MASA, few songs are played from the album. The tour's supporting acts are DeeBaby, K3, Lil Dump, NoCap, Offset, and Toosii, with NoCap and Toosii switching for certain dates. Kevin Gates, Sexyy Red, Boosie Badazz, Yeat, Birdman, BossMan Dlow, Shy Glizzy, Skrilla, DJ Khaled, Hunxho, and several other rappers appeared as guest performers throughout the tour. Teyana Taylor helped coordinate the creative photography and production direction for the tour.

== Background ==
On September 2, 2022, Gaulden's manager, Alex Junier, confirmed that he would embark on a 30-stop tour upon his release from house arrest with Never Broke Again signee, Quando Rondo. Junier later revealed that Chicago would be the first stop on the tour, seemingly a dig at Chicago-based rapper, Lil Durk who Gaulden was in a publicized feud with, at the time. However, on November 23, Gaulden took to his Instagram to denounce the tour, stating that he turned down a tour deal worth over $15 million: "Every $15 million tour come my way getting turned down. I don't wanna do another show. I don't want nothing but a bigger house. It gave me time for myself. My daughter know who I am – I know who I am".

After years of being under house arrest, Gaulden was officially released on probation in April 2025. Upon his release, on May 3, Gaulden released the tracks "Where I Been" and "Shot Callin" before his associate, Kyle "Montana" Claiborne revealed that he's working on an album and a tour. On May 15, Gaulden and his Never Broke Again label announced the tour and its dates in a promotional trailer, revealing that tickets would be up for sale on May 20.

Following the tour's pre-sale on May 15, resulting in several dates completely selling out, an additional five dates were added to the tour. On May 18, EBK Jaaybo, a supporting act on the tour was arrested by Arkansas State Police for felony firearm charges. This resulted in rumors that he had been removed from the tour, which were later deemed false.

On May 29, 2025, Gaulden was granted a presidential pardon by Donald Trump, permitting him to not have to submit to his previous probation restrictions. Days later, on June 2, Gaulden and his team took to Instagram to announce an additional 13 dates due to high demand.

On June 16, Gaulden took to his Instagram to announce that his album would drop on July 4, the day of independence for the United States, seemingly matching the name of his tour, which refers to Make America Great Again.

Ahead of the first date of Gaulden's Make America Slime Again Tour in Dallas, Texas, he donated $50,000 to two non-profit charities, Manifest Freedom and Urban Specialists. Gaulden appeared on WFAA news and said: "You know, a lot of people be getting hurt, so it ain't really cool at this point to me, [...] I just want to help in any way I can".

== Concert synopsis ==
The Make America Slime Again Tour concerts are divided into three acts. They are often performed without guest appearances; however, there are exceptions on certain dates, during which Gaulden may choose to bring out a guest performer, for example, during the tour's first night, Kevin Gates joined Gaulden to perform their song, "TTG".

Gaulden's sets were often lit with a gloomy, dark green color. The choreography, directed by Teyana Taylor's The Aunties Production, featured numerous women dressed in "military colors", as was Gaulden who adopted a mix of a hip-hop and rock fashion style. Gaulden's outfits often incorporate leather jackets, wallet chains, large boots, gloves, and bedazzled belts.

The stage screen often played videos of a cemetery with tombstones in the background, with hallucinations of ghosts rising above several Crucifixes, giving a spooky aesthetic. The stage set-up included a model house with American flags, in reference to the cover art of his album, MASA. The shows opened with the first verse from "MASA". Gaulden made his stage entrance through a coffin descending from above with Gaulden inside, with "his hands draped over his chest like a Chrome Hearts Dracula". As the coffin descended, "a line of dancers in American flag bandanas and fatigue skirts" shot fake rifles at a coffin descending from above with Gaulden inside.

On several occasions, the model house on the stage would break in half with the roof lifting off so that Gaulden could "start aggressively rapping, standing supreme while the house crumbles around him", which critics would compare to the 2025 horror, Sinners. Thousands of people at the shows were equipped with green bandanas, which were being sold by vendors outside the arenas for $7 each, with critics noting that the shows resemble a "2000s video game set in the Florida Keys swamp". Critics also pointed out the "pungent" smell of cannabis in the arena, despite it being prohibited.

== Critical reception ==
The tour received highly positive reviews from critics, who praised Gaulden's performance.

Reviewing the tour's fourth night in Houston, Texas, DeVaughn Douglas for the Houston Press wrote that "the stage show itself also reflected [Gaulden's] growth" and that "what once was a no-frills display of raw mixtape energy has evolved into a full-scale production", praising the tour's production. He continued, writing that "the show underscored how far YoungBoy has come as a performer" and that Gaulden balances "raw energy" with "production designed for arenas". Reviewing the same night in Houston, Shawn Grant for The Source wrote that "everything about the show was turned up" and that "the bass was so heavy you could feel it in your chest", continuing that "the lights and visuals kept shifting with every beat, and YoungBoy's dancers and team made sure the momentum never dipped". Grant concluded, writing that "this wasn't just a rap concert. It was a generational moment". In a review of the tour seventh night in Oakland, California, Riff Magazine's AJ Tinio wrote that Gaulden "delivered a theatrical, tightly focused set that leaned heavily into the tour's green theme".

In a review of the tour's seventeenth night in Newark, New Jersey, Jayson Buford of Rolling Stone begun his review, noting that the number of songs Gaulden performed was almost "overwhelming" and that despite the potential of "a sensory overload", you will never be bored by Gaulden's "compulsion, appetites, or his enduring melancholy that exist in the fog of the music, even when he is being violent, even when he is an egotistical maximalist". Commenting on the stage design, Buford wrote that "compared to other rap tours, YoungBoy's stage design was more catered to the contemporary rap fan than to an elitist crowd", describing the concert as "a carnival of distrust". In another positive review of the tour's seventeenth night in Newark, New Jersey, The Fader's Dylan Green wrote that "the crowd's energy rarely faltered throughout the night" and that Gaulden "approached the show with a quiet magnetism". Green Continued writing that "every ballad [became] the largest karaoke session in Newark". Green concluded his review noting that, "the bleeding heart at the center of his music rang even louder than the cries of the adoring arena".

== Commercial performance ==
After the final show, the rapper was declared the first artist from Baton Rouge to sell out more than 40 arenas on a single tour, with 42 shows in total. Reportedly, the tour made $75 million in total revenue with 500,000 tickets sold and every show sold out.

== Set list ==
This set list is representative of the show in Dallas, Texas, on September 1, 2025. It does not represent all of the concerts for the duration of the tour.

1. "MASA"
2. "Dangerous Love"
3. "Kacey Talk"
4. "Lil Top"
5. "I Came Thru"
6. "Right Foot Creep"
7. "Bitch Let's Do It" (Interlude)
8. "No Smoke"
9. "Sexin Me"
10. "Kick Yo Door"
11. "I Got the Bag”
12. "Wagwan"
13. "Bad Morning"
14. "Bad Bad" (Interlude)
15. "Gravity"
16. "TTG"
17. "I Got that Shit"
18. "Ranada"
19. "Nevada"
20. "Untouchable"
21. "Games of War"
22. "Smoke Strong"
23. "Never Stopping"
24. "Where I Been"
25. "Finest"
26. "Shot Callin"
27. "Survivor" (Interlude)
28. "Slime Belief"
29. "Fresh Prince of Utah"
30. "Valuable Pain"
31. "Death Enclaimed"
32. "Life Support"
33. "All In"
34. "Heart & Soul" (Interlude)
35. "XXX"
36. "Vette Motors"
37. "Bring 'Em Out"
38. "Outside Today"
39. "Top Tingz”
40. "The Last Backyard..."
41. "Next"
42. "Black Ball"
43. "Kickboxer"
44. "How I Been"
45. "Chopper City"
46. "Dead Trollz"
47. "Lonely Child"
48. "I Hate YoungBoy" (Outro)

=== Notes ===
- During the September 1 show in Dallas, Kevin Gates joined Gaulden on-stage to perform "Power" and "TTG".
- During the September 6 show in Houston, OTB Fastlane joined Gaulden on-stage to perform "Look Like Money" and Crank".
- During the September 10 show in Los Angeles, Sexyy Red joined Gaulden on-stage to perform "Pound Town" and "Bow Bow Bow (F My Baby Dad)".
- On the September 13 show in Sacramento, Gaulden performed "Red Eye", "Ten Talk", "Murder Business", and "Hot Now".
- During the October 1 show in Washington, D.C., Boosie Badazz and Shy Glizzy joined Gaulden on-stage to perform "Set It Off" and "White Girl".
- During the October 3 show in Philadelphia, Skrilla joined Gaulden on-stage to perform "Doot Doot (6 7)".
- Starting with the October 9 show in Columbia, "Bring the Hook", "Green Dot", "We Poppin", "Deep Down", "Put It on Me", "Bandit", "What You Is", and "You the One", were added to the setlist; Birdman joined Gaulden on-stage to perform "We Poppin".
- During the October 11 show in Orlando, Gaulden also performed "House Arrest Tingz" and "Make No Sense"; Birdman joined Gaulden on-stage to perform "100 Rounds".
- During the October 13 show in Miami, BossMan Dlow joined Gaulden on-stage to perform "Get in with Me" and DJ Khaled made an on-stage appearance.
- During the October 15 show in Atlanta, Pluto and YK Niece joined Gaulden on-stage to perform "Whim Whamiee", Hunxho joined Gaulden on-stage to perform "Highly Performing"; Boosie joined Gaulden on-stage to perform "Set It Off"; and Birdman and Herm tha Blacksheep joined Gaulden on-stage to perform "Fuck That Nigga".
- During the October 19 show in New Orleans, Sexyy Red joined Gaulden on-stage to perform "Bow Bow Bow (F My Baby Dad)" and Birdman and Herm tha Blacksheep joined Gaulden on-stage to perform "Fuck That Nigga".
- During the October 20 show in New Orleans, Gaulden also performed "Carter Son", "Gunsmoke", "No. 9", "38 Baby", and "Purge Me".
- During the October 30 show in Dallas, Big Yavo joined Gaulden on-stage to perform "No Pen" and "Webbie Flow".
- During the November 9 show in Dallas, Yeat joined Gaulden on-stage to perform "Flawless", "Come n Go", and "IDGAF".

== Shows ==
| Date | City | Country | Venue | Opening act(s) | Attendance | Revenue |
|---|---|---|---|---|---|---|
| September 1, 2025 | Dallas | United States | American Airlines Center | K3, Lil Dump, Dee Baby, Toosii, Offset | 29,691 / 29,691 (100%) | $3,914,926 |
| September 2, 2025 | Dallas | United States | American Airlines Center | K3, Lil Dump, Dee Baby, Toosii, Offset | 29,691 / 29,691 (100%) | $3,914,926 |
| September 5, 2025 | Austin | United States | Moody Center | K3, Lil Dump, Dee Baby, Toosii, Offset | 12,631 / 12,631 (100%) | $1,733,725 |
| September 6, 2025 | Houston | United States | Toyota Center | K3, Lil Dump, Dee Baby, Toosii, Offset | 12,971 / 12,971 (100%) | $1,854,072 |
| September 9, 2025 | Los Angeles | United States | Crypto.com Arena | K3, Lil Dump, Dee Baby, Toosii, Offset | 27,798 / 27,798 (100%) | $3,809,244 |
| September 10, 2025 | Los Angeles | United States | Crypto.com Arena | K3, Lil Dump, Dee Baby, Toosii, Offset | 27,798 / 27,798 (100%) | $3,809,244 |
| September 12, 2025 | Oakland | United States | Oakland Arena | K3, Lil Dump, Dee Baby, Toosii, Offset | 12,893 / 12,893 (100%) | $1,317,547 |
| September 13, 2025 | Sacramento | United States | Golden 1 Center | K3, Lil Dump, Dee Baby, Toosii, Offset | 13,683 / 13,683 (100%) | $1,476,648 |
| September 15, 2025 | Phoenix | United States | PHX Arena | K3, Lil Dump, Dee Baby, Toosii, Offset | 13,219 / 13,219 (100%) | $1,442,177 |
| September 17, 2025 | Denver | United States | Ball Arena | K3, Lil Dump, Dee Baby, Toosii, Offset | 13,428 / 13,428 (100%) | $1,559,327 |
| September 20, 2025 | St. Louis | United States | Enterprise Center | K3, Lil Dump, Dee Baby, Toosii, Offset | 13,174 / 13,174 (100%) | $1,598,327 |
| September 21, 2025 | Kansas City | United States | T-Mobile Center | K3, Lil Dump, Dee Baby, Toosii, Offset | 13,386 / 13,386 (100%) | $1,415,408 |
| September 22, 2025 | Minneapolis | United States | Target Center | K3, Lil Dump, Dee Baby, Toosii, Offset | 13,208 / 13,208 (100%) | $993,136 |
| September 25, 2025 | Columbus | United States | Nationwide Arena | K3, Lil Dump, Dee Baby, Toosii, Offset | 14,241 / 14,241 (100%) | $1,841,339 |
| September 27, 2025 | Brooklyn | United States | Barclays Center | K3, Lil Dump, Dee Baby, Toosii, Offset | 13,569 / 13,569 (100%) | $1,998,945 |
| September 28, 2025 | Boston | United States | TD Garden | K3, Lil Dump, Dee Baby, Toosii, Offset | 13,386 / 13,386 (100%) | $1,761,070 |
| September 29, 2025 | Newark | United States | Prudential Center | K3, Lil Dump, Dee Baby, Toosii, Offset | 12,847 / 12,847 (100%) | $1,547,872 |
| October 1, 2025 | Washington, D.C. | United States | Capital One Arena | K3, Lil Dump, Dee Baby, Toosii, Offset | 13/310 / 13,310 (100%) | $2,193,460 |
| October 3, 2025 | Philadelphia | United States | Xfinity Mobile Arena | K3, Lil Dump, Dee Baby, Toosii, Offset | 13,937 / 13,937 (100%) | $2,372,938 |
| October 4, 2025 | Baltimore | United States | CFG Bank Arena | K3, Lil Dump, Dee Baby, Toosii, Offset | 12,701 / 12,701 (100%) | $1,878,344 |
| October 8, 2025 | Columbia | United States | Colonial Life Arena | K3, Lil Dump, Dee Baby, Toosii, Offset | 24,991 / 24,991 (100%) | $3,384,859 |
| October 9, 2025 | Columbia | United States | Colonial Life Arena | K3, Lil Dump, Dee Baby, Toosii, Offset | 24,991 / 24,991 (100%) | $3,384,859 |
| October 10, 2025 | Jacksonville | United States | VyStar Veterans Memorial Arena | K3, Lil Dump, Dee Baby, Toosii, Offset | 12,390 / 12,390 (100%) | $1,491,034 |
| October 11, 2025 | Orlando | United States | Kia Center | K3, Lil Dump, Dee Baby, Toosii, Offset | 13,487 / 13,487 (100%) | $2,102,089 |
| October 13, 2025 | Miami | United States | Kaseya Center | K3, Lil Dump, Dee Baby, NoCap, Offset | 13,166 / 13,166 (100%) | $1,291,977 |
| October 15, 2025 | Atlanta | United States | State Farm Arena | K3, Lil Dump, Dee Baby, Toosii, Offset | 13,286 / 13,286 (100%) | $2,051,727 |
| October 16, 2025 | Nashville | United States | Bridgestone Arena | K3, Lil Dump, Dee Baby, NoCap, Offset | 13,395 / 13,395 (100%) | $1,497,189 |
| October 19, 2025 | New Orleans | United States | Smoothie King Center | K3, Lil Dump, Dee Baby, NoCap, Offset | 27,306 / 27,306 (100%) | $4,051,408 |
| October 20, 2025 | New Orleans | United States | Smoothie King Center | K3, Lil Dump, Dee Baby, NoCap, Offset | 27,306 / 27,306 (100%) | $4,051,408 |
| October 22, 2025 (Note: Rescheduled from October 18, 2025.) | Birmingham | United States | Legacy Arena | K3, Lil Dump, Dee Baby, NoCap, Offset | 12,237 / 12,237 (100%) | $1,437,744 |
| October 24, 2025 | Raleigh | United States | Lenovo Center | K3, Lil Dump, Dee Baby, Toosii, Offset | 13,307 / 13,307 (100%) | $1,521,272 |
| October 26, 2025 | Charlotte | United States | Spectrum Center | K3, Lil Dump, Dee Baby, NoCap, Offset | 13,225 / 13,225 (100%) | $1,457,749 |
| October 28, 2025 | Houston | United States | Toyota Center | K3, Lil Dump, Dee Baby, NoCap, Offset | 13,271 / 13,271 (100%) | $1,115,207 |
| October 29, 2025 | San Antonio | United States | Frost Bank Center | K3, Lil Dump, Dee Baby, NoCap, Offset | 13,339 / 13,339 (100%) | $1,543,730 |
| October 30, 2025 | Dallas | United States | American Airlines Center | K3, Lil Dump, Dee Baby, NoCap, Offset | 13,218 / 13,218 (100%) | $1,193,852 |
| November 1, 2025 | Oklahoma City | United States | Paycom Center | K3, Lil Dump, Dee Baby, NoCap, Offset | 13,291 / 13,291 (100%) | $1,198,004 |
| November 5, 2025 | Anaheim | United States | Honda Center | K3, Lil Dump, Dee Baby, NoCap, Offset | 13,391 / 13,391 (100%) | $1,190,004 |
| November 6, 2025 | Glendale | United States | Desert Diamond Arena | K3, Lil Dump, Dee Baby, NoCap, Offset | 13,311 / 13,311 (100%) | $1,193,265 |
| November 7, 2025 | San Diego | United States | Viejas Arena | K3, Lil Dump, Dee Baby, NoCap, Offset | 8,079 / 8,079 (100%) | $905,131 |
| November 9, 2025 | Las Vegas | United States | T-Mobile Arena | K3, Lil Dump, Dee Baby, NoCap, Offset | 15,543 / 15,543 (100%) | $1,841,258 |
| November 11, 2025 | Portland | United States | Moda Center | K3, Lil Dump, Dee Baby, NoCap, Offset | 11,181 / 11,181 (100%) | $585,285 |
| November 12, 2025 | Seattle | United States | Climate Pledge Arena | K3, Lil Dump, Dee Baby, NoCap, Offset | 13,589 / 13,589 (100%) | $1,438,301 |
| Total | | | | | 553,565 | $69,820,786 (42 shows) |

=== Cancelled shows ===
List of cancelled concerts, showing date, city, country, venue, and reason for cancellation
| Date | City | Country | Venue | Reason |
|---|---|---|---|---|
| September 24, 2025 | Chicago | United States | United Center | Security concerns from the United Center related to Gaulden's feud with Lil Durk and the Black Disciples. |
| October 6, 2025 | Detroit | United States | Little Caesars Arena | Unforeseen circumstances from the Little Caesars Arena. |
| October 18, 2025 | Atlanta | United States | State Farm Arena | Due to an alleged altercation between Gaulden's camp and the Atlanta Police Department. |
