= Slime Cry =

2026 studio album by YoungBoy Never Broke Again

Studio album by YoungBoy Never Broke Again
- Released: January 16, 2026
- Recorded: November 2025–January 2026
- Genres: Hip-hop; trap
- Length: 88:03
- Labels: Never Broke Again; Motown
- Producers: 18yoman; 18yoman; 2x.samuel; 30 Roc; 3rdUp; 6Jugg; Akidwithadream; Arvid; AyeReek; Ayo Bleu; Baso; Big Cuz; Bijan Amir; BJ Bangerz; BJondatrakk; BlokkOnDa808s; BrandoBeatz; Brigtaudio; CaMadelt; Carter Bryson; Cybr; D-Rok; Decastro; Exuising; Fatboi Beats; FnZ; Gabe Lucas; Gucceo; Hajo; Horridrunitup; Hunnakid; JayMPR; JB Sauced Up; Jonah Zed; Juppybeats; Kaigoinkrazy; K10Beatz; Keanu Beats; Lewis Parker; Lucent; MacroMadelt; MalikOTB; Mally Mall; Marco Meyler; Medusa Beats; Mister J; MST; Nessuno; Percy Allen; Prod.Pil; Samabaretta; Simo Fre; Skeeo; Skolo; SpikeTrap; Tom Dellow; TrillGotJuice; Twingocrazy19; VickyFerriBeats; Wonderyo; Young Kid; YoungerNextLife; Znayshi

YoungBoy Never Broke Again chronology
| Deshawn (2025) | Slime Cry (2026) | ML2 (2026) |

Singles from Slime Cry
- 1. "Devil Go Away" Released: January 16, 2026

Slime Cry is the ninth studio album by American rapper YoungBoy Never Broke Again. It was released through Never Broke Again and Motown on January 16, 2026. The album features guest appearances from Burna Boy and Jelly Roll while its production was primarily handled by Mally Mall, D-Roc, and BlokkOnDa808s, with occasional production from FnZ, 18yoman, 30 Roc, and Lewis Parker, alongside many other producers. Parker mixed and recorded the entire record. The album serves as a follow-up to Gaulden's eighth studio album, MASA and his twenty-second mixtape, DeShawn (both 2025).

Slime Cry received favorable reviews from critics who praised the record's production and Gaulden's vulnerability while criticizing how there's not much "terrain left to map", considering Gaulden's lengthy discography. It debuted at number six on the US Billboard 200, in which it earned 70,000 album-equivalent units, of which 1,000 pure sales. The record marks Gaulden's seventeenth top-ten record on the chart, tying Drake for the second-most top-ten albums on the chart, while being the fastest to accumulate them. The album was supported by a sole lead single released alongside the album: "Devil Go Away" featuring Jelly Roll.

== Background and recording ==
Upon the release of the album on January 20, 2026, Gaulden was revealed as the cover star for Complex, while appearing in an interview with the publication. Gaulden revealed that he began to work on the record following the completion of his Make America Slime Again Tour in November 2025, while describing the album as: "it's me" and stating that he enjoyed himself creating the record.

When asked about what inspired the album's title: "Slime Cry", Gaulden stated that he didn't know and revealed that his previous record, MASA (2025) was supposed to be named "Slime Cry". He didn't, "because the music didn't feel like it. It didn't feel like that message or that type of sound". When asked about the emotional content on the album, Gaulden stated that some songs are, but not too emotional as he doesn't "really get too hurt about things no more". He continued that:

"I don't know. I'm just older now, so a lot of things that used to hurt me back then used to make me want to rap. I just don't make that type of music anymore. I don't go that deep because I ain't that hurt anymore. I think I go about things differently."

== Release and promotion ==
Gaulden first announced the release of the project on October 16, 2025, just hours before his concert at the Bridgestone Arena in Nashville, Tennessee, while on his Make America Slime Again Tour. Gaulden shared the cover art and pre-save link, announcing the release for November 28, 2025. The record failed to release on the date, with Gaulden Tweeting: "Oh you want my album I forgot".

Following this, Gaulden began to drop snippets of his new music while posting cryptic Tweets in relation to the album and his mental health. On December 11, Gaulden Tweeted "1–15??", suggesting a maximum of fifteen tracks on the record or for it to be dropped on January 15, 2026. On the same day, in a promotional video for an energy drink brand, Gaulden claimed that the album was no longer "loading".

On December 14, in a Tweet Gaulden suggested that Yeat is in control of the release of his record: "Tell @yeat1_ drop my album please", suggesting a guest apperence from the rapper. On December 19, Gaulden Tweeted: "My album will just hit your phone unexpectedly", indicating that he plans to surprise-release the record. On January 12, 2026, through his private Slime Cry page on Instagram, a new release date for the album was announced for January 16.

On January 14, it was announced that Gaulden would headline the final night of Rolling Loud's first festival in Orlando, Florida at the Camping World Stadium. On the same day, it was announced that a Make America Slime Again Tour concert documentary, directed by Nico Ballesteros is in production to be distributed by Foundation Media Partners and Gaulden's newly-founded 38 Films. On January 15, Gaulden released the official trailer for the record across his social media platforms.

During Gaulden's interview with Complex, he revealed that he plans to go on tour for the record in 2026, revealing that there will also be a European leg.

=== Singles ===
Prior to the release of the record, Gaulden began to release several promotional singles, some available on streaming, while others are exclusive to his YouTube channel. On November 15, Gaulden released his "Zero IQ Freestyle" exclusively to his label's YouTube channel before it was later uploaded to DSPs. Weeks later, on November 30, Gaulden released another YouTube exclusive single, "BossManeDLow (Top Mix)", a remix of "How I'm Livin" by BossMan Dlow and an interpolation of "24's" by T.I.. On December 16, Gaulden released "Top Cobain", a reference to the late Kurt Cobain.

On January 14, 2026, Gaulden released the song "Creep Up on Ya", which he released a snippet of on December 14 on his Instagram account, and his highly-anticipated snippet, "Baby Boo". The following day, Gaulden released the music video for "Switches"; all three of the previous releases were released exclusively to his YouTube channel.

Upon the release of the album, despite YouTube's withdrawal from the Billboard charts, Gaulden released the official music videos for the tracks "For You" and "Resume".

== Critical reception ==
Professional ratings
Review scores
| Source | Rating |
|---|---|
| AllMusic | 2.5/5 stars |
| Ratings Game Music | 64% |

AllMusic's TiVo Staff wrote that the record "touches on familiar themes such as heartbreak, resilience, and loyalty to friends and family" and that it "follows in the same path as the prolific rapper's other lengthy releases". Writing for HotNewHipHop, Tallie Spencer wrote that, "sonically, the album leans into the emotionally charged, high-intensity lane that has fueled YoungBoy’s most impactful releases", continuing that Gaulden "[balances] raw confession with aggressive energy".

Ratings Game Music's Quincy wrote that "there are moments where he goes ballistic over bouncy, menacing Louisiana beats, moments where vulnerability slips through the cracks" while other moments include Gaulden "[leaning] into his lovey-dovey bag". He noted that "lyrically, it’s familiar territory too: violence, love, feeling misunderstood, and making money", before writing that where "Slime Cry separates itself is in its sheer scale and tone". Quincy concluded that Gaulden's "raw, chaotic charm keeps you listening longer than you probably should, even when the album feels exhausting".

== Commercial performance ==
In the United States, Slime Cry debuted at number six on the US Billboard 200, earning 70,000 album-equivalent units [including 1,000 pure sales]. The album also accumulated a total of 72.6 million on-demand official streams of the album's songs. The album marked Gaulden's seventeenth top-ten album on the chart, tying Drake for the second-most top-ten albums on the chart. Gaulden is also the artist with the fastest accumulation of top-ten albums on the chart. In its second week, the record fell a spot to number seven, moving 41,000 album-equivalent units, down 42%.

== Track listing ==
Slime Cry track listing
| No. | Title | Writer(s) | Producer(s) | Length |
|---|---|---|---|---|
| 1. | "Love Speaks" | Kentrell Gaulden | | 0:04 |
| 2. | "Mask and Gloves" | Gaulden; Parker Hill; Marco Meyler | 1parkerhill; Marco Meyler | 2:46 |
| 3. | "Another Episode" | Gaulden; Justin Wolfson | Lucent | 2:46 |
| 4. | "Anti-Social" | Gaulden; Jamal Rashid; Jeremy Bradley; Leonardo Sternieri; Simone Di Franco | Mally Mall; JB Sauced Up; Gucceo; Simo Fre | 3:18 |
| 5. | "Headtap" | Gaulden; LaBrandon Robertson; Alanza Sibley; Cedric McClain Jr. | BrandoBeatz; Red On Da Track; Fatboi Beats | 2:00 |
| 6. | "Badder than Yours" | Gaulden; BJ Bangerz; CaMadeIt | BJ Bangerz; CaMadeIt | 2:25 |
| 7. | "Me and You" | Gaulden; Vyacheslavovich Kirill; Arvid Kettelhut | Exuising; Arvid | 2:30 |
| 8. | "My Life I Apologize" | Gaulden; Rashid; Sternieri; Di Franco; Percy Allen; Mick Steinbach | Mally Mall; Gucceo; Simo Fre; Percy Allen; MST; Znayshi | 2:52 |
| 9. | "Perfecto" | Gaulden; Daniel Lebrun; Brandon Russel; Ba Ardo Abdulsadikh; Myeong Geun Song | D-Rok; BJondatrakk; MacroMadeIt; Skolo | 2:46 |
| 10. | "Ballin" | Gaulden; Kyler Mathis | K10Beatz | 3:11 |
| 11. | "Bang Out" | Gaulden; Seth Love | Skeeo | 3:47 |
| 12. | "Don't Break" | Gaulden; Leburn; Russel | D-Rok; BJondatrakk | 3:01 |
| 13. | "Good Dope" | Gaulden; Leburn; Francesco Basato; Giancarlo di Gennaro | D-Rok; Baso; Young Kid | 2:30 |
| 14. | "Teary Eyes" (with Burna Boy) | Gaulden; Damini Ogulu; Michael Mulé; Isaac De Boni; Vincent Goodyer; Bijan Amirkhani; Keanu Torres | FnZ; 18yoman; Bijan Amir; Keanu Beats | 2:45 |
| 15. | "For You" | Gaulden; Devontae Loper; Teun Vroomen; Carter Bryson; Jonah Zed; Michael Price | BlokkOnDa808s; 3rdup; Carter Bryson; Jonah Zed; YoungerNextLife | 2:08 |
| 16. | "Bruce Wayne" | Gaulden; Rashid; Nikita Jakovcenko; Jasper Cortez; Darius Poviliūnas | Mally Mall; Hunnakid; Juppybeats; Wonderyo | 2:56 |
| 17. | "FWYT" | Gaulden; Loper; Kristjan Helm | BlokkOnDa808s; Prod.Pil; Twingocrazy19 | 2:44 |
| 18. | "Role Model" | Gaulden; Leburn; Julio Espana; Tom Dellow | D-Rok; Hajo; Tom Dellow; 2x.samuel | 2:52 |
| 19. | "Baby Boo" | Gaulden; Mathis; Shubhjit Balam; Gene Wagenaar | K10Beatz; AyeReek; Medusa Beats | 2:11 |
| 20. | "Vendetta" | Gaulden; Samuel Gloade; JaVion Johnson; Jason Brown | 30 Roc; 6Jugg; Big Cuz | 3:42 |
| 21. | "Horsepower" | Gaulden; Rashid; Allen; Steinbach | Mally Mall; Percy Allen; MST; Znayshi | 2:13 |
| 22. | "My Grave" | Gaulden; Malik Bynoe-Fisher; Shubhjit Balam; Alex Bottero | MalikOTB; Horridrunitup; SspikeTrap | 3:31 |
| 23. | "My Brothers" | Gaulden; Rashid; Brig Tangry; Gabriel Decastro; Hill | Mally Mall; Akidwithadream; Brigtaudio; Decastro; 1parkerhill | 3:17 |
| 24. | "I Want" | Gaulden; Loper; Braylen Rembert; Pevere Nicolò | BlokkOnDa808s; Ayo Bleu; Samabaretta; Nessuno | 3:00 |
| 25. | "Love Hate" | Gaulden; Robertson; Sibley | BrandoBeatz; Red On Da Track | 3:15 |
| 26. | "Resume" | Gaulden; Leburn; Russel; Lewis Parker; Hugo Menéndez | D-Rok; BJondatrakk; Lewis Parker; Cybr | 3:01 |
| 27. | "Steal the Show" | Gaulden; Loper; Mathis; Tangry; Jalen Jones | BlokkOnDa808s; K10Beatz; Brigtaudio; JayMPR | 2:17 |
| 28. | "Factor" | Gaulden; Victor Ferreira; Jamal Naïtzigui | VickyFerriBeats; Mister J | 3:36 |
| 29. | "Leaving Me" | Gaulden; Mathis | K10Beatz | 2:25 |
| 30. | "Devil Go Away" (with Jelly Roll) | Gaulden; Jason DeFord; Luka Berman; Kai Hasegawa; Antonio Ramos | Gabe Lucas; Kaigoinkrazy; TrillGotJuice | 2:14 |
| Total length: | | | | 88:03 |

Sample credits

- "Anti-Social" contains samples of "Can You Stand the Rain", written by James Harris III and Terry Lewis, as performed by New Edition.
- "Me and You" contains samples of "Hostage", written by Billie Eilish O'Connell and Finneas O'Connell, as performed by Billie Eilish.

== Personnel ==
Credits adapted from Tidal.

Musicians

- YoungBoy Never Broke Again – vocals (all tracks)
- Burna Boy – vocals (14)
- Jelly Roll – vocals (30)

Technical

- DJ Ryno – mastering (all tracks)
- BlokkOnDa808s – mixing, recording (all tracks)

== Charts ==
Chart performance for Slime Cry
| Chart (2026) | Peak position |
|---|---|
| Nigerian Albums (TurnTable) | 33 |
| US Billboard 200 | 6 |
| US Top R&B/Hip-Hop Albums (Billboard) | 2 |

== Release history ==
Release dates and formats for Slime Cry
| Region | Date | Label(s) | Format(s) | Edition(s) | Ref. |
|---|---|---|---|---|---|
| Various | January 16, 2026 | Never Broke Again; Motown | Digital download; streaming | Standard | |

== See also ==
- 2026 in hip-hop
