= Bruce Wayne (YoungBoy Never Broke Again song) =

2026 song by YoungBoy Never Broke Again

Song by YoungBoy Never Broke Again

from the album Slime Cry
- Released: January 16, 2026
- Length: 2:56
- Label: Never Broke Again; Motown
- Songwriters: Kentrell Gaulden; Jamal Rashid; Nikita Jakovcenko; Jasper Cortez; Darius Poviliūnas
- Producers: Mally Mall; Hunnakid; Juppybeats; Wonderyo

Audio video
- "Bruce Wayne" on YouTube

"Bruce Wayne" is a song by American rapper YoungBoy Never Broke Again from his ninth studio album, Slime Cry (2026). Produced by Mally Mall, Hunnakid, Juppybeats, and Wonderyo, it peaked at number 57 on the Billboard Hot 100. The song serves as the sixteenth track to Slime Cry is inspired by Bruce Wayne the alias of the fictional superhero, Batman.

== Background ==
Gaulden first previewed the song on January 3, 2026, in his "Slime Cry Utah Vlog", released on the Never Broke Again label channel.

== Composition ==
In the song, Gaulden compares himself to Batman, "presenting himself as a powerful yet guarded figure juggling wealth, street authority, inner conflict, and complicated relationships". The song's production "carries dramatic tension" while "YoungBoy balances subdued rapping with edgy, emotional singing", which gives "the record real texture".

== Critical reception ==
Ratings Game Music's Quincy rated the song as the second best track on Slime Cry, writing that it "stands out as one of the project’s more creative moments".

== Personnel ==
Credits adapted from Tidal.

Musicians

- Kentrell DeSean Gaulden – lead artist, songwriter, composer
- Mally Mall – production, composer, songwriter
- Hunnakid – production, composer, songwriter
- Juppybeats – production, composer, songwriter
- Wonderyo – production, composer, songwriter

Technical

- DJ Ryno – mastering
- BlokkOnDa808s – mixing, recording

== Charts ==
Chart performance for "Bruce Wayne"
Chart (2026)	Peak position
US Billboard Hot 100	57
US Hot R&B/Hip-Hop Songs (Billboard)	16
