= Publicity Stunt (song) =

2022 single by Gucci Mane

Single by Gucci Mane

from the album So Icy Gang: The ReUp
- Released: March 4, 2022
- Length: 3:17
- Label: Atlantic; 1017
- Songwriters: Radric Davis; Brytavious Chambers
- Producer: Tay Keith

Gucci Mane singles chronology
"Rumors" (2022)	"Publicity Stunt" (2022)	"Blood All on It" (2022)

Music video
- "Publicity Stunt" on YouTube

"Publicity Stunt" is a song by American rapper Gucci Mane. It was released as the second single from his 2022 deluxe compilation album So Icy Gang: The ReUp, through Atlantic and 1017 Records on March 4, 2022. Mane wrote the song with producer Tay Keith. It is a response to YoungBoy Never Broke Again's single, "I Hate YoungBoy", which was released more than a week before, in which YoungBoy rapped a line about not having respect for Mane anymore because of Mane reportedly supporting people that YoungBoy is against.

== Composition and lyrics ==
Mane uses "Publicity Stunt" as a response to fellow American rapper and previous collaborator, YoungBoy Never Broke Again's 2022 single, "I Hate YoungBoy". YoungBoy took a shot at Mane on his song with the line: "Used to fuck with Gucci 'til I seen he like them pussy niggas". In a possible response to what YoungBoy said, Mane starts the song off with the chorus, in which he calls out the rapper for dissing him for publicity: "He's tryna pull a publicity stunt / These rappers be pussy, they bleed once a month / Don't speak on my name, don't get put in a blunt / You can diss all you want, still won't get a response". In the first verse, Mane questions why YoungBoy did what he did, in which he raps: "Why you diss me for publicity, nigga? (Huh?) / Is you in the streets or an industry nigga? (Well, damn) / Is you my fan or my enemy, nigga?". Continuing the verse, Mane also compares himself and his weaponry to Russian president, Vladimir Putin, and former U.S. presidents, Barack Obama and Donald Trump: "Ain't no disputin', I kill like I'm Putin / Got a truck full of shooters, I move like I'm Trump / Soldiers stand guard for me like I'm Obama". At the end of the song, Mane repeatedly raps the line: "I thought you felt like Gucci Mane in 2006", interpolating a line that YoungBoy rapped on the chorus of his single, "Make No Sense", from his fourteenth mixtape, AI YoungBoy 2 (2019): "I feel like I'm Gucci Mane in 2006".

== Music video ==
The official music video for "Publicity Stunt", directed by Omar the Director, premiered alongside the song on March 4, 2022. It begins with Mane, who sports many jewelry pieces, reading a newspaper about the Russo-Ukrainian War, which was an ongoing conflict at the time of the song's release. Throughout the video, he waters his lawn, wanders around his pool, receives many gifts from people, and boasts his yellow racecar while pumping gas in it. It notably replaced "I Hate YoungBoy" at the number-one position on YouTube's trending videos a few days after its release.

== Personnel ==
- Gucci Mane – vocals, songwriting
- Tay Keith – production, songwriting
- Eddie "eMIX" Hernandez – mixing
- Amani "A $" Hernandez – mixing assistance
- Colin Leonard – mastering

== Charts ==
Chart performance for "Publicity Stunt"
Chart (2022)	Peak position
US Billboard Hot 100	72
US Hot R&B/Hip-Hop Songs (Billboard)	22
