= Sincerely, Kentrell =

Studio album by YoungBoy Never Broke Again
- Released: September 24, 2021
- Genre: Hip hop
- Length: 57:14
- Label: Never Broke Again; Atlantic
- Producer: 17ondatrack; Ambezza; Catch 22; Cheese; DeskHop; DJ Trebble; DMAC; DRoc; Dubba-Aa; Dzimi; Einer Bankz; Haze; Hurt; Hzrd; Its2ezzy; Jai Beats; J Diesel; Leor; The Lottery; Louie Bandz; Manso; Menace; Mike Laury; Mikewavvs; Mike Will Made It; Myles Harris; Palaze; Ravis; Smash David; Smokescreen; SMPLGTWY; Sspiketrap; Stunner Samples; TayTayMadeIt; TNTXD; Uncle Cameron; Vadebeatz; WallisLane; WassamWop; Yosh; Zailor; Zuus; • JoshFishScale

YoungBoy Never Broke Again chronology
Nobody Safe (2020)	Sincerely, Kentrell (2021)	From the Bayou (2021)

Singles from Sincerely, Kentrell
- 1. "Toxic Punk" Released: February 4, 2021; 2. "White Teeth" Released: May 14, 2021; 3. "Nevada" Released: July 7, 2021; 4. "Life Support" Released: September 10, 2021; 5. "On My Side" Released: September 17, 2021

Sincerely, Kentrell is the third studio album by American rapper YoungBoy Never Broke Again. It was released through Never Broke Again and Atlantic Records on September 24, 2021. Unlike Gaulden's previous projects, the album notably contains no guest appearances, which was a key part of the album's rollout. The album's production was handled by a range of accomplished producers including Einer Bankz, Mike Will Made It, Smash David, and Jason "Cheese" Goldberg—who also mixed and mastered the entire record. The album follows Gaulden's second full-length studio album, Top (2020), as well as Until I Return (2020), his fifteenth solo mixtape. A deluxe edition, named Sincerely, Kentrell > (pronounced "better"), was released four days later on September 28, 2021, and contains two additional songs. The deluxe edition's name is an ode to the "YB Better" trend at the time of the album's release.

Sincerely, Kentrell received generally positive reviews from critics who highlighted the album's production and lyrical content. It debuted at number one on the US Billboard 200 chart, in which it earned 137,000 album-equivalent units, of which 8,000 were pure album sales. Eleven of the twenty-three tracks from the album debuted on the Billboard Hot 100. Sincerely, Kentrell also became the third project—behind Tupac Shakur's Me Against the World (1995) and Lil Wayne's I Am Not a Human Being (2010)—by an imprisoned artist to top the charts and is the first rap album in the 2020s decade to top the charts with no features. The album was supported by five singles: "Toxic Punk", "White Teeth", "Nevada", "Life Support" and "On My Side".

== Release and promotion ==
Sincerely, Kentrell was first teased by the Never Broke Again label on December 16, 2020, through the label's official Instagram. The teaser stated that the album would be YoungBoy's biggest and would be released on May 7, 2021. However, on March 22, 2021, Gaulden was arrested by federal agents in Los Angeles, stemming from his September 2020 Baton Rouge arrest. Attempting to evade the LAPD, Gaulden ditched his vehicle, which the LAPD searched and found a firearm inside. The FBI additionally charged Gaulden with firearm possession—of which he was found not guilty in July 2022. On March 25, media personality Wendy Williams commented on YoungBoy's arrest, noting that, "he’s got to go to jail". On April 19, 2021, Gaulden sent an email to his team while incarcerated, addressing his arrest, Williams, and the album:

i can leave my kids millions of dollars to divide but can't give them the time they truly deserve nobody understand me they never did shit some times i don't understand myself but that's fine because im okay i ain't looking for you to feel sorry I just ask for one thing- For you to let me suffer in peace tell MS. WENDY WILLIAM I say she got a good soul and she's a beautiful women I can see that threw all the bad comments thrown at her tell her count her blessings (STAY IN GOOD SPIRIT) Sincerely Kentrell

While incarcerated, the Never Broke Again label page previewed "Still Waiting", a track recorded over a jail phone. On September 10, YoungBoy shared the album's official artwork, alongside announcing its release date of September 24. Weeks prior to the release of the album, billboards begun to appear, stating, "no features necessary", suggesting that the album would include no features, alongside "YB Better" billboards, referring to the popular trend on social media, indicating that YoungBoy is the best rapper. On September 23, YoungBoy released the album's official tracklist, confirming it would have zero features. On the night of the album's release, YoungBoy shared a poem titled, "Deep in Me".

Upon the album's release, YoungBoy's management released the pre-recorded music video of the album's thirteenth cut, "Break or Make Me". Following the release of the album, on September 26, the album's deluxe edition was released, containing an additional two bonus tracks, including the previously teased "Still Waiting". On September 29, the official, pre-recorded, music video of the album's eighteenth cut, "Kickstand", was released.

=== Singles ===
The album's lead single "Toxic Punk" was released on February 4, 2021. The song was produced by Cheese, DJ Trebble, Dmac, and TNTXD. It debuted at number 99 on the Billboard Hot 100. The album's second single, "White Teeth" was released on May 14, 2021. The song was produced by TayTayMadeIt and peaked at number 78 on the Billboard Hot 100. After gaining traction online for months due to the track being previously leaked, "Nevada" was released as the album's third single on July 7, 2021. The track was produced by TnTXD and Vadebeatz. It peaked at number 58 on the Billboard Hot 100. The album's fourth single, "Life Support", was released on September 10, 2021, alongside the album's tracklist. It was produced by Cheese, Smash David, Ravis, Stunner Samples, and SMPLGTWY. The track peaked at number 48 on the Billboard Hot 100. "On My Side" was released on September 17, 2021, as the album's fifth and final single. The track was produced by Cheese, Leor Shevah, and Haze. It peaked at number 37 on the Billboard Hot 100.

== Critical reception ==
Professional ratings
Review scores
Source	Rating
AllMusic	4/5 stars
HipHopDX	3.7/5
Pitchfork	7.1/10
Rolling Stone	3.5/5 stars

Sincerely, Kentrell received generally positive reviews from music critics. David Aaron Brake from HipHopDX states that "like much of YoungBoy’s albums Sincerely, Kentrell is less a polished product and more the stream-of-consciousness thoughts of YoungBoy at the moment." He also cites that "YoungBoy raps through a thick Louisiana drawl, the battle between betrayal and loyalty takes center stage." He concludes his review by stating "Sincerely, Kentrell is YoungBoy at his most vulnerable and vengeful, worn down by his own paranoia, some justified and some fabricated." Alphonse Pierre from Pitchfork states that "He has blurred the lines between his rap persona and lived reality, which makes it an uncomfortable, but sometimes remarkable listen." He further mentions that "Though the album’s quality may vary from song to song, it all adds up to a startling glimpse of a larger-than-life figure whose tragic shadow extends over everything he touches." Concluding his review, he explains that "While it carries the same flaws as his previous work, the latest album from the Baton Rouge rapper provides a clear portrait of a tragic figure who often blurs the lines between fact and fiction."

Will Dukes from Rolling Stone writes that "his style, a whimsical mix of Young Thug and fellow New Orleanian Little Wayne is heavy on melody, which he fuses with some rough-and-tumble grit." He further mentions that "if these are the proverbial scars YoungBoy Never Broke Again ’s chosen to reveal to us, they’re from battles, thankfully, he’s already won." Concluding his review, he writes that "the Baton Rouge, Louisiana-based rapper's third album is full of conviction and bruised passion."

== Commercial performance ==
Sincerely, Kentrell debuted at number one on the US Billboard 200 chart, earning 137,000 album-equivalent units (including 10,000 in pure sales) in its first week, according to MRC Data. This became YoungBoy's fourth US number one debut on the chart. The album also accumulated a total of 186.29 million on-demand streams of the album's 23 tracks. In addition, YoungBoy joined Tupac and Lil Wayne as the third rapper to receive a number one album while incarcerated. In its second week, the album dropped to number four, earning 71,000 units.

== Track listing ==
Sincerely, Kentrell track listing
No.	Title	Writer(s)	Producer(s)	Length
1.	"Bad Morning"	Kentrell Gaulden; Aaron Lockhart; Michael Laury; William Golden Mosley Jr.	Dubba-Aa; The Lottery; Laury	3:49
2.	"Hold Me Down"	Gaulden; Josh Veysey; Jason Goldberg; Aaron Klus; Matthew McQueen	Catch 22; Cheese; Yosh; Smokescreen	2:58
3.	"On My Side"	Gaulden; Goldberg; Ethan Hayes; Leor Shevah	Cheese; Haze; Leor	2:28
4.	"Smoke Strong"	Gaulden; Goldberg; Vilyam Vardumyan; Aaron Gilfenbain; Alex Bottero	Hurt; Hzrd; Sspiketrap	2:58
5.	"50 Shots"	Gaulden; Tavian Carter	TayTayMadeIt	2:41
6.	"No Where"	Gaulden; Goldberg; Thomas Horton; David McDowell; Spencer Harris	Cheese; DMAC; Einer Bankz; TNTXD	2:37
7.	"Sincerely"	Gaulden; Goldberg; McDowell; Cameron Hubler; Jaidyn Hullum	Cheese; DMAC; Jai Beats; Uncle Cameron	2:54
8.	"I Can't Take It Back"	Gaulden; Goldberg; Hayes; Thomas Horton; Brian Mithcell	Cheese; Haze; TNTXD; Zuus	2:57
9.	"Rich Shit"	Gaulden; Goldberg; Morgan James Taylor; Mathias Daniel Liyew	Cheese; Zailor; Ambezza	2:35
10.	"Toxic Punk"	Gaulden; Goldberg; Horton; McDowell; Noah David	Cheese; DMAC; TNTXD; DJ Trebble	2:03
11.	"My Killa"	Gaulden; Goldberg; Samuel Jimenez; Ian Wells	Cheese; Smash David; DeskHop	2:24
12.	"Life Support"	Gaulden; Goldberg; Jimenez; Travis Tatad; Michael Samuels Jr.	Smash David; Ravis; Stunner Samples; SMPLGTWY	3:53
13.	"Break or Make Me"	Gaulden; Goldberg; Nikola Pejovic; Christoffer Buchardt Marcussen	Cheese; Palaze; Dzimi	3:12
14.	"Forgiato"	Gaulden; Lockhart; Mosley; Laury	Dubba-Aa; The Lottery; Laury	3:08
15.	"Baddest Thing"	Gaulden; Myles Harris; Adnan Khan; Michael Len Williams II	Menace; Mike Will Made It; Harris	2:15
16.	"Nevada"	Gaulden; Horton; David Boonpetch	TNTXD; Vadebeatz	2:35
17.	"Level I Want to Reach"	Gaulden; Daniel Lebrun; Johnfrancis Mbata; Sven Steenbergen	DRoc; 17ondatrack; Its2ezzy	2:09
18.	"Kickstand"	Gaulden; Horton; Jonathan Gaboff	J Diesel; TNTXD	1:52
19.	"All I Need"	Gaulden; Don'Taye Shephard	WassamWop	2:54
20.	"White Teeth"	Gaulden; Carter; Goldberg	TayTayMadeIt	2:54
21.	"Panoramic"	Gaulden; Goldberg; Nima Jahanbin; Paimon Jahanbin; Tomas Martinez; Michael James Washington Jr.	Cheese; Mikewavvs; Manso; WallisLane	2:06
Total length:				57:14

Deluxe edition bonus tracks
No.	Title	Writer(s)	Producer(s)	Length
1.	"Footstep"	Gaulden; Lockhart; Dennis Neal Jr.	Dubba-Aa; Louie Bandz	2:21
2.	"Still Waiting"	Gaulden; Carter	TayTayMadeIt	3:09
Total length:				62:44

== Personnel ==
Credits adapted from Tidal.

Musicians

- YoungBoy Never Broke Again – vocals (all tracks)
- Vadebeatz – guitar, percussion, piano (16)

Technical

- Jason "Cheese" Goldberg – mastering (1–23), mixing (1–15, 20–23), recording (2–13, 15, 20–23), assistant recording (1, 17–19)
- Spencer Dennis – recording (14)
- Mark Dorflinger – recording (16–19), mixing (17–19)

== Charts ==
=== Weekly charts ===
Weekly chart performance for Sincerely, Kentrell
Chart (2021)	Peak position
Australian Albums (ARIA)	69
Belgian Albums (Ultratop Flanders)	154
Canadian Albums (Billboard)	8
Dutch Albums (Album Top 100)	46
Irish Albums (IRMA)	89
Norwegian Albums (VG-lista)	39
UK Albums (OCC)	47
UK R&B Albums (OCC)	35
US Billboard 200	1
US Top R&B/Hip-Hop Albums (Billboard)	1

=== Year-end charts ===
2021 year-end chart performance for Sincerely, Kentrell
Chart (2021)	Position
US Billboard 200	124
US Top R&B/Hip-Hop Albums (Billboard)	48

2022 year-end chart performance for Sincerely, Kentrell
Chart (2022)	Position
US Billboard 200	99
US Top R&B/Hip-Hop Albums (Billboard)	54

== Certifications ==
Certifications for Sincerely, Kentrell
Region	Certification	Certified units/sales
United States (RIAA)	Platinum	1,000,000^{‡}
^{‡} Sales+streaming figures based on certification alone.

== Release history ==
Release dates and formats for Sincerely, Kentrell
Region	Date	Label(s)	Format(s)	Edition(s)	Ref.
Various	September 24, 2021	Never Broke Again; Atlantic	Digital download; streaming	Standard	
Various	September 26, 2021	Never Broke Again; Atlantic	Digital download; streaming	Deluxe	
United States	October 8, 2021	Never Broke Again; Atlantic	CD	Deluxe	
Canada	October 15, 2021	Never Broke Again; Atlantic	CD	Deluxe	
Europe	October 15, 2021	Never Broke Again; Atlantic	CD	Deluxe	
United States	July 22, 2022	Never Broke Again; Atlantic	LP	Deluxe	
Canada	July 22, 2022	Never Broke Again; Atlantic	LP	Deluxe	

== See also ==
- 2021 in hip hop music
- List of Billboard 200 number-one albums of 2021
