= Valuable Pain =

2018 single by YoungBoy Never Broke Again

Single by YoungBoy Never Broke Again

from the album Realer
- Released: December 10, 2018
- Length: 2:49
- Label: Never Broke Again; Atlantic
- Songwriters: Kentrell Gaulden; Kendrell Mattox; CashFlowBeatz
- Producers: DrellOnTheTrack; CashFlowBeatz

YoungBoy Never Broke Again singles chronology
"Cappin" (2018)	"Valuable Pain" (2018)	"Southern Smoke" (2018)

Music video
- "Valuable Pain" on YouTube

"Valuable Pain" is a song by American rapper YoungBoy Never Broke Again, released on December 10, 2018 as the lead single from his mixtape Realer (2018). It was produced by DrellOnTheTrack and CashFlowBeatz.

== Composition ==
In the song, NBA YoungBoy details the troubles he has had in his relationship, over "soulful", piano-driven production.

== Critical reception ==
Aron A. of HotNewHipHop gave the song a "VERY HOTTTTT" rating and wrote, "On 'Valuable Pain,' Youngboy perfectly balances his melodies and his bars. It's a promising single from Youngboy."

== Charts ==
Chart (2019)	Peak position
US Billboard Hot 100	87
US Hot R&B/Hip-Hop Songs (Billboard)	40

== Certifications ==
Region	Certification	Certified units/sales
United States (RIAA)	3× Platinum	3,000,000^{‡}
^{‡} Sales+streaming figures based on certification alone.
