= Realer (mixtape) =

Mixtape by YoungBoy Never Broke Again
- Released: December 20, 2018
- Length: 33:23
- Label: Never Broke Again; APG; Atlantic
- Producer: Bans; Beatmonster Marc; Ben Billions; Brett Bailey; CashFlowBeatz; David Mescon; DJ Swift; DrellOnTheTrack; Dubba-AA; Durdy Costello; Eliot Bohr; India Got Them Beats; MarcussMuzik; Mook On The Beats; NeilOnDaTrack; PlayboyXO; Vintage Rippah

YoungBoy Never Broke Again chronology
4Respect 4Freedom 4Loyalty 4WhatImportant (2018)	Realer (2018)	AI YoungBoy 2 (2019)

Singles from Realer
- 1. "Valuable Pain" Released: December 10, 2018

Realer is the eleventh solo mixtape by American rapper YoungBoy Never Broke Again, released on December 20, 2018, through Never Broke Again, Artist Partner Group, and Atlantic Records. It features guest appearances from Lil Baby and Plies, alongside production from Ben Billions, DJ Swift, DrellOnTheTrack, Dubba-AA, Eliot Bohr, PlayboyXO, Vintage Rippah, and several other producers. The mixtape serves as a follow-up to Gaulden's compilation album, 4Respect 4Freedom 4Loyalty 4WhatImportant, released in September of the same year. It also marks Gaulden's fifth release of the year.

== Background and release ==
On October 28, 2018, Gaulden teased the release of 38 Baby 2 (2020), the sequel of his breakthrough mixtape, 38 Baby, by sharing the mixtape's initial artwork on his Instagram. On October 30, 2018, Gaulden released the non-album single, "Not Wrong Now". On November 3, Gaulden released the song "Blasian", which failed to appear on the mixtape. On November 12, Gaulden released the official music video for the mixtape's eleventh cut, "Dope Lamp", exclusively to his YouTube channel. This was followed by the release of the non-album single, "Hypnotized" on November 15. On December 10, Gaulden officially released the mixtape's lead single, "Valuable Pain", alongside announcing the release of the project. Upon the release of the mixtape, Gaulden released the official music video for the album's outro, "I Came Thru".

== Critical reception ==
Professional ratings
Review scores
Source	Rating
AllMusic	3/5 stars

Realer received mixed reviews from music critics. Writing for AllMusic, Paul Simpson wrote that the mixtape "showcases YoungBoy's uncompromising street narratives as well as his melodic sensibility".

== Commercial performance ==
Realer debuted at number fifteen on the US Billboard 200 chart, earning 42,000 album-equivalent units (including 3,000 pure album sales) in its first week. The album also accumulated a total of 55.97 million on-demand streams of the album's 12 tracks.

== Track listing ==
Realer track listing
No.	Title	Writer(s)	Producer(s)	Length
1.	"Survivor"	Kentrell Gaulden; India Williams	India Got Them Beats	3:00
2.	"Slime Belief"	Gaulden; Marcus Marsh; Eliot Bohr	Beatmonster Marc; Eliot Bohr	3:13
3.	"Play Wit Us"	Gaulden; Eliot Guillory II	Vintage Rippah	3:11
4.	"Big Talk"	Gaulden; Guillory II	Vintage Rippah	2:46
5.	"Thug N***a Life"	Gaulden; Justin Allison	Durdy Costello	1:52
6.	"Valuable Pain"	Gaulden; CashFlowBeatz; Kendrell Mattox	CashFlowBeatz; DrellOnTheTrack	2:49
7.	"My Mama Say"	Gaulden; Jarrian Thompson	PlayboyXO	2:16
8.	"38 Heights"	Gaulden; Benjamin Diehl; Brett Bailey; David Mescon	Ben Billions; Brett Bailey; David Mescon	2:41
9.	"Beam Effect"	Gaulden; Aaron Lockhart Jr.; Damion Williams	DJ Swift; Dubba-AA	2:15
10.	"Cross Me" (featuring Lil Baby and Plies)	Gaulden; Dominique Jones; Algernod Washington; Leonardo Mateus; Brayon Nelson	Bans; Mook On The Beats	3:54
11.	"Dope Lamp"	Gaulden; Neil Harrison	NeilOnDaTrack	2:45
12.	"I Came Thru"	Gaulden; Marcus Gotch, Jr.	MarcussMuzik	2:41
Total length:				33:23

== Charts ==
Weekly chart performance for Realer
Chart (2019)	Peak position
Dutch Albums (Album Top 100)	168
US Billboard 200	15
US Top R&B/Hip-Hop Albums (Billboard)	11

== Certifications ==
Region	Certification	Certified units/sales
United States (RIAA)	Platinum	1,000,000^{‡}
^{‡} Sales+streaming figures based on certification alone.

== See also ==
- 2018 in hip hop music
