= I Hate YoungBoy =

2022 single by YoungBoy Never Broke Again

Single by YoungBoy Never Broke Again

from the album The Last Slimeto
- Released: February 22, 2022
- Genre: Gangsta rap; trap
- Length: 4:21
- Label: Atlantic; Never Broke Again
- Songwriters: Kentrell Gaulden; Jason Goldberg
- Producers: Cheese; Horrid; K10; Rell

YoungBoy Never Broke Again singles chronology
"Opposite" (2022)	"I Hate YoungBoy" (2022)	"Neighborhood Superstar" (2022)

Music video
- "I Hate YoungBoy" on YouTube

"I Hate YoungBoy" is a diss track by American rapper YoungBoy Never Broke Again. It was released as a single through Atlantic Records and Never Broke Again on February 22, 2022. Produced by Cheese, Horrid, K10, and Rell, Cheese wrote the song with YoungBoy and also mixed and mastered the song. The song gained attention for YoungBoy taking shots at Lil Durk alongside Durk's fiancée, India Royale, and his father, and people who have connections to the rapper or those YoungBoy thinks that have betrayed him.

== Composition and lyrics ==
Over a fast-paced instrumental, YoungBoy uses "I Hate YoungBoy" as a diss track towards Lil Durk, which is a response to Durk's single, "Ahhh Ha", from his seventh studio album, 7220, which was released on the same day as YoungBoy's song, with only a few hours' difference between the two songs. Durk might have possibly came after YoungBoy's ex-girlfriend, Jania Meshell, on "Ahhh Ha". He also disses some of the people and organizations that are associated with Durk or that he feels have gone against him. He disses Durk's fiancée, India Royale ("He called me a bitch, that's India, that be your ho"), rapper and previous collaborator Gucci Mane ("Used to fuck with Gucci 'til I seen he like them pussy niggas"). YoungBoy also calls Durk out for taking shots at him and takes a shot at the death of Durk's Only the Family signee, fellow rapper King Von ("Pussy nigga dissin' me, mad about his dead homie"), and references his Never Broke Again signee, fellow rapper and previous collaborator Quando Rondo, who was reportedly involved in the murder of Durk's artist. He sends more subliminal jabs at rappers OTF Nunu (Durk's cousin) and previous collaborators Boosie Badazz and Lil Baby ("Baby with 'em, 4PF, four poles firing"), and music streaming service Apple Music, among others. A possible reason for dissing Mane was because Durk was featured on his single, "Rumors", which was released in January 2022.

== Responses ==
Boosie Badazz reacted to Youngboy taking shots at him through an Instagram story, in which he said that it "pissed [him] off though" and YoungBoy "hurt [his] feelings". On March 4, 2022, Mane released a single titled "Publicity Stunt" to respond to YoungBoy taking shots at him on "I Hate YoungBoy", in which he used the title of the song to describe what YoungBoy was dissing him for. On the song, YoungBoy also boasts about the expensive things that he owns, stating that he prefers a "long vacation" and needs "guitars to sing and play when I'm down".

== Charts ==
Chart performance for "I Hate YoungBoy"
Chart (2022)	Peak position
US Billboard Hot 100	79
US Hot R&B/Hip-Hop Songs (Billboard)	26

== Certifications ==
Region	Certification	Certified units/sales
United States (RIAA)	Platinum	1,000,000^{‡}
^{‡} Sales+streaming figures based on certification alone.
