= Toxic Punk =

Single by YoungBoy Never Broke Again

Single by YoungBoy Never Broke Again

from the album Sincerely, Kentrell
- Released: February 4, 2021
- Genre: Trap
- Length: 2:03
- Label: Never Broke Again; Atlantic
- Songwriters: Kentrell Gaulden; Jason Goldberg; Noah David; Thomas Horton; David McDowell
- Producers: Cheese; DJ Trebble; Dmac; TNTXD

YoungBoy Never Broke Again singles chronology
"It Ain't Over" (2020)	"Toxic Punk" (2021)	"I Ain't Scared" (2021)

Alternate cover
- Alternate cover

"Toxic Punk" is a song by American rapper YoungBoy Never Broke Again, released on February 4, 2021 as the lead single from his third studio album Sincerely, Kentrell (2021). It was produced by Cheese, DJ Trebble, Dmac and TnTXD. The title of the song, as well as the alternate cover art of the single, is a reference to the video game Cyberpunk 2077.

== Composition ==
The song features a guitar-driven trap instrumental and a pop rock-inspired melody. NBA YoungBoy sing-raps about the effects that drugs, as well as a failed relationship, have had on his life. He reflects on all the positive things and events around him, but expresses that they do not mean much when he is missing his loved one.

== Charts ==
Chart (2021)	Peak position
US Billboard Hot 100	99
US Hot R&B/Hip-Hop Songs (Billboard)	49

== Certifications ==
Region	Certification	Certified units/sales
United States (RIAA)	Gold	500,000^{‡}
^{‡} Sales+streaming figures based on certification alone.
