= White Teeth (song) =

Single by YoungBoy Never Broke Again

Single by YoungBoy Never Broke Again

from the album Sincerely, Kentrell
- Released: May 14, 2021
- Length: 2:54
- Label: Never Broke Again; Atlantic
- Songwriter: Kentrell Gaulden
- Producer: TayTayMadeIt

YoungBoy Never Broke Again singles chronology
"Toxic Punk" (2021)	"White Teeth" (2021)	"Everything Different" (2021)

Music video
- "White Teeth" on YouTube

"White Teeth" is a song by American rapper YoungBoy Never Broke Again. It was released on May 14, 2021, as the second single from his third studio album Sincerely, Kentrell. It was produced by TayTayMadeIt.

== Composition ==
In the song, YoungBoy mentions discarding his grills and his pearly white teeth, while also rapping about his love life and other "flexes".

== Music video ==
The music video, directed by Picture Perfect, executive produced by James "Aggie" Barrett features NBA YoungBoy showing his pearly white teeth in front of a convenience store and his car, and wearing a sombrero with flames in some scenes. He is surrounded by "a bevy of beautiful women", with whom he lives the "rockstar life".

== Charts ==
Chart (2021)	Peak position
US Billboard Hot 100	78
US Hot R&B/Hip-Hop Songs (Billboard)	39

== Certifications ==
Region	Certification	Certified units/sales
United States (RIAA)	Gold	500,000^{‡}
^{‡} Sales+streaming figures based on certification alone.
