= On My Side (song) =

Single by YoungBoy Never Broke Again

from the album Sincerely, Kentrell
- Released: September 17, 2021
- Length: 2:28
- Label: Never Broke Again; Atlantic
- Songwriters: Kentrell Gaulden; Jason Goldberg; Leor Shevah; Ethan Hayes
- Producers: Cheese; Leor Shevah; Haze

YoungBoy Never Broke Again singles chronology
"Life Support" (2021)	"On My Side" (2021)	"Hit" (2022)

Music video
- "On My Side" on YouTube

"On My Side" is a song by American rapper YoungBoy Never Broke Again. It was released on September 17, 2021, as the fifth single from his third studio album Sincerely, Kentrell (2021). The song peaked at number 37 on the Billboard Hot 100.

== Composition ==
The song sees YoungBoy singing about women, successes and guns, and is a story of how "someone who may have gotten involved in something they'll soon regret".

== Charts ==
Chart (2021)	Peak position
US Billboard Hot 100	37
US Hot R&B/Hip-Hop Songs (Billboard)	12

== Certifications ==
Region	Certification	Certified units/sales
United States (RIAA)	Gold	500,000^{‡}
^{‡} Sales+streaming figures based on certification alone.
