= Bad Morning =

2021 song by YoungBoy Never Broke Again

Song by YoungBoy Never Broke Again

from the album Sincerely, Kentrell
- Released: September 24, 2021
- Genre: Southern hip-hop; trap
- Length: 3:49
- Label: Never Broke Again; Atlantic
- Songwriters: Kentrell Gaulden; Aaron Lockhart; William Golden Mosley Jr.; Michael Laury
- Producers: Dubba-AA; The Lottery; Mike Laury

Audio video
- "Bad Morning" on YouTube

"Bad Morning" is a song by American rapper YoungBoy Never Broke Again, released on September 24, 2021, as the opening track from his third studio album, Sincerely, Kentrell . Released while incarcerated, the song portrays an image of pain and suffering while also including a sense of gangsta rap as he speaks about firearms and illegal activity.

== Background ==
The song was first teased by YoungBoy via his Instagram as a Triller snippet prior to his incarceration. Garnering major attention while incarcerated, YoungBoy's team added it to Sincerely, Kentrell.

In the songs, YoungBoy makes notable references to DaBaby's chart-topping 2019 studio album Kirk as he rapped: "Ridin' bumpin' Kirk with a .30 and a pole." He also made references to his devotion to Islam as he rapped: "All praise to Allah, one was dead in less than sixty." YoungBoy also made direct reference to Herm Tha BlackSheep, YoungBoy's close friend and Never Broke Again-signee.

== Critical reception ==
Rolling Stone's Will Dukes noted that "over somber pianos and a soulful organ[s]," YoungBoy "reflects on some of his regrets." HotNewHipHop's Will Aron A. stated that "gospel organs and shredding guitars fuel the production for NBA Youngboy to offer a dose of honest reflection and bossed up flexes. It’s a song that captures Youngboy’s trials and tribulations, as well as his perseverance throughout the ups and downs."

== Charts ==
Chart (2020)	Peak position
Global 200 (Billboard)	55
US Billboard Hot 100	28
US Hot R&B/Hip-Hop Songs (Billboard)	9

== Certifications ==
Region	Certification	Certified units/sales
United States (RIAA)	Platinum	1,000,000^{‡}
^{‡} Sales+streaming figures based on certification alone.
