= AI YoungBoy =

2017 mixtape by YoungBoy Never Broke Again

Mixtape by YoungBoy Never Broke Again
- Released: August 4, 2017
- Genres: Hip hop; gangsta rap; trap
- Length: 44:28
- Labels: Never Broke Again; Atlantic
- Producers: Bee’s Knees; CashMoneyAP; D. Brooks Exclusive; DJ Chose; DJ Shawdi P; DJ Swift; Dubba-AA; Figurez Made It; Go Grizzly; Hvsque; Louie Bandz; Nard & B; Niko The Kid; Pooh Beatz; Red On Da Track; Supah Mario; Tahj Money; XL Eagle; Yatta Beats

YoungBoy Never Broke Again chronology
Mind of a Menace 3 (2016)	AI YoungBoy (2017)	Ain't Too Long (2017)

Singles from AI YoungBoy
- 1. "Untouchable" Released: May 30, 2017; 2. "No Smoke" Released: August 3, 2017

AI YoungBoy is the seventh solo mixtape by American rapper YoungBoy Never Broke Again. It was released on August 4, 2017, by Never Broke Again, distributed by Atlantic Records, serving as his first commercial release with Atlantic. The mixtape features guest appearances from Peewee Longway and Yo Gotti. The mixtape also features production from Dubba-AA, DJ Swift, CashMoneyAP, DJ Shawdi P, and Nard & B, among others. The mixtape peaked at number 24 on the US Billboard 200, making YoungBoy's first entry on the chart.

The mixtape was supported by two singles: "Untouchable" and "No Smoke".

A sequel was released on October 11, 2019.

== Promotion ==
=== Singles ===
The lead single from the mixtape, "Untouchable", was released on May 30, 2017, with the accompanied music video. The song was produced by D. Brooks Exclusive.

The second single and final single from the mixtape, "No Smoke", was released on August 3, 2017, with the accompanied music video, before the mixtape was released. The song was produced by DJ Chose.

=== Music videos ===
The music video, "Graffiti", was released on July 28, 2017.

The music video, "Wat Chu Gone Do" featuring American rapper Peewee Longway, was released on August 18, 2017.

== Critical reception ==
Professional ratings
Review scores
Source	Rating
Pitchfork	7.6/10

AI YoungBoy received positive reviews from music critics. Writing for Pitchfork, Sheldon Pearce noted that "the teenage rapper from Baton Rouge is quiet outside his raps, which teem with pent-up aggression and anxiety," because of this, he continued that "many songs read like journal entries." Continuing his review, Pearce states that YoungBoy "spills his guts in a grisly drawl still coated in a nasally boyish rasp, constantly negotiating the terms of innocence and indecency." Pearce concludes his review by writing that "AI YoungBoy he evolves as a writer and rapper, and he begins to realize his versatility."

=== Year-end lists ===
Select year-end rankings of AI YoungBoy
Publication	List	Rank
Mass Appeal	The 25 Best Albums of 2017	18
Jon Caramanica for The New York Times	Best Albums of 2017	19
Noisey	The 100 Best Albums of 2017	45

== Commercial performance ==
AI YoungBoy debuted at 24 on the US Billboard 200, which became YoungBoy's first entry on the chart. The mixtape also debuted at number 17 on the US Top R&B/Hip-Hop Albums and at number 12 on the US Top Rap Albums charts, which was also YoungBoy's first entry on both charts as well. On August 4, 2020, the album was certified platinum by the Recording Industry Association of America (RIAA) for combined sales and album-equivalent units of over a million units in the United States.

== Track listing ==
Track listing and credits were adapted from Spotify and Genius.

No.	Title	Producer(s)	Length
1.	"Trappin'"	Supah Mario	3:12
2.	"Wat Chu Gone Do" (featuring Peewee Longway)	Tahj Money; Hvsque	3:14
3.	"No Smoke"	DJ Chose	2:40
4.	"Ride on 'Em"	Dubba-AA; Louie Bandz	2:55
5.	"Dark into Light" (featuring Yo Gotti)	Nard & B; XL Eagle	2:44
6.	"No. 9"	Red On Da Track	3:03
7.	"Untouchable"	D. Brooks Exclusive	3:00
8.	"Left Hand, Right Hand"	Niko The Kid; Bee's Knees	2:42
9.	"Twilight"	CashMoneyAP	3:00
10.	"Came From"	Dubba-AA	3:25
11.	"Murda Gang"	Dubba-AA	2:54
12.	"Have You Ever"	Dubba-AA; DJ Swift; Louie Bandz	3:13
13.	"Graffiti"	Yatta Beats; DJ Shawdi P; Figurez Made It	3:26
14.	"GG"	Dubba-AA; DJ Swift	2:04
15.	"Dedicated"	Go Grizzly; Pooh Beats	2:49

== Charts ==
=== Weekly charts ===
Weekly chart performance for AI YoungBoy
Chart (2017)	Peak position
US Billboard 200	24
US Top R&B/Hip-Hop Albums (Billboard)	17
US Top Rap Albums (Billboard)	12

=== Year-end charts ===
2017 year-end chart performance for AI YoungBoy
Chart (2017)	Position
US Top R&B/Hip-Hop Albums (Billboard)	71

2018 year-end chart performance for AI YoungBoy
Chart (2018)	Position
US Billboard 200	178
US Top R&B/Hip-Hop Albums (Billboard)	81

== Certifications ==
Certifications for AI YoungBoy
Region	Certification	Certified units/sales
United States (RIAA)	Platinum	1,000,000^{‡}
^{‡} Sales+streaming figures based on certification alone.
