= Nevada (YoungBoy Never Broke Again song) =

Single by YoungBoy Never Broke Again

Single by YoungBoy Never Broke Again

from the album Sincerely, Kentrell
- Released: July 7, 2021
- Recorded: 2020
- Genre: Southern hip-hop
- Length: 2:35
- Label: Never Broke Again; Atlantic
- Songwriters: Kentrell Gaulden; Thomas Horton; David Boonpetch
- Producers: TnTXD; Vadebeatz

YoungBoy Never Broke Again singles chronology
"WusYaName" (2021)	"Nevada" (2021)	"Life Support" (2021)

"Nevada" is a song by American rapper YoungBoy Never Broke Again. It was released on July 7, 2021, as the third single from his third studio album Sincerely, Kentrell. The song was produced by TnTXD and Vadebeatz.

== Composition ==
The song finds YoungBoy melodically rapping over an electric guitar instrumental. It has been called an "apparent ode to his significant other": "Don't know who I want, you the one I want / Never said I don't, that's that money talk / Drunker than a skunk, it go down in the room / Choppas in the trunk, baby, this that slime tone".

== Charts ==
Chart performance for "Nevada"
Chart (2021)	Peak position
Global 200 (Billboard)	109
US Billboard Hot 100	58
US Hot R&B/Hip-Hop Songs (Billboard)	23

== Certifications ==
Region	Certification	Certified units/sales
New Zealand (RMNZ)	Platinum	30,000^{‡}
United States (RIAA)	Platinum	1,000,000^{‡}
^{‡} Sales+streaming figures based on certification alone.
