= Life Support (song) =

Single by YoungBoy Never Broke Again

Single by YoungBoy Never Broke Again

from the album Sincerely, Kentrell
- Released: September 10, 2021
- Length: 3:53
- Label: Never Broke Again; Atlantic
- Songwriters: Kentrell Gaulden; Jason Goldberg; Samuel Jimenez; Michael Mora; Michael Samuels; Travis Tatad
- Producers: Cheese; Smash David; Ravis; Stunner Samples; SMPLGTWY

YoungBoy Never Broke Again singles chronology
"Nevada" (2021)	"Life Support" (2021)	"On My Side" (2021)

Music video
- "Life Support" on YouTube

"Life Support" is a song by American rapper YoungBoy Never Broke Again, released on September 10, 2021, as the fourth single from his third studio album Sincerely, Kentrell. It was produced by Jason Goldberg, Ravis, Stunner Samples, Smash David, and SMPLGTWY.

== Composition ==
Jordan Rose of Complex wrote that the lyrics of the song "weave a tale of survival". YoungBoy covers "heavy topics" such as taking his grandmother to chemotherapy, describes how his pain "keeps him going" and feeling like he is living on life support.

== Music video ==
A music video for the song was directed by Rich Porter. It contains snippets of YoungBoy, and shows him driving around town, spending time with his girlfriend, and working in the studio.

== Charts ==
Chart performance for "Life Support"
Chart (2021)	Peak position
Global 200 (Billboard)	107
US Billboard Hot 100	48
US Hot R&B/Hip-Hop Songs (Billboard)	17

== Certifications ==
Region	Certification	Certified units/sales
United States (RIAA)	Platinum	1,000,000^{‡}
^{‡} Sales+streaming figures based on certification alone.
