= No Smoke (YoungBoy Never Broke Again song) =

Single by YoungBoy Never Broke Again

from the album AI YoungBoy
- Released: August 3, 2017
- Length: 2:40
- Label: Never Broke Again; Atlantic
- Songwriter: Kentrell Gaulden
- Producer: DJ Chose

YoungBoy Never Broke Again singles chronology
"Untouchable" (2017)	"No Smoke" (2017)	"Outside Today" (2018)

Music video
- "No Smoke" on YouTube

"No Smoke" is a song by American rapper YoungBoy Never Broke Again and the second single from his seventh mixtape AI YoungBoy (2017). It was written by YoungBoy and produced by DJ Chose. The song was ranked number 33 on The Fader's list of the 101 best songs of 2017.

== Composition ==
The song is directed at NBA YoungBoy's foes; he warns his foes that they don't want any issues with him. Mitch Findlay of HotNewHipHop suggests that it is possibly a subtle response to rappers who are trying to ban him from his own city.

== Charts ==
=== Weekly charts ===
Chart (2017–2018)	Peak position
US Billboard Hot 100	61
US Hot R&B/Hip-Hop Songs (Billboard)	29

=== Year-end charts ===
Chart (2018)	Position
US Hot R&B/Hip-Hop Songs (Billboard)	88

== Certifications ==
Region	Certification	Certified units/sales
United States (RIAA)	3× Platinum	3,000,000^{‡}
^{‡} Sales+streaming figures based on certification alone.
