= Untouchable (YoungBoy Never Broke Again song) =

Single by YoungBoy Never Broke Again

from the album AI YoungBoy
- Released: May 30, 2017
- Length: 3:00
- Label: Never Broke Again; Atlantic
- Songwriter: Kentrell Gaulden
- Producer: D. Brooks Exclusive

YoungBoy Never Broke Again singles chronology
| "Untouchable" (2017) | "No Smoke" (2017) |

Music video
- "Untouchable" on YouTube

"Untouchable" is a song by American rapper YoungBoy Never Broke Again, released on May 30, 2017. It is the lead single from his mixtape AI YoungBoy, and was produced by D. Brooks Exclusive.

== Background ==
Prior to the song's release, YoungBoy served time for attempted second degree murder. In an interview with Genius, he stated that "Untouchable" was the last song he recorded before he was incarcerated, and the first he recorded after he was released. It is also the first song that YoungBoy released after his release on May 22, 2017.

== Composition ==
The song is about NBA YoungBoy returning to his path of success, and pledging loyalty to the "folks in his circle". He raps, "I remember I wanted to quit for so many times / But I know this moment would come, now it's my time / I gotta make up for all them nights that my momma cried / I'm going in, I'm putting everything on the line".

== Music video ==
A music video was released alongside the single. Directed by David G, it features footage from the first day he was released from jail. The video opens with YoungBoy talking with rapper Meek Mill about collaborating on a song on FaceTime; Mill tells him to leave Baton Rouge. YoungBoy is seen reuniting with his family and hanging out with his crew, as they ride from Baton Rouge to New Orleans and throw a hotel pool party.

== Charts ==
| Chart (2017) | Peak position |
|---|---|
| US Billboard Hot 100 | 95 |
| US Hot R&B/Hip-Hop Songs (Billboard) | 39 |

== Certifications ==
| Region | Certification | Certified units/sales |
|---|---|---|
| New Zealand (RMNZ) | Platinum | 30,000^{‡} |
| United Kingdom (BPI) | Silver | 200,000^{‡} |
| United States (RIAA) | 2× Platinum | 2,000,000^{‡} |
^{‡} Sales+streaming figures based on certification alone.
