= YoungBoy Never Broke Again =

American rapper (born 1999)

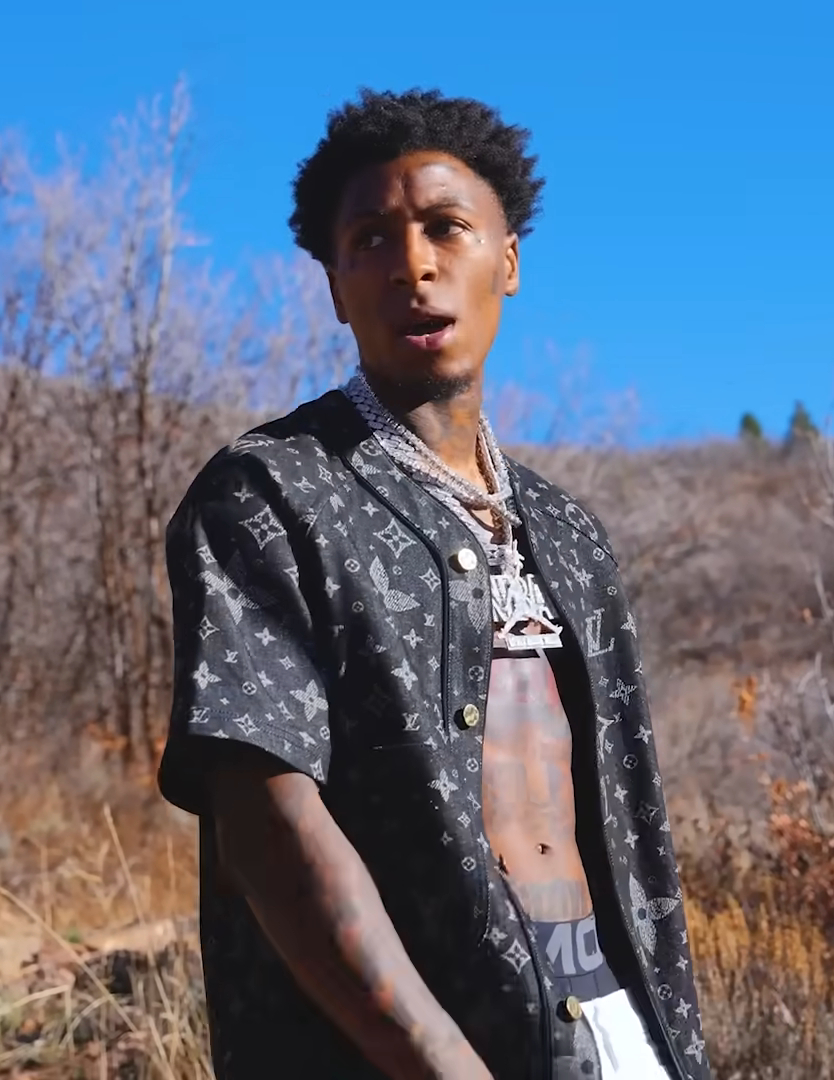
- YoungBoy in 2023

Background information
- Also known as: NBA YoungBoy; Top; Lil Top; YoungBoy; YB; AI YoungBoy; WeightgangKG; 38 Baby; Slimeto; Veeta
- Born: Kentrell DeSean Gaulden; October 20, 1999 (age 27); Baton Rouge, Louisiana, U.S.
- Genres: Southern hip hop; gangsta rap; trap; drill
- Occupations: Rapper; singer; songwriter
- Works: Discography
- Years active: 2015–present
- Labels: Never Broke Again; Motown (current); Atlantic; APG (former)
- Spouse: Jazlyn Mychelle Hayes (m. 2023)
- Children: ≥11
- Website: youngboynba.com

Logo
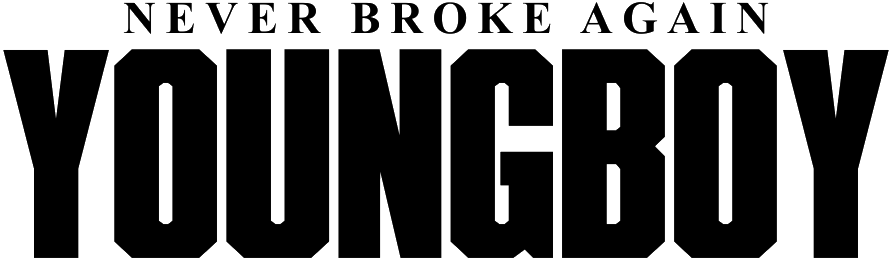

Kentrell DeSean Gaulden (born October 20, 1999), known professionally as YoungBoy Never Broke Again or NBA YoungBoy, is an American rapper, singer, and songwriter. Gaulden released eight mixtapes from 2015 to 2017, and garnered a regional following for his work. He signed with Atlantic Records and Artist Partner Group in the latter year to release the singles "Untouchable" and "No Smoke", both of which marked his first entries on the Billboard Hot 100. Released in January 2018, his single "Outside Today" became his first to peak within the chart's top 40, and received quadruple platinum certification by the Recording Industry Association of America (RIAA). It served as both his mainstream breakthrough and the lead single for his debut studio album, Until Death Call My Name (2018), which peaked at number seven on the US Billboard 200 despite mixed critical reception.

His 2019 single, "Bandit" (with Juice Wrld), became his first song to reach the top ten of the Billboard Hot 100. Released the following week, his commercial mixtape, AI YoungBoy 2 (2019), debuted atop the Billboard 200 and received 18 gold certifications by the RIAA for each of its tracks. The release of its follow-up, 38 Baby 2 (2020), and his second studio album, Top (2020), made Gaulden the second hip hop act to peak the chart thrice within a single year. (Note: American rapper Future was the first rapper to achieve this in 2017, although Gaulden became the first to do so with solo projects.) His third album, Sincerely, Kentrell (2021), was released during an incarceration, and became the third project—behind Tupac Shakur's Me Against the World (1995) and Lil Wayne's I Am Not a Human Being (2010)—by an imprisoned artist to debut atop the Billboard 200. His fourth album, The Last Slimeto (2022), peaked at number two on the chart and served as his final release with Atlantic. Gaulden signed with Motown to release his fifth and sixth albums: I Rest My Case and Don't Try This at Home (both 2023), both of which peaked within the top-ten of the Billboard 200 despite trailing critical reception. Gaulden's seventh studio album I Just Got a Lot on My Shoulders (2024), witnessed a steep commercial decline, while his eighth and ninth albums, MASA (2025) and Slime Cry (2026), both peaked within the chart's top ten.

Gaulden has sold over 109 million digital copies in the United States, ranking him among the highest certified artists in the United States. He has garnered 15 billion views on his YouTube channel, also ranking him among the highest-viewed rappers on the site. He is the youngest artist in Billboard history to chart 100 singles on the Billboard Hot 100, while also being the rapper with the most RIAA platinum certified albums from 2015 to 2025, and the most certified rapper in RIAA history with 126 certified titles. Gaulden has 34 albums that have charted on the Billboard 200 chart, the most of any rapper, and has been nominated for three BET Hip Hop Awards and a Grammy Award while being the recipient of one ASCAP Rhythm & Soul Music Award and one BMI R&B/Hip-Hop Award. He founded the record label Never Broke Again in 2015, which has signed artists including NoCap and Quando Rondo.

Despite his success, Gaulden's career has been marked by a long history of legal issues that began in 2016. He has maintained a largely prolific output notwithstanding his incarcerations. Gaulden has infamously spent several years on house arrest from 2021 to 2024. He was arrested in Baton Rouge, Louisiana, in 2020 alongside sixteen others on various federal charges, including distribution and manufacturing of drugs and possession of stolen firearms. In 2021, he was arrested in Los Angeles, California, by federal agents stemming from his 2020 arrest, resulting in an additional federal firearm charge. From March to October 2021, Gaulden was in jail before being released on bond and placed on house arrest awaiting trial from October 2021 to March 2024. Gaulden was found not guilty in the case in Los Angeles, but was found guilty in Baton Rouge and sentenced to 23 months in prison, followed by 60 months of probation following his release. After over three years in federal custody, including house arrest, Gaulden was released on probation in April 2025. In May 2025, after spending almost two months on probation, Gaulden was granted a presidential pardon by Donald Trump.

== Early life ==
Kentrell DeSean Gaulden was born on October 20, 1999, in Baton Rouge, Louisiana, to Sherhonda Gaulden and Jeffrey Staden. He broke his neck while wrestling as a toddler, the injury requiring a halo head brace until the spine healed. The brace left permanent scars on his forehead. Gaulden was raised mainly by his maternal grandmother, Alice Gaulden, due to his father being sentenced to 55 years in prison. He dropped out of Baton Rouge's Scotlandville Magnet High School in the ninth grade. While in juvenile detention for a robbery charge, he began writing lyrics for his debut project.

After he was released, Gaulden's grandmother died of heart failure in 2010 and he was sent to a group home in which he noted that he would get beat up:

I used to get beat up inside the group home for no reason, the other boys would put their hands on me, and I would look up like, 'Why are you hitting me, bro? What'd I do?' It made me discover another side of me that I never glorified or liked. I found out how to be the person that you don't want to do that with. [Before then], I never understood all the evilness or wrong because I was showered by so much love from this one person.

He later moved in with his friend and fellow Baton Rouge rapper, OG3Three Never Broke Again. The two then used acts of criminality to begin to pay for studio time.

== Career ==
=== 2015–2017: Career beginnings and AI YoungBoy ===
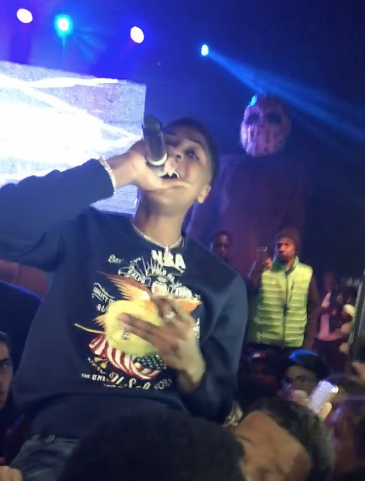
Gaulden performing in 2017

Gaulden first began producing music with a microphone he bought from Walmart when he was fourteen years old. He released his first mixtape, Life Before Fame in 2015. A string of other mixtapes followed including Mind of a Menace, Mind of a Menace 2, and Before I Go. Gaulden attracted attention with his October 2016 mixtape, 38 Baby which featured fellow Baton Rouge natives, Boosie Badazz, Kevin Gates, and fellow rappers Stroke Tha Don and NBA 3Three. A week later, Gaulden released another mixtape titled Mind of a Menace 3 on November 4, 2016. Gaulden's quick rise to popularity could also be attributed to his "song-for-song rap beef" with fellow Baton Rouge rapper Scotty Cain in December 2015, in which songs from both rappers included death threats. Although no real violence ever occurred between the two Baton Rouge rappers, their feuding attracted a lot of attention.

In November 2016, Gaulden was arrested in Austin, Texas on suspicion of attempted first-degree murder in connection with an alleged drive-by shooting. While in jail in East Baton Rouge Parish, Louisiana, Gaulden re-released his two mixtapes, Before I Go and Mind of a Menace 3. Gaulden was released from prison in May 2017 after taking a plea deal and posting bail. A week after leaving prison, Gaulden released the single, "Untouchable".

In July 2017, Gaulden released a video for his song, "41", that included cameos from notable artists including, Meek Mill, Young Thug, 21 Savage, Boosie Badazz, and Yo Gotti. In August 2017, it was reported that after being scouted by Mike Caren, Gaulden signed a five-album record deal worth $2 million with Caren's Artist Partner Group and Atlantic Records while the music had been published under Gaulden's own Never Broke Again. On August 3, 2017, he released his seventh mixtape, AI YoungBoy which charted at 24 on the Billboard 200, marking Gaulden's first appearance on the chart. The single, "Untouchable", peaked at number 95 on the Billboard Hot 100 chart. The second single from the project, "No Smoke", peaked at number 61 on the Billboard Hot 100.

Gaulden's eighth mixtape, Ain't Too Long was released on October 7, 2017. The mixtape peaked at No. 173 on the Billboard 200 chart, marking Gaulden's second appearance on the chart. Just a month later, in November 2017, Gaulden appeared as a guest on 21 Savage's Numb The Pain Tour.

=== 2018–2019: Until Death Call My Name and AI YoungBoy 2 ===
Gaulden released the single "Outside Today" on January 6, 2018. The song became Gaulden's highest-charting song, peaking at number 31 on the Billboard Hot 100. He announced his debut studio album, Until Death Call My Name on January 11, 2018. The album's second single "Diamond Teeth Samurai", an interpolation of Lil Wayne's October 1999, "Tha Block Is Hot" was released on April 2, 2018, just three weeks prior to the release of the album. The song peaked at No. 59 on the Billboard Hot 100. The album was released on April 27, 2018. Following the release of "Villain" on June 21, 2018, Gaulden released a reloaded version of Until Death Call My Name which featured guest appearances from Offset and Lil Uzi Vert on June 28, 2018.

Despite being arrested in February 2018, Gaulden promised a new mixtape. Gaulden was released from jail on March 15, and his next mixtape Master The Day Of Judgement was released on May 19, 2018. Throughout the summer of 2018, Gaulden released a series of four EPs, each containing four tracks. The first of which, 4Respect, was released on August 24, followed by 4Freedom, 4Loyalty, and 4WhatImportant on August 30, September 6, and 14, respectively. In conjunction with the final part being released, all four EPs were combined into a 16-track compilation titled 4Respect 4Freedom 4Loyalty 4WhatImportant. On September 7, Gaulden released his mixtape Decided, featuring a sole guest appearance from Trippie Redd. On December 20, Gaulden released another mixtape, Realer, featuring guest appearances from Lil Baby and Plies.

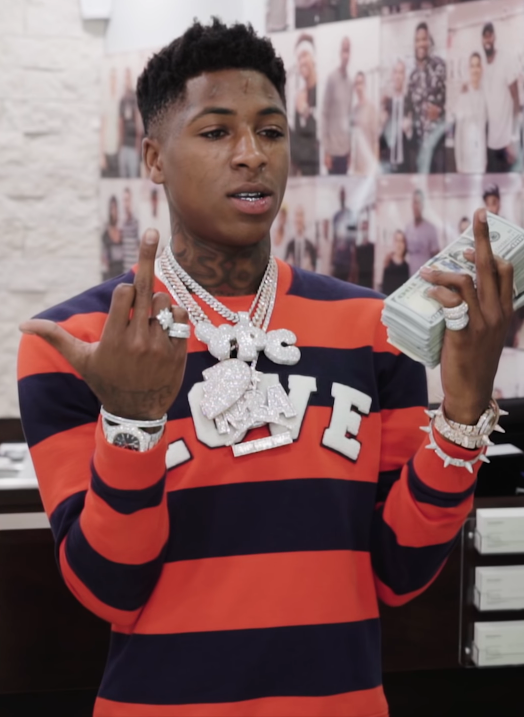
Gaulden in 2018 shopping at a jewelry store in Atlanta

By January 2019, Gaulden was on YouTube's Top Music Artists list in the United States for the previous 101 weeks, which made him the most-watched musician across all genres. This was mainly due in part to his consistency of releasing music regularly and exclusively on YouTube. He was also the ninth best-selling artist on the 2019 Billboard Mid-Year Charts and was seventh in the top ten artists ranked by on-demand audio streams without releasing a project in the first six months of 2019. Gaulden was sentenced to 14 months on house arrest following a probation violation earlier in 2019. Due to the house arrest, he was unable to record music from anywhere besides his house. On September 25, 2019, Gaulden released the "aptly titled" single "House Arrest Tingz". On October 4, 2019, Gaulden released the song "Bandit", with rapper Juice WRLD, released as the final new song by Juice WRLD as a lead artist before his death. The song reached number 10 on the US Billboard Hot 100, becoming Gaulden's highest-charting single.

On October 10, 2019, Gaulden released his mixtape AI YoungBoy 2, and debuted at number one on the US Billboard 200. The mixtape is a sequel to his 2017 breakout AI Youngboy and features 18 songs, including the previously released song "Slime Mentality". The album earned 110,000 album-equivalent units (including 3,000 pure sales), accumulating a total of 144.7 million on-demand audio streams in its first week, becoming one of the top ten biggest streaming debuts of 2019.

=== 2020–2021: 38 Baby 2, Top, and Sincerely, Kentrell ===
In February 2020, Gaulden released his mixtape, Still Flexin, Still Steppin. It debuted at number two on the US Billboard 200, becoming his second-highest-charting album after his 2019 number-one album AI YoungBoy 2.

On April 24, 2020, Gaulden released his mixtape 38 Baby 2, a sequel to his October 2016 38 Baby. The mixtape debuted at number one on the Billboard 200 marking Gaulden's second number-one album on the chart. The mixtape peak was a result of the 67,000 album-equivalent units (including 4,000 pure album sales) in its first week, after the 96.9 million on-demand streams in its first week.

On August 20, 2020, Gaulden announced the release of his second studio album titled Top. The album was preceded by the Hot 100-charting singles, "All In", "Kacey Talk", and "Callin" featuring Snoop Dogg. The album was released as planned on September 11, 2020, debuting at number one on the Billboard 200, becoming Gaulden's third number-one album in under one year. Top sold 126,000 album-equivalent units (including 19,000 pure album sales) in its first week, accumulating 156.32 million on-demand US streams from all its tracks. The album marked Gaulden's highest-selling album, until the release of his third studio album. However, with AI YoungBoy 2, 38 Baby 2 and Top, he became the first rapper in the history of the Billboard 200 to accumulate three number-one albums in ten months, with the latter two peaking atop the chart within six months, one month behind the previous record held by DMX between 1998 and 1999, and the fastest for a rapper.

On November 11, 2020, Gaulden released his fourth solo project of 2020, the mixtape Until I Return, a sequel to his June 2016 Before I Go. It was released exclusively on YouTube and was made available three days later to streaming services with four additional songs. The mixtape has no guest features and peaked at number eleven on the Billboard' 200. On November 20, 2020, Gaulden released a collaborative project with Rich the Kid, titled Nobody Safe.

Gearing up for the release of his third studio album Sincerely, Kentrell while incarcerated, Gaulden released the singles "Toxic Punk", "White Teeth", "Nevada", "Life Support", and "On My Side", all of which peaked on the Billboard Hot 100, respectively. On September 24, 2021, Gaulden released his third studio album, Sincerely, Kentrell from prison. The album debuted at number one on the Billboard 200 making him the third artist besides 2Pac and Lil Wayne to have a number-one album while incarcerated. The album marked Gaulden's highest-selling album, overtaking Top as it sold 137,000 album-equivalent units (including 10,000 in pure sales) in its first week, acquiring 186.29 million on-demand streams across all of its tracks. The debut marked Gaulden's fourth number-one album on the charts. During the release of the album, the term "YB Better" had gone viral in social media as fans heavily commented the term on social media, subsequently, just four days following the album's release, a deluxe edition, Sincerely, Kentrell > (pronounced "better") was released which featured an additional two songs.

Following Gaulden's release from jail in late October 2021, he released a number of unofficial singles beginning in November, including "Safe then Sorry", "Heart and Soul" and "Alligator Walk", and "Black Ball". The singles led up to his collaborative mixtape with Birdman, From the Bayou, which was released on December 10, 2021, after initially being announced in March 2018. The mixtape peaked at number 19 on the Billboard 200.

=== 2022: Colors, The Last Slimeto, and numerous other projects ===
Gaulden released another mixtape, titled Colors, on January 21, 2022. This mixtape garnered attention due to the singles released previously, in which he dissed rappers King Von and NLE Choppa on the tracks "Bring the Hook" and "Know Like I Know", respectively. On March 4, 2022, Gaulden released Better than You, a collaborative mixtape with DaBaby.

On April 1, 2022, Gaulden released the Last Slimeto Sampler. In May, it was reported that Gaulden rejected CEO Craig Kallman's $25 million offer to renew his Atlantic deal, calling the label out on its artist integrity. The Last Slimeto was released as planned on August 5 as Gaulden's last release under Atlantic. The album was preceded by four singles, "Mr. Grim Reaper", "I Hate YoungBoy", "Don't Rate Me" featuring Quavo, and "Vette Motors". The album featured guest appearances from Kehlani, Quavo, and Rod Wave. The album debuted at number 2 on the Billboard 200, moving 108,400 album-equivalent units in its first week, 400 margins less than the week's number one album, Bad Bunny's Un Verano Sin Ti. Through Never Broke Again's Instagram page, it was announced that Gaulden had finally completed his contract with Atlantic Records.

Gaulden was featured on The Game's album Drillmatic – Heart vs. Mind, on the track, "O.P.P", but was later removed, a week after the album's released on August 12, 2022, over a clearance fee of $150,000 ordered by Gaulden, causing the track to be remastered without his contributions and thus, the album to be re-released.

On September 4, 2022, Gaulden released the YouTube exclusive single "Purge Me". On September 5, 2022, through DJ Akademiks it was announced that he would release a surprise mixtape titled Realer 2, presented as a sequel to his December 2018 Realer. However, the mixtape was not released according to plan. On September 6, 2022, at around 4 PM EST, the mixtape was released primarily to Gaulden's YouTube channel. Just a day later on September 7, the mixtape was added to all digital streaming platforms; despite Gaulden's departure from Atlantic Records, the mixtape was distributed through the label. On October 7, 2022, Gaulden released his twentieth mixtape, 3800 Degrees through Never Broke Again and Atlantic Records. The project pays homage to Juvenile's 1998 400 Degreez and Lil Wayne's 2002 500 Degreez. The mixtape features guest appearances from E-40, Mouse on tha Track, and Shy Glizzy. The project marks Gaulden's fifth release of 2022 (fourth solo). On October 16, he announced another project, Ma' I Got a Family, to be released the same week as his twenty-first project, and his sixth release of the year (fifth solo). Just days later, the tracklist was released, announcing Nicki Minaj and Yeat as the mixtape's only features. On October 21, 2022, the mixtape was released and was presented as a DJ Drama Gangsta Grillz exclusive.

Through Billboard, on October 24, 2022, it was announced that following the completion of Gaulden's contract with Atlantic Records, he would sign a joint venture contract between Motown Records and his own label Never Broke Again. The joint venture deal was signed just over a year prior in September 2021, prior to the announcement of Gaulden's addition to the label.

On November 25, 2022, Gaulden teamed up with Never Broke Again signee, Quando Rondo for their collaborative mixtape, 3860. The mixtape was preceded by four singles, "Give Me a Sign", the Quando Rondo solo cut "Cream Soda", "Keep Me Dry", and "It's On". Despite the project being uploaded to Gaulden's YouTube channel, on the day of the mixtape's release, he revealed that he did not want the mixtape to be released due to his past disputes with Atlantic Records, the label under which the mixtape was released under, subsequently leading to the removal of the mixtape from Gaulden's YouTube channel. Gaulden further noted that Quando respected his wishes for the mixtape to not be released, however, Atlantic Records proceeded to release the project. On December 23, 2022, Gaulden released the compilation album Lost Files which purely consisted of leaked songs from 2018 onwards. The project marked his final release of the year. The project peaked at number 45 on the Billboard 200 selling over 18,000 copies in its first tracking week.

=== 2023–2025: I Rest My Case, Don't Try This at Home, and MASA ===
On January 3, 2023, Gaulden's label released the official artwork for his fifth studio album I Rest My Case on their Instagram. On January 4, 2023, Gaulden released a series of promotional singles, most notably "Black" which peaked at number 93 respectively on the Billboard Hot 100. The album was released on January 6, 2023, and is his first project under a new artist deal with Motown Records. The album peaked at number nine on the Billboard 200, marking Gaulden's lowest charting studio album. Through Billboard, on February 1, 2023, Gaulden was announced to appear on the magazine's cover which was released alongside an interview. Appearing on the cover marked his first in five years since his October 2017 appearance on The Fader. Through the interview, it was noted that Gaulden's sixth full-length studio album titled Don't Try This at Home was in the works.

On February 24, 2023, Gaulden appeared as a feature on Yeat's third studio album Afterlyfe on the second track, "Shmunk". Weeks later, on March 17, 2023, he would appear as a feature on "I Don't Mind", the fifth track on Lil Pump's third long-awaited studio album, Lil Pump 2.

On February 27, 2023, Gaulden released "Next", a promotional single leading up to his sixth studio album, Don't Try This at Home. Just days later on March 2, 2023, he issued another single, "Demon Party". Weeks later, through Motown Record's official Instagram, it was announced that the album would drop on April 21, 2023, and it would consist of thirty-three songs. Following the album's announcement, the album's lead single, "WTF" with the Trinidadian rapper Nicki Minaj was announced. The track was released on April 7, 2023, just two weeks before the release of the project. The album's second and final single, "Rear View" with the Atlanta singer Mariah the Scientist was released on April 14, 2023. The album was released according to plan on April 21, 2023, featuring guest appearances from Mariah the Scientist, Nicki Minaj, Post Malone, and the Kid Laroi. The album debuted at number 5 on the Billboard 200 after selling 60,000 album-equivalent units in its first week. Furthermore, Gaulden became the youngest artist in Billboard history to chart 100 songs on the Hot 100 after "Big Truck" debuted at No. 100 on the chart.

On May 8, 2023, Gaulden announced a mixtape titled Richest Opp and its release date of May 12, the original release date of rival Lil Durk's album, Almost Healed. Just a day prior to the release of the mixtape, Gaulden released the track "Bitch Let's Do It" exclusively to his YouTube channel. The mixtape released as planned while Almost Healed was pushed back to release the following week. Richest Opp debuted at number four on the Billboard 200 with 51,000 album-equivalent units in its first week. The mixtape garnered attention due to a song titled "Fuck the Industry Pt. 2" in which Gaulden called out multiple rappers including Drake, J. Cole, and Lil Yachty.

On June 12, 2023, Playboi Carti gifted Gaulden an Opium chain, which was a black diamond chain with an upside-down cross pendant, and he had taken to his Instagram account after a long hiatus to show the rapper wearing the chain. The makers of the chain, Jewelry Unlimited, responded that the chain was a gift from Carti, ahead of a collaborative album between the two, which was hinted to be titled, 004KT. On the same day, record producer F1lthy, alongside the executive producer of Carti's then-upcoming solo album, Music (released on March 14, 2025), had taken to Twitter (now X) to tweet "004KT", further creating discussions about the collaborative project.

On October 26, 2023, Gaulden released the music video for "Deep Down". A day later, on October 27, 2023, Gaulden released two more singles, "Now Who" and "My Body". The singles would appear on Gaulden's twenty-first mixtape, Decided 2, the sequel to his September 2018, Decided, which was later released on November 10. At the end of 2023, Gaulden became the most streamed rap artist on YouTube for the fifth year straight in the United States and was the second most streamed artist overall behind Peso Pluma. Gaulden was the sixth best-selling artist in the US in 2023 with 4.2 million album units sold.

During Gaulden's Million Dollaz Worth of Game interview, he stated that his next release would be his last with Motown. On January 27, 2024, Gaulden took to his Instagram to tease a new album that would drop on April 19. After releasing several singles in the first quarter of 2024, on March 17, Gaulden shared the official artwork and title for his next release, I Just Got a Lot on My Shoulders, expected to release in 2024. Following a series of leaks while incarcerated, consisting of music, music videos, vlogs, behind-the-scenes footage, and text messages, in November 2024, Gaulden released five music videos on YouTube: "Never Stopping", "Catch Me", "Missing Everything", "Sneaking", and "Killa Season". On December 6, Gaulden's seventh studio album, I Just Got a Lot on My Shoulders was released while he was incarcerated.

On February 27, 2025, it was announced that Gaulden would release his third compilation album, More Leaks, on March 7. Upon Gaulden's release from prison in the following month, his team hinted at a tour in late 2025. On May 2, Gaulden released "Where I Been" and "Shot Callin" exclusively to his YouTube channel before his associate, Kyle "Montana" Claiborne revealed that he is working on an album and a tour, which would be his first since 2020. On May 15, Gaulden and his label had taken to Instagram to announce his 2025 Make America Slime Again Tour in the United States, supported by DeeBaby, EBK Jaaybo, and K3. The 45-stop tour commenced on September 2, in Dallas, Texas, and concluded on November 12, in Seattle, Washington. The tour grossed approximately $70 million with over 500,000 tickets sold, making it one of the top-ten selling solo hip-hop tours in history. On June 16, Gaulden announced via Instagram story that he would release his eighth studio album, MASA, on July 4, 2025. MASA ended up being released as a ten track sampler and was pushed back to July 25. On July 13, Gaulden appeared alongside Travis Scott as a surprise guest appearance on "Outside", the fifteenth cut of the Scott-founded rap group, JackBoys' second collaborative compilation album, JackBoys 2. Gaulden released Deshawn, a mixtape hosted by DJ Khaled, on August 12, 2025. During the final weeks of Gaulden's Make America Slime Again Tour, building off the success of his singles "Shot Callin" and "What You Is" going viral on social media, Gaulden announced his ninth full-length studio album, Slime Cry to release on November 28, however, it was pushed back for an unknown reason. On November 15, Boosie Badazz released the mixtape, 225 Business with each song featuring Gaulden. Despite it being promoted as a collaborative mixtape, only Boosie is credited as a lead artist due to clearance issues from Gaulden's label.

=== 2026–present: Slime Cry ===
On January 14, 2026, it was announced that Gaulden would headline the final night of Rolling Loud's first festival in Orlando, Florida at the Camping World Stadium. On the same day, it was announced that a Make America Slime Again Tour concert documentary, directed by Nico Ballesteros is in production to be distributed by Foundation Media Partners and Gaulden's newly-founded 38 Films. On January 16, Gaulden released his ninth studio album, Slime Cry featuring guest appearances from Burna Boy and Jelly Roll. On the same day, the RIAA crowned Gaulden as the most certified rapper of all time with 126 RIAA certified titles.

Upon the release of the album, on January 20, 2026, Gaulden was revealed as the cover star for Complex while appearing in an interview with the publication. Gaulden revealed that he plans to go on tour again in 2026, revealing that it will feature a European leg; Gaulden also stated that he would release a maximum of four projects in 2026.

Between February 4 and 16, 2026, Gaulden released the music videos for "I Want" and "Headtap". On April 22, 2026, the concert documentary, American YoungBoy, which chronicles Gaulden's previous Make America Slime Again tour, was released.

On June 26, 2026, Gaulden released ML2, a 20-track sequel to his 2025 compilation More Leaks.

Gaulden released the single "Try So Hard" on July 3, 2026.

== Artistry ==
=== Influences ===
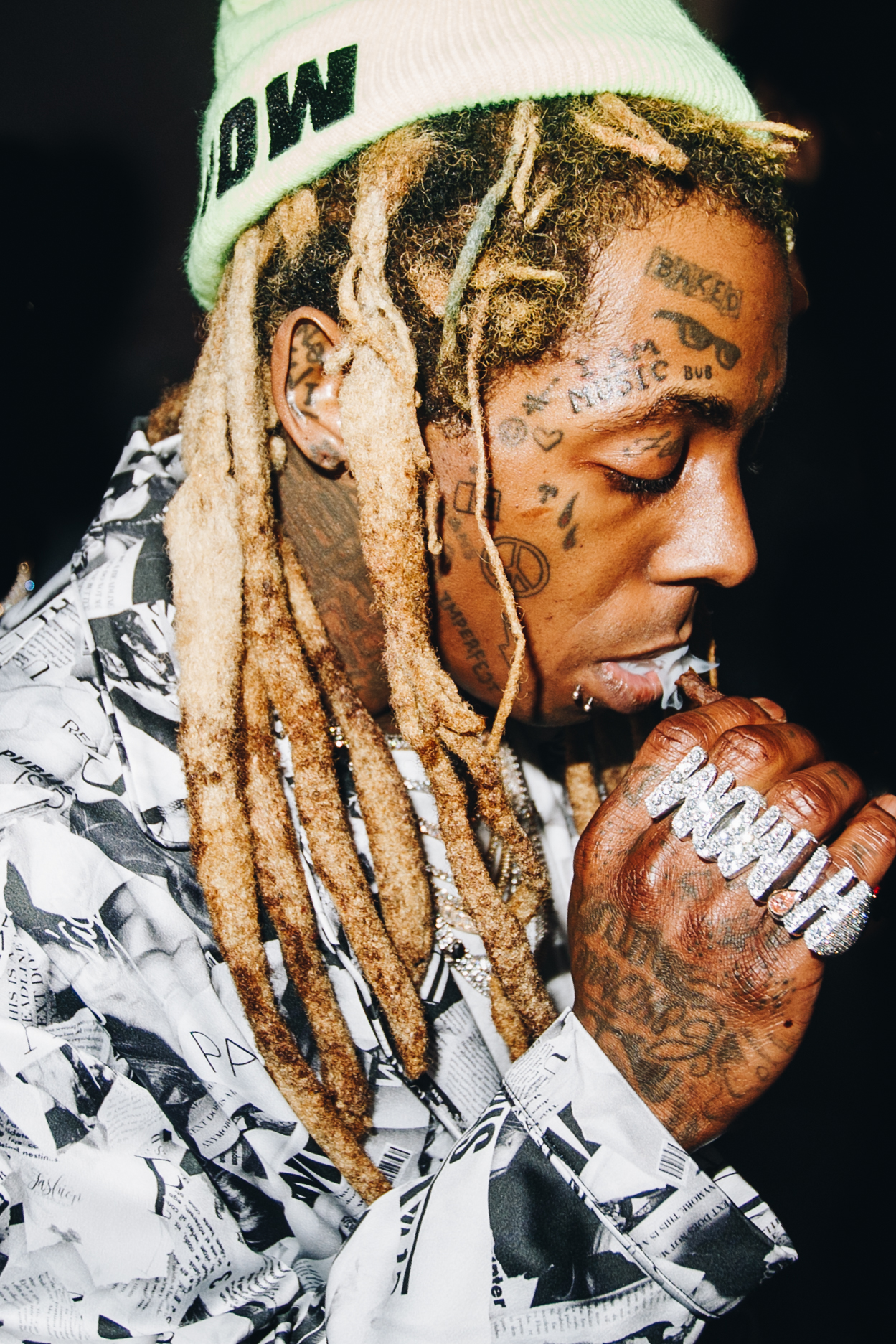
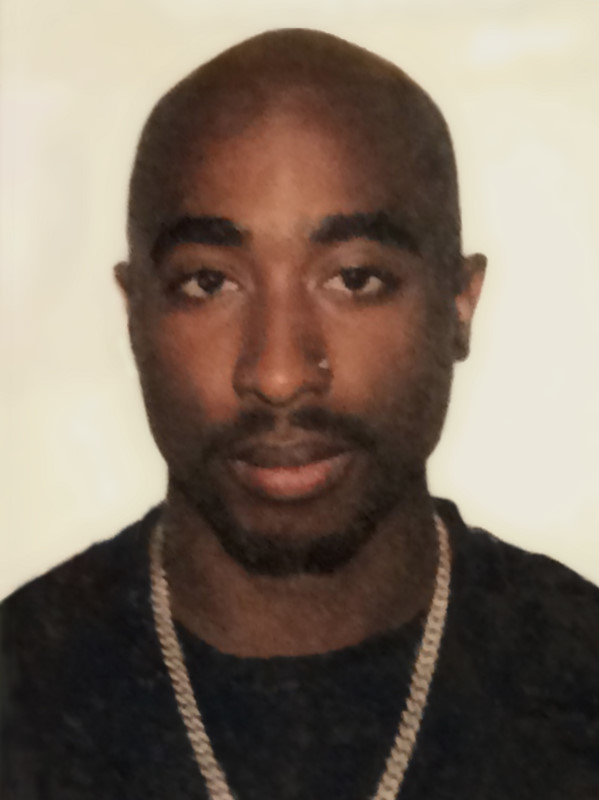
Gaulden's artistry has been compared to Lil Wayne (left) and Tupac Shakur (right).

Gaulden has been compared to several artists throughout his career including Boosie Badazz, Kevin Gates, Lil Wayne, and Tupac Shakur. Despite the several comparisons, Gaulden cited the late Lil Phat as his primary influence in his 2016 interview with The Fader. In December 2022, Gaulden cited Yeat, Young Thug, French Montana, Shy Glizzy, and Soulja Slim as his top five favorite rappers.

=== Musical style ===
Gaulden has been described as "one of the hardest working rappers" in the music industry due to his high musical output. He is known for his consistency in releasing music, with his work ethic described as being of a "rapid fire pace". He has released over twenty-six studio albums, EP's, and mixtapes since 2015. In 2023, he described his tendency to release music constantly as a "disease".

The music is therapy, but I can't stop it when I want, and the lifestyle is just a big distraction from your real purpose.

His musical creativity and lyrical content derive from his own lived experiences, including his criminal history, as well as past relationships. In his music, Gaulden is "brutally honest, which is a result of what he's seen and experienced at a young age". His music is described as "raw" and "spiritual" due to the way he "evokes emotion". Gaulden has been noted for his melodic vocals and "signature aggressive punch and high energy". Gaulden's often praised by music critics for his vulnerability in his music, ranging from the death of his loved ones to broken relationships. Despite being praised for his emotional vulnerability in his music, in Gaulden's 2026 interview with Complex, he revealed that his music isn't as emotional anymore in comparison to when he started rapping as he doesn't "really get too hurt about things no more". Gaulden continued, stating that:

I don't know. I'm just older now, so a lot of things that used to hurt me back then used to make me want to rap. I just don't make that type of music anymore. I don't go that deep because I ain't that hurt anymore. I think I go about things differently.

Gaulden often pays homage to his Louisiana roots in several of his songs. Gaulden's April 2018 track, "Diamond Teeth Samurai" samples Lil Wayne's "Tha Block Is Hot", a southern hip hop track. Songs like "Carter Son", "On My Side", and "Deep Down" incorporates Southern melodies and instrumentals. Gaulden experimented with southern hip hop and hardcore hip hop sounds on his eighteenth solo mixtape, 3800 Degrees (2022), which pays homage to Juvenile's 400 Degreez and Lil Wayne's 500 Degreez. Songs like "Toxic Punk", "2Hoo", and "Bestie" are reminiscent of pop rock and rage songs, further embodied in Gaulden's experimental rage album, I Rest My Case (2023). Gaulden has also experimented with rap rock in songs like "Guitar Hero".

== Philanthropy ==
In 2017, following the release of Gaulden's seventh solo mixtape, AI YoungBoy, he gave away $20,000 in cash in the neighborhood he grew up in. In October 2018, he gave a fan what seemed to be $10,000 for graduating high school in order to push more of his younger fans to stay in school.

In April 2019, Gaulden headed down to Baton Rouge, Louisiana, his hometown, to feed the homeless in the area and set up a shelter for people in need while handing out food to the public. In August 2019, while incarcerated, he and his team funded an annual "Back to School Drive" in order to give children school supplies, backpacks, clothes, alongside other necessities which may be hard for them or their families to acquire. Through a phone call from jail, Gaulden stated, "I hope everybody has fun. Thank you for coming".

In 2020, following the release of his chart-topping sophomore studio album, Top, on behalf of the artist due to his legal circumstances, Gerald Gaulden, Cameron Brown, and Monique, all who have been around Gaulden since his childhood, donated school supplies funded by Gaulden to Capitol Elementary in Sacramento, California.

In November 2022, while on house arrest, Gaulden partnered with the NAACP to donate 500 turkeys to Baton Rouge families in need for Thanksgiving. He also funded a Thanksgiving buffet at Boil & Roux in Baton Rouge during his "Stop The Violence" movement in order to stop violence within black communities.

Aye! Stop the violence. Look at me! I could promise you it's a bigger side of life. Stop the violence. You could be a rich nigga, ya heard me? I could promise you. I ain't gon' tell you what's in my bank account bitch but aye – stop the violence!

In December 2022, Gaulden partnered with his long-time rivals Fredo Bang and TG Kommas alongside the NAACP and Metro Health Education in order to give back to their community in Baton Rouge, Louisiana, to donate thousands of toys to the youth for Christmas. They also donated toys to the children's sector of Baton Rouge's Our Lady of the Lake Regional Medical Center. They also hosted a private dinner to provide food and gifts for people who recently lost their homes in house fires.

In September 2025, ahead of the first date of Gaulden's Make America Slime Again Tour in Dallas, Texas, he donated $50,000 to two non-profit charities, Manifest Freedom and Urban Specialists. Gaulden appeared on WFAA news and said: "You know, a lot of people be getting hurt, so it ain't really cool at this point to me, [...] I just want to help in any way I can".

== Legal issues ==
Despite his success as a musical artist, Gaulden had been involved in numerous criminal run-ins and a civil lawsuit.

=== 2014: Robbery charge and juvenile detention ===
In late 2014, Gaulden was arrested for robbery and sent to a detention center in Tallulah, Louisiana. He was released after serving 6 months.

=== 2016–2017: Attempted murder ===
On November 28, 2016, U.S. Marshals arrested Gaulden before a concert in Austin, Texas, accusing him of jumping out of a vehicle and opening fire on a group of people on a South Baton Rouge street. Gaulden was charged with two counts of attempted murder. Gaulden was in jail until May 2017 for attempted first degree murder. Speaking on his incarceration, he said "I don't think they really target, but if you got a name, they know who you is, you do something, they gonna come get you, and whoever you're with and whatever they do, you're accountable for it just because you got the biggest name. That's how that shit go." Facing two counts of attempted first-degree murder, he pleaded guilty to a reduced charge of aggravated assault with a firearm. On August 22, 2017, he was sentenced to a suspended ten-year prison term and three years of active probation.

=== 2018: Assault, weapons and kidnapping ===
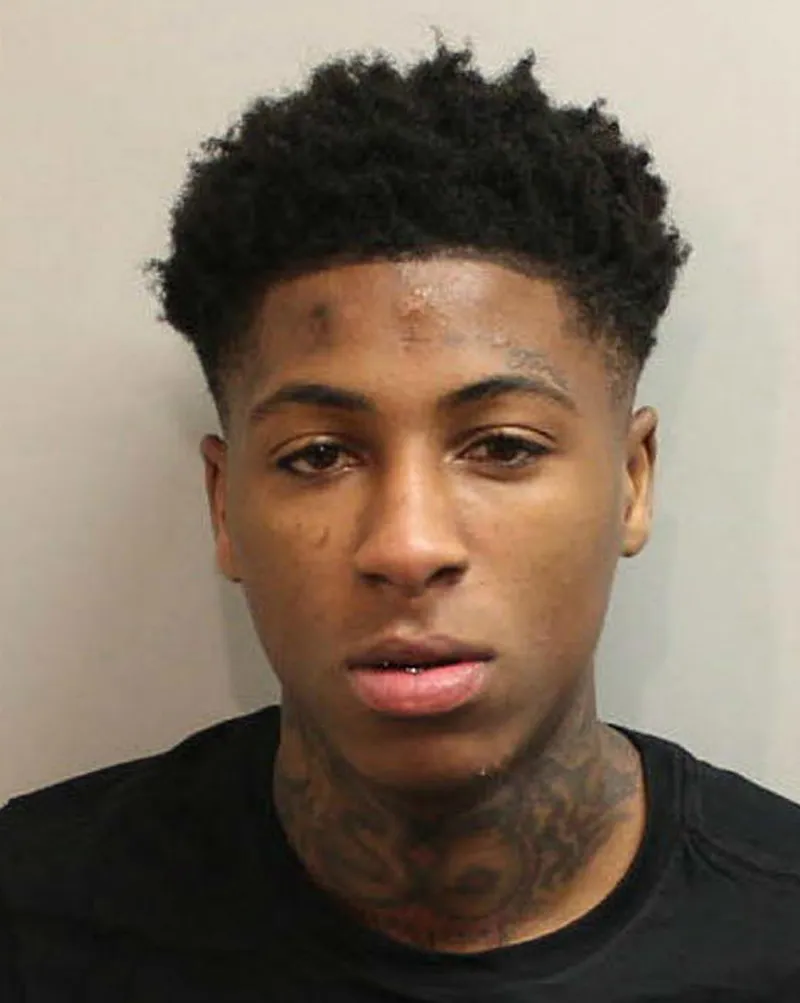
Gaulden's 2018 mugshot

Gaulden was arrested before a concert at The Moon nightclub in Tallahassee on February 25, 2018. Gaulden had a warrant in the state of Georgia for allegedly committing assault, weapons violations and kidnapping. Hotel surveillance footage leaked shortly following his arrest showing Gaulden assaulting his former girlfriend. On March 15, 2018, he was released from jail on $75,000 bail.

=== 2019: Assault and battery lawsuit ===
On March 12, 2019, it was reported that Gaulden and Never Broke Again artist Tyquian "Quando Rondo" Bowman were filed suit by a man claiming to be the rappers' bodyguard, tour manager and/or tour DJ for assault, battery and emotional distress. The lawsuit claims that on December 21, 2018, during a concert in Florence, South Carolina, the two performers were annoyed by a crazed fan resulting in an argument. The claimant states that he, Gaulden, Bowman and members of their entourage were escorted backstage by management, venue owners and concert organizers where he claims to have been assaulted by the two aforementioned. The person, who claimed was confronted by the two defendants, commented that Bowman (although unprovoked) instigated the incident by attempting to force him back onstage to break up the fan craze to secure his team, but after he refused, Bowman and Gaulden immediately assaulted him as he tried to explain to both parties of his deeds. It resulted in the victim sustaining a "cracked tooth, bloody face and injuries to his reputation". Gaulden's attorney stated that he had no prior knowledge of the incident, but would look into the outcome of the lawsuit.

=== 2019: Miami shooting, probation violation, and house arrest ===
While Gaulden was on probation, on May 12, 2019, he was involved in a shooting in Miami in which he returned fire after a shooter in a black Cadillac Escalade opened fire, injuring Gaulden's girlfriend and killing a bystander. Though Gaulden's charges for the shooting itself were dismissed, he was found to be in the company of Ben Fields and Trulondrick "Boomer" Norman, which violated a special condition of his probation; for this violation, the judge ordered him to spend 90 days in jail, banned him from performing for the next 14 months, and sentenced him to house arrest with electronic monitoring for the remainder of his probation.

=== 2019–2020: Probation termination and renewal ===
On December 13, 2019, the judge officially terminated Gaulden's probation for two counts of attempted murder. However, he was sentenced to a year of probation five days later after he pleaded guilty to simple assault in the case involving his ex-girlfriend.

=== 2020: Baton Rouge arrest for federal firearm and drug offenses ===
On September 28, 2020, Gaulden was among sixteen people arrested in Baton Rouge, Louisiana, on various charges, including distribution and manufacturing of drugs and possession of stolen firearms. His lawyer denied any guilt, stating "There was no indication that he had any guns or drugs on him at the time of the arrest".

=== 2021–2022: California federal firearm charge and Baton Rouge federal firearm and drug charge ===
On March 22, 2021, Gaulden was arrested by federal agents in Los Angeles executing a federal warrant stemming from his September 2020 arrest in Baton Rouge. Officers attempted to stop a vehicle with Gaulden in it to serve the warrant when Gaulden took off on foot. After a search that involved using a police dog, Gaulden was found and booked on federal firearms charges. On October 26, 2021, he was released from jail on a $1.5 million bail.

On February 24, 2022, following Gaulden's September 2020 Baton Rouge arrest in the process of recording a music video, Gaulden's team filed a motion to suppress the firearm obtained during the arrest alongside the video and photo evidence via an SD card from the video shoot for "Chopper City". On March 2, 2022, the motion to suppress the video evidence was granted, however, the motion to suppress the firearm was denied. Following Gaulden's win, a trial date was set for May 16, 2022, however, it was later pushed back due to unforeseeable actions. In June 2022, Gaulden's team won a pre-trial motion as his team filed for a removal of evidence due to prosecutorial misconduct.

During the trial for Gaulden's California federal firearm charge, on July 12, 2022, the prosecution's motion for allowing lyrics from Gaulden's "Life Support" and "Gunsmoke", in both of which Gaulden raps about FN Herstals, in the trial against him was denied. On July 15, 2022, Gaulden was found not guilty of his federal firearms charges from California, due to a lack of evidence linking him to intentionally possessing the weapons found.

=== 2023–2024: Baton Rouge federal firearm charge ===
On March 9, 2023, regarding Gaulden's Baton Rouge federal firearm charge, the prosecution team filed a motion to challenge Gaulden's motion to suppress the video and photo evidence – which they won in March 2022. It was noted that the three-judge panel would come to a decision in the following weeks.

On March 15, 2023, it was announced that Judge Shelly Dick lifted restrictions from Gaulden's house arrest. In the report, two conditions were removed. Firstly, Gaulden would be allowed to have more than three visitors at a time without a curfew restriction.

After the prosecution team in Gaulden's Baton Rouge case filed a motion to challenge his to suppress the video and photo evidence, in July 2023, Gaulden's team re-filed with the United States courts of appeals, however, he lost the appeal. In October 2023, regarding Gaulden's Baton Rouge federal firearm charge, after Gaulden's team challenged the lost appeal, the United States Court of Appeals for the Fifth Circuit reversed their decision, allowing the prosecution to use the evidence.

In November 2023, Gaulden's defense filed a motion in order to amend his pre-trial conditions due to police corruption. Later that month, the court denied Gaulden's motion to ease his house arrest limitations due to his diminishing mental health alongside declining music sales. Assistant US attorney William K. Morris stated that Gaulden's "current conditions of pre-trial release prohibit him from seeking and obtaining mental health treatment". On December 19, 2023, Billboard announced that Judge Shelly Dick denied Gaulden's request to obtain more recording studio access, however, she allowed the rapper to get better medical treatment.

On March 13, 2024, a Utah federal court held up the case, due to Gaulden's attorney filing for Second Amendment rights. The following day, one count of possession of a firearm by a convicted felon was dismissed.

The trial was to begin on July 15, 2024, but was moved up to July 25, 2024. On August 16, 2024, it was reported that Gaulden entered a guilty plea in the federal firearm case. Gaulden's court proceedings would be moved from Louisiana to Utah due to Gaulden's pending charges in Utah. On May 28, 2025, Donald Trump signed a presidential pardon for Gaulden.

=== 2024–2025: Utah arrest for drug and fraud charges ===
On March 1, 2024, Gaulden was alleged by Utah state officials to have violated "pre-trial conditions" because of his drug use. On April 17, 2024, he was arrested for charges ranging from continuous activity stemming from possession of controlled substances to possession of a deadly (dangerous) weapon and identity fraud.

The charges allege that Gaulden was running a "prescription fraud ring", by using a fake identity and imitating a pharmacy customer's voice via cell phone to purchase over-the-counter prescription drugs to fuel his codeine binge. His house arrest was revoked soon after and he was extradited to Louisiana, ordered to remain in a Baton Rouge prison, awaiting trial without bail. On May 9, 2024, Gaulden appeared in a Cache County, Utah, court for a bond hearing following his arrest in April. Gaulden appeared before Judge Spencer D. Walsh, and his bond was set at $100,000.

I want to thank President Trump for granting me a pardon and giving me the opportunity to keep building – as a man, as a father, and as an artist. This moment means a lot. It opens the door to a future I've worked hard for and I am fully prepared to step into this.

— Gaulden, on receiving a presidential pardon

Following the transfer of Gaulden's Baton Rouge federal firearm charge from Louisiana to Utah after Gaulden entered a guilty plea, on August 19, 2024, prosecutors in Utah filed a federal firearm charge against Gaulden, stemming from his April 2024 arrest. Prosecutors claimed that Gaulden was in possession of an illegally obtained firearm while on house arrest.

On September 9, Gaulden's attorney, Bradford Cohen announced that Gaulden had accepted a global plea encompassing his current charges in Louisiana and Utah. On November 18, Gaulden entered a guilty plea regarding his drug and fraud charges in Utah. He pleaded guilty to two counts of third-degree felony identity fraud, two counts of third-degree felony forgery, and six counts of misdemeanor unlawful pharmacy conduct and entered a no contest plea for his remaining 36 charges. Gaulden's four felonies were reduced to Class A Misdemeanors. On December 10, Gaulden was officially sentenced to 23 months in prison followed by 60 months of probation following his release, and an additional $25,000 fine.

In January 2025, it was revealed that Gaulden would be released on July 27 of the same year, however, it was later pushed forward to April 26. On March 24, 2025, he was released from FCI Talladega. The following day, it was revealed that Gaulden had been transferred to RRM Phoenix, a halfway house in Phoenix, Arizona, where he has a curfew of 30 days before being released on probation. Almost two months after Gaulden's release in April 2025, on May 29, he was granted a presidential pardon by Donald Trump. Following the announcement, Gaulden took to his Instagram to thank his lawyers and Trump for the pardon, sharing a message.

=== 2025: Traffic violation and illicit drug discovery ===
On December 31, 2025, months after Gaulden received a presidential pardon, he was pulled over on Interstate 15 in Utah by the Utah Highway Patrol for a traffic violation. After being pulled over, the vehicle was searched, and illicit drugs and large amounts of cash were found. Despite Gaulden being in the vehicle, the male driver and a female passenger claimed ownership of the drugs found inside.

== Feuds ==
=== King Von and Lil Durk ===
From 2018 to 2020, Gaulden and Chicago rapper King Von – a signee of Lil Durk's imprint Only The Family – began to diss each other through social media and their music, in what was initially taken as a joke. In particular, Von who made several videos mocking viral clips of Gaulden as Von noted that Gaulden fakes in his music: "the fuck YoungBoy talking about on this song, bruh? He's talking crazy, he ain't even like that. I'm on his ass now. You got caps in yo raps." On November 6, 2020, King Von was shot and killed following an altercation with the Never Broke Again affiliate Quando Rondo.

In 2022, following Von's death, and Gaulden's release from jail, Gaulden released "Bring the Hook", the lead single from his mixtape Colors. In the track, Gaulden sent an obvious diss toward King Von and rappers from O'Block in Chicago as he rapped: "Nigga, this that Squid Game, O-Block pack get rolled up / Murder what they told us, Atlanta boy get fold up". The song's release sparked a feud between Gaulden and Von's close friend Lil Durk, which lead to the release of "Ahhh Ha", the lead single from Durk's 7220. The song featured several subtle disses from Durk to Gaulden. In the track, Durk took several shots against Gaulden's ex-girlfriend Jania Meshell, suggesting she had relations with the late King Von.

On the same day, Gaulden released "I Hate YoungBoy" which appeared on his fourth studio album The Last Slimeto. In the song, Gaulden took shots at Durk's fiancé India Royale, Gucci Mane, Lil Baby, Boosie Badazz, Durk's late cousin OTF Nunu, and Durk himself. He also dissed Apple Music for promoting the Chicago native Lil Durk.

On May 4, 2023, media personality Akademiks stated that Gaulden and Durk had reconciled, but on May 8, Gaulden dissed both Durk and Akademiks on Twitter. On the same day, he announced a new mixtape titled Richest Opp and its release date of May 12, 2023, the same release date as Lil Durk's album Almost Healed.

=== NLE Choppa ===
In the midst of Gaulden's feud with Lil Durk, Gaulden released the track "Know Like I Know". It contained several disses towards NLE Choppa after he allegedly picked Durk's side in their beef, after NLE responded negatively to a Tweet from a King Von affiliate, Lil Reese which stated: "That ain't no demon time he just rapping like the rest of these rappers all rap", under which NLE responded, "I stamp that".

In the track, Gaulden took several subtle disses towards NLE where he rapped: "I bet your momma would be destroyed, nigga, when we send your stupid ass to God for makin' statements/ Choosin' sides about my beef with them lil boys. I can say I saw it, you can say I was your favorite, nigga/ Better stay up in your place bitch, fuck around get your face split" and "I don't give a fuck how you treat your body, give a fuck bout your cleaning". Gaulden also referenced The Real Blasian, who is both the ex-girlfriends of Gaulden and NLE, rapping: "Nigga better ask Blasian about me/ How we catch 'em bad and take his shit/ Leave 'em stripped, the police think we raped the bitch/ Nigga better not play with this".

While Gaulden's feud with Choppa died down, in October 2025, Choppa dropped "KO", a diss track against Gaulden, under the stage name, NLE the Great. In the track, Choppa addressed Gaulden's impact on the youth while dubbing him the Devil's "king". In the single's cover art, Choppa is depicted holding Gaulden's severed head. In mid-November, Gaulden dropped his "Zero IQ Freestyle". On the track, Gaulden appeared to send shots towards Choppa: "'Respond to him,' he ain't never ran nothin' down, bitch, I said, 'No'". Following Gaulden's subliminal response to Choppa, in late November, Choppa dropped, "Hello Revenge", dubbed as a "YoungBoy Diss", yet to receive a response from Gaulden.

=== Gucci Mane ===
Following Gaulden's infamous "I Hate YoungBoy" in which he rapped: "Used to fuck with Gucci 'til I seen he like them pussy niggas" after Gucci's collaboration with Lil Durk, "Rumors", Gucci responded with "Publicity Stunt", in which he dissed Gaulden several times. In the track, Gucci responded to Gaulden as he rapped: "Why you diss me for publicity nigga?/ Is you in the streets or an industry nigga?", after Gaulden had made it clear he does not appreciate the music industry. In the song's outro, Gucci interpolated Gaulden's viral hit "Make No Sense" in which Gaulden rapped: "I feel like I'm Gucci Mane in 2006", where Gucci switched it up, rapping: "I thought you felt like Gucci Mane in 2006".

=== Joe Budden ===
In December 2023, on Joe Budden's podcast, Budden brought up Gaulden in his list of topics, stating that his music is bad:

Uh, what else do I have written down here... You ready to tell the truth about NBA YoungBoy?' Am I ready to do this? That nigga is trash. He's horrible. He is horrible, he is horrible, he is really, really, really, really, really bad. I don't know him as a person, I'm only speaking about music. He is really, really, really bad. And that thing happened with him. When he was out, the label pushed a button and did some YouTube shit. All the little kids had to just come to the fucking gathering and tell you about NBA YoungBoy's views and how great he is and how awesome he is and how amazing he's doing.

Budden criticizing Gaulden sparked a response from him through the Never Broke Again, LLC Instagram page, in which Gaulden made a story dissing Budden in which he noted that his mixtape Decided 2 is still in the Apple Music top ten US albums chart, "The last thing I dropped was Decided 2, and my album is still in the top 10 [on Apple Music] pussy ass nigga. Don't speak on me, I don't play that shit. Don't rat on me either, you pussy ass bitch". Label head Birdman also responded to Budden, noting that he is not wise for dissing Gaulden. Budden later doubled-down on his diss, stating that he is "way bigger" than Gaulden:

I just wanna say, I'm way bigger than him. Stop this. Dawg, you young idiots get fooled by these label metrics and these digital tricks. Would you like me to read you the numbers on YoungBoy's last six projects? Alright. I mean, I don't want to. I didn't think I had to do this. ‘Cause I'm sure someone here is recording.[...] The point is, you doing a lot for somebody that don't sell more than 60,000 records. Stop it. Enough of young people just saying stupid shit in Hip Hop. We get it, you like who you like, awesome. But it's not this dominant force that you niggas keep tryna make it out to be.

Days later, Joe Budden apologized to Gaulden, stating that there was a much better way to articulate his opinions. Gaulden later responded to Budden's apology, claiming that the entire controversy was a publicity stunt, "Joe Budden, I love you, bruh. They don't understand our plot twist. It was strictly finna do an interview after this. Tell ’em don't take us too serious. Everything entertainment, man".

=== Charlamagne tha God ===
On January 8, 2024, Gaulden appeared in an interview, which he spoke about not being "too big" on the idea of fatherhood, despite having several children. Gaulden's comments sparked a response from The Breakfast Club co-host, Charlamagne tha God, who criticized Gaulden's views on fatherhood, calling him the "Donkey of the Day". Following this, Gaulden released a diss track towards Charlamagne, titled "Act a Donkey" in which he invited him to his house in Utah to resolve their dispute in a threatening manner. Charlamagne responded to the track, noting that he would not travel to Gaulden's home.

== Business ventures ==
=== Never Broke Again ===
Following Gaulden's signing with Atlantic Records in 2017, his music began to be released under Atlantic and Never Broke Again, a record label founded by Gaulden, Rodrick "OG 3Three" Jeanpierre, and Kyle "Montana" Claiborne. Gaulden aimed to guide his friends into the music industry and give upcoming artists a platform to share their music. Never Broke Again's music was originally distributed through UnitedMasters. On September 8, 2021, Never Broke Again signed a global joint venture deal with Motown, to distribute their music and release compilation albums under the joint venture. Despite Gaulden being a co-founder and the face of the label, it's run by Kyle "Montana" Clairborne. When asked about the inspiration behind the label, Gaulden noted, "I felt like I had a responsibility to my artists to make sure to find the right partner for my label. I'm looking forward working with Ethiopia, Kenoe[,] and Motown Records."

The label has been home to several artists such as YoungBoy Never Broke Again, Quando Rondo, and NoCap, and record producers and engineers such as Jason "Cheese" Goldberg and Khris James.

=== Alleged Roc-A-Fella Records purchase ===
On September 18, 2025, American rapper and ex-Roc-A-Fella Records signee, Cam'ron revealed that Gaulden made an offer to purchase Damon Dash's, the co-founder of the label and the minority owner, 33.3% stake in the label. He further revealed that after Mase offered $1 million, Dash rejected the deal due to Gaulden offering double. The deal fell through after Dash received another offer for over $6 million.

=== Amp talk show ===
On December 8, 2022, Gaulden signed a deal with Amazon's Amp. Following the announcement of the partnership, each Friday Gaulden hosted the radio show at 8 PM Central Time. Each episode featured popular guests and celebrities such as Blueface, Rich the Kid, and Ja Morant. Gaulden interviewed his guests following their arrival. Despite Ja being announced as an official guest, the show was canceled on the same night and stopped airing since. On October 4, 2023, Amp was shut down and all of its content, including Gaulden's radio show, was discarded from Amazon.

=== Fashion ===
In 2020, Gaulden collaborated with ASAP Bari's popular streetwear brand, VLONE to bundle with his newest studio album at the time, Top.

In July 2023, Gaulden released his own sneaker chain under his Never Broke Again Clothing as the "Grave Digger". This was followed by a collaboration with Supreme in which he was the face of the Fall/Winter 2023 Series. Ahead of Gaulden's 21st solo mixtape, Decided 2, released on November 10, 2023, Gaulden announced his collaboration with the popular streetwear brand, Guapi. The mixtape's 16th cut titled "Guapi" is an ode to the brand.

In January 2026, upon the release of his ninth studio album, Slime Cry, Gaulden partnered up with Complex to release his own limited edition GAS Trading Cards, and an exclusive clothing collaboration with A Bathing Ape.

== Personal life ==
In October 2021, after being released on house arrest from Baton Rouge, Gaulden moved to Utah with his then-girlfriend, Jazlyn Mychelle Hayes. In April 2022, Gaulden purchased an 8,800 square-foot (817 m2) luxury mansion in Millcreek, Utah for about $5.4 million. In late 2023, Gaulden purchased another home in Huntsville, Utah, atop several acres of land, which he dubs "Grave Digger Mountain". In March 2024, Gaulden listed the property in Milcreek for sale at $5.5 million. Despite the property in Milcreek being listed, Gaulden moved back into it following his release from prison in April 2025.

In August 2026, Gaulden announced he had relocated to South Korea and doesn't plan on moving back to the US, noting the peaceful and clean lifestyle overseas.

=== Family and relationships ===
At 27 years old, Gaulden is the confirmed father of eleven children, with eight different women. There are unconfirmed rumors of an additional two children with two other women. In July 2016, Gaulden's then-girlfriend Nisha Keller gave birth to his first son. In the same month, Starr Dejanee gave birth to his second son. In 2018, it was revealed that Gaulden was not his biological father. However, he continued to raise him.

In March 2017, Trinia Loveless gave birth to his third son. In July 2017, Dejanee gave birth to Gaulden's fourth son. In February 2019, Jania Meshell gave birth to his fifth son after being in an on-and-off relationship with her since 2017. Gaulden and Keller welcomed their second child four years after welcoming their first son. His first daughter was born in June 2020. In November 2020, Gaulden welcomed his second daughter with Drea Symone. In August 2020, Jazlyn Mychelle Hayes gave birth to Gaulden's third daughter.

In January 2021, Yaya Mayweather gave birth to his son. In September 2022, he and Hayes welcomed their second child and Gaulden's seventh son. Two of his sons, appeared in the video for his single, "Kacey Talk". In February 2026, Hayes gave birth to their third child together, a daughter.

On January 7, 2023, Gaulden married Jazlyn Michelle Hayes while on house arrest.

=== Health problems ===
While on house arrest in 2023, Gaulden spoke publicly about his heavy drug use to cope with depression and anxiety, stating that he takes approximately 20 Xanax pills a day. In November 2023, Gaulden's lawyers filled a motion to make amendments to his house arrest conditions due to a decline in his mental health. In a December 2023 interview, Gaulden revealed that he had entered a rehabilitation program.

In February 2024, Gaulden shared a post on Instagram that pictured him on the floor with alprazolam pills and a cup of lean, creating concerns on the rapper's health. In August 2026, during an interview on Funny Marco's Open Thoughts podcast, Gaulden revealed that a doctor told him the left side of his heart was swollen. Despite this, he admitted that he kept performing and finished his tour without telling anyone. He stated that music is no longer his primary focus and he only plans to release 1–2 more albums.

=== Faith and beliefs ===
On August 8, 2018, Gaulden announced via social media that he converted to Islam, showing his then-girlfriend wearing a burqa. However, since his move to Utah in 2021, Gaulden has been visited by missionaries of the Church of Jesus Christ of Latter-day Saints, and he has stated his intention to be baptized into the church once his ankle monitor is removed. In a 2023 interview with DJ Bootleg Kev, Gaulden re-affirmed his commitment to Mormonism and compared himself to Porter Rockwell.

== Discography ==
Studio albums

- Until Death Call My Name (2018)
- Top (2020)
- Sincerely, Kentrell (2021)
- The Last Slimeto (2022)
- I Rest My Case (2023)
- Don't Try This at Home (2023)
- I Just Got a Lot on My Shoulders (2024)
- MASA (2025)
- Slime Cry (2026)

== Filmography ==
- American YoungBoy (2026; as himself)

== Tours ==
=== Headlining ===
- AI YoungBoy Tour (2017)
- Until Death Call My Name Tour (2018)
- Still Flexin, Still Steppin Tour (2020)
- Make America Slime Again Tour (2025)

=== Supporting ===
- Numb The Pain Tour (21 Savage) (2017)

== Awards and nominations ==
In September 2025, Gaulden was awarded the key to Kansas City by mayor Quinton Lucas, alongside his own holiday on September 21.

Award	Year	Recipient(s) and nominee(s)	Category	Result	Ref.
ASCAP Rhythm & Soul Music Awards	2021	"Bandit" (with Juice WRLD) (only on behalf of Gaulden himself)	Winning Rap Songs	Won	
BET Hip Hop Awards	2019	"I Am Who They Say I Am" (with Kevin Gates and Quando Rondo)	Best Impact Track	Nominated	
BET Hip Hop Awards	2022	Birdman & YoungBoy Never Broke Again	Best Duo/Group	Nominated	
BET Hip Hop Awards	2022	DaBaby & YoungBoy Never Broke Again	Best Duo/Group	Nominated	
BMI R&B/Hip-Hop Awards	2021	"Bandit" (with Juice WRLD) (only on behalf of Juice WRLD (posthumously) and Nick Mira)	Most Performed R&B/Hip-Hop Songs	Won	
Grammy Awards	2022	"WusYaName" (with Tyler, the Creator and Ty Dolla Sign)	Best Melodic Rap Performance	Nominated	
XXL Awards	2023	Himself	The People's Champ	Won	

== See also ==
- List of highest-certified music artists in the United States
- List of people granted executive clemency in the second Trump presidency
