= Rumors (Gucci Mane song) =

2022 single by Gucci Mane featuring Lil Durk

Single by Gucci Mane featuring Lil Durk

from the album So Icy Gang: The ReUp
- Released: January 25, 2022
- Length: 3:06
- Label: Atlantic; 1017
- Songwriters: Radric Davis; Durk Banks; Brytavious Chambers; Demetrius Moore
- Producers: Tay Keith; DJ Meech

Gucci Mane singles chronology
"2Fast!" (2021)	"Rumors" (2022)	"Publicity Stunt" (2022)

Lil Durk singles chronology
"Power Powder Respect" (2022)	"Rumors" (2022)	"Ikea Rug" (2022)

Music video
- "Rumors" on YouTube

"Rumors" is a song by American rapper Gucci Mane featuring fellow American rapper Lil Durk. It was released through Atlantic and 1017 Records on January 25, 2022 as the lead single to his 2022 deluxe compilation album So Icy Gang: The ReUp. The artists wrote the song with producers Tay Keith and DJ Meech. Gucci announced the song and its release date with a preview of it and its accompanying music video on January 24, 2022, the day before the song was released, referring to it as "a street smash". The two artists have previously collaborated on Gucci's 2014 song, "Wit Us", which is a remix of Durk's 2014 song, "War Wit Us".

== Composition and lyrics ==
Lyrically, "Rumors" sees both Mane and Durk dismissing any rumors that have been made against them. Mane received attention for dissing Pookie Loc, a friend of American rapper Jeezy. Rapper 50 Cent commented about the diss on Instagram.

== Music video ==
The official music video for "Rumors", directed by Jerry Sanchez, was released alongside the song on January 25, 2022. The video sees Mane and Durk rapping in a parking lot and hanging out with friends.

== Personnel ==
Credits adapted from Tidal.

- Gucci Mane – lead vocals, songwriting
- Lil Durk – featured vocals, songwriting
- Tay Keith – production, songwriting
- DJ Meech – production, songwriting
- Eddie "eMIX" Hernandez – mixing
- Amani "A $" Hernandez – mixing assistance
- Colin Leonard – mastering

== Charts ==
Chart performance for "Rumors"
Chart (2022)	Peak position
Canada Hot 100 (Billboard)	70
Global 200 (Billboard)	100
US Billboard Hot 100	51
US Hot R&B/Hip-Hop Songs (Billboard)	11
US Rhythmic Airplay (Billboard)	23

== Certifications ==
Region	Certification	Certified units/sales
United States (RIAA)	Platinum	1,000,000^{‡}
^{‡} Sales+streaming figures based on certification alone.

== Release history ==
Release history for "Rumors"
Region	Date	Format	Label	Ref.
Various	January 25, 2022	Digital download; streaming	Atlantic	
United States	February 8, 2022	Rhythmic contemporary	Atlantic	
United States	February 8, 2022	Urban contemporary radio	Atlantic	
