= YoungBoy Never Broke Again discography =

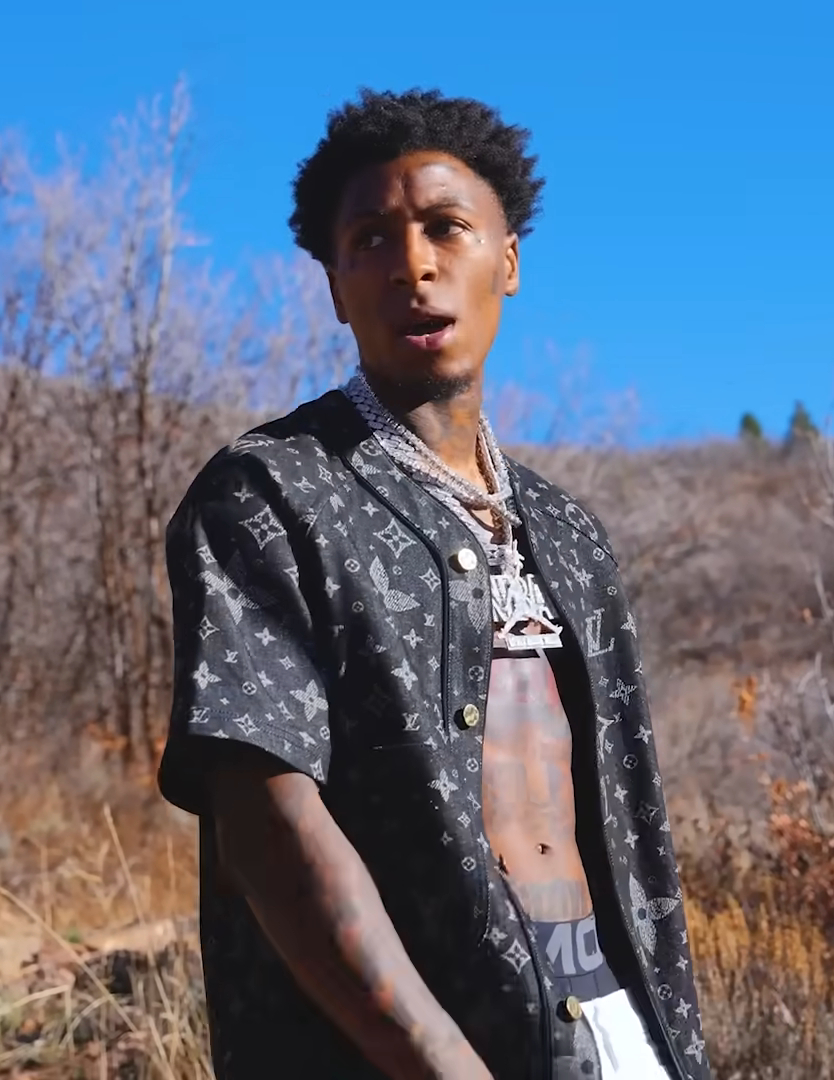
- YoungBoy Never Broke Again in 2023
- Studio albums: 9
- EPs: 3
- Compilation albums: 4
- Singles: 102
- Mixtapes: 26

The discography of American YoungBoy Never Broke Again consists of nine studio albums, four compilation albums, 26 mixtapes (including six collaborative mixtapes), three extended plays, and 102 singles (including twenty-three as a featured artist). His music has been released on record labels 101 Distribution, Atlantic Records, and Motown Records, along with subsidiaries Never Broke Again and Artist Partner Group. With over 80 million digital units sold in the United States, he is among the highest certified artists in the United States. YoungBoy has achieved four number-one albums on the Billboard 200 and one top-ten hit on the Billboard Hot 100. In 2022, YoungBoy received a plaque from the Recording Industry Association of America which reads "100 RIAA Gold/Platinum Certifications", making him the youngest artist to receive this at just 22 years old. He is also the youngest artist in history to chart 100 songs on the Billboard Hot 100 at just 23 years old.

After signing with Atlantic Records in 2017, YoungBoy released his seventh mixtape, AI YoungBoy, his first appearance on the Billboard 200 at number 24. The mixtape was later certified platinum by the Recording Industry Association of America (RIAA). AI YoungBoy was preceded by two singles, "Untouchable" and "No Smoke". These singles peaked at numbers 95 and 61 on the US Billboard Hot 100, respectively, and became certified 2× Platinum and 3× Platinum by the Recording Industry Association of America (RIAA). In April 2018, YoungBoy released his debut studio album, Until Death Call My Name. The album debuted within the top 10 of the Billboard 200, and later became certified 2× platinum by the RIAA. The album included two of YoungBoy's most renowned singles, "Outside Today" and "Diamond Teeth Samurai", peaking at number 31 and 59 on the Billboard Hot 100, and were certified 4× platinum and platinum by the RIAA.

In October 2019, YoungBoy teamed up with the late Juice Wrld for the single "Bandit" which debuted at number 10 on the Billboard Hot 100. It became YoungBoy's highest-charting single and one of his most popular, resulting in it being certified 6× platinum by the RIAA, platinum in Australia and platinum in the United Kingdom. Just weeks later, YoungBoy released his twelfth mixtape, AI YoungBoy 2, the sequel to AI YoungBoy. It debuted atop the Billboard 200, selling 110,000 units in its first week. It also debuted within the top 20 in Canada. The album produced YoungBoy's most notable single, "Make No Sense" which peaked at number 57 on the Billboard Hot 100 and was certified 2× platinum by the RIAA. The mixtape itself was certified 2× platinum by the RIAA, while all songs are certified gold or higher. In February 2020, YoungBoy released his thirteenth mixtape, Still Flexin, Still Steppin who debuted at number 2 on the Billboard 200, and was later certified platinum by the RIAA. Just two months later, in April 2020, YoungBoy released his fourteenth mixtape, 38 Baby 2, a sequel to his classic mixtape, 38 Baby. The mixtape debuted atop the Billboard 200, marking YoungBoy's second United States number-one album. Later that year, in September 2020, YoungBoy released his sophomore studio album, Top. The album debuted at the number 1 position on the Billboard 200, and was certified 2× platinum by the RIAA. The album was preceded by the single "Kacey Talk" which peaked at number 50 on the Billboard Hot 100, and was certified 5× platinum by the RIAA.

YoungBoy's third studio album, Sincerely, Kentrell was released in September 2021 while YoungBoy was incarcerated. It debuted atop the Billboard 200 charts. YoungBoy became the third artist in history to receive a number-one album from jail, besides 2Pac and Lil Wayne. The album was preceded by five singles, including "Nevada" and "Life Support", both peaking at number 58 and 48 on the Billboard Hot 100, and were certified platinum and gold by the RIAA. Following YoungBoy's release from jail in October 2021, he released three mixtapes, From the Bayou with Birdman in December 2021, Colors in January 2022 which debuted at number 2 on the Billboard 200, and Better than You with DaBaby. These were later followed by YoungBoy's fourth studio album, The Last Slimeto which debuted at number 2 on the Billboard 200. The album was certified gold by the RIAA in just a month of its release. It produced one of YoungBoy's most notable singles of 2022, "Vette Motors". Following the release, YoungBoy released four full-length projects, Realer 2, peaking at number 6 on the Billboard 200, 3800 Degrees, peaking at number 12 on the Billboard 200, Ma' I Got A Family, peaking at number 7 on the Billboard 200, and Lost Files, a compilation project, peaking at number 45 on the Billboard 200.

In 2023, YoungBoy signed a new record deal with Motown Records, which is estimated to be one of the largest music deals in history at over $60 million. Following this deal, YoungBoy released his fifth studio album, I Rest My Case which debuted at number 9 on the Billboard 200. In April 2023, YoungBoy released his sixth studio album, Don't Try This at Home which debuted at number 5 on the Billboard 200. The album produced YoungBoys hundredth Billboard Hot 100 hit, "Big Truck". Just weeks following this release, YoungBoy released his twentieth solo mixtape, Richest Opp following his back and forth with Lil Durk. The mixtape was released to challenge Durk's Almost Healed which was pushed back due to its release. It debuted at number 4 on the Billboard 200, producing one of YoungBoy's biggest hits in 2023, "Bitch Let's Do It" which peaked at number 62 on the Billboard Hot 100. Gaulden later released the mixtape, Decided 2 in November of that year, peaking at number 17 on the Billboard 200. In April 2024, Gaulden was arrested for violating his house arrest conditions, along with several other charges, preventing him from releasing music; it also resulted in much of his music and music videos leaking. In December 2025, while incarcerated, Gaulden released his already-leaked, seventh studio album, I Just Got a Lot on My Shoulders which peaked at number 153 on the Billboard 200, marking his lowest entry since Ain't Too Long (2017). In March 2025, while still incarcerated, gaulden released the compilation album, More Leaks. Following Gaulden's release and presidential pardon later in the year, he released his eighth studio album, MASA which peaked at number 6 on the Billboard 200. Months after his release, following the popularity of his Make America Slime Again Tour, the promotional single, released in May, "Shot Callin" peaked at number 43 on the Billboard Hot 100, before the release of "What You Is" which peaked at number 75 on the Billboard Hot 100.

Gaulden has also been featured on several songs that have received mainstream success. In 2017, he appeared on A Boogie wit da Hoodie's "Beast Mode" which peaked at number 82 on the Billboard Hot 100. In 2018, he appeared on Lil Yachty's "NBAYoungBoat" which peaked at number 63 on the Hot 100. In 2020, he appeared on "Jump", the eighth track from DaBaby's Blame It on Baby (2020), peaking at number 17 on the Hot 100; "Need It", the lead single for the Migos' fourth album, Culture III (2021), peaking at number 62 on the Hot 100; "Trillionaire" with Future, which peaked at 34 on the Hot 100; and "Tragic", the third cut of The Kid Laroi's F*ck Love (Savage) Deluxe (2020), peaking at number 76 on the Hot 100. In 2021, Gaulden appeared alongside Ty Dolla Sign on "WusYaName", the second single to Tyler, the Creator's Call Me If You Get Lost (2021). The track debuted and peaked at number 14 on the Hot 100 and garnered Gaulden a nomination at the 64th Grammy Awards for Best Melodic Rap Performance. In 2022, he appeared on "To the Bone", the sixth cut of Quavo and Takeoff's collaborative album, Only Built for Infinity Links (2022), which peaked at number 83 on the Hot 100. Gaulden's 2023 appearance on Yeat's "Shmunk" also peaked at number 83 on the chart.

== Albums ==
=== Studio albums ===
List of studio albums, with selected chart positions, sales figures and certifications
Title	Album details	Peak chart positions									Sales (Note: Sales figures for albums, EPs, and singles are pure sales that do not take equivalent units into account.)	Certifications
Title	Album details	US	US R&B/HH	US Rap	BEL	CAN	NLD	FRA	NOR	UK	Sales	Certifications
Until Death Call My Name	Released: April 27, 2018; Label: Never Broke Again, APG, Atlantic; Format: Digital download, streaming	7	5	4	—	38	151	—	—	—	US: 17,000 (Note: In 2018 the album sold 17,000 pure copies)	RIAA: 2× Platinum
Top	Released: September 11, 2020; Label: Never Broke Again, APG, Atlantic; Format: CD (Limited), LP, digital download, streaming	1	1	1	167	4	50	146	—	62		RIAA: 2× Platinum
Sincerely, Kentrell	Released: September 24, 2021; Labels: Never Broke Again, Atlantic; Format: CD, LP, digital download, streaming	1	1	1	154	8	46	168	39	47	US: 14,061 (Note: In 2021 the album sold 14,061 pure copies)	RIAA: Platinum
The Last Slimeto	Released: August 5, 2022; Label: Never Broke Again, Atlantic; Formats: CD, LP, digital download, streaming	2	1	1	—	12	92	—	—	87	US: 6,000 (Note: In 2022 the album sold 6,000 pure copies)	RIAA: Platinum
I Rest My Case	Released: January 6, 2023; Label: Never Broke Again, Motown; Formats: Digital download, streaming	9	5	4	—	—	—	—	—	—		
Don't Try This at Home	Released: April 21, 2023; Label: Never Broke Again, Motown; Formats: Digital download, streaming	5	1	2	—	92	—	—	—	—		
I Just Got a Lot on My Shoulders	Released: December 6, 2024; Label: Never Broke Again, Motown; Formats: Digital download, streaming	159	—	—	—	—	—	—	—	—		
MASA	Released: July 25, 2025; Label: Never Broke Again, Motown; Formats: Digital download, streaming	6	3	2	—	—	—	—	—	—		
Slime Cry	Released: January 16, 2026; Label: Never Broke Again, Motown; Formats: Digital download, streaming	6	2	2	—	—	—	—	—	—		
"—" denotes a recording that did not chart or was not released in that territory.

=== Compilation albums ===
List of compilation albums, with selected chart positions and certifications
Title	Album details	Peak chart positions				Certifications
Title	Album details	US	US R&B/HH	US Rap	CAN	Certifications
4Respect 4Freedom 4Loyalty 4WhatImportant	Released: September 14, 2018; Label: Never Broke Again, APG, Atlantic; Format: Digital download, streaming	14	10	9	89	RIAA: Platinum
Lost Files	Released: December 23, 2022; Label: Never Broke Again, Atlantic; Format: Digital download, streaming	45	16	7	—	
More Leaks	Released: March 7, 2025; Label: Never Broke Again, Motown; Format: Digital download, streaming	29	12	9	—	
ML2	Released: June 26, 2026; Label: Never Broke Again, Motown; Format: Digital download, streaming	13	5	3	—	

== Extended plays ==
List of EPs with selected chart positions
Title	Album details	Peak chart positions		
Title	Album details	US	US R&B/HH	US Rap
4Respect	Released: August 24, 2018; Label: Never Broke Again, Atlantic; Format: Digital download, streaming	19	12	11
4Freedom	Released: August 30, 2018; Label: Never Broke Again, Atlantic; Format: Digital download, streaming	100	—	—
4Loyalty	Released: September 6, 2018; Label: Never Broke Again, Atlantic; Format: Digital download, streaming	67	16	—
"—" denotes a recording that did not chart or was not released in that territory.

== Mixtapes ==
List of mixtapes, with selected chart positions and certifications
Title	Album details	Peak chart positions						Certifications
Title	Album details	US	US R&B/HH	US Rap	CAN	NLD	UK	Certifications
Life Before Fame	Released: April 10, 2015; Label: Never Broke Again, 101; Format: Digital download	—	—	—	—	—	—	
Mind of a Menace	Released: December 1, 2015; Label: Never Broke Again, 101; Format: Digital download	—	—	—	—	—	—	
Mind of a Menace 2	Released: April 1, 2016; Label: Never Broke Again, 101; Format: Digital download	—	—	—	—	—	—	
Before I Go	Released: June 27, 2016; Label: Never Broke Again, 101; Format: Digital download	—	—	—	—	—	—	
38 Baby	Released: October 27, 2016; Label: Never Broke Again, 101; Format: Digital download, streaming	—	—	—	—	—	—	RIAA: Gold
Mind of a Menace 3	Released: November 4, 2016; Label: Never Broke Again, 101; Format: Digital download	—	—	—	—	—	—	
AI YoungBoy	Released: August 4, 2017; Label: Never Broke Again, APG, Atlantic; Format: Digital download, streaming	24	17	12	—	—	—	RIAA: Platinum
Ain't Too Long	Released: October 7, 2017; Label: Never Broke Again, APG, Atlantic; Format: Digital download, streaming	173	—	—	—	—	—	
Master the Day of Judgement	Released: May 19, 2018; Label: Never Broke Again, APG, Atlantic; Format: Digital download	139	—	—	—	—	—	
Decided	Released: September 7, 2018; Label: Never Broke Again, APG, Atlantic; Format: Digital download	41	23	20	—	—	—	RIAA: Gold
Realer	Released: December 20, 2018; Label: Never Broke Again, APG, Atlantic; Format: Digital download, streaming	15	11	9	—	168	—	RIAA: 2× Platinum
AI YoungBoy 2	Released: October 11, 2019; Label: Never Broke Again, APG, Atlantic; Format: LP, digital download, streaming	1	1	1	11	—	84	RIAA: 2× Platinum; RMNZ: Gold
Still Flexin, Still Steppin	Released: February 21, 2020; Label: Never Broke Again, APG, Atlantic; Format: Digital download, streaming	2	1	1	22	—	83	RIAA: Platinum
38 Baby 2	Released: April 24, 2020; Label: Never Broke Again, APG, Atlantic; Format: LP, digital download, streaming	1	1	1	24	—	—	RIAA: Gold
Until I Return	Released: November 11, 2020; Label: Never Broke Again, APG, Atlantic; Format: Digital download, streaming	10	5	5	—	—	—	
Colors	Released: January 21, 2022; Label: Never Broke Again, Atlantic; Format: CD, LP, digital download, streaming	2	1	1	21	—	—	RIAA: Gold
Realer 2	Released: September 6, 2022; Label: Never Broke Again, Atlantic; Format: CD, digital download, streaming	6	2	2	—	—	—	
3800 Degrees	Released: October 7, 2022; Label: Never Broke Again, Atlantic; Format: CD, digital download, streaming	12	6	4	—	—	—	
Ma' I Got a Family	Released: October 21, 2022; Hosted by: DJ Drama; Label: Never Broke Again, Atlantic; Format: Digital download, streaming	7	3	2	—	—	—	
Richest Opp	Released: May 12, 2023; Label: Never Broke Again, Motown; Format: Digital download, streaming	4	1	1	—	—	—	
Decided 2	Released: November 10, 2023; Label: Never Broke Again, Motown; Format: Digital download, streaming	17	5	3	—	—	—	
DeShawn	Released: August 12, 2025; Hosted by: DJ Khaled; Label: Never Broke Again, Motown; Format: Digital download, streaming	96	27	21	—	—	—	
"—" denotes a recording that did not chart or was not released in that territory

=== Collaborative mixtapes ===
List of collaborative mixtapes with selected chart positions
Title	Album details	Peak chart positions			
Title	Album details	US	US R&B/HH	US Rap	CAN
Fed Baby's (with Moneybagg Yo)	Released: November 16, 2017; Label: Never Broke Again, APG, Atlantic, Collective, Bread Gang, N-Less, Interscope; Formats: Digital download	21	9	7	—
Kane & O-Dog (with VL Deck)	Released: October 19, 2018; Label: Never Broke Again, Section 8, Empire; Format: Digital download, streaming	—	—	—	—
Nobody Safe (with Rich the Kid)	Released: November 20, 2020; Label: Never Broke Again, Rich Forever, Empire; Format: CD, LP, digital download, streaming	43	21	19	—
From the Bayou (with Birdman)	Released: December 10, 2021; Label: Never Broke Again, Cash Money, Atlantic, Republic; Format: Digital download, streaming	19	9	4	—
Better than You (with DaBaby)	Released: March 4, 2022; Label: Never Broke Again, South Coast, Interscope, Atlantic; Format: Digital download, streaming	10	7	5	62
3860 (with Quando Rondo)	Released: November 25, 2022; Label: Never Broke Again, Quando Rondo LLC, Atlantic; Format: Digital download, streaming	62	24	15	—
"—" denotes a recording that did not chart or was not released in that territory.

== Singles ==
=== As lead artist ===
List of singles as lead artist, with selected chart positions, showing year released and album name
Title	Year	Peak chart positions										Certifications	Album
Title	Year	US	US R&B/HH	US Rap	AUS	CAN	IRE	NZ	SWE	UK	WW	Certifications	Album
"Untouchable"	2017	95	39	—	—	—	—	—	—	—	—	RIAA: 2× Platinum; BPI: Silver; RMNZ: Platinum	AI YoungBoy
"41"	2017	—	—	—	—	—	—	—	—	—	—		Non-album singles
"GG (Remix)" (featuring A Boogie wit da Hoodie)	2017	—	—	—	—	—	—	—	—	—	—		Non-album singles
"No Smoke"	2017	61	29	—	—	—	—	—	—	—	—	RIAA: 3× Platinum	AI YoungBoy
"Outside Today"	2018	31	18	14	—	—	—	—	—	—	—	RIAA: 4× Platinum; BPI: Silver; RMNZ: Platinum	Until Death Call My Name
"Diamond Teeth Samurai"	2018	59	30	25	—	—	—	—	—	—	—	RIAA: Platinum	Until Death Call My Name
"Not Wrong Now"	2018	—	—	—	—	—	—	—	—	—	—		Non-album singles
"Blasian"	2018	—	—	—	—	—	—	—	—	—	—		Non-album singles
"Hypnotized"	2018	—	—	—	—	—	—	—	—	—	—		Non-album singles
"Valuable Pain"	2018	87	40	—	—	—	—	—	—	—	—	RIAA: 3× Platinum	Realer
"Kick Yo Door"	2019	—	—	—	—	—	—	—	—	—	—		Non-album singles
"Gangsta Fever"	2019	—	—	—	—	—	—	—	—	—	—	RIAA: Gold	Non-album singles
"Scenes" (featuring PnB Rock)	2019	—	—	—	—	—	—	—	—	—	—		Non-album singles
"Freeddawg"	2019	—	—	—	—	—	—	—	—	—	—		Non-album singles
"4 Sons of a King"	2019	—	—	—	—	—	—	—	—	—	—		Non-album singles
"Slime Mentality"	2019	— (Note: "Slime Mentality" did not chart on the Billboard Hot 100, but peaked at number one on the Bubbling Under Hot 100 Singles chart.)	—	—	—	—	—	—	—	—	—	RIAA: Gold	AI YoungBoy 2
"Self Control"	2019	50	24	19	—	—	—	—	—	—	—	RIAA: 2× Platinum	AI YoungBoy 2
"Bandit" (with Juice Wrld)	2019	10	5	4	45	11	30	40	57	42	—	RIAA: 6× Platinum; ARIA: Platinum; BPI: Platinum; RMNZ: 2× Platinum	Death Race for Love
"Lost Motives"	2019	—	—	—	—	—	—	—	—	—	—		Non-album singles
"Bring 'Em Out"	2019	—	—	—	—	—	—	—	—	—	—		Non-album singles
"Dirty Iyanna"	2019	67	28	21	—	—	—	—	—	—	—		Non-album singles
"Make No Sense"	2020	57	27	22	—	—	—	—	—	—	—	RIAA: 2× Platinum; BPI: Silver; RMNZ: Platinum	AI YoungBoy 2
"Ten Talk"	2020	— (Note: "Ten Talk" did not chart on the Billboard Hot 100, but peaked at number 15 on the Bubbling Under Hot 100 Singles chart.)	—	—	—	—	—	—	—	—	—	RIAA: Gold	38 Baby 2
"Drop'Em"	2020	—	—	—	—	—	—	—	—	—	—		Non-album singles
"Unchartered Love"	2020	—	—	—	—	—	—	—	—	—	—		Non-album singles
"AI Nash"	2020	— (Note: "AI Nash" did not chart on the Billboard Hot 100, but peaked at number eight on the Bubbling Under Hot 100 Singles chart.)	—	—	—	—	—	—	—	—	—	RIAA: Gold	38 Baby 2
"Step On Shit"	2020	—	—	—	—	—	—	—	—	—	—		Non-album single
"One Shot" (featuring Lil Baby)	2020	94	43	—	—	—	—	—	—	—	—	RIAA: Gold	Road to Fast 9
"Death Enclaimed"	2020	—	—	—	—	—	—	—	—	—	—		Non-album single
"Sticks with Me"	2020	—	—	—	—	—	—	—	—	—	—	RIAA: Platinum	Top
"All In"	2020	67	23	22	—	—	—	—	—	—	115	RIAA: 3× Platinum	Top
"Kacey Talk"	2020	50	19	18	—	—	—	—	—	—	87	RIAA: 5× Platinum	Top
"Callin" (featuring Snoop Dogg)	2020	— (Note: "Callin" did not chart on the Billboard Hot 100, but peaked at number three on the Bubbling Under Hot 100 Singles chart.)	42	—	—	—	—	—	—	—	—	RIAA: Gold	Top
"Soul Stealer"	2020	—	—	—	—	—	—	—	—	—	—		Non-album single
"Bankroll" (with Rich the Kid)	2020	—	—	—	—	—	—	—	—	—	—		Nobody Safe
"What That Speed Bout!?" (with Mike Will Made It and Nicki Minaj)	2020	35	11	10	—	76	—	— (Note: "What That Speed Bout!?" did not enter the NZ Top 40 Singles Chart, but peaked at number 16 on the NZ Hot Singles Chart.)	—	—	52		Michael
"The Story of O.J. (Top Version)"	2020	—	—	—	—	—	—	—	—	—	—		Non-album singles
"How I Been"	2020	—	—	—	—	—	—	—	—	—	—	RIAA: Gold	Non-album singles
"Green Dot"	2020	—	—	—	—	—	—	—	—	—	—	RIAA: Gold	Non-album singles
"Toxic Punk"	2021	99	49	—	—	—	—	—	—	—	—	RIAA: Gold	Sincerely, Kentrell
"It Ain't Over"	2021	—	—	—	—	—	—	—	—	—	—		Non-album singles
"I Ain't Scared"	2021	—	—	—	—	—	—	—	—	—	—		Non-album singles
"Territorial"	2021	—	—	—	—	—	—	—	—	—			Non-album singles
"White Teeth"	2021	78	39	—	—	—	—	—	—	—	—	RIAA: Gold	Sincerely, Kentrell
"Nevada"	2021	58	23	19	—	—	—	—	—	—	109	RIAA: Platinum; RMNZ: Gold	Sincerely, Kentrell
"Life Support"	2021	48	17	15	—	—	—	—	—	—	107	RIAA: Platinum	Sincerely, Kentrell
"On My Side"	2021	37	12	10	—	—	—	—	—	—	75	RIAA: Gold	Sincerely, Kentrell
"Bring the Hook"	2022	61	19	14	—	—	—	—	—	—	192	RIAA: Gold	Colors
"Hit" (with DaBaby)	2022	— (Note: "Hit" did not chart on the Billboard Hot 100, but peaked at number 25 on the Bubbling Under Hot 100 chart.)	—	—	—	—	—	—	—	—	—		Better than You
"Flossin'" (with Internet Money)	2022	72	27	20	—	—	—	— (Note: "Flossin'" did not enter the NZ Top 40 Singles Chart, but peaked at number 25 on the NZ Hot Singles Chart.)	—	—	143		Colors (Deluxe)
"Mr. Grim Reaper"	2022	—	—	—	—	—	—	—	—	—	—		The Last Slimeto
"SuperBowl"	2022	—	—	—	—	—	—	—	—	—	—		Non-album singles
"Opposite"	2022	—	—	—	—	—	—	—	—	—	—		Non-album singles
"I Hate YoungBoy"	2022	79	26	19	—	—	—	—	—	—	—	RIAA: Platinum	The Last Slimeto
"Neighborhood Superstar" (with DaBaby)	2022	89	31	—	—	—	— (Note: "Neighborhood Superstar" did not enter the NZ Top 40 Singles Chart, but peaked at number 33 on the NZ Hot Singles Chart.)	—	—	—	—		Better than You
"Bestie" (with DaBaby)	2022	— (Note: "Bestie" did not enter the Billboard Hot 100, but peaked at number 13 on the Bubbling Under Hot 100 chart.)	43	—	—	—	—	—	—	—	—		Better than You
"Don't Rate Me" (featuring Quavo)	2022	—	—	—	—	—	—	—	—	—	—		The Last Slimeto
"Vette Motors"	2022	62	19	17	—	—	—	—	—	—	—	RIAA: 2× Platinum	The Last Slimeto
"Late to da Party (F*ck BET)" (with Lil Nas X)	2022	67	16	15	54	42	83	— (Note: "Late to da Party" did not enter the NZ Top 40 Singles Chart, but peaked at number six on the NZ Hot Singles Chart.)	— (Note: "Late to da Party" did not enter the Swedish Singellista Chart, but peaked at number fifteen on the Swedish Heatseeker Chart.)	—	77		Non-album singles
"Give Me a Sign" (with Quando Rondo)	2022	—	—	—	—	—	—	—	—	—	—		3860 & Recovery
"Put It on Me"	2022	63	16	11	—	—	—	—	—	—	—	RIAA: Platinum	Realer 2
"WTF" (with Nicki Minaj)	2023	99	32	23	—	—	—	—	—	—	—		Don't Try This at Home
"Rear View" (with Mariah the Scientist)	2023	—	50	—	—	—	—	—	—	—	—		Don't Try This at Home
"Cut U Off" (with Joyner Lucas)	2023	—	—	—	—	—	—	— (Note: "Cut U Off" did not enter the NZ Top 40 Singles Chart, but peaked at number 27 on the NZ Hot Singles Chart.)	—	—	—		Not Now, I’m Busy
"Testimony"	2023	— (Note: "Testimony" did not chart on the Billboard Hot 100, but peaked at number 13 on the Bubbling Under Hot 100 Singles chart.)	—	—	—	—	—	—	—	—	—		Non-album singles
"Heard of Me"	2023	— (Note: "Heard of Me" did not chart on the Billboard Hot 100, but peaked at number 24 on the Bubbling Under Hot 100 Singles chart.)	—	—	—	—	—	—	—	—	—		Non-album singles
"Run"	2023	—	49	—	—	—	—	—	—	—	—		Non-album singles
"Act a Donkey"	2024	—	—	—	—	—	—	—	—	—	—		Non-album singles
"Bnyx Da Reaper"	2024	—	—	—	—	—	—	—	—	—	—		Non-album singles
"Fuck Niggaz"	2024	— (Note: "Fuck Niggaz" did not chart on the Billboard Hot 100, but peaked at number one on the Bubbling Under Hot 100 Singles chart.)	48	—	—	—	—	—	—	—	—		Non-album singles
"No Time"	2024	—	—	—	—	—	—	—	—	—	—		Non-album singles
"Top Tingz"	2025	—	28	18	—	—	—	—	—	—	—		MASA
"What You Is" (with Mellow Rackz)	2025	75	15	10	—	—	—	—	—	—	—		Non-album singles
"Please Don't Go" (with Toosii)	2025	—	—	—	—	—	—	—	—	—	—		Non-album singles
"Top Cobain"	2025	—	33	—	—	—	—	—	—	—	—		Non-album singles
"Devil Go Away" (with Jelly Roll)	2026	—	—	—	—	—	—	—	—	—	—		Slime Cry
"Rooms" (with Mike Will Made It and Chief Keef)	2026	— (Note: "Rooms" did not chart on the Billboard Hot 100, but peaked at number ten on the Bubbling Under Hot 100 Singles chart.)	44	—	—	—	—	—	—	—	—		R3set
"Try So Hard" (with Never Broke Again)	2026	—	50	—	—	—	—	—	—	—	—		Non-album single
"—" denotes a recording that did not chart or was not released in that territory.

=== As featured artist ===
List of singles as a featured artist, with selected chart positions, showing year released and album name
Title	Year	Peak chart positions										Certifications	Album
Title	Year	US	US R&B/HH	US Rap	AUS	CAN	IRE	NLD	NZ	UK	WW	Certifications	Album
"Dope Good" (Teflon Mark featuring YoungBoy Never Broke Again & King Stevie D.)	2017	—	—	—	—	—	—	—	—	—	—		Non-album single
"Beast Mode" (A Boogie wit da Hoodie featuring PnB Rock and YoungBoy Never Broke Again)	2017	86	38	—	—	—	—	—	—	—	—	RIAA: Platinum; MC: Platinum	The Bigger Artist
"Doin' Bad" (OMB Peezy featuring YoungBoy Never Broke Again)	2017	—	—	—	—	—	—	—	—	—	—		Humble Beginnings
"Check Callin" (Plies featuring YoungBoy Never Broke Again)	2017	—	—	—	—	—	—	—	—	—	—		Non-album singles
"FWM Remix" (XO featuring YoungBoy Never Broke Again & Boosie Badazz)	2017	—	—	—	—	—	—	—	—	—	—		Non-album singles
"New Money" (Spacejam Bo featuring YoungBoy Never Broke Again)	2017	—	—	—	—	—	—	—	—	—	—		Cote Kid
"My Side" (Lil Durk featuring YoungBoy Never Broke Again)	2017	—	—	—	—	—	—	—	—	—	—		Non-album single
"16" (Jamie Ray featuring YoungBoy Never Broke Again)	2017	—	—	—	—	—	—	—	—	—	—		Castles in the Air
"In the Bank" (Famous Dex featuring YoungBoy Never Broke Again)	2018	—	—	—	—	—	—	—	—	—	—		Non-album single
"FN Everything (Remix)" (Damar Jackson featuring YoungBoy Never Broke Again)	2018	—	—	—	—	—	—	—	—	—	—		Unfaithful (Deluxe)
"Can I Trust You" (Jdagr8 featuring YoungBoy Never Broke Again)	2018	—	—	—	—	—	—	—	—	—	—		Tillweallrich
"Gutta Boy" (All-Star Will featuring YoungBoy Never Broke Again)	2018	—	—	—	—	—	—	—	—	—	—		Non-album single
"Sleepin" (Leeky Bandz featuring YoungBoy Never Broke Again)	2018	—	—	—	—	—	—	—	—	—	—		Life After Future
"Savage Life" (Johnni Blaze featuring YoungBoy Never Broke Again)	2018	—	—	—	—	—	—	—	—	—	—		5:12
"Where We Come From" (Shy Glizzy featuring YoungBoy Never Broke Again)	2018	—	—	—	—	—	—	—	—	—	—		Fully Loaded
"Movin On" (OG 3Three featuring YoungBoy Never Broke Again)	2018	—	—	—	—	—	—	—	—	—	—		Non-album single
"Richer than Errybody" (Gucci Mane featuring YoungBoy Never Broke Again and DaBaby)	2019	—	—	—	—	—	—	—	—	—	—		Woptober II
"Money Talk" (Rich the Kid featuring YoungBoy Never Broke Again)	2020	—	—	—	—	—	—	—	—	—	—		Boss Man
"Need It" (Migos featuring YoungBoy Never Broke Again)	2020	62	28	25	—	—	—	—	— (Note: "Need It" did not enter the NZ Top 40 Singles Chart, but peaked at number 19 on the NZ Hot Singles Chart.)	—	—	RIAA: 2× Platinum; BPI: Silver; RMNZ: 2× Platinum	Culture III
"Trillionaire" (Future featuring YoungBoy Never Broke Again)	2020	34	16	14	—	69	—	—	— (Note: "Trillionaire" did not enter the NZ Top 40 Singles Chart, but peaked at number 19 on the NZ Hot Singles Chart.)	85	—	RIAA: Platinum	High Off Life
"Im On" (P Yungin featuring YoungBoy Never Broke Again)	2020	—	—	—	—	—	—	—	—	—	—		Demons Everywhere I Go
"Everything Different" (Culture Jam and Rod Wave featuring YoungBoy Never Broke Again)	2021	—	—	—	—	—	—	—	—	—	—		Culture Jam
"WusYaName" (Tyler, the Creator featuring YoungBoy Never Broke Again and Ty Dolla Sign)	2021	14	6	3	22	22	24	89	14	25	19	RIAA: 2× Platinum; BPI: Silver; MC: Gold; RMNZ: Platinum	Call Me If You Get Lost
"Pull Up Actin" (Never Broke Again featuring YoungBoy Never Broke Again and P Yungin)	2022	—	—	—	—	—	—	—	—	—	—		Green Flag Activity
"Gang Baby" (Never Broke Again featuring YoungBoy Never Broke Again, P Yungin, Rojay MLP and RJAE)	2022	—	—	—	—	—	—	—	—	—	—		Green Flag Activity
"All My Shit Is Stupid" (iLoveMakonnen featuring YoungBoy Never Broke Again)	2022	—	—	—	—	—	—	—	—	—	—		Summer22
"2Tone" (Cootie featuring YoungBoy Never Broke Again)	2022	—	—	—	—	—	—	—	—	—	—		In Trap We Trust
"Military" (Rich Gang featuring YoungBoy Never Broke Again and Drok)	2022	—	—	—	—	—	—	—	—	—	—		Non-album single
"Fools Fall n Love" (Shy Glizzy featuring YoungBoy Never Broke Again)	2023	—	—	—	—	—	—	—	—	—	—		Flowers
"Won't Back Down" (Bailey Zimmerman and Dermot Kennedy featuring YoungBoy Never Broke Again)	2023	—	—	—	—	—	98	—	—	—	—		Fast X
"Project Walls" (Lil Tjay featuring YoungBoy Never Broke Again)	2023	— (Note: "Project Walls" did not chart on the Billboard Hot 100, but peaked at number nine on the Bubbling Under Hot 100 Singles chart.)	32	23	—	—	—	—	— (Note: "Project Walls" did not enter the NZ Top 40 Singles Chart, but peaked at number 12 on the NZ Hot Singles Chart.)	—	—		222
"In n Out" (Susie B featuring YoungBoy Never Broke Again)	2023	—	—	—	—	—	—	—	—	—	—		Non-album singles
"Parasites" (iLoveMakonnen featuring YoungBoy Never Broke Again)	2023	—	—	—	—	—	—	—	—	—	—		Non-album singles
"Crazy Girl P2" (Bktherula featuring YoungBoy Never Broke Again)	2023	—	—	—	—	—	—	—	—	—	—		Non-album singles
"No Fake Love" (Queen Naija featuring YoungBoy Never Broke Again)	2023	—	— (Note: "No Fake Love" did not chart on the Billboard Hot R&B/Hip-Hop Songs, but peaked at number twelve on the Hot R&B Songs chart.)	—	—	—	—	—	—	—	—		After the Butterflies
"First Day Out (Freestyle) [Youngboy Edition]" (Rundown Spaz featuring YoungBoy Never Broke Again and Rundown Choppaboy)	2023	—	—	—	—	—	—	—	—	—	—		Non-album single
"FYN" (Tre Savage featuring YoungBoy Never Broke Again)	2024	—	—	—	—	—	—	—	—	—	—		I Aint Have Nothing but a Dream
"Swear" (J.K. Mac featuring YoungBoy Never Broke Again)	2024	—	—	—	—	—	—	—	—	—	—		Non-album singles
"Engine" (Lil Mabu featuring YoungBoy Never Broke Again)	2024	—	—	—	—	—	—	—	—	—	—		Non-album singles
"Llogclay" (T.I. featuring YoungBoy Never Broke Again)	2024	—	—	—	—	—	—	—	—	—	—		Kill the King
"Why Oh Why" (Sean Kingston featuring YoungBoy Never Broke Again)	2024	—	—	—	—	—	—	—	—	—	—		Non-album singles
"Matador" (Kevin Smiley featuring YoungBoy Never Broke Again)	2024	—	—	—	—	—	—	—	—	—	—		Non-album singles
"Luv Lik Me" (J.K. Mac featuring YoungBoy Never Broke Again)	2024	—	—	—	—	—	—	—	—	—	—		Non-album singles
"Alive" (Kanye West featuring YoungBoy Never Broke Again)	2025	—	—	—	—	—	—	—	— (Note: "Alive" did not enter the NZ Top 40 Singles Chart, but peaked at number 25 on the NZ Hot Singles Chart.)	—	—		Non-album singles
"Brother" (DJ Khaled and Post Malone featuring YoungBoy Never Broke Again)	2025	—	30	23	—	—	—	—	—	—	—		Aalam of God
"Fun" (Mellow Rackz featuring YoungBoy Never Broke Again)	2025	—	—	—	—	—	—	—	—	—	—		Nothing to Something
"Gettin' Older" (Jas Von featuring YoungBoy Never Broke Again)	2025	—	—	—	—	—	—	—	—	—	—		Non-album singles
"Putting Ya Dine" (Remix) (Monaleo featuring YoungBoy Never Broke Again)	2025	—	—	—	—	—	—	—	—	—	—		Non-album singles
"Fuck that Nigga" (Birdman featuring YoungBoy Never Broke Again and Herm Tha BlackSheep)	2025	—	—	—	—	—	—	—	—	—	—		Non-album singles
"Better than Yours" (Coi Leray featuring YoungBoy Never Broke Again)	2026	—	—	—	—	—	—	—	—	—	—		Non-album singles
"Deep End" (Joyner Lucas featuring YoungBoy Never Broke Again)	2026	—	—	—	—	—	—	—	—	—	—		ADHD 2
"Hoe Phase" (Jorjiana featuring YoungBoy Never Broke Again)	2026	—	—	—	—	—	—	—	—	—	—		Non-album single
"Free 40" (Skrilla featuring YoungBoy Never Broke Again)	2026	—	—	—	—	—	—	—	—	—	—		Z
"—" denotes a recording that did not chart or was not released in that territory.

=== Promotional singles ===
List of promotional singles, with selected chart positions, showing year released and album name
Title	Year	Peak chart positions			Certifications	Album
Title	Year	US	US R&B/HH	US Rap	Certifications	Album
"Love Is Poison"	2018	—	—	—	RIAA: Platinum	Until Death Call My Name
"Through the Storm"	2018	—	—	—	RIAA: 2× Platinum; RMNZ: Gold	Until Death Call My Name
"Genie"	2018	— (Note: "Genie" did not chart on the Billboard Hot 100, but peaked at number 12 on the Bubbling Under Hot 100 Singles chart.)	—	—	RIAA: 3× Platinum	Until Death Call My Name
"Fish Scale"	2022	68	23	16	RIAA: Gold	Colors
"See Me Now"	2022	—	—	—		Non-album singles
"Proud of Myself"	2022	—	—	—		Non-album singles
"Goals"	2022	—	—	—		Non-album singles
"I Don't Talk"	2022	—	—	—		Non-album singles
"Change"	2022	—	—	—		Non-album singles
"She Want Chanel"	2022	—	—	—		Non-album singles
"Feel Good"	2022	—	—	—		Non-album singles
"Keep Me Dry" (with Quando Rondo)	2022	—	—	—		3860
"It's On" (with Quando Rondo)	2022	—	—	—		3860
"Top Girls"	2023	—	—	—		I Rest My Case
"Black"	2023	93	39	19		I Rest My Case
"I Love YB Skit"	2023	—	—	—		I Rest My Case
"Groovy"	2023	—	—	—		I Rest My Case
"Next"	2023	— (Note: "Next" did not chart on the Billboard Hot 100, but peaked at number 24 on the Bubbling Under Hot 100 Singles chart.)	48	—		Non-album singles
"Demon Party"	2023	—	—	—		Non-album singles
"Now Who"	2023	—	—	—	RIAA: Gold	Decided 2
"My Body"	2023	—	—	—		Decided 2
"Deep Down"	2023	—	—	—	RIAA: Gold	Decided 2
"Closed Case"	2024	—	—	—		Non-album singles
"Steppa"	2024	—	—	—		Non-album singles
"We Shot Him in His Head Huh"	2024	—	—	—		Non-album singles
"Boat"	2024	—	—	—		Non-album singles
"Tears of War"	2024	—	—	—		I Just Got a Lot on My Shoulders
"5 Night"	2025	—	—	—		More Leaks
"Shot Callin"	2025	43	7	2	RIAA: Platinum	MASA
"Where I Been"	2025	—	—	—		MASA
"Finest"	2025	— (Note: "Finest" did not chart on the Billboard Hot 100, but peaked at number 16 on the Bubbling Under Hot 100 chart.)	22	13		MASA
"So Not Sorry"	2025	—	—	—		Non-album singles
"Nussie"	2025	—	—	—		Non-album singles
"I Forgive Them"	2025	—	—	—		Non-album singles
"Shark"	2025	—	40	—		Non-album singles
"Out the Window"	2025	—	—	—		Non-album singles
"Zero IQ Freestyle"	2025	—	—	—		Non-album singles
"—" denotes a recording that did not chart or was not released in that territory.

== Other charted and certified songs ==
List of songs, with selected chart positions and certifications, showing year released and album name
Title	Year	Peak chart positions							Certifications	Album
Title	Year	US	US R&B/HH	US Rap	AUS	CAN	NZ Hot	WW	Certifications	Album
"38 Baby"	2016	—	—	—	—	—	—	—	RIAA: Gold	38 Baby
"Gravity"	2016	—	—	—	—	—	—	—	RIAA: Platinum	38 Baby
"No. 9"	2017	—	—	—	—	—	—	—	RIAA: Gold	AI YoungBoy
"Graffiti"	2017	—	— (Note: "Graffiti" did not chart on the Billboard Hot R&B/Hip-Hop Songs chart, but peaked at number 10 on the Bubbling Under R&B/Hip-Hop Singles chart.)	—	—	—	—	—	RIAA: Platinum	AI YoungBoy
"GG"	2017	—	—	—	—	—	—	—	RIAA: Gold	AI YoungBoy
"War With Us"	2017	—	—	—	—	—	—	—	RIAA: Gold	Ain't Too Long
"You the One"	2017	—	—	—	—	—	—	—	RIAA: Platinum	Ain't Too Long
"Pleading the Fifth" (with Moneybagg Yo featuring Quavo)	2017	—	—	—	—	—	—	—	RIAA: Gold	Fed Baby's
"NBAYoungBoat" (Lil Yachty featuring YoungBoy Never Broke Again)	2018	63	31	—	—	—	—	—	RIAA: Platinum	Lil Boat 2
"Overdose"	2018	42	22	16	—	—	—	—	RIAA: Platinum	Until Death Call My Name
"Preach"	2018	98	— (Note: "Preach" did not chart on the Billboard Hot R&B/Hip-Hop Songs chart, but peaked at number one on the Bubbling Under R&B/Hip-Hop Singles chart.)	—	—	—	—	—	RIAA: Platinum	Until Death Call My Name
"Astronaut Kid"	2018	—	—	—	—	—	—	—	RIAA: Gold	Until Death Call My Name
"We Poppin" (featuring Birdman)	2018	— (Note: "We Poppin" did not chart on the Billboard Hot 100, but peaked at number 10 on the Bubbling Under Hot 100 Singles chart.)	—	—	—	—	—	—	RIAA: Platinum	Until Death Call My Name
"Solar Eclipse"	2018	— (Note: "Solar Eclipse" did not chart on the Billboard Hot 100, but peaked at number six on the Bubbling Under Hot 100 Singles chart.)	46	—	—	—	—	—	RIAA: 2× Platinum	Until Death Call My Name
"Traumatized"	2018	—	—	—	—	—	—	—	RIAA: Gold	Until Death Call My Name
"Worth It"	2018	—	—	—	—	—	—	—	RIAA: Gold	Until Death Call My Name
"Show Me Your Love"	2018	—	—	—	—	—	—	—	RIAA: Gold	Master the Day of Judgement
"Akbar"	2018	—	—	—	—	—	—	—	RIAA: Gold	Master the Day of Judgement
"Trap House"	2018	—	—	—	—	—	—	—	RIAA: Gold	4Respect 4Freedom 4Loyalty 4WhatImportant
"Can't Be Saved"	2018	—	—	—	—	—	—	—	RIAA: Gold	4Respect 4Freedom 4Loyalty 4WhatImportant
"Head On" (featuring Kevin Gates)	2018	—	—	—	—	—	—	—	RIAA: Gold	4Respect 4Freedom 4Loyalty 4WhatImportant
"I Am Who They Say I Am" (featuring Quando Rondo and Kevin Gates)	2018	69	24	21	—	—	—	—	RIAA: 2× Platinum	4Respect 4Freedom 4Loyalty 4WhatImportant
"TTG" (featuring Kevin Gates)	2018	— (Note: "TTG" did not chart on the Billboard Hot 100, but peaked at number three on the Bubbling Under Hot 100 Singles chart.)	45	—	—	—	—	—	RIAA: Platinum	4Respect 4Freedom 4Loyalty 4WhatImportant
"This for the" (featuring Quando Rondo)	2018	—	—	—	—	—	—	—	RIAA: Gold	4Respect 4Freedom 4Loyalty 4WhatImportant
"Nobody Hold Me" (featuring Quando Rondo)	2018	—	—	—	—	—	—	—	RIAA: Gold	4Respect 4Freedom 4Loyalty 4WhatImportant
"Drawing Symbols"	2018	— (Note: "Drawing Symbols" did not chart on the Billboard Hot 100, but peaked at number two on the Bubbling Under Hot 100 Singles chart.)	—	—	—	—	—	—	RIAA: Platinum	4Respect 4Freedom 4Loyalty 4WhatImportant
"Sky Cry"	2018	—	—	—	—	—	—	—	RIAA: Gold	Decided
"Demon Seed"	2018	—	—	—	—	—	—	—	RIAA: Gold	Decided
"No Love"	2018	—	—	—	—	—	—	—	RIAA: Platinum	Decided
"Murda" (featuring Trippie Redd)	2018	—	—	—	—	—	—	—	RIAA: Gold	Decided
"No Mentions"	2018	— (Note: "No Mentions" did not chart on the Billboard Hot 100, but peaked at number 18 on the Bubbling Under Hot 100 Singles chart.)	—	—	—	—	—	—	RIAA: Platinum	Decided
"Survivor"	2018	— (Note: "Survivor" did not chart on the Billboard Hot 100, but peaked at number 19 on the Bubbling Under Hot 100 Singles chart.)	—	—	—	—	—	—	RIAA: Gold	Realer
"Slime Belief"	2018	— (Note: "Slime Belief" did not chart on the Billboard Hot 100, but peaked at number two on the Bubbling Under Hot 100 Singles chart.)	49	—	—	—	—	—	RIAA: 2× Platinum	Realer
"Play Wit Us"	2018	—	—	—	—	—	—	—	RIAA: Gold	Realer
"Beam Effect"	2018	—	—	—	—	—	—	—	RIAA: Gold	Realer
"Cross Me" (featuring Lil Baby and Plies)	2018	— (Note: "Cross Me" did not chart on the Billboard Hot 100, but peaked at number 22 on the Bubbling Under Hot 100 Singles chart.)	—	—	—	—	—	—	RIAA: Platinum	Realer
"Dope Lamp"	2018	—	—	—	—	—	—	—	RIAA: Gold	Realer
"I Came Thru"	2018	—	—	—	—	—	—	—	RIAA: Platinum	Realer
"Carter Son"	2019	62	32	—	—	—	—	—	RIAA: Gold	AI YoungBoy 2
"Time I'm On"	2019	79	39	—	—	—	—	—	RIAA: Gold	AI YoungBoy 2
"Hot Now"	2019	66	34	—	—	—	—	—	RIAA: Platinum	AI YoungBoy 2
"Seeming Like It"	2019	— (Note: "Seeming Like It" did not chart on the Billboard Hot 100, but peaked at number 15 on the Bubbling Under Hot 100 chart.)	—	—	—	—	—	—	RIAA: Gold	AI YoungBoy 2
"Rich as Hell"	2019	79	38	—	—	—	—	—	RIAA: Gold	AI YoungBoy 2
"Head Blown"	2019	— (Note: "Head Blown" did not chart on the Billboard Hot 100, but peaked at number 17 on the Bubbling Under Hot 100 chart.)	—	—	—	—	—	—	RIAA: Gold	AI YoungBoy 2
"Ranada"	2019	— (Note: "Ranada" did not chart on the Billboard Hot 100, but peaked at number four on the Bubbling Under Hot 100 chart.)	—	—	—	—	—	—	RIAA: Platinum	AI YoungBoy 2
"Lonely Child"	2019	44	22	17	—	—	—	—	RIAA: Platinum	AI YoungBoy 2
"Gang Shit"	2019	— (Note: "Gang Shit" did not chart on the Billboard Hot 100, but peaked at number 16 on the Bubbling Under Hot 100 chart.)	—	—	—	—	—	—	RIAA: Gold	AI YoungBoy 2
"Rebel's Kick It"	2019	— (Note: "Rebel's Kick It" did not chart on the Billboard Hot 100, but peaked at number 11 on the Bubbling Under Hot 100 chart.)	—	—	—	—	—	—	RIAA: Gold	AI YoungBoy 2
"Outta Here Safe" (featuring Quando Rondo and NoCap)	2019	— (Note: "Outta Here Safe" did not chart on the Billboard Hot 100, but peaked at number 23 on the Bubbling Under Hot 100 chart.)	—	—	—	—	—	—	RIAA: Gold	AI YoungBoy 2
"In Control"	2019	73	37	—	—	—	—	—	RIAA: Gold	AI YoungBoy 2
"I Don't Know"	2019	—	—	—	—	—	—	—	RIAA: Gold	AI YoungBoy 2
"Where the Love At"	2019	—	—	—	—	—	—	—	RIAA: Gold	AI YoungBoy 2
"Free Time"	2019	—	—	—	—	—	—	—	RIAA: Gold	AI YoungBoy 2
"Hate Me" (Trippie Redd featuring YoungBoy Never Broke Again)	2019	84	38	—	—	—	—	—	RIAA: Platinum	A Love Letter to You 4
"RIP Lil Phat"	2020	80	38	—	—	—	—	—		Still Flexin, Still Steppin
"Knocked Off"	2020	60	29	21	—	—	—	—	RIAA: Gold	Still Flexin, Still Steppin
"Lil Top"	2020	28	14	9	—	—	—	—	RIAA: 3× Platinum	Still Flexin, Still Steppin
"Red Eye"	2020	47	21	15	—	—	—	—	RIAA: Platinum	Still Flexin, Still Steppin
"Fine by Time"	2020	58	28	20	—	—	—	—	RIAA: Gold	Still Flexin, Still Steppin
"Suited Panamera" (featuring Quando Rondo)	2020	— (Note: "Suited Panamera" did not chart on the Billboard Hot 100, but peaked at number four on the Bubbling Under Hot 100 Singles chart.)	48	—	—	—	—	—		Still Flexin, Still Steppin
"How You Want It"	2020	— (Note: "How You Want It" did not chart on the Billboard Hot 100, but peaked at number five on the Bubbling Under Hot 100 Singles chart.)	—	—	—	—	—	—		Still Flexin, Still Steppin
"Long RD"	2020	85	40	—	—	—	—	—	RIAA: Gold	Still Flexin, Still Steppin
"Okay"	2020	— (Note: "Okay" did not chart on the Billboard Hot 100, but peaked at number nine on the Bubbling Under Hot 100 Singles chart.)	—	—	—	—	—	—		Still Flexin, Still Steppin
"Bat Man"	2020	89	42	—	—	—	—	—		Still Flexin, Still Steppin
"Call Me Late"	2020	— (Note: "Call Me Late" did not chart on the Billboard Hot 100, but peaked at number 14 on the Bubbling Under Hot 100 Singles chart.)	—	—	—	—	—	—		Still Flexin, Still Steppin
"Gunsmoke"	2020	— (Note: "Gunsmoke" did not chart on the Billboard Hot 100, but peaked at number 25 on the Bubbling Under Hot 100 Singles chart.)	—	—	—	—	—	—		Still Flexin, Still Steppin
"Bad Bad"	2020	59	30	22	—	—	—	—	RIAA: Platinum	Still Flexin, Still Steppin
"No Understand"	2020	— (Note: "No Understand" did not chart on the Billboard Hot 100, but peaked at number 11 on the Bubbling Under Hot 100 Singles chart.)	—	—	—	—	—	—		Still Flexin, Still Steppin
"Jump" (DaBaby featuring YoungBoy Never Broke Again)	2020	17	9	6	—	62	12	—	RIAA: Gold	Blame It on Baby
"Bout My Business" (featuring Sherhonda Gaulden)	2020	90	42	—	—	—	—	—		38 Baby 2
"Diamonds"	2020	86	39	—	—	—	—	—		38 Baby 2
"Shadows"	2020	— (Note: "Shadows" did not chart on the Billboard Hot 100, but peaked at number 13 on the Bubbling Under Hot 100 Singles chart.)	—	—	—	—	—	—		38 Baby 2
"Win Your Love"	2020	— (Note: "Win Your Love" did not chart on the Billboard Hot 100, but peaked at number one on the Bubbling Under Hot 100 Singles chart.)	—	—	—	—	—	—		38 Baby 2
"Ain't Easy"	2020	83	37	—	—	—	—	—		38 Baby 2
"Rough Ryder"	2020	92	44	—	—	—	—	—		38 Baby 2
"I-10 Baby"	2020	— (Note: "I-10 Baby" did not chart on the Billboard Hot 100, but peaked at number five on the Bubbling Under Hot 100 Singles chart.)	—	—	—	—	—	—		38 Baby 2
"Nawfside"	2020	— (Note: "Nawfside" did not chart on the Billboard Hot 100, but peaked at number four on the Bubbling Under Hot 100 Singles chart.)	—	—	—	—	—	—		38 Baby 2
"Treat You Better"	2020	— (Note: "Treat You Better" did not chart on the Billboard Hot 100, but peaked at number 25 on the Bubbling Under Hot 100 Singles chart.)	—	—	—	—	—	—		38 Baby 2
"Thug of Spades" (featuring DaBaby)	2020	99	49	—	—	—	—	—		38 Baby 2
"AI Nash"	2020	— (Note: "AI Nash" did not chart on the Billboard Hot 100, but peaked at number eight on the Bubbling Under Hot 100 Singles chart.)	—	—	—	—	—	—	RIAA: Gold	38 Baby 2
"Ten Talk"	2020	— (Note: "Ten Talk" did not chart on the Billboard Hot 100, but peaked at number 15 on the Bubbling Under Hot 100 Singles chart.)	—	—	—	—	—	—	RIAA: Gold	38 Baby 2
"Drug Addiction"	2020	44	17	16	—	—	—	73	RIAA: Platinum	Top
"Cross Roads"	2020	76	28	—	—	—	—	133	RIAA: Gold	Top
"The Last Backyard..."	2020	81	31	—	—	—	—	141		Top
"Right Foot Creep"	2020	88	35	—	—	—	—	186	RIAA: Platinum	Top
"Dirty Stick"	2020	98	40	—	—	—	—	—		Top
"My Window" (featuring Lil Wayne)	2020	35	14	13	—	—	21	52	RIAA: Platinum	Top
"I'm Up"	2020	— (Note: "I'm Up" did not chart on the Billboard Hot 100, but peaked at number one on the Bubbling Under Hot 100 chart.)	43	—	—	—	—	—		Top
"Off Season"	2020	— (Note: "Off Season" did not chart on the Billboard Hot 100, but peaked at number two on the Bubbling Under Hot 100 chart.)	44	—	—	—	—	—		Top
"Dead Trollz"	2020	72	26	25	—	—	—	154	RIAA: Platinum	Top
"Fuck Ya!"	2020	— (Note: "Fuck Ya!" did not chart on the Billboard Hot 100, but peaked at number 20 on the Bubbling Under Hot 100 chart.)	—	—	—	—	—	—		Top
"Big Bankroll"	2020	— (Note: "Big Bankroll!" did not chart on the Billboard Hot 100, but peaked at number 21 on the Bubbling Under Hot 100 chart.)	—	—	—	—	—	—		Top
"Reaper's Child"	2020	— (Note: "Reaper's Child" did not chart on the Billboard Hot 100, but peaked at number nine on the Bubbling Under Hot 100 chart.)	—	—	—	—	—	—		Top
"Murder Business"	2020	— (Note: "Murder Business" did not chart on the Billboard Hot 100, but peaked at number four on the Bubbling Under Hot 100 chart.)	41	—	—	—	—	—	RIAA: Platinum	Top
"House Arrest Tingz"	2020	— (Note: "House Arrest Tingz" did not chart on the Billboard Hot 100, but peaked at number 16 on the Bubbling Under Hot 100 chart.)	—	—	—	—	—	—	RIAA: 3× Platinum	Top
"To My Lowest"	2020	— (Note: "To My Lowest" did not chart on the Billboard Hot 100, but peaked at number three on the Bubbling Under Hot 100 chart.)	45	—	—	—	—	—	RIAA: Platinum	Top
"Peace Hardly"	2020	— (Note: "Peace Hardly" did not chart on the Billboard Hot 100, but peaked at number 13 on the Bubbling Under Hot 100 chart.)	—	—	—	—	—	—		Top
"Tragic" (The Kid Laroi featuring YoungBoy Never Broke Again and Internet Money)	2020	76	30	—	41	59	2	110	RIAA: Platinum; ARIA: Gold; MC: Platinum; RMNZ: Gold	F*ck Love (Savage)
"Around"	2020	— (Note: "Around" did not chart on the Billboard Hot 100, but peaked at number 16 on the Bubbling Under Hot 100 Singles chart.)	—	—	—	—	—	—		Until I Return
"Chopper City"	2020	— (Note: "Chopper City" did not chart on the Billboard Hot 100, but peaked at number 18 on the Bubbling Under Hot 100 Singles chart.)	—	—	—	—	—	—		Until I Return
"Hood Melody" (DDG and OG Parker featuring YoungBoy Never Broke Again)	2021	—	—	—	—	—	—	—	RIAA: Gold	Die 4 Respect
"Bad Morning"	2021	28	9	7	—	—	—	55	RIAA: Platinum	Sincerely, Kentrell
"Hold Me Down"	2021	53	20	17	—	—	—	103	RIAA: Gold	Sincerely, Kentrell
"Smoke Strong"	2021	61	26	22	—	—	—	124		Sincerely, Kentrell
"50 Shots"	2021	59	24	20	—	—	—	118		Sincerely, Kentrell
"No Where"	2021	40	14	12	—	—	40	77	RIAA: Gold	Sincerely, Kentrell
"Sincerely"	2021	67	29	24	—	—	—	149	RIAA: Gold	Sincerely, Kentrell
"I Can't Take It Back"	2021	69	30	25	—	—	—	156	RIAA: Gold	Sincerely, Kentrell
"Rich Shit"	2021	83	39	—	—	—	—	184		Sincerely, Kentrell
"My Killa"	2021	— (Note: "My Killa" did not chart on the Billboard Hot 100, but peaked at number two on the Bubbling Under Hot 100 Singles chart.)	—	—	—	—	—	—		Sincerely, Kentrell
"Break or Make Me"	2021	62	27	23	—	—	—	151	RIAA: Platinum	Sincerely, Kentrell
"Forgiato"	2021	80	38	—	—	—	—	—		Sincerely, Kentrell
"Baddest Thing"	2021	92	44	—	—	—	—	—		Sincerely, Kentrell
"Level I Want to Reach"	2021	— (Note: "Level I Want to Reach" did not chart on the Billboard Hot 100, but peaked at number five on the Bubbling Under Hot 100 Singles chart.)	—	—	—	—	—	—		Sincerely, Kentrell
"Kickstand"	2021	— (Note: "Kickstand" did not chart on the Billboard Hot 100, but peaked at number one on the Bubbling Under Hot 100 Singles chart.)	—	—	—	—	—	—		Sincerely, Kentrell
"All I Need"	2021	— (Note: "All I Need" did not chart on the Billboard Hot 100, but peaked at number 18 on the Bubbling Under Hot 100 Singles chart.)	—	—	—	—	—	—		Sincerely, Kentrell
"Panoramic"	2021	— (Note: "Panoramic" did not chart on the Billboard Hot 100, but peaked at number nine on the Bubbling Under Hot 100 Singles chart.)	—	—	—	—	—	—		Sincerely, Kentrell
"Heart & Soul" (with Birdman)	2021	— (Note: "Heart & Soul" did not chart on the Billboard Hot 100, but peaked at number one on the Bubbling Under Hot 100 Singles chart.)	29	18	—	—	—	—	RIAA: Gold	From the Bayou
"Black Ball" (with Birdman)	2021	93	31	20	—	—	—	—	RIAA: Platinum	From the Bayou
"Long Live"	2022	87	33	24	—	—	—	—		Colors
"Bring It On"	2022	60	19	13	—	—	—	182	RIAA: Gold	Colors
"No Switch"	2022	58	16	11	—	—	—	171	RIAA: Platinum	Colors
"Smoke One"	2022	97	40	—	—	—	—	—		Colors
"2Hoo"	2022	86	32	23	—	—	—	—		Colors
"DC Marvel"	2022	— (Note: "DC Marvel" did not chart on the Billboard Hot 100, but peaked at number 19 on the Bubbling Under Hot 100 chart.)	—	—	—	—	—	—		Colors
"How You Been"	2022	— (Note: "How You Been" did not chart on the Billboard Hot 100, but peaked at number 10 on the Bubbling Under Hot 100 chart.)	50	—	—	—	—	—		Colors
"Expensive Taste"	2022	— (Note: "Expensive Taste" did not chart on the Billboard Hot 100, but peaked at number four on the Bubbling Under Hot 100 chart.)	44	—	—	—	—	—		Colors
"Cage Feeling"	2022	— (Note: "Cage Feeling" did not chart on the Billboard Hot 100, but peaked at number 16 on the Bubbling Under Hot 100 chart.)	—	—	—	—	—	—		Colors
"Dis & That"	2022	89	35	—	—	—	—	—	RIAA: Gold	Colors
"Gangsta" (featuring Quando Rondo)	2022	— (Note: "Gangsta" did not chart on the Billboard Hot 100, but peaked at number nine on the Bubbling Under Hot 100 chart.)	49	—	—	—	—	—		Colors
"Know Like I Know"	2022	74	29	22	—	—	—	—	RIAA: Gold	Colors
"Emo Rockstar"	2022	— (Note: "Emo Rockstar" did not chart on the Billboard Hot 100, but peaked at number 11 on the Bubbling Under Hot 100 Singles chart.)	—	—	—	—	—	—		Colors
"I Got This"	2022	— (Note: "I Got This" did not chart on the Billboard Hot 100, but peaked at number 21 on the Bubbling Under Hot 100 chart.)	—	—	—	—	—	—		Colors
"On This Line" (with DaBaby)	2022	— (Note: "On This Line" did not enter the Billboard Hot 100, but peaked at number 15 on the Bubbling Under Hot 100 chart.)	—	—	—	—	—	—		Better than You
"WiFi" (with DaBaby)	2022	— (Note: "WiFi" did not enter the Billboard Hot 100, but peaked at number 19 on the Bubbling Under Hot 100 chart.)	—	—	—	—	—	—		Better than You
"Turbo" (with DaBaby)	2022	— (Note: "Turbo" did not enter the Billboard Hot 100, but peaked at number five on the Bubbling Under Hot 100 chart.)	46	—	—	—	—	—		Better than You
"I Know"	2022	46	13	11	—	—	—	195	RIAA: Gold	The Last Slimeto
"Hold Your Own"	2022	87	28	23	—	—	—	—		The Last Slimeto
"Umm Hmm"	2022	37	11	9	—	—	—	119	RIAA: Gold	The Last Slimeto
"Top Sound"	2022	86	30	25	—	—	—	—		The Last Slimeto
"My Time"	2022	90	34	—	—	—	—	—		The Last Slimeto
"Free Dem 5's"	2022	68	23	19	—	—	—	—		The Last Slimeto
"My Go To" (featuring Kehlani)	2022	— (Note: "My Go To" did not chart on the Billboard Hot 100, but peaked at number one on the Bubbling Under Hot 100 Singles chart.)	39	—	—	—	—	—		The Last Slimeto
"Lost Soul Survivor"	2022	75	25	21	—	—	—	—		The Last Slimeto
"Fuck da Industry"	2022	63	20	18	—	—	—	—		The Last Slimeto
"Kamikaze"	2022	88	32	—	—	—	—	—		The Last Slimeto
"Swerving"	2022	— (Note: "Swerving" did not chart on the Billboard Hot 100, but peaked at number 10 on the Bubbling Under Hot 100 Singles chart.)	50	—	—	—	—	—		The Last Slimeto
"Stay the Same"	2022	— (Note: "Stay the Same" did not chart on the Billboard Hot 100, but peaked at number five on the Bubbling Under Hot 100 Singles chart.)	45	—	—	—	—	—		The Last Slimeto
"Home Ain't Home" (featuring Rod Wave)	2022	47	14	12	—	—	—	181	RIAA: Gold	The Last Slimeto
"7 Days"	2022	100	38	—	—	—	—	—		The Last Slimeto
"Digital"	2022	— (Note: "Digital" did not chart on the Billboard Hot 100, but peaked at number two on the Bubbling Under Hot 100 Singles chart.)	41	—	—	—	—	—		The Last Slimeto
"Slow Down"	2022	— (Note: "Slow Down" did not chart on the Billboard Hot 100, but peaked at number 18 on the Bubbling Under Hot 100 Singles chart.)	—	—	—	—	—	—		The Last Slimeto
"Proof"	2022	— (Note: "Proof" did not chart on the Billboard Hot 100, but peaked at number eight on the Bubbling Under Hot 100 Singles chart.)	48	—	—	—	—	—		The Last Slimeto
"4KT Baby"	2022	96	30	24	—	—	—	—		The Last Slimeto
"The North Bleeding"	2022	— (Note: "The North Bleeding" did not chart on the Billboard Hot 100, but peaked at number seven on the Bubbling Under Hot 100 Singles chart.)	46	—	—	—	—	—		The Last Slimeto
"Loner Life"	2022	— (Note: "Loner Life" did not chart on the Billboard Hot 100, but peaked at number two on the Bubbling Under Hot 100 Singles chart.)	37	—	—	—	—	—	RIAA: Gold	The Last Slimeto
"Acclaimed Emotions"	2022	— (Note: "Acclaimed Emotions" did not chart on the Billboard Hot 100, but peaked at number 10 on the Bubbling Under Hot 100 Singles chart.)	49	—	—	—	—	—		The Last Slimeto
"Wagwan"	2022	— (Note: "Wagwan" did not chart on the Billboard Hot 100, but peaked at number four on the Bubbling Under Hot 100 Singles chart.)	41	—	—	—	—	—		The Last Slimeto
"Holy"	2022	— (Note: "Holy" did not chart on the Billboard Hot 100, but peaked at number 25 on the Bubbling Under Hot 100 Singles chart.)	—	—	—	—	—	—		The Last Slimeto
"I Got the Bag"	2022	— (Note: "I Got the Bag" did not chart on the Billboard Hot 100, but peaked at number 19 on the Bubbling Under Hot 100 Singles chart.)	—	—	—	—	—	—	RIAA: Gold	The Last Slimeto
"Dangerous Love"	2022	— (Note: "Dangerous Love" did not chart on the Billboard Hot 100, but peaked at number 21 on the Bubbling Under Hot 100 Singles chart.)	46	—	—	—	—	—		Realer 2
"Purge Me"	2022	95	30	23	—	—	—	—		Realer 2
"Back on My Feet"	2022	— (Note: "Back on My Feet" did not chart on the Billboard Hot 100, but peaked at number four on the Bubbling Under Hot 100 Singles chart.)	35	—	—	—	—	—		3800 Degrees
"Won't Step on Me"	2022	— (Note: "Won't Step on Me" did not chart on the Billboard Hot 100, but peaked at number 15 on the Bubbling Under Hot 100 Singles chart.)	42	—	—	—	—	—		3800 Degrees
"Pimpin a Bitch"	2022	— (Note: "Pimpin a Bitch" did not chart on the Billboard Hot 100, but peaked at number 19 on the Bubbling Under Hot 100 Singles chart.)	45	—	—	—	—	—		3800 Degrees
"To the Bone" (with Quavo and Takeoff)	2022	83	24	—	—	—	32	—		Only Built for Infinity Links
"Pop Out"	2022	— (Note: "Pop Out" did not chart on the Billboard Hot 100, but peaked at number 21 on the Bubbling Under Hot 100 Singles chart.)	—	—	—	—	—	—		Ma' I Got a Family
"I Admit" (featuring Nicki Minaj)	2022	— (Note: "I Admit" did not chart on the Billboard Hot 100, but peaked at number eight on the Bubbling Under Hot 100 Singles chart.)	42	—	—	—	—	—		Ma' I Got a Family
"Shmunk" (Yeat featuring YoungBoy Never Broke Again)	2023	83	29	18	—	100	27	—		Afterlyfe
"Big Truck"	2023	100	28	18	—	—	—	—		Don't Try This at Home
"Mr Gaulden"	2023	— (Note: "Mr Gaulden" did not chart on the Billboard Hot 100, but peaked at number 14 on the Bubbling Under Hot 100 Singles chart.)	39	—	—	—	—	—		Don't Try This at Home
"What You Say" (featuring the Kid Laroi and Post Malone)	2023	—	47	—	—	—	—	—		Don't Try This at Home
"Bitch Let's Do It"	2023	62	17	10	—	—	—	—	RIAA: Platinum	Richest Opp
"I Got That Shit"	2023	— (Note: "I Got That Shit" did not chart on the Billboard Hot 100, but peaked at number one on the Bubbling Under Hot 100 Singles chart.)	32	22	—	—	—	—		Richest Opp
"I Heard"	2023	98	31	21	—	—	—	—		Richest Opp
"Hurt My Heart"	2023	— (Note: "Hurt My Heart" did not chart on the Billboard Hot 100, but peaked at number nine on the Bubbling Under Hot 100 Singles chart.)	34	23	—	—	—	—		Richest Opp
"Dirty Thug"	2023	— (Note: "Dirty Thug" did not chart on the Billboard Hot 100, but peaked at number ten on the Bubbling Under Hot 100 Singles chart.)	35	24	—	—	—	—		Richest Opp
"Just Flow"	2023	—	50	—	—	—	—	—		Richest Opp
"Free Meechy"	2023	—	43	—	—	—	—	—		Richest Opp
"Fuck the Industry Pt. 2"	2023	87	28	18	—	—	—	—		Richest Opp
"Free Sex"	2023	— (Note: "Free Sex" did not chart on the Billboard Hot 100, but peaked at number 25 on the Bubbling Under Hot 100 Singles chart.)	42	—	—	—	—	—		Decided 2
"Better Than Ever" (with Rod Wave)	2023	99	25	—	—	—	—	—		Decided 2
"MASA"	2025	—	42	—	—	—	—	—		MASA
"Kickboxer"	2025	— (Note: "Kickboxer" did not chart on the Billboard Hot 100, but peaked at number 23 on the Bubbling Under Hot 100 chart.)	29	21	—	—	—	—		MASA
"When Time Pass"	2025	—	45	—	—	—	—	—		MASA
"Priorities"	2025	—	43	—	—	—	—	—		MASA
"Peepin"	2025	—	40	—	—	—	—	—		MASA
"Diesel"	2025	—	44	—	—	—	—	—		MASA
"Outside" (with Travis Scott)	2025	— (Note: "Outside" did not chart on the Billboard Hot 100, but peaked at number 19 on the Bubbling Under Hot 100 Singles chart.)	—	—	—	—	—	—		JackBoys 2
"Games of War"	2025	—	46	—	—	—	—	—		MASA
"Fire Your Manager" (with Playboi Carti)	2025	— (Note: "Fire Your Manager" did not chart on the Billboard Hot 100, but peaked at number 11 on the Bubbling Under Hot 100 chart.)	34	20	—	—	35	—		MASA
"Wine & Dine"	2025	— (Note: "Wine & Dine" did not chart on the Billboard Hot 100, but peaked at number 7 on the Bubbling Under Hot 100 chart.)	23	18	—	—	—	—		MASA
"Pills" (Offset featuring YoungBoy Never Broke Again)	2025	—	35	—	—	—	—	—		Kiari
"Mask and Gloves"	2026	— (Note: "Mask and Gloves" did not chart on the Billboard Hot 100, but peaked at number 5 on the Bubbling Under Hot 100 chart.)	38	—	—	—	—	—		Slime Cry
"Another Episode"	2026	83	29	22	—	—	—	—		Slime Cry
"Anti-Social"	2026	90	33	—	—	—	—	—		Slime Cry
"Headtap"	2026	80	27	20	—	—	—	—		Slime Cry
"Me and You"	2026	— (Note: "Me and You" did not chart on the Billboard Hot 100, but peaked at number 10 on the Bubbling Under Hot 100 chart.)	41	—	—	—	—	—		Slime Cry
"My Life I Apologize"	2026	— (Note: "My Life I Apologize" did not chart on the Billboard Hot 100, but peaked at number 12 on the Bubbling Under Hot 100 chart.)	43	—	—	—	—	—		Slime Cry
"Teary Eyes" (with Burna Boy)	2026	— (Note: "Teary Eyes" did not chart on the Billboard Hot 100, but peaked at number 23 on the Bubbling Under Hot 100 chart.)	46	—	—	—	—	—		Slime Cry
"For You"	2026	— (Note: "For You" did not chart on the Billboard Hot 100, but peaked at number 11 on the Bubbling Under Hot 100 chart.)	42	—	—	—	—	—		Slime Cry
"Bruce Wayne"	2026	57	16	9	—	—	—	—		Slime Cry
"FWYT"	2026	— (Note: "FWYT" did not chart on the Billboard Hot 100, but peaked at number 14 on the Bubbling Under Hot 100 chart.)	45	—	—	—	—	—		Slime Cry
"Ganja"	2026	— (Note: "Ganja" did not chart on the Billboard Hot 100, but peaked at number 25 on the Bubbling Under Hot 100 chart.)	41	—	—	—	—	—		ML2
"—" denotes a recording that did not chart or was not released in that territory.

== Guest appearances ==
List of non-single guest appearances, with other performing artists, showing year released and album name
Title	Year	Other performer(s)	Album
"Reckless"	2017	Moneybagg Yo	Federal 3X
"Ride"	2018	Birdman	Before Anythang
"NBAYoungBoat"	2018	Lil Yachty	Lil Boat 2
"3AM"	2018	Trill Sammy, Cashmere Cat	No Sleep Vol.1
"Elevate & Motivate"	2018	Trippie Redd, Nel-Denarro	A Love Letter to You 3
"666"	2018	YG	Stay Dangerous
"Where We Come From"	2018	Shy Glizzy	Fully Loaded
"Can't Go Back"	2018	SOB X RBE	Gangin II
"Never Broke Again"	2018	Young Scooter	The Recipe
"Cold Shoulder"	2018	Gucci Mane	Evil Genius
"For Keeps"	2019	Rich the Kid	The World Is Yours 2
"Trust"	2019	The Plug, Loski, Nafe Smallz	Plug Talk
"Hot Boy"	2019	BBG Baby Joe, Birdman, 9lokkNine	B4 Its All Said & Done
"Hate Me"	2019	Trippie Redd	A Love Letter to You 4
"Racks On"	2020	Rich the Kid	Boss Man
"Jump"	2020	DaBaby	Blame It on Baby
"Tragic"	2020	The Kid Laroi, Internet Money	F*ck Love (Savage)
"Save Me"	2020	2 Chainz	So Help Me God!
"So Real"	2020	French Montana	CB5
"Hood Melody"	2021	DDG, OG Parker	Die 4 Respect
"10 Bracelets"	2022	2 Chainz	Dope Don't Sell Itself
"Flags To The Sky"	2022	NoCap	Mr. Crawford
"Sexin Me"	2022	—N/a	Never Broke Again Presents: Green Flag Activity
"Never Ran"	2022	Rojay MLP	Never Broke Again Presents: Green Flag Activity
"O.P.P."	2022	The Game, DJ Paul	Drillmatic – Heart vs. Mind
"Amazing"	2022	P Yungin	DOY
"To the Bone"	2022	Quavo, Takeoff	Only Built for Infinity Links
"With Me"	2022	—N/a	Never Broke Again: Nightmare on 38th St
"Far Away"	2022	Bway Yungy	Success Before Destruction
"Shmunk"	2023	Yeat	Afterlyfe
"I Don't Mind"	2023	Lil Pump	Lil Pump 2
"Too Gone"	2023	RJAE	You’re the Problem
"Slump"	2023	—N/a	Never Broke Again Presents: Green Flag Activity, Vol. 2
"I Need to Know"	2023	—N/a	Never Broke Again Presents: Green Flag Activity, Vol. 2
"Call Me Instead"	2023	The Kid Laroi, Robert Glasper	The First Time
"Get My Life Right"	2023	E-40	Rule of Thumb: Rule 1
"Mad Love"	2024	Jason Derulo	Nu King
"Bling"	2024	Lil Dump	Compliments of Grave Digger Mountain
"My Bobo"	2024	Herm Tha Blacksheep	Compliments of Grave Digger Mountain
"How We Get"	2024	Lil Dump, Dej RoseGold, WhoGangDee	Compliments of Grave Digger Mountain
"Hurt"	2024	BBG Baby Joe	Compliments of Grave Digger Mountain
"New New"	2024	—N/a	Compliments of Grave Digger Mountain
"When We Slide"	2024	DDawg	Compliments of Grave Digger Mountain
"Try Me"	2024	WhoGangDee	
"Outside"	2025	Travis Scott	JackBoys 2
"I Am"	2025	Kevin Gates	Luca Brasi 4
"I Wanna Win"	2025	2 Chainz	Red Clay (Official Motion Picture Soundtrack)
"Pills"	2025	Offset	Kiari
"2 Crash Outs"	2025	Pluto	Pluto World
"Switches"	2025	Boosie Badazz	225 Business
"Creep"	2025	Boosie Badazz	225 Business
"Head Bussas"	2025	Boosie Badazz	225 Business
"Ain't a Game"	2025	Boosie Badazz	225 Business
"Desperado"	2025	Boosie Badazz	225 Business
"Murda Man"	2025	Boosie Badazz	225 Business
"She Want Some"	2025	Boosie Badazz	225 Business
"Sorry"	2025	Boosie Badazz	225 Business
"Shit we Ride To"	2025	Boosie Badazz	225 Business
"Hold Up"	2025	Boosie Badazz, Tootie Raw	225 Business
"Have You Ever"	2025	Boosie Badazz	225 Business
"Dead"	2025	Boosie Badazz	225 Business
"Southern Smoke"	2025	Boosie Badazz	225 Business
"225 Outro"	2025	Boosie Badazz	225 Business
"Masked Up"	2026	Nettspend	Early Life Crisis
"Red Rum"	2026	Chris Brown	Brown

== Music videos ==
List of music videos, showing year released and directors
Title	Year	Director
As lead artist
"N.B.A"	2015	Papercut Brothers
"38 Baby"	2016	David G
"Fact"	2016	David G
"Murder"	2016	David G
"Homicide" (with Scotty Cain)	2016	David G
"Bandz"	2016	David G
"Dream"	2016	David G
"Rod" (with 4TM Fru and Pretty Tony)	2016	David G
"So Long"	2016	David G
"What I Was Taught"	2016	N/A
"Until Then"	2016	N/A
"I Ain't Hiding"	2016	David G
"Kickin Shit"	2016	Directed by Mak
"Murder (Remix)" (featuring 21 Savage)	2016	David G
"Down Chick"	2016	Shot By Miggy
"Win Or Lose"	2016	On The Reel Films
"Untouchable"	2017	David G
"41"	2017	David G
"Graffiti"	2017	David G
"No Smoke"	2017	David G
"Watchu Gone Do" (featuring Peewee Longway)	2017	N/A
"Talkin Shit"	2017	Karltin Bank and Cotton Films
"Ride"	2017	N/A
"Confidential"	2017	Cody Coyote Films
"Chosen One" (featuring Kodak Black)	2017	David G
"Solar Eclipse"	2018	David G
"Outside Today"	2018	RisktakerZ
"Diamond Teeth Samurai"	2018	N/A
"Through The Storm"	2018	30Thirty Visuals
"Genie"	2018	30Thirty Visuals
"Overdose"	2018	David G
"We Poppin" (featuring Birdman)	2018	Derek Dark and Preston
"Astronaut Kid"	2018	N/A
"Drawing Symbols"	2018	Lucid Films
"Dropout"	2018	Lucid Films
"No Mentions"	2018	Louie Knows
"Demon Seed"	2018	HalfPint
"I Am Who They Say I Am" (featuring Kevin Gates and Quando Rondo)	2018	Louie Knows
"Blasian"	2018	Louie Knows
"Dope Lamp"	2018	Louie Knows
"Hypnotized"	2018	Louie Knows
"Valuable Pain"	2018	Louie Knows
"I Came Thru"	2018	Louie Knows
"Kick Yo Door"	2019	ShotByJacques
"Slime Belief"	2019	ShotByJacques
"Scenes" (featuring PnB Rock)	2019	Louie Knows
"FreeDDawg"	2019	Louie Knows
"Slime Mentality"	2019	WeGoodProductions
"Self Control"	2019	Louie Knows
"House Arrest Tingz"	2019	Louie Knows
"Bandit" (with Juice WRLD)	2019	Cole Bennett
"In Control"	2019	N/A
"Carter Son"	2019	E Buckles
"Lost Motives"	2019	Louie Knows
"Bring 'Em Out"	2019	Karltin Bankz
"Dirty Iyanna"	2019	Louie Knows
"Make No Sense"	2020	Louie Knows
"Talk My Shit" (with Meechy Baby)	2020	Louie Knows
"Fine By Time"	2020	Karltin Bankz
"Bad Bad"	2020	Rich Porter
"Lil Top"	2020	Louie Knows
"Ten Talk"	2020	Rich Porter, Adrian Scuilli
"Drop'Em"	2020	Rich Porter, Krispy Kam
"Uncharted Love"	2020	N/A
"AI Nash"	2020	Cole Bennett
"Step On Shit"	2020	Rich Porter
Death Enclaimed"	2020	Rich Porter
"Sticks With Me"	2020	Rich Porter
"All In"	2020	Rich Porter
"Kacey Talk"	2020	Rich Porter
"Murder Business"	2020	Rich Porter
"Callin" (featuring Snoop Dogg)	2020	Rich Porter
"Dead Trollz"	2020	Rich Porter
"Peace Hardly"	2020	FlyGuyNick
"The Story of O.J. (Top Version)"	2020	Rich Porter and Krispy Kam
"Around"	2020	Rich Porter
"Thrasher"	2020	Rich Porter
"How I Been"	2020	Rich Porter
"Green Dot"	2020	Rich Porter
"It Ain’t Over (Interlude)"	2020	Rich Porter
"I Ain't Scared"	2021	N/A
"White Teeth"	2021	Picture Perfect
"Life Support"	2021	Rich Porter
"On My Side"	2021	Mike Marasco
"Break or Make Me"	2021	Louie Knows
"Kickstand"	2021	Rich Porter and FlyGuyNick
"Heart & Soul / Alligator Walk"	2021	FlyGuyNick
"Black Ball"	2021	FlyGuyNick
"100 Rounds" (with Birdman)	2021	FlyGuyNick
"Emo Rockstar"	2022	FlyGuyNick
"Fish Scale"	2022	FlyGuyNick
"Bring It On"	2022	FlyGuyNick
"No Switch"	2022	FlyGuyNick
"Hit" (with DaBaby)	2022	YoungBoy Never Broke Again, DaBaby
"Neighborhood Superstar" (with DaBaby)	2022	FlyGuyNick
"I Got the Bag"	2022	FlyGuyNick
"Holy"	2022	FlyGuyNick
"Bestie" (with DaBaby)	2022	DaBaby
"4KT Baby"	2022	Rich Porter
"Loner Life"	2022	FlyGuyNick
"See Me Now"	2022	Rich Porter
"Proud of Myself"	2022	Rich Porter
"Goals"	2022	Rich Porter
"Vette Motors"	2022	Louie Knows
"Late to da Party" (with Lil Nas X)	2022	Gibson Hazard
"Feel Good"	2022	Louie Knows
"I Don't Talk"	2022	Isaac Garcia
"Change"	2022	Isaac Garcia
"She Want Chanel"	2022	Isaac Garcia
"I Know"	2022	Isaac Garcia
"Digital"	2022	Isaac Garcia
"Proof"	2022	Louie Knows
"Purge Me"	2022	Isaac Garcia
"Put It on Me"	2022	Isaac Garcia
"Like A Jungle (Out Numbered)"	2022	Isaac Garcia
"Made Rich"	2022	Isaac Garcia
"Hi Haters"	2022	Isaac Garcia
"Black"	2023	FlyGuyNick
"Next"	2023	Isaac Garcia
"Demon Party"	2023	Isaac Garcia
"WTF" (with Nicki Minaj)	2023	Isaac Garcia
"Rear View" (with Mariah the Scientist)	2023	Isaac Garcia
"What You Say" (with The Kid Laroi and Post Malone)	2023	Isaac Garcia
"Big Truck"	2023	N/A
"Bitch Let's Do It"	2023	N/A
"I Need to Know"	2023	N/A
"Testimony"	2023	Karltin Bankz
"Heard of Me"	2023	Karltin Bankz
"Deep Down"	2023	Karltin Bankz
"Return of Goldie"	2023	Isaac Garcia
"Slime Examination"	2023	N/A
"Guapi"	2023	N/A
"Guitar Hero"	2023	N/A
"My Address Public"	2023	Nick Eldredge
"Act a Donkey"	2024	Richy Rae
"Bnyx Da Reaper"	2024	Nick Eldredge
"We shot him in his head huh"	2024	N/A
"Fuck Niggaz"	2024	SlaterShotEm
"Closed Case"	2024	SlaterShotEm
"No Time"	2024	SlaterShotEm
"Steppa"	2024	HoodRichKevin
"Boat"	2024	HoodRichKevin
"My BoBo" (with Herm Tha Blacksheep)	2024	SlaterShotEm
"Catch Him"	2024	N/A
"Never Stopping"	2024	N/A
"Catch Me"	2024	Chris Allen
"Missing Everything"	2024	Richy Rae
"Sneaking"	2024	N/A
"Killa Season"	2024	Richy Rae
"Where I Been / Shot Callin"	2025	FlyGiyNick
"Finest"	2025	Rozay Evans
"Top Tingz"	2025	Rozay Evans
"Diesel / Over"	2025	Rich Porter
"Kickboxer"	2025	Rich Porter
"So Not Sorry / Out The Window"	2025	Rich Porter and Creator Chris
"Fuck the Drugs"	2025	Rich Porter and Creative Cartel
"XXX"	2025	Merry
"I Forgive Them"	2025	Creator Chris, Rich Porter, and Creative Cartel
"Nussie"	2025	Rich Porter and Creative Cartel
"What You Is" (with Mellow Rackz)	2025	Rich Porter
"Shark"	2025	Rich Porter
"Please Don't Go" (with Toosii)	2025	Rich Porter
"Zero IQ Freestyle"	2025	—N/a
"BossManeDlow (Top Mix)"	2025	CreatorChris
"Top Cobain"	2025	Rich Porter
As featured artist
"Reckless" (Moneybagg Yo featuring YoungBoy Never Broke Again)	2017	Wikid Films
"Check Callin'" (Plies featuring YoungBoy Never Broke Again)	2017	Plies, Omar The Director
"New Money" (Spacejam Bo featuring YoungBoy Never Broke Again)	2017	JSquared
"Doin Bad" (OMB Peezy featuring YoungBoy Never Broke Again)	2017	Alfy
"Beast Mode" (A Boogie wit da Hoodie featuring YoungBoy Never Broke Again and PnB Rock)	2017	Travis Montgomery
"16" (Jamie Ray featuring YoungBoy Never Broke Again)	2017	David G
"Ride" (Birdman featuring YoungBoy Never Broke Again)	2018	Yung Mik3
"3AM" (Trill Sammy featuring YoungBoy Never Broke Again and Cashmere Cat)	2018	Lonewolf
"For Keeps" (Rich the Kid featuring YoungBoy Never Broke Again)	2019	Arrad Rahgoshay
"Jump" (DaBaby featuring YoungBoy Never Broke Again)	2020	Reel Goats
"Racks On" (Rich the Kid featuring YoungBoy Never Broke Again)	2020	Louie Knows
"Need It (Migos featuring YoungBoy Never Broke Again)	2020	Migos, Wyatt Winfrey
"So Real" (French Montana featuring YoungBoy Never Broke Again)	2020	Till Avision, Max Renn, Virtual Girl
"Tragic" (The Kid Laroi featuring YoungBoy Never Broke Again and Internet Money)	2020	Steve Cannon
"Hood Melody" (DDG and OG Parker featuring YoungBoy Never Broke Again)	2021	Reel Goats
"Pull Up Actin" (Never Broke Again featuring YoungBoy Never Broke Again and P Yungin)	2022	Rich Porter, Trilla Visuals
"Gang Baby" (Never Broke Again featuring YoungBoy Never Broke Again, P Yungin, Rojay MLP and RJAE)	2022	Rich Porter
"All my Shit is Stupid" (iLoveMakonnen featuring YoungBoy Never Broke Again)	2022	JxshMadeIt
"2Tone" (Cootie featuring YoungBoy Never Broke Again)	2022	Teedray
"Military" (Rich Gang featuring YoungBoy Never Broke Again and D-Rok)	2022	N/A
"Fools Fall N Love" (Shy Glizzy featuring YoungBoy Never Broke Again)	2023	N/A
"Members Only" (Zayel featuring YoungBoy Never Broke Again)	2023	Isaac Garcia
"Won't Back Down" (Bailey Zimmerman and Dermot Kennedy featuring YoungBoy Never Broke Again)	2023	Chris Allen
"In N Out" (Susie B featuring YoungBoy Never Broke Again)	2023	Karltin Bankz
"Parasites" (iLoveMakonnen featuring YoungBoy Never Broke Again)	2023	Karltin Bankz
"Crazy Girl P2" (Bktherula featuring YoungBoy Never Broke Again)	2023	Isaac Garcia
"No Fake Love" (Queen Naija featuring YoungBoy Never Broke Again)	2023	Sara Lacombe
"FYN" (Tre Savage featuring YoungBoy Never Broke Again)	2024	The Creative Cartel and Shokan Visuals
"Swear" (J.K. Mac featuring YoungBoy Never Broke Again)	2024	W. Michael
"LLOGClay" (T.I. featuring YoungBoy Never Broke Again)	2024	Tip Harris and MJ Whitaker
"Why Oh Why" (Sean Kingston featuring YoungBoy Never Broke Again)	2024	Johnathan Pratt
"Guys Just Wanna Have Fun" (Mellow Rackz featuring YoungBoy Never Broke Again)	2025	Rich Porter
"Fuck That Nigga" (with Birdman and Herm Tha Blacksheep)	2025	Rich Porter
