= No Switch =

2022 song by YoungBoy Never Broke Again

Song by YoungBoy Never Broke Again

from the album Colors
- Released: January 21, 2022
- Genre: Gangsta rap; trap
- Length: 3:00
- Label: Never Broke Again; Atlantic
- Songwriters: Kentrell Gaulden; Jason Goldberg; Giovanni Gardner; Brian Stewart
- Producers: BboyBeatz; GorillaOnThaTrack; Cheese; Tayo

Music video
- "No Switch" on YouTube

"No Switch" is a song by American rapper YoungBoy Never Broke Again, released on January 21, 2022, as the third track from his seventeenth mixtape, Colors. In the song, YoungBoy utilizes his raspy voice with a murderous, aggressive cadence as he raps about murder and firearms.

== Composition ==
In "No Switch," YoungBoy raps about murder, firearms, ammunition, and firearm attachments such as a switch. Rapping about his dead friends, YoungBoy leaves subliminal disses towards Lil Durk and King Von, similarly to what he does on Bring the Hook and Fish Scale.

== Critical reception ==
Pitchfork's Paul A. Thompson opened his review by noting that the mixtape "opens with a predictably furious suite" and ends his review stating that the song "culminates with closing ad-libs." Anthony Malone from HipHopDX writes that on the song, YoungBoy "continues to bait his opps" and that the track is "nearly foaming at the mouth like a rabid dog for a showdown."

== Personnel ==
Credits and personnel adapted from Tidal.

Musicians

- Jason Michael Goldberg – composer, songwriter
- Brian Stewart – production, composer, songwriter
- Giovanni Gardner – production, composer, songwriter
- Kentrell DeSean Gaulden – lead artist, songwriter, composer

Technical

- Cheese – mastering engineer
- Cheese – mixing engineer
- Cheese – recording engineer

== Charts ==
Chart (2022)	Peak position
Global 200 (Billboard)	171
US Billboard Hot 100	58
US Hot R&B/Hip-Hop Songs (Billboard)	16

== Certifications ==
Region	Certification	Certified units/sales
United States (RIAA)	Platinum	1,000,000^{‡}
^{‡} Sales+streaming figures based on certification alone.
