= I Just Got a Lot on My Shoulders =

Studio album by YoungBoy Never Broke Again
- Released: December 6, 2024
- Genre: Southern hip-hop
- Length: 46:43
- Label: Never Broke Again; Motown
- Producer: 17OnDaTrack; 4reign; Al Geno; Ayo Bleu; AyoCBass; Beezo; Berge.af; Bnyx; Cheese; Decastro; D-Roc; Fxlkes; Haze; JB Sauced Up; Kajro; LastWordBeats; Louie Montana; Lovesick; MalikOTB; Manuel No. 1; Michael Makho; OG Parker; PlayboyXO; Samabaretta; Sauceboy; Say Terrelle; Shop with Ken; Simo Fre; Skolo; Str8cash; TayTayMadeIt; TnTXD; Trill; Xclusive

YoungBoy Never Broke Again chronology
Decided 2 (2023)	I Just Got a Lot on My Shoulders (2024)	More Leaks (2025)

I Just Got a Lot on My Shoulders is the seventh studio album by American rapper YoungBoy Never Broke Again, released through Never Broke Again and Motown on December 6, 2024. It features no guest appearances, while its production was handled by YoungBoy's go-to engineer and producer Cheese, Al Geno, Ayo Bleu, Bnyx, D-Roc, OG Parker, PlayboyXO, TayTayMadeIt, and several other producers.

The album follows his twenty-first mixtape, Decided 2, and his sixth studio album, Don't Try This at Home (both 2023). In contrast to his previous studio albums, I Just Got A Lot on My Shoulders was commercially unsuccessful, peaking at number 153 on the Billboard 200 — becoming his lowest-charting release on the chart since his eighth solo mixtape, Ain't Too Long (2017). Critically, the album did not fare better than his previous two albums with Motown.

== Release and promotion ==
On December 25, 2023, during an interview with Million Dollaz Worth of Game, Gaulden stated that his next album would complete his contract with Motown. On January 27, 2024, Gaulden took to his Instagram to tease a new album that would drop on April 19 before sharing another teaser two days later and posting the album's trailer the following day. On March 17, Gaulden shared the album's official artwork and title, expected to release on April 19. However, just two days before the album's initial release, on April 17, Gaulden was arrested for charges ranging from continuous activity stemming from possession of controlled substances to possession of a deadly (dangerous) weapon and identity fraud. While incarcerated, Gaulden entered a guilty plea for his Baton Rouge federal firearm charge stemming from 2020, before eventually being sentenced to 27 months in prison, resulting in fans believing that the album would be postponed until Gaulden's release.

While incarcerated, Gaulden's iCloud was hacked, resulting in a series of leaks while incarcerated, consisting of music, music videos, vlogs, behind-the-scenes footage, and text messages. Due to the untimely leaks, Gaulden and his management announced on November 8, 2024, that the album would be released on December 6, 2024. Simultaneously, the album's first eight tracks were released on Spotify. On December 4, the final eight songs on the album were revealed after the Never Broke Again Instagram page shared the album's tracklist.

=== Singles ===
Leading up to the original release of the album on April 19, Gaulden released several promotional singles, several of which were expected to originally be on the album. On January 13, 2024, Gaulden released "Act a Donkey", "Bnyx da Reaper" on February 2, "We Shot Him in His Head Huh" on February 4, "Fuck Niggaz" on February 7, "Closed Case" on February 16, "No Time" on February 19, "Steppa" on February 22, "Boat" on February 28, and "Catch Him" on March 28. On June 10, while incarcerated, DJ Akademiks premiered "Tears of War", the album's outro and bonus track, revealing that it was the last song recorded by Gaulden before his untimely arrest. The song was later released to streaming platforms on July 26.

Following Gaulden's arrest, releases came to a stop before his music began to leak. On November 8, 2024, while incarcerated, Gaulden released music videos for "Never Stopping", "Catch Me", "Missing Everything", "Sneaking", and "Killa Season" on YouTube.

== Critical reception ==
Professional ratings
Review scores
Source	Rating
AllMusic	2.5/5 stars
Ratings Game Music	64%

Writing for AllMusic, in a mediocre review, Paul Simpson wrote that "the album lives up to its title" and that Gaulden's "vulnerable yet vengeful style hasn't changed much", stating that "he's essentially just giving his fans what they expect". Ratings Game Music's Quincy wrote that the record "is quintessentially chaotic" and that it "[echoes] the erratic nature of both his artistry and personal life". Quincy continued that on the album, Gaulden is "introspective and vulnerable, hurt and vengeful, and, at times, menacingly aggressive". HotNewHipHop's Elias Andrews wrote that the album "is not a cheerful affair" and that on the record, Gaulden "is feeling the weight of stardom and the weight of his lifestyle", however, "he's able to synthesize it in a manner that's compelling to listen to".

== Track listing ==
I Just Got a Lot on My Shoulders track listing
No.	Title	Writer(s)	Producer(s)	Length
1.	"Versace Shades"	Kentrell Gaulden; Tavian Carter	TayTayMadeIt	2:49
2.	"Never Stopping"	Gaulden; Anass Bouali; Braylen Rembert; Phillip Campbell; Terrelle Francis Jr.	4reign; Ayo Bleu; SauceBoy; Say Terrelle	2:42
3.	"Catch Me"	Gaulden; Daniel Lebrun; Don Kwitflip	D-Roc; Manuel #1	2:24
4.	"Hope You Make It"	Gaulden; Jarrian Thompson	PlayboyXO	2:28
5.	"Sneaking"	Gaulden; Gene Hixon; Kajro; Kwitflip	Al Geno; Kajro; Manuel #1	2:36
6.	"Killa Season"	Gaulden; Lebrun; Myeong Geun Song	D-Roc; Skolo	3:03
7.	"Get It"	Gaulden; Jason Goldberg; Joshua Parker; Bishop Grinnage; Jeremy Bradley; Louie Montana	Cheese; OG Parker; Beezo; JB Sauced Up; Louie Montana	2:53
8.	"Missing Everything"	Gaulden; Benjamin Saint-Fort; Kwitflip	Bnyx; Manuel #1	3:44
9.	"Stealing Out the Trap"	Gaulden; Lebrun; Sven Steenbergen	D-Roc; 17OnDaTrack	3:46
10.	"My Smoke"	Gaulden; Michael Makho; Thomas Horton; Kevin Varol	Michael Makho; TnTXD; Trill	1:53
11.	"Blood on My Soul"	Gaulden; Leburn; Gabriel Decastro; Sebastian Picchioni	D-Roc; Decastro; AyoCBass	3:02
12.	"Adapted"	Gaulden; Michael Roberge; Ethan Hayes; Aaron Hill; Malik Bynoe-Fisher	Berge.af; Haze; LastWordBeats; MalikOTB	1:53
13.	"Ma I Don't Cancel"	Gaulden; Leburn; Simone Di Franco	D-Roc; Simo Fre; Samabaretta	2:44
14.	"My Love"	Gaulden; Kendale Carter	Shop with Ken	1:36
15.	"Cook Dope"	Gaulden; Roberge	Berge.af; Str8cash	3:12
16.	"Tears of War" (bonus)	Gaulden; Ernest Wilson; Bobby Seale; Thomas Callaway-Burton; William Roberts II; Willie Hutchison	No I.D.	5:55
Total length:				46:43

Sample credits

- "Tears of War" contains a sample of "Tears of Joy", written by William Roberts II, Thomas Callaway-Burton, Ernest Wilson, Bobby Seale, and Willie Hutchison, as performed by Rick Ross and CeeLo Green.

== Personnel ==
Credits adapted from Tidal.

Musicians

- YoungBoy Never Broke Again – vocals
- Kaye Fox – additional vocals (16)
- Steve Wyreman – guitar (16)
- Kevin Randolph – keyboards (16)

Technical

- Jason "Cheese" Goldberg – mastering, mixing, recording (3, 7, 8, 10, 14, 16)
- Ray Seay – mixing (16)
- DJ Ryno – Dolby Atmos mixing (9–15)
- YoungBoy Never Broke Again – recording (1, 2, 4–6, 9, 11, 13, 15, 16)
- Carlos Echeverri – recording (12), engineering assistance (1–16)
- Eddie "eMix" Hernández – recording (16)
- Rob Kinelski – recording (16)
- Graham Marsh – recording (16)
- Dee Brown – engineering assistance (16)

== Charts ==
Chart performance for I Just Got a Lot on My Shoulders
Chart (2024)	Peak position
US Billboard 200	159

== See also ==
- 2024 in hip-hop

== Release history ==
Release dates and formats for I Just Got a Lot on My Shoulders
Region	Date	Label(s)	Format(s)	Edition(s)	Ref.
Various	December 6, 2024	Never Broke Again; Motown	Digital download; streaming	Standard	
