= Fish scale (disambiguation) =

Fish scales are the rigid plates on the skin of a fish.

Fish scale may also refer to:

- "Fish Scale" (song), a 2022 song by rapper YoungBoy Never Broke Again
- Fish Scales, a rapper in the group Nappy Roots
- Fishscale, a 2006 album by Ghostface Killah
- "Fish Scale", a 1977 song by The David Grisman Quintet from the eponymous album
- A weighing scale to measure the weight of fish
- Traditional Canadian name for a 5 cent piece
- A texture found on waxless Nordic skis; see Ski wax

== See also ==
- Fish-scale gecko
