= Split (Yeat song) =

2023 song by Yeat

Song by Yeat

from the album Afterlyfe
- Released: February 24, 2023
- Genre: Rage
- Length: 2:23
- Label: Geffen; Field Trip; Twizzy Rich
- Songwriters: Noah Olivier Smith; Chase Dalton Rose; Javier Mercado; Noa Nalu Shelfow
- Producers: ChaseTheMoney; Synthetic; Aunix; Noa Nalu

"Split" is a song by American rapper Yeat, released on February 24, 2023 as a track from his third studio album Afterlyfe (2023). It was produced by ChaseTheMoney, Synthetic, Aunix, and Noa Nalu.

== Charts ==
Chart performance for "Split"
Chart (2023)	Peak position
Canadian Hot 100 (Billboard)	97
Latvia Streaming (LAIPA)	20
Lithuania (AGATA)	43
New Zealand Hot Singles (RMNZ)	23
US Billboard Hot 100	79
US Hot R&B/Hip-Hop Songs (Billboard)	28
