= Tragic (song) =

2020 song by The Kid Laroi featuring YoungBoy Never Broke Again and Internet Money

Song by The Kid Laroi featuring YoungBoy Never Broke Again and Internet Money

from the album F*ck Love (Savage)
- Released: 6 November 2020
- Length: 2:33
- Label: Grade A; Columbia
- Songwriter(s): Charlton Howard; Kentrell Gaulden; Cody Rounds; Nico Baran; Danny Lee Snodgrass Jr.
- Producer(s): Cxdy; Nico Baran; Taz Taylor

Music video
- "Tragic" on YouTube

"Tragic" (stylized in all caps) is a song by Australian rapper and singer the Kid Laroi featuring American rapper YoungBoy Never Broke Again and American music collective Internet Money, released on 6 November 2020 as the third track from the Savage edition of the former's debut mixtape F*ck Love.

== Composition ==
"Tragic" is a "sparse soundtrack of looping snares and high piano keys" which's "beat is off-set and drops in and out of the mix." The song is "carefully arranged so as not to interrupt or distract from each of the vocal deliveries." It's noted that the song is the Kid Laroi's "autobiographical account of how he has made something of himself" and that "he's not so much angry as hurting."

== Music video ==
The accompanying Steve Cannon-directed music video was released on 28 December 2020. Heran Mamo from Billboard compares the Kid Laroi in the video to a modern Robin Hood who steals to give back to his less fortunate family. At the time of the video's release, YoungBoy was incarcerated regarding firearms charges.

== Charts ==
Chart performance for "Tragic"
Chart (2020)	Peak position
Australia (ARIA)	41
Australia Hip Hop/R&B (ARIA)	17
Canada (Canadian Hot 100)	59
Global 200 (Billboard)	110
New Zealand Hot Singles (RMNZ)	2
US Billboard Hot 100	76
US Hot R&B/Hip-Hop Songs (Billboard)	30

== Certifications ==
Certifications for "Tragic"
Region	Certification	Certified units/sales
Australia (ARIA)	Gold	35,000^{‡}
Canada (Music Canada)	Platinum	80,000^{‡}
New Zealand (RMNZ)	Gold	15,000^{‡}
United States (RIAA)	Platinum	1,000,000^{‡}
^{‡} Sales+streaming figures based on certification alone.
