= Afterlyfe =

Studio album by Yeat
- Released: February 24, 2023
- Genres: Trap; rage
- Length: 67:35
- Labels: Geffen; Field Trip; Twizzy Rich
- Producers: 2AAB; AM; Aunix; BeautifulMvn; Bnyx; Bred; Bugz Ronin; ChaseTheMoney; Chef9thegod; Colin Magdamo; DKanee; Dream Awake; Dulio; Jonah Abraham; Kele; Leiso; LL Clawz; Lucid; Lukovic; Noa Nalu; Nuu; Pink; Rision; Sideus; Synthetic; Warpstr; Yeat

Yeat chronology
Lyfe (2022)	Afterlyfe (2023)	2093 (2024)

Afterlyfe (stylized as AftërLyfe) is the third studio album by American rapper Yeat. It was released on February 24, 2023, by Geffen Records, Field Trip Recordings, and Twizzy Rich. The follow-up to his EP Lyfë (2022), it contains a sole guest appearance from YoungBoy Never Broke Again as well as Yeat's alter egos Kranky Kranky & Luh Geeky. The album received mixed reviews from music critics, who praised Noah's new sound, but criticized its style. The album debuted on number four on US Billboard 200, selling 54,000 equivalent units on its first week, while it debuted atop the Billboard Top Rap Albums.

== Background ==
Prior to the album's release, Yeat said the album was not just "regular rap beats. It's a whole different new wave." He also expressed that he did not want "21 features on an album" and wanted "people just hearing me. I don't really need other people on my music"

== Critical reception ==
Professional ratings
Review scores
Source	Rating
Slant Magazine	3/5 stars
AllMusic	3/5 stars

Slant Magazine's Paul Attard noted that the album is "composed of demonic-sounding material with little attention paid to sequencing" and that it's "just Yeat himself slightly pitching his voice up or down an octave—that break up the slowly mounting monotony." Concluding his review, he adds that some tracks "display how one-dimensional his style can get when the material is spread too thin", however, he also notes that "despite these flaws, AftërLyfe confirms that in a sea of blatant copycats, Yeat remains a true original—albeit one who's in desperate need of an editor."

== Track listing ==
AfterLyfe track listing
No.	Title	Writer(s)	Producer(s)	Length
1.	"No More Talk"	Noah Smith; Benjamin Saint-Fort	Bnyx	3:59
2.	"Shmunk" (featuring YoungBoy Never Broke Again)	Smith; Kentrell Gaulden; Liam Barnea; Zion Miller	Pink; Bred	3:50
3.	"Bettr Off"	Smith; Daniel Perez; Arthur Werther	Bugz Ronin; Leiso	3:50
4.	"Rave Party" (featuring Kranky Kranky (Note: Kranky Kranky and Luh Geeky are alter egos used by Yeat.))	Smith; Abdul Moiz	Dulio	3:19
5.	"Nun I'd Change"	Smith; B. Saint Fort; Colin Magdamo	Bnyx; Magdamo	3:31
6.	"Woa...!"	Smith; Moiz; Andres Catellanos	Dulio; Lucid	2:50
7.	"Now" (featuring Luh Geeky)	Smith; B. Saint-Fort; Patrick Saint-Fort	Bnyx; BeautifulMvn	4:32
8.	"Slamm"	Smith; B. Saint Fort; Michael Rigaud	Bnyx; Nuu	2:25
9.	"7 Nightz"	Smith; Moiz; Catellanos	Dulio; Lucid	3:05
10.	"Mean Feen" (featuring Kranky Kranky)	Smith	Lukovic	3:12
11.	"How It Go"	Smith; Pablo Sanchez; Nicolò Castrichini	Dream Awake; Sideus	3:04
12.	"Sum 2 Do"	Smith; B. Saint-Fort; P. Saint-Fort	Bnyx; BeautifulMvn	2:33
13.	"Back Up"	Smith; Robert Jurado	Rision	2:13
14.	"Split"	Smith; Chase Rose; Javier Mercado; Noa Nalu Shelfow	ChaseTheMoney; Synthetic; Aunix; Noa Nalu	2:23
15.	"Bad Bend/Demon"	Smith	Yeat	3:02
16.	"Heavyweight"	Smith; Canyon Moore; Ethan Andrade; Arman Andican; Jonah Abraham	Warpstr; AM; Abraham	2:29
17.	"Watch"	Smith	Kele	2:17
18.	"Shhhh"	Smith; Volodymyr Dorofeiev	DKanee	3:14
19.	"Back Home"	Smith; B. Saint-Fort; Gregg Alexander; Danielle Brisebois; Debra Holland	Bnyx	3:31
20.	"Type Money"	Smith; Leonardo Claus; Gonçalo Brás; Zamani Mona	LL Clawz; Chef9thegod; Opium Jai	3:12
21.	"Demon Tied"	Smith; B. Saint-Fort	Bnyx; 2AAB	2:43
22.	"Myself"	Smith; B. Saint-Fort	Bnyx	2:30
Total length:				65:34

Notes

- All songs are stylized in sentence case. In addition, any song title that contains the letter 'e' is replaced with 'ë', with the exception of "Nun I'd Change," which is stylized as "Nun id change." For example, "No More Talk" is stylized as "No morë talk". If a song contains two or more 'e's, then only the first one is replaced, with the exception of "Type Money," which is stylized as "Type monëy." However, "Bettr Off" is stylized as "Bëttr 0ff", "Rave Party" is stylized as "Rav3 p4rty", and "Demon" in "Bad Bend/Demon" is stylized as "DëMON".
- In the tracklist Yeat shared on Instagram, he additionally listed the mobile app Talking Ben as a feature on "How It Go", though this feature was removed prior to the official release of the song.
- "Heavyweight" contains background vocals from SeptembersRich.
- "Myself" contains additional vocals & guitar from Bnyx. Bnyx also played guitar on "Back Home".
- Yeat's alter ego Luh Geeky is styled on Spotify as "Luh geeky," and on Apple Music as "LUH GEEKY."

== Charts ==
=== Weekly charts ===
Weekly chart performance for Afterlyfe
Chart (2023)	Peak position
Australian Albums (ARIA)	58
Austrian Albums (Ö3 Austria)	11
Belgian Albums (Ultratop Flanders)	29
Belgian Albums (Ultratop Wallonia)	157
Canadian Albums (Billboard)	5
Dutch Albums (Album Top 100)	37
Finnish Albums (Suomen virallinen lista)	37
German Albums (Offizielle Top 100)	49
Irish Albums (Official Charts)	25
Lithuanian Albums (AGATA)	2
New Zealand Albums (RMNZ)	17
Norwegian Albums (VG-lista)	10
Swiss Albums (Schweizer Hitparade)	9
UK Albums (Official Charts)	20
US Billboard 200	4
US Top R&B/Hip-Hop Albums (Billboard)	2

=== Year-end charts ===
Year-end chart performance for Afterlyfe
Chart (2023)	Position
US Top R&B/Hip-Hop Albums (Billboard)	79

== Certifications ==
Certifications for Afterlyfe
Region	Certification	Certified units/sales
Poland (ZPAV)	Gold	10,000^{‡}
^{‡} Sales+streaming figures based on certification alone.
