= Flossin' =

2022 single by Internet Money and YoungBoy Never Broke Again

Single by Internet Money and YoungBoy Never Broke Again

from the album Colors
- Released: January 20, 2022
- Length: 2:48
- Label: Internet Money; TenThousand
- Songwriters: Kentrell Gaulden; Danny Snodgrass Jr.; Bryce Frizzell; Jabrielle Brooks; John Mbata; Donny Flores; Travis Nelson Barker
- Producers: Taz Taylor; Bryceunknwn; JRhitmaker; Its2ezzy; Y2Tnb

Internet Money singles chronology
"Drop Shit" (2021)	"Flossin'" (2022)

YoungBoy Never Broke Again singles chronology
"Bring the Hook" (2022)	"Flossin'" (2022)

"Flossin'" is a song by American record collective Internet Money and American rapper YoungBoy Never Broke Again. It was released on January 20, 2022 and is a bonus track from YoungBoy's mixtape Colors (2022). The song was produced by Taz Taylor, Bryceunknwn, JRhitmaker, Its2ezzy and Y2Tnb.

== Composition ==
The instrumental features a "banging, bass heavy canvas" and "glittering, piano-led rhythm". Over it, YoungBoy raps in aggressive and melodic delivery, warning others he is not one to be taken advantage of and flexing his wealth.

== Charts ==
Chart (2022)	Peak position
New Zealand Hot Singles (RMNZ)	25
US Billboard Hot 100	72
US Hot R&B/Hip-Hop Songs (Billboard)	27
