= Heard of Me =

2023 single by YoungBoy Never Broke Again

Single by YoungBoy Never Broke Again
- Released: October 20, 2023
- Length: 3:44
- Label: Never Broke Again; Motown
- Songwriters: Kentrell Gaulden; Kendale Carter
- Producer: $hop With Ken

YoungBoy Never Broke Again singles chronology
"Testimony" (2023)	"Heard of Me" (2023)	"Now Who" (2023)

Music video
- "Heard of Me" on YouTube

"Heard of Me" is a song by American rapper YoungBoy Never Broke Again, first released on September 30, 2023 as a music video before being released to streaming services on October 20, 2023. It was produced by $hop With Ken.

== Content ==
The song finds YoungBoy Never Broke Again rapping about how his career involves a rough life and lack of trust in the industry, but provides enough money for himself. It is believed he also takes shots at rapper J. Cole in response to the latter's song "The Secret Recipe".

== Charts ==
Chart performance for "Heard of Me"
Chart (2023)	Peak position
US Bubbling Under Hot 100 (Billboard)	24
