= Bring It On (YoungBoy Never Broke Again song) =

2022 song by YoungBoy Never Broke Again

Song by YoungBoy Never Broke Again

from the album Colors
- Released: January 21, 2022
- Length: 4:04
- Label: Never Broke Again; Atlantic
- Songwriters: Kentrell Gaulden; Jason Goldberg; Aaron Hill; Daniel Lebrun; Seth Love
- Producers: ProdByBerge; D-Roc; Lastwordbeats; skeeo!

Music video
- "Bring It On" on YouTube

"Bring It On" is a song by American rapper YoungBoy Never Broke Again, released on January 21, 2022, as the second track from his seventeenth mixtape, Colors. The song features a murderous essence that YoungBoy brings as he raps about murder, firearms, and crime.

== Composition ==
In "Bring It On," YoungBoy interpolates his April 2020 "Step on Shit." In the song's bridge following the first verse, YoungBoy also interpolates the 1881 poem, "Ring a Ring o' Roses" as he raps: "Ring around the rosie/Pussy tryna dome me/Know the police on me/They know that they can't clone me/Shawty say she want me/Know that I got money/Say that they don't like me/'Cause I'm always stuntin'."

== Critical reception ==
Pitchfork's Paul A. Thompson noted that the mixtape "opens with a predictably furious suite" and notes that the song "culminates with closing ad-libs." Anthony Malone from HipHopDX writes that on the song, YoungBoy "[tauntes] his enemies, reveling in the fact they want him dead."

== Music video ==
The FlyGuyNick-directed music video was released on January 21, 2022, alongside the official audio. The video sees YoungBoy smoking and dancing with loads of money inside his house with his close friend Herm Tha Blacksheep.

== Personnel ==
Credits and personnel adapted from Tidal.

Musicians

- Jason Michael Goldberg – composer, songwriter
- Aaron Hill – production, composer, songwriter
- Daniel Lebrun – production, composer, songwriter
- Seth Love – production, composer, songwriter
- Kentrell DeSean Gaulden – lead artist, songwriter, composer

Technical

- Cheese – mastering engineer
- Cheese – mixing engineer
- Cheese – recording engineer

== Charts ==
Chart (2022)	Peak position
Global 200 (Billboard)	182
US Billboard Hot 100	60
US Hot R&B/Hip-Hop Songs (Billboard)	19

== Certifications ==
Region	Certification	Certified units/sales
United States (RIAA)	Gold	500,000^{‡}
^{‡} Sales+streaming figures based on certification alone.
