= What You Is =

2025 single by YoungBoy Never Broke Again and Mellow Rackz

Single by YoungBoy Never Broke Again and Mellow Rackz
- Released: September 8, 2025
- Genre: Hip-hop
- Length: 3:46
- Label: Never Broke Again; Motown
- Songwriters: Kentrell Gaulden; Melody Timolien; Devontae Loper; LaBrandon Robinson; Jasper Cortez; Neamu David
- Producers: BlokkOnDa808's; BrandoBeatz; Jippy; Choppyonthebeat

YoungBoy Never Broke Again singles chronology
"I Forgive Them" (2025)	"What You Is" (2025)	"Shark" (2025)

Mellow Rackz singles chronology
"Hip Hop Rebirth" (2025)	"What You Is" (2025)

Music video
- "What You Is" on YouTube

"What You Is" is a single by American rappers YoungBoy Never Broke Again and Mellow Rackz, released on September 9, 2025. It was produced by BlokkOnDa808's, BrandoBeatz, Jippy and Choppyonthebeat.

== Critical reception ==
Chase Iseghohi of Hot 100.9 commented that the song "feels like the perfect storm — YoungBoy's gritty intensity meets Mellow's melodic presence. The chemistry between the two is undeniable, and fans are calling it one of the most refreshing pair-ups of the year."

== Charts ==
Chart performance for "What You Is"
Chart (2025)	Peak position
US Billboard Hot 100	75
US Hot R&B/Hip-Hop Songs (Billboard)	15
