= Shmunk =

2023 song by Yeat featuring YoungBoy Never Broke Again

Song by Yeat featuring YoungBoy Never Broke Again

from the album Afterlyfe
- Released: February 24, 2023
- Genre: Trap
- Length: 3:50
- Label: Geffen Records; Field Trip; Twizzy Rich
- Songwriter(s): Noah Olivier Smith; Kentrell DeSean Gaulden; Liam Barnea; Zion Miller
- Producer(s): Bred; Prod Pink

Audio video
- "Shmunk" on YouTube

"Shmunk" is a song by American rapper Yeat featuring fellow American rapper YoungBoy Never Broke Again, released on February 24, 2023, as the second track from the former's third studio album, Afterlyfe. On the trap banger, Yeat raps for the majority of the track about his exceedingly high income, whereas YoungBoy raps about firearms and murder.

== Composition ==
"Shmunk" employs "a warped bop" with "dancehall beats and melodic acoustic strings also eas[ing] their way into the production".

== Critical reception ==
HotNewHipHop's Caleb Hardy noted that YoungBoy "is the one exception" to Yeat's attempt to "make up for the distinct lack of features by ushering in his alter-personas". On the track, YoungBoy "delivers a much-needed alternative voice". Hardy also noted that Yeat "shows out with braggadocios bars, chiefly about having stacks of cash, buying new cars, and wearing designer brands".

== Charts ==
Chart performance for "Shmunk"
Chart (2023)	Peak position
Canada (Canadian Hot 100)	100
New Zealand Hot Singles (RMNZ)	27
US Billboard Hot 100	83
US Hot R&B/Hip-Hop Songs (Billboard)	29
