= Genie (YoungBoy Never Broke Again song) =

Promotional single by YoungBoy Never Broke Again

from the album Until Death Call My Name
- Released: April 4, 2018
- Length: 3:14
- Label: Never Broke Again
- Songwriters: Kentrell Gaulden; PlayboyXO
- Producer: PlayboyXO

Music video
- "Genie" on YouTube

"Genie" is a song by American rapper YoungBoy Never Broke Again. It was released on April 4, 2018, as a promotional single from his debut studio album Until Death Call My Name (2018), on which it appears as a bonus track, with an accompanying music video.

== Composition and lyrics ==
The song finds NBA YoungBoy discussing his mistakes and legal issues ("I got my static when you ride with me / We got pulled over no you ain't going to do no time for me / I put my hands up police drew down on me / So many charges make me wanna go way over seas"), as well as not being able to "find a woman in the mold of his mother".

== Music video ==
The music video features shots of YoungBoy's arrest in February 2018, and finds him rapping in his front courtyard.

== Charts ==
| Chart (2018) | Peak position |
|---|---|
| US Bubbling Under Hot 100 (Billboard) | 12 |

== Certifications ==
| Region | Certification | Certified units/sales |
|---|---|---|
| United States (RIAA) | 3× Platinum | 3,000,000^{‡} |
^{‡} Sales+streaming figures based on certification alone.
