= Colors (mixtape) =

2022 album by YoungBoy Never Broke Again

Mixtape by YoungBoy Never Broke Again
- Released: January 21, 2022
- Genre: Hip hop; gangsta rap; trap
- Length: 66:51
- Label: Never Broke Again; Atlantic
- Producer: 12Hunna; Amart; Ambezza; BBoyBeatz; BeatsAintFree JG; Beezo Beatz; Berge; Bj Beatz; Blom; BryceUnknwn; Cash; Cheese; Dan; DopeTrademark; Droc; DT; DY Krazy; Ele Beatz; Exavis; FriendsOfClay; GorillaOnThaTrack; Hagan; HicksMadeThat; Hurt; Indiagotthembeats; Its2Ezzy; Jay LV; JRHitmaker; Karltin Bankz; Lastwordbeats; Lastworld; LC; Leor; LondnBlue; Lufye; Luhkim; LVL35Dav; Nick Schmidt; OG Parker; Otxhello; Prod.KpBeats; Saucey Beats; Skeeo; Supah Mario; Tayo; Taz Taylor; Tfisdon; TNTXD; UpNorth; WassupBans; Y2tnb; Yakree; Yo Benji

YoungBoy Never Broke Again chronology
From the Bayou (2021)	Colors (2022)	Better than You (2022)

Singles from Colors
- 1. "Bring the Hook" Released: January 12, 2022

Colors is the sixteenth solo mixtape by American rapper YoungBoy Never Broke Again. It was released through Never Broke Again and Atlantic Records on January 21, 2022. The mixtape features a sole guest appearance from Quando Rondo. The deluxe edition was released on the same day, containing an additional guest appearance from Internet Money. Producer Cheese mixed, mastered, and engineered every track on the standard edition of the mixtape, with Lawrence Rivers also engineering "Gangsta", which features Quando Rondo. For the deluxe edition, "Flossin", his Internet Money collaboration, was mixed by Jeremie Inhaber and Francisco Salcido, mastered by Inhaber, and engineered by Mark Dorflinger. Colors was preceded by its lead single "Bring the Hook".

Commercially, Colors debuted at number two on the US Billboard 200 chart, earning 80,000 album-equivalent units in its first week, becoming YoungBoy's eighth top-ten album on the chart.

== Release and promotion ==
On January 5, 2022, YoungBoy released the promotional single, "Fish Scale", alongside the official music video, in anticipation of the then-upcoming mixtape. Exactly one week later, on January 12, 2022, he officially announced Colors and its release date. Alongside the announcement, he released the lead single, "Bring the Hook", alongside the official music video. The single "Flossin", a collaboration with American record label and record producer collective Internet Money, was released on January 21, 2022, the same day as the mixtape, and is included on its deluxe edition.

=== Other songs ===
Before the release of Colors, YoungBoy released a few songs from the mixtape with music videos to his YouTube channel, which were not officially released. The first visual was for "Emo Rockstar", which was released on December 22, 2021. He then released the music video for "Emo Love" on January 7, 2022. The visual for "Foolish Figure" was released two days later, on January 9, 2022. The final unofficial song with a music video was "Know Like I Know", which was released on January 18, 2022.

== Critical reception ==
Colors ratings
Review scores
Source	Rating
AllMusic	3/5 stars
Pitchfork	6.6/10
HipHopDX	3.5/5

Colors received generally positive reviews from critics. Writing for AllMusic, Paul Simpson felt that "the release allows YoungBoy to show off his range, from aggressive trap to more pop-leaning melodic tracks." Concluding his review, he notes "While staying true to YoungBoy's style, this is one of his more accessible releases." Paul A. Thompson from Pitchfork began his review by stating that "YoungBoy continues to push himself to vocal extremes—in addition to that familiar growl and effusive harmonizing." He notes that Colors is stitched together by "YoungBoy's willingness to lay bare the most tortured parts of his psyche." Concluding his review, he states "meaningfully synthesize (or even thoughtfully arrange) its disparate parts, a generous listener might find the volatility of YoungBoy's emotions from one song to the next an interesting thread on its own." Anthony Malone from HipHopDX notes that Colors "sees YoungBoy more conflicted than ever, saying one thing but acting the opposite." He continues to write that "Cuts such as “2Hoo,” “DC Marvel” and “Expensive Taste” are filled with shallow romanticism and descriptions of a sex life that's better suited on the down-low," and "On “Dis & That,” YoungBoy sounds like he's on autopilot and falling back on production that's stale and repetitive." He concludes his review by writing: "Colors suffer from an overabundance of songs that inflates the project, ruining what could be a more digestible project if the fat was trimmed."

== Commercial performance ==
Colors debuted at number two on the US Billboard 200 chart, earning 80,000 album-equivalent units (including under 2,000 in pure sales) in its first week, according to MRC Data. This became YoungBoy's eighth top-10 album on the chart. YoungBoy also became the fastest rapper in history to chart 20 albums on the Billboard 200, accomplishing this feat under four and a half years after first appearing on the chart. Colors has sold 500,000 album-equivalent units so far.

== Track listing ==
Colors track listing
No.	Title	Writer(s)	Producer(s)	Length
1.	"Long Live"	Kentrell Gaulden; Jason Goldberg; Aman Nikhanj; David Kim; Eelis Oikarinen; Leonardo Mateus; Davood Boushehri	Cheese; Saucey Beats; Luhkim; Ele Beatz; WassupBans; LVL35Dav	2:39
2.	"Bring It On"	Gaulden; Goldberg; Aaron Hill; Daniel Lebrun; Seth Love	Lastwordbeats; Droc; Berge; Skeeo	4:04
3.	"No Switch"	Gaulden; Goldberg; Brian Stewart; Giovanni Gardner	Cheese; BBoyBeatz; GorillaOnThaTrack; Tayo	3:00
4.	"Smoke One"	Gaulden; Goldberg; Nikhanj; Kim; Anthony Martinez; Benjamin Ibrahimovic	Cheese; Saucey Beats; Luhkim; Amart; Yo Benji	3:24
5.	"2Hoo"	Gaulden; Goldberg; Aaron Gilfenbain; Nicolas Schmidt; Jonathan Gabor	Cheese; BeatsAintFree JG; Nick Schmidt; Hurt	2:46
6.	"DC Marvel"	Gaulden; Joshua Parker; Bishop Grinnage; Goldberg	OG Parker; Beezo Beatz	2:56
7.	"How You Been"	Gaulden; Goldberg; Leor Shavah; Ethan Hicks; Daniel Valvano; Luca Steinkirchner	Cheese; Leor; HicksMadeThat; Dan; Lufye	2:04
8.	"Expensive Taste"	Gaulden; Goldberg; Lebrun	Droc; Cash	3:52
9.	"Cage Feeling"	Gaulden; Goldberg; Mateus; David Blom; Jordan Edon; Junior Sinchi	Cheese; WassupBans; Blom; Tfisdon; Jay LV	2:31
10.	"Dis & That"	Gaulden; Goldberg; Shavah; India Williams; Jack Thierer	Cheese; Leor; Indiagotthembeats; Yakree	2:55
11.	"Gangsta" (featuring Quando Rondo)	Gaulden; TyQuain Bowman; Goldberg; Jonathan Priester	Cheese; Supah Mario	4:16
12.	"Know Like I Know"	Gaulden; Goldberg; Stewart; Brandon Russell; Karionne Payton	Cheese; BBoyBeatz; Bj Beatz; Prod.KpBeats	3:52
13.	"Bring the Hook"	Gaulden; Goldberg; Hill; Lebrun; Lukas Payne; Sterling Reynolds; Mandell Strawter	Lastwordbeats; Droc; LondnBlue; Karltin Bankz; Lastworld	4:25
14.	"Fish Scale"	Gaulden; Goldberg; Mathias Liyew; Othello Houston	Cheese; Ambezza; Otxhello	2:50
15.	"Emo Rockstar"	Gaulden; Dwan Avery; Michael O'Brien; Kalop Carpenter; Goldberg	DY Krazy; 12Hunna (un); Exavis (un)	3:12
16.	"Emo Love"	Gaulden; Goldberg; Gilfenbain; Gabor; Clayton Priskorn	Cheese; BeatsAintFree JG; Hurt; FriendsOfClay	3:01
17.	"Snow Bunny"	Gaulden; Goldberg; Payne; Reynolds; Thomas Horton	Cheese; LondnBlue; Karltin Bankz; TNTXD	3:14
18.	"Foolish Figure"	Gaulden; Goldberg; Gilfenbain; Gabor; Hagan Lange; Luke Clay	Cheese; BeatsAintFree JG; Hurt; Hagan; LC	2:45
19.	"I Got This"	Gaulden; Goldberg; Lebrun; Dorien Theus; Anders Christiansen; Nicolai Andersen; Kasper Knudsen	Droc; DT; DopeTrademark (un); UpNorth (un)	6:05
Total length:				64:03

Deluxe bonus track
No.	Title	Writer(s)	Producer(s)	Length
20.	"Flossin'" (with Internet Money)	Gaulden; Danny Snodgrass, Jr.; Bryce Frizzell; Travis Nelson-Barker; Jabrielle Brooks; John Mbata; Donny Flores	Taz Taylor; BryceUnknwn; Y2tnb; JRHitmaker; Its2ezzy	2:48
Total length:				66:51

== Personnel ==
Credits adapted from Tidal.

- Jason "Cheese" Goldberg – mastering, mixing, recording (1–19), assistant recording (20)
- Mark Dorflinger – recording (20)
- Young Era – assistant recording (20)
- Luis Flores – assistant recording (20)
- Jeremie Inhaber – mastering, mixing (20)
- Frankie Salcido – mixing (20)

== Charts ==
=== Weekly charts ===
Chart performance for Colors
Chart (2022)	Peak position
Canadian Albums (Billboard)	21
US Billboard 200	2
US Top R&B/Hip-Hop Albums (Billboard)	1

=== Year-end charts ===
2022 year-end chart performance for Colors
Chart (2022)	Position
US Billboard 200	142
US Top R&B/Hip-Hop Albums (Billboard)	53

== Certifications ==
Certifications for Colors
Region	Certification	Certified units/sales
United States (RIAA)	Gold	500,000^{‡}
^{‡} Sales+streaming figures based on certification alone.
