= Overdose (YoungBoy Never Broke Again song) =

2018 song by YoungBoy Never Broke Again

Song by YoungBoy Never Broke Again

from the album Until Death Call My Name
- Released: April 27, 2018
- Genre: Gangsta rap; trap
- Length: 2:56
- Label: Never Broke Again; Artist Partner Group; Atlantic
- Songwriters: Kentrell Gaulden; Brenden Murray
- Producer: BigHead

Music video
- "Overdose" on YouTube

"Overdose" is a song by American rapper YoungBoy Never Broke Again, released on April 27, 2018, as the introduction of his debut studio album, Until Death Call My Name. In the upbeat Gangsta rap hit, YoungBoy raps about his come-up as an artist while also rapping about firearms, violence, and murder.

== Critical reception ==
HipHopDX's Justin Ivey noted that the track "works perfectly as an opening salvo, displaying his command and presence on a Bighead instrumental that pummels listeners over the head with thunderous bass."

== Music video ==
In the music video, which premiered the day of the song's release, YoungBoy is seen in New Orleans, Louisiana , taking influence from Birdman who appears in the video. The video is "complete with raw footage of Youngboy spending quality time with son and friends," however, it also pictures YoungBoy "two-stepping in the hallway of–what appears to be his home."

== Charts ==
Chart performance for "Overdose"
Chart (2018)	Peak position
US Billboard Hot 100	42
US Hot R&B/Hip-Hop Songs (Billboard)	22

== Certifications ==
Region	Certification	Certified units/sales
United States (RIAA)	Platinum	1,000,000^{‡}
^{‡} Sales+streaming figures based on certification alone.
