= More Leaks =

Compilation album by YoungBoy Never Broke Again
- Released: March 7, 2025
- Length: 61:36
- Label: Never Broke Again; Motown
- Producer: 2EZ; APGoKrazy; Ayo Bleu; Berge.af; BJondatrakk; Blom; Bnoise; Bnyx; BrandoBeatz; Census; Cheese; Decastro; Dissan; D-Roc; Ele Beatz; F1lthy; Harry Fraud; India Got Them Beats; JB Sauced Up; K10Beatz; K4ProducedIt; Kenoe; Killer; LastWordBeats; Leor Shevah; LL Beatz; London on da Track; MadzMadeTheBeat; Neeko Made This; PlayboyXO; Rellmadedat; Shop with Ken; Simo Fre; Sir Luke; Skeeo; Spaceman; TayTayMadeIt; WadeForTheWin; Zay Tekken

YoungBoy Never Broke Again chronology
I Just Got a Lot on My Shoulders (2024)	More Leaks (2025)	MASA (2025)

Singles from More Leaks
- 1. "5 Night" Released: February 28, 2025

Professional ratings
Review scores
Source	Rating
AllMusic	2.5/5 stars

More Leaks is the third compilation album by American rapper YoungBoy Never Broke Again, released through Never Broke Again and Motown on March 7, 2025. It features no guest appearances, while its production was handled by YoungBoy's go-to engineer and producer Cheese, supported by Bnyx, F1lthy, Harry Fraud, London on da Track, and several other producers. The project follows his seventh studio album, I Just Got a Lot on My Shoulders (2024), and is the final project released before he was released from prison on March 24, 2025, two weeks and three days after the compilation was released.

== Release and promotion ==
On February 27, 2025, the Never Broke Again Instagram page announced that the project would be the last before Gaulden's release from prison on July 27, 2025, while announcing the project's first single would be released on February 28. The project's lead single, "5 Night" was released on February 28.

== Track listing ==
More Leaks track listing
No.	Title	Writer(s)	Producer(s)	Length
1.	"Trapped Out"	Kentrell Gaulden; Tavian Carter; Jarrian Thompson; Eelis Oikarinen; David Blom	TayTayMadeIt; PlayboyXO; Ele Beatz; Blom	2:07
2.	"Rich Junkie"	Gaulden; Simone Di Franco; Ben Noyse; Nicolò Zangheri	Simo Fre; Bnoise; Killer	2:47
3.	"Jingle Bells"	Gaulden; Michael Roberge; Lazerick Seymour	Berge.af; Zay Tekken	2:54
4.	"5 Night"	Gaulden; London Holmes	London on da Track	3:12
5.	"Cut Throat"	Gaulden; Maurice Jordan; Seth Love; Kayshaun Mclean	Kenoe; K4; SKeeo	4:32
6.	"On Me"	Gaulden; Rory Quigley	Harry Fraud	3:15
7.	"86 Prayers"	Gaulden; Roberge; LaBrandon Robertson	Berge.af; BrandoBeatz	3:18
8.	"Trap 101"	Gaulden; Benjamin Saint-Fort	Bnyx	3:46
9.	"GD Galaxy"	Gaulden; Saint-Fort; Richard Ortiz; 2EZ	Bnyx; F1lthy; 2EZ	3:24
10.	"I Need a Doctor"	Gaulden; Roberge	Berge.af	2:33
11.	"Paparazzi"	Gaulden; Jordan; Mclean; Kenyon Cannon Jr.	Kenoe; K4; Rellmadedat	2:37
12.	"Of Late"	Gaulden; Kendale Carter; Jeremy Bradley	Shop with Ken; JB Sauced Up	3:16
13.	"Dump Truck"	Gaulden; Roberge; Aaron Hill	Berge.af; LastWordBeats	3:11
14.	"Letter to the North"	Gaulden; Daniel Lebrun; Bornot Lebrun; Julian Varlet; Audrey Ressjeac; Niko Schneider	D-Roc; Dissan; BJondatrakk; Neeko Made This	3:45
15.	"Demon Seed"	Gaulden; Carter	Shop With Ken	3:08
16.	"Hey Hey"	Gaulden; Mclean; Kyler Mathis; Leo Laitila	Skeeo; K10Beatz; LL Beatz	2:04
17.	"What You Want Do"	Gaulden; Jason Goldberg; Michael Romito; Leor Shevah; Campbell Rolston-Clemmer	Cheese; Census; Leor Shevah; Spaceman	2:53
18.	"Out My Mind"	Gaulden; Goldberg; Braylen Rembert; Gabriel Decastro; India Williams	Cheese; Ayo Bleu; Decastro; India Got Them Beats; WadeForTheWin	2:46
19.	"Take Me Slow"	Gaulden; Leburn; Archie Patmore; Luke Davies	D-Roc; APGoKrazy; Sir Luke; MadzMadeTheBeat	3:27
20.	"She a Demon"	Gaulden; Di Franco; Leburn	Simo Fre; D-Roc	2:34
Total length:				61:36

Sample credits

- "Out My Mind" contains samples of "Bottom of the Map", written by Jay Jenkins and Demetrius Stewart, as performed by Jeezy.

== Charts ==
Chart performance for More Leaks
Chart (2025)	Peak position
US Billboard 200	29
US Top R&B/Hip-Hop Albums (Billboard)	12

== See also ==
- 2025 in hip hop music
