= Solar Eclipse (YoungBoy Never Broke Again song) =

Song by YoungBoy Never Broke Again

from the album Until Death Call My Name
- Released: April 27, 2018
- Recorded: 2017
- Length: 3:47
- Label: Never Broke Again; Atlantic
- Songwriters: Kentrell Gaulden; Aaron Lockhart, Jr.; Joseph Steele; Treallion Escobar; Brandon Bostic
- Producers: Dubba-AA; 1040

Music video
- "Solar Eclipse" on YouTube

"Solar Eclipse" is a song by American rapper YoungBoy Never Broke Again from his debut studio album Until Death Call My Name (2018). It was produced by Dubba-AA and 1040. The song's music video was previously released in December 2017.

== Composition ==
The song finds NBA YoungBoy crooning, while reflecting on the condition of his career.

== Music video ==
A music video for the song was released on December 14, 2017. It opens with NBA YoungBoy spending time with his children, as he sings to them, followed by footage of him performing onstage.

== Charts ==
Chart (2018)	Peak position
US Bubbling Under Hot 100 (Billboard)	6
US Hot R&B/Hip-Hop Songs (Billboard)	46

== Certifications ==
Region	Certification	Certified units/sales
United States (RIAA)	2× Platinum	2,000,000^{‡}
^{‡} Sales+streaming figures based on certification alone.
