= Testimony (YoungBoy Never Broke Again song) =

2023 single by YoungBoy Never Broke Again

Single by YoungBoy Never Broke Again
- Released: September 29, 2023
- Length: 2:57
- Label: Never Broke Again; Motown
- Songwriters: Kentrell Gaulden; Shelton Scales Jr.
- Producer: Jay Scalez

YoungBoy Never Broke Again singles chronology
"No Fake Love" (2023)	"Testimony" (2023)	"Heard of Me" (2023)

Music video
- "Testimony" on YouTube

"Testimony" is a song by American rapper YoungBoy Never Broke Again, first released on September 25, 2023, as a music video before being released to streaming services on September 29, 2023. It was produced by Jay Scalez.

== Content ==
The song finds YoungBoy Never Broke Again harmonizing about his past mistakes and street life.

== Music video ==
The music video was directed by Karltin Bankz and filmed in Utah, where YoungBoy has been residing since he was placed on house arrest. It sees him horseback riding near the mountainside and showing off cash with his crew.

== Charts ==
Chart performance for "Testimony"
Chart (2023)	Peak position
US Bubbling Under Hot 100 (Billboard)	13
