= NBAYoungBoat =

2018 song by Lil Yachty

Song by Lil Yachty featuring YoungBoy Never Broke Again

from the album Lil Boat 2
- Released: March 9, 2018
- Length: 2:20
- Label: Capitol; Motown; Quality Control
- Songwriters: Miles McCollum; Kentrell Gaulden; Nasir Pemberton
- Producer: Digital Nas

"NBAYoungBoat" (stylized in all caps) is a song by American rapper Lil Yachty featuring fellow American rapper YoungBoy Never Broke Again. It was released as the eleventh track of Yachty's second studio album Lil Boat 2. The track peaked at sixty-three on the Billboard Hot 100.

== Composition ==
Writing for Spectrum Culture, Daniel Bromfield wrote that the track is "delivered in an eighth-note".

== Reception ==
The track received mediocre reviews from critics, however, it received positive reviews from fans and listeners. Metacritic stated that the song is a top track on Lil Boat 2. Steve "Flash" Juon for Rap Reviews noted that the track is exceptional due to YoungBoy's "charisma and better delivery". Kayla Lumpkins for The Northerner noted that Yachty "raps really fast and off-beat, which is prevalent [to the track]".

== Charts ==
Chart (2018)	Peak position
US Billboard Hot 100	63
US Hot R&B/Hip-Hop Songs (Billboard)	31

== Certifications ==
Region	Certification	Certified units/sales
United States (RIAA)	Platinum	1,000,000^{‡}
^{‡} Sales+streaming figures based on certification alone.
