= Ain't Too Long =

Mixtape by YoungBoy Never Broke Again
- Released: October 7, 2017
- Length: 24:32
- Label: Never Broke Again; APG; Atlantic
- Producer: Dubba-AA; Louie Bandz; Mike Laury

YoungBoy Never Broke Again chronology
AI YoungBoy (2017)	Ain't Too Long (2017)	Master the Day of Judgement (2017)

Ain't Too Long is the eighth solo mixtape by American rapper YoungBoy Never Broke Again. It was released on October 7, 2017, by Never Broke Again, Artist Partner Group, and Atlantic Records, serving as his second commercial release with Atlantic. The mixtape features production from Dubba-AA, DJ Swift, and Gitt Fai, among others. The mixtape peaked at number 173 on the US Billboard 200, making YoungBoy's second entry on the chart.

== Background ==
Despite not having any officially released singles, "Confidential" was released exclusively on YouTube on September 20, 2017, prior to being distributed to all digital streaming platforms alongside the mixtape.

On October 4, 2017, YoungBoy took to his official Instagram to announce the release of the mixtape, captioning the post: "Ain’t too long' drop Saturday #8songs."

== Critical reception ==
Professional ratings
Review scores
Source	Rating
Pitchfork	7.4/10

Ain't Too Long received positive reviews from music critics. Writing for Pitchfork, James Balfour noted that the mixtape "continues to upend the fear and survivalism that [YoungBoy] carries with him" while noting that he "runs hot with revenge and remains obsessed with safeguarding his family at home and in the streets." Balfour stated that "YoungBoy’s raps run the gamut from fast-paced and percussive shouts to an almost metallic croon when the rasp of his voice is touched by AutoTune" while noting that his "nostalgia rots into resentment" throughout the project. Balfour concluded his review by stating that "even at this pivotal, accelerated moment in his career, it makes sense he’d want time to stand still for a little while."

== Track listing ==
Ain't Too Long track listing
No.	Title	Writer(s)	Producer(s)	Length
1.	"Confidential"	Kentrell Gaulden; Aaron Lockhart Jr.	Dubba-AA	3:27
2.	"Coordination"	Gaulden; Lockhart Jr.; Dennis Neal Jr.	Dubba-AA; Louie Bandz	3:02
3.	"Thug Alibi"	Gaulden; Lockhart Jr.; Neal Jr.	Dubba-AA; Louie Bandz	3:12
4.	"Red Rum"	Gaulden; Lockhart Jr.	Dubba-AA	3:53
5.	"Better Man"	Gaulden; Lockhart Jr.; Neal Jr.	Dubba-AA; Louie Bandz	3:55
6.	"War with Us"	Gaulden; Lockhart Jr.; Michael Laury	Dubba-AA; Mike Laury	3:17
7.	"You the One"	Gaulden; Lockhart Jr.; Neal Jr.	Dubba-AA; Louie Bandz	3:07
Total length:				24:32

== Personnel ==
Credits adapted from Tidal.

- Marcus Richard – mixing (2–6)
- Marcus Richard – recording (2, 4, 6)

== Charts ==
Weekly chart performance for Ain't Too Long
Chart (2017)	Peak position
US Billboard 200	173
