= Bring the Hook =

2022 single by YoungBoy Never Broke Again

Single by YoungBoy Never Broke Again

from the album Colors
- Released: January 12, 2022
- Genre: Gangsta rap; trap
- Length: 4:25
- Label: Never Broke Again; Atlantic
- Songwriters: Kentrell Gaulden; Jason Goldberg; Aaron Hill; Daniel Lebrun; Lukas Payne; Sterling Reynolds; Mandell Strawter
- Producers: Cheese; Lastwordbeats; D-Roc; LondnBlue; Karltin Bankz; Lastworld

YoungBoy Never Broke Again singles chronology
"Hit" (2022)	"Bring the Hook" (2022)	"Flossin'" (2022)

"Bring the Hook" is a song by American rapper YoungBoy Never Broke Again, released on January 12, 2022 as the lead single from his mixtape Colors (2022). It was produced by Cheese, Karltin Bankz, Lastwordbeats, LondnBlue and D-Roc. The song received controversy for a diss toward the late rapper King Von.

== Controversy ==
The song is notable for YoungBoy taking shots at the rappers from O'Block in Chicago, especially King Von, whose 2020 murder is referenced: "Nigga, this that Squid Game, O-Block pack get rolled up / Murder what they told us, Atlanta boy get fold up".

After the song circulated on social media, rapper Lil Durk posted a picture of him sitting alongside a poster of King Von on Instagram, along with the caption "Don't claim it if you ain't do it you still a bitch." Rapper Lil Reese commented on the track that YoungBoy was "just rapping like the rest of these rappers all rap". Rapper NLE Choppa replied in agreement. A week later, YoungBoy responded with a diss track aiming at Choppa, "Know Like I Know".

== Charts ==
Chart (2022)	Peak position
Global 200 (Billboard)	192
US Billboard Hot 100	61
US Hot R&B/Hip-Hop Songs (Billboard)	19
