= Fuck Niggaz =

2024 single by YoungBoy Never Broke Again

Single by YoungBoy Never Broke Again
- Released: February 7, 2024
- Length: 2:13
- Label: Never Broke Again; Motown
- Songwriters: Kentrell Gaulden; Michael Roberge
- Producer: Berge.af

YoungBoy Never Broke Again singles chronology
"we shot him in his head huh" (2024)	"Fuck Niggaz" (2024)	"Down 4 You" (2024)

"Fuck Niggaz" is a single by American rapper YoungBoy Never Broke Again, released on February 6, 2024 and produced by Berge.af. The lyrics to the song have been described as violent.

== Charts ==
Chart performance for "Fuck Niggaz"
Chart (2024)	Peak position
US Bubbling Under Hot 100 (Billboard)	1
US Hot R&B/Hip-Hop Songs (Billboard)	48
