= Fish Scale (song) =

Promotional single by YoungBoy Never Broke Again

from the album Colors
- Released: January 5, 2022
- Length: 2:50
- Label: Never Broke Again; Atlantic
- Songwriters: Kentrell Gaulden; Jason Goldberg; Othello Houston; Mathias Liyew
- Producers: Cheese; Otxhello; Ambezza

Music video
- "Fish Scale" on YouTube

"Fish Scale" is a song by American rapper YoungBoy Never Broke Again, released on January 5, 2022 as a promotional single from his mixtape Colors (2022). It was produced by Jason "Cheese" Goldberg, Otxhello and Ambezza.

== Composition ==
Jon Powell of Revolt wrote that the song sees YoungBoy "keeping it very street-oriented on wax". Both the production and lyrics of the song have been described as "sinister"; music critics noted the lyrics, "Spotted him, I sent a pic to that nigga to show him I'm only lettin' him breathe / Shot at him, I swung that stick at that nigga / The bullets, they stronger than Hercules".

== Charts ==
Chart (2022)	Peak position
US Billboard Hot 100	68
US Hot R&B/Hip-Hop Songs (Billboard)	23
