= DreDDup discography =

dreDDup discography
- Studio albums: 11
- Extended plays: 11
- Soundtrack albums: 10
- Live albums: 2
- Compilation albums: 19
- Singles: 27
- Video albums: 1
- Music videos: 69

The discography of the Serbian industrial rock band dreDDup comprises seven studio albums, one live albums, one video album, and twenty music videos.

The band released their debut album, Mr Borndeads Feast in 2004, after the release of the compact cassette Abnormal Waltz, recorded in 1998. With the release of the band's second studio album, Future Porn Machine, the band abolished the early mainstream concept, and turned towards industrial rock music. However, it was on the follow-up, El Conquistadors, that the band found their own musical style and expression, an artistically oriented industrial rock, captured live on the Live in 219, also found on the third studio album El Conquistadors, released in 2009. In 2009, the band released the Industrial Renaissance DVD featuring the live recording of the 2007 Belgrade performance, and all the music videos the band had made throughout their career. Their fourth release was self-titled dreDDup (album) released for dPulse in 2011. Soon after that one, band announced the last album to be 'Nautilus'. After it was released in 2012, the band soon went silent on studio work. Surprisingly in 2014, they presented 'I Dreamt of a Dragon', their sixth studio album which contained more commercial sound. In early 2016. band came back with another release - their seventh studio album 'DeathOven (Rebels Have no Kings)'. They are currently working on their next record.

== Studio albums ==
Year	Album details
1998	Abnormal Waltz: Released: 1998; Label: DIY; Format: Cassette
2004	Mr Borndeads Feast: Released: 2005; Label: MoocSound; Format: CD
2007	Future Porn Machine: Released: 2007; Label: Insurrection Records / Dark Revolution; Format: CD
2008	El Conquistadors: Released: 2009; Label: Insurrection Records / Dark Revolution; Re-Released: 2010; Label: Beast of Prey Records; Format: CD
2011	dreDDup: Released: 2011; Label: dPulse Recordings | SKCns; Format: CD
2012	Nautilus: Released: 2012; Label: Miner Recordings; Format: CD
2014	I Dreamt of a Dragon: Released: 2014; Label: Lampshade Media; Format: Digital download
2015	DeathOven (Rebels Have No Kings): Released: 2016; Label: Lampshade Media; Format: Digital download, Audio cassette
2018	Soyuz: Released: 2018; Label: dreDDup; Format: Digital download, Audio cassette
2021	Romance of Romans: Released: 2021; Label: dreDDup; Format: Digital download, Audio cassette
2024	Pan/Dora: Released: 2024; Label: dreDDup; Format: Digital download, CD, Audio cassette

== Cassettes/OtherMedia ==
Year	Demo details
1997	The Hot Stuff: Demo cassette; Label: DIY; Format: CS
1998	Total Noise: Demo EP; Re-Released: 2013; Label: Crime:Scene Records; Format: CS
1998	Abnormal Waltz: Demo; Re-Released: 2007; Label: Amduscias records / Neurotic Mind / Internal Cranium Bleeding / DeadKnife / Dadaist Audio / Far From Showbiz / Coreback Records; Format: CS, CD
1998	Digital Punk Years (When We Were Teens): EP; Label: DIY; Format: CS
1999	Roots of Us (Rave Years): EP; Label: DIY; Format: CS
1999	Two One Nine 1997-1999: Demo cassette; Label: DIY; Format: CS
1999	Zog Tag: Demo album; Label: DIY; Format: CS
2001	Problematic Memories: EP; Label: DIY; Format: CS
2001	Transfusion 219: EP; Label: DIY; Format: CS
2001	R U Digital: Demo album; Label: DIY; Format: CS
2002	219 Demos: Demo collection; Label: Dark:Scene Records; Format: CD
2003	Mirror Mirror: Spoken word; Label: DIY; Format: Digital download
2016	DisTurBiA: EP; Label: DIY; Format: Digital download
2016	doTM: EP; Label: DIY; Format: Digital download
2019	(219) cassette: Demo compilation; Label: DIY; Format: Digital download
2024	Raw Sound Revolt: Floppy disc; Label: DIY; Format: Floppy Disc release

== Live albums ==
Year	Album details
2008	Live in 219: Released: 2009; Label: Insurrection Records; Format: DVD
2011	Alive From the Other Side: Live Album; Label: Dark:Scene Records; Format: CD

== Singles ==
=== Various artists compilation appearances ===
Year	Single details
2013	"Non-negotiable": From the compilation: Shadow Places Different Echoes; Released: 2013; Label: Dark Planet records; Format: CD
2009	"With No Teeth": From the compilation: Not Our World Alone; Released: 2009; Label: Pavillon 36 Recording; Format: CD
2009	"Return of the TV": From the compilation: Dark Scene from Balkan; Released: 2009; Label: Notariqon records; Format: CD
2008	"Halloween": From the compilation: The World of All Evil Dead; Released: 2008; Label: DeadKnife records; Format: CD
2008	"Inside Out" / "Not From Here": From the compilation: Postindustrial changes; Released: 2008; Label: Downtown Recordings; Format: CD
2007	"Inside Out" / "Not From Here": From the compilation: Go Fest:S'pogledom u bolje sutra; Released: 2007; Label: Kulturno-Prosvetna Zajednica Odzaci; Format: CD
2005	"Generation Devastation" / "If There Is" / "Off the Hook" / "Evil Chicks": From the compilation: One Way; Released: 2005; Label: Badroom Tapes - SKC NS; Format: CD

=== Collaboration albums ===
Year	Single details
2013	"Remixes & Covers": From the compilation: Remixes & Covers; Released: 2013; Label: Bandcamp; Format: CD
2008	"Collaboration with Figurative Theatre": From the album: The Great Industrial Comeback; Released: 2008; Label: Dark:Scene Records; Format: CD
2007	"Collaboration with Kenji Siratori": From the album: Pituitary Nightmare; Released: 2007; Label: SDF Records; Format: CD

=== Tribute album appearances ===
Year	Single details
2023	"Distorted Fields": From the tribute album: Planete Magnifiee - A Tribute to Failure; Released: 2023; Label: Chabane's Records; Format: CD
2013	"Day Of The Tentacle Opening Theme": From the tribute album: Press Start Button; Released: 2013; Label: Chabane's Records; Format: CD
2009	"Debilana": From the tribute album: Blago gluvima: a Tribute to Patareni; Released: 2009; Label: PMK Records; Format: CD
2009	"1969": From the tribute album: Our Idea of Fun (A Tribute to Ron Asheton); Released: 2009; Label: Chabane's records; Format: CD
2009	"Hajde da se volimo": From the tribute album:: Dark Tribute to Lepa Brena; Released: 2009; Label: Dark:Scene Records; Format: mp3
2008	"No Holds Barred": From the tribute album:: We Were Born to Deastroy: A Tribute to Witness; Released: 2008; Label: Chabane's Records; Format: CD
2008	"Dolje u Tisini": From the tribute album:: Tribute to Razlog Za; Released: 2008; Label: PMK Records; Format: CD
2008	"Piggy": From the tribute album:: Nine Inch Nails: Underneath it All; Released: 2008; Label: DeadKnife Records; Format: CD

== Soundtracks ==
Year	Album details
2002	Samuraj bez duše: Released: 2002; Label: AUNS; Format: DVD
2004	Alisa u zemlji čuda: Released: 2004; Label: AUNS; Format: DVD
2010	Araneum: Released: 2010; Label: OM Films; Format: DVD
2015	Radar - Auschwitz Jugoslovensko Sećanje: Released: 2015; Label: RTVNS; Format: DVD
2016	Enkel: Released: 2016; Label: RTVNS; Format: DVD
2022	Do daske: Released: 2022; Label: CoreDoxFilms; Format: DVD
2023	Mamula All Inclusive: Released: 2023; Label: CoreDoxFilms; Format: DVD
2024	Novi Sad Remembrance: Released: 2024; Label: CoreDoxFilms; Format: DVD

== Video albums ==
Year	Album details
2009	Industrial Renaissance DVD: Released: 2009; Label: Insurrection / Dark Revolution; Format: DVD

== Music videos ==
Song
1997	"Step In, Step Out"
1997	"Generation Devastation"
1998	"Found Myself In Veins of a Virgin"
1998	"Help"
1998	"No Hands Man"
1998	"Rusty Nails"
1999	"CD Burner"
2000	"Mocky Llock"
2001	"Power Up the Horse"
2001	"Sweet sixteen"
2002	"Problematic Memories"
2002	"Paper Cutz"
2002	"3010"
2002	"Got 2 Got 2 Get"
2002	"FIN"
2003	"3010 (ver.2)"
2004	"Your World"
2005	"Mr Borndead"
2006	"Plastica"
2006	"Redeemer"
2006	"Haeekoo"
2007	"When You Know That It's All Wrong"
2007	"Inside Out"
2008	"No More Fingers"
2008	"Return of the TV"
2009	"Oregon"
2009	"Last One"
2009	"Invisible Tears"
2010	"Orbit"
2010	"God of FM Stereo"
2010	"Stop Rew Play"
2011	"Footfalls"
2011	"When Dead Come Home"
2011	"Machine"
2011	"People Are Dead"
2011	"Garden of Dead Friends"
2012	"Cold Eyes"
2013	"Two of Us"
2013	"Fire Up the Planet"
2014	"TamTamTam"
2014	"Pussy Control Panel"
2015	"Marquis de Novi Sad"
2016	"Disco-Taken"
2016	"Rage Disease Desire"
2017	"Venom"
2017	"Zelia"
2017	"Disco-Taken"
2018	"ReMorse Code"
2018	"The Last Dance"
2018	"Ctrl Alt Death"
2019	"Designed to Die"
2020	"Dark Street Boys"
2020	"Wounded By Sound"
2021	"The Rolling Sotones"
2021	"All Wives Matter"
2021	"Sgt.Salt"
2021	"Romance of Romans"
2022	"Etika"
2022	"We Sperm Noise"
2022	"Zero Tolerance"
2022	"Mr. Fooz"
2022	"Lust Supper"
2022	"Margot's Not Dead Yet"
2022	"Futurism"
2022	"Roots of Them"
2023	"Plastica"
2023	"Clark Can't"
2023	"Cherry Noble"
2024	"Not From Here"
2024	"Angel for the Masses"

|}
