= DreDDup =

Serbian band

dreDDup
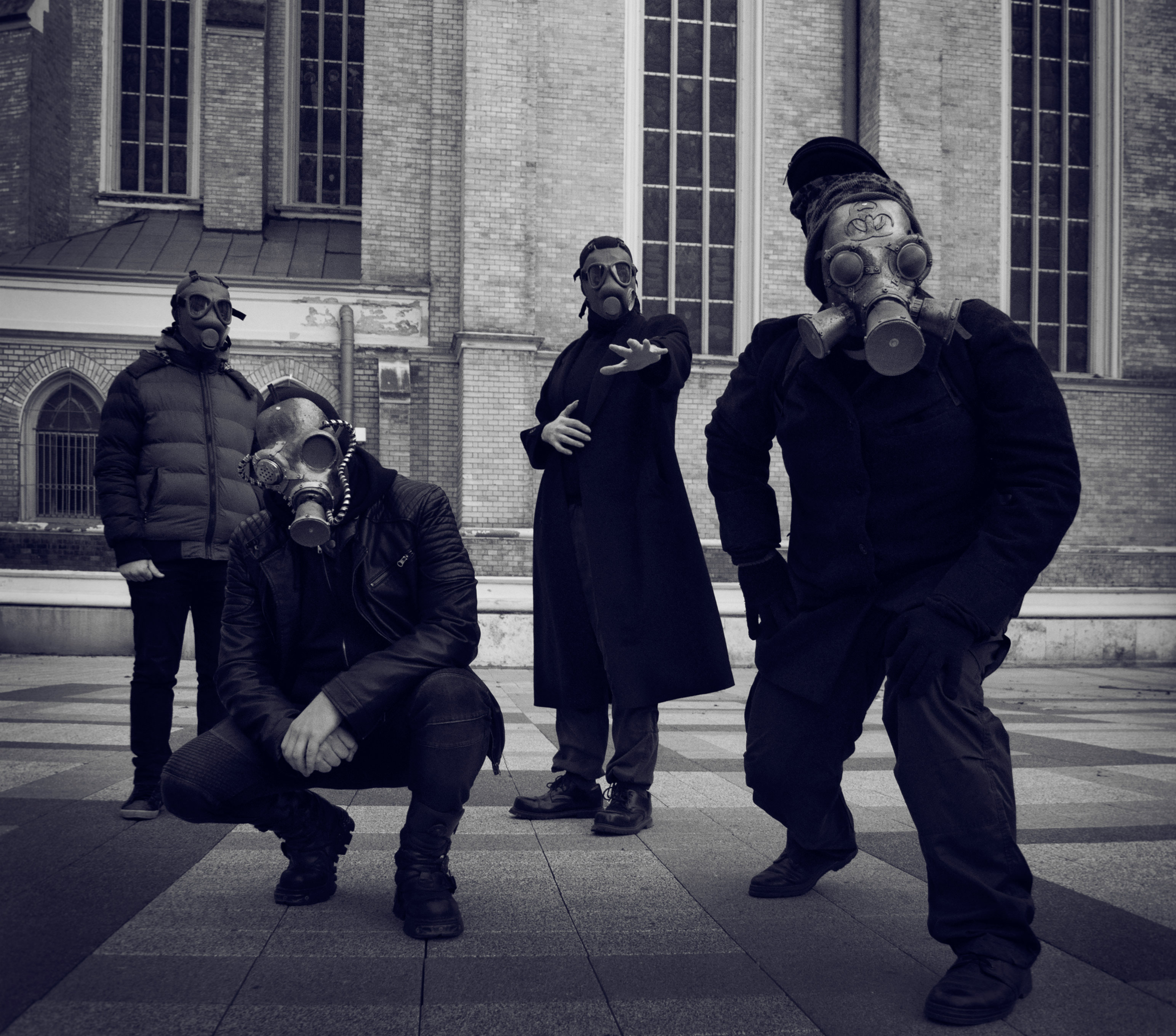
- dreDDup in 2017

Background information
- Origin: Novi Sad, Serbia
- Genres: Big beat, electronica, industrial rock, post-industrial
- Years active: 1997–present
- Labels: Lampshade Media, Miner Recordings, Labtoy Music, dPulse Recordings, Glory & Honour, SKCns, Beast of Prey, Insurrection
- Members: miKKa; Norburt Reynolds; Xenobeat; Zsolt
- Past members: Borivoje Janačković; Dražen Đorđević; Alen Habek; Timur Iskandarov; Aleksandar Savić; Mario Matak; Aleksandra Vukošić; Badža; Predrag Drobnjak; Ivan Francuski; Danica Bićanić; Nemanja Batalo; Bojan Radaković; Darko Ižak; Srđan Stevanović; Aleksandar Krajovan; Karolina Nemet; Dragan Mršić; Nikola Prošić; Siniša Radovančev; Robert Sabadoš
- Website: dreDDup website

dreDDup is a Serbian industrial rock and electronic band.

== History ==
=== 1990s ===
The band was formed in 1997 in Novi Sad by guitarist/vocalist Mihajlo Obrenov and drummer/vocalist Robert Sabadoš. Soon after, they recorded their first official release Abnormal Waltz from 1998, the soundtrack for the movie Noir that was never finished. Without much musical experience, dreDDup members started experimenting with live instruments combining them with loud electronic synthesizers. At first, they made rave, techno, electronic punk and experimental music while performing live only at their rehearsal space for friends and other musicians. Their '90s era includes Beyond the Dark Portal demo cassette, 'Abnormal Waltz' DIY release and several cassette EPs. Their first songs were aired on radio shows 'Situacija 021' hosted by Vladimir Petraš and 'High Voltage' hosted by Dunja Kovač at 'Radio 021' in Novi Sad. Their song 'Roots of Us' remained at the first place on 'Situacija 021' music chart for several weeks. dreDDup started performing live at the end of the '90s in small venues in Novi Sad.

=== 2000s ===
In the year 2000, after one live concert at Borisov Atelje underground club, Robert left the band and Mihajlo became the new vocalist for the band. The band continued with a new line-up, changing from electronic experimental to more rock-oriented sound. Drummer Siniša Radovančev from Lost Propelleros joined the band for a while. The new stable line-up included Aleksandar Krajovan from Lowspin on bass and Nikola Prošić on drums. Following this, the band wrote music for movies and theater plays (including Poslednja Krapova Traka, Footfalls, U malom dvorcu, Hronika Sterijinog pozorja) and recorded ambient tracks for TV shows at the Radio Television of Serbia. In 2001. the band entered studio 'Do Re Mi' with the band Mefisto to record a split demo CD, followed by two separated DIY releases of both bands: Bili smo ponosni ratnici album of Mefisto and R U Digital!? demo album of dreDDup. In 2002. Karolina Nemet joined the band as a keyboard player, followed by MC Sanya on backing vocals. Nikola Prošić left the band in 2003 and was replaced by session drummer Dragan Mršić from the band Cutwork.

In 2004 the band finally released its first official studio album Mr Borndeads Feast for MoocSound records from the Netherlands. The album release was followed by a massive tour around Serbia. Line-up included two new members, Darko Ižak on guitar and Srđan Stevanović on drums. The band started performing frequently at various venues in Novi Sad, Subotica, Kula, Zrenjanin, Beograd, Senta and other Serbian towns. After Mr Borndeads Feast and positive reviews from the press, the band started working on their second album, changing the sound again and making it more crossover oriented. In a collaboration with the bands Roir, Maltreat and Under Pressure the band released 'One Way' in 2005, a CD compilation which included several tracks from all 4 bands and a comic book drawn by Mihajlo Obrenov. Aleksandar Krajovan left the band in late 2006, and was replaced by Nemanja Batalo on bass guitar.

In 2007. the band released their second album Future Porn Machinefor Insurrection Records from Belgrade. This album dealt with the "pornographic future" and was heavily promoted by Dark Revolution collective. Later that year, they've been included in 'S pogledom u Bolje sutra' compilation which also featured bands This Day Will Burn, Lude Krawe, Ground Zero, Infrakt and more. Another tour took place and the band visited more than 40 cities. Srđan Stevanović was arrested on the charge of murder and possession of heavy drugs, so the mid-2008 marked a complete change of the band's line-up. The new line-up included Bojan Radaković on guitar and Ivan Francuski on drums, leaving Mihajlo the only original member in the band. The band remixed some of Nine Inch Nails songs and did a collaboration album Pituitary Nightmare with Japanese spoken word artist Kenji Siratori and also collaboration album 'The Great Industrial Comeback' with electronic music project Figurative Theatre.

dreDDup played at numerous music festivals from 2006 to 2009, including the EXIT Festival, String, Refuse Resist, Samhain festival, Go Fest, HGF, SGT, Determination and D:S. In early 2008. the band recorded 'No Holds Barred' a cover song for the compilation 'We Were Born to Destroy' compiled by Chabane's Records from France as a tribute to the French band Witness. The year 2008 also marked a lot of foreign compilation inclusions for the band. They've recorded a cover of cult hardcore band Razlog za, which was featured on a 'Tribute to Razlog za' compilation released by 'PMK Records'. The following compilations were 'Postindustrial Changes', Slovenian compilation of "new Yugoslav industrial" scene, along with the bands like Third I, Dichotomy Engine, Lezet and 'Devouring Ourselves (a Tribute to Cannibal Corpse)' compilation by French record label Chabane's Records which included acts like Zardonic, Deadskin, Deviant Lord and more.

In late 2008, Mihajlo started his own online record label called Crime:Scene Records. At the end of the year 2008, the band filmed a 45-minute documentary called Industrial Renaissance. It contained a lot of interviews, complete music video collection and some rare, previously unreleased live video footage. Their cover of cult grind core band Patareni was also included on 'Blago gluvima: A Tribute to Patareni' compilation, compiled by PMK Records. The movie Industrial Renaissance was released in February 2009, as a bonus DVD for their third album El Conquistadors. Industrial Renaissance aired on Television Panonija in March 2009.

Their third album, El Conquistadors, was released for Insurrection Records from Belgrade in late 2009. The album dealt with dark current times and the darkness of mankind, completing the Time trilogy of dreDDup releases and changing band's sound to a much more industrial approach. In July, they performed along with Deathstars at Exit Festival. Their album El Conquistadors was pronounced the second best Balkan album of the year 2009 by the Croatian magazine Terapija and also got a third place in Macedonian Okno magazine article about the best Balkan acts of 2009. Later the same year the band played its first concert abroad in Vienna. At the end of 2009, Quartier23 record label released Dark: Scene from Balkans compilation which, beside dreDDup, also included acts like Tamerlan, Utjeha kose and Figurative Theatre. Also, dreDDup did a cover of "1969" song, which was included in "Our Idea of Fun-A Tribute to Ron Asheton" compilation released in honor of Ron Asheton who died the same year. This compilation was published by Chabane's Records, and among others, included bands like Riverside, Jihad Joe and The Naked Dolls.

=== 2010s ===
February 2010 brought remasters of their first three albums. Their album El Conquistadors was remastered and rereleased on the Beast of Prey record label from Poland. Bojan Radaković and Nemanja Batalo left the band, and were replaced by Alen Habek on guitar and Aleksandra Vukošić on bass. Their fourth album titled dreDDup (album) was released for dPulse Recordings in the US. This was also announced by Mihajlo to be the last dreDDup studio album; nevertheless, dreDDup started working on their new release. Album included guest musicians from bands f.O.F., Talbot's Curse, Kleimor and KOH. Artwork for the album was created by the artist Bojana Jarošenko. Their promotional tour included countries Croatia, Slovenia and Bulgaria. dreDDup was included on a massive compilation titled Not Our World Alone compiled by Pavillon 36 records. Compilation profit financed several organizations for the prevention of animal abuse and the help to endangered animal species. The same year, dreDDup did remix of "Enjoy the Pain" song for American industrial rock band 16 Volt. At the end of the year, a collection of their demo recordings called 219_demos was released by Crime Scene records. This collection presented unreleased material recorded between 1997 and 2001.

Their fifth album, titled Nautilus came out in 2011, for Glory and Honour. It was re-released for Miner Records in 2012, followed by massive tour which included France, Switzerland, Germany, Slovenia, Croatia and Bosnia. The album featured a song 'Train to Madness' sang by Gage Lee from the band Hype! and a movie actress Ljuma Penov who sang backing vocals for several songs. On June 9, 2012, they performed at IQ Music festival as an opening act for Slovenian industrial group Laibach and Marilyn Manson. On September 15, 2012, dreDDup performed on Warriors Dance Festival, organized The Prodigy and Exit Festival opening for English punk band Toy Dolls. In early 2013, they began another European tour and appeared on another tribute compilation titled Requiem Pour les Medef: tribute to Medef Ibba Babylone compiled by Chabane's Recors.

In July 2013, dreDDup released "Etika", a single featuring Dario Seraval of cult Croatian/Slovenian industrial band Borghesia on vocals. Following that, they were featured on a compilation titled Press Start Button which contains covers of video game music themes. dreDDup contributed by covering the main theme from the video game Day of the Tentacle by Lucas Arts. In the same year, they were included in 'Shadow Places Different Echoes', a compilation of industrial bands compiled by Dark Places collective. Soon after, Ivan Francuski left the band and was replaced by Predrag Drobnjak from Vrisak Generacije. In summer of 2013, the band played at Kaleidoskop Festival in Bosnia and Kunigunda Festival in Slovenia. Band was included in a rock music encyclopaedia Ilustrovana enciklopedija rok muzike u Vojvodini 1963-2013 written by Bogomir Mijatović in late 2013. This book featured artists that came from the Vojvodina province of Serbia.

Their sixth album, I Dreamt of a Dragon, was finished on October 30, 2014, and was released by Lampshade Media. In early 2015. dreDDup composed music for several TV documentaries, including RTV series Radar and an award-winning documentary by Aleksandar Reljić entitled Enkel which talks about Auschwitz concentration camp survivors. Soon after, Aleksandra Vukošić left the band. The band changed its line-up rapidly during the 2014–2016 period, and several members came and went through, until Borivoje Janacković from Thread joined the band on drums.

In early 2016, the band released their seventh album, titled DeathOven: Rebels Have no Kings. Their style changed and dreDDup incorporated more big beat and dance electronics elements into their music. 'DeathOven' features two guest vocalists: Lucretia Wamp from horror punk band Drop Dead and Marta Csoór from Vrisak Generacije. Siniša Radovančev also contributed by playing backing drum loops on several tracks. He died on April 14, just ten days before the album came out. Timur Iskandarov from Tamerlan joined the band on bass guitar. In July, Mihajlo Obrenov finished work on his documentary movie Kontakt about underground music scene in Novi Sad. The film includes original music composed by dreDDup and rare interviews with 140 underground musicians, including dreDDup members. The movie was later screened at Cinema City Film Festival, Grossman Film Festival, DokumFest Bosnia, Filmski Festival Euro-In Film, Rokumentarni dani Nikšić and other European festivals.

Their eight album Soyuz came out on November 27, 2018. Album was praised by a music critic Vladimir Horvat from Croatian magazine Terapija.net as one of their best works so far. The band began its promotional tour in early 2019 with a concert in Budapest, Hungary. They have announced their new album 'Romance of Romans' with a music video for the "Designed to Die" single on their YouTube channel. In March 2019, Dražen Đorđević from Lednik replaced Timur on bass guitar.

=== 2020s ===
In February 2020, the band entered the studio to record their planned new album 'Romance of Romans', which was postponed to January 5, 2021 due to Corona pandemic. The band worked on music for Aleksandar Reljić's documentary film 'Do daske', which is about the arrest and imprisonment of a fashion designer, stylist, and DJ from Novi Sad, Srđan Šveljo. In 2021, dreDDup had a notable performance at the Fekete Zaj festival in Hungary as part of their promotional tour, where they visited Hungary, Slovakia, and southern Serbia several times. To celebrate their 25th anniversary, in 2022, the band recorded 10 completely new music videos for old singles and thus entered the history as the only Serbian alternative band with 68 music videos. At the beginning of 2023, they entered the studio and started working on their eleventh album 'PanDora'."

== Musical style ==
The music of dreDDup is a mixture of dark noisy electronic sounds with rough industrial rhythms and metallic vocals. They are mostly influenced by the post-industrial music scene of the late 1980s and the mid-1990s. They have changed their sound since 1997 but were always somewhere between the electro-industrial/post-industrial boundaries. After experimenting with weird noises and rough drum beats they have been striving to create a unique musical world in which rock, big beat, industrial, punk and loud electronics are equally present and blend in closely with a disturbed visual world. They call it ‘massacre industrial’ or ‘demonic electronic’. As their influences they list Bile, The Prodigy, Kim Wilde and Skinny Puppy.

== Cassette releases ==
- The Hot Stuff (1997 demo tape)
- Digital Punk Years (When We Were Teens) (1998, ep)
- Total Noise (1998 demo tape, reissued in 2013)
- Roots of Us - Rave Years (1999, ep)
- Zog Tag (1999 EP, DIY)
- Transfusion 219 (2001 EP, DIY)
- Problematic Memories (2001 EP DIY)
- R U Digitall !? (2002 demo album)
- Mirror Mirror (2003 ep)

== Studio albums ==
- Abnormal Waltz (1998 album, reissued in 2007)
- Mr Borndeads Feast (2004)
- Future Porn Machine (2007)
- EI Conquistadors (2009)
- dreDDup (2011)
- Nautilus (2012)
- I Dreamt of a Dragon (2014)
- DeathOven: Rebels Have No Kings (2016)
- Soyuz (2018)
- Romance of Romans (2021)
- Pan/Dora (2024)
- Language of Ice (TBA)

== DIY cassette releases ==
- Roots od Them (1998 EP, DIY)
- 219 demos 1997-2002 (2002 collection of demo recordings)

== Side projects and acts ==
- MRT, experimental ambient industrial
- cUtNpAsTe, industrial metal

== See also ==
- List of industrial music bands

== External links and sources ==
- Official Facebook page
- dreDDup at Discogs
- dreDDup Bandcamp page
- Terapija Magazine review
- Helly-Cherry review
- DREDDUP: Soyuz
- Novosadska promocija knjige "Ilustrovana enciklopedija rok muzike u Vojvodini" | Balkanrock.com
- Mihajlo Obrenov (dreDDup) za SMP: Postojaćemo dok je god ljudi koji veruju u našu muziku
- Mihajlo Obrenov: Ljudsko telo je najsavršenija tehnologija na planeti [poslednji intervju]
