= Radar (disambiguation) =

Radar is an acronym for "radio detection and ranging", referring to a system for using radio waves to detect and track the position of objects.

Radar may also refer to:

== RADAR acronym ==
- Research on Adverse Drug Events and Reports, United States, manages alerts for adverse reactions to drugs
- The Royal Association for Disability Rights, United Kingdom

== Entertainment ==
- "Radar" (song), by Britney Spears, 2009
- "Radar", a song by Chris Whitley from the album Rocket House, 2001
- "Radar", a song by Comet Gain from the album Tigertown Pictures, 1999
- "Radar", a song by John Fogerty from the album Deja Vu All Over Again, 2004
- "Radar", a song by Katie Noonan and the Captains from the album Emperor's Box, 2010
- "Radar", a song by Alpha P from the EP King of the Wolves, 2019
- "Radar", a song by Laurie Anderson from the album Home of the Brave, 1986
- "Radar", a song by Lonely the Brave from the album Things Will Matter, 2016
- "Radar", a song by Members Only from the album Members Only, Vol. 4, 2019
- "Radar", a song by Morphine from the album Yes, 1995
- "Radar", a song by NoCap from the album Steel Human, 2020
- "Radar", a song by Playboi Carti from the album Music, 2025
- "Radar", a song by Riz Ahmed from the album Microscope, 2011
- "Radar", a song by Rova Saxophone Quartet from the album Totally Spinning, 2006
- "Radar", a song by Teen from the album Good Fruit, 2019
- "Radar", a musical piece by Bernard Herrmann on The Day the Earth Stood Still soundtrack
- "Raydar", a song by JID from The Forever Story, 2022
- Radar Records, a record label
- Radar, an album by Jorge Drexler
- Radar, a band with Sonny Condell
- Radar (magazine)
- Radar (radio station), an Australian radio station
- Radar, a teddy bear of the Big Bird muppet character
- Rádio Radar, a Portuguese radio station

== People ==
- Te Radar, New Zealand comedian and television personality
- Nickname of Al Arbour (1932–2015), National Hockey League player and coach
- Radar O'Reilly, character in the M*A*S*H franchise, see List of M*A*S*H characters#Radar O'Reilly

== Newspapers, periodicals and websites ==
- Radar Surabaya
- Radar Depok
- Radar Bogor
- Radar Cirebon
- Radar Sukabumi
- Radar Tasikmalaya
- Radar Sumedang
- Radar Pekalongan
- Radar Banyumas
- Radar Tegal
- Radar Kudus
- Radar Bekasi
- Radar Bandung
- Radar Sulteng
- Radar Sampit
- Radar Selatan
- Radar Banjarmasin
- Radar Semarang
- Radar Solo
- Radar Jogja
- Radar Madiun
- Radar Kediri
- Radar Bromo
- Radar Bojonegoro
- Radar Madura
- Radar Tulungagung
- Radar Bali
- Radar Sulbar
- Radar Timika
- Radar Sorong
- Radar Banyuwangi
- Radar Jember
- Radar Lampung
- Radar Bone
- Radar Tarakan
- Radar Malang
- Radar Bengkulu
- Radar Bute
- Radar Sarko
- Radar Utara
- Radar Lebong
- Radar Kepahiang
- Radar Lamsel
- Radar Lambar
- Radar Lamteng
- Radar Seluma
- Radar Tanjab
- Gary Burghoff, actor of Radar in M*A*S*H

== Other uses ==
- Radar.net, a photo sharing website and application that allowed users to share pictures and videos
- RADAR (audio recorder), a product line of multitrack digital audio recorders
- Radar Auto, an electric vehicle brand owned by Geely
- R.A.D.A.R.: The Adventures of the Bionic Dog, 2023 American film
