= Before I Disappear Again =

Studio album by NoCap
- Released: August 16, 2024
- Length: 71:01
- Label: Atlantic
- Producers: 17OnDaTrack; 94thegenius; Al Geno; ALyX; Audio Jacc; Bak Beats; Biirthplace; Bijan Amir; Cheese; Darkside 3x; David Morse; Dreamlife Beats; EchoBeats; Fantom; FantomPower; Foreigngotem; FrankGotThePack; Garmvn; Harto Beats; Haze; Hoops; Jambo; JayForeiign; Jayrich Laplaya; J Miller; Joeydkeyz; KaiGoinKrazy; KookUp; LastHaze; L.A. The Brotherman; LC; MalikOTB; Martin Sole; Morgan O’Connor; Omar Guetfa; Pi'erre Bourne; Prezzley P.; Reapyy; Selfmade Retro; Str8cash; Synco; Tilt; VenoTheBuilder; Wonderyo; Xynothing; Zuus

NoCap chronology
The Main Bird (2022)	Before I Disappear Again (2024)	Heaven On Mars (2026)

Singles from Before I Disappear Again
- 1. "Baby Drake" Released: June 8, 2024; 2. "Yacht Party" Released: July 12, 2024; 3. "Maliboo" Released: August 2, 2024

Before I Disappear Again is the second studio album by American rapper NoCap, released on August 16, 2024, by Atlantic Records. This album features guest appearances from D'Yani, French Montana, Quavo, Rylo Rodriguez, Sleepy Hallow, and SoFaygo, alongside production from Cheese, Dreamlife Beats, FrankGotThePack, Pi'erre Bourne, Selfmade Retro, Str8cash, and Gene "Al Geno" Hixon who mixed and mastered the entirety of the record. The album serves as a follow-up to Crawford's fifth solo mixtape, The Main Bird (2022). The album was supported by three singles, "Baby Drake", "Yacht Party", & "Maliboo". The album debuted at number 18 on the US Billboard 200 chart and number 2 on the Billboard Top R&B/Hip-Hop Albums chart, selling approximately 23,377 equivalent-album units in its first week.

The album was supported by three official singles: "Baby Drake", "Yacht Party", and "Maliboo".

== Background ==
The album's fourteenth cut, "Drown in My Styrofoam" was released almost four years before the album on September 14, 2020, exclusively on YouTube. NoCap first teased the album's tracklist on December 23, 2023, asking his fans if it's "too long". On March 24, 2024, NoCap took to Instagram to share the album's official cover art and announce its release for April 16, 2024. On April 16, despite the album not releasing as planned, NoCap announced the album's tracklist featuring D'Yani, Rylo Rodriguez, Hunxho, Quavo, Sleepy Hallow, and Jessie Reyez. On June 8, 2024, NoCap released a music video of the album's twelfth cut, "Baby Drake" exclusively on YouTube. The album's second single, "Yacht Party" was released on July 12, 2024. The album's third single "Maliboo" was released on August 2, 2024.

Upon the album's release, on August 16, Crawford appeared in an interview with Uproxx in which he spoke about some of the album's tracks, as well as hinting at the release of a sequel project with Rylo Rodriguez, Rogerville 2. Crawford also spoke about the meaning behind the album's title:

Like you said, I’ve been gone for two, three years working on myself [laughs]. Ain’t no telling when I might have to do that again. Hopefully, I don’t disappear again too soon, but ain’t no telling when I have to go back and work on myself again. Yeah, we artists, but at the same time, we live real life. We’re human, we’re not robots. I just get back in that work mode, sometimes I’m worried about myself. That’s all that’s about really.

== Track listing ==
Before I Disappear Again track listing
No.	Title	Writer(s)	Producer(s)	Length
1.	"Champain"	Kobe Vidal Crawford; Jason Goldberg; Sven Steenbergen; Henri Velasco	Cheese; 17OnDaTrack; Hoops	3:40
2.	"Far From Nigeria"	Crawford; Kevin Moore; Richard DeBerry; Justin Miller; Justin Perez; Jonoah Pressley	94thegenius; Jayrich Laplaya; J Miller; LA the brotherman; Prezzley P.	3:52
3.	"Feelings" (with D'Yani)	Crawford; Andre McCormack; Nicholas Anthony Valentino Graham	Nicholas Anthony Valentino Graham	3:35
4.	"Sack Vision"	Crawford; Moore; DeBerry; Miller; Perez	94thegenius; Jayrich Laplaya; J Miller; LA the brotherman	2:59
5.	"Invoice" (featuring Rylo Rodriguez)	Crawford; Ryan Adams; Bijan Amirkhani; Justin Mitchell; Kuion Martin; Omar-Rayan Guetfa	Bijan Amir; Darkside 3x; Martin Sole; Omar Guetfa	2:24
6.	"Yatcht Party"	Crawford; Morgan O'Connor; Alex Bak	Morgan O'Connor; Bak Beats	3:42
7.	"Assist"	Crawford; Gene Hixon; Jan Branicki; Joel Desroches	Al Geno; Dreamlife Beats; Joeydkeyz	2:43
8.	"Cat Piss" (featuring French Montana)	Crawford; Karim Kharbouch; Hixon; Vid Vucenovic; Vincent Charette	Al Geno; Foreigngotem; Tilt	3:55
9.	"One More Summer"	Crawford; Hixon; Luke Clay	Al Geno; LC; ALyX^{[a]}; Wonderyo^{[a]}	2:36
10.	"Celean" (featuring Quavo)	Crawford; Quavious Marshall; Moises Marin; David Morse; Kai Hasegawa	Biirthplace; David Morse; KaiGoinKrazy	2:44
11.	"Judge the Jury"	Crawford; Ceary Houston	VenoTheBuilder	3:04
12.	"Baby Drake"	Crawford; Jayden Rolle; Jerard Palacious; Isak Gidgård	JayForeiign; Selfmade Retro; Str8cash	3:06
13.	"Keep me Waitng"	Crawford; Gidgård; Alexander Wu	Str8cash; Synco	3:25
14.	"Drown in My Styrofoam"	Crawford; Cartier Britz	Fantom	3:10
15.	"Maliboo"	Crawford; Justus Yearous; Ryan Hartlove; Kai Hasegawa; Iggy Börjesson	Fantompower; Harto Beats; KaiGoinKrazy; Reapyy	3:25
16.	"Stuck on You"	Crawford; Hixon; Jack Cohen-Mungun; Erin Ruppellungan	Al Geno; Audio Jacc; LastHaze	2:58
17.	"Peepholes"	Crawford; James Frank; Ethan Hayes; Malik Bynoe-Fisher; Brian Mitchell	FrankGotThePack; Haze; MalikOTB; Zuus	2:43
18.	"Bridge in London" (featuring Sleepy Hallow)	Crawford; Tegan Chambers; Hixon; Daniel Nduwimana; Machado Joseph	Al Geno; KookUp; Xynothing	2:10
19.	"Diamond Blick"	Crawford; Frank; Gidgård	FrankGotThePack; Str8cash	2:54
20.	"Die for Me" (featuring SoFaygo)	Crawford; Andre Burt Jr.; Jordan Jenks	Pi'erre Bourne	3:27
21.	"Mistweaver"	Crawford; Hixon; Clay	Al Geno; LC	2:38
22.	"Greece or Sweden" (featuring Rylo Rodriguez)	Crawford; Adams; Rasmus Kjær; Raúl Bermejo	Garmvn; Jambo	3:02
23.	"Front Row"	Crawford; Hixon; Branicki; Desroches	Al Geno; Dreamlife Beats; Joeydkeyz	2:47
Total length:				71:01

- ^{^[a]} signifies an uncredited producer

== Personnel ==
Musicians

- NoCap – rap vocals
- D'Yani – vocals (3)
- Rylo Rodriguez – rap vocals (5, 22)
- French Montana - rap vocals (8)
- Quavo – rap vocals (10)
- Hunxho – rap vocals (13)
- Sleepy Hallow – rap vocals (18)
- SoFaygo - rap vocals (20)

Technical

- Gene "Al Geno" Hixon – mastering, mixing

== Charts ==
=== Weekly charts ===
Weekly chart performance for Before I Disappear Again
Chart (2024)	Peak position
US Billboard 200	18
US Top R&B/Hip-Hop Albums (Billboard)	3

=== Year-end charts ===
Year-end chart performance for Before I Disappear Again
Chart (2024)	Position
US Top R&B/Hip-Hop Albums (Billboard)	92
