= Fuckfest =

Fuckfest may refer to:

- a sexual slang term for multiple sexual intercourse, especially group sex
- Fuckfest (album), a 1989 album by Oxbow
- "Fuckfest", a song on the 2000 Big Ed album Special Forces
- "FuckFest", a song on the 2007 Dreddup album Future Porn Machine

== See also ==
- The dictionary definition of -fest at Wiktionary
