= I Dreamt of a Dragon =

Studio album by dreDDup
- Released: 2014
- Recorded: 2014
- Genre: industrial
- Length: 51:26
- Label: Lampshade Media
- Producer: miKKa

DreDDup chronology
Nautilus (2012)	I Dreamt of a Dragon (2014)

I Dreamt of a Dragon is the sixth official studio album by Serbian industrial group dreDDup. I Dreamt of a Dragon came as a surprise to their fans, with the band abandoning their aggressive style of music in favor of a more electronic and commercial sound. It was recorded during the period 2013–2014 in DURU studio. The complete production, mastering, and mixing were done by miKKa. The album's story revolves around a new beginning after the conclusion of the Nautilus story. The light after darkness is the main theme for dreDDup. Album cover was created by artists Blanka Pavlović and Bojana Jarošenko. This album also includes guest musicians such as Mar2tA of Zbogom Brus Li, Dario Seraval of Borghesia and actress Ljuma Penov. The album is still awaiting a record deal.

== Track listing ==
1. LeedSkalNin – 1:07
2. Fuck Me Like There's No Tomorrow – 4:04
3. We Sperm Noise – 4:29
4. Cannibal Drive – 4:29
5. They Live We Sleep – 5:26
6. Pussy Control Panel – 4:42
7. Wet4Vet – 4:29
8. TamTamTam – 4:37
9. Sadam and Eve – 2:31
10. Marquis de Novi Sad – 1:01
11. Robots of Death – 5:15
12. Etika – 4:07
13. Wake Me When This world Dies – 5:09

== Personnel ==
- Mihajlo Obrenov (a.k.a. Inquisitor or miKKa) – lead vocals, electronics
- Ivan Francuski (a.k.a. Frantz) – drums
- Alen Habek (a.k.a. Armageddon) – lead guitar
- Aleksandra Vukošić (a.k.a. XXXandra) – bass
- Dario Seraval – back vocals
- Marta Csoór – back vocals
- Ljuma Penov – back vocals
