= The Hood Dictionary =

Mixtape by NoCap
- Released: November 19, 2019
- Genre: Hip hop
- Length: 45:19
- Labels: Atlantic; Never Broke Again
- Producers: Audio Jacc; Beatmonster Marc; CashMoneyAP; Chapo; Clay Priskorn; Danny Wolf; Felipe S; Gerson Zaragoza; Hurtboy AG; Jambo; J Inc.; Juse Dayne; ManOhManFoster; MTK; Nathan Ton; Otxhello; Outtatown; Rude Dolph; SephGotTheWaves; Young Cutta; YoungKimJ; YungXansei

NoCap chronology
The Backend Child (2019)	The Hood Dictionary (2019)	Steel Human (2020)

Singles from The Hood Dictionary
- 1. "First Day In" Released: September 27, 2019; 2. "Ghetto Angels (Remix)" Released: September 30, 2019; 3. "What You Know" Released: November 15, 2019

The Hood Dictionary is the fourth mixtape by American rapper NoCap. It was released on November 19, 2019, by Atlantic Records and Never Broke Again. The mixtape features guest appearances from Quando Rondo, Lil Durk, and Jagged Edge. Meanwhile, the mixtape was handled by a variety of prestigious producers including CashMoneyAP, SephGotTheWaves, Outtatown, Rude Dolph, Jambo, Otxhello, Young Cutta, and YoungKimJ, among others.

The mixtape was supported by three singles: "First Day In", "Ghetto Angels (Remix)" featuring Lil Durk and Jagged Edge, and "What You Know". The mixtape debuted at number 80 on the US Billboard 200.

== Promotion ==
=== Singles ===
The lead single for the mixtape, "First Day In", was released on September 27, 2019. The second single, "Ghetto Angels (Remix)" featuring Lil Durk and Jagged Edge, was released on September 30, 2019. And, the third and final single for the mixtape, "What You Know", was released on November 15, 2019.

=== Music videos ===
The first music video for the song, "Ghetto Angels (Remix)", was released on November 11, 2019. The second music video, "Still Me", was released on November 24, 2019, five days after the mixtape's release. The third music video, "In 4", was released on December 14, 2019. And, the fourth and last music video, "Brag Different", was released on December 19, 2019.

== Commercial performance ==
In the United States, on November 30, 2019, The Hood Dictionary debuted at number 80 on the US Billboard 200 chart on its first week, which became NoCap's second chart entry. The mixtape peaked at number 39 on the US Top R&B/Hip-Hop Albums chart, which also became NoCap's first entry on the chart overall.

== Track listing ==
Credits adapted from Tidal and Genius.

All tracks are written by Kobe Crawford.

The Hood Dictionary track listing
No.	Title	Producer(s)	Length
1.	"In 4"	Young Cutta; Beatmonster Marc^{[a]}	2:52
2.	"Still Me"	CashMoneyAP; Felipe S	2:24
3.	"What You Know"	Nathan Ton	2:38
4.	"Pour Up"	Outtatown; Jambo	3:59
5.	"Flies"	Audio Jacc; J Inc.	2:40
6.	"Take Care"	SephGotTheWaves; YungXansei	2:12
7.	"Bankroll"	Audio Jacc; J Inc.; ManOhManFoster; Hurtboy AG	2:25
8.	"Shot Fired"	Danny Wolf; Otxhello; MTK; Gerson Zaragoza	2:11
9.	"Brag Different" (featuring Quando Rondo)	CashMoneyAP; Chapo	2:47
10.	"Heaven Gates"	Jambo	3:03
11.	"Same Thing"	YoungKimJ; Rude Dolph	3:35
12.	"The Way It Is"	Audio Jacc	2:43
13.	"Country Boy"	Audio Jacc	2:47
14.	"Harder Than Hard"	Audio Jacc; ManOhManFoster; Hurtboy AG; Clay Priskorn	2:27
15.	"First Day In"	YoungKimJ	2:36
16.	"Ghetto Angels (Remix)" (featuring Lil Durk and Jagged Edge)	Juse Dayne	4:00
Total length:			45:19

=== Notes ===
- ^{^[a]} signifies an uncredited additional producer

== Personnel ==
Credits adapted from Tidal.

=== Vocalists ===
- NoCap – primary artist
- Quando Rondo – featured artist (track 9)
- Lil Durk – featured artist (track 16)
- Jagged Edge – featured artist (track 16)

=== Production ===
- Young Cutta – producer (track 1)
- Beatmonster Marc – uncredited additional producer (track 1)
- CashMoneyAP – producer (track 2 and 9)
- Felipe S – producer (track 2)
- Nathan Ton – producer (track 3)
- Outtatown – producer (track 4)
- Jambo – producer (track 4, 10)
- Audio Jacc – producer (track 5, 7, 12–14)
- J Inc. – producer (track 5, 7)
- SephGotTheWaves – producer (track 6)
- YungXansei - producer (track 6)
- ManOhManFoster – producer (track 7, 14)
- Hurtboy AG – producer (track 7, 14)
- Danny Wolf – producer (track 8)
- Otxhello – producer (track 8)
- MTK – producer (track 8)
- Gerson Zaragoza – producer (track 8)
- Chapo – producer (track 9)
- YoungKimJ – producer (track 11, 15)
- Rude Dolph – producer (track 11)
- Clay Priskorn – producer (track 14)
- Just Dayne – producer (track 16)
- Paul Ian Bailey – recording engineer (track 2, 3, 5–9, 11–14), mixing engineer (track 5–8, 11–14)

== Charts ==
Chart performance for The Hood Dictionary
Chart (2019)	Peak position
US Billboard 200	80
US Top R&B/Hip-Hop Albums (Billboard)	39
