= DreDDup (album) =

Album by DreDDup

dreDDup

Studio album by dreDDup
- Released: 2011
- Recorded: 2010
- Genre: industrial
- Length: ca.69min. 40 sec.
- Label: dPulse Recordings
- Producer: miKKa

DreDDup chronology
El Conquistadors (2009)	dreDDup (2011)	none

Professional ratings
Review scores
Source	Rating
Terapija Magazine	

dreDDup is the fourth official album of Serbian industrial group dreDDup. It was recorded during the period 2008-2010 in DURU studio. The band aimed to create something completely different, changing their sound to a massacre crossover, abandoning their original style. This was the first album featuring the new line-up. The album 'dreDDup' tells a story from the dark diary. For artistic inspiration, Mikka watched and read gruesome real-time horror documentaries, so horrific that they caused real damage to his psyche during the recording period. The album was self-titled because dreDDup wanted to complete the story with this release and conclude their studio recordings. The artwork was created by the artist Bojana Jarošenko and the 91 Design team. The album also included guest musicians such as Roko of f.O.F, Bojan from KOH, Laura from Talbot's Curse, and Bajs from Kleimor. The complete production, mastering, and mixing were done by miKKa. The album was released by dPulse Recordings in February 2011. and later re-released for SKCNS.

== Track listing ==
1. People are Dead – 1:03
2. Set Me on Fire – 5:33
3. oNe is Alive – 5:17
4. Animal Takes Over – 4:12
5. When Dead Come Home – 6:15
6. Dirt – 6:35
7. God of FM Stereo – 5:06
8. Mr Fooz – 2:35
9. Wheels – 3:49
10. Inject the Poison – 4:00
11. Garden of Dead Friends – 5:32
12. Undo Yourself – 3:58
13. Machine – 3:36
14. Videotape – 2:43
15. Heartbeat Away – 5:01
16. Footfalls – 4:04

== Personnel ==
- Mihajlo Obrenov; miKKa – lead vocals, electronics
- Ivan Francuski – drums
- Alen Habek – lead guitar
- Aleksandra Vukosic – bass
- Bojan Petkovic – rhythm guitar
- Roko Katalinic – back vocals
- Sinisa Bajic – back vocals
- Laura Greenwood – back vocals

=== Production ===
- miKKa – engineer and remastering
- Gabe Wilkinson – vocals engineer

== Sources ==
- https://www.amazon.com/Dreddup/dp/B004M5TWFI/ref=sr_1_1?ie=UTF8&qid=1299362422&sr=8-1
- http://dpulse-europe.com/store/products/dreDDup-dreDDup.html
- http://www.terapija.net/mjuzik.asp?ID=10485
- http://www.trablmejker.com/emisije/2/1991
