= Mr. Crawford (album) =

Studio album by NoCap
- Released: April 29, 2022
- Genre: Hip hop
- Length: 58:48
- Label: Atlantic; Never Broke Again
- Producer: 12Hunna; Al Geno; Audio Jacc; Billboard Hitmakers; BJ Beatz; Blake Slatkin; BrandoBands; Cheese; Darkside 3x; Dez Wright; Dior; DY Krazy; Einer Bankz; Flu Wop; Go Grizzly; Harto Beats; Hoops; Jambo; Jarom Su’a; JustAcoustic; Keyz on the beat; Kingabba; KookUp; LayZBeats; LC; lvl35dav; Nash Beats; Nick Mira; Nick Seeley; Nikko; Prod By Scorp; RMG Nu; Rude Dolph; Spaceman; Take a Daytrip; Taz Taylor

NoCap chronology
Steel Human (2020)	Mr. Crawford (2022)	The Main Bird (2022)

Singles from Mr. Crawford
- 1. "Vaccine" Released: August 8, 2021; 2. "Vaccine (Falling Star)" Released: August 8, 2021; 3. "I’ll Be Here" Released: February 23, 2022; 4. "Shackles to Diamonds" Released: March 16, 2022; 5. "Save The Day" Released: April 21, 2022

Mr. Crawford is the debut studio album by American rapper NoCap. It was released on April 29, 2022, through Atlantic Records and Never Broke Again, Which would be the last and only album to be released under Never Broke Again due to their relation issues. The album features production from several established producers in the rap industry such as Einer Bankz, Nick Mira, Take a Daytrip, and Taz Taylor.

Mr. Crawford was supported by five singles: "Vaccine", "Vaccine (Falling Star)", "I'll Be Here", "Shackles to Diamonds", and "Save the Day". The album received generally positive reviews from music critics. It debuted at number eight on the US Billboard 200 chart, earning 29,000 album-equivalent units in its first week.

== Background ==
The album's title relates to NoCap's birth name, Kobe Vidal Crawford.

On March 16, 2022, via Facebook, Cap changed his profile picture to an alternate cover art. NoCap announced the official release of the album via social media on March 28, 2022, while leaving a message for his supporters:

"I'm probably more excited about this album than y'all, I keep making changes last minute switching songs cause I make new music everyday and I want this bitch perfect I come from ZERO I put my heart & soul into this shit can't nothing stop me but the judge or the grave yard & not these bitch ass industry niggaz I'll forever stay true to myself cause dats how slim raised me 🦈 niggaz I will give my last talk about me behind my back & I still wish them the best on life cause deep down inside they know who I really am MR.CRAWFORD. 4/29"

== Singles ==
The album's first two singles, "Vaccine" and "Vaccine (Falling Star)", were released on August 8, 2021, exclusively on YouTube; it was released to streaming services on August 19, 2021. The album's third single, "I'll Be Here", was released on February 24, 2022, also exclusively on YouTube; it was released on all digital platforms on March 15, 2022. The album's fourth single "Shackles to Diamonds" was released on March 16, 2022. The album's fifth and final single "Save The Day" featuring Kodak Black was released on April 21, 2022.

== Critical reception ==
Professional ratings
Review scores
Source	Rating
AllMusic	4/5 stars

Mr. Crawford received positive reviews by music critics. AllMusic compares the album to NoCap's 2020 mixtape Steel Human as they share the same "Auto-Tuned melodies and fluid, quick-switching flows." The review notes that after sampling Jay-Z and Lil Wayne, NoCap "takes enormous steps forward with this debut as he presents more depth and personality than ever before."

== Commercial performance ==
Mr. Crawford debuted at number eight on the US Billboard 200 chart, earning 29,000 album-equivalent units (including 300 copies in pure album sales) in its first week. The album also accumulated a total of 40.07 million on-demand streams of the album's songs.

== Track listing ==
Mr. Crawford track listing
No.	Title	Writer(s)	Producer(s)	Length
1.	"Mr. Crawford"	Kobe Vidal Crawford; Raul Bermejo	Jambo	3:41
2.	"FTW"	Crawford; Michael Brendan O'Brien; Brandon Russell; Jason Goldberg; Dwan Avery; Campbell Rolston-Clemmer	12 Hunna; Bj Beatz; Cheese; DY Krazy; Spaceman	2:30
3.	"Vaccine"	Crawford; Gene Hixon; Daniel Nduwimana	Al'Geno; KookUp	2:06
4.	"Vaccine (Falling Star)"	Crawford; Hixon; Nduwimana	Al'Geno; KookUp	2:24
5.	"Very Special"	Crawford; Kevin Price	Go Grizzly	2:18
6.	"I'll Be Real"	Crawford; Justin Mitchell; James Jarvis	Darkside 3x; JustAcoustic	3:57
7.	"Go-Realer"	Crawford; Mitchell; Aaron Nelson; Antonio Balderas Barba; Nicholas Bosco	Darkside 3x; Eiby; Keyz on the beat; Nikko	2:55
8.	"Took a Risk"	Crawford; James Afflu; Christopher Billiot	Flu Wop	2:43
9.	"Shackles to Diamonds"	Crawford; Hixon; Nick Seeley; Davood Nadimi Boushehri	Al'Geno; Nick Seeley; lvl35dav	2:57
10.	"Comfortable Numb"	Crawford; Nicholas Bosco	Nikko	3:47
11.	"Choppas and Ferraris"	Crawford; Mitchell; James Jarvis; Jarom Su’a	Darkside 3x; JustAcoustic; Jarom Su’a	2:41
12.	"House Bigger"	Crawford; Jenu McLucas	RMG Nu	2:42
13.	"Road to Riches"	Crawford; Benjamin Joseph Hubble; Izayah Alexander	LayZBeats; Prod By Scorp; Dior	2:16
14.	"Swiping Cards"	Crawford; Dylan Taylor Clearly-Kell; Henri Velasco	Dez Wright; Hoops	1:35
15.	"Untouchable"	Crawford; Jack Mungan; Lionel Rudolf	Audio Jacc; Rude Dolph	2:36
16.	"Forever Loading"	Crawford; Price; Eduardo Burgess; Jonathan De la Rosa	Go Grizzly; Billboard Hitmakers	3:18
17.	"Save the Day" (featuring Kodak Black)	Crawford; Bill Kahan Kapri; Bermejo; Ryan Hartlove; Spencer Harris	Einer Bankz; Jambo; Harto Beats	2:36
18.	"Ocean Gold" (featuring Internet Money)	Crawford; Nicholas Mira; Danny Lee Snodgrass Jr.; Nathan Scott Lamarche	Nick Mira; Taz Taylor; Nash Beats	2:33
19.	"Grenade"	Crawford; Denzel Baptiste; David Biral; Blake Slatkin	Take a Daytrip; Blake Slatkin	3:23
20.	"Flags to the Sky" (featuring YoungBoy Never Broke Again)	Crawford; Kentrell DeSean Gaulden; Brandon Cantey; Luke Clay	BrandoBands; LC	2:29
21.	"No Hook"	Crawford; Alexander; Clay	Dior; LC	3:23
Total length:				58:48

== Personnel ==
- Al'Geno – mixing (1, 3, 4, 6–14, 16–18, 21), mastering (1, 6–14, 16–18, 21)
- Jason "Cheese" Goldberg – mixing (2, 5, 15, 19, 20), mastering (2–5, 15, 19, 20)

== Charts ==
Chart performance for Mr. Crawford
Chart (2022)	Peak position
US Billboard 200	8
US Top R&B/Hip-Hop Albums (Billboard)	4
