= NoCap =

American rapper (born 1998)

- Born: Kobe Vidal Crawford Jr. August 20, 1998 (age 28); Mobile, Alabama, U.S.
- Genres: Southern hip-hop; trap
- Occupations: Rapper; singer; songwriter
- Years active: 2017–present
- Labels: Atlantic (current); Never Broke Again
- Website: nocap.com

Kobe Vidal Crawford Jr. (born August 20, 1998), known professionally as NoCap, is an American rapper and singer. He signed with YoungBoy Never Broke Again's namesake record label, an imprint of Atlantic Records in 2019. His debut studio album, Mr. Crawford (2022), peaked at number eight on the Billboard 200 and saw widespread critical praise. He is noted for his use of wordplay.

== Early life ==
Kobe Vidal Crawford was born on August 20, 1998, in Mobile, Alabama, and grew up in the Birdsville housing projects on the city's south side. Crawford begun to show interest in music at the age of nine, receiving inspiration from his mother's boyfriend at the time. He would continue to locally perform live shows alongside his brother, however, as the relationship between his mother and her boyfriend ended, Crawford would take a break from music until his teenage years.

== Career ==
=== 2017–2019: Career beginnings and The Hood Dictionary ===
NoCap began his career in earnest with the release of his first EP, Believe It, in May 2017. In early 2018, he released the song "Legend". The music video for that song accumulated over 1 million views on YouTube and would appear on NoCap's debut mixtape, Neighborhood Hero, in July 2018. He followed that with a collaborative mixtape, Rogerville, with Rylo Rodriguez in September 2018. In November of that year, he was featured on the Lil Baby track, "Dreams 2 Reality", off the mixtape, Street Gossip.

In 2019, NoCap signed a record deal with YoungBoy Never Broke Again's Never Broke Again and Atlantic Records. Months later, in March 2019, NoCap released the single, "Punching Bag" produced by CashMoneyAP. Later that month, he released another single, "Ghetto Angels". "Ghetto Angels" has totaled more than 80 million views on YouTube and was certified Platinum by the Recording Industry Association of America. In May, NoCap and Polo G were featured on the CashMoneyAP song, "No Patience". Later that month, he released his second solo mixtape The Backend Child which marked his first appearance on the Billboard 200, debuting at number 170. The project featured guest appearances from Rylo Rodriguez ("Dead Faces"), OMB Peezy ("Demons"), and Quando Rondo ("New Ones"). NoCap also released music videos for songs off the album including those for "Blind Nights", "Set It Off", and "No Jewelry".

In July 2019, NoCap delivered a freestyle as a part of DJ Booth's Bless The Booth series on Tidal. The following month, he released the single, "Exotic", and performed another freestyle on the HotNewHipHop Freestyle Session. He was also featured on the Mozzy song, "Sad Situations". On October 11, 2019, NoCap appeared on "Outta Here Safe" alongside Quando Rondo on YoungBoy's chart-topping mixtape, AI YoungBoy 2. On November 19, 2019, NoCap released his third mixtape, The Hood Dictionary. The mixtape was preceded by three singles, "First Day In", released on September 27, 2019, "Ghetto Angels (Remix)" featuring Lil Durk and Jagged Edge on September 30, 2019, and "What You Know", just a day prior to the release of the mixtape on November 15, 2019. The album featured guest appearances from Quando Rondo, Lil Durk, and Jagged Edge and peaked at number 80 on the Billboard 200.

On July 16, 2020, NoCap released his fourth mixtape, Steel Human, which debuted at number 31 on the Billboard 200. The mixtape was preceded by "Count a Million" featuring Lil Uzi Vert on June 16, 2020. NoCap released three music videos from the project: "By Tonight" on June 22, 2020, "Radar" on July 22, 2020, and "Overtime" on September 15, 2020. In December 2020, NoCap said on Instagram that he would be turning himself into authorities, in connection to a shooting in which he reportedly fired shots at someone his sister had an altercation with. He was charged with shooting into an occupied dwelling and reckless endangerment.

=== 2021–2023: Mr. Crawford and The Main Bird ===
On July 21, 2021, NoCap was released from prison. Weeks after his release, on August 8, 2021, NoCap dropped "Vaccine" and "Vaccine (Falling Star)". "Vaccine" peaked at number 2 on the Bubbling Under Hot 100 and was certified platinum by the RIAA. On February 23, 2022, NoCap released the single "I'll Be Here", followed by "Shackles to Diamonds" on March 16, 2022, and "Save the Day" featuring Kodak Black on April 21, 2022. The singles appeared on NoCap's debut full-length studio album, Mr. Crawford which debuted at number 8 on the Billboard 200, selling 29,000 copies in its first week and becoming his highest charting project. The album included guest appearances from Internet Money, Kodak Black, and NBA YoungBoy.

In November 2022, NoCap entered a heated exchange with Never Broke Again label head, YoungBoy Never Broke Again over social media due to claims of disloyalty on Cap's end. YoungBoy claimed that Cap was scared and refused to defend Quando Rondo following the death of King Von while Cap claimed that YoungBoy was hating on him because his career was taking off. NoCap's last project under Never Broke Again, The Main Bird, was released on December 16, 2022, featuring guest appearances from Rylo Rodriguez and Rob49. Following NoCap's heated exchange with YoungBoy, through Apple Music, it was shown that NoCap's music was no longer licensed to Never Broke Again, indicating his departure from the YoungBoy Never Broke Again-founded label.

Despite not releasing a project and only four singles in 2023, on June 23, 2023, Cap appeared as a feature on long-time collaborator Rylo Rodriguez's "Thang for You" which served as the lead single to Rylo's sophomore album Been One. The single peaked at number 91 on the Billboard Hot 100, marking Cap's first entry on the chart.

=== 2024–present: Before I Disappear Again ===
While teasing his sophomore album for over a year, on March 24, 2024, NoCap finally announced the release of his sophomore album, Before I Disappear Again for April 16, 2024, however, the album would later be pushed back until July 12, 2024. On June 8, NoCap released the album's lead single, "Baby Drake". The album's second single, "Yacht Party" was released on July 12. The album's third single "Maliboo" was released on August 2.

== Legal issues ==
=== 2019: Shooting charge ===
In late 2019, Crawford turned himself in to Alabama police. Crawford was later charged with firing a gun in an occupied building, possession of a controlled substance, and felony violation of probation. He was charged alongside his sister Brianna Crawford who was charged with shooting into an occupied building and reckless endangerment. Sgt. LaDerrick DuBose with the Mobile Police Department stated:

"The victim and another subject were involved in an altercation that turned physical. That subject then summoned for Mr. Crawford to show up. Mr. Crawford showed up, arrived on the scene, and the victim fled into the house. Mr. Crawford then fired shots into the house and then he fled with his sister."

=== 2020–2021: Probation violation ===
In December 2020, Crawford had taken to his official Instagram to announce that he had thirty days to turn himself in:

"I got 30 days to turn myself in & ma dukes tested positive for Covid this morning y'all pray 4 her, I don't know how long ima be gone I just want to appreciate my family, fans & friends for rocking w/ me continue to do that while I'm away, I'm not gone promise y'all nothing because I kno the process of dropping an album is not over night but I'm most definitely pushing for the beginning of da year 'Mr.Crawford The Album So Soon.'"

— @thebackendchild

On January 11, 2021, Crawford turned himself in to police in Alabama regarding his September 2019 case where he allegedly violated his parole. Almost seven months after NoCap's incarceration, on July 21, 2021, he was released from jail.

== Discography ==
=== Studio albums ===
Title	Album details	Peak chart positions		
Title	Album details	US	US R&B/HH	US Rap
Mr. Crawford	Released: April 29, 2022; Label: Never Broke Again, Atlantic; Formats: Digital download, streaming	8	4	3
Before I Disappear Again	Released: August 16, 2024; Label: Atlantic; Formats: Digital download, streaming	18	3	2
Heaven on Mars	Released: October 2, 2026; Label: Atlantic; Formats: Digital download, streaming	56	17	8

=== Mixtapes ===
List of mixtapes with selected details
Title	Details	Peak chart positions		
Title	Details	US	US R&B/HH	US Rap
Neighborhood Hero	Released: July 24, 2018; Label: Self-released; Formats: Digital download, streaming	—	—	—
Rogerville (with Rylo Rodriguez)	Released: April 19, 2019; Label: Self-released; Formats: Digital download, streaming	—	—	—
The Backend Child	Released: May 28, 2019; Label: Never Broke Again, Atlantic; Formats: Digital download, streaming	170	—	—
The Hood Dictionary	Released: November 19, 2019; Label: Never Broke Again, Atlantic; Formats: Digital download, streaming	80	39	—
Steel Human	Released: July 16, 2020; Label: Never Broke Again, Atlantic; Formats: Digital download, streaming	31	18	17
The Main Bird	Released: December 16, 2022; Label: Never Broke Again, Atlantic; Formats: Digital download, streaming	—	—	—

=== Extended plays ===
Title	Details
Believe It	Released: May 23, 2017; Label: Self-released; Formats: Digital download, streaming

=== Singles ===
==== As lead artist ====
List of singles as a lead artist with selected details
Title	Year	Peak chart position	Certifications	Album
Title	Year	US Bub.	Certifications	Album
"Footwork"	2018	—		Non-album singles
"Texas Love"	2018	—		The Leak
"Homicide" (featuring Rylo Rodriguez)	2018	—		The Leak
"Change U"	2018	—		Neighborhood Hero
"What Is Lxve"	2018	—		Non-album single
"Spaceship Vibes" (featuring Quando Rondo)	2018	—		Menace II Society Vol. 3: Graduation Day
"Point Guard"	2018	—		Non-album single
"How We Roll" (featuring Rylo Rodriguez)	2018	—		Non-album single
"November 14" (featuring Slim)	2019	—		Non-album single
"Innocent"	2019	—		Non-album single
"Ghetto Angels"	2019	—	RIAA: Platinum	The Backend Child
"Blind Nights"	2019	—		The Backend Child
"When I Die" (with Thunder)	2019	—		Non-album single
"Reversible" (with FDW Baybay)	2019	—		Non-album single
"Free Durkio"	2019	—		Non-album single
"Exotic: Freestyle, Pt. 2"	2019	—		Non-album single
"Money Can't Change Me" (featuring Rich the Kid)	2019	—		Non-album single
"First Day In"	2019	—		The Hood Dictionary
"Ghetto Angels (Remix)" (featuring Jagged Edge & Lil Durk)	2019	—		The Hood Dictionary
"What You Know"	2019	—		The Hood Dictionary
"Stop Spinnin"	2020	—		Non-album single
"When I Die" (with BornsCapalot)	2020	—		Non-album single
"TheHOODDoctor"	2020	—		Non-album single
"Diverse" (with LBS Kee'Vin)	2020	—		Belair Baby
"Count a Million" (featuring Lil Uzi Vert)	2020	—		Steel Human
"Mistake"	2020	—		Non-album single
"I Can't Change" (with $tupid Young & Steelz)	2020	—		From Here On Out
"I Can't"	2020	—		Non-album single
"Free Draco"	2020	—		Non-album single
"Pain Show"	2020	—		Non-album single
"Love Lost (Remix)" (with Bigga Don)	2021	—		Non-album single
"38 Sides" (featuring YoungBoy Never Broke Again)	2021	—		Non-album single
"On Purpose"	2021	—		Non-album single
"Time Speed"	2021	—		Non-album single
"Vaccine"	2021	2	RIAA: Platinum	Mr. Crawford
"Outside"	2021	—		Non-album single
"Unwanted Lifestyle"	2021	—		Non-album single
"No One Here" (with Lul Bob)	2021	—		Soul Bleed
"200 or Better"	2021	—		Non-album single
"Fortune Teller"	2022	—		Non-album single
"I'll Be Here"	2022	—	RIAA: Gold	Mr. Crawford
"Shackles to Diamonds"	2022	—		Mr. Crawford
"Very Special"	2022	—		Mr. Crawford
"Save The Day" (featuring Kodak Black)	2022	—		Mr. Crawford
"Need Someone to Love"	2022	—		Non-album single
"Long Live" (with So Supa)	2022	—		Non-album single
"I See You"	2022	—		Non-album single
"Heaven For Thugs (Letter to Wap)"	2022	—		Non-album single
"Went Deaf"	2022	—		Non-album single
"Valuable Souls"	2022	—		Non-album single
"DNA"	2022	—		Non-album single
"Dark Clouds" (with Mg Lil Bubba)	2022	—		Non-album single
"Dangerous Girls"	2022	—		Non-album single
"Deadicated"	2023	—		Non-album single
"Head Doctor" (solo or remix featuring Lil Tecca)	2023	—		Non-album single
"Cuban Links"	2023	—		Non-album single
"Drug Habits"	2023	—		Non-album single
"Baby Drake"	2024	—		Before I Disappear Again
"Yacht Party"	2024	—		Before I Disappear Again
"Maliboo"	2024	—		Before I Disappear Again
"Always on Time" (with Perfect Timing)	2024	—		Non-album single
"—" denotes a recording that did not chart or was not released in that territory.

==== As featured artist ====
Title	Year	Peak chart positions			Certifications	Album
Title	Year	US	US R&B/HH	US Rap	Certifications	Album
"LightBeam" (Lil Skies featuring NoCap)	2020	—	—	—		Non-album singles
"Diamonds & Dirt Roads" (Landon Cube featuring NoCap)	2023	—	—	—		Non-album singles
"Thang for You" (Rylo Rodriguez featuring NoCap)	2023	91	25	17	RIAA: Platinum	Been One
"What You Need" (BossMan Dlow featuring NoCap)	2024	—	—	—		Dlow Curry

=== Other charted and certified songs ===
Title	Year	Peak chart positions		Certifications	Album
Title	Year	US Bub.	US R&B/HH	Certifications	Album
"Dreams 2 Reality" (Lil Baby featuring NoCap)	2018	—	—	RIAA: Gold	Street Gossip
"Outta Here Safe" (YoungBoy Never Broke Again featuring Quando Rondo and NoCap)	2019	23	—	RIAA: Gold	AI YoungBoy 2
"New Ones" (Quando Rondo featuring NoCap)	2019	—	—	RIAA: Gold	From the Neighborhood to the Stage
"Radar"	2020	—	—	RIAA: Gold	Steel Human
"Angels Smile"	2026	—	49		Heaven on Mars

=== Guest appearances ===
Title	Year	Other performer	Album
"Dreams 2 Reality"	2018	Lil Baby	Street Gossip
"Streets Diary"	2019	Yungeen Ace	Step Harder
"Rumors"	2019	Jose Guapo	Nonchalant
"Stayed Down"	2019	Bloody Jay	Since They Pushed My Shit Back
"Upset"	2019	Yung Honcho, Kevo Muney	Black Heart Honcho
"Chances"	2019	Lil Poppa	Under Investigation 2
"Look In My Eyes"	2019	Doe Boy	Streetz Need Me 2
"Ride & Jugg"	2019	Young Scooter	Trap Hero
"Sad Situations"	2019	Mozzy	—N/a
"AMG"	2019	Marlo, Rylo Rodriguez, Gunna	—N/a
"All of Me"	2020	Lil Durk	—N/a
"Lightbeam"	2020	Lil Skies	—N/a
"IDK Why"	2020	Clever, The Kid LAROI	—N/a
"Handgun"	2020	DaBaby, Polo G	My Brother's Keeper (Long Live G)
"Neverland"	2020	Never Broke Again, Quando Rondo	Ain't Too Long 2
"Situations"	2020	Shy Glizzy	Young Jefe 3
"Used To, Pt.2"	2020	YFN Lucci	HIStory, Lost Pages
"Dead & Famous"	2020	Yung Bleu	Bleu Vandross 3
"Fake Sh!t"	2020	Dee Watkins	Problem Child 2
"Die Young"	2020	Y&R Mookey	Left 4 Dead
"Free The Backend Child"	2020	UnoTheActivist	—N/a
"Situations"	2020	Flo Malcom	—N/a
"Thug Paradise 2"	2021	Soldier Kidd	Soldier Kidd Fly High
"Let's Step"	2021	Sniper Gang, Sykobob, Kodak Black	Nightmare Babies
"Alien Autopsy"	2021	Trippie Redd, Playboi Carti, Sunny2point0	—N/a
"Ghetto Can't Be Saved"	2021	Never Broke Again	Never Broke Again: The Complication Vol.1
"Hood Story"	2021	FCG Heem	Neighborhood Poetry
"Feeling Down"	2021	No Savage	Life of a Savage 2
"The Same"	2022	Meechy Baby	Ratchet Talk
"Going Through It"	2022	Sam James, Moneybagg Yo	—N/a
"Made Me"	2022	Hunxho	Street Poetry
"Forgive Me"	2022	TOB Duke	Time Will Tell
"Honestly"	2022	Ralfy The Plug	iHeartRalfy
"Misguided"	2022	Never Broke Again, Rojay MLP	Never Broke Again Presents: Green Flag Activity
"Two Hunnid"	2022	Never Broke Again, Big B, Bway Yungy	Never Broke Again Presents: Green Flag Activity
"Fashion Killa"	2022	Stunna 4 Vegas	Rae Rae's Son
"Monster"	2022	Dro Kenji	ANYWHERE BUT HERE
"Less Than Me"	2022	KA$HDAMI	WORLD DAMINATION
"Bigger Jeans"	2022	Rich Homie Quan	Family & Mula
"Neighborhood Hero"	2022	Stunna Gambino	Vultures Don't Kry (Deluxe)
"Chosen"	2022	Meechy Baby	Who is Meechy 2
"Losses"	2022	FN Da Dealer	From Nun
"Miss U Already"	2022	Monaleo	—N/a
"Patience"	2022	Hurricane Wisdom	State of Emergency
"Both Ways"	2023	BiC Fizzle	Clark Street Baby
"Diamonds & Dirt Roads"	2023	Landon Cube	—N/a
"Seeing Signs"	2023	Ryan Trey	STREETS SAY YOU MISS ME
"Broke Makes Me Sick"	2023	Young Scooter	Streetz Krazy
"Weeks"	2023	Luh Tyler	My Vision
"No Love"	2023	Rob49	4GOD II (Deluxe)
"Thumbs Down"	2023	Sett	Life of a SlimeCrook
"Unhealthy"	2023	Li Rye	Go Li Rye
"Phone Lights"	2023	Kuttem Reese	—N/a
"Choppa Tunes"	2024	Jdot Breezy	Sorry I Took Long
"My Flowers"	2024	K Camp	Float 2 London
"Find Peace"	2024	YTB Fatt	On Zai
"Hit A Lick"	2024	Tink	Winter's Diary 5
"Shottaz"	2024	MO3	Legend
"Easter Pink"	2024	Loe Shimmy	Zombieland 2.6
"The Type"	2024	Wiz Havinn	Fresh Out The Trenches
"Chosen"	2024	BDifferent	I'm Different
"Wifey"	2024	Skilla Baby	The Coldest
"Set The City On Fire"	2024	FCG Heem	No Hard Feelings
"Ball On My Side"	2024	Dej Loaf, Lil Poppa, Hunxho	End of Summer
"Save Me "	2025	NorthSideBenji	Misery Love Company
"Dying Is Easy"	2025	Kevin Gates	Luca Brasi 4
"Miss Me"	2025	FCG Heem, DeeBaby	Mz. Tania Baby
"Love On An Island"	2025	BAK Jay	Letters I Never Sent
"Ok Cool"	2025	Big Yavo	Dingers
"Black Crows"	2025	Millyz, FCG Heem	Blanco 7
"End-Zone"	2025	BabyTron	Luka Troncic 2
"N.A.M.E"	2025	Offset	Haunted By Fame
"Off My Mind"	2025	Yung Skooley	Sharks Never Stop Swimming 2
"Dark Souls (Remix)"	2025	Fresco Trey	—N/a
"Never Leave"	2026	Lil Tjay	They Just Ain't You
"Still Having Problems"	2026	Luhh Dyl	A Time to Hurt, A Time to Heal
