= Future Porn Machine =

Studio album by dreDDup
- Released: 2007
- Recorded: 2006
- Genre: Industrial
- Length: 73:29
- Label: Insurrection Records; Dadaist Audio
- Producer: miKKa

DreDDup chronology
Works 1996-2007 (2008)	Future Porn Machine (2007)	El Conquistadors (2008)

Professional ratings
Review scores
Source	Rating
Side-Line	(not rated)

Future Porn Machine is the second official album of Serbian industrial group dreDDup. It was first released in 2007 for the Belgrade record label Insurrection Records. The album is a concept album which presents a vision of a distant future where culture has deteriorated to the point where only pornography and machine-made men remain. The album artwork represents the Greek goddess Nike, symbolizing power and victory. Guest musicians on this release include: Joca Ajklula, Merimah, Nikola Vetnic, Khargash and Aleksandar Krajovan.

Works 1996–2007, a compilation album consisting of rare and unreleased dreDDup tracks was released as a promotion for Future Porn Machine. Future Porn Machine was later remastered and re-released in 2008.

== Track listing ==
1. Going Away – 5:36
2. Not From Here – 4:25
3. Never Tell – 3:22
4. W R – 4:13
5. FuckFest – 3:53
6. No More Fingers – 3:51
7. N.O.A. (f Shark) – 3:20
8. Generation Devsatation (metallic mix) – 2:14
9. One – 3:13
10. Reedemer – 3:14
11. When You Know That It's All Wrong – 4:32
12. Defiant – 3:13
13. Bayonet – 3:48
14. If There Is... – 4:53
15. Jinkeez – 3:49
16. Inside Out – 3:54
17. The Secret Song – 4:04
18. Jungle Grey (f Shark) – 4:57

== Personnel ==
- Mihajlo Obrenov; miKKa – lead vocals, electronics, rhythm guitar
- Srdjan Stevanovic – drums
- Darko Izak – lead guitar
- Nemanja Batalo – bass, backing vocals
- Nikola Vetnic – violoncello
- Aleksandar Krajovan – bass
- Jovan Matic – back vocals

=== Production ===
- Nikola Pavlicevic – producers
- miKKa; miKKa – engineer
- miKKa; miKKa – remastering

== Sources ==
- http://www.side-line.com/rss_reviews.php?id=P31388
- https://web.archive.org/web/20080618184239/http://www.fabryka.darknation.eu/php-files_en/readarticle.php?article_id=222
- https://web.archive.org/web/20080618165831/http://caozdravo.com/cms/content/view/62/49/
