= Vaccine (song) =

2021 single by NoCap

Single by NoCap

from the album Mr. Crawford
- Released: August 19, 2021
- Length: 2:06; 2:23 (Falling Star)
- Label: Never Broke Again; Atlantic
- Songwriters: Kobe Crawford Jr.; Gene Hixon; Daniel Nduwimana
- Producers: Al'Geno; KookUp

NoCap singles chronology
"Time Speed" (2021)	"Vaccine" (2021)	"Outside" (2021)

Music video
- "Vaccine" on YouTube

"Vaccine" is a song by American rapper NoCap, released in August 2021 as the lead single from his debut studio album Mr. Crawford (2022). It was produced by Al'Geno and KookUp.

== Background ==
The song was first released exclusively on YouTube as a video single on August 8, 2021. It was released to streaming services on August 19, 2021, as a single of two tracks: the original and a second version titled "Vaccine (Falling Star)"

== Critical reception ==
AllMusic wrote in a review of Mr. Crawford, "Delicate guitar loops guide some of the album's best tracks, in particular the unexpected transition from the mournfully catchy 'Vaccine' to its drums-free counterpart, 'Vaccine (Falling Star),' one of the record's most vulnerable and moving moments."

== Charts ==
Chart (2021)	Peak position
US Bubbling Under Hot 100 Singles (Billboard)	2

== Certifications ==
Region	Certification	Certified units/sales
United States (RIAA)	Platinum	1,000,000^{‡}
^{‡} Sales+streaming figures based on certification alone.
