= Warriors Dance Festival =

Music festival

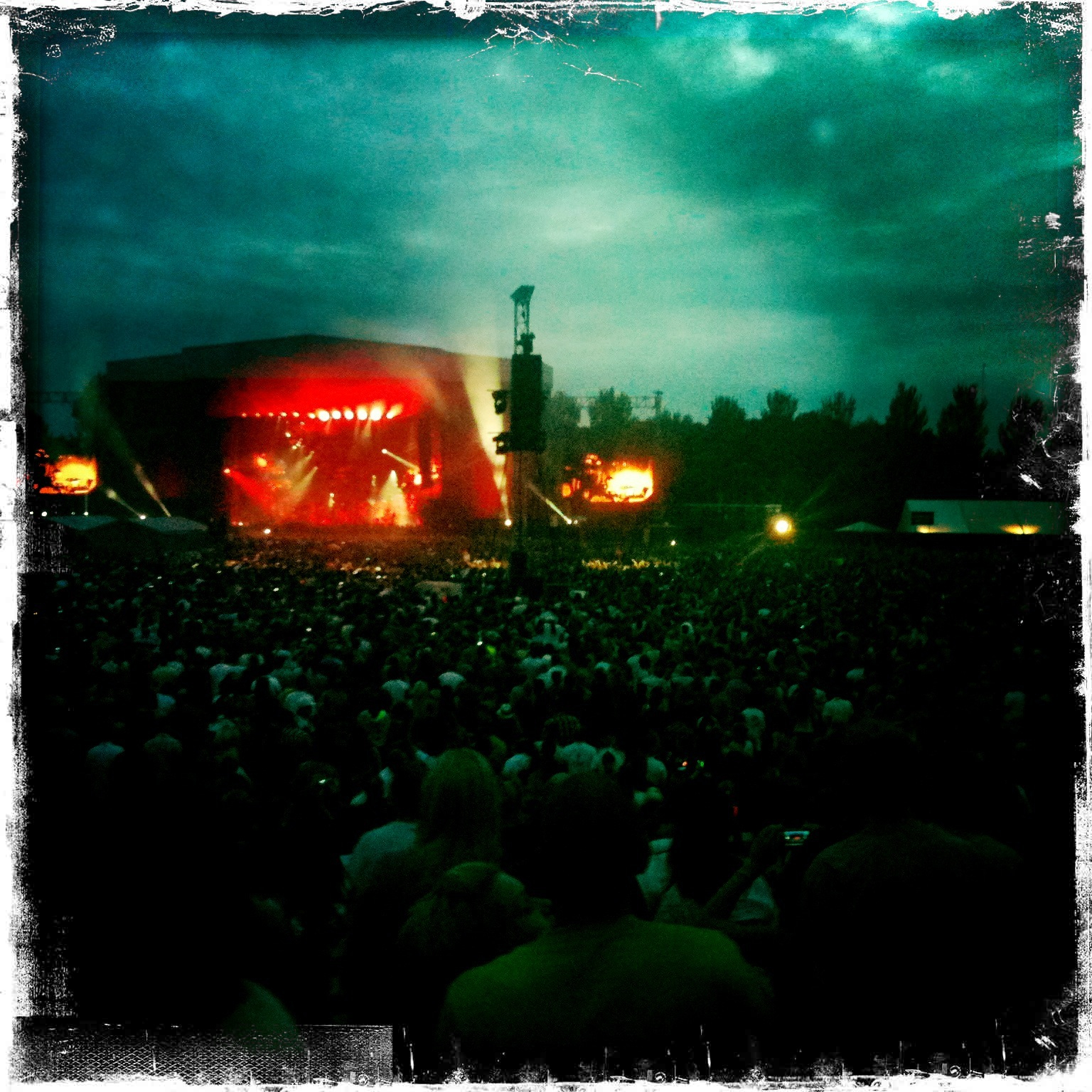
- The Prodigy at Warriors Dance Festival in 2010
- Genre: Electronic music, rock music, drum and bass
- Locations: Japan, United Kingdom, Serbia
- Years active: 2009–2013
- Founders: The Prodigy
- Website: warriorsdancefestival.com

Warrior's Dance Festival was a one-day electronic music and rock music festival curated by The Prodigy.

== History ==
In 2009 the first festival was held in Tokyo, Japan. The lineup included The Prodigy, Pendulum, Hadouken!, MSTRKRFT, AutoKratz and South Central. In 2010 it moved to Milton Keynes Bowl in England, U.K. Headlined by The Prodigy, the event was held over two stages with mainstage performances from Pendulum, Chase & Status, Does It Offend You, Yeah?, Enter Shikari, Doorly, Zane Lowe and Eddy Temple Morris. The second stage was headlined by Gallows with Lethal Bizzle, David Rodigan, Caspa and Hounds.

The third festival was held at Kalemegdan Fortress in Belgrade, Serbia on 15 September 2012. The line up included The Prodigy, Skrillex, Feed Me, Caspa, Zane Lowe, Serbian bands Ritam Nereda, Goblini, Lollobrigida and Eyesburn.

In 2013, the festival took place at the Exit Festival in Novi Sad, Serbia on Friday 12 July. The Prodigy, GBH (band), DJ Fresh, Feed Me, Prototypes, Brookes Brothers, Eyesburn, and South Central.

== See also ==
- List of electronic music festivals
- Live electronic music
