= Hunxho =

American rapper (born 1999)

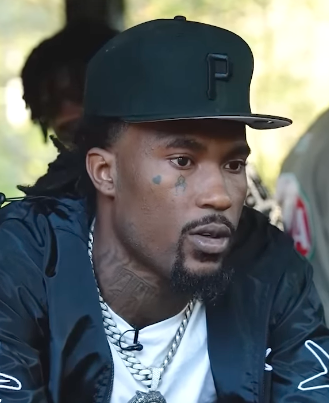
- Hunxho in 2024

Background information
- Also known as: Xho
- Born: Ibrahim Muhammad Dodo; June 20, 1999 (age 27); Greensboro, North Carolina, U.S.
- Origin: Atlanta, Georgia, U.S.
- Genres: Hip hop; trap; Southern hip hop
- Occupations: Rapper; singer; songwriter
- Years active: 2017–present
- Label: 300
- Website: hunxhomusic.com

Ibrahim Muhammad Dodo (born June 20, 1999), known professionally as Hunxho (pronounced "huncho") is an American rapper, singer and songwriter. He is signed to 300 Entertainment. Hunxho initially rose to fame with the song "Let's Get It" in 2021, which spawned a remix with rapper 21 Savage. Later that year, he released the mixtape Street Poet 2.

== Early life ==
Ibrahim Muhammad Dodo was born on June 20, 1999, in Greensboro, North Carolina, to a Nigerian father and African American mother. He was primarily raised in East Atlanta. In high school, Dodo developed an interest in basketball before relocating to Colorado for his college education. He drew inspiration from notable rappers like Young Thug, Rich Homie Quan, Skooly, Future, and Gucci Mane. Before pursuing his rap career, Dodo spent time making money in the East Atlanta streets. He wrote his first song in 2017 and later moved back to Atlanta to focus on his music.

== Career ==
=== Career beginnings ===
Hunxho's single "Let's Get It" (part of his project Street Poet 2) marked the beginning of his success. The song was later remixed by 21 Savage. Following this success, Hunxho signed with 300 Entertainment, which released his first 2022 project, Street Poetry. This album featured the "Let's Get It" remix and the single "Made Me" with NoCap. In 2022, Hunxho released his second project, "Xhosen" (a tribute to his son), on June 16. This project featured WanMor on the single "Heartless" and guest appearances on singles by Lil PJ, Rot Ken, and Lil Darius. In 2023, Hunxho released his first project, "Humble as Ever", which featured the single "Highly Performing". His long-awaited debut album, "22", was released on March 22, 2023. This 22-song project features Tee Grizzley, Yung Mal, and Lil Poppa, and includes prominent singles like "True To My Religion" and "48 Laws Of Power". The concept of "22" was first teased on Xhosen with the single "22", representing his East Atlanta block, his birthday (June 22), and the significant year of 2022, when he was signed, acquitted of his RICO charge, and the age of which he celebrated the birth of his son.

=== 2023–present: For Her, 4 Days in LA and "IOU Tour" ===
Hunxho released the eight-song EP 4 Days in LA in May 2023, featuring Lil Dallas and production from longtime trap producer Murda Beatz. Shortly after, he joined the "It's Only Us Tour" as a supporting act, headlined by Lil Baby, in promotion of his third studio album It's Only Me. Hunxho was accompanied by fellow southern artists Rylo Rodriguez and GloRilla on the nationwide tour.

In June 2024, Hunxho was selected as a member of the 2024 XXL Freshman List.

Hunxho would release his gold-certified single Your Friends on August 23, 2024, as the lead single to his next project, titled For Her which would divert from his traditional sound into music more comparable and oriented towards R&B. Your Friends would be remixed by Summer Walker in 2024.

== Personal life ==
Dodo has three children Zahra, born on New Years 2025, Xoe, born in 2023 and Xhosen, born in 2022. Dodo is a practicing Muslim.

Dodo was previously involved in a relationship with singer, Keyshia Cole.

== Discography ==
=== Studio albums ===
Title	Details	Peak chart positions
Title	Details	US
22	Released: March 22, 2023; Label: 300; Format: Digital download, streaming	—
Thank God	Released: October 25, 2024; Label: 300; Format: Digital download, streaming	87

=== Mixtapes ===
Title	Details	Peak chart positions
Title	Details	US
Hunxhoseason	Released: August 4, 2017; Label: Self-released; Format: Digital download, streaming	—
True Story	Released: January 15, 2018; Label: 1Team Entertainment; Format: Digital download, streaming	—
Suicide and Murder	Released: July 6, 2018; Label: 1Team Entertainment; Format: Digital download, streaming	—
Street Poet	Released: July 14, 2020; Label: 1865 LLC; Format: Digital download, streaming	—
Street Poet 2	Released: July 30, 2021; Label: 1865 LLC; Format: Digital download, streaming	—
Street Poetry	Released: July 30, 2022; Label: 300; Format: Digital download, streaming	—
For Her	Released: October 13, 2023; Label: 300; Format: Digital download, streaming	84
For Us	Released: January 24, 2025; Label: 300; Format: Digital download, streaming	—
For Her 2	Released: September 19, 2025; Label: 300; Format: Digital download, streaming	61

=== Collaborative mixtapes ===
Title	Details
Street Symphony (with Street Symphony)	Released: November 3, 2018; Label: Track or Die, 1165; Format: Digital download, streaming

=== Extended plays ===
Title	Details	Peak chart positions
Title	Details	US
Trench Baby	Released: November 3, 2018; Label: 1Team Entertainment; Format: Digital download, streaming	—
Murda Boyz	Released: June 19, 2021; Label: Self-released; Format: Digital download, streaming	—
Xhosen	Released: June 16, 2022; Label: 300; Format: Digital download, streaming	—
Humble as Ever	Released: January 7, 2023; Label: 300; Format: Digital download, streaming	—
4 Days in LA	Released: May 26, 2023; Label: 300; Format: Digital download, streaming	—
Before the Album	Released: June 7, 2024; Label: 300; Format: Digital download, streaming	197
