= Ljuma Penov =

Serbian actress

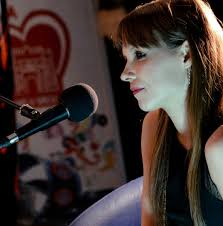
- Born: Belgrade, Serbia, Yugoslavia
- Occupation: Actress
- Years active: 2004–present

Ljuma Penov is a Serbian film and stage actress.

== Early life and career ==
Since she was a child she studied classical ballet, later on besides classical she attended modern dance as well. She finished solo singing studio in Belgrade. She graduated from the secondary school of music in Novi Sad. She studied at the Faculty of Philosophy, Department of History (University of Novi Sad, Serbia). She studied at Academy of Performing Arts in Sarajevo, Bosnia and Herzegovina, studied and graduated from the Academy of Arts (University of Novi Sad, Serbia).

She composes musical pieces for several projects, among them for film and theater plays in Serbia. She appears as a guest vocalist on an album Nautilus (album) by the band DreDDup.

She first drew attention in 2009 as Josie Kilbride in the theater play U močvari (In the Swamp), directed by Egon Savin and based on Irish playwright Marina Carr's play By the Bog of Cats. Dragana Bošković, theater critic of the Belgrade daily, Danas, called Ljuma Penov, "the discovery of this play, an actress about whom, no doubt, much more will be written about. Authentic, new, fresh in expression, convincing in tragic situations, energetic above her lifetime experience."

Her breakthrough film role was as Zorica in the Serbian dark comedy Crna Zorica. The role earned her and Branislav Trifunović a nomination for Her and Him award for the Best Acting Duo of the Year at the 2012 Film Meetings festival in Niš, Serbia, while the award was eventually won by Sloboda Mićalović and Ivan Bosiljčić. Penov was a special guest at the 2015 Hoboken International Film Festival, where she was selected as one of the aspiring talents and because of her outstanding performance in the film Crna Zorica (Loveless Zoritsa). At the Festival she was handed two awards for the film Loveless Zoritsa: Best Feature Film and Best of the Festival - Jury Award that was handed especially to her because of her contribution (as an actress) to the film Loveless Zoritsa.

She played and plays in numerous theaters such as Yugoslav Drama Theatre Belgrade, National Theatre Belgrade, SKC Belgrade, National Theatre in Subotica, Serbian National Theatre in Novi Sad, Istrian National Theatre (Pula, Croatia), Cankar Hall, (Slovenia, Ljubljana).

Among other numerous film roles to wider audience she is known for her parts in “Honeymoons”, "Crna Zorica" - “Loveless Zoritsa”, Zlatna levica, priča o Radivoju Koraću" (“Zucko – the story of Radivoj Korac""), and others.

== Personal life ==
She is engaged in humanitarian work with several organizations in Belgrade, and was recognized for her efforts in the City Assembly of Belgrade in November 2015.
