= Ghetto Angels =

2019 single by NoCap

Single by NoCap

from the album The Backend Child
- Released: May 17, 2019
- Length: 3:55
- Songwriters: Kobe Crawford Jr.; Brandon Casey; Brian Casey; Julius McCormack; Melvin Coleman
- Producer: Juse Dayne

NoCap singles chronology
"Upset" (2019)	"Ghetto Angels" (2019)	"Blind Nights" (2019)

Music video
- "Ghetto Angels" on YouTube

"Ghetto Angels" is a song by American rapper NoCap. Considered his breakout hit, it was officially released on May 17, 2019, as the lead single from his mixtape The Backend Child (2019), after its music video premiered on March 24, 2019. The song was produced by Juse Dayne.

== Background ==
In an interview with Genius, NoCap provided some background information about the song:

I was in LA, and I had already made like 2, 3 songs. But it was the last song for the night. So everybody asleep, really. But I heard the beat, I think, my manager Ada brought me a beat. I'm like, "Yeah that's the one right there." So I just went out feelin' at the time, crazy part about that, I said "long live Lo" in the beginning of the song when I did the video. But when I made the song he wasn’t even dead yet. I went live after I made the song, he coming up under there like this hard, this hard. He passed away before the even song dropped, video dropped. He was already gone. But he heard the song though, it was one of his favorites. Next thing I know he dead. So I really just dedicated the song to him. Even though like I made it before he died. but I still shot a little scene at his candlelight vigil and stuff like that.

NoCap stated he came up with the title as soon as he finished the song.

== Composition ==
The song contains a piano-driven instrumental, over which NoCap performs in a style combining singing and rapping voices. Lyrically, he reflecting on losing friends and family in the streets, depicting them as watching over him. He also references his reliance on drugs to cope with his pain.

== Critical reception ==
Pitchfork included the song in their list "The Best Rap Songs of 2019".

== Music video ==
The music video begins with NoCap and his crew singing an a cappella version of the song, "like a gun-wielding hood choir".

== Remix ==
An official remix of the song was released on September 30, 2019. It features American rapper Lil Durk and American R&B group Jagged Edge. The former references the many killings in the streets of Chicago, including that of his cousin.

== Certifications ==
Region	Certification	Certified units/sales
United States (RIAA)	Platinum	1,000,000^{‡}
^{‡} Sales+streaming figures based on certification alone.
