= Steel Human =

Mixtape by NoCap
- Released: July 16, 2020
- Genre: Hip hop
- Length: 46:34
- Labels: Atlantic; Never Broke Again
- Producers: Al Geno; Audio Jacc; Bass Charity; Benjamin Lasnier; Cash Flow; CashMoneyAP; G5; Greg Sekeres; Jambo; Lang On Lead; LastHaze; LayZ Beats; LenoxBeatmaker; LNK; LukasBL; Mook On The Beats; ProdByKel; StringzOnTheBeat; VenoTheBuilder; XTT; Young Grind; youngkimj; Yung Lan; Yung Tago

NoCap chronology
The Hood Dictionary (2019)	Steel Human (2020)	Mr. Crawford (2022)

Singles from Steel Human
- 1. "Count a Million" Released: June 16, 2020

Professional ratings
Review scores
Source	Rating
AllMusic	4/5 stars
HotNewHipHop	VERY HOTTTTT

Steel Human is the fifth mixtape by American rapper NoCap. It was released on July 16, 2020, by Atlantic Records and Never Broke Again. It features guest appearances from DaBaby, Boosie Badazz, Lil Uzi Vert, and Jacquees. It is the follow-up to his first two solo releases, The Backend Child (2019) and The Hood Dictionary (2019), as well as the collaboration mixtape Rogerville (2019) with fellow rapper Rylo Rodriguez. The project debuted at number 31 on the US Billboard 200.

== Promotion ==
=== Singles ===
The one and only lead single, "Count a Million" featuring American rapper Lil Uzi Vert, was released on June 16, 2020.

=== Music videos ===
The music video for the song "By Tonight", was released on June 22, 2020. The music video for the song "Radar", premiered on July 22, 2020. The music video for the song "Overtime", was released on September 15, 2020.

== Commercial performance ==
On July 27, 2020, Steel Human debuted at number 31 on the US Billboard 200, NoCap's third entry on the chart. The project also debuted at number 18 on the US Top R&B/Hip-Hop Albums chart and number 17 on the US Top Rap Albums chart.

== Track listing ==
Credits adapted from Genius, Spotify, and Tidal.

No.	Title	Writer(s)	Producer(s)	Length
1.	"Steel Human"	Kobe Crawford; Ceary Houston	VenoTheBuilder	1:49
2.	"Overtime"	Crawford; Gene Hixon; Dean Hall; Milan Modi; Malita Rice	Al Geno; StringzOnTheBeat; Yung Lan	3:45
3.	"Instagram Models"	Crawford; Hixon; Benjamin Lasnier; Lukas Leth	Al Geno; Lasnier; LukasBL	3:13
4.	"Rich Criminals" (featuring DaBaby)	Crawford; Hixon; Jonathan Kirk	Al Geno	3:03
5.	"Radar"	Crawford; Hixon; Nicolas Berlinger; Sebastien Jasinski	Al Geno; Young Grind^{[a]}; LenoxBeatmaker^{[b]}	2:35
6.	"Gangsta Cryin" (featuring Boosie Badazz)	Crawford; Hixon; Torrence Hatch, Jr.	Al Geno	3:48
7.	"By Tonight"	Crawford; Alex Petit; Benjamin Hubble	CashMoneyAP; LayZ Beats^{[a]}	3:20
8.	"Count A Million" (featuring Lil Uzi Vert)	Crawford; Hixon; Aaron Tago; Symere Woods	Al Geno; Yung Tago	3:36
9.	"Wait Your Turn"	Crawford; Ruben Wardlaw; Greg Sekeres	G5; Sekeres	2:27
10.	"Jail Time"	Crawford; Hixon; Jaehyun Kim	Al Geno; XTT^{[a]}; youngkimj^{[a]}	2:25
11.	"Spinal Chords" (featuring Jacquees)	Crawford; David Stewart; Kelton Morgan	Lang On Lead; ProdByKel	3:06
12.	"Moose Sayin"	Crawford; Wardlaw; Brayon Nelson	Cash Flow; Mook On The Beats; G5	1:49
13.	"Lean On Me"	Crawford; Petit; Hubble	CashMoneyAP; LayZ Beats^{[a]}	3:01
14.	"Ghana"	Crawford; Kim	youngkimj	3:03
15.	"Surgery"	Crawford; Jorge Augusto; Cesar Amercio; Luzian Tuetsch; Harissis Tsakmaklis; Raúl Bermejo	Bass Charity; Jambo	2:40
16.	"Golden Tears"	Crawford; LastHaze; Leon Krol; Jack Mungan	LastHaze; LNK; Audio Jacc	2:54
Total length:				46:34

Notes

- ^{^[a]} signifies a co-producer
- ^{^[b]} signifies an additional producer

== Personnel ==
Credits adapted from Genius and Tidal.

Vocals

- NoCap – primary artist (all tracks)
- DaBaby – featured artist (track 4)
- Boosie Badazz – featured artist (track 6)
- Lil Uzi Vert – featured artist (track 8)
- Jacquees – featured artist (track 11)

Production

- VenoTheBuilder – producer (track 1)
- Al Geno – producer (tracks 2–6, 8, 10)
- StringzOnTheBeat – producer (track 2)
- Yung Lan – producer (track 2)
- Benjamin Lasnier – producer (track 3)
- LukasBL – producer (track 3)
- Young Grind – co-producer (track 5)
- LenoxBeatmaker – additional producer (track 5)
- CashMoneyAP – producer (tracks 7, 13)
- LayZ Beats – co-producer (track 7, 13)
- Yung Tago – producer (track 8)
- G5 – producer (tracks 9, 12)
- Greg Sekeres – producer (track 9)
- XTT – producer (track 10)
- youngkimj – producer (track 10, 14)
- Lang On Lead – producer (track 11)
- ProdByKel – producer (track 11)
- Cash Flow – producer (track 12)
- Mook On The Beats – producer (track 12)
- Bass Charity – producer (track 15)
- Jambo – producer (track 15)
- LastHaze – producer (track 16)
- LMK – producer (track 16)
- Audio Jacc – producer (track 16)

Technical

- Al Geno – mixer (tracks 1–3, 5, 7, 9–16)
- Chris Athens – masterer (all track)
- Dan Weston – mixer (tracks 4, 6, 8)

Programming

- VenoTheBuilder – programmer (track 1)
- Al Geno – programmer (tracks 2–6, 8, 10)
- StringzOnTheBeat – programmer (track 2)
- Yung Lan – programmer (track 2)
- Benjamin Lasnier – programmer (track 3)
- LukasBL – programmer (track 3)
- Young Grind – programmer (track 5)
- LenoxBeatmaker – programmer (track 5)
- CashMoneyAP – programmer (tracks 7, 13)
- LayZ Beats – programmer (track 7, 13)
- Yung Tago – programmer (track 8)
- G5 – programmer (tracks 9, 12)
- Greg Sekeres – programmer (track 9)
- XTT – programmer (track 10)
- youngkimj – programmer (track 10, 14)
- Lang On Lead – programmer (track 11)
- ProdByKel – programmer (track 11)
- Cash Flow – programmer (track 12)
- Mook On The Beats – programmer (track 12)
- Bass Charity – programmer (track 15)
- Jambo – programmer (track 15)
- LastHaze – programmer (track 16)
- LMK – programmer (track 16)
- Audio Jacc – programmer (track 16)

== Charts ==
Chart performance for Steel Human
Chart (2020)	Peak position
US Billboard 200	31
US Top R&B/Hip-Hop Albums (Billboard)	18
US Top Rap Albums (Billboard)	17
