= El Conquistadors =

Studio album by dreDDup
- Released: 2009
- Recorded: 2008
- Genre: Industrial
- Length: 75:02
- Label: Beast of Prey
- Producer: miKKa

DreDDup chronology
Future Porn Machine (2007)	El Conquistadors (2009)

Professional ratings
Review scores
Source	Rating
Terapija	(not rated)

El Conquistadors is the third official album of Serbian industrial group dreDDup. It was first released in 2009 for the Belgrade record label Insurrection Records. This was the third album that had a complete story behind it. Like the first and second release talked about the past and the future (Mr Borndeads Feast and Future Porn Machine), this album experimented with the dark present tense of mankind. Taking us to the boundaries of the human being and the terrorizing truth that lurks in the shadow of hostile environment all around. The title is purposely misspelled. The artwork was created entirely by the artist Danica Bicanic, and it presented the visual art of dreDDup music. This album also concluded some guest musicians such as DJ Shark Zowie & Briggite. The complete production and studio mastering and mixing was done by miKKa. Album was digitally remastered and re-released for Beast of Prey Records from Poland in May 2010.

here is the album manifest taken from dreDDup website:

"Get ready for blood, tears and sperm. This album talks about the present tense and the mankind, the boundaries of ones desires, dreams and mistakes. This is our statement to this rusted world, to these wasted dreams and plastic reality with real life and unreal people. We're sick of mediocrity in their bodies who walk empty streets without any real purpose. This album talks about them, about their sorrow, mistakes and inner demons. Without them we do not exist and without us they are nothing. This is about something real. It's about this fallen mankind. This world has become occupied, surrounded and unhealthy. We do not agree with this worlds systems of values. This is world without values, without inner boundaries that confront served mediocrity. We're so fucking sick of it all, and want to live in some better place, and really feel our childhood energy. So we named our album 'El Conquistadors' (proper Spanish title would be 'El Conquistador') but we want for those smart-ass motherfucking self-masturbating people to say that we're wrong, to say that they know better and to hear from their empty minds what do we need to do to live happy mediocrity life. And we're not even going to ask you to listen to this album, no - if you see it just run away from it, hate it, laugh at it, be the one of El Conquistadors who crush worlds without trying to feel them. Be the other one inside you, get stupid, lazy and un-civilized. But be warned - it will be too late to come to your senses in the end....."

== Track listing ==
1. Clockwork – 4:30
2. First Blood – 5:07
3. With No Teeth – 5:09
4. Opening – 5:50
5. Space Error – 4:00
6. Invisible Tears – 5:01
7. Mind Games – 4:02
8. Last One – 4:05
9. The New Pain – 4:43
10. El Conquistadors – 6:32
11. Futurism (mrbd mix) – 5:55
12. Oregon – 5:56
13. Return of the TV – 2:43
14. One of Us – 5:15
15. Amputated Soul – 6:24

== Personnel ==
- Mihajlo Obrenov; miKKa – lead vocals, electronics
- Ivan Francuski – drums
- Bojan Radakovic – lead guitar
- Nemanja Batalo – bass
- Karolj Burai – violin
- Jovan Matic – back vocals
- Danica Bicanic – back vocals

=== Production ===
- Nikola Pavlicevic – producers
- miKKa; miKKa – engineer
- miKKa; miKKa – remastering

== Sources ==
- http://beastofprey.com/lab_A_wy_bop71.htm
- http://www.terapija.net/mjuzik.asp?ID=6307
- http://www.tvorac-grada.com/hczin/Broj83/rcz.html
