= R.A.D.A.R.: The Adventures of the Bionic Dog =

- Directed by: Scott Vandiver
- Written by: Dean Cain; April Smallwood; Scott Vandiver; Tony Armer; Ricky Wayne; Christian Cashmir; Marty Poole
- Produced by: Tony Armer
- Release date: June 27, 2023
- Running time: 88 minutes
- Country: United States
- Language: English
- Box office: $25,556

R.A.D.A.R.: The Adventures of the Bionic Dog is a 2023 American family adventure film directed by Scott Vandiver and written by a team including Dean Cain and April Smallwood. The film stars Dean Cain alongside Ezra James Lerario, Caroline Elle Abrams, and Vincent De Paul. It follows a boy who discovers a dog with bionic abilities and teams up with him to save his town. The film was released in the United States on June 27, 2023.

== Plot ==
In a small rural town, young James struggles to fit in at school and dreams of adventure. One day, he stumbles upon a stray dog injured in the woods. With the help of his grandfather, James learns the dog—whom he names R.A.D.A.R. (short for "Robotic Animal Developed for Advanced Rescue")—has been fitted with experimental bionic technology that gives him super-speed, strength, and advanced communication skills.

When two bumbling crooks hatch a plan to rob local businesses, James and R.A.D.A.R. join forces to stop them. With the dog's enhanced abilities, the duo foil several schemes, protect townsfolk, and ultimately expose the criminals’ plot. Along the way, James gains confidence, learns the value of friendship, and discovers that even small heroes can make a big difference.

== Cast ==
- Dean Cain as Grandpa Bill
- Ezra James Lerario as James
- Caroline Abrams as Emma
- Vincent De Paul as Mayor Thomas
- Ricky Wayne as Carl
- Andrew Key as Hank
- Paul Wilson as Sheriff Collins

== Production ==
The film was developed through Litewave Media and Fairway Film Alliance, with writer–producer Dean Cain contributing to the script. Shooting took place in Florida in 2021 and 2022, with local cast and crew members involved.

== Release ==
The film had a limited theatrical release in the United States on June 27, 2023, distributed by Fairway Film Alliance. It was later made available on video-on-demand and streaming platforms.

== Reception ==
A review in Commonsense media described it as a "lightweight but family-friendly adventure" and concluded, regarding the potential message of the film: "Although the positive examples of teamwork, ingenuity, and persistence are present, the takeaways might not be obvious for younger viewers to spot." The scenic presence of Tampa Bay landscape was underlined in the Tampa Bay Times.

Local Florida press covered the film’s regional premiere, highlighting its community-driven production and family-oriented storytelling.
