= MiKKa =

miKKa
- Born: Mihajlo Obrenov
- Origin: Novi Sad, Serbia
- Genres: Industrial Rock, Crossover, Punk, Electronica, Industrial, Hardcore, Experimental music
- Instruments: Vocals, guitar, bass guitar, drums
- Years active: 1996–present

Mihajlo Obrenov a.k.a. miKKa (born 1982) is a Serbian musician, sound engineer and film director. His main work consists of experimentation with sound and exploration of weird ambient noises.

== with dreDDup ==
- 1997 - The Hot Stuff MixTape
- 1998 - Total Noise [ep]
- 1998 - Roots of Them [ep]
- 1998 - Digital Punk Years (When We Were Teens) [ep]
- 1998 - Anormal Waltz
- 1999 - Dredd and Buried [ep]
- 1999 - Zog Tag
- 1999 - Rave Years [ep]
- 1999 - Two One Nine 1997-1999 [ep]
- 2000 - Rocket to USA [ep]
- 2001 - Transfusion 219 [ep]
- 2001 - Problematic Memories [ep]
- 2002 - R U Digital!? [demo album]
- 2002 - 219_demos 1997-2002
- 2003 - Mirror Mirror [ep]
- 2003 - Rewind [ep]
- 2004 - Mr. Borndeads Feast
- 2007 - Future Porn Machine
- 2008 - The Great Industrial Comeback (with Figurative Theatre)
- 2009 - EI Conquistadors
- 2009 - Meratopolitek [ep]
- 2011 - dreDDup
- 2011 - Alive From the Other Side
- 2012 - Nautilus
- 2014 - I Dreamt of a Dragon
- 2016 - DeathOven (Rebels Have No Kings)
- 2016 - doTM [ep]
- 2016 - Disturbia [ep]
- 2018 - Soyuz
- 2019 - 219
- 2021 - Romance of Romans
- 2024 - Pan/Dora
- 2024 - Raw Sound Revolt [ep]

== with MRT ==
- 2008 - Nightmare [ep]
- 2008 - Love After Eath
- 2009 - Friends
- 2010 - Mrt & Stežica: Live in space
- 2010 - 3
- 2011 - inTERRiOR
- 2012 - exTERRiOR
- 2015 - Grnda
- 2015 - Cyclopa
- 2017 - Sneep
- 2022 - Fiftn
- 2024 - Kerrang

== with CUtNpasTe ==
- 2004 - Suck it, it's still Hot
- 2008 - Resurrection [ep]
- 2011 - Kill 'em All and Come Back Alone

== with Prozor ==
- 2003 - U tihoj noći sa crvćcima
- 2003 - Prozor
- 2003 - Treći
- 2004 - Komšija, ostavi te mrtve kosture
- 2004 - Surovi propeler i dete kreten

== with Mefisto ==
- 1999 - Demo
- 2002 - Bili smo ponosni ratnici

== with ZANAos ==
- 2009 - KKK

== with Lignjoslav ==
- 2005 - Lignjoslav
- 2005 - Pankeri sa ulice
- 2005 - Ovaj put bez lepka
- 2005 - Kako se zove?
- 2005 - Ko preživi flašista ili kako sam bio LSD
- 2006 - Bato, ti si najlepši lik u porodilištu
- 2007 - Lignjoslav protiv Emoslava
- 2007 - Pozdravi iz klonje 8
- 2007 - Spontano izdrkaj

== with Celulita ==
- 2008 - No One's Son

== with Smetno ==
- 2005 - Smetno

== with Moki LLok ==
- 1999 - Moki Llok

== with Klef ==
- 1998 - Back to Life

== with Mind Control ==
- 1997 - Shock demo

== with Ressurected ==
- 1996 - Escape From Novi Sad

== film music ==
- 2002 - Samuraj bez duše
- 2004 - Alisa u zemlji čuda (theater play)
- 2010 - Araneum
- 2015 - Radar - Auschwitz Jugoslovensko Sećanje
- 2016 - Enkel
- 2022 - Do daske
- 2023 - Mamula All Inclusive
- 2024 - Novi Sad Remembrance

== with other projects ==
- 1999 - Vladimir Petrović "Vlada sesija" (as guitarist)
- 2011 - Kleimor 'Spectrum' (as a vocal)
- 2012 - Ass2Ass (as synth player)
- 2012 - Khargash "The Defiance Mephisto" (as a guest vocal)
- 2014 - Microwaved "My Personal Judas" (as a vocalist)

== as a producer ==
- 1999 - Vladimir Petrovic - "Vlada sesija"
- 2001 - Face It - "First demo"
- 2001 - 3D Rošava Pipe - "Demo"
- 2002 - 3D Rošava Pipe - "3D Rošava Pipe"
- 2004 - Drop Dead - "Senseless"
- 2004 - Bunar - "Original soundtrack"
- 2005 - Trulo Do Beswesti - "demo"
- 2005 - 3D Rošava Pipe - "Masan kolac side"
- 2005 - Paragos - "1984"
- 2006 - Stand Your Ground
- 2008 - Tribute to Razlog Za "Dolje u tišini" cover
- 2008 - Underneath It All - Nine Inch Nails "Piggy" cover
- 2009 - Our Idea of Fun - The Stooges "1969" cover
- 2009 - Blago gluvima: a Tribute to Patareni "Debilana" cover
- 2009 - Dark Tribute to Lepa Brena "Hajde da sevolimo" cover
- 2011 - f.O.F - "Discipline"
- 2012 - Requiem Pour Les Medef - "L'Idéologie Du Choix" cover
- 2013 - Crna Barbi - "Church of Pain"
- 2016 - Tamerlan - "Luciferian"
- 2017 - CPR - "Bože pravde"
- 2017 - War Engine - "The Verdict"
- 2018 - Odvojena Stvarnost - "Odvojena Stvarnost"
- 2019 - Tamerlan - "Infinigrammaton"
- 2019 - Odvojena Stvarnost - "Dosta" [ep]
- 2020 - Get of the Throne - drum recording
- 2023 - Planete Magnifiee - A Tribute to Failure "Distorted Fields" cover

== Filmography ==
- 1997 - dreDDup "Step In, Step Out" (music video)
- 1997 - dreDDup "Generation Devastation" (music video)
- 1998 - dreDDup "Found Myself In Veins of a Virgin" (music video)
- 1998 - dreDDup "Help" (music video)
- 1998 - dreDDup "No Hands Man" (music video)
- 1998 - dreDDup "Rusty Nails" (music video)
- 1999 - dreDDup "CD Burner" (music video)
- 2000 - dreDDup "Mocky llock" (music video)
- 2001 - dreDDup "Power Up the Horse" (music video)
- 2001 - dreDDup "Sweet sixteen" (music video)
- 2002 - dreDDup "Problematic Memories" (music video)
- 2002 - dreDDup "Paper Cutz" (music video)
- 2002 - dreDDup "3010" (music video)
- 2002 - dreDDup "Got 2 Got 2 Get" (music video)
- 2002 - dreDDup "FIN" (music video)
- 2003 - Bunar : Ufo biblioteka (short movie)
- 2003 - dreDDup "3010 (ver.2)" (music video)
- 2003 - Pauza (short movie)
- 2003 - Susret (short movie)
- 2004 - Prozor "Nadrkani peškir" (music video)
- 2004 - Bunar : Mrtvi ne nose tange (short movie)
- 2004 - dreDDup "Your World" (music video)
- 2004 - Prozor "Tepiha mi" (music video)
- 2005 - Lignjoslav "Trauma" (music video)
- 2005 - Bunar : Vanja čovek napast (short movie)
- 2005 - Lignjoslav "Tajni drot" (music video)
- 2005 - dreDDup "Mr Borndead" (music video)
- 2005 - Život uspavanih sećanja (movie)
- 2005 - Lignjoslav "Moja pašteta" (music video)
- 2006 - dreDDup "Plastica" (music video)
- 2006 - dreDDup "Redeemer" (music video)
- 2006 - Building (short movie)
- 2006 - dreDDup "Haeekoo" (music video)
- 2006 - Beer Hunter (documentary)
- 2006 - Lignjoslav "Raspala se država" (music video)
- 2006 - Lignjoslav "Himna pivu" (music video)
- 2007 - ZANAos "Gde si ti" (music video)
- 2007 - dreDDup "When You Know That It's All Wrong" (music video)
- 2007 - Lignjoslav "Pozerka" (music video)
- 2007 - ZANAos "KKK" (music video)
- 2007 - MRT "Joca's Wet Dream" (music video)
- 2007 - ZANAos "KerBa" (music video)
- 2007 - Lignjoslav "Furbo Tolk" (music video)
- 2007 - Lignjoslav "Žirafa i slon" (music video)
- 2007 - Upoznaj moj dan (documentary)
- 2007 - dreDDup "Inside Out" (music video)
- 2007 - Lignjoslav "Pijana bulja" (music video)
- 2007 - Heart in junk (short movie)
- 2008 - dreDDup "No More Fingers" (music video)
- 2008 - MRT : Apocalypse (documentary)
- 2008 - Samhain (commercial)
- 2008 - dreDDup "Return of the TV" (music video)
- 2008 - Bunar : Krvava dijeta (short movie)
- 2008 - Industrial Renaissance (documentary)
- 2009 - dreDDup "Oregon" (music video)
- 2009 - Treća Debela Sas Slike "Odbegao eksperiment" (music video)
- 2009 - dreDDup "Last One" (music video)
- 2009 - dreDDup "Invisible Tears" (music video)
- 2009 - Bunar : Pica ubica (2009)
- 2010 - Samhain 2010 (commercial)
- 2010 - dreDDup "Orbit" (music video)
- 2010 - Araneum (movie)
- 2010 - Ivan Čkonjević "Lokomotive nose tvoje ime" (music video)
- 2010 - dreDDup "God of FM Stereo" (music video)
- 2010 - dreDDup "Stop Rew Play" (music video)
- 2011 - Tona "Atreid" (music video)
- 2011 - dreDDup "Footfalls" (music video)
- 2011 - dreDDup "When Dead Come Home" (music video)
- 2011 - MRT "Within" (music video)
- 2011 - dreDDup "Machine" (music video)
- 2011 - dreDDup "People Are Dead" (music video)
- 2011 - dreDDup "Garden of Dead Friends" (music video)
- 2012 - dreDDup "Cold Eyes" (music video)
- 2012 - MRT "Zipper" (music video)
- 2012 - Mad & Goya "Divizija piva" (music video)
- 2012 - dreDDup "Two of Us" (music video)
- 2012 - Treći talas (commercial)
- 2013 - Satan Panonski "Iza zida" (music video)
- 2013 - dreDDup "Fire Up the Planet" (music video)
- 2014 - Concrete Sun "The Galley" (music video)
- 2014 - Proleće "SO" (music video)
- 2014 - Novi Sad Biciklograd (short documentary)
- 2014 - dreDDup "TamTamTam" (music video)
- 2014 - TLO Fest 2014 (concert video)
- 2014 - Franja Kluz "ButtSeeRoad" (music video)
- 2014 - Scena Fest 4 (commercial)
- 2014 - dreDDup "Pussy Control Panel" (music video)
- 2015 - Metak U MetaK "DB Ništarija" (music video)
- 2015 - Neprijatelj prelazi zeku "Pseto" (music video)
- 2015 - Krug napravi, vazduh popravi (short documentary)
- 2015 - TLO Fest 2015 (concert video)
- 2015 - dreDDup "Marquis de Novi Sad" (music video)
- 2016 - Northern Revival "Over the Edge Life Consumer" (music video)
- 2016 - dreDDup "Disco-Taken" (music video)
- 2016 - Proleće "Bezobrazluk" (music video)
- 2016 - dreDDup & SubFrom "Rage Disease Desire" (music video)
- 2016 - Northern Revival "Heavy Deliver Man" (music video)
- 2016 - Northern Revival "Life consumer" (music video)
- 2017 - dreDDup "Venom" (music video)
- 2017 - dreDDup "Zelia" (music video)
- 2017 - MRT "Traumm" (music video)
- 2017 - Kontakt (documentary)
- 2018 - dreDDup "ReMorse Code" (music video)
- 2018 - dreDDup "The Last Dance" (music video)
- 2018 - dreDDup "Ctrl Alt Death" (music video)
- 2019 - Odvojena Stvarnost "Dosta" (music video)
- 2019 - Northern Revival "Old Sparky" (music video)
- 2019 - Downstroy "Don't Hide Away" (music video)
- 2019 - Northern Revival "Mr. Rabbit" (music video)
- 2019 - dreDDup "Designed to Die" (music video)
- 2020 - dreDDup "Dark Street Boys" (music video)
- 2020 - MRT "Botty Fal" (music video)
- 2020 - dreDDup "Wounded By Sound" (music video)
- 2020 - MRT "Zub AR" (music video)
- 2021 - dreDDup "The Rolling Sotones" (music video)
- 2021 - Terrible First Impression "Shitstains" (music video)
- 2021 - dreDDup "All Wives Matter" (music video)
- 2021 - Fight Club "Pobednik" (commercial)
- 2021 - dreDDup "Sgt.Salt" (music video)
- 2021 - dreDDup "Romance of Romans" (music video)
- 2022 - dreDDup "Etika" (music video)
- 2022 - dreDDup "We Sperm Noise" (music video)
- 2022 - Lost & Found (podcast series)
- 2022 - dreDDup "Zero Tolerance" (music video)
- 2022 - dreDDup "Mr. Fooz" (music video)
- 2022 - dreDDup "Lust Supper" (music video)
- 2022 - Noise Gate "Doer" (music video)
- 2022 - dreDDup "Margot's Not Dead Yet" (music video)
- 2022 - Northern Revival "Psychosis" (music video)
- 2022 - dreDDup "Futurism" (music video)
- 2022 - dreDDup "Roots of Them" (music video)
- 2023 - Khargash "Daimonic" (music video)
- 2023 - dreDDup "Plastica" (music video)
- 2023 - Lust 4 Thrust "Ja sam tvoj bog" (music video)
- 2023 - dreDDup "Clark Can't" (music video)
- 2023 - Offscore at Metaldays 2023 (documentary)
- 2023 - dreDDup "Cherry Noble" (music video)
- 2023 - Inside Out "Your Supports" (music video)
- 2024 - dreDDup "Not From Here" (music video)
- 2024 - dreDDup "Angel for the Masses" (music video)
- 2024 - Khargash "Frequency" (music video)
- 2024 - Offscore at Italy 2024 (documentary)
- 2025 - Subotići (documentary)
- 2025 - Greenbirds "Gradska oluja" (music video)
- 2025 - Bibliotekari predstavljaju (series)
- 2026 - Mefisto "Korov" (music video)
- 2026 - Trag (documentary)

== As a radio show host ==
- 2009-2011 Total War
- 2011-2012 C:S TV RadioShow
- 2019-2022 Alternoon

== See also ==
- Music of Serbia
- Electronic rock
- dreDDup
