= List of awards and nominations received by Megan Thee Stallion =

Megan Thee Stallion awards and nominations
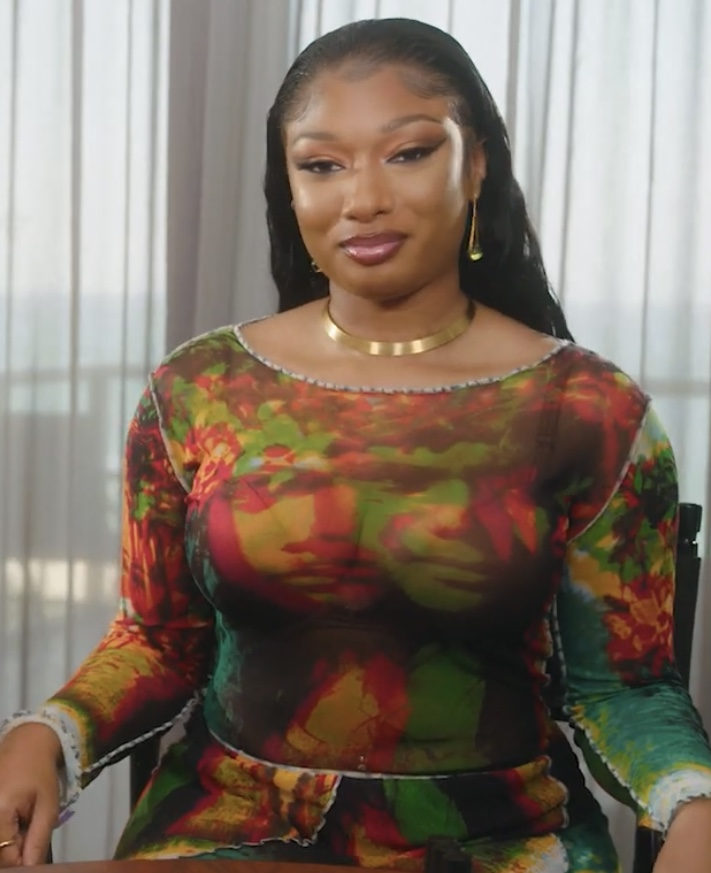
- Megan Thee Stallion in 2021
Awards and nominations
Award	Wins	Nominations
American Music Awards	5	8
Apple Music Awards	1	1
BET Awards	7	21
BET Hip Hop Awards	8	38
Billboard Music Awards	2	9
Billboard Women in Music	1	1
BMI Awards	4	4
Bravo Otto	0	1
Grammy Awards	3	6
iHeartRadio Music Awards	1	9
Joox Thailand Music Awards	0	1
MTV Europe Music Awards	0	7
MTV Millennial Awards Brazil	0	2
MTV Video Music Awards	4	13
Music Awards Japan	1	5
NAACP Image Awards	2	5
Nickelodeon Kids' Choice Awards	1	2
NME Awards	0	1
People's Choice Awards	1	6
Premios Lo Nuestro	0	1
Rockbjörnen	0	1
Soul Train Music Awards	1	3
Variety's Hitmakers	1	1
Libera Awards	1	3
UK Music Video Awards	1	3

Totals (Note: Certain award groups do not simply award one winner. They acknowledge several different recipients, have runners-up, and have third place. Since this is a specific recognition and is different from losing an award, runner-up mentions are considered wins in this award tally. For simplification and to avoid errors, each award in this list has been presumed to have had a prior nomination.)
- Wins: 57
- Nominations: 190

American rapper and songwriter Megan Thee Stallion has received various accolades throughout her career. She is winner of three Grammy Awards, two Billboard Music Awards, six BET Awards, five BET Hip Hop Awards and four MTV Video Music Awards.

She rose to prominence in 2019 with her mixtape Fever, which won the award for Best Mixtape at the 2019 BET Hip Hop Awards, and was later nominated for Album of the Year at the 2020 BET Awards. Her singles "Cash Shit" and "Hot Girl Summer" garnered her several nominations, with the former nominated at the 2019 Soul Train Music Awards and the 2020 NME Awards, and the latter earning her an MTV Video Music Award.

In 2020 she was featured on Cardi B's song "WAP", winning at the American Music Awards, three BET Hip Hop Awards and two BET Awards. In 2021, she won the Grammy Award for Best New Artist and received three nominations for "Savage (Remix)" with Beyoncé, winning Best Rap Song and Best Rap Performance, become the first all-female collaboration to win in the last category in Grammy history.

Megan Thee Stallion was nominated for Best Female Hip-Hop Artist at the BET Awards in both 2019 and 2020, winning the latter. She additionally has been nominated for Best New Hip Hop Artist at the 2019 BET Hip Hop Awards, Top Rap Female Artist at the 2020 Billboard Music Awards, Best New Hip-Hop Artist at the 2020 iHeartRadio Music Awards and Artist of the Year at the 2020 MTV Video Music Awards. She has also received the Marketing Genius award at the 2020 Libera Awards and the Powerhouse Award at the 2019 Billboard Women in Music awards.

== Awards and nominations ==
Award	Year (Note: Indicates the year of ceremony. Each year is linked to the article about the awards held that year, wherever possible.)	Recipient or nominee	Category	Result	Ref.
American Music Awards	2020	Herself	New Artist of the Year	Nominated	
American Music Awards	2020	Herself	Favorite Hip-Hop/Rap Female Artist	Nominated	
American Music Awards	2020	"WAP" (with Cardi B)	Favorite Song - Rap/Hip-Hop	Won	
American Music Awards	2020	"WAP" (with Cardi B)	Collaboration of the Year	Nominated	
American Music Awards	2020	"Savage" (Beyoncé remix)	Collaboration of the Year	Nominated	
American Music Awards	2021	Herself	Favorite Hip-Hop/Rap Female Artist	Won	
American Music Awards	2021	"Body"	Favorite Trending Song	Won	
American Music Awards	2021	Good News	Favorite Hip-Hop/Rap Album	Won	
American Music Awards	2022	Herself	Favorite Female Hip-Hop Artist	Nominated	
American Music Awards	2025	Herself	Favorite Female Hip-Hop Artist	Won	
Apple Music Awards	2020	Herself	Breakthrough Artist of the Year	Won	
Berlin Commercial Awards	2021	"Thot Shit"	Best Music Video	Won	
Berlin Commercial Awards	2021	"Thot Shit"	Casting	Won	
Berlin Commercial Awards	2021	"Thot Shit"	Costume Styling	Won	
Berlin Music Video Awards	2021	"WAP" (with Cardi B)	Best Art Director	Nominated	
Berlin Music Video Awards	2022	"Sweetest Pie" (with Dua Lipa)	Best Editor	Nominated	
Berlin Music Video Awards	2022	"Thot Shit"	Best Art Director	Nominated	
Berlin Music Video Awards	2024	"Hiss"	Best Art Director	Nominated	
Berlin Music Video Awards	2025	"Boa"	Best Editor	Nominated	
BET Awards	2019	Herself	Best Female Hip-Hop Artist	Nominated	
BET Awards	2020	Herself	Best Female Hip-Hop Artist	Won	
BET Awards	2020	Fever	Album of the Year	Nominated	
BET Awards	2020	"Hot Girl Summer" (featuring Nicki Minaj & Ty Dolla Sign)	Video of the Year	Nominated	
BET Awards	2020	"Hot Girl Summer" (featuring Nicki Minaj & Ty Dolla Sign)	Coca-Cola Viewers' Choice Award	Won	
BET Awards	2020	"Hot Girl Summer" (featuring Nicki Minaj & Ty Dolla Sign)	Best Collaboration	Nominated	
BET Awards	2021	Good News	Album of the Year	Nominated	
BET Awards	2021	Herself	Best Female Hip-Hop Artist	Won	
BET Awards	2021	"Cry Baby" (featuring DaBaby)	Best Collaboration	Nominated	
BET Awards	2021	"WAP" (with Cardi B)	Best Collaboration	Won	
BET Awards	2021	"WAP" (with Cardi B)	Video of the Year	Won	
BET Awards	2021	"WAP" (with Cardi B)	Coca-Cola Viewers' Choice Award	Nominated	
BET Awards	2021	"Savage" (Beyoncé remix)	Coca-Cola Viewers' Choice Award	Won	
BET Awards	2022	Herself	Best Female Hip Hop Artist	Won	
BET Awards	2023	Herself	Best Female Hip Hop Artist	Nominated	
BET Awards	2023	"Her"	BET Her Award	Nominated	
BET Awards	2024	Best Female Hip Hop Artist	Herself	Nominated	
BET Awards	2024	"Bongos" (with Cardi B)	Best Collaboration	Nominated	
BET Awards	2024	"Bongos" (with Cardi B)	Video of the Year	Nominated	
BET Awards	2024	"Hiss"	BET Her Award	Nominated	
BET Awards	2025	Herself	Best Female Hip Hop Artist	Nominated	
BET Awards	2026	Herself	Best Female Hip Hop Artist	Nominated	
BET Hip Hop Awards	2019	Fever	Best Mixtape	Won	
BET Hip Hop Awards	2019	Herself	MVP of the Year	Nominated	
BET Hip Hop Awards	2019	Herself	Hot Ticket Performer	Won	
BET Hip Hop Awards	2019	Herself	Best New Hip Hop Artist	Nominated	
BET Hip Hop Awards	2020	Herself	Artist of the Year	Won	
BET Hip Hop Awards	2020	Herself	Lyricist of the Year	Nominated	
BET Hip Hop Awards	2020	Herself	Hustler of the Year	Won	
BET Hip Hop Awards	2020	Herself	Best Live Performer	Nominated	
BET Hip Hop Awards	2020	"Savage" (Beyoncé remix)	Song of the Year	Nominated	
BET Hip Hop Awards	2020	"Savage" (Beyoncé remix)	Best Collaboration	Won	
BET Hip Hop Awards	2020	"Hot Girl Summer" (featuring Nicki Minaj & Ty Dolla Sign)	Best Collaboration	Nominated	
BET Hip Hop Awards	2020	Suga	Album of the Year	Nominated	
BET Hip Hop Awards	2021	Good News	Album of the Year	Nominated	
BET Hip Hop Awards	2021	"WAP" (with Cardi B)	Best Hip Hop Video	Won	
BET Hip Hop Awards	2021	"WAP" (with Cardi B)	Best collaboration	Won	
BET Hip Hop Awards	2021	"WAP" (with Cardi B)	Song of the Year	Won	
BET Hip Hop Awards	2021	Herself	Hip Hop Artist of the Year	Nominated	
BET Hip Hop Awards	2021	Herself	Best Live Performer	Nominated	
BET Hip Hop Awards	2021	Herself	Lyricist of the Year	Nominated	
BET Hip Hop Awards	2021	Herself	Hustler of the Year	Nominated	
BET Hip Hop Awards	2021	"On Me (Remix)" (with Lil Baby)	Sweet 16: Best Featured Verse	Nominated	
BET Hip Hop Awards	2022	Herself	Hip Hop Artist of the Year	Nominated	
BET Hip Hop Awards	2022	Herself	Hustler of the Year	Nominated	
BET Hip Hop Awards	2023	Traumazine	Album of the Year	Nominated	
BET Hip Hop Awards	2023	"Anxiety"	Impact Track	Nominated	
BET Hip Hop Awards	2023	Herself	Best Live Performance	Nominated	
BET Hip Hop Awards	2024	Megan	Hip Hop Album of the Year	Nominated	
BET Hip Hop Awards	2024	Herself	Hip Hop Artist of the Year	Nominated	
BET Hip Hop Awards	2024	Herself	Best Live Performer	Nominated	
BET Hip Hop Awards	2024	Herself	Lyricist of the Year	Nominated	
BET Hip Hop Awards	2024	Herself	Hustler of the Year	Nominated	
BET Hip Hop Awards	2024	"Bongos" (with Cardi B)	Best Collaboration	Nominated	
BET Hip Hop Awards	2024	"Wanna Be" (with GloRilla)	Best Collaboration	Nominated	
BET Hip Hop Awards	2024	"Mamushi" (featuring Yuki Chiba)	Best Collaboration	Nominated	
BET Hip Hop Awards	2024	"Mamushi" (featuring Yuki Chiba)	Song of the Year	Nominated	
BET Hip Hop Awards	2024	"Wanna Be"	Sweet 16: Best Featured Verse	Nominated	
BET Hip Hop Awards	2024	"Hiss"	Impact Track	Nominated	
BET Hip Hop Awards	2024	"Boa"	Best Hip Hop Video	Nominated	
Billboard Music Awards	2020	Herself	Top Rap Female Artist	Nominated	
Billboard Music Awards	2021	Herself	Top Song Sales Artist	Nominated	
Billboard Music Awards	2021	Herself	Top Rap Female Artist	Won	
Billboard Music Awards	2021	Herself	Top Female Artist	Nominated	
Billboard Music Awards	2021	"WAP" (with Cardi B)	Top Rap Song	Nominated	
Billboard Music Awards	2021	"WAP" (with Cardi B)	Top Streaming Song	Nominated	
Billboard Music Awards	2021	"WAP" (with Cardi B)	Top Selling Song	Nominated	
Billboard Music Awards	2021	"Savage"	Top Selling Song	Nominated	
Billboard Music Awards	2021	"Savage"	Top Rap Song	Nominated	
Billboard Music Awards	2022	Herself	Top Rap Female Artist	Won	
Billboard Women in Music	2019	Herself	Powerhouse Award	Won	
BMI Awards	2021	"Savage" (Beyoncé remix)	Award-Winning Songs	Won	
BMI Awards	2021	"Savage"	Award-Winning Songs	Won	
BMI Awards	2021	"Hot Girl Summer" (with Nicki Minaj & Ty Dolla Sign)	Award-Winning Songs	Won	
BMI Awards	2021	WAP (with Cardi B)	Award-Winning Songs	Won	
BMI London Awards	2021	"B.I.T.C.H"	Most Performed Song	Won	
Bravo Otto	2020	Herself	Hip-Hop International	Nominated	
Grammy Awards	2021	Herself	Best New Artist	Won	
Grammy Awards	2021	"Savage" (Beyoncé remix)	Record of the Year	Nominated	
Grammy Awards	2021	"Savage" (Beyoncé remix)	Best Rap Song	Won	
Grammy Awards	2021	"Savage" (Beyoncé remix)	Best Rap Performance	Won	
Grammy Awards	2022	"Thot Shit"	Best Rap Performance	Nominated	
Grammy Awards	2022	Montero (as a featured artist)	Album of the Year	Nominated	
Guinness World Records	2021	Herself	First Female Artist to win Best Rap Performance at 2021 Grammys	Won	
Guinness World Records	2021	Herself	First Female Lead Rapper to win Best Rap Song at 2021 Grammys	Won	
Glamour Awards	2021	Herself	Women of the Year	Won	
iHeartRadio Music Awards	2020	Herself	Best New Hip-Hop Artist	Nominated	
iHeartRadio Music Awards	2020	"Hot Girl Summer" (featuring Nicki Minaj & Ty Dolla Sign)	Best Lyrics	Nominated	
iHeartRadio Music Awards	2021	Herself	Female Artist of the Year	Nominated	
iHeartRadio Music Awards	2021	Herself	Hip-Hop Artist of the Year	Nominated	
iHeartRadio Music Awards	2021	"WAP" (with Cardi B)	Best Music Video	Nominated	
iHeartRadio Music Awards	2021	"WAP" (with Cardi B)	TikTok Bop of the Year	Nominated	
iHeartRadio Music Awards	2021	"Savage"	TikTok Bop of the Year	Nominated	
iHeartRadio Music Awards	2021	"Savage" (Beyoncé remix)	Best Collaboration	Won	
iHeartRadio Music Awards	2021	"Savage" (Beyoncé remix)	Hip-Hop Song of the Year	Nominated	
iHeartRadio Music Awards	2022	Herself	Trailblazer Award	Won	
iHeartRadio Music Awards	2022	Herself	Hip-Hop Artist of the Year	Nominated	
iHeartRadio Music Awards	2022	Herself	Best Fan Army	Nominated	
iHeartRadio Music Awards	2022	"Thot Shit"	TikTok Bop of the Year	Nominated	
iHeartRadio Music Awards	2023	"Sweetest Pie" (With Dua Lipa)	Best Collaboration	Nominated	
Joox Thailand Music Awards	2022	"SG" (with DJ Snake, Ozuna and Lisa)	International Song of the Year	Nominated	
MTV Millennial Awards Brazil	2020	"Savage" (Beyoncé remix)	International Collaboration	Nominated	
MTV Millennial Awards Brazil	2021	"Beautiful Mistakes" (with Maroon 5)	International Collaboration	Nominated	
MTV Africa Music Awards	2021	Herself	International Act	Nominated	
MTV Europe Music Awards	2020	"WAP"	Best Video	Nominated	
MTV Europe Music Awards	2020	"WAP"	Best Collaboration	Nominated	
MTV Europe Music Awards	2020	Herself	Best Hip-Hop	Nominated	
MTV Europe Music Awards	2022	Herself	Best Hip-Hop	Nominated	
MTV Europe Music Awards	2022	"Sweetest Pie" (with Dua Lipa)	Best Collaboration	Nominated	
MTV Europe Music Awards	2023	"Bongos" (with Cardi B)	Best Video	Nominated	
MTV Europe Music Awards	2024	Herself	Best Hip Hop	Nominated	
MTV Video Music Awards	2019	"Hot Girl Summer" (featuring Nicki Minaj & Ty Dolla Sign)	Best Power Anthem	Won	
MTV Video Music Awards	2020	Herself	Artist of the Year	Nominated	
MTV Video Music Awards	2020	"Savage"	Song of the Year	Nominated	
MTV Video Music Awards	2020	"Savage"	Best Hip-Hop	Won	
MTV Video Music Awards	2020	"Savage" (Beyoncé remix)	Song of Summer	Nominated	
MTV Video Music Awards	2020	"WAP" (with Cardi B)	Song of Summer	Nominated	
MTV Video Music Awards	2021	"WAP" (with Cardi B)	Video of the Year	Nominated	
MTV Video Music Awards	2021	"WAP" (with Cardi B)	Song of the Year	Nominated	
MTV Video Music Awards	2021	"WAP" (with Cardi B)	Best Collaboration	Nominated	
MTV Video Music Awards	2021	"WAP" (with Cardi B)	Best Hip-Hop	Nominated	
MTV Video Music Awards	2021	"On Me (Remix)" (with Lil Baby)	Best Hip-Hop	Nominated	
MTV Video Music Awards	2021	Herself	Artist of the Year	Nominated	
MTV Video Music Awards	2021	"Thot Shit"	Song of Summer	Nominated	
MTV Video Music Awards	2022	"Sweetest Pie" (with Dua Lipa)	Best Collaboration	Nominated	
MTV Video Music Awards	2022	"Sweetest Pie" (with Dua Lipa)	Best Art Direction	Nominated	
MTV Video Music Awards	2022	"Sweetest Pie" (with Dua Lipa)	Best Visual Effects	Nominated	
MTV Video Music Awards	2023	"Her"	Best Direction	Nominated	
MTV Video Music Awards	2023	"Her"	Best Art Direction	Nominated	
MTV Video Music Awards	2023	"Her"	Best Choreography	Nominated	
MTV Video Music Awards	2024	"Wanna Be" (with GloRilla)	Best Collaboration	Nominated	
MTV Video Music Awards	2024	"Wanna Be" (with GloRilla)	Song of Summer	Nominated	
MTV Video Music Awards	2024	"Boa"	Best Hip-Hop	Nominated	
MTV Video Music Awards	2024	"Boa"	Best Direction	Nominated	
MTV Video Music Awards	2024	"Boa"	Best Art Direction	Won	
MTV Video Music Awards	2024	"Boa"	Best Visual Effects	Nominated	
MTV Video Music Awards	2024	"Mamushi" (featuring Yuki Chiba)	Best Trending Video	Won	
MTV Video Music Awards	2026	"Lover Girl"	Best Hip-Hop	Pending	
Music Awards Japan	2025	Best of Listeners' Choice: International Song	"Neva Play" (featuring RM)	Won	
Music Awards Japan	2025	Best of Listeners' Choice: International Song	"Mamushi" (Remix) (featuring Twice)	Nominated	
Music Awards Japan	2025	Best of Listeners' Choice: International Song	"Mamushi" (featuring Yuki Chiba)	Nominated	
Music Awards Japan	2025	Best Cross-Border Collaboration Song	"Mamushi" (featuring Yuki Chiba)	Nominated	
Music Awards Japan	2025	Best International Hip Hop/Rap Song in Japan	"Mamushi" (featuring Yuki Chiba)	Nominated	
NAACP Image Awards	2021	"Savage" (Beyoncé remix)	Outstanding Duo, Group or Collaboration (Contemporary)	Won	
NAACP Image Awards	2021	"Savage" (Beyoncé remix)	Outstanding Hip Hop/Rap Song	Won	
NAACP Image Awards	2022	Herself	Entertainer of the Year	Nominated	
NAACP Image Awards	2024	"Cobra"	Outstanding Hip Hop/Rap Song	Won	
NAACP Image Awards	2024	"Cobra"	Outstanding Music Video/Visual Album	Nominated	
Nickelodeon Kids' Choice Awards	2020	Herself	Favorite Breakout New Artist	Nominated	
Nickelodeon Kids' Choice Awards	2023	"Sweetest Pie" (with Dua Lipa)	Favorite Music Collaboration	Won	
NME Awards	2020	"Cash Shit" (featuring DaBaby)	Best Collaboration	Nominated	
People's Choice Awards	2020	Herself	Female Artist of the Year	Nominated	
People's Choice Awards	2020	"WAP" (with Cardi B)	Music Video of the Year	Nominated	
People's Choice Awards	2020	"WAP" (with Cardi B)	Collaboration Song of the Year	Won	
People's Choice Awards	2020	"WAP" (with Cardi B)	Song of the Year	Nominated	
People's Choice Awards	2020	"Savage"	Song of the Year	Nominated	
People's Choice Awards	2020	"Savage" (Beyoncé remix)	Collaboration Song of the Year	Nominated	
Premios Lo Nuestro	2023	"SG" (with DJ Snake, Ozuna and Lisa)	Crossover Collaboration of the Year	Nominated	
Rockbjörnen	2021	"Savage" (Beyoncé remix)	Foreign Song of the Year	Nominated	
Shorty Awards	2021	#SavageChallenge	"Best in Entertainment"	Won	
Soul Train Music Awards	2019	"Cash Shit" (featuring DaBaby)	Rhythm & Bars Award	Nominated	
Soul Train Music Awards	2020	"Savage"	Rhythm & Bars Award	Won	
Soul Train Music Awards	2020	"WAP" (with Cardi B)	Rhythm & Bars Award	Nominated	
Libera Awards	2020	Suga	Best R&B/Hip-Hop Album	Nominated	
Libera Awards	2020	"Hot Girl Summer" (featuring Nicki Minaj & Ty Dolla Sign)	Marketing Genius	Won	
Libera Awards	2021	Herself	A2IM Humanitarian Award	Nominated	
UK Music Video Awards	2021	"Thot Shit"	Best Hip Hop/Grime/Rap Video – International	Won	
UK Music Video Awards	2021	"Thot Shit"	Best Color Grading in a Video	Nominated	
UK Music Video Awards	2021	"Thot Shit"	Best Editing in a Video	Nominated	
UK Music Video Awards	2024	"Cobra"	Best Hip Hop/Grime/Rap Video – International	Pending	
Variety's Hitmakers	2019	Herself	Breakthrough Artist	Won	
Webby Awards	2021	Megan Thee Stallion x New York Times – Protecting Women of Color	Best Editing, Performance & Craft (Video)	Won	
Webby Awards	2022	Herself	Webby Artist of the Year	Won	
