= Thot Shit =

2021 single by Megan Thee Stallion

Single by Megan Thee Stallion

from the album Something for Thee Hotties
- Released: June 11, 2021
- Genre: Dirty rap
- Length: 3:04
- Label: 1501 Certified; 300
- Songwriters: Megan Pete; Julian Mason; Joshua Parker
- Producers: LilJuMadeDaBeat; OG Parker

Megan Thee Stallion singles chronology
"Bad Bitches" (2021)	"Thot Shit" (2021)	"Butter" (remix) (2021)

Music video
- "Thot Shit" on YouTube

"Thot Shit" (known as "Thot Ish" in the radio edit) is a song by American rapper-songwriter Megan Thee Stallion. The first solo release following her debut studio album Good News (2020) and the lead single from her compilation album Something for Thee Hotties (2021), the song was produced by LilJuMadeDaBeat and OG Parker and was released on June 11, 2021, through 1501 Certified Entertainment and 300 Entertainment. An uptempo song with heavy bass, it began as a freestyle by Megan Thee Stallion, and was inspired by her desire to reclaim the term "thot" from men who used it in a sexist manner. The song is performed from the perspective of her "raw and aggressive" alter ego, Tina Snow.

"Thot Shit" was nominated for Best Rap Performance at the 64th Annual Grammy Awards and peaked in the top 20 in the United States. The Aube Perrie-directed music video for "Thot Shit" was released on the same day as the song. It was inspired by conservative backlash against her and Cardi B's 2020 song "WAP", and horror films such as A Nightmare on Elm Street (1984) and The Shining (1980). In it, Megan Thee Stallion and several other women follow around a hypocritical conservative politician and twerk wherever he goes to exact revenge on him for posting a sexist comment underneath Megan Thee Stallion's "Body" video on YouTube.

== Background and composition ==
Over a month before the release of "Thot Shit", several sci-fi-themed posts on Megan Thee Stallion's social media showed her in a "regeneration tank" and announced that she would be "recharging". A week before "Thot Shit" was released, she posted a CGI animation of herself announcing her return as her alter ego, Tina Snow. Megan Thee Stallion later posted a link to pre-save the song, and revealed the release date, title, and cover of "Thot Shit", which shows a shirtless man collapsed on a checkered tile floor next to a plate of food, a magazine featuring an image of Megan Thee Stallion, and a box of "Tina O's" cereal, with three women in white patent leather platform heels standing over him.

According to Megan Thee Stallion, "Thot Shit" began as a freestyle. After Shawn "Source" Jarrett, the song's engineer, asked for beats from producer OG Parker, he and producer Lil Ju met up at Parker's house in Atlanta to produce "about seven beats" together before sending them to Jarrett. Megan Thee Stallion chose to use one of them for "Thot Shit". The song was released at midnight on June 11, 2021. It was her first solo single of 2021 and her first solo release following the release of her debut studio album, Good News. It was also included on her 2021 mixtape Something for Thee Hotties as its lead single.

After the song's release, black TikTok creators went on "strike" and refused to choreograph a dance to the song. The strike was organized in response to black creators previously having not been credited or compensated for creating trending dances on the app which white TikTok users profited off of, and was intended to show that black users were essential to the success of the app. Dances created by white TikTok users to the song were heavily mocked online.

"Thot Shit" is an uptempo song with a "booming" bassline performed by Megan Thee Stallion as her "raw and aggressive" alter ego, Tina Snow, who first appeared on her 2018 EP of the same name and was inspired American rapper Pimp C's alter ego Tony Snow. The song was inspired by Megan Thee Stallion's desire to reclaim pejoratives used by men against women, such as "thot" and "hoe". The song's lyrics are described as "confidently risque" "self-confident", "sexually liberating", and "hit[ting] hard while also being playful". The chorus gives "twerk instructions". In the song, she references her three wins at the 63rd Annual Grammy Awards for Best New Artist, Best Rap Performance, and Best Rap Song with the line "I'm the shit per the Recording Academy". She also references her scheduled graduation from Texas Southern University in 2021 and the 1940 film Pinocchio, and quotes the 1998 miniseries The Temptations with the line, "Ain't nobody come to see you, Otis".

== Critical reception ==
This song received critical acclaim from critics. Rolling Stone's Mankaprr Conteh called "Thot Shit" "a sonic and visual explosion of sexuality, pride, and ideas" filled with "sharp zingers", adding that her "tone and candor" on the song combined her "hard-hitting raps" with "the strong sense of purpose she's developed as a woman that has been attacked and vilified for her boldness and honesty". Jezebel's Shannon Melero referred to the song as "an absolute banger that is all the good things about Vax/Hot Girl Summer". Pitchfork named the song "Best New Track", with Cat Zhang writing, "'Thot Shit' follows the classic Megan recipe: unapologetic sex positivity, brash and delicious boasts, sharp-tongued goofiness." The A.V. Club's Gabrielle Sanchez described "Thot Shit" as "charged and fast-paced, carrying the intensity last year's Good News too often lacked" with an "infectious" energy. Revolt's Jon Powell wrote that the song had "some of her most hard-hitting bars to date", while Clash's Robin Murray called the song "a swaggering piece of no-take-shit empowerment, one that finds Megan at her most open". Robyn Mowatt of Okayplayer described the song "biting, energetic, and ideal for the looming summer".

=== Rankings ===
Critical rankings for "Thot Shit"
Publication	Accolade	Rank	Ref.
Pitchfork	The 100 Best Songs of 2021	18	

== Accolades ==
Awards and nominations for "Thot Shit"
Year	Organization	Award	Result	Ref(s)
2021	MTV Video Music Awards	Song of Summer	Nominated	
2021	UK Music Video Awards	Best Hip Hop/Grime/Rap Video – International	Won	
2021	UK Music Video Awards	Best Color Grading in a Video	Nominated	
2021	UK Music Video Awards	Best Editing in a Video	Nominated	
2022	Grammy Awards	Best Rap Performance	Nominated	
2022	Webby Awards	Video, General Video - Music Video	Won	
2022	Webby Awards	People's Voice	Won	

== Music video ==
=== Background and inspiration ===
The music video for "Thot Shit", directed by Aube Perrie and executive produced by Boris Labourguigne, was released on the same day as the single. After seeing the music video for L'Impératrice's song "Peur des filles", also directed by Perrie and produced by Labourguigne, Megan Thee Stallion's team reached out to the pair to make the video for "Thot Shit". It was filmed over the course of two 18-hour day shoots in April and choreographed by JaQuel Knight.

Several different camera rigs were built to film twerking shots, and the filming was partially inspired by the cinéma vérité style of documentary filmmaking. Prosthetic makeup was also used for the video's final shot. Parts of the video were filmed at the 101 Coffee Shop, a defunct diner in Los Angeles. Skip Pipo stars in the video as an older conservative senator meant to represent James P. Bradley, a Republican congressional candidate for California who, after listening to American rapper Cardi B's song "WAP" featuring Megan Thee Stallion, posted on social media that the two artists "are what happens when children are raised without God and without a strong father figure" and claimed that he came across the song accidentally. A day before its release, Megan Thee Stallion teased the video by posting DJ Khaled's shocked reaction to it on her Instagram. The video's release was preceded by a livestream hosted on YouTube by Megan Thee Stallion.

=== Synopsis ===
The horror-themed video begins with the senator sitting in his office, eating Cheetos and leaving a YouTube comment underneath Megan Thee Stallion's music video for "Body", calling it "stupid" and "regressive" before unzipping his pants to masturbate to it. Megan Thee Stallion, who appears as her alter ego, Tina Snow, then anonymously calls the man to tell him not to "fuck with" the women who make up every part of his life in a monologue inspired by the 1999 film Fight Club. The senator, however, ignores the phone call after being hung up on and then proceeds to continue masturbating to the video. The next shot shows Megan's alter ego and several other working-class women (the "Hotties") then hit the man with a garbage truck, and spend their time exacting revenge on him by following him around as he does mundane tasks and twerking wherever he goes, including at a diner, in his office, in his bathtub, at the supermarket, and at a construction site. The video also references the 1984 slasher film A Nightmare on Elm Street with a scene in which Megan Thee Stallion's hand comes out of the man's bathtub and gives him the middle finger, and references the 1980 psychological horror film The Shining with a room key with the number 237 on it. The video ends with Megan Thee Stallion and the other girls grafting a labia onto his face in place of his mouth.

=== Reception ===
Andrew Sacher of BrooklynVegan called the video "very badass, especially following the right wing reactions to 'WAP'". Conteh of Rolling Stone described the video as "stylish" and "outrageous", and wrote that it was the best music video to be released this year so far. Esquire's Matt Miller wrote that the video "brilliantly skewers slut-shaming conservatives" and was "a hilarious visualization", also comparing conservative political commentators Ben Shapiro and Tucker Carlson, who commented negatively on "WAP", to the senator in the video. Gabrielle Sanchez of The A.V. Club wrote that Megan Thee Stallion addresses "the hypocrisy of sexist, derogatory comments made by men in power" about sexually empowered women "with confidence and plenty of laughs, letting the opinions of men roll off her back with ease". Erica Gonzales of Harper's Bazaar commented on the video's "absurd, dark humor" and described the visuals as "surreal". Revolt's Jon Powell wrote that the video "successfully mixes Megan's sex appeal with her aggressiveness on the microphone" and "require[s] more than a few replays". For Popsugar, Navi Ahluwalia called the video "a powerful commentary on the world of online hate", while USA Today's Elise Brisco described it as "iconic" and "empowering". Time Out's Andy Kryza called it "pure MTS, an amped up celebration of sex and expression as only the woman behind 'WAP' can muster". Allison Hussey of Pitchfork wrote that the video had a "sexy surreality" and praised the "commanding athleticism" of the other women in the video. TechCrunch's Taylor Hatmaker called the video a "a playful but important paean to essential workers" and "a biting commentary on the wealthy white establishment that exploits their labor".

In June 2021, Complex named the video for "Thot Shit" the second-best music video released that year until then, with Eric Skelton calling it "wildly entertaining, powerful, and funny" and stating that the video's ending was "the most memorable scene of the year so far". Pitchfork's Eric Torres listed the video as the best video released in June 2021, describing it as "the new crown jewel in Megan Thee Stallion's run of astounding music videos".

== Live performances ==
Megan Thee Stallion performed "Thot Shit" at the BET Awards in June 2021, at Rolling Loud Miami in July 2021, at Lollapalooza in August 2021, and at ACL (Austin City Limits) Music Festival in Austin, Texas in October 2021.

== Credits and personnel ==
Credits adapted from Tidal.

- Lil Ju – production
- OG Parker – production
- Mike Dean – mixing, mastering
- Shawn "Source" Jarrett – recording, engineering

== Charts ==
=== Weekly charts ===
Weekly chart performance
Chart (2021)	Peak position
Australia (ARIA)	38
Canada Hot 100 (Billboard)	43
Global 200 (Billboard)	27
Greece International (IFPI)	47
Ireland (IRMA)	44
Lithuania (AGATA)	92
New Zealand Hot Singles (RMNZ)	11
UK Singles (Official Charts)	65
UK Indie (Official Charts)	6
UK Hip Hop/R&B (Official Charts)	24
US Billboard Hot 100	16
US Hot R&B/Hip-Hop Songs (Billboard)	6
US R&B/Hip-Hop Airplay (Billboard)	2
US Rhythmic Airplay (Billboard)	2

=== Year-end charts ===
Year-end chart performance
Chart (2021)	Position
US Billboard Hot 100	71
US Hot R&B/Hip-Hop Songs (Billboard)	33
US Rhythmic (Billboard)	31

== Certifications ==
Region	Certification	Certified units/sales
Brazil (Pro-Música Brasil)	Platinum	40,000^{‡}
New Zealand (RMNZ)	Platinum	30,000^{‡}
Poland (ZPAV)	Gold	25,000^{‡}
United Kingdom (BPI)	Silver	200,000^{‡}
United States (RIAA)	2× Platinum	2,000,000^{‡}
^{‡} Sales+streaming figures based on certification alone.

== Release history ==
Release dates and formats
Region	Date	Format	Label	Ref.
Various	June 11, 2021	Digital download; streaming	1501 Certified; 300	
United States	June 15, 2021	Rhythmic contemporary	1501 Certified; 300	
