= Fever (mixtape) =

Mixtape by Megan Thee Stallion
- Released: May 17, 2019
- Genre: Hip-hop
- Length: 40:16
- Labels: 300; 1501 Certified
- Producers: Crazy Mike; DJ Chose; DJ WillAye; Juicy J; KC Supreme; Koncept P; LilJuMadeDaBeat; Project Pat; Prolivik Beeats; Suede; Supah Mario; DJ Zirk

Megan Thee Stallion chronology
Tina Snow (2018)	Fever (2019)	Suga (2020)

Singles from Fever
- 1. "Sex Talk" Released: March 22, 2019; 2. "Realer" Released: May 16, 2019; 3. "Cash Shit" Released: May 17, 2019

Fever is the debut commercial mixtape by American rapper-songwriter Megan Thee Stallion, released on May 17, 2019, via 300 Entertainment and 1501 Certified Entertainment. Primarily produced by LilJuMadeDaBeat and written by the rapper herself, it also features guest appearances from rappers DaBaby and Juicy J. Fever is a hip-hop record driven by minimal bass-heavy trap production. It is widely considered by music critics as Megan Thee Stallion's mainstream breakthrough.

The mixtape received widespread acclaim from music critics, with many praising the rapper's delivery and sex-positivity. Apart from being featured on various year-end lists, Fever also won the BET Hip Hop Award for Best Mixtape. Commercially, it debuted at number 10 on the Billboard 200, and was certified gold in the United States by the Recording Industry Association of America. Fever also spawned the RIAA Quintuple-Platinum song "Cash Shit".

== Background and release ==
In April 2019, Megan Thee Stallion scored her first chart entry on the Billboard Hot 100 with the single "Big Ole Freak" from the EP Tina Snow (2018), signifying her mainstream popularization. With this newly cumulated audience, the rapper formally announced the release of Fever, alongside a trailer posted to her social media accounts on May 8, 2019, which introduces "Hot Girl Meg", an alter ego for the mixtape. The trailer is a snippet of the music video for "Realer" in which Hot Girl Meg drives in a red convertible with three other women. The rapper officially revealed the album cover and tracklist on May 14, 2019. In July 2019, Megan Thee Stallion teased the release of Fever: Thee Movie, a cinematic project directed by Hype Williams. Despite the announcement being captioned "coming soon", the project was not released.

The lead single from Fever, "Sex Talk", had prior been released to all major streaming services and digital platforms on March 22, 2019. The second single, "Realer", was released a day before the mixtape. This single was later accompanied by a music video on May 21, 2019. The song "Cash Shit" featuring DaBaby was released as the third single and reached a peak of number 36 on the Billboard Hot 100. "Cash Shit" would also go on to become Megan Thee Stallion's first-ever RIAA-certified platinum single, and her second-ever top 40 hit on the Billboard Hot 100, after "Hot Girl Summer".

== Composition and concept ==
Fever is a hip-hop record with trap influences. It consists primarily of "minimal bass-heavy production". American record producer LilJuMadeDaBeat is credited as a producer on six of the fourteen tracks included on Fever, while American rapper and record producer Juicy J as credited as a producer on three and a featured artist on one. Production throughout the record also heavily incorporates the use of sampling. Many of the works sampled were originally made by or are directly related to the hip-hop group Three 6 Mafia, of which Juicy J is a part of. Megan Thee Stallion has not only cited Three 6 Mafia as a major influence on the record, but also ultimately on her as a musician. Aesthetically, Fever is heavily influenced by the film genre blaxploitation, with the album cover specifically drawing comparisons to American actress Pam Grier.

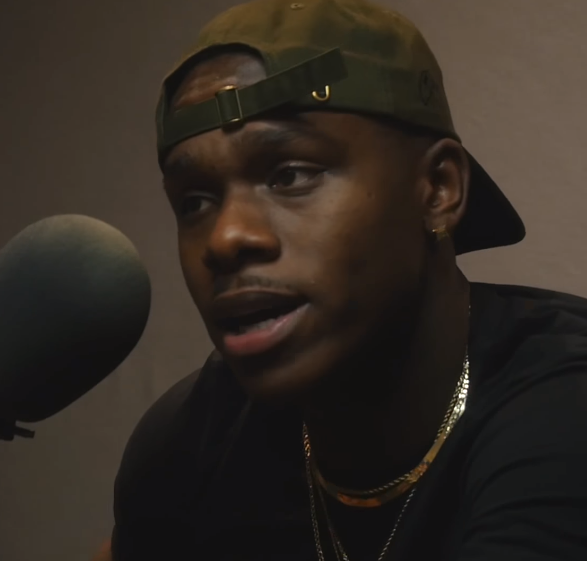
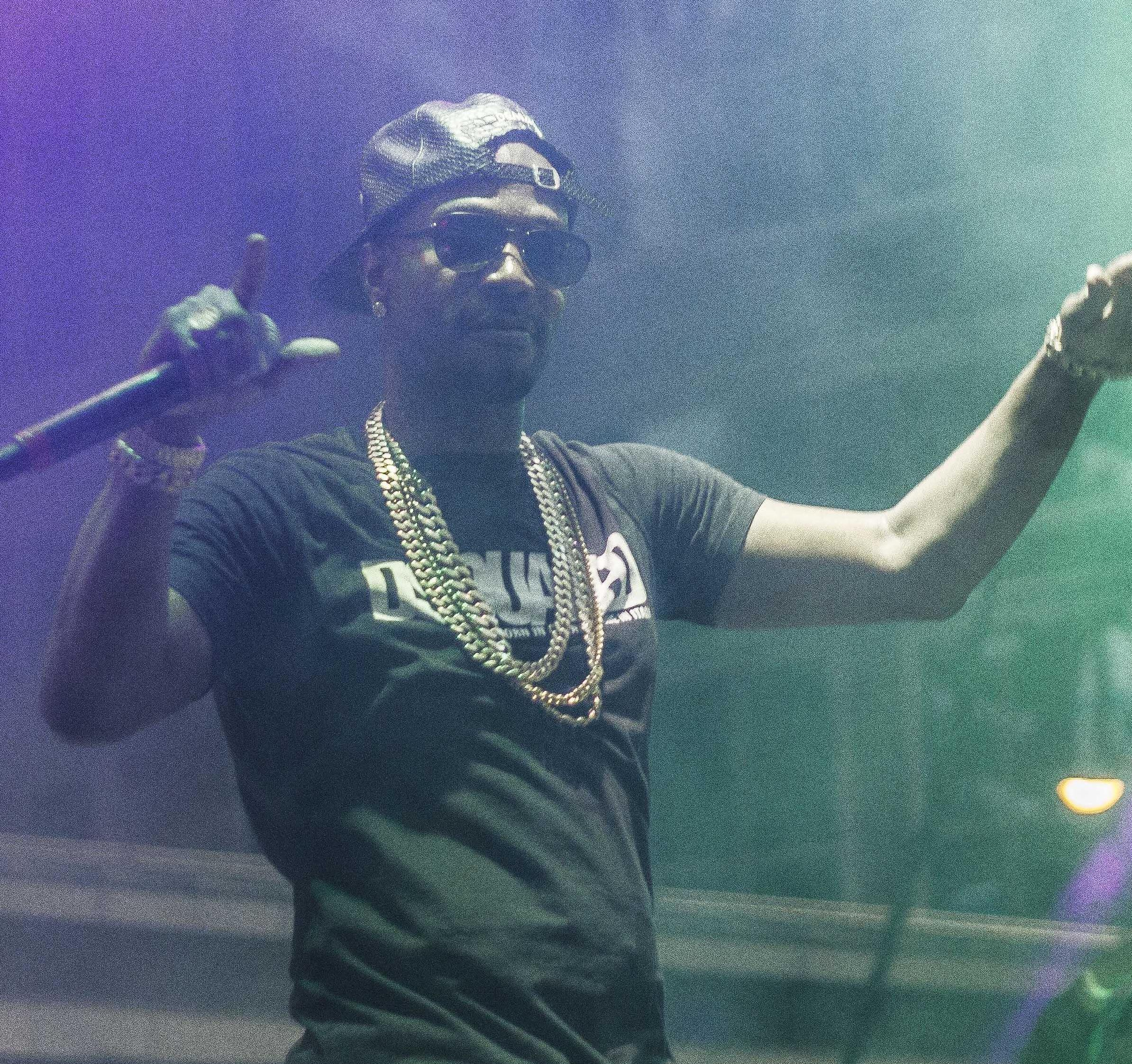
Fever features guest vocals from DaBaby (left) and Juicy J (right), with the latter producing several tracks on the record.

The mixtape's second track "Hood Rat Shit" samples a viral 2008 WPBF 25 news broadcast in which 7-year old Latarian Milton is interviewed after he stole his mother's Dodge Durango. On the track, Megan Thee Stallion also lyrically makes references to South Park and Wakanda by means of name-dropping. The third track on Fever, "Pimpin", is one of three produced by Juicy J and samples the 1996 song "Azz Out" by American record producer DJ Zink & Tha 2 Thick Family featuring rappers 8Ball & MJG and Kilo-G. The fourth track, "Cash Shit" featuring DaBaby, earned critical acclaim by making several year-end lists, and subsequently went on to top the US Urban radio chart, and featured as the opener on the fictional iFruit Radio in Grand Theft Auto V. The simple instrumentation of the track is "a beat with no melody" made within five minutes, which incorporates the Roland TR-808, a southside hand clap, a water splash, as well as one open and one closed hi-hat in the left and right channels. The fifth track, "W.A.B", samples the song "Weak Azz Bitch" by Three 6 Mafia featuring LA Chat, hence its titular acronym. Juicy J is credited for both his vocal guest appearance and production on the track "Simon Says", which samples both the 1972 song "Me and Mrs. Jones" by Billy Paul, as well as the 1992 song "Looking For Tha Chewin'" by DJ Paul featuring Kilo-G, DJ Zirk, Kingpin Skinny Pimp and 8Ball & MJG. With the lyric "No, I'm not that nigga that be hugged up with your butt", Megan Thee Stallion also interpolates the song "No I'm Not Dat Nigga" by Three 6 Mafia featuring Juicy J. "Dance", the tenth track on Fever, lyrically and melodically interpolates the song 2012 "Bandz A Make Her Dance" by Juicy J. The twelfth track on the mixtape, "Sex Talk", samples the song "Pow" by Soulja Boy, while Megan Thee Stallion also lyrically references her breakthrough single "Big Ole Freak". The thirteenth track, "Big Drank", samples the song "Sippin' on Some Syrup" by Three 6 Mafia featuring Project Pat and UGK. "Runnin Up Freestyle" closes the mixtape and had first been performed by Megan Thee Stallion during the Fire in the Booth segment on the Charlie Sloth Rap Show in March 2019.

== Reception ==
=== Critical response ===
Professional ratings
Aggregate scores
Source	Rating
Metacritic	81/100
Review scores
Source	Rating
AllMusic	4/5 stars
Austin Chronicle	3.5/5 stars
Exclaim!	8.0/10
Highsnobiety	4.5/5 stars
HipHopDX	4.0/5
The Needle Drop	7.0/10
Pitchfork	8.0/10
RapReviews	6.5/10
Tiny Mix Tapes	4.5/5 marks
The Wire	4/5 stars

According to the review aggregator Metacritic, Fever received "universal acclaim" based on a weighted average score of 81 out of 100 from 9 critic scores. Megan Thee Stallion received praise for her sex drive and sex-positivity, her aggressive delivery, and her quirky and humorous lyrics.

Fred Thomas of AllMusic claimed that "with near-peerless levels of confidence, fearlessly bold lyricism, and relentless, expertly crafted beats, Fever establishes Megan Thee Stallion as a figure in Southern rap." Taylor Crumpton of Pitchfork noted that the rapper's debut is "steeped in sex, pimpin, and power; it sounds like a once and future Houston rap classic". Jon Caramanica of New York Times considered Megan's rise to prominence with freestyles and wrote that "Fever is more cohesive, polished and forceful than her previous releases. The production — especially the songs by [LilJuMadeDatBeat] — is ominous and spacious, a foundation that's sturdy and not distracting." Writing for The Fader, Amani Bin Shikhan wrote, "That's the magic of her appeal, and the magic of Fever: Listening to Thee Stallion feels like listening to the advice of your most entertaining girlfriend, lovingly scolding you to both get your shit together and fuck it up for a real one."

=== Accolades ===
Fever landed on several critics' and publications' year-end lists. It was ranked number one on American magazine Paper's year-end list of 2019 albums, while its single "Cash Shit" was also ranked number one on their year-end list of 2019 summer songs. "Cash Shit" would also make year-end lists from publications such as Noisey (No. 1), Vulture (No. 9), The New York Times (No. 10), Rolling Stone (No. 27), and Billboard, among others.

Critic rankings for Fever
Critic/Organization	List	Rank	Ref.
AllMusic	AllMusic Best of 2019	—N/a	
Billboard	The 50 Best Albums of 2019	23	
BrooklynVegan	Top 50 Albums of 2019	29	
Complex	The Best Albums of 2019	24	
Exclaim!	The 10 Best Hip-Hop Albums of 2019	9	
Fact	The Best Albums of 2019	—N/a	
The Fader	The best albums of 2019	—N/a	
Fresh Air (Ken Tucker)	Top 10 Albums Of 2019	5	
Gothamist	The Best Albums of 2019	12	
HipHopDX	The Best Hip Hop Albums of 2019	11	
Noisey	The 100 Best Albums of 2019	49	
Paper	The 20 Best Albums of 2019	1	
Paste	The 50 Best Albums of 2019	46	
The Ringer	The Best Albums of 2019	2	
Rolling Stone	The 50 Best Albums of 2019	31	
Rolling Stone	The 20 Best Hip-Hop Albums of 2019	7	
Stereogum	The 10 Best Rap Albums of 2019	8	
Thrillist	Best Albums of 2019	10	
Uproxx	The Best Albums of 2019	16	

== Industry awards ==
Award	Year (Note: Indicates the year of ceremony. Each year is linked to the article about the awards held that year, wherever possible.)	Category	Result	Ref.
BET Hip Hop Awards	2019	Best Mixtape	Won	
BET Awards	2020	Album of the Year	Nominated	

== Commercial performance ==
Fever debuted at number ten on the US Billboard 200 with 27,956 album-equivalent units, of which 3,725 were pure album sales.

== Track listing ==
All tracks are written by Megan Pete except where noted.

Fever track listing
No.	Title	Writer(s)	Producer(s)	Length
1.	"Realer"		LilJuMadeDaBeat	2:29
2.	"Hood Rat Shit"		KC Supreme; Koncept P	3:01
3.	"Pimpin"		Juicy J; Keenan Webb; Crazy Mike^{[a]}	3:23
4.	"Cash Shit" (featuring DaBaby)	Pete; Jonathan Kirk	LilJuMadeDaBeat	3:12
5.	"W.A.B (Weak Ass Bitch)"		Project Pat; Supah Mario	2:57
6.	"Best You Ever Had"		DJ Chose	2:39
7.	"Simon Says" (featuring Juicy J)	Pete; Jordan Houston	Juicy J; Webb; Crazy Mike^{[a]}	3:20
8.	"Shake That"		LilJuMadeDaBeat	2:52
9.	"Money Good"		DJ Chose	3:17
10.	"Dance"		Juicy J; Crazy Mike^{[a]}	2:56
11.	"Ratchet"		LilJuMadeDaBeat; Prolivik Beeats	2:14
12.	"Sex Talk"	Pete	DJ WillAye	2:11
13.	"Big Drank"		LilJuMadeDaBeat	3:27
14.	"Running Up Freestyle"		LilJuMadeDaBeat	2:04
Total length:				40:09

Notes

- ^{^[a]} signifies a co-producer

== Charts ==
=== Weekly charts ===
Chart (2019)	Peak position
US Billboard 200	10
US Top R&B/Hip-Hop Albums (Billboard)	6

=== Year-end charts ===
Chart (2019)	Position
US Billboard 200	163
US Top R&B/Hip-Hop Albums (Billboard)	62

== Certifications ==
Region	Certification	Certified units/sales
United States (RIAA)	Gold	500,000^{‡}
^{‡} Sales+streaming figures based on certification alone.
