= LilJuMadeDaBeat =

American record producer and songwriter (born 1992)

- Born: Julian Martrel Mason; March 17, 1992 (age 34); DeSoto, Texas, United States
- Education: University of Houston
- Musical career
- Origin: Houston, Texas, United States
- Genres: Hip hop; pop
- Occupations: Record producer; songwriter
- Label: 1501 Certified

Julian Martrel Mason (born March 17, 1992), better known under the pseudonym LilJuMadeDaBeat, is an American record producer and songwriter, most known for his work with 2 Chainz, Beyoncé and Megan Thee Stallion. Mason has co-written and/or produced hits "Big Ole Freak", "Cash Shit", "Captain Hook", "Body", "Megan's Piano", and "Thot Shit" among others.

== Early life ==
Born in DeSoto, a smaller suburb of Dallas, Mason's love of music can be traced back to exposure to his parents' record collection. A friend introduced him to a demo version of music production software FL Studio in grade ten, and he began creating productions. He subsequently joined his DeSoto High School band as a percussionist, graduating in the top 10 percent of his class, and attended University of Houston for a period after being accepted into their architecture program.

== Career ==
=== 2013–2016: Music industry beginnings and Gucci Mane ===
In 2013, three years after graduating high school, and encountering some academic trouble in college, Mason dropped out and remained in Houston. Wanting to realize his dream of making music instead of architecture, Mason's past experimentation with FL Studio was met with success, as Atlanta rapper Gucci Mane utilized one of his productions to create "With My Pistol", later placed on his 2013 mixtape World War 3, Vol. 3: Gas. Discussions began for Gucci Mane to sign Mason as a producer to his label, but legal trouble for the rapper ended these discussions, and Mason continued to work behind the scenes as a freelance music producer for another five years.

=== 2017–2024: Megan Thee Stallion, 1501 Entertainment, and Renaissance ===
In 2017, Mason was contracted by label 1501 Certified to become their in-house producer, working with potential signee Megan Pete, then an up-and-coming rapper from Houston. The first song they created together was “Tina Montana", which would become the first track made for her breakout 2018 EP Tina Snow. Coupled with breakout single "Big Ole Freak", her career began to take off, and Mason was signed to a publishing deal with Sony Music Publishing. Mason has since written and produced on top-10 Megan Thee Stallion projects Fever (2019) Suga (2020), Good News (2020), Something for Thee Hotties (2021), Traumazine (2022), and Megan (2024), recently reaching number one on the Billboard Rap Producers chart. Mason next worked with fellow Houstonian Beyoncé, who would use one of his production loops to complete the first 36 seconds of "Thique", a record from her 2022 album Renaissance that was initially created almost a decade earlier from a skeleton produced by rapper-producer Hit-Boy. In 2024, Mason co-composed and co-produced "Hiss" from Megan Thee Stallion's self-titled third studio album, later debuting at number one on the Billboard Hot 100 and Global 200 charts, and top five on various international charts.

== Production and songwriting credits ==
Credits are courtesy of Discogs, Tidal, Apple Music, Genius, and AllMusic.

Title	Year	Artist	Album
"With My Pistol"	2013	Gucci Mane	World War 3, Vol. 3: Gas
"OK Bitch"	2018	2 Chainz	The Play Don't Care Who Makes It
"Walking Ticket"	2018	Key Glock	Glockoma
"Freak Nasty"	2018	Megan Thee Stallion	Tina Snow
"Neva"	2018	Megan Thee Stallion	Tina Snow
"Big Ole Freak"	2018	Megan Thee Stallion	Tina Snow
"Tina Montana"	2018	Megan Thee Stallion	Tina Snow
"Make a Bag" (featuring Moneybagg Yo)	2018	Megan Thee Stallion	Tina Snow
"Realer"	2019	Megan Thee Stallion	Fever
"Cash Shit" (featuring DaBaby)	2019	Megan Thee Stallion	Fever
"Shake That"	2019	Megan Thee Stallion	Fever
"Ratchet"	2019	Megan Thee Stallion	Fever
"Big Drank"	2019	Megan Thee Stallion	Fever
"Running Up Freestyle"	2019	Megan Thee Stallion	Fever
"Stank Walk"	2019	Asian Doll	Fight Night
"Captain Hook"	2020	Megan Thee Stallion	Suga (EP)
"Do It on the Tip" (featuring City Girls)	2020	Megan Thee Stallion	Good News
"Body"	2020	Megan Thee Stallion	Good News
"Lambo Wrist"	2020	2 Chainz	So Help Me God!
"Megan Monday Freestyle"	2021	Megan Thee Stallion	Something for Thee Hotties
"Southside Forever Freestyle"	2021	Megan Thee Stallion	Something for Thee Hotties
"Outta Town Freestyle"	2021	Megan Thee Stallion	Something for Thee Hotties
"Megan's Piano"	2021	Megan Thee Stallion	Something for Thee Hotties
"Tina Snow Interlude"	2021	Megan Thee Stallion	Something for Thee Hotties
"Thot Shit"	2021	Megan Thee Stallion	Something for Thee Hotties
"Flip Flop"	2022	Megan Thee Stallion	Traumazine
"Get It on the Floor" (featuring J. Alphonse Nicholson)	2022	Megan Thee Stallion	P-Valley: Season 2 (Music From the Original TV Series)
"Thique"	2022	Beyoncé	Renaissance
"Million Dollars Worth of Game" (featuring 42 Dugg)	2022	2 Chainz	Dope Don't Sell Itself
"Shiest Talk" (featuring Pooh Shiesty)	2022	Lil Baby	It's Only Me
"Pop That Trunk"	2022	Juicy J & Wiz Khalifa	Stoner's Night
"The Recipe"	2022	Babyface & Muni Long	Girls' Night Out
"Same Side" (featuring Rob49)	2023	Lil Durk	Almost Healed
"You" (featuring Bryson Tiller)	2023	Lola Brooke	Dennis Daughter
"Hiss"	2024	Megan Thee Stallion	Megan
"Boa"	2024	Megan Thee Stallion	Megan
"Rattle"	2024	Megan Thee Stallion	Megan
"Figueroa"	2024	Megan Thee Stallion	Megan
"Where Them Girls At"	2024	Megan Thee Stallion	Megan
"B.A.S"	2024	Megan Thee Stallion	Megan
"It's Prime Day (Amazon Music)"	2024	Megan Thee Stallion	Megan
"Neva Play" (featuring RM)	2024	Megan Thee Stallion	Megan: Act II
"Number One Rule"	2024	Megan Thee Stallion	Megan: Act II
"Roc Steady" (featuring Flo Milli)	2024	Megan Thee Stallion	Megan: Act II

== Awards and nominations ==
Year	Work	Award	Result	Ref
2019	"Big Ole Freak"	BET Hip-Hop Award for Single of the Year	Nominated	
2023	Renaissance	Grammy Award for Album of the Year	Nominated	
2023	Renaissance	Grammy Award for Best Dance/Electronic Album ^{A}	Won	

=== Notes ===
A. ^{A} Winning producers in this category with less than a 50% album contribution are awarded with a Winner's Certificate.
