= Megan Thee Stallion =

American rapper and songwriter (born 1995)

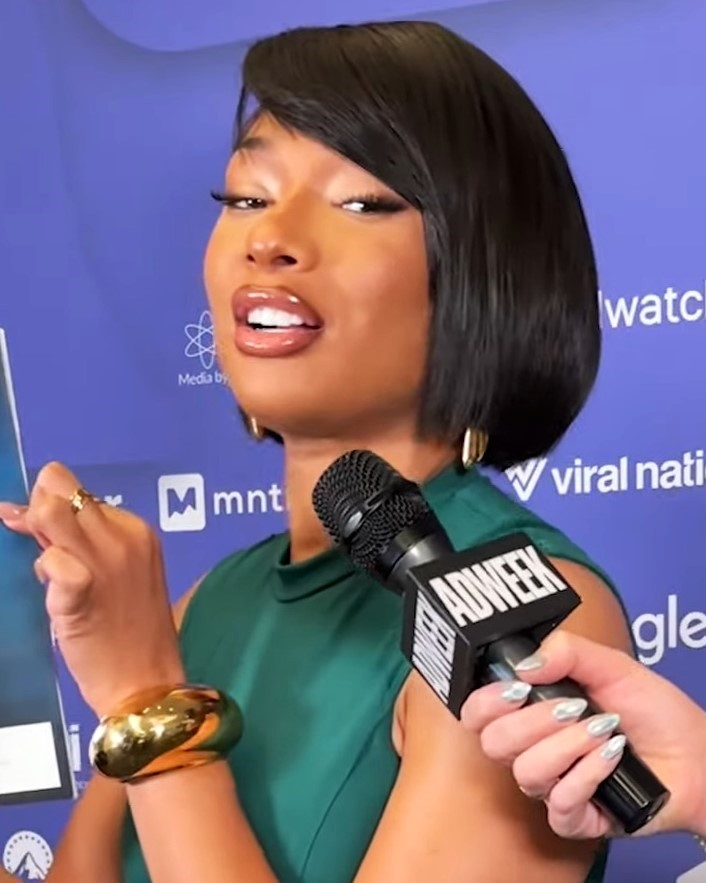
- Megan Thee Stallion in 2024
- Born: Megan Jovon Ruth Pete; February 15, 1995 (age 31); San Antonio, Texas, U.S.
- Other names: Tina Snow; Meg Thee Stallion; Hot Girl Coach; Hot Girl Meg
- Education: Pearland High School; Texas Southern University (BS)
- Occupations: Rapper; songwriter; actress
- Years active: 2016–present
- Awards: Full list
- Musical career
- Origin: Houston, Texas, U.S.
- Genres: Southern hip-hop; trap; dirty rap
- Works: Megan Thee Stallion discography
- Labels: 300; 1501; Warner Music; Interscope
- Website: megantheestallion.com

Megan Jovon Ruth Pete (born February 15, 1995), known professionally as Megan Thee Stallion, (Note: Pronounced "the", not "thee". Specifically, she pronounces the "Thee" as an unstressed /ðə/, and not /ðiː/ as in "thee" or a stressed "the".) is an American rapper, songwriter, and actress. She gained recognition after videos of her freestyling went viral on social media. After signing 1501 Certified Entertainment, she released her debut mixtape Fever (2019) and the extended play Suga (2020), both of which reached the top ten of the Billboard 200. She achieved mainstream success with the singles "Cash Shit", "Hot Girl Summer", and "Savage".

Megan's debut studio album, Good News (2020), included a remix of "Savage" featuring Beyoncé, which topped the Billboard Hot 100 and won two Grammy Awards. In 2021, she featured on Cardi B's single "WAP", which became her second US number-one single. Her next studio albums, Traumazine (2022) and Megan (2024), were influenced by a lawsuit with her former label. The latter's second single, "Hiss", became her first solo number-one single on the Billboard Hot 100 and made her the first solo female rapper to debut at number one on the Billboard Global 200.

Megan is the recipient of various accolades, including six BET Awards, five BET Hip Hop Awards, four American Music Awards, four MTV Video Music Awards, a Billboard Women in Music Award, and three Grammy Awards. At the 63rd Annual Grammy Awards, she became the second female rapper to win Best New Artist, after Lauryn Hill in 1999. Time named her one of the 100 most influential people in the world in 2020. She has also pursued acting, including starring in the 2026 Broadway production of Moulin Rouge! The Musical and the documentary Megan Thee Stallion: In Her Words (2024).

== Early life and education ==
Megan Jovon Ruth Pete was born on February 15, 1995, in San Antonio, Texas. She and her mother, Holly Thomas, moved to Houston shortly after her birth. Holly, a rapper known as "Holly-Wood", often took Megan to recording sessions instead of daycare. Megan's father was in jail for the first eight years of her life. An only child, Megan grew up in Houston's South Park neighborhood. She moved to Pearland with her mother when she was 14, and lived there until she was 18.

Megan has described herself as a quiet and observant child, having been bullied for these traits when she was in elementary school. After being particularly upset by a remark made to her, she was inspired by her mother to stand up for herself. In middle school, she defended a classmate who was bullied for his homosexuality. Megan attended Pearland High School, graduating in 2013. Her father died during her freshman year of high school.

Megan began writing raps at age 14. She would steal instrumentals from her mother and write songs over them. When she eventually showed her mother her rapping skills at age 18, Holly required that Megan wait until she was 21 to pursue rap as a career, commenting that her lyrics were too sexually suggestive for her young age. While studying at Prairie View A&M University, Megan's freestyling videos on social media gained popularity, notably one where she was battling against male opponents in a cypher. The exposure helped her gain fans, whom she refers to as "hotties" and credits for her early success. After taking time off from school to pursue music, she returned home and resumed her studies at Texas Southern University. She graduated on December 11, 2021, with a Bachelor of Science in health administration.

Megan adopted the stage name "Megan Thee Stallion" after she was called a "stallion" during her adolescence due to her height of 5 ft 10 in (1.78 m) and "thick" body frame; voluptuous, statuesque women in the southern United States are sometimes colloquially called "stallions".

== Career ==
=== 2016–2017: Early beginnings ===
In 2016, Megan Thee Stallion released her debut single "Like a Stallion," followed by SoundCloud-exclusive mixtapes Rich Ratchet and Megan Mix in 2017. That year she made her professional solo debut with the EP Make It Hot, which included the hit "Last Week in HTx" earning several million views on YouTube. Additionally, she released the song "Stalli (Freestyle)", as a rework of late musician XXXTentacion's "Look at Me!". Around this time, Megan auditioned for the since-postponed Love & Hip Hop: Houston.

=== 2018–2019: Tina Snow and Fever ===
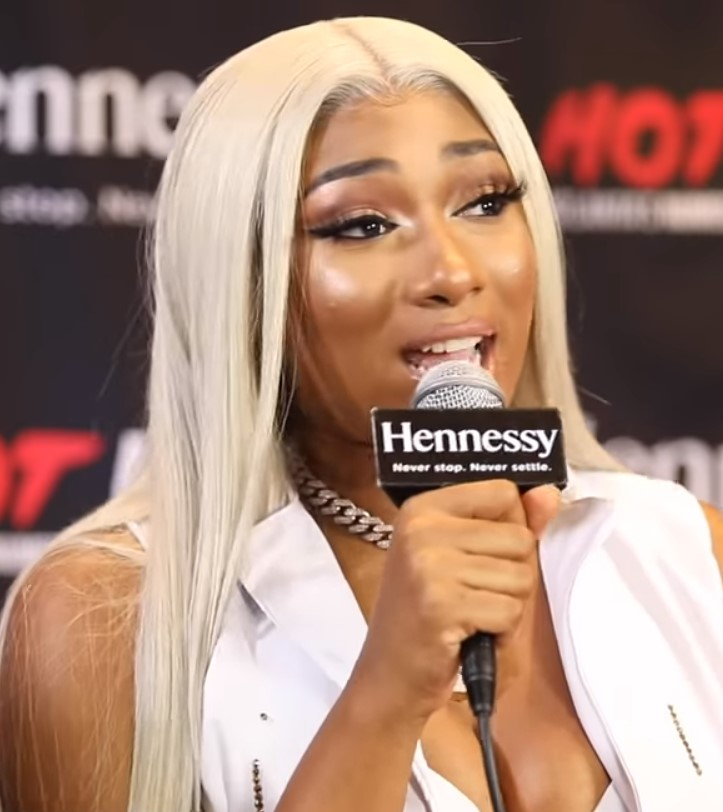
Megan Thee Stallion in 2019

In early 2018, Megan Thee Stallion signed with 1501 Certified Entertainment, an independent Houston label run by T. Farris and owned by former baseball player Carl Crawford. She was the first female rapper to join the label, and subsequently performed at SXSW Festival in March 2018. In June 2018, she released the EP Tina Snow named after her alter ego, "Tina Snow", who she describes as "a more raw version" of herself. The EP, mainly produced by 1501's in-house producer LilJuMadeDaBeat, was positively received by critics with Eric Torres of Pitchfork highlighting its "quotable lyrics" and Nandi Howard of The Fader praising her rapid and precise rapping style. In November 2018, Megan signed with 300 Entertainment, becoming the first woman on the label. It was during this time that she was scheduled to support Australian rapper Iggy Azalea on her planned Bad Girls Tour; however, the tour was later cancelled due to low ticket sales.

On January 22, 2019, Megan released "Big Ole Freak" as a single from Tina Snow, which became her first Billboard Hot 100 chart entry, peaking at number 65. Her mixtape Fever, released on May 17, 2019, received critical acclaim. On May 21, 2019, she released the music video for the track "Realer", which was inspired by the blaxploitation film style. On June 20, 2019, Megan was selected as one of eleven artists for the 12th edition of XXL's "Freshman Class". Her freestyle in the cypher was praised by music critics.

In July 2019, Megan was featured on Chance the Rapper's debut studio album The Big Day, on the track "Handsome". On August 2, 2019, A Black Lady Sketch Show premiered on HBO; using Megan's song "Hot Girl" in the opening title sequence. In August 2019, Megan's single "Hot Girl Summer", featuring Nicki Minaj and Ty Dolla Sign peaked at number 11 on the US Billboard Hot 100, becoming her first top 20 single, and topping the Rolling Stone 100. The song, an ode to her viral "hot girl summer" meme, came about after an Instagram Live session between Minaj and Megan.

Megan then appeared on the Quality Control compilation album Quality Control: Control the Streets, Volume 2 on the track "Pastor" (alongside Quavo and City Girls). In September 2019, Megan signed a management deal with Roc Nation. The company, co-founded and led by CEO Desiree Perez, helped launch Megan's return to global touring in 2022. In October 2019, Megan created and starred in a horror series for Halloween, Hottieween (directed by Teyana Taylor). She also performed her first NPR Tiny Desk Concert during the Tiny Desk Fest. In November 2019, Time placed Megan on their inaugural "Time 100 Next" list.

=== 2020–2021: Career stardom, Suga and Good News ===
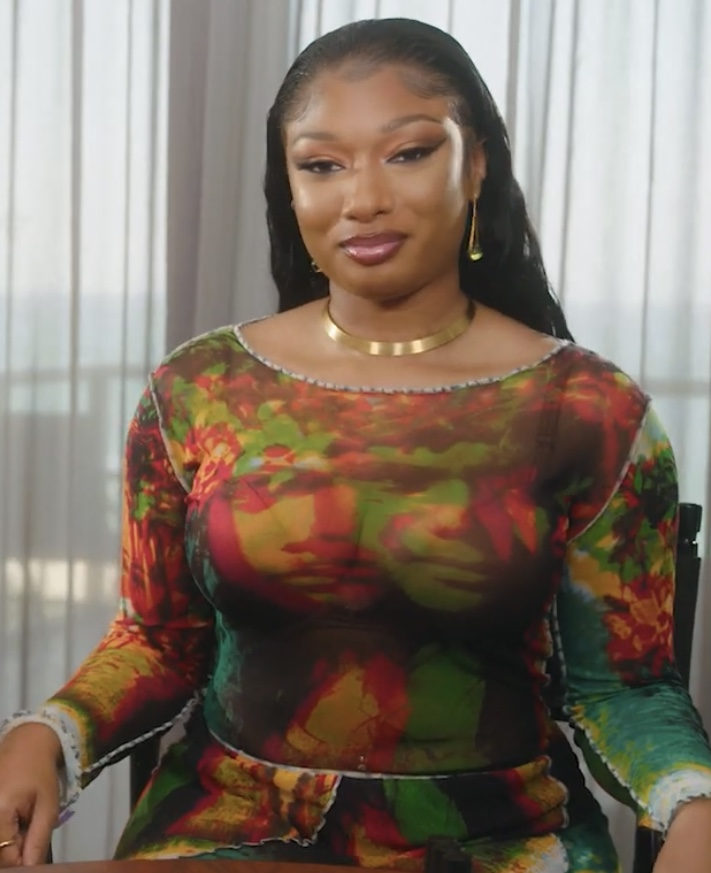
Megan Thee Stallion in 2021

In January 2020, Megan Thee Stallion released the single "Diamonds" featuring singer Normani for the soundtrack of the superhero film Birds of Prey (2020). That same month, she announced her debut album Suga and released the lead single "B.I.T.C.H.". In February 2020, she featured on the single "Fkn Around" by Phony Ppl, and appeared on The Tonight Show Starring Jimmy Fallon, performing "B.I.T.C.H.". In March, she announced that her debut album's release was being delayed as a result of her attempts to renegotiate her contract with 1501 Certified. That same month, the song "Savage", from the EP, went viral on TikTok, when popular user Keara Wilson used it for a dance challenge video, amassing 15.7 million views and 2.4 million likes, as of March 20, 2020.

A remix featuring Beyoncé was released on April 29, 2020. The song became Megan's first top 10 entry in the United States shortly after the remix's release, eventually becoming her first chart topper in the country. "Savage" also helped boost Suga's sales, propelling it up to number 7 on the Billboard 200. She released the song "Girls in the Hood" on June 26, 2020, before featuring on Cardi B's single "WAP" and appearing in its music video in August 2020. "WAP" became her second number-one single in the U.S., breaking the record for the most streams for a song in its first week of release in the U.S. (93 million).

Megan became a Global Brand Ambassador for Revlon in August 2020. She received her first-ever Billboard Music Award nomination when she was nominated for Top Rap Female Artist in September 2020. A few days later, she was featured in the annual Time 100 list of the most-influential people in the world. Her write-up for this listing was composed by American actress Taraji P. Henson. Megan tied with Drake when she received eight nominations at the 2020 BET Hip Hop Awards, including Artist of the Year, Song of the Year and Album of the Year. She also tied with Justin Bieber as the most-nominated musician at the 2020 People's Choice Awards, earning six nominations. Megan became the second-most-nominated act at the 2020 American Music Awards.

In October 2020, she released the single "Don't Stop" featuring rapper Young Thug, and promoted it by performing on the 46th season premiere of Saturday Night Live. She performed a "politically-charged" version of "Savage" that evening, in which she addressed racism, the Attorney General of Kentucky Daniel Cameron, and sent a message about the importance of protecting black women and the Black Lives Matter movement. She continued working for this cause by writing an op-ed for The New York Times titled "Why I Speak Up for Black Women", which received acclaim.

Megan appeared in the 2020 comedy special Sarah Cooper: Everything's Fine. She received four nominations at the 63rd Annual Grammy Awards, including Best New Artist and Record of the Year for "Savage (Remix)". She went on to win the former, which made her the first female hip hop artist to do so since Lauryn Hill in 1999; additionally, she took home awards for Best Rap Song and Best Rap Performance, both for "Savage (Remix)".

On November 20, 2020, Megan released her debut studio album, Good News. The release of the album also coincided with its fourth single, "Body", with its accompanying music video. "Body" was a commercial success and made her the first woman in history to achieve three number-one Streaming Songs in a single calendar year. Good News debuted at number 2 on the Billboard 200, and at number 1 on the Top R&B/Hip-Hop Albums, with over 100,000 album-equivalent units sold. On January 14, 2021, Megan was featured on a remix of Ariana Grande's single "34+35", the second single from her sixth studio album Positions, alongside American singer and rapper Doja Cat. A music video for the remix was on February 12, 2021.

In June, she released the single "Thot Shit", with a music video featuring a hypocritical, socially conservative politician. Megan took home the most awards at the 2021 BET Awards ceremony, with four nominations won. Boy band BTS released a remix of the single "Butter" featuring Megan Thee Stallion, which reached number three on the Billboard Global 200. She also led the nominations for the 2021 BET Hip Hop Awards along with Cardi B, with nine categories each; both rappers won the most awards during that ceremony, including three for "WAP". Megan was featured on DJ Snake's single "SG", along with Ozuna and Lisa of Blackpink, released in October. Megan released Something for Thee Hotties, a collection of previously unreleased songs and freestyles, on October 29, 2021. The compilation album debuted at number five on the US Billboard 200, becoming Megan's fourth top 10.

On September 16, 2021, Post Malone announced the Posty Fest 2021 lineup, with Megan as one of the performers at the festival based in Arlington, Texas, to be held that October. Megan was honored as one of Glamour's Women of the Year in November. Megan won three awards at the 2021 American Music Awards, tying with Doja Cat and BTS for the most wins that night.

On July 19, 2021, Megan became the first rapper and non-athlete featured on the front cover of Sports Illustrated Swimsuit, with Megan stating to CNN; "...it was a dream come true," and that "it definitely was a dream for me to be on Sports Illustrated Swimsuit, and to be the first female rapper? Who else would they pick? I am just happy they chose the Hot Girl Coach!".

Megan graduated from Texas Southern University on December 11, 2021. Shortly after, Megan was honored with the 18th Congressional District of Texas Hero Award by Rep. Sheila Jackson Lee for her philanthropy efforts in Houston.

=== 2022–23: Traumazine ===
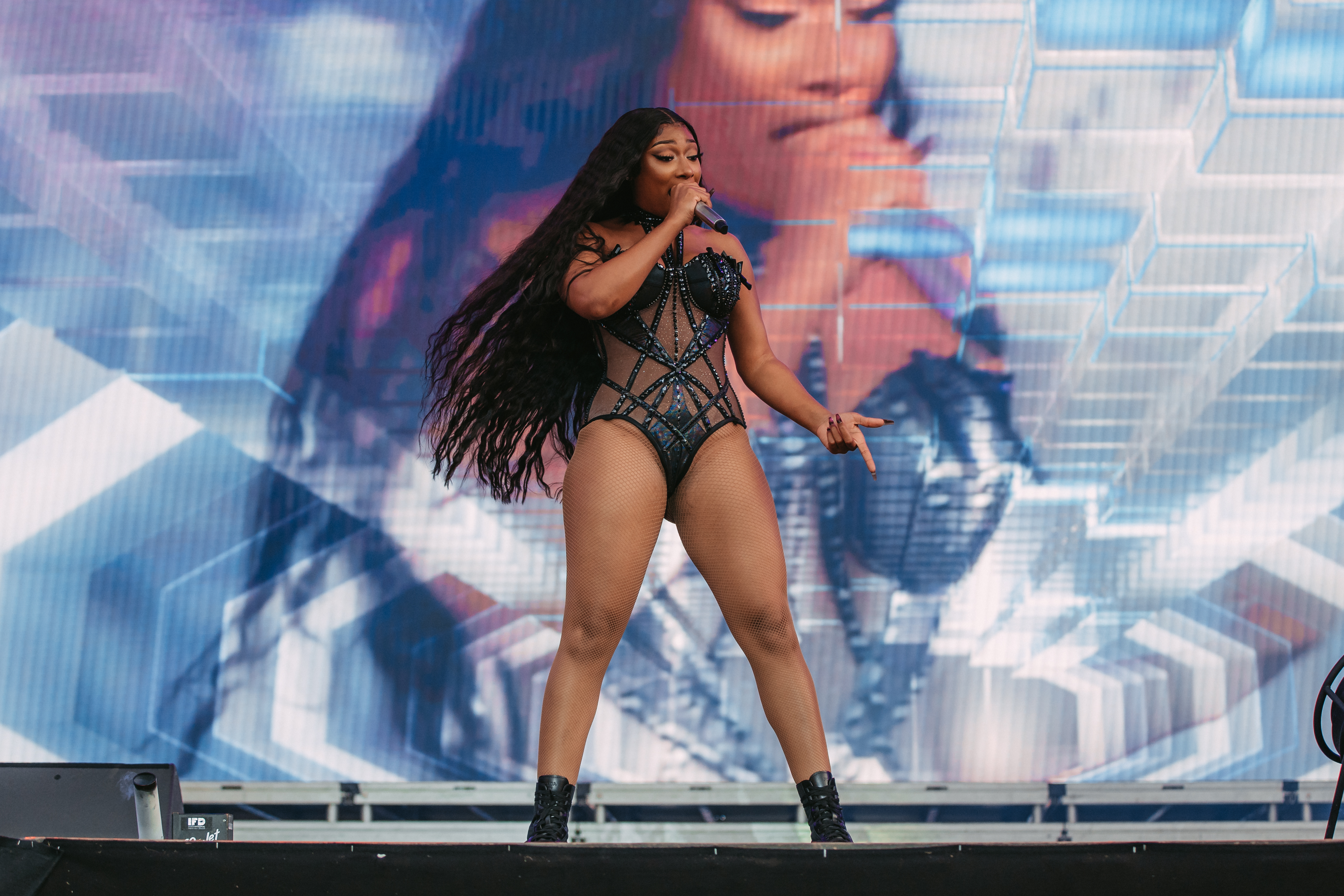
Megan Thee Stallion at the 2022 Positivus Festival

On March 11, 2022, Megan Thee Stallion released a collaboration with English singer Dua Lipa, named "Sweetest Pie". On March 27, Megan made a surprise appearance at the 94th Academy Awards performing "We Don't Talk About Bruno" alongside various artists from the film Encanto. Megan became the second woman rapper to perform at the Academy Awards, following Queen Latifah in the 81st Academy Awards ceremony. She received acclaim at the Oscars for the surprise performance, with Rolling Stone stating: "Megan Thee Stallion Makes 'Encanto' Track...All the More Magical at Oscars."

In a Rolling Stone cover story, Megan revealed that she collaborated with Future for her upcoming second album on a song titled "Pressurelicious". On August 11, 2022, Megan took to Twitter to announce that her second studio album Traumazine would be released the next day. It became the rapper's fifth US top-10 album. After the low promotion of Traumazine by the label, Megan started a second lawsuit, accepting an agreement with the breaking off of the relationship between the two parties. On September 4, 2023, Cardi B and Megan announced their new single "Bongos". On November 2, a new single titled "Cobra" was released from her third album. It was her first independent single after departing from her record label 1501 Certified Entertainment in October 2023.

=== 2024–present: Hot Girl Productions, Megan, and Megan: Act II ===
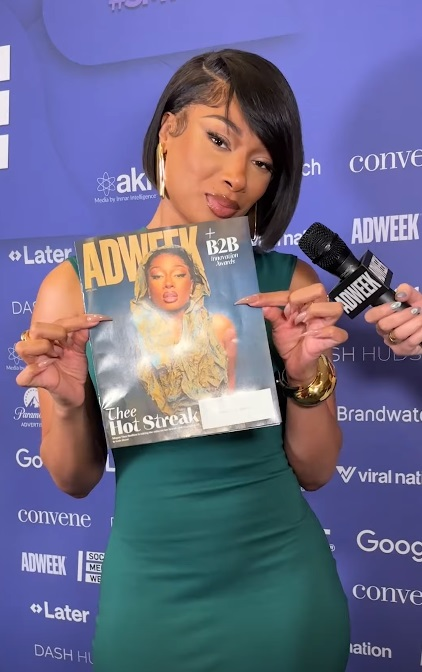
Megan Thee Stallion at Adweek in 2024

Megan appeared on Good Morning America in January 2024 to announce that she would be headlining her first tour, the "Hot Girl Summer Tour". GloRilla served as a special guest for the North American leg, which started on May 14 in Minneapolis. Nigerian-British rapper Ms Banks was an opening act for the European leg. "Hot Girl Summer Tour" garnered rave reviews and grossed over $40 million. On February 2, 2024, Megan signed a distribution deal with Warner Music. On June 28, her self-titled third studio album, Megan was released.

On November 3, 2023, she released three singles in anticipation of the album: "Cobra", "Hiss" on January 26, 2024, and "Boa" on May 10, 2024. "Hiss" reached number one on the Apple Music charts a day after its release, receiving widespread acclaim and media coverage involving multiple artists Megan has dissed in the song. It later debuted atop the Billboard Hot 100, becoming the rapper's third No. 1 hit and her first solo number one. After going viral on TikTok, the music video for the album's fourth single, "Mamushi" featuring Japanese rapper Yuki Chiba, was released on August 9.

On September 5, 2024, the music video for Megan's single "Neva Play" featuring RM of BTS was released. Megan covered English rock band Queen's 1977 hit single "We Will Rock You" in a September 2024 Pepsi television advertisement; on September 5, 2024, the song, sampling the original chorus, was released as a single. Queen are credited as co-lead artists. On October 25, 2024, a reissue of her album Megan, Megan: Act II was released. The album features guest appearances from Flo Milli, Twice, Spiritbox, and RM. On December 6, 2024, Megan was featured on South Korean girl group Twice's title track "Strategy" from their EP of the same name. On February 28, 2025, Megan was featured on the digital release of "Rapunzel" from Alter Ego, the first studio album by Thai rapper Lisa.

On June 11, 2026, the song "DNA (More Than a Game)", the official anthem of the 2026 FIFA World Cup, was released, which included Megan, Andrea Bocelli, David Guetta, and Ejae. In September 2026, she partnered with Dolly Babe for a remix of Babe's song "Pink Blush", which debuted at #58 on the Billboard Hot 100.

== Artistry ==
=== Public image ===
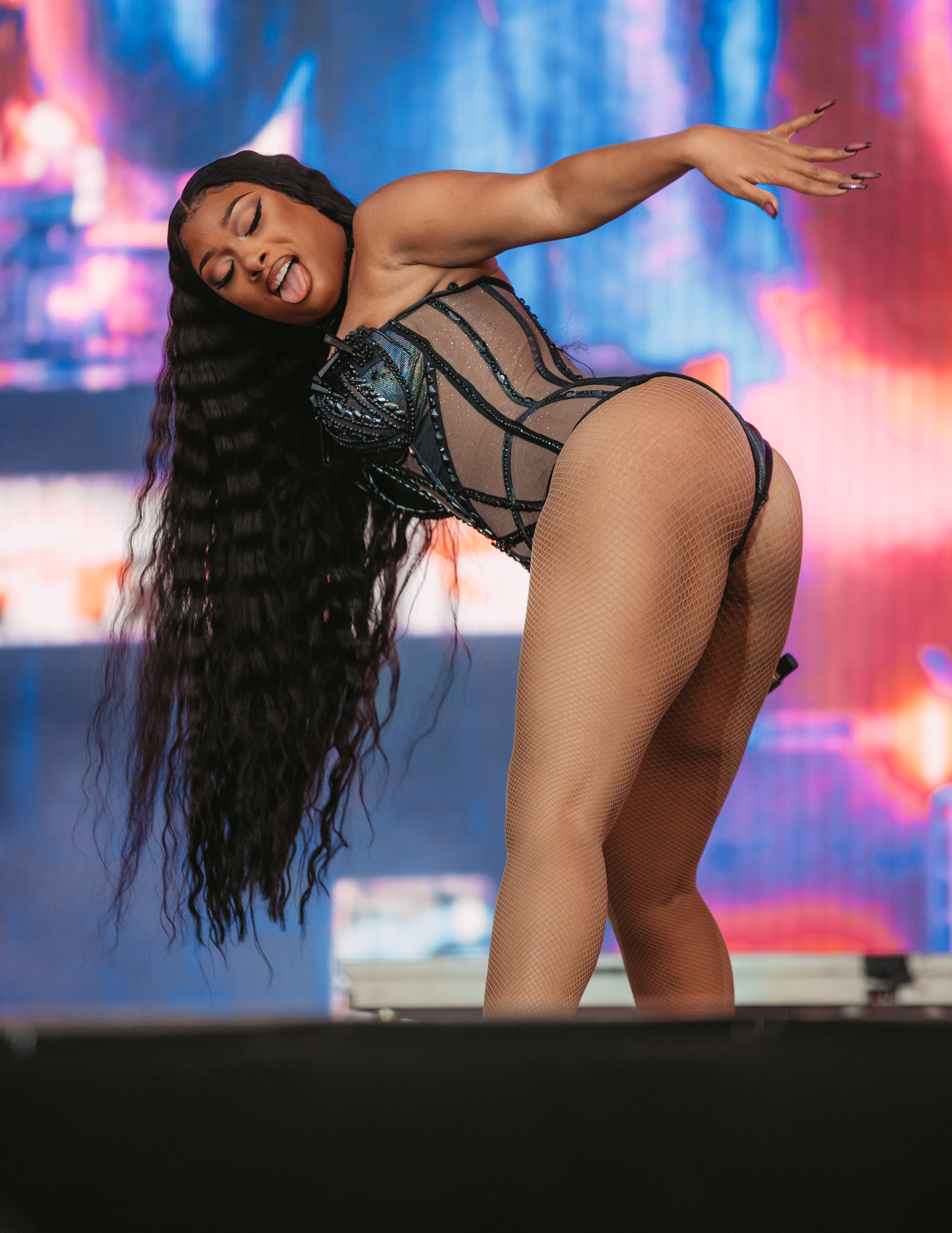
Megan Thee Stallion performing in 2022

Megan Thee Stallion is known for weaving her sexuality into her lyrics, videos, and live performances. In an interview with Pitchfork she stated, "It's not just about being sexy, it's about being confident and me being confident in my sexuality." Her Texas rap origins are an important part of her identity, she told Rolling Stone, "I don't feel like we ever really had a female rapper come from Houston or Texas and shut shit down. So that's where I'm coming from." Some journalists opine that she is a sex symbol.

==== "Hot Girl Summer" ====
Megan Thee Stallion originated the viral catchphrase "hot girl summer" on social media. It is a derivative of another of her most-known catchphrases, "hot girl", also derived from "real hot girl shit". She first used the phrase in a tweet on April 14, 2018. It later appeared on the Fever album cover, which read: "She's thee HOT GIRL and she's bringing THEE HEAT." She defined the term as "women and men being unapologetically them, just having a good-ass time, hyping up their friends, doing you." Megan officially trademarked the term "hot girl summer" in September 2019 after applying for it in July of that year. A song of the same name was released on August 9, 2019. She released the Hot Girl Summer Eau de Parfum in July 2026, developed in collaboration with beauty company Coty.

==== Tongue-out ad-lib ====
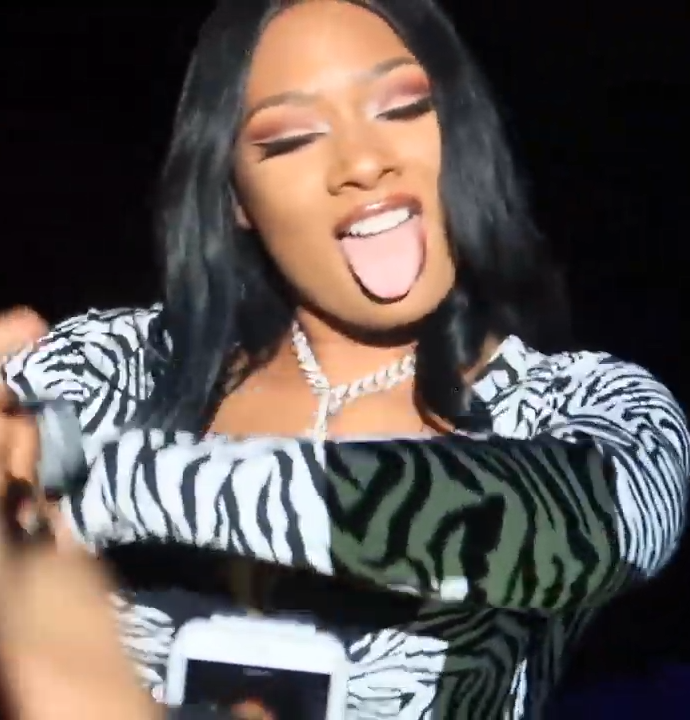
Megan Thee Stallion (shown in 2019) doing her signature ad-lib

Megan is known for her signature ad-lib, which involves sticking her tongue out, creating a "creaky", audible "agh" or "blah" sound. In August 2019, Twitter created an official emoji for this tongue symbol, which could be spawned directly after the hashtag "#MeganTheeStallion". This symbol also inspired the cover art of her EP Suga which was revealed in March 2020.

==== Alter egos ====
Megan Thee Stallion uses alter egos to express different facets of her personality in music. "Tina Snow," one of her alter egos and also the name of her debut EP was influenced by Pimp C's alias Tony Snow. The ego has similar confidence and an unapologetically sexually dominant delivery. "Hot Girl Meg", another alter ego embodies Megan's carefree and outgoing side, which she compares to a "college, party girl." She first introduced "Hot Girl Meg" on her EP, Fever. She has also referred to herself as "Thee Hood Tyra Banks."

=== Influences ===
Megan Thee Stallion cites her mother as her primary influence along notable hip-hop figures like Pimp C. His 2006 solo album, Pimpalation, influenced her style for his talk-rap delivery and "cockiness". Other influences include the Notorious B.I.G., Lil' Kim, Queen Latifah, Eve, Three 6 Mafia, Trina, Salt-N-Pepa, Missy Elliott, and Foxy Brown. She credits Q-Tip as her mentor.

She has also been influenced by Beyoncé. In her Grammy Awards acceptance speech with Beyoncé for "Savage", she said: "Ever since I was little, I was like, 'you know what? One day, I'm gonna grow up and I'm gonna be like the rap Beyoncé.' That was definitely my goal. [...] I love her work ethic, I love the way she is, I love the way she carries herself." In 2019, she told Billboard that she watches old Beyoncé interviews when she is feeling down or unsure if she is making a right decision.

== Other ventures ==
On July 30, 2024, Megan Thee Stallion and fellow rapper Quavo opened up for a Kamala Harris presidential campaign rally in Atlanta, Georgia. She released the Hot Girl Summer Eau de Parfum in July 2026, developed in collaboration with beauty company Coty.

=== Television and film ===
In 2020, Megan Thee Stallion appeared as a judge on the premiere season of HBO's ballroom and voguing competition series Legendary. She would continue appearing as a judge for the series' second season in 2021, before being replaced by Keke Palmer, in the third and final season, due to scheduling and contractual agreements. On December 16, 2021, she signed an exclusive first-look deal at Netflix, to create and executive produce new series and other projects.

On February 17, 2022, it was announced that Megan will co-star in A24's first movie musical titled Dicks: The Musical, described as "a spin on The Parent Trap". The A24 musical film directed by Larry Charles was based on the off-Broadway musical Fucking Identical Twins by Josh Sharp and Aaron Jackson debuted at the 2023 Toronto International Film Festival. She co-stars alongside Nathan Lane, Bowen Yang, and Megan Mullally. She guest starred in the Disney+ Marvel Cinematic Universe series She-Hulk: Attorney at Law as a fictionalized version of herself.

On March 24, 2022, TIME Studios and Roc Nation announced plans to partner in producing a documentary series focused on Megan's life and career. Executive producers on the project included TIME Studios' Ian Orefice, Loren Hammonds, Alexa Conway and Mike Beck; Roc Nation's Desiree Perez and Lori York; and film director Nneka Onuorah. The docuseries, Megan Thee Stallion: In Her Words, was released October 31, 2024, as part of Megan's debut on Amazon Prime Video.

In January 2024, Megan made a cameo appearance in the movie musical adaptation of Mean Girls; she also contributed to its soundtrack, writing the original song "Not My Fault" with Reneé Rapp. Megan has also been the host for the 2024 MTV Video Music Awards on September 11. On May 30, 2025, she announced an anime series in collaboration with The Boondocks producer Carl Jones. In August 2025, Megan starred in the Apple TV+ music competition series KPopped, on which she also served as an executive producer.

=== Philanthropy ===
She contributed $15,400 worth of Thanksgiving turkeys and helped hand them out to 1,050 households in need at the Houston Food Bank portwall pantry, in November 2019. In April 2020, she donated over $10,000 to bail relief effort for Houston protestors. The same month, Megan Thee Stallion teamed up with Amazon Music to donate to a Nursing Facility in Houston. All the proceeds collected from her collaboration with Beyoncé on the "Savage" remix went to Bread of Life, which helps local Houston communities with COVID-19 relief efforts. The song raised over $2.5 million.

In October 2020, she partnered with Amazon Music's rap rotation and launched the "Don't Stop" scholarship fund that awarded two women of color pursuing associate, bachelor or postgraduate degrees, $10,000 each. In February 2021, she launched "Hotties Helping Houston" with US House Democrat Rep. Sheila Jackson Lee of Texas, the National Association of Christian Churches disaster services, Taraji P. Henson, 300 Entertainment, Maroon 5, Revlon, Mielle Organics, Fashion Nova, and Billie Eilish to help senior citizens and single moms recovering from the area's storm-related devastation.

In March 2021, she collaborated with Fashion Nova for the 'Women on Top" initiative, which gave away $1 million to support female-owned businesses and organizations. The same month, along with Fashion Nova and journalist May Lee, they donated $50,000 after the Atlanta spa shootings to the legal non-profit, Advancing Justice Atlanta.

In June 2021, she offered a full tuition, four-year scholarship to the Roc Nation school of music, sports & entertainment at Long Island University. In June 2021, she partnered with Cash App to make "Investing for Hotties" educational videos. This partnership also donated $1 million worth of stock to randomly-selected fans.

In October 2021, as part of her wide-ranging agreement with Popeyes, she made a six-figure donation to the charitable organization Houston Random Acts of Kindness.

On February 15, 2022, Megan launched a nonprofit program, the Pete and Thomas Foundation, in honor of her late mother and father Holly Thomas and Joseph Pete Jr. The foundation seeks to help underserved communities in Houston, Texas and beyond through education, housing, and health and wellness needs. On May 1, 2022, the Mayor of Houston Sylvester Turner honored Megan for her philanthropic and humanitarian efforts for the Houston people by proclaiming May 2 Megan Thee Stallion Day in Houston, Texas. She received an honorary key to the City of Houston, a symbolic cowboy hat and belt buckle.

Following the release of the remix of "Butter" with BTS, the group's fanbase, known as ARMY, launched "Thee Army Fund" project in collaboration with Megan's fans, the "Hotties", which raised over $120,000 to donate to three different organizations in her name: Women for Afghan Women, Black Women of Wellness, and Houston Food Bank. As part of her ceremony to receive the key to the city of Houston, her non-profit the Pete and Thomas Foundation donated $5,000 to three people in Houston to assist with their education, housing, and wellness expenses.

=== Musical theatre ===
On March 24, 2026, she made her Broadway debut replacing Bob the Drag Queen as Zidler in the stage musical Moulin Rouge! The Musical. She's set to perform in the production for a limited engagement through May 17, 2026.

== Personal life ==
Megan Thee Stallion has mentioned being part Creole in her songs "Cocky AF" and "Freak Nasty" as well as in a tweet in September 2017.

Megan's mother, Holly Thomas, died in March 2019 after a long battle with brain cancer; her great-grandmother also died the same month. In addition to acting as her manager, Megan's mother was a major influence on her decision to study health administration and also helped foster her goal to one day establish assisted living facilities in her hometown of Houston. She mentions her mother's death in the song "Flip Flop" on her 2022 album, Traumazine. In January 2024, the location of Thomas' grave was doxed by fans of Nicki Minaj before the release of Minaj's single "Big Foot".

Megan is a self-described fan of anime and her favorites are My Hero Academia and Naruto. Manga artist Shōta Noguchi, who assists My Hero Academia creator Kōhei Horikoshi, has published several renditions of MHA character Rumi Usagiyama using Instagram photos of Megan as reference. In turn, Megan published photos of her 2022 Halloween costume of Usagiyama. She has previously cosplayed as the MHA character Shoto Todoroki as well as the Sailor Moon character Usagi Tsukino.

Megan confirmed her relationship with fellow rapper Pardison Fontaine via Instagram Live on February 19, 2021. The pair ended their relationship in 2023. She was later involved with soccer player Romelu Lukaku and basketball player Torrey Craig.

In July 2025, she confirmed that she was in a relationship with basketball player Klay Thompson. On April 25, 2026, Megan announced that she had broken up with Thompson, accusing him of infidelity.

While she has never publicly stated a particular label for her sexuality, she has continually expressed interest in women through her music.

=== Shooting ===
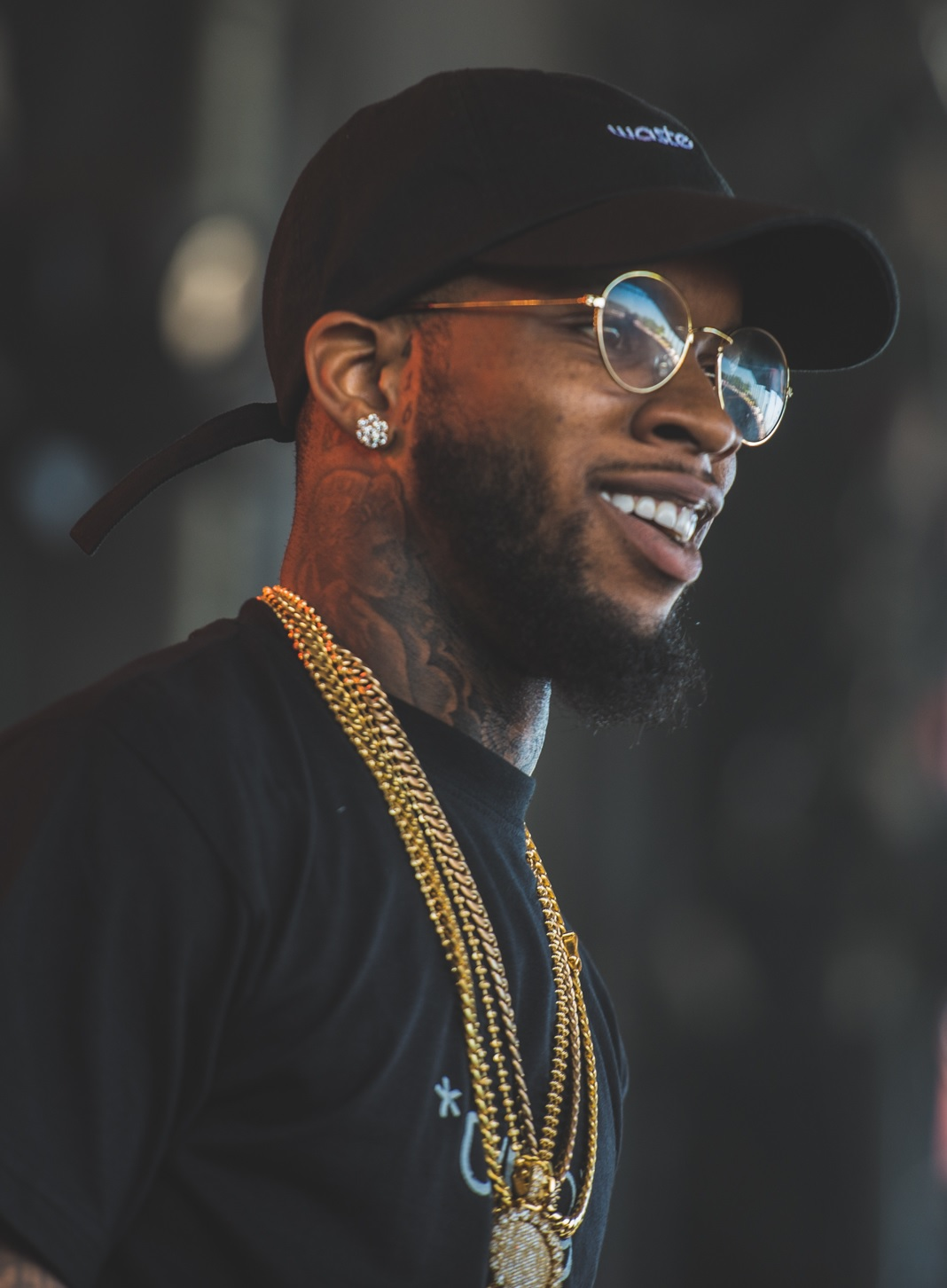
Tory Lanez, pictured in 2016

On July 15, 2020, Megan Thee Stallion stated that she had suffered gunshot wounds, and that she had undergone surgery to remove the bullets. Her statement countered an earlier TMZ report that she had injured her foot on broken glass three days prior when she was in a car with rap and R&B musician Tory Lanez (Daystar Peterson) and an unidentified woman. The car was pulled over by police, and Lanez was arrested on gun charges following a vehicle search.

On July 27, 2020, Megan revealed that she had been shot in both feet, and denounced rumors in an Instagram Live session where she tearfully recounted the shooting incident. The following month, Megan claimed that Lanez was the person who shot her, saying, "I didn't tell the police what happened immediately right there because I didn't want to die." In a statement to Variety, Megan's attorney, Alex Spiro, claimed Lanez's representatives had attempted to launch a "smear campaign", using falsified messages to "peddle a false narrative" discrediting Megan. Lanez's team denied this, stating that they would investigate whoever was behind the fake emails, then would take appropriate action. Megan later confirmed that she had been offered money by Lanez and his team to keep quiet on the incident.

On October 8, 2020, Lanez was charged with shooting Megan by Los Angeles County prosecutors. His arraignment was scheduled on October 13; however, it was rescheduled for November 18 after Lanez's attorney requested a continuance. Megan was issued a protection order against Lanez, directing him to stay at least 100 yards (91 m) away from her, and to not contact her. He was also ordered to surrender any guns he owns. In an op-ed for The New York Times, published on October 13, 2020, Megan addressed the shooting allegation further, writing, "Black women are still constantly disrespected and disregarded in so many areas of life. I was recently the victim of an act of violence by a man. After a party, I was shot twice as I walked away from him. We were not in a relationship. Truthfully, I was shocked that I ended up in that place."

In April 2022, Lanez was arrested for violating the protection order relating to the case; and he was released shortly after on an increased bond of $350,000. On December 13, 2022, Megan testified in Lanez's assault trial and stated that she "wish[ed Tory] would have just shot and killed me." On December 23, 2022, a jury convicted Lanez on three felony charges stemming from the shooting: assault with a semiautomatic handgun, having a loaded and unregistered firearm in a vehicle, and gross negligence in discharging his firearm. On August 8, 2023, Tory Lanez was sentenced to 10 years in prison for the shooting.

=== Legal disputes ===
In 2015, Megan Thee Stallion was arrested on assault charges after an incident with her ex-boyfriend at SXSW. According to Megan, she found out her boyfriend had cheated and had a baby with another woman, and that when she confronted him about it, he started "pulling and pushing" her, and she started punching him. The charges against Megan were dismissed in April 2016 after her ex-boyfriend failed to appear in court.

In April 2024, Megan was sued for harassment and creating a "hostile, abusive work environment" by her former cameraman Emilio Garcia, who worked for her from July 2018 to June 2023. Megan denied the allegations.

On October 30, 2024, Megan filed a lawsuit against blogger Milagro Cooper for alleged harassment and "churning out falsehoods" on behalf of Tory Lanez surrounding his assault on her via firearm.

=== Lawsuit and departure from 1501 Certified Entertainment ===
In 2020, Megan Thee Stallion filed suit against her record label 1501 Certified Entertainment to renegotiate her contract, after her management company Roc Nation found it "iffy". She started the hashtag "#FreeTheeStallion" to raise awareness of the issue, noting that "[she did not] understand some of the verbiage" when she signed the initial contract with 1501. On March 6, 2020, she released the EP, Suga, against the wishes of 1501, after a judge granted a temporary restraining order against the label.

When Megan published Something for Thee Hotties in 2021, the record label did not recognize it as an album, because it has 29 minutes of new material instead of 45, so the rapper would still have to release two more albums in addition to Something in order to fulfill her contractual obligations. On February 18, 2022, Megan filed suit against the label claiming that Something respects the definition of an album with at least 45 minutes of material.

On August 12, 2022, in the announcement for the release of her second studio album Traumazine, she wrote about the lawsuit, expressing her disappointment and emotional distress she is experiencing due to the difficulty in releasing her music, but ending her message to fans with the phrase "we almost out". The week after the album's release, the rapper filed a new complaint, seeking recognition of her performance under the contract, and also asking for $1 million in damages. The label's law firm stated that Megan would be summoned for an in-person deposition in mid-October, and that a ruling would be issued by May 2023. On October 19, 2023, attorneys for 1501 Certified Entertainment confirmed that "Megan Thee Stallion and 1501 Certified are pleased to announce that they have mutually reached a confidential settlement to resolve their legal differences, [...] As part of the arrangement, both parties have agreed to amicably part ways".

Shortly after the legal proceedings ended, Megan founded the independent music and entertainment company Hot Girl Productions. On February 2, 2024, Megan signed a distribution deal with Warner Music Group (WMG); her masters and publishing will be released through Hot Girl.

== Discography ==
Albums

- Good News (2020)
- Traumazine (2022)
- Megan (2024)

== Filmography ==
=== Film ===
Year	Title	Role	Notes	Ref.
2023	Dicks: The Musical	Gloria		
2023	Renaissance: A Film by Beyoncé	Herself		
2024	Mean Girls	Herself	Cameo appearance	
2024	Megan Thee Stallion: In Her Words	Herself		
2026	Roommates	Louise		

=== Television ===
Year	Title	Role	Notes
2019	Jimmy Kimmel Live!	Musical guest	Episode: "Tracy Morgan/Gwen Stefani/Megan Thee Stallion"
2020	Saturday Night Live	Musical guest	Episode: "Chris Rock/Megan Thee Stallion"
2020	Good Girls	Onyx	Episode: "Nana"
2020–21	Legendary	Herself	Judge (Season 1–2)
2022	P-Valley	Tina Snow (alter ego)	Guest star (Season 2)
2022	Cardi Tries	Herself	Episode: "Cardi Tries Football"
2022	Gutsy	Herself	Episode: "Gutsy Women Refuse Hate"
2022	She-Hulk: Attorney at Law	Herself	Episode: "The People vs. Emil Blonsky"
2022	Saturday Night Live	Host/Musical guest	Episode: "Megan Thee Stallion/Megan Thee Stallion"
2023	Big Mouth	Megan	Guest star (Season 7)
2024	Saturday Night Live	Guest performer	Episode: "Jacob Elordi/Reneé Rapp"
2025	KPopped	Host/Musical Guest	Executive Producer of Eight-Episode Apple TV+ Competition Series.
2025	Celebrity Family Feud	Herself	Episode: "Megan Thee Stallion vs Ne-Yo and NFL vs Olympians"
2026	The Fall and Rise of Reggie Dinkins	Denise	Guest star (Season 1)
TBA	Hotties		
TBA	Baywatch		

=== Stage ===
Year	Title	Role	Venue	Notes
2026	Moulin Rouge!	Zidler	Al Hirschfeld Theatre (Broadway)	

== Tours ==
Headlining

- Hot Girl Summer Tour (2024)

Supporting

- Legendary Nights Tour (for Meek Mill and Future) (2019)
- Future Nostalgia Tour (for Dua Lipa) (2022)

== See also ==
- List of artists who reached number one in the United States
- Southern hip hop
- List of YouTubers
