= Body (Megan Thee Stallion song) =

2020 single by Megan Thee Stallion

- Joel Corry remix cover

Single by Megan Thee Stallion

from the album Good News
- Released: November 20, 2020
- Recorded: 2020
- Genre: Hip hop; dirty rap
- Length: 2:51
- Label: 1501 Certified; 300
- Composers: Julian Mason; Christophe Petrel
- Lyricist: Megan Pete
- Producer: LilJuMadeDaBeat

Megan Thee Stallion singles chronology
"Thick" (remix) (2020)	"Body" (2020)	"34+35" (remix) (2021)

Music video
- "Body" on YouTube

"Body" is a song by American rapper-songwriter Megan Thee Stallion, who wrote the song during the COVID-19 quarantine and was inspired by her own figure during the creative process, with additional concentration on sizes of waist and breasts. It was released on November 20, 2020, by 1501 Certified Entertainment and 300 Entertainment as the third single from her debut studio album Good News (2020). It coincided with the release of the album and was supported by a music video featuring cameo appearances from Taraji P. Henson, Blac Chyna, and Jordyn Woods, among others.

"Body" received positive reviews from critics, who praised its lyrics for being body-positive and empowering for women. It peaked at number twelve on the US Billboard Hot 100 and topped the component Streaming Songs chart, where it made Megan Thee Stallion the first woman in history to achieve three number-one songs in a single year. A remix of the song by British DJ Joel Corry was released on January 29, 2021.

== Composition and lyrics ==
"Body" is an up-tempo "erotic" song, containing an "NSFW-like" sample of a woman sexually moaning in an unknown pornographic film as well as "huge drums" and "thick synth bass lines". Lyrically, Megan brags about her desirability, being the envy of other women and the fantasy of their men. The chorus primarily features the rapper consistently repeating "body-ody-ody-ody". The verses incorporate Megan Thee Stallion's signature "raunchy" lyrics containing sex appeal. She stated that she was inspired to write "Body" while she was appreciating her body during the COVID-19 pandemic at the time of the song's release, stating, "I'm like walking around the living room, freestyling, and appreciating my quarantine body 'cause I feel like I got a little fluffy and thick, and I was like, 'Baby, I still look good'". She revealed on The Late Show with Stephen Colbert that the song was aimed at celebrating body positivity in "all bodies". The term body-ody-ody derives from Drag Race terminology, with the song eventually being used in a lip sync between queens Morphine Love Dion and Dawn on season 16 of the show.

== Critical reception ==
Earmilk's Kalen Murphy called "Body" a "bawdy track where Megan reclaims full control of her sex appeal and sells temptation like none other". Critics from Nylon described the track as "a crisp three minutes of bouncy beats and self-confident lyrics" which "embodies Meg's no-fucks-given attitude in the best way". Carl Lamarre of Billboard wrote that Megan Thee Stallion "salutes curvy women on this body-positive record", while describing it as a "Twerk-worthy bop". Brooklyn White of Essence also agreed that the rapper "continues her mission of empowering women of all different kinds to be confident in their own skin".

Reviewing the song's parent album, Alexis Petridis of The Guardian praised Megan for her "lyrics teeming with sharp and funny lines" throughout the album while referring to a line from "Body": "all them bitches scary cats, I call them Carole Baskin". In this line in particular, the rapper refers to Baskin, an animal rights activist famous for her appearance on the Netflix show Tiger King, who had previously criticised the use of big cats as props in her and rapper Cardi B's music video for "WAP".

== Commercial performance ==
In the United States, "Body" debuted at number twelve on the Billboard Hot 100 chart dated December 5, 2020. It debuted at number one on the component Streaming Songs chart with 22.5 million U.S. streams in the tracking week of November 20-26. It marked her third number-one single on the chart, following "Savage Remix" featuring Beyoncé and her feature on Cardi B's single “WAP,” both of which were released in 2020. With this, Megan Thee Stallion entered a six-way tie for the fifth-most leaders in Streaming Songs' history, alongside Ariana Grande, Cardi B, Juice Wrld, Lil Baby and Miley Cyrus. She also became the first woman and only the second artist after Drake to achieve three number-one singles in a calendar year.

== Live performances ==
Megan Thee Stallion performed "Body" for the first time at the 2020 American Music Awards. She performed a medley of "Body" and "Savage Remix" on the 848th episode of The Late Late Show with James Corden in December 2020. "Body" was also performed at the 63rd Annual Grammy Awards on March 14, 2021.

Before performing "Body" in her Glastonbury Festival 2022 set, Megan called out the U.S. Supreme Court for overturning Roe v. Wade and her home state of Texas for prohibiting abortion, before encouraging the audience to join her in chanting "My body, my motherfucking choice!" Meghan Thee Stallion performed clean versions of "Body", "Girls in the Hood", "Mamushi", and "Savage", at a rally for 2024 United States presidential election candidate Kamala Harris on July 31, 2024. She also endorsed Harris by coining the phrase "Hotties for Harris".

== TikTok challenges ==
Similar to her song "Savage" which gained popularity through a viral dance challenge on the video-sharing platform TikTok, Megan Thee Stallion chose to promote "Body" in the same way. Unlike the dance for "Savage" which was choreographed by TikTok user Keara Wilson, Megan Thee Stallion and choreographer JaQuel Knight self-originated the #BodyChallenge dance, which is also performed in the song's music video. There was also a TikTok trend where a mashup of Adele's "Water Under the Bridge" and "Body" was used along with footage from her 2020 American Music Awards performance to create a dance, auditioning to be one of "Adele's backup dancers". In a separate trend, TikTok users would also use the "Body" audio to exhibit their own bodies and promote body confidence.

== Music video ==
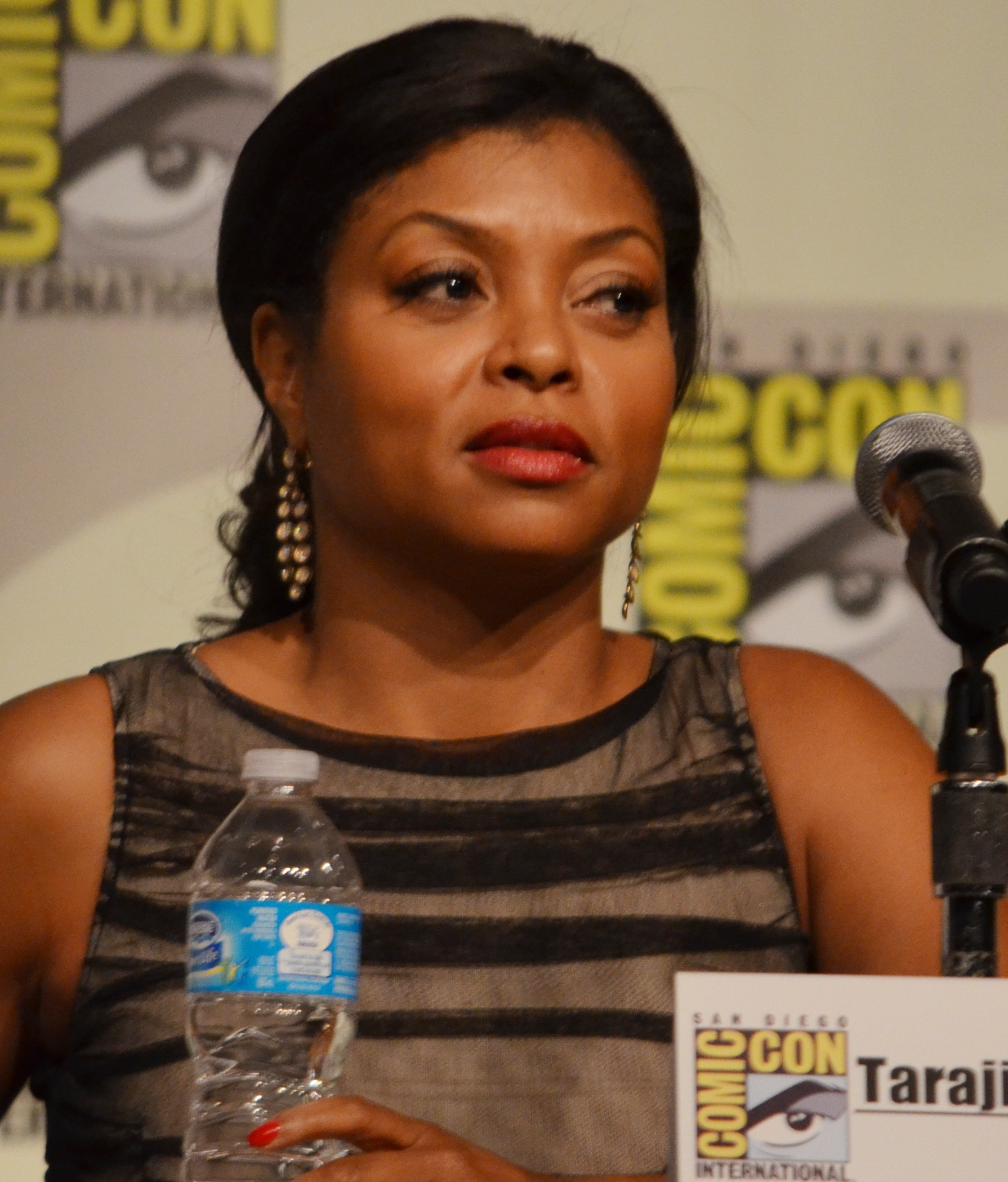
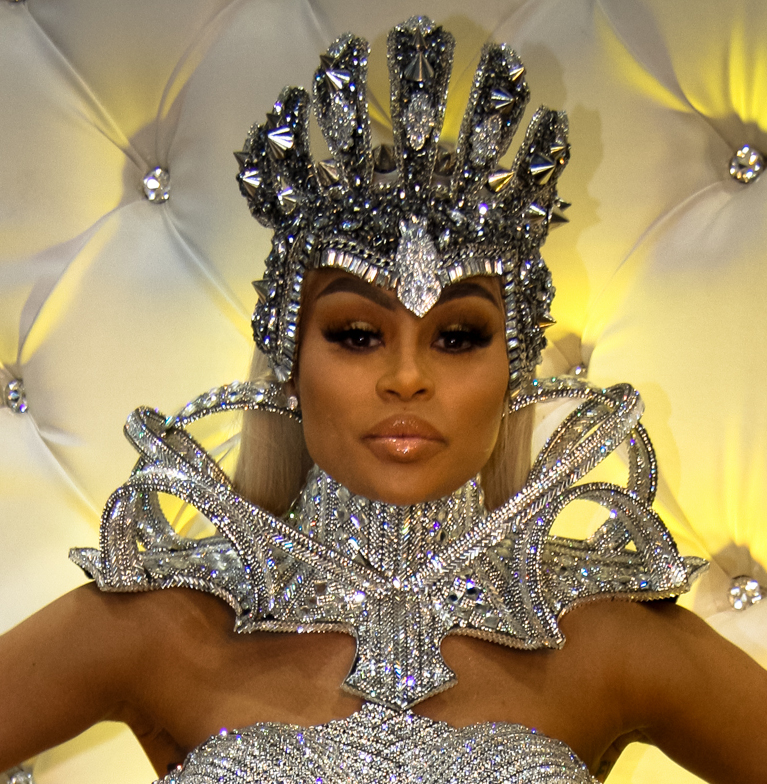
Taraji P. Henson (left) and Blac Chyna (right) both make cameo appearances in the music video.

The music video for "Body" was directed by Colin Tilley and features choreography from both Megan Thee Stallion and choreographer JaQuel Knight. It was released alongside both the song and album on November 20, 2020. Megan Thee Stallion engaged in a livestream premiere for the song's music video as part of the YouTube Originals' Released series. At the premiere, she told fans, "You're going to see all body shapes, a lot of strong women doing the damn thing. Just being confident and owning their bodies and their sexuality". Celebrities who make cameo appearances in the music video for "Body" include Taraji P. Henson, Blac Chyna, Jordyn Woods, Maliibu Miitch, Asian Da Brat, and Tabria Majors. Throughout the video, the women "confidently groove on a futuristic set and on a spotlit stage". Various fashion publications praised the outfits worn in the video. Megan Thee Stallion initially wears a black, mesh body suit which emphasizes her curves, as well as "an oversized coat with a bedazzled bodice with nothing underneath".

The video later made an appearance in the music video for another one of Megan's songs, "Thot Shit".

== Charts ==
=== Weekly charts ===
Weekly chart performance for "Body"
Chart (2020–2021)	Peak position
Australia (ARIA)	57
Canada Hot 100 (Billboard)	43
Global 200 (Billboard)	27
Greece International (IFPI)	41
Ireland (IRMA)	37
New Zealand Hot Singles (RMNZ)	5
Paraguay (SGP)	84
UK Singles (Official Charts)	44
UK Hip Hop/R&B (Official Charts)	22
US Billboard Hot 100	12
US Hot R&B/Hip-Hop Songs (Billboard)	4
US R&B/Hip-Hop Airplay (Billboard)	3
US Pop Airplay (Billboard)	20
US Rhythmic Airplay (Billboard)	1

=== Year-end charts ===
Year-end chart performance for "Body"
Chart (2021)	Position
Global 200 (Billboard)	164
US Billboard Hot 100	54
US Hot R&B/Hip-Hop Songs (Billboard)	22
US Rhythmic (Billboard)	17

== Certifications ==
Certifications for "Body"
Region	Certification	Certified units/sales
Brazil (Pro-Música Brasil)	Platinum	40,000^{‡}
Canada (Music Canada)	2× Platinum	160,000^{‡}
New Zealand (RMNZ)	Platinum	30,000^{‡}
United Kingdom (BPI)	Silver	200,000^{‡}
United States (RIAA)	3× Platinum	3,000,000^{‡}
^{‡} Sales+streaming figures based on certification alone.
