= Something for Thee Hotties =

Compilation album by Megan Thee Stallion
- Released: October 29, 2021
- Recorded: 2019–October 2021
- Length: 44:38
- Labels: 1501 Certified; 300
- Producers: BoogzDaBeast; Buddah Bless; FnZ; Hit Kidd; J.R. Rotem; Juicy J; LilJuMadeDaBeat; Lil Tag; Megan Thee Stallion; Murda Beatz; OG Parker; Romano; Sean Island; TGUT

Megan Thee Stallion chronology
Good News (2020)	Something for Thee Hotties (2021)	Traumazine (2022)

Singles from Something for Thee Hotties
- 1. "Thot Shit" Released: June 11, 2021; 2. "Megan's Piano" Released: November 30, 2021

Professional ratings
Review scores
Source	Rating
AllMusic	3.5/5 stars
Pitchfork	7.4/10
Rolling Stone	3/5 stars

Something for Thee Hotties (co-titled From Thee Archives) is a compilation album by American rapper-songwriter Megan Thee Stallion. It was released on October 29, 2021, by 300 Entertainment and 1501 Certified Entertainment as a "thank you" gift to Megan's fanbase. The compilation serves as a collection of some of her previously released YouTube freestyles, as well as previously unreleased archival songs; with the only guest appearances Juicy J, VickeeLo and Dino BTW contributing skits. It also includes "Thot Shit", which was released as a single in June that year. The compilation was produced primarily by LilJuMadeDaBeat, with external contributions from a variety of producers including Juicy J, Murda Beatz, and J.R. Rotem, among others.

The compilation debuted at number five on the US Billboard 200, becoming Megan Thee Stallion's fourth top-10 album.

== Background ==
On October 21, 2021, Megan Thee Stallion announced the compilation as her gift to her fanbase she calls "Hotties", saying that the project would feature some of the YouTube freestyles her fans were asking for, as well as unreleased songs from her archives. The original tracklist was then revealed on October 27, initially featuring fifteen tracks including the previously released single "Thot Shit". The tracklist was then updated under an hour prior to the compilation's intended midnight release, featuring 5 more tracks including "Warning", "Kitty Kat" and skits performed by Juicy J, VickeeLo and Dino BTW. The compilation was delayed by a few hours, eventually being released at 8am on the scheduled date.

In a Twitter Q&A shortly after the compilation's release, Megan revealed that majority of the songs on the compilation were recorded throughout 2021. Some of the most recent songs were recorded a few weeks prior to the compilation's release; and the oldest songs recorded were the Tidal Bless the Booth freestyle from 2019, as well as "Bae Goals".

== Lawsuit ==
1501 Certified did not recognize it as an album, claiming the project's 44:38 of material is less than the 45 minutes stipulated in the rapper's recording contract, including 29 minutes of new material. Along with the disallowance of the project, the rapper would have to release two more albums in addition to Something. On February 18, 2022, the rapper took legal action against the label claiming that Something meets the definition of an album.

== Track listing ==
Something for Thee Hotties track listing
No.	Title	Writer(s)	Producer(s)	Length
1.	"Tuned In Freestyle"	Megan Pete; Terence "Romano" Williams; Jordan Houston	Romano; Juicy J	2:03
2.	"Megan Monday Freestyle"	Pete; Julian "LilJuMadeDaBeat" Mason	LilJuMadeDaBeat	1:53
3.	"Trippy Skit" (featuring Juicy J)	Houston		1:12
4.	"Southside Forever Freestyle"	Pete; Mason; Houston	LilJuMadeDaBeat; Juicy J	2:57
5.	"Outta Town Freestyle"	Pete; Mason	LilJuMadeDaBeat	1:20
6.	"Megan's Piano"	Pete; Mason	Megan Thee Stallion; LilJuMadeDaBeat	1:53
7.	"VickeeLo and Dino BTW Skit"	Victoria "VickeeLo" Phillips; Darrielle "Dino" Simmons		1:02
8.	"Eat It"	Pete; Jahmal "BoogzDaBeast" Gwin; Michael Mulé; Isaac Deboni; Shane Lindstrom; Joshua Parker	BoogzDaBeast; FnZ; Murda Beatz; OG Parker	2:25
9.	"All of It"	Pete; Tyron Douglas	Buddah Bless; Lil Tag	1:53
10.	"Warning"	Pete; Anthony "HitKidd" Holmes	HitKidd	2:34
11.	"Kitty Kat"	Pete; Jonathan Rotem	J.R. Rotem	2:05
12.	"Tina Snow Interlude"	Pete; Mason	LilJuMadeDaBeat	3:04
13.	"God's Favorite"	Pete; Holmes	HitKidd	1:30
14.	"Let Me See It"	Pete; Williams; Parker	Romano; OG Parker	3:09
15.	"Opposite Day"	Pete; Holmes	HitKidd	2:14
16.	"Freakend"	Pete; Matthew "Sean Island" Allen	Sean Island	1:54
17.	"Bae Goals"	Pete; Douglas	Buddah Bless	2:28
18.	"Pipe Up"	Pete; Houston	Juicy J	2:49
19.	"Bless the Booth Freestyle"	Pete; Taylor "TGUT" Guttenberg	TGUT	2:06
20.	"Thot Shit"	Pete; Mason; Parker	LilJuMadeDaBeat; OG Parker	3:04
21.	"To Thee Hotties"	Pete		0:53
Total length:				44:38

== Singles ==
"Thot Shit" was released as the lead single from the compilation, on June 11, 2021. It debuted in the Top-20 of the Billboard Hot 100 chart. The second and final single "Megan's Piano" was released on November 30, 2021, and charted at number 97 on the Billboard Hot 100.

== Charts ==
Chart performance for Something for Thee Hotties
Chart (2021)	Peak position
Canadian Albums (Billboard)	69
US Billboard 200	5
US Top R&B/Hip-Hop Albums (Billboard)	3

== Certifications ==
Certifications and sales for Something for Thee Hotties
Region	Certification	Certified units/sales
United States (RIAA)	Gold	500,000^{‡}
^{‡} Sales+streaming figures based on certification alone.
