= Tina Snow =

EP by Megan Thee Stallion
- Released: June 8, 2018
- Length: 30:16
- Label: 1501 Certified; 300 (Warner)
- Producer: DJ Chose; LilJuMadeDaBeat; MCV; P Crisco; RamyOnTheBeat

Megan Thee Stallion chronology
Make It Hot (2017)	Tina Snow (2018)	Fever (2019)

Singles from Tina Snow
- 1. "Cocky AF" Released: February 12, 2018; 2. "Big Ole Freak" Released: January 22, 2019

Professional ratings
Review scores
Source	Rating
AllMusic	3.5/5 stars

Tina Snow is the second extended play by American rapper Megan Thee Stallion. It was released on June 8, 2018, by 1501 Certified Entertainment and 300 Entertainment. It features the single "Big Ole Freak", her first entry on the US Billboard Hot 100. The alter ego "Tina Snow" was inspired by Pimp C's alter ego "Tony Snow".

== Track listing ==
Tina Snow
No.	Title	Producer(s)	Length
1.	"WTF I Want"	DJ Chose	2:17
2.	"Hot Girl"	DJ Chose; P Crisco	3:16
3.	"Good At"	MCV	3:50
4.	"Freak Nasty"	LilJuMadeDaBeat	2:53
5.	"Cognac Queen"	MCV	3:42
6.	"Neva"	LilJuMadeDaBeat	2:35
7.	"Big Ole Freak"	LilJuMadeDaBeat	3:34
8.	"Tina Montana"	LilJuMadeDaBeat	2:51
9.	"Make a Bag" (featuring Moneybagg Yo)	LilJuMadeDaBeat; RamyOnTheBeat	2:16
10.	"Cocky AF"	DJ Chose	2:57
Total length:			30:16

== Charts ==
Chart (2019)	Peak position
US Billboard 200	166

== Certifications ==
Region	Certification	Certified units/sales
United States (RIAA)	Gold	500,000^{‡}
^{‡} Sales+streaming figures based on certification alone.
