= Big Ole Freak =

2019 single by Megan Thee Stallion

Single by Megan Thee Stallion

from the EP Tina Snow
- Released: January 22, 2019
- Recorded: 2018
- Genre: Dirty rap
- Length: 3:34
- Label: 300
- Composers: Marquis Dair; Julian Mason
- Lyricist: Megan Thee Stallion
- Producer: LilJuMadeDaBeat

Megan Thee Stallion singles chronology
"Cocky AF" (2018)	"Big Ole Freak" (2019)	"Sex Talk" (2019)

Official video
- "Big Ole Freak" on YouTube

"Big Ole Freak" is a song by American rapper and songwriter Megan Thee Stallion. It was released to US rhythmic contemporary radio on January 22, 2019, as a single from her 2018 EP Tina Snow. It hit at number 99 on the US Billboard Hot 100, before ascending to number 65, becoming Megan Thee Stallion's first charting song. The single was certified Double Platinum by the RIAA for selling over 2 million units. "Big Ole Freak" has been noted by critics as one of Megan’s breakout songs that jumpstarted her career.

== Background ==
The song samples Immature's song, "Is It Love This Time", from their debut album, On Our Worst Behavior (1992) The song also samples the baseline of Al B. Sure!'s song Nite and Day.

== Critical reception ==
Rolling Stone noted that the song has a "frankly carnal rap" and an "airy melody". Billboard called it a "saucy club banger" with a "thumping melody" and an "unapologetic spirit", and said the "vocally gifted MC has the razor-sharp delivery to potentially lead a new era of hip-hop".

== Music video ==
The music video, directed by Munachi Osegbu, was released in February 2019.

== Charts ==
=== Weekly charts ===
Chart (2019)	Peak position
US Billboard Hot 100	65
US Hot R&B/Hip-Hop Songs (Billboard)	25
US R&B/Hip-Hop Airplay (Billboard)	5
US Rhythmic (Billboard)	21

=== Year-end charts ===
Chart (2019)	Position
US Hot R&B/Hip-Hop Songs (Billboard)	67

== Certifications ==
Region	Certification	Certified units/sales
United States (RIAA)	2× Platinum	2,000,000^{‡}
^{‡} Sales+streaming figures based on certification alone.
