= Cash Shit =

Single by Megan Thee Stallion featuring DaBaby

from the album Fever
- Released: May 17, 2019
- Genre: Hip hop; dirty rap
- Length: 3:12
- Label: 300; 1501 Certified Ent.
- Songwriters: Megan Pete; Jonathan Kirk
- Producer: LilJuMadeDaBeat

Megan Thee Stallion singles chronology
| "Sex Talk" (2019) | "Cash Shit" (2019) | "Hot Girl Summer" (2019) |

DaBaby singles chronology
| "Double or Nothin'" (2019) | "Cash Shit" (2019) | "Did It" (2019) |

"Cash Shit" is a song by American rapper Megan Thee Stallion featuring fellow American rapper DaBaby. It was released on May 17, 2019 as the third single of her debut commercial mixtape, Fever. The track would later peak at number one on Urban radio in the United States, as well as number 36 on the Billboard Hot 100. This song was later featured in the fictional iFruit Radio in Grand Theft Auto V (PS4, Xbox One, PC, PS5 and Xbox Series X/S version).

Billboard magazine ranked "Cash Shit" thirtieth on their 100 Best Songs of 2019 list. Complex named it the eleventh best song of the year, while Pitchfork listed it twelfth on their 100 Best Songs of 2019 list.

== Music and lyrics ==
"Cash Shit" is a hip hop song that features a booming beat. In the intro of the song, Megan raps "Yeah, I'm in my bag, but I'm in his too", a line Pitchfork's Rawiya Kameir labeled as "capitalist-feminism". In Megan's opening verse, she twice "interrupts herself and jumps back a few bars to repeat her punchlines". Complex's Shawn Setaro said the song contains the "best elements from both artists: Megan's humor and in-your-face sexuality, and DaBaby's flowing triplet rhythms and perfectly timed pauses."

== Critical reception ==
"Cash Shit" received acclaim from critics, with many praising Megan Thee Stallion's and DaBaby's verses. The song was given a "VERY HOTTTTT [sic]" rating by Milca P. of HotNewHipHop, and was labeled "an effort laced in impalpable swagger and confidence." Writing for Tiny Mix Tapes, Eli Schoop praised the song as "downright nasty". In a review of Fever by The New York Times, and praised the line "I'm a finesser and I'm a fly dresser/Move to the top floor and flew in my dresser" as "an unlikely image crash landing into a conventional boast". Trent Clark of HipHopDX praised Megan's and DaBaby's performances, saying that the song "highlights why both Southern stars are among the most entertaining rappers out"

The song's production also received praise, with The New York Times calling it "ominous and spacious" and The Fader branding it as "refined".

== Music video ==
Two "much-hyped" music videos were teased, but subsequently abandoned. On July 14, Megan released a trailer via social media (featuring DaBaby) of what appeared to be a trailer for a short film/music video, directed by Hype Williams, titled "Fever Thee Movie". Later in May 2020, Megan confirmed that if her song "Savage" goes number 1 on the Billboard Hot 100, she would drop the video/short film.

== Charts ==
=== Weekly charts ===
| Chart (2019) | Peak position |
|---|---|
| US Billboard Hot 100 | 36 |
| US Hot R&B/Hip-Hop Songs (Billboard) | 16 |
| US R&B/Hip-Hop Airplay (Billboard) | 3 |
| US Rhythmic Airplay (Billboard) | 24 |
| US Rolling Stone Top 100 | 27 |

=== Year-end charts ===
| Chart (2019) | Position |
|---|---|
| US Billboard Hot 100 | 90 |
| US Hot R&B/Hip-Hop Songs (Billboard) | 41 |

== Certifications ==
| Region | Certification | Certified units/sales |
|---|---|---|
| New Zealand (RMNZ) | Gold | 15,000^{‡} |
| United States (RIAA) | 4× Platinum | 4,000,000^{‡} |
^{‡} Sales+streaming figures based on certification alone.
