= Hot Girl Summer =

2019 single by Megan Thee Stallion

Single by Megan Thee Stallion featuring Nicki Minaj and Ty Dolla Sign
- Released: August 9, 2019
- Recorded: July 2019
- Genre: Hip hop; pop rap
- Length: 3:19
- Label: 300
- Composers: Isaac Bynum; Jatavia Johnson; Miles McCollum; Michael Foster; Jordan Houston; Georges Olivier; Syed Hossain
- Lyricists: Megan Pete; Onika Maraj; Tyrone Griffin, Jr.; Derrick Carrington
- Producers: Bone Collector; Juicy J; Crazy Mike; Syed Hossain

Megan Thee Stallion singles chronology
"Sex Talk" (2019)	"Hot Girl Summer" (2019)	"Big Booty" (2019)

Nicki Minaj singles chronology
"Extravagant" (2019)	"Hot Girl Summer" (2019)	"Welcome to the Party (Remix)" (2019)

Ty Dolla Sign singles chronology
"Two Nights Part II" (2019)	"Hot Girl Summer" (2019)	"Hottest In the City" (2019)

Music video
- "Hot Girl Summer" on YouTube

"Hot Girl Summer" is a song by American rapper Megan Thee Stallion featuring Trinidadian rapper Nicki Minaj and American singer Ty Dolla Sign, released on August 9, 2019, by 300 Entertainment. It was written by all three artists alongside Syed Hossain, Derrick Milano, and producers Crazy Mike, Juicy J, & Bone Collector, with additional writing credits going to Earl On The Beat, JT (from City Girls), and Lil Yachty for the sampling of City Girls' 2019 song "Act Up"; the song was produced by Bone Collector, Juicy J, and Crazy Mike and engineered by Irving Gadoury. Commercially, the song debuted and peaked at number eleven on the Billboard Hot 100. On Billboard's Rhythmic Songs airplay chart, it became Megan Thee Stallion's first number one, Nicki Minaj's eighth, and Ty Dolla Sign's third.

== Background ==
In July 2019, the term "hot girl summer" went viral on social media and subsequently became a meme prior to the release of the song. The title originally stems from a line on "Cash Shit" where the rapper calls herself "thee hot girl". The phrase also appeared on the artwork for her 2019 mixtape Fever. Megan first teased the song in a tweet on July 18, stating "I feel like it's only right I drop a hot girl summer song before the summer is over." On July 28, 2019, Megan posted a snippet of the song to her Instagram. She also revealed the release date to be August 2 but it was later postponed to August 9. On August 5, 2019, it was announced that the song would feature Nicki Minaj which turned out to be the cause for the delay. Minaj revealed that the collaboration almost did not happen due to her almost losing her voice.

== Music video ==
On September 3, 2019, the music video for the song was released. Directed by Munachi Osegbu, the video shows the artists at a pool party. Multiple celebrities make cameo appearances, including Agnez Mo, Rico Nasty, Dreezy, La La Anthony, Ari Lennox, Summer Walker, DaniLeigh, Juicy J, and French Montana.

== Live performances ==
Megan performed the song for the first time at the 2019 MTV Video Music Awards, in a medley with "Cash Shit".

== Personnel ==
Credits adapted from Tidal and Jaxsta.

- Megan Thee Stallion – lead vocals
- Nicki Minaj – featured vocals
- Ty Dolla Sign – featured vocals
- Bone Collector – production
- Juicy J – production
- Crazy Mike – production
- Irving Gadoury - recording engineer

== Awards and nominations ==
Year	Ceremony	Category	Result	Ref.
2019	MTV Video Music Awards	Best Power Anthem	Won	
2020	BET Awards	Viewer's Choice	Won	

== Charts ==
=== Weekly charts ===
Chart (2019)	Peak position
Australia (ARIA)	64
Canada Hot 100 (Billboard)	38
France Singles Sales Charts (SNEP)	103
Hungary (Single Top 40)	16
Ireland (IRMA)	51
Lithuania (AGATA)	41
New Zealand Hot Singles (RMNZ)	2
Scottish Singles Sales (Official Charts)	54
Slovakia Singles Digital (ČNS IFPI)	85
UK Singles (Official Charts)	40
UK Hip Hop/R&B (Official Charts)	25
US Billboard Hot 100	11
US Hot R&B/Hip-Hop Songs (Billboard)	7
US R&B/Hip-Hop Airplay (Billboard)	3
US Pop Airplay (Billboard)	36
US Rhythmic Airplay (Billboard)	1
US Rolling Stone Top 100	1

=== Year-end charts ===
Chart (2019)	Position
US Billboard Hot 100	93
US Hot R&B/Hip-Hop Songs (Billboard)	42
US Rhythmic (Billboard)	34

== Certifications ==
Region	Certification	Certified units/sales
Canada (Music Canada)	2× Platinum	160,000^{‡}
New Zealand (RMNZ)	Platinum	30,000^{‡}
United Kingdom (BPI)	Silver	200,000^{‡}
United States (RIAA)	2× Platinum	2,000,000^{‡}
^{‡} Sales+streaming figures based on certification alone.
