= 1501 Certified Entertainment =

American record label

- Founded: 2016; 10 years ago
- Founder: Carl Crawford
- Genre: Hip-hop
- Country of origin: United States
- Location: Houston, Texas, U.S.
- Official website: 1501ent.com

1501 Certified Entertainment is an American independent record label. Based in Houston, it was founded in 2016 by American former baseball player Carl Crawford. It is best known as the former record label of rapper Megan Thee Stallion, who filed multiple lawsuits against the company starting in 2020 that were collectively settled in 2023, and the label of rapper Erica Banks.

== History ==
1501 Certified Entertainment was founded in 2016 in Houston by former American baseball player Carl Crawford. T. Farris, who had formerly worked with the Swishahouse record label and its artists Paul Wall and Mike Jones, worked as its operations manager until 2020. Crawford also worked closely with record executive and Rap-A-Lot Records founder J. Prince as his consultant. Rapper HardyBoy Pigg has stated that he was the first artist signed to 1501. Many of the label's artists until 2020, including rapper Haroldlujah and singer Railey Rose, were recruited by Farris.

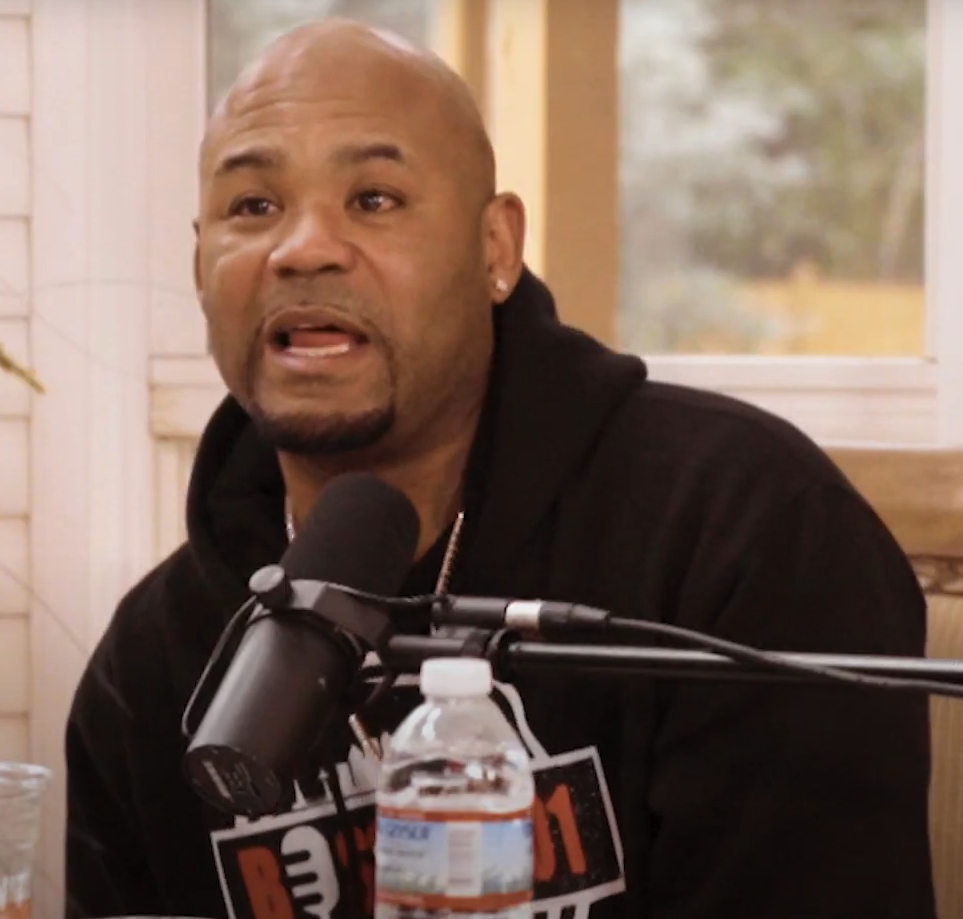
Carl Crawford in 2022

After a video of rapper Megan Thee Stallion freestyling in a 2016 Houston cypher went viral, Crawford found her through Instagram and she signed a 360 deal with 1501 in 2018. Megan Thee Stallion later signed a distribution deal with 300 Entertainment in November 2018. By 2019, 1501's roster also included rappers D-Raww and K'ona Lisa. Megan Thee Stallion's 2020 single "Savage", which topped the Billboard Hot 100, and her studio albums Good News (2020) and Traumazine (2022) were released through 1501. Rapper Erica Banks signed to 1501 in April 2020. She later signed a joint deal with 1501 and Warner Records in 2021, following the viral success of her 2020 single "Buss It" on TikTok. In May 2020, during a music video shooting for one of Crawford's then–recent signees to 1501 at his home, Bethany Lartigue, a 25-year-old football player and the signee's girlfriend, and a young boy named Kasen Hersi both drowned and died in Crawford's swimming pool. Banks soon posted in Lartigue's memory on social media.

In 2022, the label began focusing on scouting influencers to become rappers. In February 2023, amidst the label's legal battle with Megan Thee Stallion that began in 2020, Crawford stepped down as its president and announced that Kai "Verse" Tyler would be taking his place. Banks stated that she had parted ways with the label by June 2023 and accused them of owing her money in the lyrics of her song "Real Rap Bitch", a snippet of which was posted that month. The following month, Crawford claimed on Instagram Live that Banks's departure from 1501 left the label in $500 thousand of debt to Warner Records.

=== Megan Thee Stallion lawsuits ===
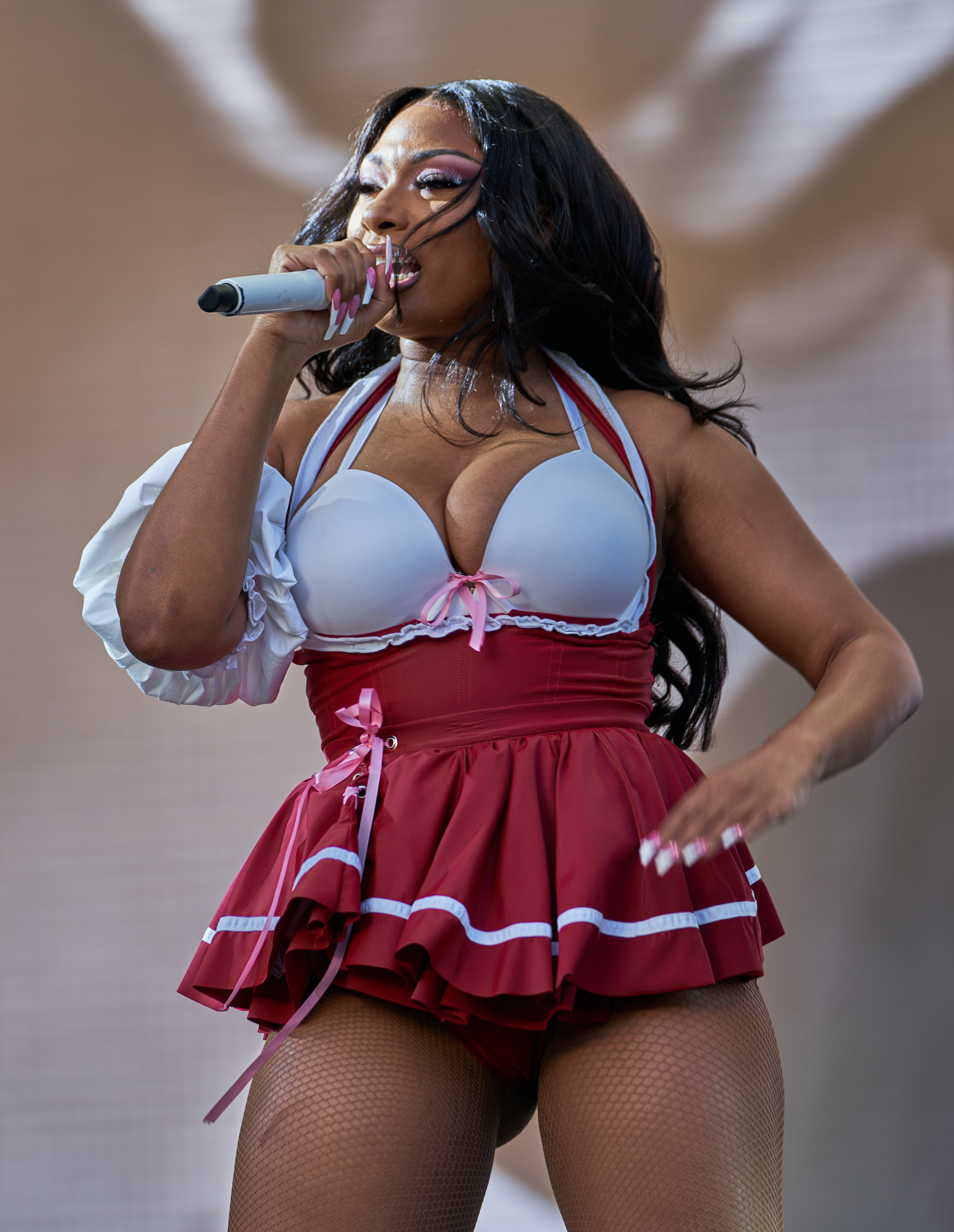
Megan Thee Stallion in 2022

Unbeknownst to Crawford, Megan Thee Stallion signed a management deal with Roc Nation in September 2019, which she announced in January 2020, with Farris leaving 1501 to work with her at Roc Nation. She stated that Roc Nation made her aware of her deal with 1501 being "unconscionable". According to her, after attempts to renegotiate her contract went awry, 1501 barred her from releasing any new music, which she shared publicly on Instagram Live in March 2020.

The following day, she filed a lawsuit against 1501, asking to have her recording contract with the company thrown out and alleging that they had misled her about the services they offered to provide her and had only paid her $15 thousand. The lawsuit also alleged that Prince had made threats related to Megan Thee Stallion's Roc Nation deal and toward her collaborator LilJuMadeDaBeat and that someone from the company had leaked photos of her 2015 mugshot. A judge soon granted her a temporary restraining order against 1501, which allowed her to release music until mid-March. She released her project Suga on March 6, 2020. In interviews with Billboard and Variety shortly thereafter, Crawford denied all of the lawsuit's allegations and blamed the dispute with Megan Thee Stallion on Farris. Complex also interviewed several of 1501's former and active artists at the time, most of whom shared that they had experienced similarly contract-related issues involving the label. A settlement was reached in March 2021, causing parts of her contract to be amended.

In August 2021, Megan Thee Stallion filed a petition against 1501 Entertainment and Crawford, alleging that they were blocking the release of her remix of the BTS song "Butter". The remix was released later that month after a judge ruled that she was cleared to release it. She sued the label again in February 2022 over their refusal to classify her compilation album Something for Thee Hotties (2021), which consisted of archival material and previously released freestyles, as an album, which she alleged was a tactic to keep her stuck in her three-album recording contract. 1501 countersued the following month, with Crawford calling the project a "bullshit ass mixtape". She added to the lawsuit in August of that year, asking for $1 million in damages due to allegedly not receiving royalties owed to her and alleging that 1501 were involved in leaking her second studio album, Traumazine. Prince soon made an Instagram post defending Crawford and 1501 and accusing Megan Thee Stallion of "consistently and intentionally breach[ing] her 1501 contract with impunity for years in ways that are too numerous to list". 1501 filed a motion in September 2022 asking the court to bypass the trial and rule that Something for Thee Hotties was not an album, which was denied in December of that year.

In November 2022, Megan Thee Stallion was granted a restraining order against 1501 Certified and 300 Entertainment, following her accusations that the label was trying to prevent the usage of her music during the 2022 American Music Awards. Also that month, Desiree Perez, Megan Thee Stallion's manager and Roc Nation's CEO, was subpoenaed to testify at a deposition by 1501. Megan Thee Stallion's lawyers criticized it as a way of "harassing Perez and disrupting her responsibilities" and attempted to prevent the deposition by filing a protective order, which was denied by a judge in January 2023. Crawford said in an interview with TMZ in February 2023 that he would stop mentioning Megan Thee Stallion's name on social media or in interviews and that the two had "never had any problems" outside of social media. Megan Thee Stallion filed another motion in April 2023 to appoint a third party to manage 1501 and Crawford's funds, with her lawyers accusing the label of siphoning money out of its primary bank account in order to become judgment proof. Weeks after Megan Thee Stallion stated on Instagram Live that she had become an independent artist, it was announced that she and 1501 had reached a settlement over their legal battle and would "amicably part ways" in October 2023. She released "Cobra", her first single released without 1501, in November 2023.

== Artists ==
=== Current ===
- Ayana Hassan
- Diamond the Body
- Erica Banks
- FNF Chxpo
- Luh CEO
- Skeatur Jones
- ThirtyBall

=== Former ===
- OG Ron C (General Manager)
- DJ Hollygrove (DJ)
- 1amBabyJoker
- D-Raww
- HardyBoy Pigg
- Haroldlujah
- K'ona Lisa
- Megan Thee Stallion
- Railey Rose
- Yung Ruler
