= Hot Girl Summer Tour =

2024 concert tour by Megan Thee Stallion

- Tour by Megan Thee Stallion
- Location: Europe; North America
- Associated album: Megan
- Start date: May 14, 2024
- End date: September 26, 2024
- Legs: 3
- No. of shows: 36
- Supporting acts: GloRilla; Ms Banks
- Box office: $40.2 million
- Website: store.megantheestallion.com/pages/tour

Megan Thee Stallion concert chronology
- Hot Girl Summer Tour (2024); ...

The Hot Girl Summer Tour was the first headlining concert tour by American rapper-songwriter Megan Thee Stallion in support of her third studio album, Megan, and her entire discography. The tour began on May 14, 2024, in Minneapolis, United States and concluded in New York City on September 26, 2024, at the Athlos Track Meet. It took place across cities in North America and Europe, comprising 36 shows. GloRilla served as the opening act for the North American leg. Ms Banks served as the opening act for the European leg.

== Background ==
On March 20, 2024, Megan formally announced the tour, with 31 shows across North America and Europe spanning from May through July 2024 which extended to 35 shows due to new dates being added. Tickets went on sale on March 22, 2024, with the artist presale on March 21.

== Commercial performance ==
On March 22, 2024, Megan announced extra dates for Chicago, Atlanta and Houston due to overwhelming demand. On April 24, 2024, Megan announced a new date for San Francisco would be added to the tour. On June 26, 2024, Megan announced a new date for Atlanta and Charlotte would be added to the tour. With the addition of the third show in Atlanta, Megan made history as the first rapper to headline three shows in the arena during one tour.

== Accolades ==
Awards and nominations for the Hot Girl Summer Tour
Year	Ceremony	Category	Result	Ref.
2024	BET Hip Hop Awards	Best Live Performer	Nominated	
2025	Pollstar Awards	Hip-Hop Tour of the Year	Nominated	
2025	iHeartRadio Music Awards	Favorite Tour Style	Nominated	
2025	iHeartRadio Music Awards	Favorite Surprise Guest (with Cardi B)	Nominated	

== Set list ==
This set list is representative of the show in Minneapolis, on May 14, 2024. It is not representative of all concerts for the duration of the North American leg.

1. "Hiss"
2. "Ungrateful"
3. "Thot Shit"
4. "Freak Nasty"
5. "Megan's Piano"
6. "Gift & a Curse"
7. "Hot Girl"
8. "Kitty Kat"
9. "Cobra"
10. "Plan B"
11. "Cognac Queen"
12. "Big Ole Freak"
13. "Girls in the Hood"
14. "Boa"
15. "Sex Talk"
16. "Eat It"
17. "What's New"
18. "Captain Hook"
19. "Southside Forever Freestyle"
20. "Ride or Die" (Interlude)
21. "Pop It"
22. "Wanna Be" (with GloRilla)
23. "WAP"
24. "NDA"
25. "Don't Stop"
26. "Stalli Freestyle"
27. "Cash Shit"
  Encore
28. "Body"
29. "Savage"

=== Notes ===
- During the show in New York City, Cardi B joined Megan on stage to perform "WAP" and "Bongos". Additionally, GloRilla performed "Tomorrow 2" with Cardi.
- During the show in London, Yuki Chiba joined Megan on stage to perform "Mamushi".

== Tour dates ==
List of concerts, showing date, city, country, venue, opening acts, attendance and gross revenue
Date (2024)	City	Country	Venue	Opening act(s)
May 14	Minneapolis	United States	Target Center	GloRilla
May 17	Chicago	United States	United Center	GloRilla
May 18	Detroit	United States	Little Caesars Arena	GloRilla
May 19	Chicago	United States	United Center	GloRilla
May 21	New York City	United States	Madison Square Garden	GloRilla
May 22	Philadelphia	United States	Wells Fargo Center	GloRilla
May 24 (Note: This concert is part of BottleRock Napa Valley.)	Napa	United States	Napa Valley Expo	—N/a
May 26 (Note: This concert is part of Boston Calling Music Festival.)	Boston	United States	Harvard Stadium	—N/a
May 28	Baltimore	United States	CFG Bank Arena	GloRilla
May 30	Memphis	United States	FedExForum	GloRilla
June 2 (Note: Originally scheduled to take place on May 31, 2024, it was rescheduled for water issues at the venue.)	Atlanta	United States	State Farm Arena	GloRilla
June 3 (Note: Originally scheduled to take place on June 1, 2024, it was rescheduled for water issues at the venue.)	Atlanta	United States	State Farm Arena	GloRilla
June 4	Raleigh	United States	PNC Arena	GloRilla
June 6	Hollywood	United States	Hard Rock Live	GloRilla
June 8	Tampa	United States	Amalie Arena	GloRilla
June 10	New Orleans	United States	Smoothie King Center	GloRilla
June 13	Austin	United States	Moody Center	GloRilla
June 14	Houston	United States	Toyota Center	GloRilla
June 15	Houston	United States	Toyota Center	GloRilla
June 16 (Note: This concert is part of Bonnaroo Music and Arts Festival.)	Manchester	United States	Great Stage Park	—N/a
June 17	Denver	United States	Ball Arena	GloRilla
June 19	Phoenix	United States	Footprint Center	GloRilla
June 21	Los Angeles	United States	Crypto.com Arena	GloRilla
June 22	Paradise (Note: Labeled as Las Vegas in promotional material.)	United States	MGM Grand Garden Arena	GloRilla
June 23	San Francisco	United States	Chase Center	GloRilla
June 26 (Note: Originally scheduled for June 11, but was rescheduled to avoid conflicting with the NBA finals.)	Dallas	United States	American Airlines Center	GloRilla
July 2	Atlanta	United States	State Farm Arena	GloRilla
July 3	Charlotte	United States	PNC Music Pavilion	GloRilla
July 7	Paris	France	Zénith Paris	Ms Banks
July 10	Amsterdam	Netherlands	Ziggo Dome	Ms Banks
July 14 (Note: Originally scheduled for July 5.)	Manchester	England	Co-op Live	Ms Banks
July 16	Birmingham	England	Utilita Arena	Ms Banks
July 17	London	England	The O_{2} Arena	Ms Banks
July 27 (Note: This concert is part of Broccoli City Festival.)	Washington, D.C.	United States	Audi Field	—N/a
August 1 (Note: This concert is part of Lollapalooza.)	Chicago	United States	Grant Park	—N/a
September 26 (Note: This concert is part of Athlos NYC.)	New York City	United States	Icahn Stadium	—N/a

=== Cancelled concerts ===
List of cancelled concerts showing date, city, country, venue and reason
Date	City	Country	Venue	Reason
July 4, 2024	Glasgow	Scotland	OVO Hydro	Scheduling changes and "venue construction"
July 11, 2024	Cologne	Germany	Lanxess Arena	Production issues
July 14, 2024	Dublin	Ireland	3Arena	Production issues
