= Boa (song) =

Single by Megan Thee Stallion

from the album Megan
- Released: May 10, 2024
- Genre: Hip hop
- Length: 2:34
- Label: Hot Girl; Warner
- Songwriters: Megan Pete; Derrick Gray; Gwen Stefani; Julian Mason; Linda Perry
- Producer: LilJuMadeDaBeat

Megan Thee Stallion singles chronology
"Wanna Be" (2024)	"Boa" (2024)	"Mamushi" (2024)

Music video
- "Boa" on YouTube

"Boa" is a song by American rapper-songwriter Megan Thee Stallion from her third studio album, Megan (2024). It was released through Hot Girl Productions and Warner Music Group on May 10, 2024, as the third single from the album. The song samples "What You Waiting For?" by Gwen Stefani, written by Stefani and songwriter Linda Perry.

== Background and composition ==
On October 19, 2023, 1501 Certified Entertainment announced that they had reached a settlement with Megan Thee Stallion in her favor, ending a three-plus-year legal battle between the two. After her departure from the label, she founded her own independent label Hot Girl Productions and announced her upcoming third studio album. Megan Thee Stallion released the singles "Cobra" and "Hiss" from the album, the latter of which debuted atop the US Billboard Hot 100. On May 7, 2024, she announced the album's third single, titled "Boa", would be released three days later and shared its cover art.

== Awards and nominations ==
Year	Ceremony	Category	Result	Ref.
2024	BET Hip Hop Awards	Best Hip Hop Video	Nominated	
2024	MTV Video Music Awards	Best Art Direction	Won	
2024	MTV Video Music Awards	Best Hip Hop	Nominated	
2024	MTV Video Music Awards	Best Direction	Nominated	
2024	MTV Video Music Awards	Best Visual Effects	Nominated	

== Track listing ==
- CD/streaming/digital download
1. "Boa" – 2:34
- Streaming/digital download – acapella
1. "Boa" (acapella) – 2:13
- Streaming/digital download – chopped & screwed
1. "Boa" (chopped & screwed) – 3:47
- Streaming/digital download – instrumental
1. "Boa" (instrumental) – 2:34
- Streaming/digital download – sped up
1. "Boa" (sped up) – 2:16

== Charts ==
Chart performance for "Boa"
Chart (2024)	Peak position
Global 200 (Billboard)	172
New Zealand Hot Singles (RMNZ)	14
UK Singles Downloads (Official Charts)	93
UK Singles Sales (OCC)	97
US Billboard Hot 100	39
US Hot R&B/Hip-Hop Songs (Billboard)	13
US Rhythmic Airplay (Billboard)	31

== Certifications ==
Certifications for "Boa"
Region	Certification	Certified units/sales
United States (RIAA)	Gold	500,000^{‡}
^{‡} Sales+streaming figures based on certification alone.

== Release history ==
Release dates and formats for "Boa"
Region	Date	Format	Version	Label	Ref.
Various	May 10, 2024	CD; digital download; streaming	Original	Hot Girl Productions	
Various	May 10, 2024	Digital download; streaming	Acapella	Hot Girl Productions	
Various	May 10, 2024	Digital download; streaming	Chopped & screwed	Hot Girl Productions	
Various	May 10, 2024	Digital download; streaming	Instrumental	Hot Girl Productions	
Various	May 10, 2024	Digital download; streaming	Sped up	Hot Girl Productions	
