= 2024 MTV Video Music Awards =

41st edition of the MTV Video Music Awards held in 2024

- Date: Wednesday, September 11, 2024; 8:00—11:18 p.m. EDT
- Venue: UBS Arena, Elmont, New York
- Country: United States
- Hosted by: Megan Thee Stallion

Highlights
- Most awards: Taylor Swift (7)
- Most nominations: Taylor Swift (12)
- Website: mtv.com/vma

Television/radio coverage
- Network: MTV; MTV2; VH1; BET; BET Her; Nick at Nite; CMT; Comedy Central; Paramount Network; Pop; TV Land; Logo TV; Univision; Vix; Channel 5 (UK); 10 Peach (AU)
- Viewership: 2.1 million
- Produced by: Bruce Gillmer; Jesse Ignjatovic
- Directed by: Joe DeMaio

The 2024 MTV Video Music Awards were held at the UBS Arena in Elmont, New York, on September 11, 2024. The ceremony was originally scheduled to take place on September 10, 2024, but was rescheduled to a day later to avoid conflicts with the presidential debate between Donald Trump and Kamala Harris. The show was hosted by rapper Megan Thee Stallion, marking her hosting debut.

It honored the best music videos and songs released between June 22, 2023, and June 20, 2024. Two new award categories, VMAs Most Iconic Performance and Best Trending Video, were awarded through the fan votes. Taylor Swift was the most nominated and awarded artist, winning seven trophies out of twelve nominations, including five wins out of nine nominations for her collaboration with Post Malone on the single "Fortnight". Katy Perry was honored with the Michael Jackson Video Vanguard Award presented by her then fiancé Orlando Bloom. This was the first VMA ceremony to be available on subscription streaming, through Vix.

== Performances ==
=== Pre-show ===
Le Sserafim was announced as a performer for the pre-show on September 6, 2024.

Artist(s)	Song(s)
Le Sserafim	"1-800-Hot-N-Fun" "Crazy"

=== Main show ===
Artist(s)	Song(s)
Eminem	"Houdini" "Somebody Save Me" (with Jelly Roll)
Karol G	"Si Antes Te Hubiera Conocido"
Lisa	"New Woman" "Rockstar"
Shawn Mendes	"Nobody Knows"
Sabrina Carpenter	"Please Please Please" "Taste" "Espresso"
Anitta	"Paradise" (with Fat Joe and DJ Khaled) "Alegría" (with Tiago PZK) "Savage Funk"
Katy Perry	Michael Jackson Video Vanguard Medley "Dark Horse" "E.T." "I'm His, He's Mine" (with Doechii) "California Gurls" "Teenage Dream" "I Kissed a Girl" "Firework" "Lifetimes"
Chappell Roan	"Good Luck, Babe!"
Megan Thee Stallion	"Boa" "Miami Blue" "B.A.S." "Rattle" "Hiss" "Mamushi" (with Yuki Chiba)
Benson Boone	"Beautiful Things"
Rauw Alejandro	"Touching The Sky" "Diluvio" "Déjame Entrar"
Halsey	"Ego" (with Victoria De Angelis)
Lenny Kravitz	"Are You Gonna Go My Way" "Human" "Fly" (with Quavo)
Camila Cabello	"June Gloom" "Godspeed"
GloRilla	"Yeah Glo!" "TGIF"
LL Cool J	Def Jam 40th Anniversary Medley "Headsprung" "Bring the Noise" (with Chuck D and Flavor Flav) "Mama Said Knock You Out" "Rock the Bells" "Around the Way Girl" "Goin’ Back to Cali" "Passion" "Proclivities" "Doin’ It"

==== Extended Play stage ====
Extended Play stage performers were announced on September 6, 2024.

Artist(s)	Song(s)
Teddy Swims	"Lose Control" "The Door" "Stay"
Jessie Murph	"Wild Ones" "I Hope It Hurts" "Killing Me Softly with His Song"

== Presenters ==
The first round of presenters were announced on September 6, 2024. Kevan Kenney, Nessa, and Dometi Pongo hosted the 90-minute pre-show event. Megan Thee Stallion was announced as the main show host on August 22, 2024.

=== Pre-show ===
- Kevan Kenney – presented Best Alternative, Best Trending Video and Best Rock
- Nessa – presented VMAs Most Iconic Performance

=== Main show ===
- Jordan Chiles and Flavor Flav – presented Best Collaboration
- Addison Rae – introduced Karol G
- Tinashe – announced the finalists for Best New Artist and presented the award later in the night
- Paris Hilton - introduced Lisa
- Danna and Big Sean - introduced Teddy Swims and the Extended Play Stage
- Cyndi Lauper - introduced Sabrina Carpenter
- French Montana and Amelia Dimoldenberg - introduced Anitta, Fat Joe and DJ Khaled
- Orlando Bloom - introduced Katy Perry and presented the Michael Jackson Video Vanguard Award
- Sasha Colby – introduced Chappell Roan
- Halle Bailey and Lil Nas X – presented Best Afrobeats
- Fat Joe and DJ Khaled - introduced Megan Thee Stallion
- Damiano David – introduced Benson Boone
- Miranda Lambert - presented Song of the Year
- Alessandra Ambrosio - introduced Rauw Alejandro
- Naomi Scott - introduced Jessie Murph at the Extended Play Stage
- Carson Daly - presented Best K-Pop
- Suki Waterhouse - introduced Lenny Kravitz
- Megan Thee Stallion - introduced GloRilla
- Thalía - presented Best Latin
- Busta Rhymes - introduced LL Cool J and the Def Jam 40th Anniversary performance
- Megan Thee Stallion - presented Video of the Year

== Winners and nominees ==
The first round of nominees were announced on August 6, 2024. The second round of nominees were announced on August 30, which included two new award categories–VMAs Most Iconic Performance and Best Trending Video. Taylor Swift led with twelve, followed by Post Malone with eleven, Eminem with eight, Ariana Grande, Megan Thee Stallion and Sabrina Carpenter who had seven nominations each, and SZA, with six. Swift was the most awarded nominee with seven wins, followed by Malone with five, and Eminem and Megan Thee Stallion with two each.

=== Voted categories ===
The winners of the following categories were chosen by fan votes. The first round of voting known as the "General Voting Period" began on August 6 at 11:45pm ET, for the categories which nominees were announced on the same day and concluded on August 30 at 6pm ET, except for Best New Artist, which concluded on September 10 at 10pm ET. The second round of voting known as the "Instagram Story Voting" began on September 2 at 11am ET and concluded on September 11 at 11am ET.

Winners are listed first and highlighted in bold.

Video of the Year (Presented by Burger King)	Song of the Year
**Taylor Swift featuring Post Malone – "Fortnight"**; Ariana Grande – "We Can't Be Friends (Wait for Your Love)"; Billie Eilish – "Lunch"; Doja Cat – "Paint the Town Red"; Eminem – "Houdini"; SZA – "Snooze"	**Sabrina Carpenter – "Espresso"**; Beyoncé – "Texas Hold 'Em"; Jack Harlow – "Lovin on Me"; Kendrick Lamar – "Not Like Us"; Taylor Swift featuring Post Malone – "Fortnight"; Teddy Swims – "Lose Control"
Artist of the Year	Best New Artist
**Taylor Swift**; Ariana Grande; Bad Bunny; Eminem; Sabrina Carpenter; SZA	**Chappell Roan**; Benson Boone; Gracie Abrams; Shaboozey; Teddy Swims; Tyla
Push Performance of the Year	Best Collaboration
**June 2024: Le Sserafim – "Easy"**; August 2023: Kaliii – "Area Codes"; September 2023: GloRilla – "Lick or Sum"; October 2023: Benson Boone – "In the Stars"; November 2023: Coco Jones – "ICU"; December 2023: Victoria Monét – "On My Mama"; January 2024: Jessie Murph – "Wild Ones"; February 2024: Teddy Swims – "Lose Control"; March 2024: Chappell Roan – "Red Wine Supernova"; April 2024: Flyana Boss – "Yeaaa"; May 2024: Laufey – "Goddess"; July 2024: The Warning – "Automatic Sun"	**Taylor Swift featuring Post Malone – "Fortnight"**; Drake featuring Sexyy Red and SZA – "Rich Baby Daddy"; GloRilla and Megan Thee Stallion – "Wanna Be"; Jessie Murph featuring Jelly Roll – "Wild Ones"; Jungkook featuring Latto – "Seven"; Post Malone featuring Morgan Wallen – "I Had Some Help"
Best Pop	Best Hip Hop
**Taylor Swift**; Camila Cabello; Dua Lipa; Olivia Rodrigo; Sabrina Carpenter; Tate McRae	**Eminem – "Houdini"**; Drake featuring Sexyy Red and SZA – "Rich Baby Daddy"; GloRilla – "Yeah Glo!"; Gunna – "FukUMean"; Megan Thee Stallion – "Boa"; Travis Scott featuring Playboi Carti – "Fe!n"
Best R&B	Best K-Pop
**SZA – "Snooze"**; Alicia Keys – "Lifeline"; Muni Long – "Made for Me"; Tyla – "Water"; Usher, Summer Walker and 21 Savage – "Good Good"; Victoria Monét – "On My Mama"	**Lisa – "Rockstar"**; Jungkook featuring Latto – "Seven"; NCT Dream – "Smoothie"; NewJeans – "Super Shy"; Stray Kids – "Lalalala"; Tomorrow X Together – "Deja Vu"
Best Latin	Best Rock
**Anitta – "Mil Veces"**; Bad Bunny – "Monaco"; Karol G – "Mi Ex Tenía Razón"; Myke Towers – "Lala"; Peso Pluma and Anitta – "Bellakeo"; Rauw Alejandro – "Touching the Sky"; Shakira and Cardi B – "Puntería"	**Lenny Kravitz – "Human"**; Bon Jovi – "Legendary"; Coldplay – "Feelslikeimfallinginlove"; Green Day – "Dilemma"; Kings of Leon – "Mustang"; U2 – "Atomic City"
Best Alternative	Best Afrobeats
**Benson Boone – "Beautiful Things"**; Bleachers – "Tiny Moves"; Hozier – "Too Sweet"; Imagine Dragons – "Eyes Closed"; Linkin Park – "Friendly Fire"; Teddy Swims – "Lose Control (Live)"	**Tyla – "Water"**; Ayra Starr featuring Giveon – "Last Heartbreak Song"; Burna Boy – "City Boys"; Chris Brown featuring Davido and Lojay – "Sensational"; Tems – "Love Me JeJe"; Usher and Pheelz – "Ruin”
Video for Good	Song of Summer (Presented by Hilton)
**Billie Eilish – "What Was I Made For?"**; Alexander Stewart – "If You Only Knew"; Coldplay – "Feelslikeimfallinginlove"; Joyner Lucas and Jelly Roll – "Best for Me"; RAYE – "Genesis"; Tyler Childers – "In Your Love"	**Taylor Swift featuring Post Malone – "Fortnight"**; Ariana Grande – "We Can't Be Friends (Wait for Your Love)"; Benson Boone – "Beautiful Things"; Billie Eilish – "Birds of a Feather"; Chappell Roan – "Good Luck, Babe!"; Charli XCX and Billie Eilish – "Guess"; Eminem – "Houdini"; Future, Metro Boomin and Kendrick Lamar – "Like That"; GloRilla and Megan Thee Stallion – "Wanna Be"; Hozier – "Too Sweet"; Kendrick Lamar – "Not Like Us"; Post Malone featuring Morgan Wallen – "I Had Some Help"; Sabrina Carpenter – "Please Please Please"; Shaboozey – "A Bar Song (Tipsy)"; SZA – "Saturn"; Tommy Richman – "Million Dollar Baby"
Best Group
**Seventeen**; Coldplay; Imagine Dragons; NCT Dream; NewJeans; NSYNC; Tomorrow X Together; Twenty One Pilots
VMAs Most Iconic Performance	Best Trending Video
**Katy Perry – "Roar" (2013, live from Empire-Fulton Ferry Park)**; Beyoncé – "Love on Top" (2011); Britney Spears, Christina Aguilera, Madonna and Missy Elliott – "Like a Virgin" and "Hollywood" (2003); Eminem – "The Real Slim Shady" and "The Way I Am" (2000); Lady Gaga – "Paparazzi" (2009); Madonna – "Like a Virgin" (1984); Taylor Swift – "You Belong with Me" (2009)	**Megan Thee Stallion featuring Yuki Chiba – "Mamushi"**; Beyoncé – "Texas Hold 'Em"; Camila Cabello featuring Playboi Carti – "I Luv It"; Chappell Roan – "Hot to Go!"; Charli XCX – "Apple"; Tinashe – "Nasty"

=== Professional categories ===
The winners of the following categories were chosen by industry professionals.

Winners are listed first and highlighted in bold.

Best Visual Effects	Best Editing
**Eminem – "Houdini" (Visual Effects: Synapse Virtual Production, Louise Lee, Rich Lee, Metaphysic and Flawless Post)**; Ariana Grande – "The Boy Is Mine" (Visual Effects: Digital Axis); Justin Timberlake – "Selfish" (Visual Effects: Max Colt and FRENDER); Megan Thee Stallion – "Boa" (Visual Effects: Mathematic); Olivia Rodrigo – "Get Him Back!" (Visual Effects: Uppercut, John Geehreng, Steve Cokonis, Mitch Gardiner, Chelsea Pistono, John Ashby, Alice Cen, Ernie Armitage, Georgina Poushkine, Cooper Vacheron, Preston Mohr, Karen Arakelian and Justin Johnson); Taylor Swift featuring Post Malone – "Fortnight" (Visual Effects: Parliament)	**Taylor Swift featuring Post Malone – "Fortnight" (Editor: Chancler Haynes)**; Anitta – "Mil Veces" (Editor: Nick Yumul); Ariana Grande – "We Can't Be Friends (Wait for Your Love)" – (Editor: Luis Caraza Peimbert); Eminem – "Houdini" (Editor: David Checel); Lisa – "Rockstar" (Editor: Nik Kohler); Sabrina Carpenter – "Espresso" (Editor: Jai Shukla)
Best Direction	Best Art Direction
**Taylor Swift featuring Post Malone – "Fortnight" (Director: Taylor Swift)**; Ariana Grande – "We Can't Be Friends (Wait for Your Love)" (Director: Christian Breslauer); Bleachers – "Tiny Moves" (Directors: Alex Lockett and Margaret Qualley); Eminem – "Houdini" (Director: Rich Lee); Megan Thee Stallion – "Boa" (Director: Daniel Iglesias Jr.); Sabrina Carpenter – "Please Please Please" (Director: Bardia Zeinali)	**Megan Thee Stallion – "Boa" (Art Director: Brittany Porter)**; Charli XCX – "360" (Art Director: Grace Surnow); Lisa – "Rockstar" (Art Director: Pongsan Thawatwichian); Olivia Rodrigo – "Bad Idea Right?" (Art Director: Nicholas des Jardins); Sabrina Carpenter – "Please Please Please" (Art Director: Nicholas des Jardins); Taylor Swift featuring Post Malone – "Fortnight" (Art Director: Ethan Tobman)
Best Choreography	Best Cinematography
**Dua Lipa – "Houdini" (Choreographer: Charm La'Donna)**; Bleachers – "Tiny Moves" (Choreographer: Margaret Qualley); Lisa – "Rockstar" (Choreographer: Sean Bankhead); Rauw Alejandro – "Touching the Sky" (Choreographer: Felix 'Fefe' Burgos); Tate McRae – "Greedy" (Choreographer: Sean Bankhead); Troye Sivan – "Rush" (Choreographer: Sérgio Reis)	**Ariana Grande – "We Can't Be Friends (Wait for Your Love)" – (Director of Photography: Anatol Trofimov)**; Charli XCX – "Von Dutch" (Director of Photography: Jeff Bierman); Dua Lipa – "Illusion" (Director of Photography: Nikita Kuzmenko); Olivia Rodrigo – "Obsessed" (Director of Photography: Marz Miller); Rauw Alejandro – "Touching the Sky" (Director of Photography: Camilo Monsalve); Taylor Swift featuring Post Malone – "Fortnight" (Director of Photography: Rodrigo Prieto)

== Special awards ==
The following awards have special significance and are not necessarily awarded annually. Katy Perry was announced as the recipient of the Michael Jackson Video Vanguard Award on August 15.

Michael Jackson Video Vanguard Award
Katy Perry

== Artists with multiple wins and nominations ==
Artists who received multiple awards
Wins	Artist
7	Taylor Swift
5	Post Malone
2	Eminem
2	Katy Perry
2	Megan Thee Stallion

Artists who received multiple nominations
Nominations	Artist
12	Taylor Swift
11	Post Malone
8	Eminem
7	Ariana Grande
7	Megan Thee Stallion
7	Sabrina Carpenter
6	SZA
4	Benson Boone
4	Billie Eilish
4	Chappell Roan
4	Charli XCX
4	GloRilla
4	Lisa
4	Olivia Rodrigo
4	Teddy Swims
3	Anitta
3	Beyoncé
3	Bleachers
3	Coldplay
3	Dua Lipa
3	Kendrick Lamar
3	Rauw Alejandro
3	Tyla
2	Bad Bunny
2	Camila Cabello
2	Drake
2	Hozier
2	Imagine Dragons
2	Jelly Roll
2	Jessie Murph
2	Jungkook
2	Latto
2	Madonna
2	Morgan Wallen
2	NCT Dream
2	NewJeans
2	Playboi Carti
2	Sexyy Red
2	Shaboozey
2	Tate McRae
2	Tomorrow X Together
2	Usher
2	Victoria Monét

== Music Videos with multiple wins and nominations ==
Music Videos that received multiple awards
Wins	Artist(s)	Music Video
5	Taylor Swift (featuring Post Malone)	"Fortnight"
2	Eminem	"Houdini"

Music Videos that received multiple nominations
Nominations	Artist(s)	Music Video
9	Taylor Swift (featuring Post Malone)	"Fortnight"
6	Eminem	"Houdini"
5	Ariana Grande	"We Can't Be Friends (Wait for Your Love)"
4	Lisa	"Rockstar"
4	Megan Thee Stallion	"Boa"
3	Bleachers	"Tiny Moves"
3	Rauw Alejandro	"Touching the Sky"
3	Sabrina Carpenter	"Please Please Please"
2	Sabrina Carpenter	"Espresso"
2	Anitta	"Mil Veces"
2	Benson Boone	"Beautiful Things"
2	Beyoncé	"Texas Hold 'Em"
2	Coldplay	"Feelslikeimfallinginlove"
2	Drake (featuring Sexyy Red and SZA)	"Rich Baby Daddy"
2	GloRilla & Megan Thee Stallion	"Wanna Be"
2	Hozier	"Too Sweet"
2	Jessie Murph	"Wild Ones"
2	Jungkook (featuring Latto)	"Seven"
2	Kendrick Lamar	"Not Like Us"
2	Post Malone (featuring Morgan Wallen)	"I Had Some Help"
2	SZA	"Snooze"
2	Teddy Swims	"Lose Control"
2	Tyla	"Water"
2	Victoria Monét	"On My Mama"

== Voting system ==
The official voting system for the 2024 MTV Video Music Awards, according to MTV, was as follows:

- Each voter must be at least 13 years or older and should not be affiliated with Viacom International Inc. to participate in the voting.

=== General voting period ===
- The first round of voting was known as the "General Voting Period" and included most of the voted categories (15 out of 19 categories).
- It began on August 6 at 11:45 am. ET, and concluded on August 30 at 6 pm. ET, except for Best New Artist, which concluded on September 10 at 10 pm. ET.
- Each voter could vote up to 10 times per category per day through Vote.MTV.com.
- Voters should have signed in to their MTV.com Account, as it's necessary to limit their votes across devices.

==== Double Days and Power Hours ====
- There were three "Double Days" with "Power Hours".
  - August 6 from 11:45 am. to 11:59 pm. ET
  - August 7 from 12 am. to 11:59 am. ET
  - August 30 from 12 am. to 6 pm. ET
- During these periods, voting limits were doubled; each voter could vote up to 20 times per category per day.

=== Instagram Story voting ===
- The second round of voting was known as the "Instagram Story Voting" and included Best Trending Video, Group of the Year, Song of the Summer and VMAs Most Iconic Performance.
- It was held through MTV's Instagram stories.
- Voters could vote by clicking on their favorite nominees on Instagram polling stickers.

==== Single-round voting ====
- Best Trending Video was held as "single-round voting" from September 2 at 11am ET to September 3 at 11am ET.
- VMAs Most Iconic Performance was held as "single-round voting" from September 10 at 11am ET until September 11 at 11am ET.

==== Triple-round voting ====
- Group of the Year was held as "triple-round voting" from September 3 at 11am ET to September 6 at 11am ET.
- In each round, nominees proceeded to the next round by bracket standings.

==== Four-round voting ====
- Song of Summer was held as "four-round voting" from September 6 at 11am ET to September 10 at 11am ET.
- In each round, nominees proceeded to the next round by bracket standings.

== Ratings ==
The 2024 MTV Video Music Awards received 2.1 million viewers across all networks, including 728,000 viewers on MTV. It is unclear if this includes viewership from Univision.

The ceremony score their biggest audience in four years with 4.08 million, up 8% compared to the previous year. It was offered on streaming through Vix and had an additional linear encore airing on UniMás.

== Reaction ==
After receiving the award for Best Afrobeats Video, in her acceptance speech, South African singer Tyla described the victory as "special but also bittersweet," as she went on to express her thoughts about categorizing every African genre as Afrobeats.

In her acceptance speech for Video of the Year for "Fortnight (feat. Post Malone)" Taylor Swift gave a shoutout to her boyfriend, Travis Kelce. Swift described "Fortnight" as "the most fun video to make," and urged fans to vote in the upcoming 2024 presidential election.
