= 2024 BET Hip Hop Awards =

Annual edition of the awards show

- Date: October 15, 2024
- Location: Las Vegas, Nevada
- Hosted by: Fat Joe
- Most awards: Kendrick Lamar (8)
- Most nominations: Megan Thee Stallion (12)

Television/radio coverage
- Network: BET

The 2024 BET Hip Hop Awards was held on October 15, 2024, as the 18th installment of the BET Hip Hop Awards, to recognize the best in hip hop music of 2024. The ceremony was taped in Las Vegas, Nevada on October 8, and broadcast on BET the following week on October 15. The awards was hosted by Fat Joe.

The nominations were announced on September 18, 2024; Megan Thee Stallion led the nominations with twelve, followed by Kendrick Lamar with eleven.

== Nominees & Winners ==
=== Hip Hop Artist of the Year ===
* Kendrick Lamar

- 21 Savage
- Cardi B
- Drake
- Future
- GloRilla
- Megan Thee Stallion
- Nicki Minaj

=== Album of the Year ===
* Pink Friday 2 – Nicki Minaj

- American Dream – 21 Savage
- Ehhthang Ehhthang – GloRilla
- For All the Dogs Scary Hours Edition – Drake
- In Sexyy We Trust – Sexyy Red
- Megan – Megan Thee Stallion
- One of Wun – Gunna
- Utopia – Travis Scott

=== Best Hip Hop Video ===
* "Not Like Us" – Kendrick Lamar

- "8AM in Charlotte" – Drake
- "Band4Band" – Central Cee featuring Lil Baby
- "Bent" – 41
- "Big Mama" – Latto
- "Boa" – Megan Thee Stallion
- "Enough (Miami)" – Cardi B
- "Type Shit" – Future, Metro Boomin, Travis Scott & Playboi Carti

=== Best Collaboration ===
* "Like That" – Future, Metro Boomin & Kendrick Lamar

- "At the Party" – Kid Cudi featuring Pharrell Williams & Travis Scott
- "Band4Band" – Central Cee featuring Lil Baby
- "Bongos" – Cardi B featuring Megan Thee Stallion
- "Everybody" – Nicki Minaj featuring Lil Uzi Vert
- "First Person Shooter" – Drake featuring J. Cole
- "Mamushi" – Megan Thee Stallion featuring Yuki Chiba
- "Wanna Be" – GloRilla featuring Megan Thee Stallion

=== Best Duo/Group ===
* Future & Metro Boomin

- ¥$, Kanye West & Ty Dolla $ign
- 2 Chainz & Lil Wayne
- 41
- Common & Pete Rock
- EarthGang
- Flyana Boss
- Rick Ross & Meek Mill

=== Best Live Performer ===
* Missy Elliott

- Burna Boy
- Busta Rhymes
- Cardi B
- Drake
- GloRilla
- Kendrick Lamar
- Megan Thee Stallion
- Nicki Minaj
- Travis Scott

=== Lyricist of the Year ===
* Kendrick Lamar

- 21 Savage
- Cardi B
- Common
- Drake
- Lil Wayne
- Megan Thee Stallion
- Nicki Minaj

=== Video Director of the Year ===
* Dave Free & Kendrick Lamar

- 20k Visuals
- A$AP Rocky
- Cactus Jack
- Cole Bennett
- Dave Meyers & Travis Scott
- Doja Cat & Nina McNeely
- Offset

=== DJ of the Year ===
* The Alchemist

- Big Von
- D-Nice
- DJ Drama
- DJ Khaled
- Kaytranada
- Metro Boomin
- Mustard

=== Producer of the Year ===
* The Alchemist

- ATL Jacob
- Cash Cobain
- Hit-Boy
- Hitmaka
- Metro Boomin
- Pete Rock
- Q-Tip

=== Song of the Year ===
* "Not Like Us" – Kendrick Lamar

- "Agora Hills" – Doja Cat
- "Bent" – 41
- "Fe!n" – Travis Scott featuring Playboi Carti
- "FTCU" – Nicki Minaj
- "Get It Sexyy" – Sexyy Red
- "Like That" – Future, Metro Boomin & Kendrick Lamar
- "Mamushi" – Megan Thee Stallion featuring Yuki Chiba
- "Yeah Glo!" – GloRilla

=== Best Breakthrough Hip Hop Artist ===
* Sexyy Red

- 41
- 310babii
- BossMan Dlow
- Cash Cobain
- Lady London
- Skilla Baby
- Tommy Richman

=== Hustler of the Year ===
* 50 Cent

- A$AP Rocky
- Cam'ron & Ma$e
- Cardi B
- Drake
- Fat Joe
- GloRilla
- Kendrick Lamar
- Megan Thee Stallion

=== Sweet 16: Best Featured Verse ===
* Kendrick Lamar – "Like That" (Future, Metro Boomin & Kendrick Lamar)

- 21 Savage – "Good Good'" (Usher, Summer Walker & 21 Savage)
- A$AP Rocky – "Gangsta" (Free Nationals, A$AP Rocky & Anderson .Paak)
- Cardi B – "Wanna Be (Remix)" (GloRilla, Megan Thee Stallion & Cardi B)
- Drake – "Meltdown" (Travis Scott featuring Drake)
- J. Cole – "First Person Shooter" (Drake featuring J. Cole)
- Lil Wayne – "Brand New" (Tyga, YG & Lil Wayne)
- Megan Thee Stallion – "Wanna Be" (GloRilla featuring Megan Thee Stallion)

=== Impact Track ===
* "Not Like Us" – Kendrick Lamar

- "Blessings" – Nicki Minaj featuring Tasha Cobbs Leonard
- "Fortunate" – Common & Pete Rock
- "Get in with Me" – BossMan Dlow
- "Hiss" – Megan Thee Stallion
- "Humble Me" – Killer Mike
- "Precision" – Big Sean
- "Yeah Glo!" – GloRilla

=== Best Hip-Hop Platform ===
* Club Shay Shay

- Bootleg Kev
- Complex
- Drink Champs
- Million Dollaz Worth of Game
- On the Radar
- The Breakfast Club
- The Joe Budden Podcast
- The Shade Room
- XXL

=== Best International Flow ===
* Ghetts (UK)

- Bashy (UK)
- Blxckie (South Africa)
- Budah (Brazil)
- Leys Mc (France)
- Maglera Doe Boy (South Africa)
- Odumodublvck (Nigeria)
- Racionais MC's, (Brazil)
- SDM (France)
- Stefflon Don (UK)
