= Mamushi (song) =

2024 single by Megan Thee Stallion featuring Yuki Chiba

- Promotional picture

Single by Megan Thee Stallion featuring Yuki Chiba

from the album Megan
- Language: English; Japanese
- Released: July 30, 2024
- Genre: Hip hop
- Length: 2:36
- Label: Hot Girl; Warner
- Songwriters: Megan Pete; Yuki Chiba; Koshiro Ota
- Producer: Koshy

Megan Thee Stallion singles chronology
"Boa" (2024)	"Mamushi" (2024)	"Neva Play" (2024)

Yuki Chiba singles chronology
"Team Tomodachi" (2024)	"Mamushi" (2024)

Music video
- "Mamushi" on YouTube

"Mamushi" is a song by American rapper and songwriter Megan Thee Stallion featuring Japanese rapper Yuki Chiba from the former's third studio album, Megan (2024). After going viral on the video-sharing platform TikTok, the song was released to urban radio by Hot Girl Productions and Warner Music Group as the album's fourth single on July 30, 2024. Produced by Koshy, the bilingual track sees Megan and Chiba rapping in English and Japanese. A remix featuring South Korean girl group Twice was released as a part of Megan: Act II (2024), the reissue of Megan.

== Background and release ==
"Mamushi" was initially released as an album track on Megan Thee Stallion's third studio album, Megan, which was released on June 28, 2024. The song gained fame due to a viral TikTok dance trend created by user @mona712_official, with 157,000 videos made with the song by July 9, 2024. In response, Megan posted several TikToks of herself following the dance trend, including one of her cosplaying as the anime series Sailor Moon's lead character Usagi Tsukino. On July 30, the song was released as a single to urban radio, becoming the number-one most added song on the format. On October 25, a remix of "Mamushi" featuring South Korean girl group Twice instead of Chiba was released on Megan: Act II, the reissue of Megan.

== Composition ==
Produced by Koshy and written by Megan, Chiba, and Koshiro Ota, "Mamushi" sees both Megan and Chiba rapping in English and Japanese. Its title refers to a mamushi, a type of snake mainly found in Japan, which continues the snake-related imagery and metaphors in Megan's previous singles "Cobra", "Hiss", and "Boa". Lyrically, "Mamushi" has been interpreted as depicting Megan "regaining her past and letting go of it in order to represent the fame and prosperity she’s now achieving." The first half of the chorus is spoken by Chiba in Japanese, who raps "Okane kasegu, orera wa sutā" (お金稼ぐ 俺らはスター), which is translated as "We make money, we are stars." Chiba uses the word "ore", an informal way of referring to oneself in Japanese used by younger males. Megan then raps the phrase "Watashi wa sutā" (私はスター) in the second half of the chorus, which translates to "I'm a star." She uses the word "watashi", the slightly formal, or a feminine way to refer to oneself in Japanese.

== Music video ==
The scene shown here, with the gangsters now revived as a blue-faced group of men standing around Megan is a nod to the 1990 film, Dreams by Japanese filmmaker Akira Kurosawa.

The music video for "Mamushi", directed by Kevin "Onda" Leyva premiered on August 9, 2024, and was filmed in part at both Tsurumaki Onsen Jinya and Engaku-ji Temple. The video takes place at a bathhouse where Megan lures male gangsters into her den before transforming into a gigantic mamushi snake and killing them. Yuki Chiba who is seen working at the bathhouse then cleans up and paints her victims blue, before they are then revived into an army of the dead that follow Megan's every word. The scene with the blue-faced group of men standing around Megan is a nod to the 1990 film, Dreams by Japanese filmmaker Akira Kurosawa. Multiple scenes from the music video also take inspiration from other films such as the 2001 film Rush Hour 2, as well as feature multiple Japanese actors, most notably Show Kasamatsu who is the first of the men to be killed by Megan.

== Critical reception ==
The song received generally positive reviews. Music critics have compared the song to "Otaku Hot Girl", another track from Megan. Karen Gwee of NME wrote "Though not as effortless, 'Mamushi' is a change of pace for Megan, who over an icy, skeletal beat follows the swaggering lead of Yuki Chiba". Mankaprr Conteh of Rolling Stone commented "Though 'Mamushi,' with its simple beat, repetitive hook, and choppy cadence, isn't as exciting as its counterpart, it may be an important signal to her international fans and sign of her passions (plus, it has a pretty cute TikTok dance routine taking off)." She additionally stated "it's easy to imagine the album as stronger" without the "elementary palate of 'Mamushi.'" Aron A. of HotNewHipHop commented the artists "share fantastic chemistry" on the song. Some critics had a more favorable view of "Mamushi" than "Otaku Hot Girl"; Alphonse Pierre of Pitchfork wrote "The better song that leans into her fondness for Japanese culture is the multilingual 'Mamushi,' which pulls off the theme without flattening her personality." Lucas Martins of BPM stated "The mid-tempo 'Mamushi' executes the idea much better, as the off-kilter approach to the hook and her interplay with guest rapper Yuki Chiba allow her to make what would otherwise be a rather stiff song really come alive."

== Commercial performance ==
"Mamushi" debuted at number 68 on the US Billboard Hot 100 with 7.3 million streams and 1,000 downloads sold in its opening week, later peaking at number 36. It also debuted at number 18 on Hot Rap Songs and number 21 on Hot R&B/Hip-Hop Songs. The song marked Chiba's first-ever entry on the Billboard Hot 100. The following week, it also became both Megan and Chiba's first-ever number 1 on the Billboard World Digital Song Sales chart.

== Awards and nominations ==
Year	Ceremony	Category	Version	Result	Ref.
2024	BET Hip Hop Awards	Song of the Year	Original featuring Yuki Chiba	Nominated	
2024	BET Hip Hop Awards	Best Collaboration	Original featuring Yuki Chiba	Nominated	
2024	MTV Video Music Awards	Best Trending Video	Original featuring Yuki Chiba	Won	
2025	Music Awards Japan	Best Cross-Border Collaboration Song	Original featuring Yuki Chiba	Nominated	
2025	Music Awards Japan	Best International Hip Hop/Rap Song in Japan	Original featuring Yuki Chiba	Nominated	
2025	Music Awards Japan	Best of Listeners' Choice: International Song	Original featuring Yuki Chiba	Nominated	
2025	Music Awards Japan	Best of Listeners' Choice: International Song	Remix featuring Twice	Nominated	

== Track listing ==
- Streaming/digital download
1. "Mamushi" (sped up) – 2:09
2. "Mamushi" (chopped & screwed) – 3:15
3. "Mamushi" (instrumental) – 2:36

== Charts ==
=== Weekly charts ===
Weekly chart performance
Chart (2024)	Peak position
Australia (ARIA)	87
Australia Hip Hop/R&B (ARIA)	14
Canada Hot 100 (Billboard)	56
Global 200 (Billboard)	29
Greece International (IFPI)	23
Honduras Anglo Airplay (Monitor Latino)	4
India International (IMI)	14
Japan Hot Overseas (Billboard Japan)	4
Malaysia (Billboard)	10
Malaysia International (RIM)	9
New Zealand Hot Singles (RMNZ)	6
Nigeria (TurnTable Top 100)	80
Philippines (Philippines Hot 100)	43
Singapore (RIAS)	11
Suriname (Nationale Top 40)	2
Turkey International Airplay (Radiomonitor Türkiye)	10
UK Singles (Official Charts)	89
US Billboard Hot 100	36
US Hot R&B/Hip-Hop Songs (Billboard)	7
US Pop Airplay (Billboard)	37
US Rhythmic Airplay (Billboard)	1
US World Digital Song Sales (Billboard)	1

=== Year-end charts ===
Year-end chart performance
Chart (2024)	Position
US Hot R&B/Hip-Hop Songs (Billboard)	44
US Rhythmic (Billboard)	48

== Certifications ==
Certifications
Region	Certification	Certified units/sales
Australia (ARIA)	Gold	35,000^{‡}
Canada (Music Canada)	Gold	40,000^{‡}
New Zealand (RMNZ)	Gold	15,000^{‡}
Poland (ZPAV)	Gold	25,000^{‡}
United States (RIAA)	Platinum	1,000,000^{‡}
^{‡} Sales+streaming figures based on certification alone.

== Release history ==
Release dates and formats
Region	Date	Format	Version	Label	Ref.
United States	July 30, 2024	Urban radio	Original	Hot Girl Productions	
Various	August 2, 2024	Digital download; streaming	Sped up; chopped & screwed; instrumental	Hot Girl Productions	
