= Otaku Hot Girl =

2024 song by Megan Thee Stallion

Song by Megan Thee Stallion

from the album Megan
- Released: June 28, 2024
- Genre: Hip hop
- Length: 2:38
- Label: Hot Girl; Warner
- Songwriters: Megan Pete; Joel Banks; Taylor Banks
- Producer: Bankroll Got It

Music video
- "Otaku Hot Girl" on YouTube

"Otaku Hot Girl" is a song by American rapper-songwriter Megan Thee Stallion, released on June 28, 2024, from her third studio album, Megan (2024). Produced by Bankroll Got It, it samples the bumper music (or eyecatch) to the anime series Jujutsu Kaisen.

== Background ==
Megan Thee Stallion explained in an Instagram Live session on June 26, 2024, that she had recorded the song before securing clearance for a sample from an anime production. On June 25, 2024, she received an email from the sample owners demanding that she either remove use of names of the show's characters in the lyrics, or the entire sample, and restricted her from cosplaying any of their characters in a music video for the song. Megan re-recorded the song without using names of the characters in a makeshift studio, hours before performing in Dallas as part of her Hot Girl Summer Tour.

== Composition ==
The song contains trap production alongside a sample of the Jujutsu Kaisen theme music, and features an intro from Adam McArthur, the voice actor of series protagonist Yuji Itadori in the English dub. Megan makes references to Jujutsu Kaisen characters in the lyrics, such as Satoru Gojo, as well as Naruto Uzumaki and Sasuke Uchiha from Naruto.

== Critical reception ==
The song received generally mixed reviews. Music critics have compared the song to "Mamushi", another track from Megan. Karen Gwee of NME commented the song "sounds like the shonen-spirited flex she was destined to write." Mankaprr Conteh of Rolling Stone praised the line "Bitch they not pro-you, they anti-me", which she cited as an example of when Megan Thee Stallion "lets her jokes and entendres simmer", and regarded "Mamushi" to be not as "exciting" as "Otaku Hot Girl". Alphonse Pierre of Pitchfork had a negative reaction, writing "Bankroll Got It's drum-heavy flip of the soundtrack is uninteresting—though it's not like he's working with an anime renowned for its music—and the character references are earnest but unbearably corny." Lucas Martins of BPM stated the song "attempts to bring Megan's love for Japan into the mix, but the overbearing trap production muddles its uniqueness."

== Music video ==
The music video premiered on July 3, 2024. It shows various clips of Megan Thee Stallion's trip to Japan earlier in the year, including those of her presenting at the 8th Crunchyroll Anime Awards, meeting fans, shopping, eating local food, singing karaoke, cosplaying and going to Universal Studios.

== Charts ==
Chart performance for "Otaku Hot Girl"
Chart (2024)	Peak position
New Zealand Hot Singles (RMNZ)	19
US Billboard Hot 100	67
US Hot R&B/Hip-Hop Songs (Billboard)	20

== See also ==
- Anime and hip-hop
