= Morgan Bullock =

American Irish dancer

Morgan Bullock is an American Irish dancer, known for her Irish dance remix of rapper Megan Thee Stallion's song "Savage", which went viral on TikTok and Instagram in May 2020.

== Biography ==
Bullock started dancing when she was 3 and discovered Irish dance at the age of 10. She has been dancing at the Baffa Academy of Irish Dance in Richmond, Virginia ever since. In 2019, she placed 43rd at the Irish dance world championships.

In May 2020, she posted a video to TikTok of her Irish dancing to the popular song "Savage" by Megan Thee Stallion. The video was reposted by large accounts on several social media platforms, including Taoiseach (Irish prime minister) Leo Varadkar – who invited her to Ireland to dance in the 2021 Saint Patrick's Day parade – Beyoncé's mother Tina Knowles, Irish-Nigerian author Emma Dabiri, and the large Instagram account The Shade Room. Padraic Moyles, the lead dancer of Irish folk music show Riverdance, invited her to join the show's US tour when it comes to Virginia and offered her free admission to their summer school, Riverdance Academy. Bullock stated she faced backlash from users on social media who saw her untraditional dancing as appropriating Irish culture, but she explained it, "represented a very small minority of the feedback that [she] got".

In November 2020, she joined Irish Minister of State Colm Brophy and Ambassador of Ireland to the United States Daniel Mulhall in Ireland's new diaspora strategy, which according to Taoiseach Micheál Martin: "seeks to give [Ireland's] diaspora a strengthened voice within Irish life, while also setting out the many ways this Government will work to support the Irish abroad." Due to the COVID-19 pandemic, Bullock was unable to attend the St. Patrick's Day parade in Ireland, but in March 2021, she performed virtually for the US' Embassy of Ireland.

In October 2022, Bullock was announced as one of the recipients of the Presidential Distinguished Service Award for the Irish Abroad for 2022 in the category of Arts, Culture and Sport.

=== Personal life ===
As of June 2020, Bullock is pursuing a master of education degree at Virginia Commonwealth University to become an elementary school teacher.
