= Megan (album) =

2024 studio album by Megan Thee Stallion

- Standard cover

Studio album by Megan Thee Stallion
- Released: June 28, 2024
- Genre: Hip-hop
- Length: 51:55
- Languages: English, Japanese
- Labels: Hot Girl; Warner Music
- Producers: 8 Major; 30 Roc; Akeel Henry; Bankroll Got It; Ben10k; Buddah Bless; Da Honorable C.N.O.T.E.; Derrick Milano; FranchiseDidIt; Freaky Rob; Go Grizzly; Hitkidd; Jacob Waddy; Juicy J; Koshy; the Legendary Traxster; LilJuMadeDaBeat; Megan Thee Stallion; Shawn "Source" Jarrett; Sloan; Tay Keith; xSDTRK

Megan Thee Stallion chronology
Traumazine (2022)	Megan (2024)	Megan: Act II (2024)

Singles from Megan
- 1. "Cobra" Released: November 3, 2023; 2. "Hiss" Released: January 26, 2024; 3. "Boa" Released: May 10, 2024; 4. "Mamushi" Released: July 30, 2024

Megan is the third studio album by American rapper Megan Thee Stallion. It was released through Hot Girl Productions and Warner Music Group on June 28, 2024. It is Megan's first album to be released under her independent label Hot Girl Productions after her departure from former labels 300 Entertainment and 1501 Certified Entertainment.

Conceptually, Megan follows a snake-based theme and motif through the titles of the singles and the promotional material. The album received generally favorable reviews from music critics, with praise towards the newfound creative freedom on display, although some found it to be uneven. The album was supported by four singles: "Cobra", "Hiss", "Boa", and "Mamushi". "Hiss" became Megan's first solo number-one on the US Billboard Hot 100 and the Billboard Global 200, while all singles peaked within the top 40 in the United States.

Commercially, Megan debuted at number three on the US Billboard 200 with 64,000 album-equivalent units earned, and became the rapper's fifth top-ten project on the chart. To promote the album, Megan embarked on the Hot Girl Summer Tour, her first headlining concert tour. The album's deluxe edition, titled Megan: Act II, was released on October 25, 2024.

== Background and content ==
On October 19, 2023, 1501 Certified Entertainment revealed that Megan Thee Stallion had settled the lawsuit with the company, and that they "amicably decided to part ways". Shortly after, Megan clarified on an Instagram livestream, stating that her album would be self-funded and "the budget is coming from me".

She teased the first post-departure project via three Instagram posts on October 12, which were collectively captioned "Let's begin". Each post featured one image that, when combined, read "Act One". On October 23, Megan posted on her social media a teaser of her upcoming album stating "Just as a snake sheds it skin, we must shed our past, over and over again" under her independent music and entertainment company Hot Girl Productions. On February 2, 2024, Megan signed a distribution deal with Warner Music Group which would allow her the creative control of an independent artist, but with access to the company's resources.

The track "Paper Together" features Houston rap duo UGK, including a previously unreleased posthumous verse from Pimp C. Megan, a longtime fan of Pimp C, described the opportunity for the collaboration as "iconic" and "legendary". For the song "Otaku Hot Girl", which pays homage to several anime series she enjoys, she managed to clear some legal paperwork with MAPPA regarding permission pertaining to the use of Jujutsu Kaisen characters among those referenced days before the album release.

== Release and promotion ==
On January 30, 2024, Megan Thee Stallion did an interview with Good Morning America, revealing that she planned to tour for that upcoming summer season. On March 20, Megan formally announced the Hot Girl Summer Tour, which began May 14 in Minneapolis and is set to conclude August 1 in Chicago. Megan announced the album and its release at the first of two shows at the State Farm Arena in Atlanta, Georgia.

=== Singles ===
The album's lead single, "Cobra", was released on November 3, 2023, alongside a music video directed by Douglas Bernardt. Just five days later, Megan released a rock remix of "Cobra", with the Canadian-American alternative metal band Spiritbox. The single debuted at number 32 on the US Billboard Hot 100.

The album's second single, "Hiss", was released on January 26, 2024, alongside a music video, also directed by Douglas Bernardt. "Hiss" debuted atop the Billboard Hot 100, becoming Megan's first solo chart-topping single and third overall. It also debuted at number one on the Billboard Global 200, making Megan the first female rapper in a lead role to debut atop the chart in history.

The album's third single, "Boa", was released on May 10, 2024. The track debuted at number 39 on the Billboard Hot 100, becoming the third top-40 single from the album.

The album's fourth single, "Mamushi", featuring Japanese rapper Yuki Chiba, was released to urban radio on July 30, 2024. The track peaked at number 36 on the Billboard Hot 100, becoming the fourth top-40 single from the album.

== Critical reception ==
Professional ratings
Aggregate scores
Source	Rating
AnyDecentMusic?	6.4/10
Metacritic	67/100
Review scores
Source	Rating
AllMusic	3.5/5 stars
Beats Per Minute	72%
The Guardian	2/5 stars
NME	4/5 stars
Northern Transmissions	7.3/10
Pitchfork	6.6/10
Rolling Stone	3.5/5 stars

According to the review aggregator Metacritic, Megan received "generally favorable reviews" based on a weighted average score of 67 out of 100 from 6 critic scores. Karen Gwee of NME wrote that the project "flows with a palpably higher level of creative boldness", finding it more cohesive than previous albums. Gwee wrote that "Megan was often lashing out; here, she stings with venomous precision" and she "sprawls out, mining different aspects of her identity and personality at her leisure". Maria Sherman of the Associated Press also found that the rapper "sounds as strong as ever, atop chugging riffs and fluttering synths", because "on this album, Megan is most interested in exorcising the demons given to her by haters".

Rachel Aroesti of The Guardian praised the rapper's "satisfyingly brisk and crisp" flow, in which she explained that "Megan's world is one of false friends, mutually adulterous relationships and incessant betrayal, spurred by jealousy", which however "feels merely like the depressing apex of this oppressively navel-gazing rap phenomenon's isolation". Alphonse Pierre of Pitchfork defined Megan as "an uneven album so preoccupied with giving every single type of fan exactly what they want", even though he understood the "pressures, especially in rap, where hit-making women have historically been discarded quickly".

== Commercial performance ==
Megan debuted at number three on the US Billboard 200 chart, (earning 64,000 album-equivalent units including 16,000 pure sales). The album also accumulated a total of 62.67 million on-demand streams of the album's songs. It was the first top 10-charting album by a female rapper in 2024.

== Track listing ==
Standard track listing
No.	Title	Writer(s)	Producer(s)	Length
1.	"Hiss"	Megan Pete; Julian Mason; Joel Banks; Taylor Banks; Shawn "Source" Jarrett	LilJuMadeDaBeat; Bankroll Got It; Jarrett	3:12
2.	"Rattle"	Pete; Mason; Bobby Sessions	LilJuMadeDaBeat	3:25
3.	"Figueroa"	Pete; Mason; Kelton Scott II	LilJuMadeDaBeat; FranchiseDidIt	2:23
4.	"Where Them Girls At"	Pete; Mason; Joe Fountain; Kordero Williams (Note: "Where Them Girls At" contains a sample of "Booty Hopscotch", written and performed by Kstylis.)	LilJuMadeDaBeat	3:11
5.	"Broke His Heart"	Pete; Brytavious Chambers; Aldrin Davis; Derrick Gray; Jordan Houston III; Jay Jenkins (Note: "Broke His Heart" contains a sample of "I Luv It", written and performed by Jeezy.); Jerome Temple	Tay Keith	2:39
6.	"B.A.S." (featuring Kyle Richh)	Pete; Henry Fasheun; Mason; Mary Brockert (Note: "B.A.S." contains a sample of "Out on a Limb", written and performed by Teena Marie.)	LilJuMadeDaBeat; Megan Thee Stallion	3:26
7.	"Otaku Hot Girl (Note: "Otaku Hot Girl" samples the bumper music from its second season of Jujutsu Kaisen, and it features an uncredited spoken intro from American voice actor Adam McArthur, who dubs the anime's protagonist Yuji Itadori.)"	Pete; J. Banks; T. Banks	Bankroll Got It	2:38
8.	"Find Out"	Pete; Samuel Gloade; 8 Major; Sloan; Samuel Lindley (Note: "Find Out" contains a sample from "Do U?", written and performed by Do or Die, Twista, and Johnny P.); Carl Mitchell; Dennis Round; Darnell Smith	30 Roc; 8 Major; Sloan; the Legendary Traxster	2:35
9.	"Boa"	Pete; Mason; Gray; Gwen Stefani (Note: "Boa" contains a sample of "What You Waiting For?", written by Gwen Stefani and Linda Perry, as performed by Stefani.); Linda Perry	LilJuMadeDaBeat	2:34
10.	"Mamushi" (featuring Yuki Chiba)	Pete; Yuki Chiba; Koshiro Ota	Koshy	2:36
11.	"Accent" (featuring GloRilla)	Pete; Gloria Woods; J. Banks; T. Banks; Benjamin Wilson; Jarrett	Bankroll Got It; Ben10k; Jarrett	3:19
12.	"Paper Together" (featuring UGK)	Pete; Chad Butler; Bernard Freeman; Houston; Kevin Price	Juicy J; Go Grizzly	3:35
13.	"Spin" (featuring Victoria Monét)	Pete; Victoria McCants; Yonatan Ayal; Akeel Henry; Travis Simmons	xSDTRK; Henry	3:07
14.	"Down Stairs DJ"	Pete; Carlton Mays, Jr.	Da Honorable C.N.O.T.E.	2:44
15.	"Miami Blue" (featuring Big K.R.I.T. and Buddah Bless)	Pete; Justin Scott; Tyron Douglas; Jacob Waddy Gayton	Buddah Bless; Jacob Waddy	2:37
16.	"Worthy"	Pete; Rob Gueringer	Freaky Rob	2:19
17.	"Moody Girl"	Pete; Houston; Anthony Holmes; Marc Gay; Carl Martin	Juicy J; Hitkidd	2:47
18.	"Cobra"	Pete; J. Banks; T. Banks; Gray; Jarett; Stanley Clarke (Note: "Cobra" contains a sample of "After the Cosmic Rain (Live at Musikladen)", written and performed by Return to Forever.)	Bankroll Got It; Derrick Milano; Jarett	2:48
Total length:				51:55

Amazon Music bonus track
No.	Title	Writer(s)	Length
19.	"It's Prime Day"	Pete	2:04
Total length:			53:59

== Personnel ==
=== Musicians ===
- Megan Thee Stallion – vocals
- Kyle Richh – vocals (track 6)
- Yuki Chiba – vocals (track 10)
- GloRilla – vocals (track 11)
- UGK – vocals (track 12)
- Victoria Monét – vocals (track 13)
- Big K.R.I.T. – vocals (track 15)
- Buddah Bless – vocals (track 15)
- Diggy Lessard – guitar (track 18)

=== Technical ===
- Colin Leonard – mastering
- Leslie Brathwaite – mixing (tracks 1–12, 14–18)
- Patrizio "Teezio" Pigliapoco – mixing (track 13)
- Shawn "Source" Jarrett – engineering
- Todd Robinson – engineering (track 13)
- Dominique "Cookisdope" Cook – engineering assistance
- Maysin Sexton – engineering assistance (tracks 1, 3, 5–7, 9–14, 16–18)
- Dani Stephenson – engineering assistance (tracks 1, 18)
- Derek Spence – engineering assistance (tracks 2, 7, 15)
- Jean Paul Quintero – engineering assistance (tracks 4, 8)
- Chris Weaver – engineering assistance (tracks 6, 11, 12)
- Federico Giordano – engineering assistance (track 13)
- Ignancio Portales – engineering assistance (track 13)

== Charts ==
=== Weekly charts ===
Weekly chart performance for Megan
Chart (2024)	Peak position
Australian Albums (ARIA)	94
Australian Hip Hop/R&B Albums (ARIA)	23
Canadian Albums (Billboard)	53
New Zealand Albums (RMNZ)	33
Nigerian Albums (TurnTable)	72
Portuguese Albums (AFP)	134
UK Albums (Official Charts)	97
UK R&B Albums (Official Charts)	40
US Billboard 200	3
US Top R&B/Hip-Hop Albums (Billboard)	1

=== Year-end charts ===
2024 year-end chart performance for Megan
Chart (2024)	Position
US Billboard 200	184
US Top R&B/Hip-Hop Albums (Billboard)	52

2025 year-end chart performance for Megan
Chart (2025)	Position
US Top R&B/Hip-Hop Albums (Billboard)	72

== Release history ==
Region	Date	Formats(s)	Label	Ref.
Various	June 28, 2024	Box set; CD; digital download; streaming	Hot Girl; Warner	
Various	November 22, 2024	LP	Hot Girl; Warner	
