= Hiss (song) =

Single by Megan Thee Stallion

from the album Megan
- Released: January 26, 2024
- Genre: Hip hop
- Length: 3:12
- Label: Hot Girl
- Composers: Shawn "Source" Jarrett; Joel Banks; Taylor Banks
- Lyricist: Megan Pete
- Producers: LilJuMadeDaBeat; Bankroll Got It; Shawn "Source" Jarrett

Megan Thee Stallion singles chronology
"Not My Fault" (2023)	"Hiss" (2024)	"Wanna Be" (2024)

Music video
- "Hiss" on YouTube

"Hiss" is a song by American rapper-songwriter Megan Thee Stallion from her third studio album, Megan (2024). It was released independently through Hot Girl Productions on January 26, 2024, as the second single from the album.

"Hiss" was met with widespread critical acclaim, with praise for the lyrics and rap flow. The song also attracted media coverage regarding the multiple artists that were indirectly dissed in the lyrics, with a subsequent notable reaction and controversy regarding fellow rapper Nicki Minaj. Commercially, the song debuted at number one on the Billboard Hot 100, marking Megan Thee Stallion's third number-one single as well as her first as a solo artist. It debuted at number one on the Billboard Global 200, where it became her second number-one single, and made Megan Thee Stallion the first lead female rapper to debut atop the chart. The single additionally charted within the top 20 in Canada and Greece, while reaching the top 40 in the United Kingdom and Ireland.

== Background ==
On October 19, 2023, 1501 Certified Entertainment announced that they had reached a settlement with Megan Thee Stallion in her favor, ending a three-plus-year legal battle between the two. After her departure from the label, she founded her own independent label Hot Girl Productions and announced her upcoming third studio album. Megan Thee Stallion released the album's lead single, "Cobra", on November 3, 2023. On January 22, 2024, she announced her follow-up single "Hiss" would be released on January 26 and shared its cover art, depicting her posing with a white snake around her neck. Two days prior to the release of "Hiss", Megan Thee Stallion posted a snippet of its spoken word intro, in which she issues a warning to the song's intended subjects.

== Composition ==
"Hiss" was written by Thee Stallion with long-time co-writers Joel Banks and Shawn "Source" Jarrett, who produced the song with LilJuMadeDaBeat, Bankroll Got It, and Derrick Milano. The song is characterized by aggressive and confident delivery and features both a spoken word intro and another spoken word break between the first and second verse.

=== Lyrics ===
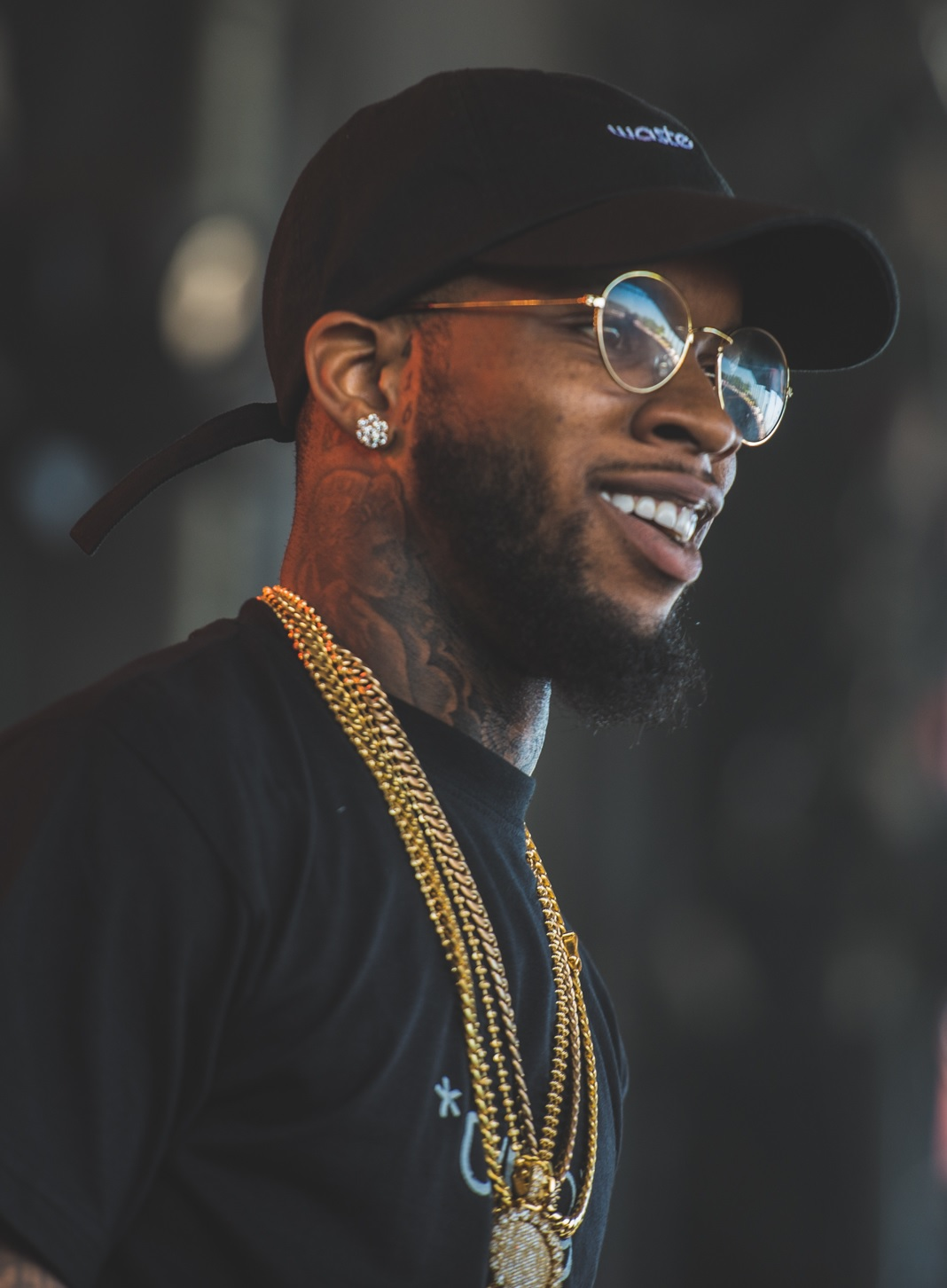
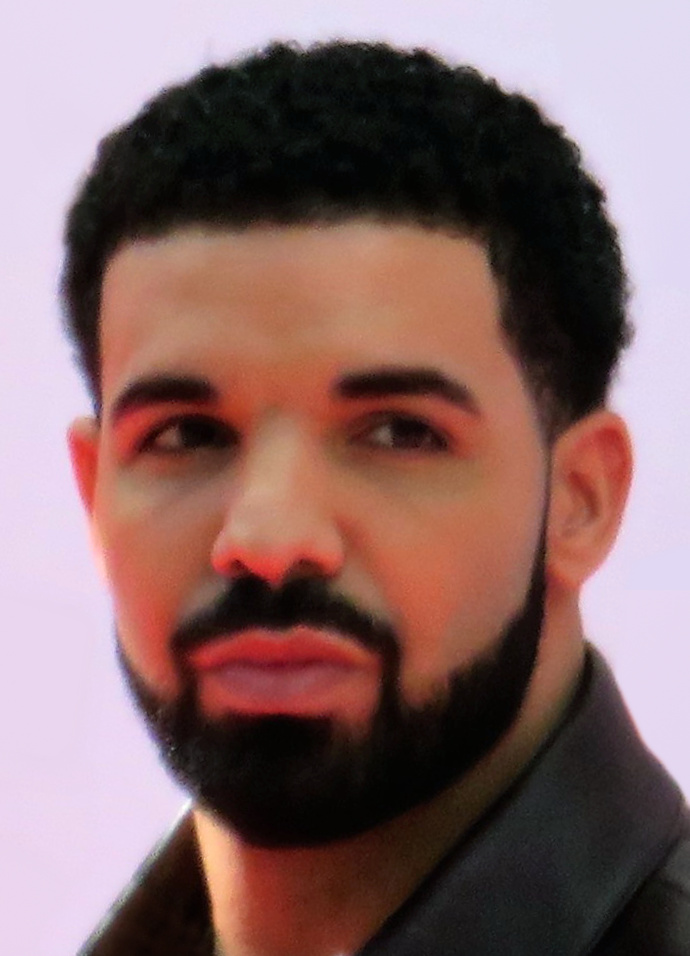
Fans and critics perceived some of the lyrics of "Hiss" as disses towards rappers Tory Lanez (left) and Drake (right).

Publications reported that the lyrics of "Hiss" address different disses towards multiple artists who previously spoke out negatively against Megan. According to Consequence, "Megan fires back with venomous lyrics going after the biggest names who called her a liar".

In the opening verse, Megan raps "I feel like Mariah Carey, got these niggas so obsessed", referencing Carey's 2009 single "Obsessed". Later, she alludes to her shooting in 2020 by Tory Lanez and the subsequent trial, which resulted in the conviction of Lanez and his sentencing to ten years in prison: "Any man go against me, I handle shit/I'm the Teflon Don in the court room/They be throwin' that dirt, don't shit stick." Towards fans defending Tory Lanez, Megan suggests that they download JPay, a money transfer service for the United States prison system, to send some money or even that they schedule a "conjugal visit", given all the "dick riding".

Megan Thee Stallion allegedly goes on to address Canadian rapper Drake, who previously dissed Megan on his song "Circo Loco" (2022). She raps, "These niggas hate on BBLs and be walkin' 'round with the same scars [...] Cosplay gangsters, fake-ass accents." These lines were taken by publications and fans to be disses towards Drake aimed at his scars being caused by an alleged ab surgery, claims previously made by Joe Budden and DJ Carnage. Megan also alleges in the song that her ex Pardison Fontaine cannot move on and has to keep speaking out about Megan to stay relevant.

Megan Thee Stallion further raps the line that "these hoes don't be mad at Megan, these hoes mad at "Megan's Law", I don't really know what the problem is, but I guarantee y'all don't want me to start, Bitch, you a pussy, never finna check me, every chance you get, bet yo weak ass won't address me". Megan's Law is the name of a federal law that requires registered sex offenders to provide their personal information to local law enforcement agencies. The bars were taken as a diss towards rapper Nicki Minaj by critics, fans, and Minaj herself, due to the fact that her brother Jelani Maraj and husband Kenneth Petty are registered sex offenders.

== Reception ==
=== Critics ===
Chris Malone Méndez of Forbes found the song "lyrically complete 180[°] from the more honest 'Cobra'" and that "a snake theme seems to have been the right choice for Megan's next chapter". Liberty Dunworth of NME stressed that the rapper "show[s] off her confidence and ability to refuse to give any attention to those trying to drag her down" with her flow, carrying forward the "theme of snakes in her music". Eddie Fu of Consequence affirmed that Megan's "pen is sharper than ever, which is good news for everyone who's been rooting for her and bad news for those foolish enough to stand in her way." Paul K. Barnes of Medium praised Megan's "aggression and confidence" in her delivery as well as the "clever punchlines" of the lyrics.

Critics' year-end rankings of "Hiss"
Publication	List	Rank	Ref.
Vulture	The Best Songs of 2024	2	
NME	The 50 Best Songs of 2024	10	
Cosmopolitan	The Best Songs of 2024	12	
Rolling Stone	The 100 Best Songs of 2024	25	

=== Nicki Minaj ===
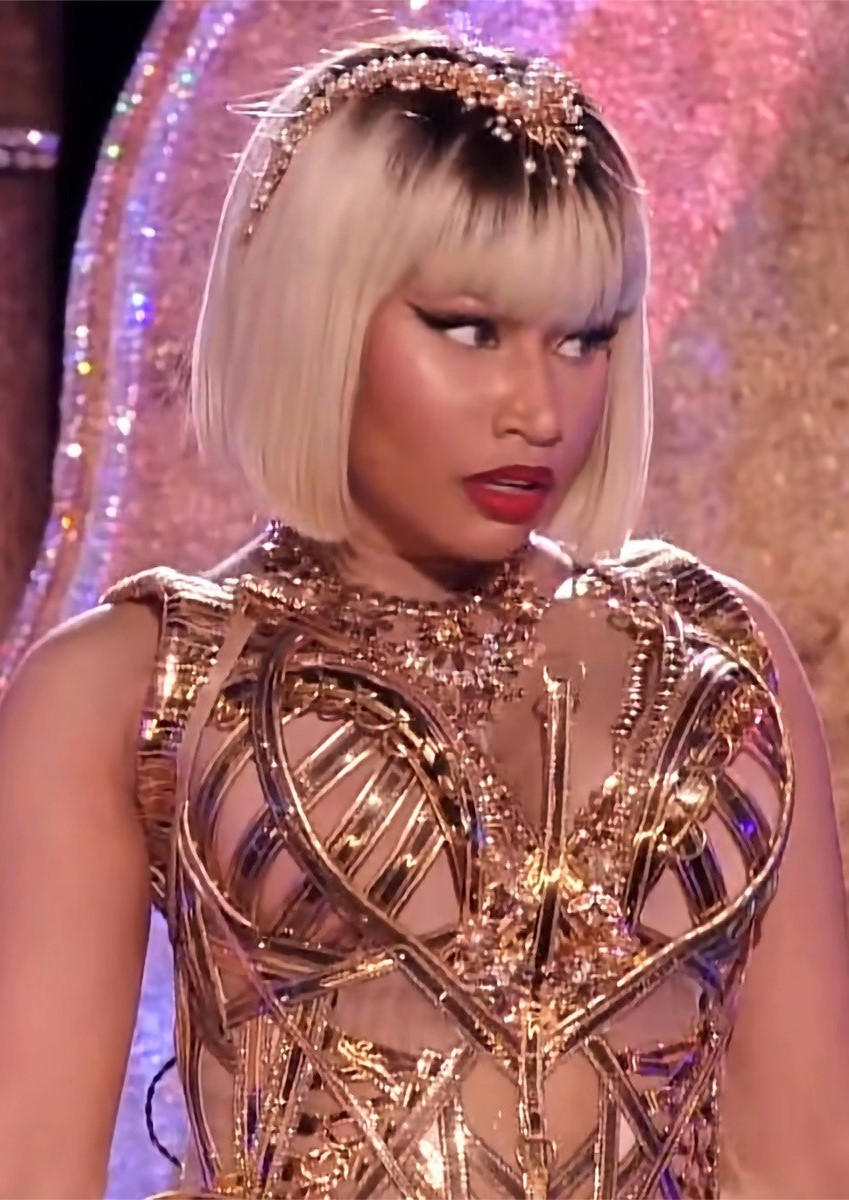
Rapper Nicki Minaj, interpreting lyrics in "Hiss" as a diss, attacked Megan on social media and released her own diss track "Big Foot" in response.

Rapper Nicki Minaj took offense to the line "These hoes don't be mad at Megan, these hoes mad at Megan's Law", interpreting it to be a diss directed at her; both her brother and her husband, Jelani Maraj and Kenneth Petty, are registered sex offenders. In 2019, Petty was sentenced to a year of house arrest along with probation and a $55,000 fine for failing to register as a sex offender in California. Following the release of "Hiss", Minaj almost immediately took to Instagram Live to preview her own song, rapping "Bad bitch, she like 6 foot, I call her Bigfoot/The bitch fell off, I said 'Get up on your good foot'", referencing the 2020 shooting of Megan by Lanez. On the live, Minaj criticized Megan, saying "You have three Grammys and you have to learn how to rap on the beat and being comfortable in the music", before mocking her rap flow. Minaj also liked hundreds of tweets from fans talking negatively about Megan, many of which mocked her for the shooting. Megan posted an Instagram story where she was doubled over with her left hand on her mouth, seemingly laughing at Minaj's response.

Rolling Stone reported that Minaj posted a 3,100-character diatribe on Twitter directed at Megan, stating she did not "condone bullying" before calling Megan a "horrible actor that can't cry on cue" and a "pathological and manipulative liar". In the same post, Minaj bragged about the performance of her fifth studio album, Pink Friday 2 (2023), and compared the success of her song "Barbie World" for Barbie (2023) to Megan's song "Hell No!" for The Color Purple (2023). She continued by accusing Megan of winning "fraudulent awards" and of using ghostwriters for her raps. Minaj defended her husband Kenneth Petty on Instagram Live and labeled his rape conviction "30-year-old tea from when this man was a 15-year-old child", adding "no man will ever fucking love you, and lying on your dead mother", a reference to Megan's mother, who died of brain cancer in March 2019. On the radio app Stationhead, Minaj continued to discuss Megan's mother, as well as Tory Lanez and Megan's former collaborator DaBaby, alleging that "You let DaBaby be thrown under the bus, Tory, your best friend, your mom. You better go conjure up your mother and apologize." On Twitter, she called Megan a "disgusting serpant [sic]" and shared the lyrics "Megan's Law. For a free beat you could hit #MeganRAW." Tabloid magazine TMZ alleged that a number of Barbz, Minaj's fandom, leaked the location of the burial site of Megan's mother on social media, and as a result the cemetery notified local authorities and increased the number of security personnel at their facility; however, Minaj refuted that she had encouraged her fans to desecrate the gravesite.

Two days after the song's release, Minaj announced the release of the track "Big Foot", posting the single cover alongside a photo of Megan Thee Stallion crying. However, Minaj claimed the song is not a diss track. A few hours prior to her release of "Big Foot", Minaj disclosed that her team was waiting for LilJuMadeDaBeat to clear the beat and suggested Megan was trying to prevent the diss track from coming out, claiming that the song had been ready for two days. The song was delayed further for another six hours before being released on January 29. In "Big Foot", Minaj taunts Megan over her deceased mother, her appearance, her ex-boyfriend Pardison Fontaine, and her 2020 shooting; publications reported that the song was poorly received by fans, who criticized the attacks against Megan as being in bad taste.

=== Kanka family ===
Tabloid magazine TMZ reported that Richard Kanka, father of the late Megan Kanka, after whom Megan's Law was named, found the use of the law's name in "Hiss" disrespectful. Kanka admitted to not hearing the track and only reading the lyrics, and reportedly did not want his daughter's name mentioned in an "expletive-riddled song" and is considering pursuing legal options.

== Music video ==
An official music video, directed by Douglas Bernardt, was released on January 26, 2024, through the rapper's YouTube channel. In the video, Megan raps alone with no background dancers or extras. She transitions between several different settings like a "capillary instillation" in front of various screens displaying her image. The music video for the snake-themed song amassed more than 2.1 million views in a day, making it the number-one trending music video on YouTube, with the lyric-only version bringing in 1.2 million views and reaching number three on the trending list.

== Commercial performance ==
"Hiss" was immediately successful in the United States, reaching number one on the US Apple Music singles chart within a day after its release. It also reached number one on the global Apple Music singles chart, her second solo song to do so after "Body" (2020). With "Hiss" and "Body", Megan Thee Stallion became the first female rapper ever to have multiple solo songs reach number one on the global chart. "Hiss" earned 3.2 million on-demand audio streams on its opening day, and fell by 27% to 2.3 million streams by Sunday. Following the release of Nicki Minaj's response diss track "Big Foot" on Sunday, streams of "Hiss" shot up by 60% to 3.8 million on Monday, while "Big Foot" began with a strong debut of 4.1 million streams. However, by Wednesday, "Hiss" was leading "Big Foot" by most real-time metrics, holding the top spot on both Spotify and Apple Music's daily US streaming charts and the number two and three spots on the iTunes chart with multiple other versions in the top 25. While streams of "Hiss" remained high through the week, those of "Big Foot" fell off quickly, with the song only achieving 1.1 million streams in the last day of the tracking week.

"Hiss" officially debuted at number one on the US Billboard Hot 100 dated February 10, 2024. It marked Megan Thee Stallion's third number-one song on the chart after "Savage" (2020) featuring Beyoncé and "WAP" (2020) with Cardi B, and her first solo number-one song. Its debut was powered by strong sales and streaming figures of 104,000 digital downloads sold and 29.2 million streams garnered within its first week of availability from January 26 to February 1, as well as 2.9 million radio airplay audience impressions. This led the song to debut atop Billboard's Streaming Songs and Digital Song Sales charts, becoming her fourth number-one single on either chart, after "Savage" and "WAP" on both as well as "Body" on the former and "Bongos" (2023) with Cardi B on the latter. "Hiss" concurrently debuted atop the Hot R&B/Hip-Hop Songs and Hot Rap Songs charts, earning Megan Thee Stallion her third number-one song after "Savage" and "WAP". Forbes noted that the song's performance was boosted by the feud with Nicki Minaj and the release of multiple versions, although it placed above Minaj's "Big Foot" on Spotify and Apple Music charts. On their 2024 mid-year report, Luminate reported that "Hiss" was the sixth best-selling digital song of the year in the U.S., selling 107,000 units through June 27, 2024.

"Hiss" also debuted at number one on the Billboard Global 200 dated February 10, 2024. The song achieved 39.6 million streams and 99,000 sold worldwide within its first week of availability from January 26 to February 1. With "Hiss", Megan Thee Stallion became the first female rapper in a lead role to debut atop the chart. It also marked her second number-one song on the chart after "WAP". "Hiss" was the most US-centric global number-one song until that point, with 73% of its streams and 95% of its sales coming from the country. It debuted at number 104 on the Billboard Global Excl. US dated February 10, 2024, achieving 10.8 million streams outside the US within its first week of availability.

== Awards and nominations ==
Year	Ceremony	Category	Result	Ref.
2024	BET Awards	BET Her Award	Nominated	
2024	BET Hip Hop Awards	Impact Track	Nominated	

== Track listing ==
- Streaming/digital download
1. "Hiss" (explicit) – 3:12
2. "Hiss" (clean) – 3:12
3. "Hiss" (chopped 'n screwed; explicit) – 4:26
4. "Hiss" (chopped 'n screwed; clean) – 4:26
5. "Hiss" (instrumental) – 3:12
6. "Hiss" (DJ edit; explicit) – 2:55
7. "Hiss" (DJ edit; clean) – 2:55

== Charts ==
=== Weekly charts ===
Weekly chart performance
Chart (2024)	Peak position
Australia (ARIA)	62
Australia Hip Hop/R&B (ARIA)	12
Canada Hot 100 (Billboard)	18
Global 200 (Billboard)	1
Greece International (IFPI)	19
Ireland (IRMA)	36
Netherlands (Tipparade)	17
New Zealand Hot Singles (RMNZ)	2
Nigeria (TurnTable Top 100)	54
Portugal (AFP)	129
UK Singles (Official Charts)	31
UK Hip Hop/R&B (Official Charts)	9
UK Indie (Official Charts)	3
US Billboard Hot 100	1
US Hot R&B/Hip-Hop Songs (Billboard)	1
US R&B/Hip-Hop Airplay (Billboard)	40
US Rhythmic Airplay (Billboard)	34

=== Year-end charts ===
Year-end chart performance
Chart (2024)	Position
US Hot R&B/Hip-Hop Songs (Billboard)	62

== Certifications ==
Certifications and sales
Region	Certification	Certified units/sales
Canada (Music Canada)	Gold	40,000^{‡}
United States (RIAA)	Platinum	1,000,000^{‡}
^{‡} Sales+streaming figures based on certification alone.

== Release history ==
Release dates and formats
Region	Date	Format	Version	Label	Ref.
Various	January 26, 2024	Digital download; streaming	Original	Hot Girl	
Italy	January 30, 2024	Radio airplay	Original	Warner	
Various	January 31, 2024	Digital download; streaming	Chopped 'n screwed; instrumental	Hot Girl	
Various	February 1, 2024	Digital download; streaming	DJ edit	Hot Girl	

== See also ==
- List of Billboard Global 200 number ones of 2024
- List of Billboard Global 200 top-ten singles in 2024
- List of Billboard Hot 100 number ones of 2024
- List of Billboard Hot 100 number-one singles of the 2020s
- List of Billboard Hot 100 top-ten singles in 2024
- List of Billboard Digital Song Sales number ones of 2024
- List of Billboard Streaming Songs number ones of 2024
