= Savage (Megan Thee Stallion song) =

2020 single by Megan Thee Stallion

- Limited edition CD and vinyl cover. Other copies feature the same artwork with a blue background.

Single by Megan Thee Stallion

from the EP Suga
- Released: April 7, 2020
- Recorded: 2019
- Genre: Hip hop
- Length: 2:36
- Label: 1501 Certified; 300
- Songwriters: Megan Pete; Anthony White; Bobby Session Jr.
- Producer: J. White Did It

Megan Thee Stallion singles chronology
"Freak" (2020)	"Savage" (2020)	"Savage Remix" (2020)

Lyric video
- "Savage" on YouTube

Major Lazer remix cover

"Savage" is a song by American rapper-songwriter Megan Thee Stallion. It was released on March 6, 2020, as part of her EP Suga and later sent to US contemporary hit radio on April 7, 2020, by 1501 Certified Entertainment and 300 Entertainment as the third single from the EP. The song was written by the artist with Bobby Sessions, Akeasha Boodie, and producer J. White Did It. It went viral on video-sharing app TikTok, with people performing the "Savage" dance challenge during the song's chorus.

A remix featuring Beyoncé was surprise-released on April 29, 2020, and included on Megan's debut album Good News (2020). "Savage Remix" was met with widespread critical acclaim with praise for Megan and Beyoncé's chemistry and various delivery styles, as well as for fully transforming the song with new verses. The song reached number one on the US Billboard Hot 100 on May 26, 2020, becoming Megan Thee Stallion's first and Beyoncé's seventh number-one single on the chart.

The remix was critics' second-best song of 2020, with publications such as The New York Times, Slate, and The Ringer placing the song at number one on their year-end lists. The remix received two awards at the 63rd Annual Grammy Awards for Best Rap Performance and Best Rap Song. It was also nominated for Record of the Year. The song and its remix were met with global success, reaching the top ten in UK and Australia, top twenty in Canada, Portugal, Denmark and New Zealand, top thirty in France, Singapore and Austria and top forty in Germany. The song is certified gold in Italy, France and Poland, platinum in Brazil, and quadruple platinum in the US.

== Recording and production ==
According to engineer Eddie "eMIX" Hernandez, Megan did the song "on the spot", in under an hour. Hernandez explained the recording process: "The collaboration was going on at the same time. We were building as the song was forming. While he [producer J. White Did It] was laying down the snares and the kicks, she was writing to the skeleton of the beat. Once he had the production all ready and sent it over to me, she was ready to go. She had all her writing done. Her recording? She knocks them things out." White said that "it didn't take me more than 10, maybe 15 minutes tops" to produce the record. White described "Savage" as a "godsend", adding: "That song came out of the air man, it came out of the air from God... It was a gift. And straight away, I told her, 'This is going to be a number one record, watch.' When you know, you know."

== Composition ==
Candace McDuffie of Consequence of Sound noted, in the song, Megan "paints herself as 'the hood Mona Lisa' while celebrating her complexity." Megan employs huge bravado on the song, which, according to HipHopDX's Aaron McKrell, works to her advantage, as she "surgically pummels a formidable J. White Did It beat into submission, and still makes time for cool quips like \'I need a mop to clean the floor, it's too much drip, ooh\'." Complex's Jessica McKinney said the beat is "reminiscent of nostalgic hip-hop music videos set on a Miami beach, and its chorus is expressive, which is perfect for dancing."

== Critical reception ==
Consequence of Sound named "Savage" as one of the essential tracks off Suga. Complex's Jessica McKinney also named it a "stand-out track" from the EP. Vulture commented that the song was "joyfully conceited", and that previous single "'B.I.T.C.H.' is a little lightweight as a first single when there's heat like 'Savage' on deck". Rob Sheffield of Rolling Stone wrote that Megan is "at her absolute peak" and "on top". Following its release, The Fader's Salvatore Maicki named "Savage" one of the "10 songs you need in your life this week", saying Megan checks all of the boxes [classy, bougie, ratchet, sassy, moody, AND nasty] and "sounds fly as fuck while doing it". Vice's Kristin Corry listed it as one of the best songs for the month of March 2020, asserting that "with a hook that acknowledges all parts of her [Megan's] identity, just like each of her EPs introduces a new persona, it's no wonder the world fell in love with it".

== TikTok challenge ==
The "Savage" dance challenge was created by TikTok user Keara Wilson, whose viral clip racked up 15.7 million views and 2.4 million likes by March 20, 2020. Wilson posted her video for five days continuously, until it started going viral; on March 16, Megan posted her own video, as well as videos of her fans and celebrities performing the challenge. The challenge involves people completing a "quick and energetic" choreographed dance.

"Savage" was the most-played song on TikTok for March 2020, accumulating more than 7.5 billion views for the month.

== Music video ==
A Gracie Rothey-created lyric video premiered on April 7, 2020. It sees an animated Keara Wilson doing the TikTok dance she created, as the lyrics pass through on screen.

== Awards and nominations ==
Year	Awards	Category	Result	Ref.
2020	MTV Video Music Awards	Best Hip-Hop	Won	
2020	MTV Video Music Awards	Song of the Year	Nominated	
2020	People's Choice Awards	Song of 2020	Nominated	
2020	Soul Train Music Awards	Rhythm & Bars Award	Won	
2021	iHeartRadio Music Awards	TikTok Bop of the Year	Nominated	
2021	Shorty Awards	Entertainment	Won	

== Track listing ==
Digital download and streaming

1. "Savage" – 2:35

Digital download and streaming – Beyoncé Remix

1. "Savage Remix" (featuring Beyoncé) – 4:02

Digital download and streaming – Major Lazer Remix

1. "Savage Remix" (featuring Major Lazer) – 4:59

CD single

1. "Savage" – 2:35
2. "Savage" (Clean)– 2:35

== Charts ==
=== Weekly charts ===
Chart (2020)	Peak position
Argentina Hot 100 (Billboard)	95
Australia (ARIA)	4
Austria (Ö3 Austria Top 40)	23
Canada (Canadian Hot 100)	16
Canada CHR/Top 40 (Billboard)	13
Canada Hot AC (Billboard)	34
Czech Republic Singles Digital (ČNS IFPI)	20
Denmark (Tracklisten)	16
Estonia (Eesti Tipp-40)	15
France (SNEP)	26
Germany (GfK)	33
Global 200 (Billboard)	52
Hungary (Stream Top 40)	8
Iceland (Tónlistinn)	23
Ireland (IRMA)	3
Italy (FIMI)	42
Lithuania (AGATA)	16
Netherlands (Single Top 100)	67
New Zealand (Recorded Music NZ)	12
Portugal (AFP)	11
Romania (Airplay 100)	51
Scottish Singles Sales (Official Charts)	12
Singapore (RIAS)	26
Slovakia Singles Digital (ČNS IFPI)	20
Sweden (Sverigetopplistan)	16
Switzerland (Schweizer Hitparade)	18
UK Singles (Official Charts)	3
UK Hip Hop/R&B (Official Charts)	14
US Billboard Hot 100	4
US Hot R&B/Hip-Hop Songs (Billboard)	4
US R&B/Hip-Hop Airplay (Billboard)	1
US Pop Airplay (Billboard)	8
US Rhythmic Airplay (Billboard)	1
US Rolling Stone Top 100	1

=== Year-end charts ===
Chart (2020)	Position
Australia (ARIA)	40
Hungary (Stream Top 40)	63
Ireland (IRMA)	35
UK Singles (OCC)	36

== Certifications ==
Region	Certification	Certified units/sales
Belgium (BRMA)	Gold	20,000^{‡}
Brazil (Pro-Música Brasil)	Platinum	40,000^{‡}
France (SNEP)	Gold	100,000^{‡}
Italy (FIMI)	Gold	35,000^{‡}
New Zealand (RMNZ)	3× Platinum	90,000^{‡}
Poland (ZPAV)	Platinum	50,000^{‡}
Portugal (AFP)	Gold	5,000^{‡}
United Kingdom (BPI)	Platinum	600,000^{‡}
United States (RIAA)	6× Platinum	6,000,000^{‡}
^{‡} Sales+streaming figures based on certification alone.

== Release history ==
Region	Date	Format	Label	Ref.
United States	April 7, 2020	Contemporary hit radio	1501 Certified; 300	

== Beyoncé remix ==
"Savage Remix"

Single by Megan Thee Stallion featuring Beyoncé
- Released: April 29, 2020
- Recorded: 2020
- Genre: Hip hop
- Length: 4:02
- Label: 1501 Certified; 300
- Composer: Anthony White
- Lyricists: Beyoncé; Megan Pete; Bobby Session Jr.; Derrick Milano; Terius Nash; Jorden Thorpe; Shawn Carter; Brittany Hazzard
- Producer: J. White Did It

Megan Thee Stallion singles chronology
"Savage" (2020)	"Savage Remix" (2020)	"RNB" (2020)

Beyoncé singles chronology
"Brown Skin Girl" (2019)	"Savage Remix" (2020)	"Black Parade" (2020)

Lyric video
- "Savage Remix" on YouTube

On April 29, 2020, a remix featuring American singer-songwriter Beyoncé was released. It was later included on Megan Thee Stallion's debut album, Good News. All proceeds of the song benefit Bread of Life Houston's COVID-19 relief efforts, which includes providing over 14 tons of food and supplies to 500 families and 100 senior citizens in Houston weekly.

=== Production and release ===
Megan Thee Stallion and Beyoncé, both natives of Houston, Texas, first met each other at a New Year's Eve party in 2019. Megan recalled when she first learned that Beyoncé would remix the song: "I got a call one day and they were like, 'Yeah… Beyoncé's gonna do a remix of 'Savage' [...] I was like, 'Shut the f— up!' I didn't believe it." She explained she kept the surprise to herself, "respecting Beyoncé's method of working in silence." She explained the significance of the collaboration to herself, saying: "You grow up and you friggin' watch Destiny's Child, and you go to the rodeo to see them perform. You don't grow up and think you're gonna meet Be-yon-cé!"

The remix was written and recorded remotely. Songwriter The-Dream said that Beyoncé "always knows what she wants to say", which depends on "how she's feeling at the moment about whatever's going on in the world, what's going on in the culture, musically where she's trying to go". Beyoncé would then delegate sections to different songwriters. The-Dream added: "Most of the times when you hear something, it's not about that particular thing. It's about where we're going next."

J. White Did It, the producer of the original "Savage", spoke about how he did not know about Beyoncé's remix until the day of release. White said:

"I heard about it an hour before it was about to come out. I was just as shocked as you. I didn't know. All she [Megan] texted me was, like, 'I got fire for you.' I was like, 'what?' She said, 'I can't tell you.' She was like, 'I can't tell you yet, I can't tell you nothin.' That was tearing me up because I don't really like surprises. The first time we all heard the remix, we all heard it together... I sat there and heard the song and was literally like "WOW." Great song! This is really, really good. "Savage" has now arrived on the remix level, let's go! The song was already doing good by itself, but that remix… it took it to a whole new level."

A snippet of the remix leaked online on the same day of its release, and was then quickly uploaded on Tidal.

=== Composition ===
Brooke Marine of W magazine noted "the remix itself is essentially an entirely new song, with the exception of the chorus which has remained the same." The remix finds Beyoncé rapping two full verses, as well as providing backing vocals. She raps in the flow established by Megan, while employing her "signature tongue-in-cheek lyricism to convey a message of female empowerment." Kiana Fitzgerald of Texas Monthly said Megan sounds "strikingly similar to the late Houston legend Big Moe, who was well known for his evocative singing."

The remix starts off with Megan Thee Stallion's first verse, whereafter Beyoncé gives a "cheeky verse and masterful delivery", with, as noted by Insider's Callie Ahlgrim, "sharp, racy bars about women stripping on late-night Instagram livestreams, a phenomenon known as 'Demon Time', and a subscription service known for nude photos called OnlyFans." Beyoncé goes on to rap about her "famous posterior": "If you don't jump to put jeans on, baby, you don't feel my pain." She also alludes to the song's popularity on TikTok with the line "Hips tick-tock when I dance." Toward the end of the song, both artists take turns singing and rapping, with Beyoncé returning to "her usual heavenly vocals." Producer J. White Did It's beat is reworked on the remix to include minor instrumental changes, including an extended air horn in the background during Beyoncé's first verse, and a flattened soundscape during her second verse, which, as noted by Texas Monthly's Kiana Fitzgerald, gives "Bey ample space to work with". Fitzgerald further noted Megan's confidence, as she "sounds like her usual captivating self, but she sounds tighter and deeper in her pocket alongside Bey".

=== Critical reception ===
"Savage Remix" received critical acclaim. Jessica McKinney of Complex wrote that "there was no other moment in music this year that demanded the collective attention of popular culture when it dropped like the "Savage" remix did." Lindsay Zoladz of The New York Times described the song as "an all-out anthem" and Beyoncé's "coronating co-sign of Megan Thee Stallion — the defining artist of a year that seemed a never-ending showcase for her bravado, poise and finely calibrated fury". Zoladz continued: "'Savage' is so much more than a meme, an Instagram caption, a TikTok dance: It is a joyous assertion of Black female personhood in a world that needed it as desperately as water". Tatiana Cirisano of Billboard agreed, noting that seeing "two Black female performers with the same hometown (one an established star, the other rapidly rising)" collaborate on a song about self-love which then reached number one on the Billboard Hot 100 "is a resonant celebration of Black womanhood". Mankaprr Conteh of Pitchfork wrote that on "Savage Remix", Megan and Beyoncé "owned their sex appeal, their smarts, and their success, inviting you to own yours, too", and concluded: "After Megan had been shot, mocked, and gaslit, the 'Savage Remix' evolved from a confident anthem to an assertion of her complex, endangered humanity."

Critics praised how the remix fully transforms the song with new verses. Pitchfork named the remix "Best New Track", stating that "Beyoncé upgrades the original from a good song to a multi-dimensional one." Michael Cuby of Nylon described the song as a "made-for-the-history-books smash", stating that the remix is a throwback to when artists would completely reinvent their songs on remixes rather than simply adding a guest feature. Similarly, Craig Jenkins of Vulture described how Beyoncé and Megan "brought back the lost art of a killer remix", adding that "it's so rare in this era for a remix to feel like an event and not just a few new words plopped onto an existing song." Jon Caramanica for The New York Times described the track as "fantastic, far more involved and intricate than most blink-and-you'll-miss-it collaborations." Crack Magazine's Sydney Gore said the song is "playful, whip-smart and, crucially, reminded us of the potency of a well-executed remix" and adding that "it felt like a member of Houston royalty was passing the torch to the next generation".

Critics also praised Megan and Beyoncé's chemistry and various delivery styles. Vulture wrote that they "fit together like a perfect puzzle: Megan sounds audacious and unflinching, while Beyoncé is effortlessly smooth", adding that they "make the song into a game of lyrical one-upwomanship, with each line they spit being more quotable or head-turning than the last." Brittany Spanos of Rolling Stone noted Beyoncé's "angelic, whisper-y runs" and "untouchable" wordplay, and praised the duo's chemistry, writing: "Together, the pair are an unstoppable force of Houston bravado and empowerment that will boost your serotonin levels just enough to have hope for a world beyond this pandemic." Writing for GQ, Max Cea called the pairing "a natural fit" whose "styles complement each others': Beyoncé's breathy flutterings punctuate Megan's gusto; Megan's snappy choruses act as a sturdy platform for Beyoncé's various modes (singing, rapping, growling, seductively whispering)." Jael Goldfine from Paper declared the song "a perfect reminder that Beyoncé is a gifted rapper, whether taking control or backing Meg up with sexy little 'Okay-okays', and 'them jeans, them jeans'." Kiana Fitzgerald for Texas Monthly praised the remix as a track that "pairs Megan's insuppressible, ebullient energy with Beyoncé's perfectionist work ethic, and benefits their shared hometown of Houston", where "Megan, an upstart MC, and Beyoncé, a cemented veteran, came together as artists from south Houston to represent something greater: the fact that they're fully realized women, with lives that mirror those of their listeners despite the difference in their respective lifestyles."

==== Year-end lists ====
"Savage Remix" was the second-most acclaimed song of 2020, with Lindsey Zoladz of The New York Times, Slate, The Ringer, and Crack Magazine placing it at number one on their year-end lists.

"Savage Remix" on year-end lists
Publication	List	Rank	Ref.
Apple Music	The 100 Best Songs of 2020	Placed	
Billboard	The Top 100 Best Songs of 2020	3	
The Citizen	The Best Songs of 2020	Placed	
Complex	The Best Songs of 2020	2	
Consequence of Sound	Top 50 Songs of 2020	8	
Crack Magazine	The Top 25 Tracks of the Year	1	
The Current	Jay Gabler's Top 10 Songs of 2020	Placed	
E! News	The 20 Best Songs of 2020	Placed	
The Fader	The 100 Best Songs of 2020	3	
The Guardian	The 20 Best Songs of 2020	4	
Glamour	The Best Songs of 2020	Placed	
HipHopDX	The Best Rap Songs of 2020	Placed	
Idolator	The 100 Best Pop Songs of 2020	1	
Idolator	The 15 Best Remixes of 2020	1	
iHeartRadio	The 30 Songs That Made Us Feel Something In 2020	11	
Insider	The 30 Best Songs of 2020	2	
Los Angeles Times	The 50 Best Songs of 2020	Placed	
The New York Times	Lindsey Zoladz's Best Songs of 2020	1	
The New York Times	Jon Caramanica's Best Songs of 2020	7	
NME	The 50 Best Songs of 2020	Placed	
NPR	NPR's 100 Best Songs of 2020	3	
Pitchfork	The 100 Best Songs of 2020	4	
Pitchfork	The 36 Best Rap Songs of 2020	Placed	
The Plain Dealer	The Best Songs of 2020	14	
Refinery29	The Best Songs of 2020	Listed	
The Ringer	The Best Songs of 2020	1	
Rolling Stone	The 50 Best Songs of 2020	12	
Rolling Stone	Rob Sheffield's Top 25 Songs of 2020	5	
Rolling Stone	The Best Pop Collaborations of 2020	Placed	
Rolling Stone	500 Greatest Songs of All Time	438	
Shondaland	The Best Music of 2020	Placed	
Slate	The Best Songs of 2020	1	
Spotify	The Best Hip-Hop Songs of 2020	8	
Stereogum	The Top 40 Pop Songs Of 2020	7	
Tampa Bay Times	The 30 Best Songs of 2020	6	
Thrillist	The Best Songs of 2020	Placed	
Time	The Best Songs of 2020	Placed	
Uproxx	The 50 Best Songs of 2020	4	
Uproxx	The 2020 Uproxx Music Critics Poll: The Best Songs Of The Year	4	
Vulture	The Best Songs of 2020	3	
XXL	The Best Hip-Hop Songs of 2020	Placed	

=== Commercial performance ===
The original version reached a peak of number 14 for the week ending on May 2, 2020. Following the release of the remix in the middle of the tracking week, the song reached a new peak of number four the following week, aided by the remix's sales and streams. After a full tracking week, the remix climbed to number two on the Billboard Hot 100 on the chart dated May 16, 2020, becoming Megan Thee Stallion's highest-peaking song and Beyoncé's 19th top 10 entry on the Hot 100 as a solo artist. This marked the first time four black women occupied the top two spots of the Hot 100 chart, with Doja Cat's "Say So" remix featuring Nicki Minaj at number one. The song topped the Hot Rap Songs chart the same week, becoming both Megan Thee Stallion and Beyoncé's first number one on the chart. The track also topped the Streaming Songs chart, receiving 42.1 million US streams, up 53% from the previous week. Due to the strong sales and streams that the remix received in its first full week, Megan Thee Stallion's Suga EP reached a new peak of number seven on the Billboard 200, with 39,000 equivalent-album units moved for the chart dated May 16, 2020.

"Savage Remix" reached number one on the Billboard Hot 100 on the chart dated May 30, 2020, becoming Megan Thee Stallion's first and Beyoncé's seventh number-one single as a solo artist, and eleventh as member of Destiny’s Child. Beyoncé became the second act in history after Mariah Carey to top the Hot 100 in four decades (1990s, 2000s, 2010s, 2020s) when including group chart appearances. The song also topped the Digital Songs chart the same week, selling 30,000 downloads, up 55% from the previous week, becoming Megan Thee Stallion's first and Beyoncé's eighth number-one. According to Rolling Stone, the song had accumulated over 2.1 million units in the US by July 2, 2020. As of July 29, 2020, the song had sold over 3 million units in the US. The remix placed at No. 15 on the Billboard year-end list for 2020.

Elsewhere, "Savage Remix" debuted at number two on the Official New Zealand Music Chart on May 11, 2020. In Canada, "Savage" reached a peak of number nine, becoming Megan The Stallion's first top ten and Beyoncé's 15th as a solo artist in the country.

=== Live performances ===
Megan Thee Stallion performed the "Savage Remix" at the BET Awards 2020, with the set being inspired by the Mad Max franchise. Brendan Wetmore of Paper wrote that the performance "shut down the show" and "despite being pre-recorded and edited, still manages to evoke the same raw emotion of Megan's live show." Vulture later named this the second best live performance of 2020. Megan also performed the song on the season premiere of Saturday Night Live, featuring Beyoncé's pre-recorded vocals. The performance paid tribute to the Black Lives Matter movement, with recordings of Malcolm X and Tamika Mallory being played and Megan condemning Attorney General of Kentucky Daniel Cameron for not bringing justice after the police killing of Breonna Taylor. Megan performed a medley of the "Savage Remix" and "Body" on The Late Late Show with James Corden on December 10, 2020. The performance paid tribute to Megan and Beyoncé's hometown of Houston, with Megan and her dancers performing in a rodeo arena and wearing orange chaps. Zoe Haylock of Vulture described the performance as "flawless", adding that Megan "thought she'd show you how she'd absolutely destroy a Super Bowl halftime performance." In 2023, Beyoncé included the "Savage Remix" on the setlist of her Renaissance World Tour. On the September 23, 2023 show of the tour, Megan joined Beyoncé on stage in their hometown of Houston at NRG Stadium to perform the song together for the first time.

=== TikTok challenge ===
New TikTok challenges were made for the song, including by the original "Savage" dance challenge creator, Keara Wilson. Challenges were also created by Cassidy Condie, as well as Shayné & Zhané Stanley, aka the Nae Nae Twins. Unlike Keara's version, which uses the song's intro, these dances use the second verse. Megan reposted both of their viral dances on her Instagram page and posted a video of herself doing the one created by Shayné and Zhané.

In December 2020, TikTok announced that "Savage Remix" was the second-most popular song on the platform of the year.

=== Impact ===
Houston Mayor Sylvester Turner announced that both Megan and Beyoncé would receive their own day in Houston, with Turner acknowledging "both artists' contributions to uplifting our communities, holding down H-Town, & for helping us remain Houston Strong." The charity also saw a significant boost in donations, with over 500 new donors in the first 24 hours after the song's release. According to Vibe, the track had reportedly raised $500,000 for Bread of Life Houston's COVID-19 relief efforts as of May 2020.

The subscription content service OnlyFans, which Beyoncé referenced in the remix, saw a 15% spike in traffic after the track's release. Ottilie Landmark and Ryan White of I-D wrote that the track "immortalised the platform in history." Ana Valens of The Daily Dot wrote that the song brought the platform into the public lexicon, and "kicked up popular interest" in the platform within the media and people searching for income during the COVID-19 pandemic's economic crisis. OnlyFans CEO Tim Stokely stated the app was "seeing about 200,000 new users every 24 hours and 7,000 to 8,000 new creators joining every day" after the release of the remix.

Virginia-based dancer Morgan Bullock went viral on social media for performing Irish stepdance to the remix. Despite receiving racist comments due to Bullock being a black woman performing a traditional Irish dance, she received praise and support from admirers including Riverdance creator Bill Whelan and Beyoncé's mother Tina Knowles, and was invited to perform in Ireland by Taoiseach Leo Varadkar.

Caitlin Kelley for Forbes opined that the remix set the precedent for "the dawn of TikTok remixes" and "reinforces the app's hold on the charts."

=== Awards and nominations ===
"Savage Remix" received three nominations at the 63rd Annual Grammy Awards: Record of the Year, Best Rap Performance and Best Rap Song, of which it won the latter two. Megan and Beyoncé become the first female artists to win in the Best Rap Performance category in Grammy history. The song's nomination in the category marked the first time in 23 years that an all-female collaboration was nominated in this category or its forerunner categories. With the song's nomination for Best Rap Song, "Savage Remix" marked the first time an all-female collaboration has been nominated in this category. Its nomination for Record of the Year marked the third all-female collaboration to be nominated in this category in Grammy history. The song's nomination for Record of the Year also marked Beyoncé's seventh nomination in this category, making Beyoncé the most nominated female artist and the joint most nominated artist (tied with Frank Sinatra) in this category in Grammy history. Beyoncé also became the second artist (after Pharrell Williams) to receive two Record of the Year nominations in one year, with "Black Parade" being her other nomination, as well as the sixth artist to be nominated in this category in three different decades (2000s, 2010s and 2020s), after Paul Simon, Paul McCartney, Frank Sinatra, Barbra Streisand, and John Lennon. In her acceptance speech for Record of the Year, Billie Eilish dedicated the award to "Savage Remix" and said that it deserved to win over "Everything I Wanted".

"Savage Remix" was the most awarded song at the 2020 BET Hip Hop Awards, with the track winning Best Collaboration and Beyoncé winning Best Featured Verse.

Year	Awards	Category	Result	Ref.
2020	BET Hip Hop Awards	Song of the Year	Nominated	
2020	BET Hip Hop Awards	Best Collaboration	Won	
2020	BET Hip Hop Awards	Sweet 16: Best Featured Verse	Won	
2020	American Music Awards	Collaboration of the Year	Nominated	
2020	HipHopDX Awards	Best Hip Hop Collab of 2020	Nominated	
2020	HipHopDX Awards	Best Rap Verse of 2020	Nominated	
2020	MTV Video Music Awards	Song of Summer	Nominated	
2020	People's Choice Awards	Collaboration Song of 2020	Nominated	
2021	ASCAP Pop Awards	Most Performed Songs	Won	
2021	ASCAP Rhythm & Soul Music Awards	Winning R&B/Hip-Hop & Rap Songs	Won	
2021	Grammy Awards	Record of the Year	Nominated	
2021	Grammy Awards	Best Rap Performance	Won	
2021	Grammy Awards	Best Rap Song	Won	
2021	NAACP Image Awards	Outstanding Duo, Group or Collaboration (Contemporary)	Won	
2021	NAACP Image Awards	Outstanding Hip Hop/Rap Song	Won	
2021	iHeartRadio Music Awards	Best Collaboration	Won	
2021	iHeartRadio Music Awards	Hip-Hop Song of the Year	Nominated	
2021	BET Awards	Coca-Cola Viewers' Choice Award	Won	
2021	Rockbjörnen	Foreign Song of the Year	Nominated	

=== Personnel ===
Credits adapted from YouTube Music.

- Megan Pete – Lead vocals, Background vocals, Songwriter
- Beyoncé Giselle Knowles-Carter – Lead vocals, Background vocals, Vocal production, Songwriter
- Anthony White - Producer, Songwriter
- Jorden Kyle Lanier Thorpe - Songwriter
- Terius Nash - Songwriter
- Bobby Sessions Jr - Songwriter
- Brittany Hazzard - Songwriter
- Derrick Milano - Songwriter
- S. Carter - Songwriter
- Steven "Steve-O" Carless - A&R Direction
- Mariel Gomerez - A&R Direction
- Ricky Lawson - A&R Direction
- Selim Bouab - A&R Direction
- Daniel "Julez" Smith Sr. - A&R Direction
- Jonah Rappaport - A&R, 300 Entertainment
- Colin Leonard - Mastering Engineer
- Stuart White - Mixing Engineer, Recording Engineer
- Eddie “eMIX” Hernández - Recording Engineer
- Jaycen Joshua - Mixing
- Shawn "Source" Jarrett - Engineer

=== Charts ===
==== Weekly charts ====
Weekly chart performance for "Savage Remix"
Chart (2020)	Peak position
Argentina Hot 100 (Billboard)	58
Belgium (Ultratop 50 Flanders)	35
Belgium (Ultratop 50 Wallonia)	50
Canada Hot 100 (Billboard)	9
Euro Digital Song Sales (Billboard)	20
Global 200 (Billboard)	52
Italy (FIMI)	28
Lithuania (AGATA)	18
Netherlands (Dutch Top 40 Tipparade)	6
Netherlands (Single Top 100)	28
New Zealand (Recorded Music NZ)	2
Norway (VG-lista)	17
Singapore (RIAS)	28
US Billboard Hot 100	1
US Adult Pop Airplay (Billboard)	38
US Dance Airplay (Billboard)	6
US Hot R&B/Hip-Hop Songs (Billboard)	1
US Pop Airplay (Billboard)	7
US Rhythmic Airplay (Billboard)	1
US Rolling Stone Top 100	1

==== Year-end charts ====
2020 year-end chart performance for "Savage Remix"
Chart (2020)	Position
Canada (Canadian Hot 100)	43
New Zealand (Recorded Music NZ)	34
US Billboard Hot 100	15
US Dance/Mix Show Airplay (Billboard)	30
US Hot R&B/Hip-Hop Songs (Billboard)	7
US Mainstream Top 40 (Billboard)	29
US Rhythmic (Billboard)	7

=== Certifications ===
Region	Certification	Certified units/sales
Brazil (Pro-Música Brasil)	2× Platinum	80,000^{‡}
Canada (Music Canada)	5× Platinum	400,000^{‡}
Denmark (IFPI Danmark)	Gold	45,000^{‡}
New Zealand (RMNZ)	Platinum	30,000^{‡}
Norway (IFPI Norway)	Gold	30,000^{‡}
^{‡} Sales+streaming figures based on certification alone.

=== Release history ===
Region	Date	Formats	Labels	Ref.
Various	April 29, 2020	Digital download; streaming	1501 Certified; 300	

== See also ==
- List of Billboard Hot 100 number ones of 2020
- List of Billboard Hot 100 number-one singles of the 2020s
- List of Billboard Hot 100 top-ten singles in 2020
- List of Billboard Digital Song Sales number ones of 2020
- List of Billboard Streaming Songs number ones of 2020
