= Yuki Chiba =

Japanese rapper and singer (born 1990)

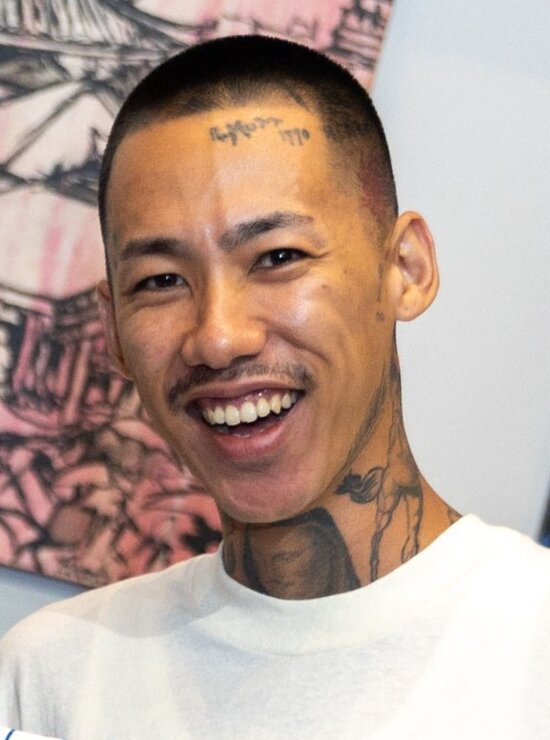
- Chiba in 2024

Background information
- Also known as: Kohh; Yellow T20
- Born: 千葉雄喜 (Yūki Chiba); April 22, 1990 (age 36); Oji, Kita, Tokyo, Japan
- Genres: Hip hop; trap
- Occupations: Rapper; singer; songwriter
- Years active: 2008–present
- Labels: Gunsmith Production; Columbia; RYCE Entertainment (China)
- Website: kohh.tokyo

Yuki Chiba (千葉雄喜, Chiba Yūki; born April 22, 1990), formerly known by his stage name Kohh, is a Japanese rapper, singer, and songwriter.

== Early life ==
Chiba was born in Oji, Kita, Tokyo, Japan. He was raised by a single mother along with his younger brother, a fellow rapper known as Lil Kohh. His Korean father, whose Korean surname (고 / Koh) became the basis of Chiba's stage name, died by suicide after jumping off an apartment building while high on drugs. Chiba's mother struggled with an addiction to methamphetamine. Chiba grew up around violence and drugs along with his crew of local friends.

== Career ==
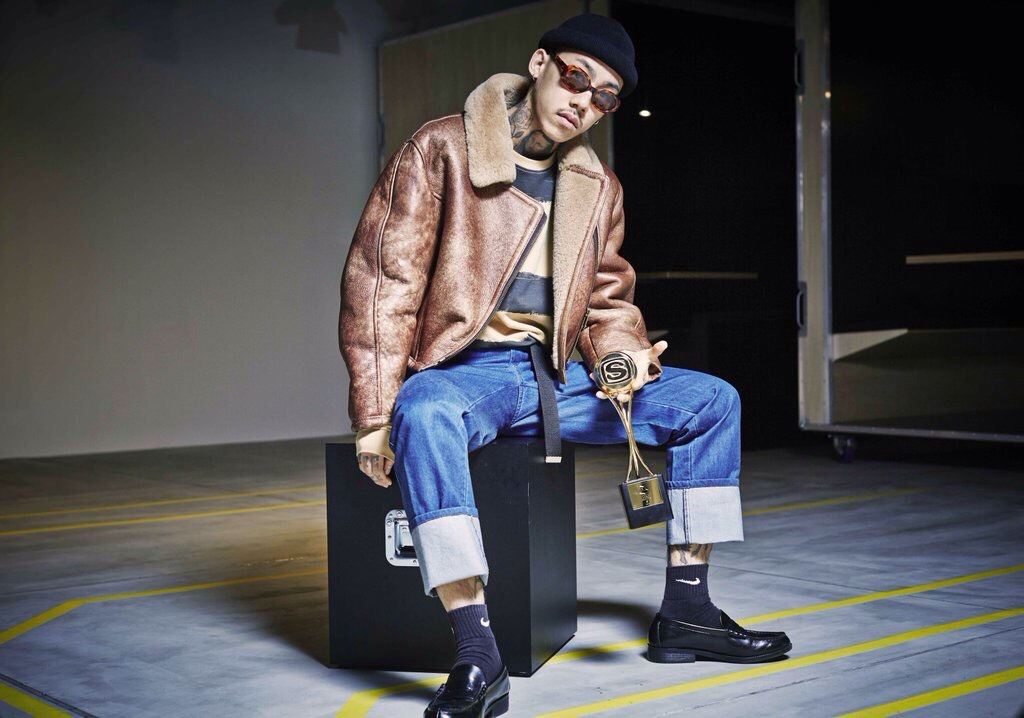
Chiba in 2016

Chiba started producing and recording music at the age of 18 with while making various mixtapes, until he met producer 318 and started releasing material under the label Gunsmith Production. He saw an early underground success within the sub-urban Japanese scene when he produced Lil Kohh's song "Young Forever". The accompanying music video went viral in Japan.

In 2014, Chiba released his major 2nd studio album titled Monochrome. The album was a fair success among the urban acts and its lead track "I don't mind if I'm poor" (Japanese: 貧乏なんて気にしない, Hepburn: Binbō nante Kinishinai) had a big reception on YouTube.

In 2015, KOHH along with Japanese artist Loota collaborated with Keith Ape's track "It G Ma" (잊지마) which became a major hit single in Japan and South Korea apart from gaining international media attention. Back in Japan, Kohh resumed his work and continued working on his album Dirt after releasing his delayed first album 梔子 (Gardenia). Dirt was released on October 28. The album was also released internationally via iTunes in October 23. Chiba was featured along with OG Maco on the track "Buchiagari" by Japanese DJ Ryow.

In 2016, Kohh collaborated with Frank Ocean on the single "Nikes", available on the physical album copy of Blonde. Chiba was featured in a song by Japanese American singer Hikaru Utada, titled "Bōkyaku", from their sixth Japanese album Fantôme.

In 2018, Chiba was featured in an exclusive bonus track "Runway", in the Japanese iTunes version of Mariah Carey's Caution album.

Chiba's fifth studio album Untitled was released by Nippon Columbia on February 2, 2019.

In 2021, Chiba retired the moniker Kohh, choosing to go by his birth name Yuki Chiba. He would later state in 2024 that he would no longer be performing any songs from the era as well. Chiba took a three-year career break before returning on February 12, 2024. He uploaded an official music video called "Team Tomodachi" (チーム友達), which went viral. Team Tomodachi has had multiple remixes with other artists such as Duke Deuce, ¥ellow Bucks, Jin Dogg, Bun B, Watson, and many more.

Chiba was featured on American rapper Megan Thee Stallion's 2024 track "Mamushi" from her album Megan. The song went viral on social media and became Chiba's first-ever entry into the US Billboard Hot 100 at number 68. He made his US TV debut at the 2024 MTV Video Music Awards when he performed the song alongside Megan Thee Stallion.

In November 2024, American artist Will Smith released his own remix of "Team Tomodachi", marking one of the highest-profile Western collaborations on the track. Smith announced the remix to his 70 million Instagram followers, later sharing a video teaser that amassed over 3.5 million views.

In September 2026, Chiba released the ending theme of the JoJo's Bizarre Adventure Part 7: Steel Ball Run anime titled "Dead or Alive." The reception to this song was majorly negative, with fans claiming that Chiba's style didn't fit with the theme of the anime attached to it, as well of it breaking tradition as the previous ending themes were western songs.

== Reception ==
Chiba has been mentioned several times as a major influential force to the Japanese hip hop scene in recent years. Chiba has occasionally criticized how small the hip hop scene is in Japan and has tackled major mainstream TVs for its negligence of noticing hip hop. Chiba has also been praised for his smart use of topics like drug use and violence within the Japanese society which are considered controversial in the country. After being featured in "잊지마" (It G Ma, Korean for "don't forget"), KOHH received even bigger praise from international audiences who recognized his use of the phrase 'Arigatō' (Japanese for "Thank you") in his verse as one of the highlights of the hit Korean-Japanese collaboration and praised the artist, whose performance on the track helped launch his career. M-flo's Taku Takahashi has appointed Chiba as one of the main acts in the Japanese hip hop renaissance.

Several videos featuring Chiba have gone viral on social media like YouTube, Facebook and Vine among others.

== Discography ==
=== Studio albums ===
Title	Album details	Oricon chart
Monochrome	Released: July 30, 2014; Label: Gunsmith Productions; Formats: CD, digital download	57
梔子 (Gardenia)	Released: January 1, 2015; Label: Gunsmith Productions; Formats: CD, digital download	26
Dirt II	Released: June 17, 2016; Label: Gunsmith Productions; Formats: CD, digital download	38
Untitled	Released: February 2, 2019; Label: Nippon Columbia; Formats: CD, digital download	80
Worst	Released: April 29, 2020; Label: Nippon Columbia; Formats: CD, digital download	12
The Lost Tapes	Released: September 25, 2022; Formats: Digital download	—
Team Tomodachi (The Remixes)	Released: 2024; Formats: Digital download	—
Star	Released: December 11, 2024; Formats: Digital download	—
"—" denotes releases that did not chart or were not released in that region.

=== Mixtapes ===
List of mixtapes, with selected deals

Title	Details
Yellow Tape	Released: November 28, 2012; Collection of Chiba lead songs and features
Yellow Tape 2	Released: August 31, 2013; Collection of Chiba lead songs and features
Yellow Tape 3	Released: June 30, 2015; Collection of Chiba lead songs and features
Yellow Tape 4	Released: December 20, 2016; Collection of Chiba lead songs and features
Complete Collection 1	Released: May 20, 2015
Complete Collection 2	Released: May 20, 2015

=== Singles ===
==== As lead artist ====
Title	Year	Album
"十人十色" (Chiba, Tokarev, PETZ)	2013	Non-album single
"Ballin" (Chiba, SD and SKY-Hi)	2014	Concrete Green the Chicago Alliance
"Chiraq 2 Japan" (Chiba, Lil Herb, Seeda and Norikiyo)	2014	Non-album singles
"Fight for Tokyo" (Giragiraガールズ, 巌, MEGA-G, MC漢, MC SHOW, MCクローバー, Y'S, YOUNG HASTLE, KOHH, LOOTA, EGO, 海, エリカ)	2014	Non-album singles
"Hope – Tokyo Tribe Anthem (Tribes United Version)" (海, 巌, MC漢, MEGA-G, GIRAGIRAガールズ, D.O, T2K, Y'S, KOHH, 十影, YOUNG HASTLE, VITO FOCCACIO, LOOTA, EGO, MC SHOW)	2014	Non-album singles
"Paris (Sam Tiba Remix)"	2016	Homieland Vol. 2
"No Makeup"	2021	Yellow Tape 5
"Team Tomodachi (チーム友達)"	2024	Non-album singles
"Shinpai Muyou" (Valorant)	2025	Non-album singles

==== As featured artist ====
Title	Year	Album	Notes
"Gimme the Lights" (DJ Tatsuki & DJ Chari featuring Yuki, Kohh, and Young Freez)	2012	A.C.E. Time 2nd Season	
"I Need Her Remix" (Vito (Squash Squad) featuring Nipps, Kohh and Cherry Brown)	2012	Yellow Tape	
"New Days Move (Remix)" (Aklo featuring Salu, Staxx T(Cream), Kohh & Shingo☆西成)	2012	Non-album singles	
"G.O.L.D" (DJ Ken Watanabe featuring Kohh)	2013	Non-album singles	
"G.O.L.D Part 2" (DJ Ken Watanabe featuring Kohh, Kayzabro and The Y's)	2013	Non-album singles	
"Don't Stop Remix" (DJ Ryow featuring DJ Ty-Koh, Kohh, Dizzle and Socks)	2013	Non-album singles	
"Bank to Bank" (Anarchy featuring Kohh)	2013	DGKA (Dirty Ghetto King Anarchy)	
"Hate That Booty" (Zeebra featuring Y's and Kohh)	2013	25 To Life	
"Somewhere" (Loota featuring Kohh)	2013	Dessin	
"Boyfriend #2 (Remix)" (Kowichi featuring Young Hastle, Kohh and DJ Ty-Koh)	2014	The Diner	
"プリンス" (Y's featuring Kohh, Mony Horse, and Jigg)	2014	Love Hate Power	
"Turn Up" (DJ Ryow featuring Kohh, Smith-CN and Zeebra)	2014	#Idwt – In Dreams We Trust	
"Hiroi sekai" (Relax Rekords featuring Kohh, J $tash, and Young Sachi)	2014	Relax Gang Vol. 1	
"aaight" (DJ Souljah featuring Kohh, Maria (Simi Lab))	2014	Non-album single	
"Break the Records (Remix)" (AKLO featuring Kohh & 漢)	2014	The Arrival	
"I'm So High" (T.O.P. featuring Kohh)	2014	Underworld Anatomy	
"Moon Child" (Anarchy featuring Kohh)	2014	New Yankee	
" #ヤッチャッタ" (Minmi featuring Kohh)	2015	New Minmi Friends -"Bad" "Minmi" To Iu Neta wo Rapper Track Maker Ga Douryouri Shitanoka-	
"ピラミッド" (Salu & the dreambandgunjo featuring Kohh)	2015	The Calm	
"Troy" (Lord 8erz featuring Kohh, 三島, and RAW-T)	2015	8ERZ EP	
"Lollipop (DJ KM Remix)" (JOYSTICKK featuring Kohh)	2015	Non-album single	
"Tomareranai" (JOE IRON featuring Kohh, Steelo and Yuki a.K.A. Juto)	2015	Yellow Tape 1	
"チョーヤバイ" (GOKU GREEN featuring Kohh and MonyHorse)	2015	Yellow Tape 2	
"Hood rich" (J $tash featuring Kohh)	2015	Yellow Tape 3	
"般若 (Kazoku)" [(Hannya) 家族 feat. Chiba]	2015	Yellow Tape 3	
"잊지마 (It G Ma)" (Keith Ape featuring JayAllday, loota, Okasian, Kohh)	2015	Yellow Tape 3	
"Mix Grillz" (DJ☆GO featuring Kohh and HORI)	2015	Best for Crusing	
"Let Me Know" (タイプライター&YMG featuring AK-69 and Kohh)	2015	La La Palooza	
"Don't Get Me Started" (J $tash featuring Kohh)	2015	Hood Rich	
"24 7" (Brandon Thomas featuring Kohh)	2015	Good Things Take Time Vol. 3	
"Buchiagari" (DJ RYOW featuring Kohh and OG Maco)	2015	Non-album single	
"Break'em All" (TeddyLoid featuring Kohh)	2015	Silent Planet	
"Bash" (SOCKS featuring Kohh)	2015	Never Dream This Man	
"All In" (Dumbfoundead featuring CA$HPASSION and Kohh)	2016	We Might Die	
"Air Force 1" (Barry Chen featuring Kenzy and Kohh)	2016	Rocking Gold	
"Bōkyaku" (Hikaru Utada featuring Kohh)	2016	Fantôme	
"Nikes" (Frank Ocean featuring Kohh)	2016	Blonde	Featured version appears only in a special CD edition.
"24365" (5lack featuring Kohh)	2018	Non-album single	
"We Talkin Bout" (Higher Brothers featuring Kohh)	2019	Five Stars	
"Runway (Remix)" (Mariah Carey featuring Kohh)	2022	Caution	Remix version appears only in Japanese digital edition.
"Mamushi" (Megan Thee Stallion featuring Yuki Chiba)	2024	Megan	No. 36 – Billboard Hot 100
"JJK" (MGK with Yuki Chiba)	2026	TBA	

== Accolades ==
MTV Europe Music Award

Year	Nominee / work	Award	Result
2017	Kohh	Best Japan Act	Won

Space Shower Music Video Awards

Year	Nominee / work	Award	Result
2016	Kohh	Best Hip Hop Artist	Won
2017	Kohh	Best Hip Hop Artist	Won
