= Cobra (Megan Thee Stallion song) =

Single by Megan Thee Stallion

from the album Megan
- Released: November 3, 2023
- Recorded: 2023
- Genre: Rap rock; emo rap
- Length: 2:48
- Label: Hot Girl
- Composers: Derrick Gray; Joel Banks; S. Clarke; Shawn "Source" Jarrett; Tay Banks
- Lyricist: Megan Pete
- Producers: Bankroll Got It; Derrick Milano; Shawn "Source" Jarrett

Megan Thee Stallion singles chronology
"Bongos" (2023)	"Cobra" (2023)	"Not My Fault" (2023)

Music video
- "Cobra" on YouTube

"Cobra" is a song by American rapper and songwriter Megan Thee Stallion from her third studio album, Megan (2024). It was released independently through Hot Girl Productions on November 3, 2023, as the album's lead single. It marked her first single since departing from her record label 1501 Certified Entertainment and 300 Entertainment in October 2023, as well as her first release as an independent artist.

The song received positive reviews by critics, being nominated at the 55th NAACP Image Awards for Outstanding Music Video and Outstanding Hip Hop/Rap Song, winning the latest. Commercially, it became the rapper's eighth top-ten song on the US Billboard Hot R&B/Hip-Hop Songs chart. A rock remix featuring Canadian heavy metal band Spiritbox was released on November 8.

== Background and composition ==
On October 19, 2023, 1501 Certified Entertainment sent out a press release announcing that the label and Megan Thee Stallion had "mutually reached a confidential settlement to resolve their legal differences", ending a three-plus-year legal battle and settling in Megan's favor. On October 28, 2023, Thee Stallion began teasing the release of her first solo single since she released her second studio album Traumazine in August 2022.

In a message ahead of the song's release, Megan Thee Stallion wrote, "Cobras exemplify courage and self-reliance. They stand tall and fierce in the face of challenges, teaching one to tap into their inner strength and rely on oneself to conquer their threats. Emulating the cobra helps one be more confident in the person they are within." The music video, directed by Douglas Bernardt and released alongside the single on November 3, 2023, begins with the rapper crawling out of a snake's mouth, peeling off a layer of her skin. She raps about confronting suicidal ideation while lying in a glass box surrounded by reporters and cameras, then performs a dance routine to a guitar solo within a spiral jetty.

As Billboard reported, the song (as well as her upcoming album) is entirely self-funded through Megan's independent enterprise Hot Girl Productions LLC. The song marks a distinct departure from her usual hip-hop style, exploring rap rock with a distinctive fuzzy electric guitar riff throughout the song. The song's lyrics explore the rapper's battles with depression and anxiety following the loss of both of her parents and her recent breakup with American rapper Pardi. In the song, she hints at Pardi's infidelity, recalling the moment she caught him cheating in her bed: "Pulled up, caught him cheatin'/ Gettin' his dick sucked in the same spot I'm sleepin'". A remix was released on November 8 with the Canadian-American alternative metal band Spiritbox, featuring a much harsher nu metal sound and gothic vocals from Courtney LaPlante.

== Critical reception ==
Upon its release, "Cobra" received widespread critical acclaim from music critics, many of whom praised her vulnerability on the track. Amber Corrine of Vibe praised the rapper for "own[ing] her truth" in the single: "Meg tells a story about her past from over the years — which includes: losing her parents and grandmother, experiencing a breakup with ex-boyfriend Pardison Fontaine, concluding a three-year case over being shot in the foot, and also settling a lawsuit with her former 1501 label." Malcom Trapp of Rap-Up remarked that Megan Thee Stallion "channeled vulnerability and defiance by revealing the struggles beneath her success" in "Cobra".

The song's bass-heavy influences were also met with acclaim. Larisha Paul of Rolling Stone wrote that Megan was "dripping with venom", while Jade Gomez of Complex remarked that the rapper "came out swinging". Rachel Aroesti of The Guardian defined the song as the "sonic creativity peaks" of the album, praising "its super-crunchy riff and fluttering synths".

== Chart performance ==
"Cobra" generated 12 million streams, 6,000 downloads and registered 660,000 radio airplay audience impressions in United States in its first week. The song peaked at number 32 of the Billboard Hot 100 and became Megan Thee Stallion's eighth top-10 hit on Hot R&B/Hip-Hop Songs, peaking at 10. It also became the rapper's 10th top-10 hit on R&B/Hip-Hop Streaming Songs, debuting at number seven, and topped the R&B/Hip-Hop Digital Song Sales chart.

== Track listings ==
- Streaming/digital download
1. "Cobra" – 2:48
- Streaming/digital download – rock remix
1. "Cobra" (rock remix; feat. Spiritbox) – 3:05
2. "Cobra" – 2:48

== Charts ==
Chart performance for "Cobra"
Chart (2023–2024)	Peak position
Global 200 (Billboard)	82
New Zealand Hot Singles (RMNZ)	6
UK Singles (Official Charts)	83
UK Indie (Official Charts)	38
US Billboard Hot 100	32
US Hot R&B/Hip-Hop Songs (Billboard)	10
US Hot Rock & Alternative Songs (Billboard) with Spiritbox	47

== Certifications ==
Certifications for "Cobra"
Region	Certification	Certified units/sales
United States (RIAA)	Gold	500,000^{‡}
^{‡} Sales+streaming figures based on certification alone.

== Release history ==
Release dates and formats for "Cobra"
Region	Date	Format	Version	Label	Ref.
Various	November 3, 2023	Digital download; streaming	Original	Hot Girl	
Various	November 8, 2023	Digital download; streaming	Rock remix	Hot Girl	
