= Derrick Milano =

American songwriter (born 1993)

- Milano in 2024

Background information
- Born: Derrick Carrington Gray; December 24, 1993 (age 32); Philadelphia, Pennsylvania, U.S.
- Origin: Orlando, Florida, U.S.
- Genres: Hip hop; pop
- Occupations: Songwriter; rapper; singer
- Years active: 2013–present
- Label: Epic
- Partner: Blac Chyna (2024-2025)

Derrick Carrington Gray (born December 24, 1993), known professionally as Derrick Milano, is an American songwriter, rapper, and singer. Raised in Philadelphia and Delaware, he moved to Florida to pursue entertainment studies at Full Sail University. He began his musical career as a recording artist in 2013 before shifting focus to songwriting work in 2019.

Milano has written songs for artists including Justin Bieber, Pop Smoke, Nicki Minaj, and Megan Thee Stallion. In 2021, he won Best Rap Song at the 63rd Annual Grammy Awards for co-writing the single "Savage Remix" by Megan Thee Stallion featuring Beyoncé.

== Early life and education ==
Derrick Gray was born in Philadelphia, Pennsylvania, to Virginia and Jeff Gray. Gray first gained experience in music as a member of his church's choir. His family moved to Brandywine Hundred, Delaware, when he was in seventh grade, and he attended Hanby Middle School, Brandywine High School, and Red Lion Christian Academy, before graduating from Concord High School in 2012. While in high school, Gray would battle rap with friends and was a member of the school choir.

After graduating from high school, Gray attended college in Florida, including at Valencia College and Full Sail University, where he was involved in Business Professionals of America.

== Career ==
=== Early career (2013–2018) ===
Milano began his music career while in college, where he distributed mixtapes for his music. His breakout success came with the release of the "trap-happy" single "#ThatAintYaBitch", which he released on SoundCloud in May 2014. As a result of the single's success, he was invited to open for artists playing shows at Orlando-area venues, including for rappers Young Thug and Future. Following this early success, a dispute with his management made releasing and promoting music challenging for Milano.

=== Writing and Grammy (2019–2023) ===
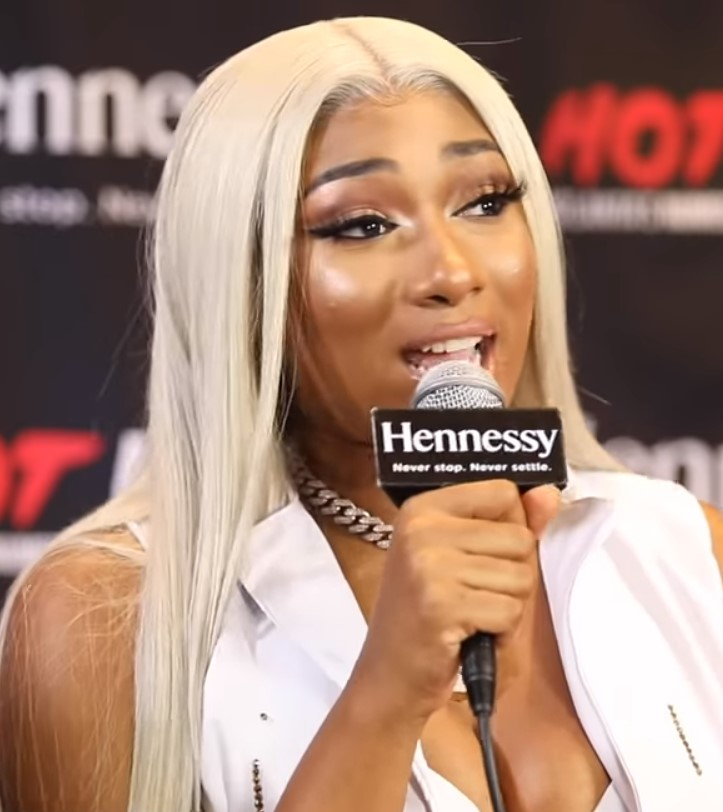
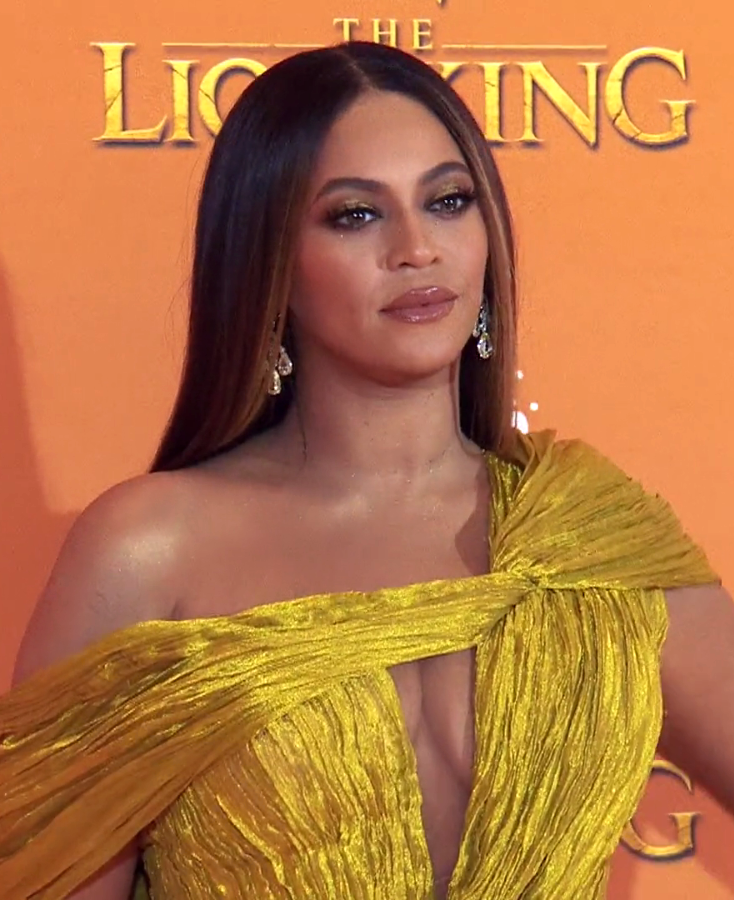
Milano won a Grammy in 2021 for his work in co-writing "Savage Remix", which is performed by Megan Thee Stallion (first image) and features Beyoncé (second image).

Milano's first writing experience came on Kevin Gates' 2019 album I'm Him. In May 2019, Juicy J, who Milano first connected with when he was in high school, invited Milano to help with Megan Thee Stallion's song "Simon Says". This led to an uncredited writing opportunity on "Hot Girl Summer", another song by Megan Thee Stallion, which was released in July 2019.

Milano continued to work with Megan Thee Stallion, co-writing "Savage Remix", which features Beyoncé and was released in April 2020. In March 2021, Milano won the Grammy Award for Best Rap Song at the 63rd Annual Grammy Awards for his work as a co-writer on "Savage Remix".

As of March 2021, Milano was working on his debut album, which will include tracks featuring Juicy J, Ty Dolla Sign, and Wiz Khalifa and is scheduled to be released later in 2021.

In 2023, Milano was featured on a remix to Ciara's song "Da Girls". It was released on May 12, 2023.

== Awards and nominations ==
Year	Awards	Category	Nominated work	Result	Ref.
2021	Grammy Awards	Best Rap Song	"Savage Remix"	Won	
