= Megan Thee Stallion discography =

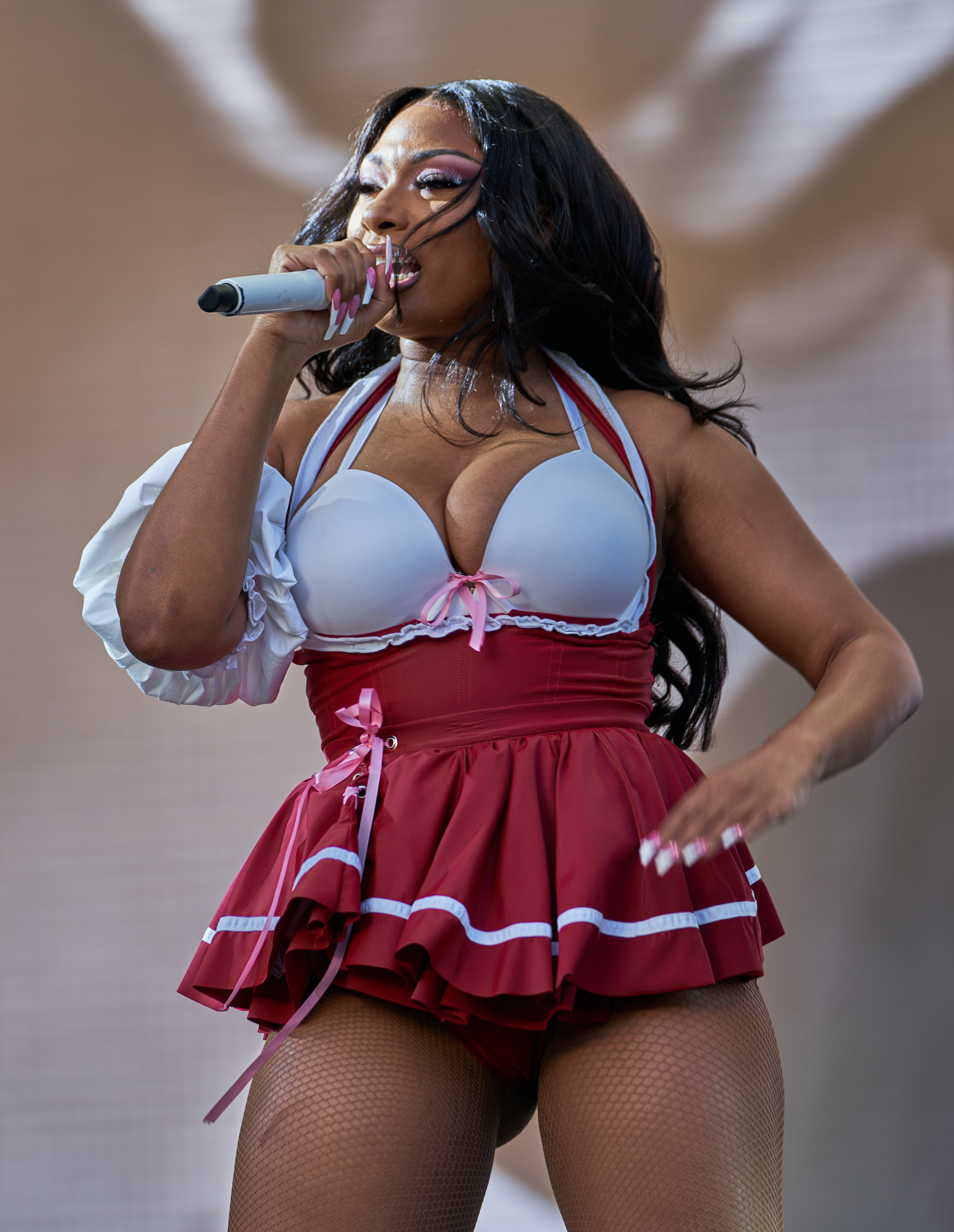
- Megan Thee Stallion performing in 2022
- Studio albums: 3
- EPs: 3
- Singles: 60
- Reissues: 1
- Mixtapes: 3
- Compilation albums: 1
- Promotional singles: 6

The discography of Megan Thee Stallion, an American rapper and songwriter, consists of three studio albums, one reissue, one compilation album, three mixtapes, three extended plays, 60 singles (including 21 as a featured artist), and six promotional singles. After releasing the non-commercial and SoundCloud-exclusive mixtapes with Rich Ratchet (2016) and Megan Mix (2017) in her early career, Megan made her official solo debut act by commercially releasing two extended plays with Make It Hot (2017) and Tina Snow (2018), with the latter of which gained her national mainstream popularity—as it features the single, "Big Ole Freak", which became her first-ever entry on the US Billboard Hot 100 and her first single to be certified platinum by the Recording Industry Association of America (RIAA)—by 2019. Her mixtape, Fever (2019), became her first top-ten album on the US Billboard 200. The second single from the mixtape, "Cash Shit" (featuring fellow American rapper DaBaby), peaked at number 36 on the Hot 100 and was certified 4× platinum by the RIAA. In August 2019, Megan released the single, "Hot Girl Summer" (featuring Nicki Minaj and singer-songwriter Ty Dolla Sign), which peaked at number 11 on the Hot 100 and became a certified platinum by the RIAA.

Her third extended play (EP), Suga (2020), peaked at number 7 on the Billboard 200. The remix of the single, "Savage" (featuring Beyoncé), became Stallion's first number-one song in her career after topping on the Billboard Hot 100 in May 2020. She shortly earned her second number-one on the Hot 100 after featuring on the song "WAP" by American rapper Cardi B. The song additionally became Stallion's first number-one on the Billboard Global 200 and in countries such as Australia, Canada, Ireland, United Kingdom, and New Zealand. Her debut studio album, Good News (2020), debuted at number two on the Billboard 200. It spawned the single, "Body", which peaked at number 12 on the Hot 100 and made her the first female act to achieve three number-one songs on the Streaming Songs chart within a year. Her compilation album, Something for Thee Hotties (2021), debuted at number five on the Billboard 200. It features a single, "Thot Shit", which peaked at number 16 on the Billboard Hot 100 and was certified 2× platinum by the RIAA. Her second studio album, Traumazine (2022), features a single, "Sweetest Pie" (with Dua Lipa), which peaked at number 15 on the Hot 100 and has been certified platinum by the RIAA.

As an independent artist, Megan achieved her first solo number-one song on the Hot 100 and became the first lead female rapper to debut atop the Billboard Global 200 with the single, "Hiss", from her third studio album Megan (2024). Her most recent release is Tina Tuesday Freestyle".

== Albums ==
=== Studio albums ===
List of studio albums
Title	Details	Peak chart positions										Certifications
Title	Details	US	US R&B /HH	AUS	BEL (FL)	CAN	FRA	IRE	NLD	NZ	UK	Certifications
Good News	Released: November 20, 2020; Label: 1501 Certified, 300; Formats: Vinyl, CD, cassette, digital download, streaming	2	1	41	91	9	107	22	77	22	46	RIAA: Platinum; BPI: Silver; RMNZ: Gold
Traumazine	Released: August 12, 2022; Label: 1501 Certified, 300; Formats: CD, LP, cassette, digital download, streaming	4	3	68	190	19	149	—	—	27	65	RIAA: Gold; RMNZ: Gold
Megan	Released: June 28, 2024; Label: Hot Girl, Warner; Formats: CD, LP, digital download, streaming	3	1	94	—	53	—	—	—	33	97	
"—" denotes a recording that did not chart or was not released in that territory.

=== Reissued albums ===
List of reissues
Title	Details	Certifications
Megan: Act II	Released: October 25, 2024; Label: Hot Girl, Warner; Formats: CD, digital download, streaming	RIAA: Gold

=== Compilation albums ===
List of compilation albums
Title	Details	Peak chart positions			Certifications
Title	Details	US	US R&B /HH	CAN	Certifications
Something for Thee Hotties	Released: October 29, 2021; Label: 1501 Certified, 300; Formats: Digital download, streaming	5	3	69	RIAA: Gold

== Extended plays ==
List of extended plays
Title	Details	Peak chart positions					Certifications
Title	Details	US	US R&B /HH	CAN	FRA	NLD	Certifications
Make It Hot	Released: September 18, 2017 (US); Label: 1501 Certified; Formats: LP, Digital download, streaming	—	—	—	—	—	
Tina Snow	Released: December 21, 2018 (US); Label: 1501 Certified, 300; Formats: Digital download, streaming	166	—	—	—	—	RIAA: Gold
Suga	Released: March 6, 2020 (US); Label: 1501 Certified, 300; Formats: LP, Digital download, streaming	7	7	17	149	55	RIAA: Gold; RMNZ: Gold
"—" denotes an album that did not chart or was not released in that territory.

== Mixtapes ==
List of mixtapes, with selected details, chart positions and certifications
Title	Details	Peak chart positions		Certifications
Title	Details	US	US R&B /HH	Certifications
Rich Ratchet	Released: 2016 (US); Label: Self-released; Format: N/A	—	—	
Megan Mix	Released: 2017 (US); Label: Self-released; Format: N/A	—	—	
Fever	Released: May 17, 2019 (US); Label: 300; Formats: Digital download, streaming	10	6	RIAA: Gold
"—" denotes a recording that did not chart or was not released in that territory.

== Singles ==
=== As lead artist ===
List of charted singles, with selected peak chart positions, certifications, year and album
Title	Year	Peak chart positions										Certifications	Album
Title	Year	US	US R&B /HH	AUS	CAN	FRA	IRE	NZ	SWI	UK	WW	Certifications	Album
"Pull Up Late"	2017	—	—	—	—	—	—	—	—	—	—		Make It Hot
"Last Week in HTx"	2017	—	—	—	—	—	—	—	—	—	—		Make It Hot
"Cocky AF"	2018	—	—	—	—	—	—	—	—	—	—		Tina Snow
"Big Ole Freak"	2019	65	25	—	—	—	—	—	—	—	—	RIAA: 2× Platinum	Tina Snow
"Sex Talk"	2019	—	—	—	—	—	—	—	—	—	—	RIAA: Platinum	Fever
"Realer"	2019	—	—	—	—	—	—	—	—	—	—	RIAA: Gold	Fever
"Cash Shit" (featuring DaBaby)	2019	36	16	—	—	—	—	—	—	—	—	RIAA: 4× Platinum; RMNZ: Gold	Fever
"Hot Girl Summer" (featuring Nicki Minaj and Ty Dolla Sign)	2019	11	7	64	38	37	51	— (Note: "Hot Girl Summer" did not enter the NZ Top 40 Singles Chart, but peaked at number two on the NZ Hot Singles Chart.)	—	40	—	RIAA: 2× Platinum; BPI: Silver; MC: 2× Platinum; RMNZ: Platinum	Non-album single
"All Dat" (with Moneybagg Yo)	2019	70	34	—	—	—	—	—	—	—	—	RIAA: 2× Platinum	Time Served
"Ride or Die" (with VickeeLo)	2019	— (Note: "Ride or Die" did not enter the Billboard Hot 100, but peaked at number 23 on the Bubbling Under Hot 100 chart.)	— (Note: "Ride or Die" did not enter the Hot R&B/Hip-Hop Songs chart, but peaked at number four on the Bubbling Under R&B/Hip-Hop Singles chart.)	—	—	—	—	—	—	—	—		Queen & Slim: The Soundtrack
"Diamonds" (with Normani)	2020	— (Note: "Diamonds" did not enter the Billboard Hot 100, but peaked at number 16 on the Bubbling Under Hot 100 chart.)	— (Note: "Diamonds" did not enter the Billboard Hot R&B/Hip-Hop Songs chart, but peaked at number 12 on the R&B/Hip-Hop Digital Song Sales chart.)	—	—	—	—	— (Note: "Diamonds" did not enter the NZ Top 40 Singles Chart, but peaked at number 23 on the NZ Hot Singles Chart.)	—	—	—		Birds of Prey: The Album
"B.I.T.C.H."	2020	31	15	—	—	—	—	— (Note: "B.I.T.C.H." did not enter the NZ Top 40 Singles Chart, but peaked at number 12 on the NZ Hot Singles Chart.)	—	—	—	RIAA: Platinum	Suga
"Captain Hook"	2020	74	41	—	—	—	—	— (Note: "Captain Hook" did not enter the NZ Top 40 Singles Chart, but peaked at number 26 on the NZ Hot Singles Chart.)	—	—	—	RIAA: 2× Platinum; RMNZ: Gold	Suga
"Freak" (with Tyga)	2020	— (Note: "Freak" did not enter the Billboard Hot 100, but peaked at number 20 on the Bubbling Under Hot 100 chart.)	— (Note: "Freak" did not enter the Billboard Hot R&B/Hip-Hop Songs chart, but peaked at number 10 on the R&B/Hip-Hop Digital Song Sales chart.)	—	—	—	—	—	—	—	—		Non-album single
"Savage" (solo or remix featuring Beyoncé)	2020	1	1	4	9	26	3	2	18	3	52	RIAA: 6× Platinum; BPI: Platinum; MC: 5× Platinum; RMNZ: 3× Platinum; SNEP: Gold	Suga and Good News
"Girls in the Hood"	2020	28	13	—	90	—	—	— (Note: "Girls in the Hood" did not enter the NZ Top 40 Singles Chart, but peaked at number 10 on the NZ Hot Singles Chart.)	—	—	129	RIAA: 3× Platinum; BPI: Silver; RMNZ: Gold	Good News
"Don't Stop" (featuring Young Thug)	2020	30	14	—	97	—	—	— (Note: "Don't Stop" did not enter the NZ Top 40 Singles Chart, but peaked at number 28 on the NZ Hot Singles Chart.)	—	—	61	RIAA: Platinum	Good News
"Body"	2020	12	4	57	43	—	37	— (Note: "Body" did not enter the NZ Top 40 Singles Chart, but peaked at number 5 on the NZ Hot Singles Chart.)	—	44	27	RIAA: 3× Platinum; BPI: Silver; MC: 2× Platinum; RMNZ: Platinum	Good News
"Cry Baby" (featuring DaBaby)	2021	28	13	—	86	—	91	—	—	—	78	RIAA: 2× Platinum; RMNZ: Gold	Good News
"I'm a King" (with Bobby Sessions)	2021	—	—	—	—	—	—	—	—	—	—		Coming 2 America
"Pop It" (with Bankroll Freddie)	2021	—	— (Note: "Pop It" did not enter the Billboard Hot R&B/Hip-Hop Songs chart, but peaked at number 13 on the R&B/Hip-Hop Airplay chart.)	—	—	—	—	—	—	—	—		Big Bank
"Bad Bitches" (with Marshmello and Nitti Gritti)	2021	—	—	—	—	—	—	—	—	—	—		Shockwave
"Thot Shit"	2021	16	6	38	43	—	44	— (Note: "Thot Shit" did not enter the NZ Top 40 Singles Chart, but peaked at number 11 on the NZ Hot Singles Chart.)	—	65	27	RIAA: 2× Platinum; BPI: Silver; RMNZ: Platinum	Something for Thee Hotties
"SG" (with DJ Snake, Ozuna, and Lisa)	2021	— (Note: "SG" did not enter the Billboard Hot 100, but peaked at number two on the Bubbling Under Hot 100 chart.)	—	—	86	87	—	— (Note: "SG" did not enter the NZ Top 40 Singles Chart, but peaked at number 5 on the NZ Hot Singles Chart.)	56	—	19	SNEP: Gold	Non-album single
"Megan's Piano"	2021	97	34	—	—	—	—	—	—	—	—	RIAA: Platinum	Something for Thee Hotties
"Lick" (with Shenseea)	2022	— (Note: "Lick" did not enter the Billboard Hot 100, but peaked at number 20 on the Bubbling Under Hot 100 chart.)	— (Note: "Lick" did not enter the Billboard Hot R&B/Hip-Hop Songs chart, but peaked at number 23 on the R&B/Hip-Hop Digital Song Sales chart.)	—	—	—	—	— (Note: "Lick" did not enter the NZ Top 40 Singles Chart, but peaked at number 26 on the NZ Hot Singles Chart.)	—	—	—		Alpha
"Sweetest Pie" (with Dua Lipa)	2022	15	— (Note: "Sweetest Pie" did not enter the Hot R&B/Hip-Hop Songs chart, but peaked at number three on the Hot Rap Songs chart.)	25	19	153	14	33	54	31	12	RIAA: Platinum; BPI: Silver; MC: Platinum; RMNZ: Platinum	Traumazine
"Plan B"	2022	29	7	—	66	—	—	— (Note: "Plan B" did not enter the NZ Top 40 Singles Chart, but peaked at number three on the NZ Hot Singles Chart.)	—	—	51	RIAA: Platinum; RMNZ: Gold	Traumazine
"Pressurelicious" (featuring Future)	2022	55	14	—	—	—	—	— (Note: "Pressurelicious" did not enter the NZ Top 40 Singles Chart, but peaked at number 18 on the NZ Hot Singles Chart.)	—	—	187		Traumazine
"Her"	2022	62	19	—	—	—	—	— (Note: "Her" did not enter the NZ Top 40 Singles Chart, but peaked at number six on the NZ Hot Singles Chart.)	—	—	164	RIAA: Gold	Traumazine
"Ungrateful" (featuring Key Glock)	2022	82	29	—	—	—	—	— (Note: "Ungrateful" did not enter the NZ Top 40 Singles Chart, but peaked at number 28 on the NZ Hot Singles Chart.)	—	—	—		Traumazine
"Cobra"	2023	32	10	—	—	—	—	— (Note: "Cobra" did not enter the NZ Top 40 Singles Chart, but peaked at number six on the NZ Hot Singles Chart.)	—	83	82	RIAA: Gold	Megan
"Not My Fault" (with Reneé Rapp)	2023	— (Note: "Not My Fault" did not enter the Billboard Hot 100, but peaked at number two on the Bubbling Under Hot 100 chart.)	—	—	82	—	54	— (Note: "Not My Fault" did not enter the NZ Top 40 Singles Chart, but peaked at number eight on the NZ Hot Singles Chart.)	—	61	—	ARIA: Gold; MC: Gold	Mean Girls
"Hiss"	2024	1	1	62	18	—	36	— (Note: "Hiss" did not enter the NZ Top 40 Singles Chart, but peaked at number two on the NZ Hot Singles Chart.)	—	31	1	RIAA: Platinum; MC: Gold	Megan
"Wanna Be" (with GloRilla or remix also with Cardi B)	2024	11	5	—	80	—	—	— (Note: "Wanna Be" (Remix) did not enter the NZ Top 40 Singles Chart, but peaked at number 25 on the NZ Hot Singles Chart.)	—	—	38	RIAA: 2× Platinum; RMNZ: Gold	Ehhthang Ehhthang
"Boa"	2024	39	13	—	—	—	—	— (Note: "Boa" did not enter the NZ Top 40 Singles Chart, but peaked at number 14 on the NZ Hot Singles Chart.)	—	— (Note: "Boa" did not enter the UK Official Singles Chart, but it peaked at number 93 on the Official Singles Downloads Chart.)	172	RIAA: Gold	Megan
"Mamushi" (featuring Yuki Chiba)	2024	36	7	87	56	—	—	— (Note: "Mamushi" did not enter the NZ Top 40 Singles Chart, but peaked at number six on the NZ Hot Singles Chart.)	—	89	29	RIAA: Platinum; ARIA: Gold; MC: Gold; RMNZ: Gold	Megan
"Neva Play" (featuring RM)	2024	36	7	—	63	—	97	— (Note: "Neva Play" did not enter the NZ Top 40 Singles Chart, but peaked at number two on the NZ Hot Singles Chart.)	—	66	17		Megan: Act II
"Bigger in Texas"	2024	84	31	—	—	—	—	— (Note: "Bigger in Texas" did not enter the NZ Top 40 Singles Chart, but peaked at number 24 on the NZ Hot Singles Chart.)	—	—	—	RIAA: Gold	Megan: Act II
"Whenever"	2025	— (Note: "Whenever" did not enter the Billboard Hot 100, but peaked at number 2 on the Bubbling Under Hot 100 chart.)	24	—	—	—	—	— (Note: "Whenever" did not enter the NZ Top 40 Singles Chart, but peaked at number 22 on the NZ Hot Singles Chart.)	—	—	—		Non-album singles
"Lover Girl"	2025	38	7	—	—	—	—	— (Note: "Lover Girl" did not enter the NZ Top 40 Singles Chart, but peaked at number 19 on the NZ Hot Singles Chart.)	—	—	—		Non-album singles
"DNA (More Than a Game)" (with Andrea Bocelli, David Guetta, and Ejae)	2026	— (Note: "DNA (More Than a Game)" did not enter the Billboard Hot 100, but peaked at number 17 on the Digital Song Sales chart.)	—	—	—	—	—	— (Note: "DNA (More Than a Game)" did not enter the NZ Top 40 Singles Chart, but peaked at number 19 on the NZ Hot Singles Chart.)	53	— (Note: "DNA (More Than a Game)" did not enter the UK Official Singles Chart, but it peaked at number 54 on the Official Singles Downloads Chart.)	—		FIFA World Cup 2026 Album
"—" denotes a recording that did not chart or was not released in that territory.

=== As featured artist ===
List of singles
Title	Year	Peak chart positions										Certifications	Album
Title	Year	US	US R&B /HH	AUS	CAN	FRA	IRE	LTU	NZ	UK	WW	Certifications	Album
"No Pressure" (Drebae featuring Megan Thee Stallion)	2018	—	—	—	—	—	—	—	—	—	—		Non-album single
"Poledancer" (Wale featuring Megan Thee Stallion)	2018	—	— (Note: "Poledancer" did not enter the Billboard Hot R&B/Hip-Hop Songs chart, but peaked at number 29 on the R&B/Hip-Hop Airplay chart.)	—	—	—	—	—	—	—	—	RIAA: Gold	Wow... That's Crazy
"Bestie" (Bhad Bhabie featuring Megan Thee Stallion)	2019	—	—	—	—	—	—	—	—	—	—		Non-album single
"She Live" (Maxo Kream featuring Megan Thee Stallion)	2019	—	—	—	—	—	—	—	—	—	—		Brandon Banks
"Three Point Stance" (Juicy J featuring City Girls and Megan Thee Stallion)	2019	—	—	—	—	—	—	—	—	—	—		Non-album single
"Pastor" (Quavo and City Girls featuring Megan Thee Stallion)	2019	—	—	—	—	—	—	—	—	—	—		Control the Streets, Vol. 2
"Pose (Remix)" (Yo Gotti featuring Megan Thee Stallion and Lil Uzi Vert)	2019	— (Note: "Pose" did not enter the Billboard Hot 100 but did peak at number eight on the Bubbling Under Hot 100 chart.)	— (Note: "Pose" did not enter the Billboard Hot R&B/Hip-Hop Songs chart, but peaked at number 40 on the R&B/Hip-Hop Airplay chart.)	—	—	—	—	—	—	—	—		Untrapped
"Big Booty" (Gucci Mane featuring Megan Thee Stallion)	2019	— (Note: "Big Booty" did not enter the Billboard Hot 100 but did peak at number four on the Bubbling Under Hot 100 chart.)	— (Note: "Big Booty" did not enter the Billboard Hot R&B/Hip-Hop Songs chart, but peaked at number one on the Bubbling Under R&B/Hip-Hop Songs chart.)	—	—	—	—	—	—	—	—	RIAA: Platinum	Woptober II
"Fkn Around" (Phony Ppl featuring Megan Thee Stallion)	2020	—	— (Note: "Fkn Around" did not enter the Billboard Hot R&B/Hip-Hop Songs chart, but peaked at number 33 on the R&B/Hip-Hop Airplay chart.)	—	—	—	—	—	—	—	—		Non-album single
"RNB" (Young Dolph featuring Megan Thee Stallion)	2020	— (Note: "RNB" did not enter the Billboard Hot 100 but did peak at number one on the Bubbling Under Hot 100 chart.)	46	—	—	—	—	—	—	—	—	RIAA: Gold	Rich Slave
"WAP" (Cardi B featuring Megan Thee Stallion)	2020	1	1	1	1	1	1	1	1	1	1	RIAA: Diamond; ARIA: 10× Platinum; BPI: 2× Platinum; MC: 9× Platinum; RMNZ: 5× Platinum; SNEP: Diamond	Am I the Drama?
"Thick (Remix)" (DJ Chose featuring Megan Thee Stallion)	2020	—	—	—	—	—	—	—	—	—	—		Non-album single
"34+35 (Remix)" (Ariana Grande featuring Doja Cat and Megan Thee Stallion)	2021	2	—	—	—	—	—	30	— (Note: "34+35" did not enter the NZ Top 40 Singles Chart, but peaked at number two on the NZ Hot Singles Chart.)	—	2		Positions (Deluxe)
"Beautiful Mistakes" (Maroon 5 featuring Megan Thee Stallion)	2021	13	—	36	7	38	36	45	21	50	24	RIAA: Platinum; ARIA: 3× Platinum; BPI: Gold; MC: Platinum; RMNZ: 2× Platinum; SNEP: Diamond	Jordi
"On Me (Remix)" (Lil Baby featuring Megan Thee Stallion)	2021	— (Note: "On Me" did not enter the Billboard Hot 100, but peaked at number seven on the Digital Song Sales chart.)	— (Note: "On Me" did not enter the Billboard Hot R&B/Hip-Hop Songs chart, but peaked at number four on the R&B/Hip-Hop Digital Song Sales chart.)	—	—	—	—	—	—	—	—		Non-album single
"I Did It" (DJ Khaled featuring Post Malone, Megan Thee Stallion, Lil Baby, and DaBaby)	2021	43	17	99	22	—	48	78	— (Note: "I Did It" did not enter the NZ Top 40 Singles Chart, but peaked at number seven on the NZ Hot Singles Chart.)	53	33	RIAA: Gold	Khaled Khaled
"Butter (Remix)" (BTS featuring Megan Thee Stallion)	2021	— (Note: "Butter" did not enter the Billboard Hot 100, but peaked at number 35 on the Streaming Songs chart.)	—	—	—	—	—	—	27	—	3		Non-album single
"It Was a... (Masked Christmas)" (Jimmy Fallon featuring Ariana Grande and Megan Thee Stallion)	2021	—	—	—	—	—	—	—	—	—	—		Holiday Seasoning
"Bongos" (Cardi B featuring Megan Thee Stallion)	2023	14	4	78	43	—	64	12	— (Note: "Bongos" did not enter the NZ Top 40 Singles Chart, but peaked at number six on the NZ Hot Singles Chart.)	35	26	MC: Platinum	Am I the Drama? (Ultimate Edition)
"Sunday Service (Remix)" (Latto featuring Megan Thee Stallion and Flo Milli)	2024	100	26	—	—	—	—	—	—	—	—		Sugar Honey Iced Tea
"BBA" (Paris Hilton featuring Megan Thee Stallion)	2024	—	—	—	—	—	—	—	—	—	—		Infinite Icon
"Strategy" (Twice featuring Megan Thee Stallion)	2024	— (Note: "Strategy" did not enter the Billboard Hot 100 but did peak at number one on the Bubbling Under Hot 100 chart.)	—	85	81	—	—	—	— (Note: "Strategy" did not enter the NZ Top 40 Singles Chart, but peaked at number eight on the NZ Hot Singles Chart.)	—	48		Strategy
"B.B.B." (Juvenile featuring Megan Thee Stallion)	2026	67	16	—	—	—	—	—	—	—	—		Boiling Point
"Motion Party (Remix)" (BossMan Dlow featuring Megan Thee Stallion)	2026	—	—	—	—	—	—	—	—	—	—		Non-album singles
"Pink Blush (Remix)" (Dolly Babe featuring Megan Thee Stallion)	2026	58	13	—	—	—	—	—	—	—	—		Non-album singles
"—" denotes a recording that did not chart or was not released in that territory.

=== Promotional singles ===
List of promotional singles
Title	Year	Peak chart position			Album
Title	Year	US	US R&B /HH	NZ Hot	Album
"Stalli (Freestyle)"	2017	—	—	—	Non-album singles
"Fire in the Booth, Pt.1"	2019	—	—	—	Non-album singles
"Crazy Family" (with Maluma and Rock Mafia)	2021	—	—	—	The Addams Family 2
"Flamin' Hottie"	2022	—	—	—	Non-album singles
"Pussy Don't Lie" (with the Big Mouth cast)	2023	—	—	22	Non-album singles
"We Will Rock You" (with Queen)	2024	—	—	—	Non-album singles
"Tina Tuesday Freestyle"	2026	— (Note: "Tina Tuesday Freestyle" did not enter the Billboard Hot 100, but peaked at number 8 on the Bubbling Under Hot 100 chart.)	24	—	Tina Tuesday Freestyles
"Is You Cool?"	2026	—	33	—	Tina Tuesday Freestyles
"Thin Ice"	2026	64	11	13	Tina Tuesday Freestyles
"—" denotes a recording that did not chart or was not released in that territory.

== Other charted and certified songs ==
List of non-single charting songs, with selected peak chart positions, certifications, year and album
Title	Year	Peak chart positions								Certifications	Album
Title	Year	US	US R&B /HH	US Rap	CAN	LBN	NZ Hot	UK Indie	WW	Certifications	Album
"Freak Nasty"	2018	—	—	—	—	—	—	—	—	RIAA: Gold	Tina Snow
"Cognac Queen"	2018	—	—	—	—	—	—	—	—	RIAA: Gold; RMNZ: Gold	Tina Snow
"Handsome" (Chance the Rapper featuring Megan Thee Stallion)	2019	— (Note: "Handsome" did not enter the Billboard Hot 100, but peaked at number five on the Bubbling Under Hot 100 chart.)	45	—	—	—	—	—	—		The Big Day
"Nasty" (DaBaby featuring Ashanti and Megan Thee Stallion)	2020	50	20	17	—	—	—	—	—	RIAA: Platinum	Blame It on Baby
"Shots Fired"	2020	82	25	23	—	—	25	—	162		Good News
"Circles"	2020	94	34	—	—	—	22	50	159		Good News
"Do It on the Tip" (featuring City Girls)	2020	92	33	—	—	—	—	—	191		Good News
"Sugar Baby"	2020	— (Note: "Sugar Baby" did not enter the Billboard Hot 100, but peaked at number nine on the Bubbling Under Hot 100 chart.)	50	—	—	—	—	—	—		Good News
"Movie" (featuring Lil Durk)	2020	— (Note: "Movie" did not enter the Billboard Hot 100, but peaked at number two on the Bubbling Under Hot 100 chart.)	39	—	—	—	—	—	—		Good News
"Freaky Girls" (featuring SZA)	2020	— (Note: "Freaky Girls" did not enter the Billboard Hot 100, but peaked at number one on the Bubbling Under Hot 100 chart.)	36	—	—	—	21	—	199		Good News
"What's New"	2020	— (Note: "What's New" did not enter the Billboard Hot 100, but peaked at number eight on the Bubbling Under Hot 100 chart.)	48	—	—	—	—	—	—	RIAA: Gold	Good News
"Go Crazy" (featuring Big Sean and 2 Chainz)	2020	— (Note: "Go Crazy" did not enter the Billboard Hot 100, but peaked at number 12 on the Bubbling Under Hot 100 chart.)	—	—	—	—	—	—	—		Good News
"Dolla Sign Slime" (Lil Nas X featuring Megan Thee Stallion)	2021	47	17	15	43	—	—	—	43		Montero
"Eat It"	2021	82	31	24	—	—	33	—	—		Something for Thee Hotties
"NDA"	2022	— (Note: "NDA" did not enter the Billboard Hot 100, but peaked at number eight on the Bubbling Under Hot 100 chart.)	46	—	—	—	—	—	—		Traumazine
"Not Nice"	2022	— (Note: "Not Nice" did not enter the Billboard Hot 100, but peaked at number 13 on the Bubbling Under Hot 100 chart.)	—	—	—	—	30	—	—		Traumazine
"Budget" (featuring Latto)	2022	87	31	— (Note: "Budget" did not enter the Billboard Hot Rap Songs chart, but peaked at number 14 on the Rap Digital Song Sales chart.)	—	—	20	—	—		Traumazine
"Gift & a Curse"	2022	— (Note: "Gift & a Curse" did not enter the Billboard Hot 100, but peaked at number 21 on the Bubbling Under Hot 100 chart.)	—	—	—	—	—	—	—		Traumazine
"Who Me" (featuring Pooh Shiesty)	2022	— (Note: "Who Me" did not enter the Billboard Hot 100, but peaked at number 19 on the Bubbling Under Hot 100 chart.)	—	—	—	—	—	—	—		Traumazine
"Anxiety"	2022	—	— (Note: "Anxiety" did not enter the Billboard Hot R&B/Hip-Hop Songs chart, but peaked at number 18 on the R&B/Hip-Hop Digital Song Sales chart.)	— (Note: "Anxiety" did not enter the Billboard Hot Rap Songs chart, but peaked at number 12 on the Rap Digital Song Sales chart.)	—	—	—	—	—	RIAA: Gold	Traumazine
"Rattle"	2024	—	47	—	—	—	—	—	—		Megan
"Where Them Girls At"	2024	77	24	22	—	14	33	—	—		Megan
"B.A.S." (featuring Kyle Richh)	2024	—	49	—	—	—	—	—	—		Megan
"Otaku Hot Girl"	2024	67	20	17	—	—	19	—	—		Megan
"Accent" (featuring GloRilla)	2024	—	42	—	—	—	—	—	—		Megan
"How I Look" (GloRilla featuring Megan Thee Stallion)	2024	90	33	—	—	—	—	—	—		Glorious
"Roc Steady" (featuring Flo Milli)	2024	—	—	—	—	—	38	—	—	RIAA: Gold	Megan: Act II
"TYG" (featuring Spiritbox)	2024	— (Note: "TYG" did not enter the Billboard Hot 100 chart, but peaked at number 37 on the Hot Rock & Alternative Songs chart.)	—	—	—	—	—	—	—		Megan: Act II
"Mamushi" (remix featuring Twice)	2024	—	—	—	—	—	34	—	—		Megan: Act II
"Rapunzel" (Lisa featuring Megan Thee Stallion)	2025	—	—	— (Note: "Rapunzel" did not enter the Billboard Hot Rap Songs chart, but peaked at number 9 on the Rap Digital Song Sales chart.)	—	—	27	—	— (Note: "Rapunzel" did not enter the Billboard Global 200 chart, but peaked at number 165 on the Global Excl. US chart.)		Alter Ego
"—" denotes a recording that did not chart or was not released in that territory.

== Guest appearances ==
List of non-single guest appearances, with other performing artists, showing year released and album name
Title	Year	Other performer(s)	Album
"Talk (Remix)"	2019	Khalid, Yo Gotti	Non-album single
"Handsome"	2019	Chance the Rapper	The Big Day
"Y U Mad"	2020	Wiz Khalifa, Ty Dolla Sign & Mustard	The Saga of Wiz Khalifa
"Real Hot Girl Skit"	2020	Kehlani	It Was Good Until It Wasn't
"She Gon Pop It"	2020	Juicy J, Ty Dolla Sign	The Hustle Continues
"Pop It"	2021	Bankroll Freddie	Big Bank
"Dolla Sign Slime"	2021	Lil Nas X	Montero
"Out Alpha the Alpha"	2023	None	Dicks: The Musical
"Hell No! (Timbaland Remix)"	2023	Danielle Brooks	The Color Purple (Music from and Inspired By)
"Squeeze"	2024	Latto	Sugar Honey Iced Tea
"How I Look"	2024	GloRilla	Glorious
"Rapunzel"	2025	Lisa	Alter Ego
"DNA (More Than A Game)"	2026	David Guetta, Andrea Bocelli & Ejae	Official FIFA World Cup 2026 Album
