= Anxiety (Megan Thee Stallion song) =

Song by Megan Thee Stallion

Song by Megan Thee Stallion

from the album Traumazine
- Released: August 12, 2022
- Length: 2:15
- Label: 1501 Certified; 300
- Songwriters: Megan Pete; Kevin Price
- Producer: Go Grizzly

"Anxiety" is a song by American rapper and songwriter Megan Thee Stallion from her second studio album Traumazine (2022). It was produced by Go Grizzly.

== Composition ==
Over a piano loop and yodeling sample, Megan Thee Stallion addresses her struggles with mental health (i.e. anxiety and post-traumatic stress), reflects on an apology intended for her late mother and if she would have been proud of her, and invokes the legacies of Marilyn Monroe, Britney Spears and Whitney Houston, while admitting that "bad bitches have bad days too".

== Critical reception ==
The song was met with generally positive reviews from critics. Will Dukes of Rolling Stone wrote, "There's a lucid humanistic feel to the song—enhanced by loopy pianos and a wailing vocal sample—that makes it somehow feel both insular and grand, like the tragic rich people's plights in a Sophia Coppola flick. But along with Megan's gracious confessions that 'bad bitches have bad days, too,' there's some real talk about loss ('It's crazy how I say the same prayer to the Lord and always get surprised by who he take') that hits you right in the heart." Emily Swingle of Clash wrote that Megan's name-dropping "only adds to the potency of her message; beneath the lavish lifestyle and media-trained visage, there's a tragic, seedier reality to infamy." Writing for The Guardian, Alexis Petridis praised the vocal sample, commenting that the song "makes it work". Kiann-Sian Williams of NME described it as "feel-good in its own way", in that it is a "frank tune where Megan mixes a little bit of wit with her honesty to make you feel better about your own problems." Pitchfork's Heven Haile gave a mixed review of the song, writing, "But even when she conveys emotionally raw thoughts, the tone of the production does not match the gravity of her words. The yodeling instrumental and upbeat piano distract from Meg's poignant musings about the apologies she'll never get to make to her late mother." NPR's Shamira Ibrahim wrote in a review of Traumazine, "The more introspective tracks, like 'Anxiety,' perform a sort of sleight of hand, expertly using upbeat production to cover darker material".

== Live performances ==
On October 16, 2022, Megan Thee Stallion performed the song on Saturday Night Live, along with a medley of "NDA" and "Plan B".

== Charts ==
Chart performance for "Anxiety"
Chart (2022)	Peak position
US Rap Digital Song Sales (Billboard)	12
US R&B/Hip-Hop Digital Songs (Billboard)	18

== Certifications ==
Certifications and sales for "Anxiety"
Region	Certification	Certified units/sales
United States (RIAA)	Gold	500,000^{‡}
^{‡} Sales+streaming figures based on certification alone.
