= Coming 2 America (soundtrack) =

2021 soundtrack albums

Coming 2 America (Amazon Original Motion Picture Soundtrack)

Soundtrack album by various artists
- Released: March 5, 2021
- Genre: Film soundtrack
- Length: 34:49
- Label: Def Jam Recordings

Singles from Coming 2 America (Amazon Original Motion Picture Soundtrack)
- 1. "I'm a King" Released: February 5, 2021; 2. "Go Big" Released: February 26, 2021

Coming 2 America (Amazon Original Motion Picture Soundtrack) is the soundtrack to the 2021 film Coming 2 America, serving as the sequel to the 1988 film Coming to America, with Eddie Murphy reprising his role from the original. The album featuring selections of pop hits, performed by Megan Thee Stallion, YG, Big Sean, John Legend, Teyana Taylor, Jermaine Fowler, Brandon Rogers, Beau Young Prince, Davido, Gladys Knight, Burna Boy, and Salt-N-Pepa, amongst others.

== Background ==
Like the predecessor, Coming 2 America had musical moments to tackle universal themes using the soundtrack combined with the film score. One of the first ideas, the director Craig Brewer pitched to Murphy was the "Gett Off" sequence which Brewer considered it to be his favorites; the song evolved during the dance sequence within Murphy's family. Randy Spendlove, president of music distribution and publishing at Paramount Pictures, helped Brewer to secure rights of the song from Prince's music catalog, as the song had to be recorded prior to shooting.

The musical catalogue consisted of an assortment of artists which led Spendlove collaborating with Def Jam Recordings to publish the film's soundtrack. Some of the musical numbers, such as "Whatta King" (performed by En Vogue and Salt-N-Pepa) and "Midnight Train to Zamunda" (performed by Gladys Knight) were pitched during the production. The latter is a take on Knight's own 1973 single "Midnight Train to Georgia". Brewer stated that "We got wind that she might be available and we discussed what we could do with her, and that was it" and eventually sang "Zamunda" instead of "Georgia" to connect with the film's story.

Brewer and Spendlove heard that Megan Thee Stallion was interested in contributing to the soundtrack, while the former wanted the song to be used in a film and shot additional scenes with KiKi Layne (who plays Meeka) for the original song "I'm a King", Stallion's inclusion was to personify Meeka's feelings.

== Marketing and release ==
The soundtrack was announced on February 4, 2021, with "I'm a King" being the first to be released as a single, the following day. The song was performed and produced by Bobby Sessions and Stallion. The second single "Go Big" was released on February 26. The full soundtrack was released on March 5, alongside the film.

== Track listing ==
No.	Title	Artist(s)	Length
1.	"Gett Off"	Teyana Taylor, Jermaine Fowler and Brandon Rogers	1:55
2.	"I'm A King"	Bobby Sessions and Megan Thee Stallion	3:16
3.	"We Got The Moves"	Beau Young Prince	2:22
4.	"Koroba"	Tiwa Savage	2:35
5.	"Go Big"	YG featuring Big Sean	2:49
6.	"Smash The Crowd"	Public Enemy featuring Ice-T and PMD	3:06
7.	"Assurance"	DaVido	4:02
8.	"Waka Waka"	Tekno	2:30
9.	"Midnight Train from Zamunda"	Gladys Knight	1:34
10.	"Whatta King/We Are Family Mashup"	En Vogue, Salt-N-Pepa, Randy Watson and Sexual Chocolate	2:41
11.	"These Streets"	Mi Casa	5:27
12.	"Coming 2 America"	John Legend and Burna Boy featuring Nile Rodgers	2:32
Total length:			34:49

== Charts ==
Chart (2021)	Peak position
UK Soundtrack Albums (OCC)	78
US Soundtrack Albums (Billboard)	23

== Score album ==
Coming 2 America (Amazon Original Motion Picture Score)

Film score by Jermaine Stegall
- Released: April 16, 2021
- Recorded: 2020–2021
- Genre: Film score
- Length: 50:17
- Label: Def Jam Recordings

Jermaine Stegall chronology
Canvas (2020)	Coming 2 America (2021)	Senior Year (2022)

Coming 2 America (Amazon Original Motion Picture Score) is the score album featuring 32 tracks from the film score composed by Jermaine Stegall, that spans for 50 minutes. Stegall composed the score on sets during the film's production that continued for seven months. He brought in a full orchestra, percussion and layered his melody on top of the cues, while also adding the Yoruba words, "kaabo si Ile-Ile" (transl. welcome to the motherland) as a tip hat to West African audiences.

The score album was released by Def Jam Recordings on April 16, 2021.

Track listing
No.	Title	Length
1.	"Main Titles"	1:37
2.	"McDowell's"	1:16
3.	"Sparring Session"	0:50
4.	"Nextdorian Arrival"	1:13
5.	"You Have A Son!"	0:56
6.	"The Wild Boar"	1:15
7.	"Celebration"	1:10
8.	"Next Mourning"	1:46
9.	"Back 2 America"	1:04
10.	"Gold Plane"	1:42
11.	"My African"	0:58
12.	"Got His Own Money"	1:12
13.	"Zamundan Blend"	1:12
14.	"Dinner Table"	1:48
15.	"Meeting Mirembe"	0:46
16.	"Izzi and Bopoto"	2:25
17.	"Princely Test"	1:17
18.	"Father, Son, and Babar"	2:10
19.	"Scouting And Planning"	1:34
20.	"Afro Grit"	2:27
21.	"Umba Juntu"	2:31
22.	"The Rose Garden"	4:07
23.	"Crowned Prince"	0:39
24.	"Mirembe's Theme"	2:07
25.	"Coronation"	1:20
26.	"The Princess And The Pawn"	1:53
27.	"A Father's Wisdom"	2:05
28.	"The Nuptials"	1:02
29.	"Return Of The General"	0:58
30.	"Running To Church"	1:12
31.	"Carry On"	1:28
32.	"Meeka's Showdown"	2:17
Total length:		50:17

== Concept album ==
A concept album based on the film was curated and executive produced by Sipho Dlamini, CEO of Universal Music South Africa. Titled as Rhythms of Zamunda, the soundtrack was released through Def Jam Recordings Africa on March 5, 2021.
