= Enzo McFly =

American rapper

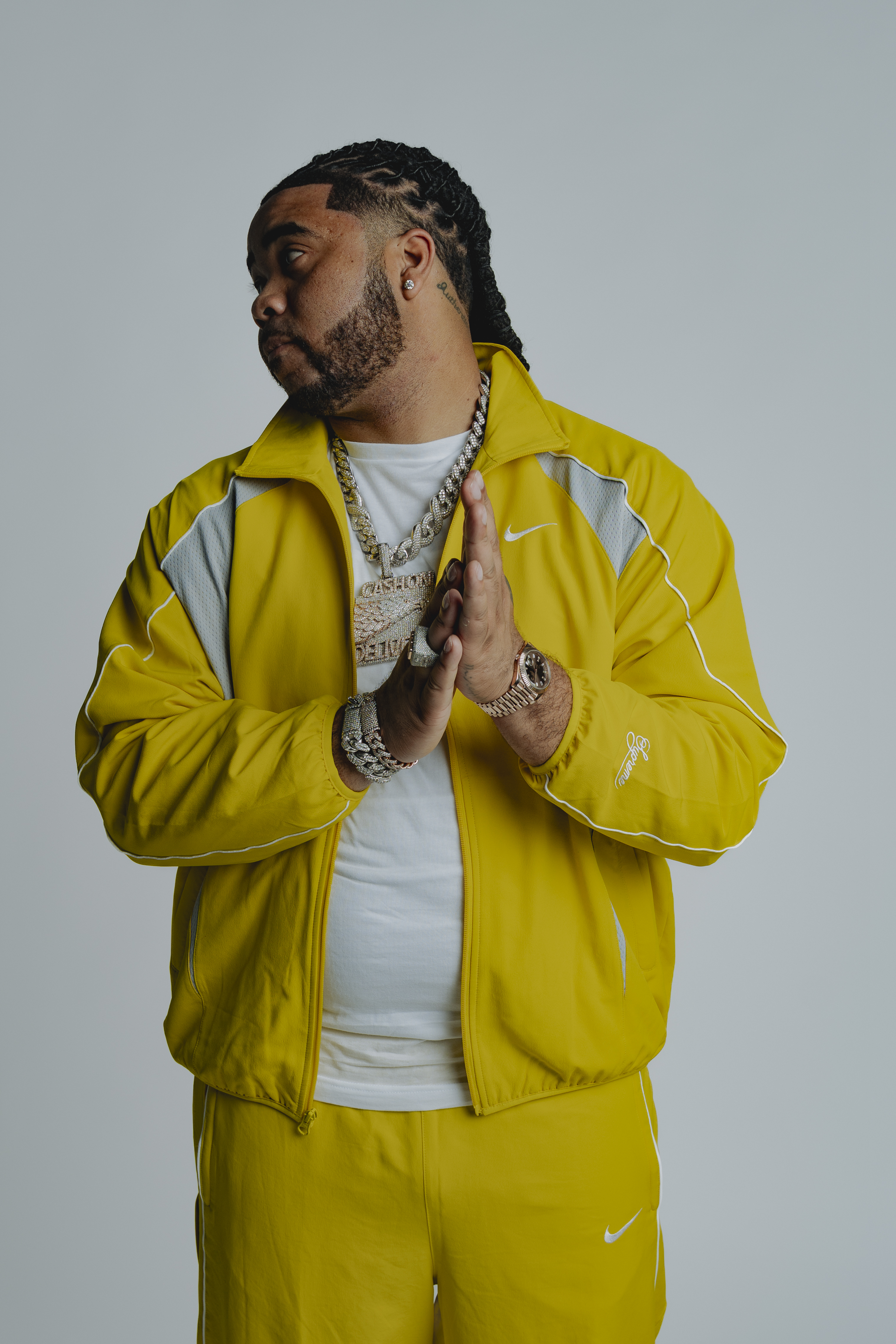
- McFly in 2025

Background information
- Origin: Houston, Texas, U.S.
- Genres: Hip hop, Rap
- Occupations: Entrepreneur and Musician
- Years active: 2018–present
- Label: 1501 Certified Entertainment

Enzo McFly is an American entrepreneur and musician from Houston, Texas. He gained attention with his debut album, The Youngest Veteran in 2018 and has collaborated with artists such as Megan Thee Stallion, Yung Bleu, and Lil Baby.

== Early life and education ==
McFly was raised on the south side of Houston, Texas. He recorded his first song at the age of seven and continued to release music throughout his teenage years. After graduating from high school, he pursued a full-time career in music.

== Career ==
In May 2018, McFly released his debut album, The Youngest Veteran, through the label 1501 Certified Entertainment. The album featured notable collaborations, including the song “Bae” with rapper Yung Bleu and the single “You Got It” featuring fellow Houston artists Trill Sammy and Megan Thee Stallion. That same year, he released the single “That’s a Bet” with Atlanta-based rapper Lil Baby. Following a shooting incident in Houston, he released the tribute song “Love You Deserve” in December 2018.

In 2019, McFly released two EPs, Next To Blow and All In, and joined Houston rapper Kirko Bangz on the “Still Progressing” tour. He continued to release singles in the subsequent years, including “Fold On Me” featuring Quando Rondo in 2021. In June 2024, he released the full-length album ChoZen One in a joint initiative with Create Music Group. In 2025, McFly was a showcasing artist at the South by Southwest (SXSW) music festival in Austin, Texas.

== Discography ==
Albums

- The Youngest Veteran (2018)
- Next To Blow (2019)
- All In (2019)
- ChoZen One (2024)
