= Ungrateful (song) =

2022 song by Megan Thee Stallion featuring Key Glock

Song by Megan Thee Stallion featuring Key Glock

from the album Traumazine
- Released: August 12, 2022
- Genre: Hip hop; trap
- Length: 2:34
- Label: 1501; 300
- Songwriters: Megan Pete; Krishon Gaines; Markeyvius Cathey
- Producer: Bandplay

Music video
- "Ungrateful" on YouTube

"Ungrateful" is a song by American rapper-songwriter Megan Thee Stallion featuring fellow American rapper Key Glock, from the former's second studio album Traumazine (2022). It was produced by Bandplay.

== Composition ==
The song features a "menacing" trap beat, over which Megan Thee Stallion and Key Glock criticize former associates, whom the former describes as "fake-ass, snake-ass, cake-ass, hating-ass, no money getting-ass bitches".

== Critical reception ==
A.D. Amorosi of Variety wrote that the artists "make 'Ungrateful' into a dramatic dialog on a concept as oblique as thanklessness", and described the lyrics "You would never be you if I wasn't your muse" as "one smartly, spiteful line sticking out". Shamira Ibrahim of NPR praised Megan Thee Stallion's rapping style, writing that the song "is in conversation with her cult-favorite 'Still Tippin' Freestyle' — doubling down on the whiplashing flows of that verse, she swings her bars around the highs and lows of the melody. The ease with which Megan navigates collaborations with producers and rappers from Memphis only reinforces the strains of the one-time Three 6 Mafia member Gangsta Boo in her DNA."

== Music video ==
The official music video premiered on September 6, 2022. Directed by Colin Tilley, it opens with Megan Thee Stallion lying on a red quilt on her bed, dressed in black lingerie, rolling around and rapping. She then dresses for a funeral in all-black attire, including a floor-trailing dress, corset and veil, and struts down a hallway before arriving at a crowded funeral in the night. There, she places a black rose on the casket and raps in the cemetery as well. As Megan sheds a tear and a rainstorm begins, an alternate version of herself appears, wearing all-white attire (possibly in reference to her alter-ego Tina Snow) consisting of a dress and exceptionally large wide-brimmed floppy hat protecting her from the rain. The alternate Megan picks up Key Glock, who dons a glittery cardigan and bejeweled dolphin chain. Glock begins rapping from the porch of an ivy-vined house, and rides shotgun to Megan as she drives through the intensifying storm.

== Charts ==
Chart performance for "Ungrateful"
| Chart (2022) | Peak position |
|---|---|
| New Zealand Hot Singles (RMNZ) | 28 |
| US Billboard Hot 100 | 82 |
| US Hot R&B/Hip-Hop Songs (Billboard) | 29 |
