= Bailey Bryan =

American country singer (born 1998)

- Born: Bailey Myown Bryan; January 31, 1998 (age 28); Freeland, Washington
- Origin: Sequim, Washington
- Genres: Pop R&B Country Music
- Occupation: Singer-songwriter
- Instrument: Guitar
- Years active: 2016–present
- Labels: 300 Entertainment; Warner Music Nashville

Bailey Myown Bryan is an American singer-songwriter based in Nashville. Her debut single "Own It" was released as the lead single from her debut EP titled “So Far...” the single debuted at number 60 on the U.S. Country Airplay chart.

In October 2019, Bryan released her country/pop sophomore EP titled “Perspective”, with the titled track as the lead single. It spawned 5 singles and the videos have around 100-200k views on YouTube as of December 2020. In June 2020, Bryan redefined her music as SBB (“Sensitive Bad Bitches”), representing more of an R&B/pop style.

Bryan released the lead single from her upcoming debut album/project titled “Fresh Start” in December 2020. She told fans on Instagram & YouTube that she will release a single or track every month until the release date.

== Early life ==
Bailey Bryan was born in Sequim, Washington. She began writing songs at age 12 and busking locally before signing a publishing deal and relocating to Nashville.

== Career ==
In 2016, Bryan was nominated by Hillary Scott as an Artist of Tomorrow by the Grammys. In 2017, Bryan released "Own It" as her first single, which debuted at number 60 on the U.S. Country Airplay chart. In April 2017, she released her debut extended play So Far. In October 2017, she released a cover of Drake's "Too Good". In early 2018, Billboard named her one of "15 Country Artists to Watch in 2018". She released the single "Songbird" in November 2018. In May 2019, she released another Drake cover of "One Dance" with UK artist Kyla, who Drake originally sampled the song from. The song premiered through Clash magazine. That same month, she released the single "Perspective". In October 2019, she released the EP Perspective, as well as a music video for the song "Where We Started" from the EP, which starred Mike Johnson from The Bachelorette. On June 26, she released the song "play w/ me".

== Artistry ==
Bryan dubbed her songwriting as primarily deriving from pop, R&B, country, and hip hop styles, and stated that her music is influenced by Taylor Swift and The Chicks.

== Discography ==
=== Extended plays ===
Title	EP details
So Far	Released: April 14, 2017; Label: 300 Entertainment, Warner Music Nashville; Format: Digital download
Perspective	Released: October 11, 2019; Label: 300 Entertainment, Warner Music Nashville; Format: Digital download

=== Singles ===
Title	Year	Peak chart positions	Album
Title	Year	U.S. Country Airplay	Album
"Own It"	2017	60	So Far EP
"Songbird"	2018	-	Non-album single
"Perspective"	2019	-	Non-album single
"play w/ me"	2020	-	Non-album single
“Roster”	2020	-	Non-album single
“Steal Your Girl”	2020	-	Non-album single
“Fresh Start”	2020	-	Fresh Start

=== Music videos ===
Own It - 2017

Hard Drive Home - 2017

Go Tell It On The Mountain - 2017

Songbird - 2018

Songbird (Vertical) - 2019

Perspective - 2019

Where We Started - 2019

Pressure - 2020

Watered Down - 2020

Play w/ me - 2020

Roster - 2020

Steal Your Girl - 2020

Fresh Start (Visualizer) - 2020

Play w/ me (Sensitive Version) - 2021

Sober - 2021

Don’t Call Me - 2021

Temporary - 2021

Dark In The Morning - 2021

MF (feat. 24k Goldn) - 2022

Passion - 2022

Tragic - 2022

RIP - 2023

== Tours ==
Headlining
Supporting

- The Hometown Proud Tour with Kane Brown (2017)
- The Obsessed Tour with Dan + Shay (2017)
- The Unapologetically Tour with Kelsea Ballerini (2018)
- Gone West (2019)
