= Sweetest Pie =

2022 single by Megan Thee Stallion and Dua Lipa

Single by Megan Thee Stallion and Dua Lipa

from the album Traumazine
- Released: March 11, 2022
- Recorded: 2021
- Genre: Pop rap
- Length: 3:21
- Label: 1501 Certified; 300
- Composers: Dua Lipa; Clarence Coffee Jr.; Joshua Isaiah Parker; Sarah Hudson; Stephen Kozmeniuk; Ingo Peter Schwartz; Orlando Levene Johnson; Fabio Raponi
- Lyricists: Megan Pete; Nija Aisha-Alayja Charles
- Producers: OG Parker; Romano; Platinum Library

Megan Thee Stallion singles chronology
| "Lick" (2022) | "Sweetest Pie" (2022) | "Plan B" (2022) |

Dua Lipa singles chronology
| "Cold Heart (Pnau remix)" (2021) | "Sweetest Pie" (2022) | "Potion" (2022) |

Music video
- "Sweetest Pie" on YouTube

"Sweetest Pie" is a song by American rapper Megan Thee Stallion and English singer Dua Lipa, released on March 11, 2022, through 1501 Certified and 300 Entertainment. The song serves as the lead single from Megan Thee Stallion's second studio album Traumazine.

== Background, release and lyrics ==
In June 2021, Megan Thee Stallion expressed her admiration for Dua Lipa and her interest in doing a collaboration, referring to a viral mashup of her song "Fkn Around" (2020) with Lipa's 2020 hit "Levitating". Lipa responded on Instagram saying she would love to do a collaboration with Megan Thee Stallion. Megan Thee Stallion and Lipa began teasing the collaboration in February 2022 after the latter artist addressed the former as "thee sweetest pie" when sending her a pie for her birthday. That same month, Megan Thee Stallion teased that her next single would be with someone her fans might have guessed before and it was a song unexpected for her and "different".

On March 6, 2022, Megan Thee Stallion and Lipa formally announced their collaboration. The former released a promotional image of the two artists' faces iced onto cakes while the latter shared a 5-second snippet of the track accompanied by a video of a text conversation between the two in which they shared images of them together. They revealed the cover art and title as "Sweetest Pie" the following day. The track was released on March 11, 2022. The remixes EP by David Guetta was released on April 22.

The song interpolates the 1999 UK Garage hit Movin' Too Fast by vocalist Romina Johnson & the DJ/producer duo Artful Dodger and credits its song writers Orlando Levene Johnson (Romina's uncle), Fabio Raponi and Ingo Peter Schwartz.

== Commercial performance ==
In the US, "Sweetest Pie" debuted at number 15 on the Billboard Hot 100, becoming Lipa's highest debut on the chart, her sixth top 20 single and Megan Thee Stallion's eighth. The song also charted in the top 20 in Canada and Ireland. On the UK Singles Chart, "Sweetest Pie" entered at number 31 with first-week sales of 12,344 units.

== Music video ==
The music video for "Sweetest Pie" accompanied the song's release and was directed by Dave Meyers, with a concept created by Megan Thee Stallion. The music video is inspired by "Hansel and Gretel" by "welcoming a duo of unsuspecting men into their lair — ultimately luring them to their deaths."

== Live performances ==
On March 15, 2022, Lipa brought out Megan Thee Stallion during her Future Nostalgia Tour at Ball Arena in Denver, Colorado to perform the collaboration. This marks the first time they performed the song live together. Megan Thee Stallion also performed "Sweetest Pie" at the 2022 iHeartRadio Music Awards on March 22, and at the Coachella Valley Music and Arts Festival on April 16.

== Track listing ==
- Digital download and streaming
1. "Sweetest Pie" – 3:21
- Digital download and streaming – David Guetta remixes
1. "Sweetest Pie" (David Guetta dance remix) – 2:23
2. "Sweetest Pie" (David Guetta festival remix) – 3:00
3. "Sweetest Pie" (David Guetta dance remix extended) – 3:14
4. "Sweetest Pie" (David Guetta festival remix extended) – 3:56

== Personnel ==
Credits adapted from Qobuz.

- Megan Thee Stallion – vocals
- Dua Lipa – vocals
- Romano – production
- OG Parker – production
- Platinum Library – production
- Koz – additional production
- Shawn "Source" Jarrett – vocal recording engineer
- Mark Shick – vocal recording engineer
- Mike Dean – mixing, mastering

== Charts ==
=== Weekly charts ===
Weekly chart performance
| Chart (2022) | Peak position |
|---|---|
| Australia (ARIA) | 24 |
| Belgium (Ultratop 50 Wallonia) | 42 |
| Brazil (Pop Internacional) | 10 |
| Canada Hot 100 (Billboard) | 19 |
| Canada CHR/Top 40 (Billboard) | 10 |
| Canada Hot AC (Billboard) | 32 |
| Croatia International (HRT) | 22 |
| France (SNEP) | 153 |
| Germany (GfK) | 76 |
| Global 200 (Billboard) | 12 |
| Greece International (IFPI) | 35 |
| Hungary (Rádiós Top 40) | 5 |
| Ireland (IRMA) | 14 |
| Lithuania (AGATA) | 49 |
| Mexico (Billboard Mexican Airplay) | 35 |
| Netherlands (Single Tip) | 5 |
| New Zealand (Recorded Music NZ) | 33 |
| Nicaragua (Monitor Latino) | 17 |
| Poland Airplay (ZPAV) | 61 |
| Portugal (AFP) | 69 |
| San Marino (SMRRTV Top 50) | 24 |
| Slovakia Airplay (ČNS IFPI) | 69 |
| Slovakia Singles Digital (ČNS IFPI) | 100 |
| South Africa Streaming (TOSAC) | 85 |
| Sweden (Sverigetopplistan) | 59 |
| Switzerland (Schweizer Hitparade) | 54 |
| UK Singles (OCC) | 31 |
| US Billboard Hot 100 | 15 |
| US Adult Pop Airplay (Billboard) | 24 |
| US Dance/Mix Show Airplay (Billboard) | 6 |
| US Hot Rap Songs (Billboard) | 3 |
| US Pop Airplay (Billboard) | 5 |
| US Rhythmic Airplay (Billboard) | 8 |
| Vietnam (Vietnam Hot 100) | 35 |

=== Year-end charts ===
Year-end chart performance
| Chart (2022) | Position |
|---|---|
| Canada (Canadian Hot 100) | 79 |
| Global 200 (Billboard) | 186 |
| US Billboard Hot 100 | 62 |
| US Mainstream Top 40 (Billboard) | 23 |
| US Rhythmic (Billboard) | 42 |

Year-end chart performance
| Chart (2023) | Position |
|---|---|
| Hungary (Rádiós Top 40) | 95 |

== Certifications ==
Certifications and sales
| Region | Certification | Certified units/sales |
|---|---|---|
| Brazil (Pro-Música Brasil) | Platinum | 40,000^{‡} |
| Canada (Music Canada) | Platinum | 80,000^{‡} |
| New Zealand (RMNZ) | Platinum | 30,000^{‡} |
| Poland (ZPAV) | Gold | 25,000^{‡} |
| Portugal (AFP) | Gold | 5,000^{‡} |
| United Kingdom (BPI) | Silver | 200,000^{‡} |
| United States (RIAA) | Platinum | 1,000,000^{‡} |
^{‡} Sales+streaming figures based on certification alone.

== Release history ==
Release dates and formats
| Region | Date | Format(s) | Version(s) | Label(s) | Ref. |
|---|---|---|---|---|---|
| Various | March 11, 2022 | CD; digital download; streaming | Original | 1501 Certified; 300 | |
| Various | March 11, 2022 | Digital download; streaming | Original | 1501 Certified; 300 | |
| Italy | March 11, 2022 | Radio airplay | Original | Warner | |
| United States | March 14, 2022 | Adult contemporary radio | Original | 1501 Certified; 300 | |
| United States | March 15, 2022 | Contemporary hit radio | Original | 1501 Certified; 300 | |
| United States | March 15, 2022 | Rhythmic contemporary radio | Original | 1501 Certified; 300 | |
| Various | April 22, 2022 | Digital download; streaming | David Guetta remixes | 1501 Certified; 300 | |

== Awards and nominations ==
| Year | Ceremony | Category | Result |
|---|---|---|---|
| 2023 | Nickelodeon Kids Choice Award | Collaboration | Won |
