= Des Rocs =

American rock musician

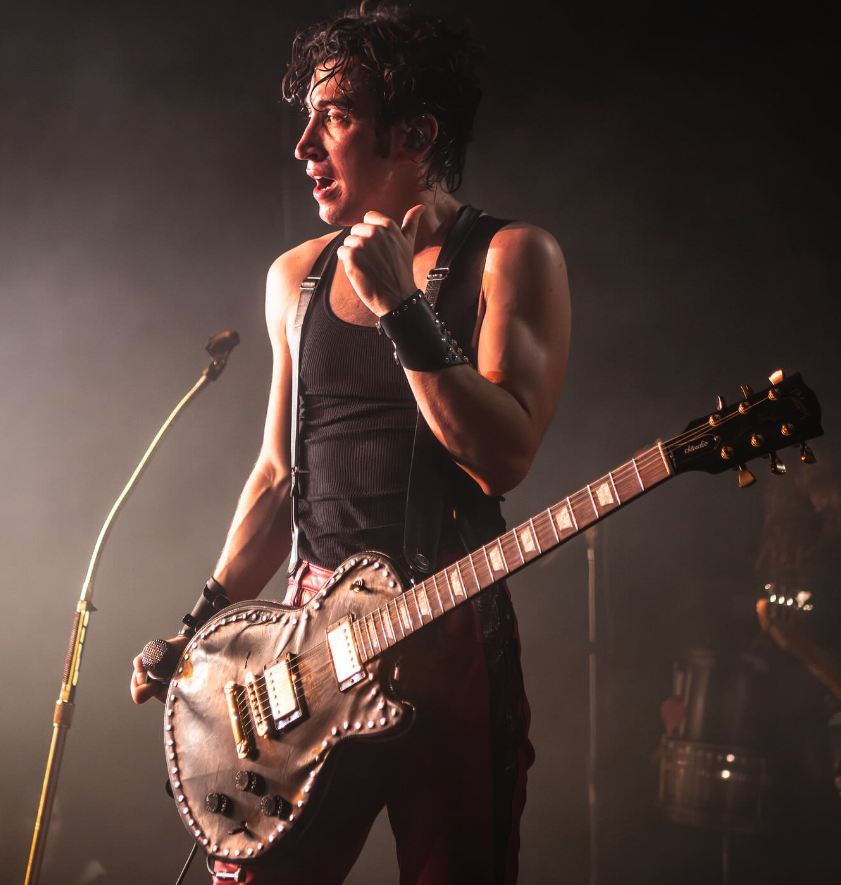
- Des Rocs performing in 2020

Background information
- Born: Danny Rocco; Rockville Centre, New York, U.S.
- Genres: Hard rock; glam rock; alternative rock
- Years active: 2018–present
- Labels: Sumerian Records; 300 Entertainment; Lowly
- Website: desrocs.com

Danny Rocco, also known as Des Rocs (/ˌdɛz rɔːks/), is an American rock musician from New York City. Des Rocs is a solo project produced and led by Danny Rocco. When touring, Rocco is joined by his long time friends and bandmates, William Tully and Eric Mendelsohn.

Des Rocs has toured with rock bands such as Muse, The Rolling Stones, The Cult, Kaleo and The Struts. In 2025 Des Rocs collaborated with Zayn Malik to write and produce Malik's new single "Break Free". In 2025, he composed the opening theme song for the Borderlands 4 video game. Influences for Rocco include Muse, Elvis Presley, Jimi Hendrix, Roy Orbison, and Queen, though Rocco's focus is individuality and sounding unlike other rock artists.

== History ==
=== Origins and EPs (2018–2020) ===
Rocco was raised in Long Island's Nassau County. He began performing in bars and basements from as early as 13 years old. His first band Secret Weapons opened for bands such as Panic! at the Disco, Fall Out Boy, and Weezer. The band eventually went on permanent hiatus after bandmate Gerry Lange's health deteriorated with Lyme disease. He released his first EP, Let The Vultures In, in November 2018.

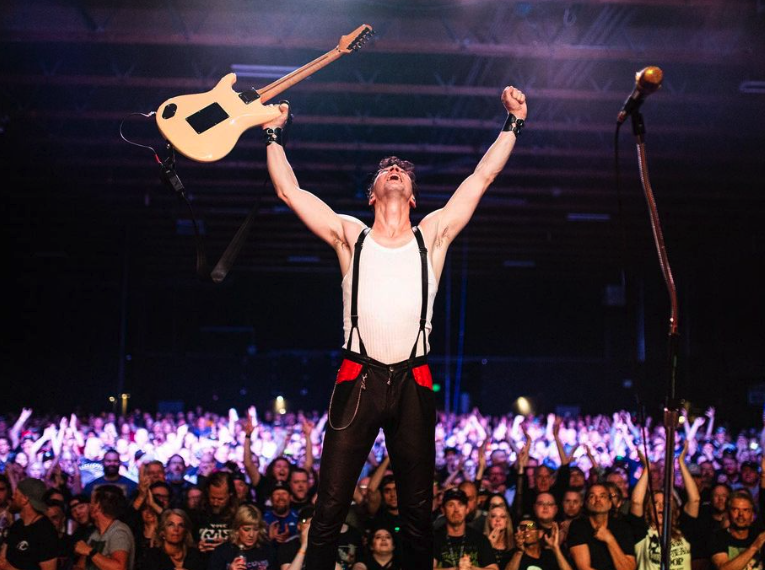
Des Rocs performing live at the Complex in Utah in 2022

=== Alive tour and A Real Good Person In A Real Bad Place (2021) ===
In the spring of 2021, Des Rocs announced the Alive tour and a virtual livestream concert (also called the "Des Rocs Alive Virtual Concert"). During the live dates of the tour, rock band The Velveteers accompanied the tour as the opening band. Kicking off in the fall of 2021, the tour spanned 20+ cities across the United States, ending in the New York City's Bowery Ballroom. During the virtual concert, which was the first live playthrough of This is Our Life, Des Rocs culminated with the track "Tick" from his then yet-to-be-announced album. The track's lyrics also hinted at the title of the new album, A Real Good Person In A Real Bad Place.

The album title and tracklist was announced on July 30, 2021, coinciding with the release of the album's first single, "MMC" (Mickey Mouse Club). Des Rocs released two more singles before the album's debut: "Imaginary Friends" and "Hanging by a Thread".

=== Dream Machine (2023) ===
Des Rocs supported Badflower on their "Asking For A Friend" tour, alongside Blood Red Shoes. They debuted a new song, "Never Ending Moment", during this tour, and officially released it on April 25, 2023. At the same time, it was announced that the band had signed with Sumerian Records. On June 13, Des Rocs released the single "Nowhere Kid" from the album "Dream Machine", which released on August 25, 2023.

== Discography ==
=== Studio albums ===
List of studio albums, with release date, label and selected chart positions shown
Title	Album details	Peak chart positions	
Title	Album details	US	US Rock
A Real Good Person in a Real Bad Place	Released: September 24, 2021; Label: 300 Entertainment; Format: Digital download, LP, streaming	—	—
Dream Machine	Released: August 25, 2023; Label: Sumerian Records; Format: Digital download, LP, CD streaming	—	—
To Hell and Back	Released: June 12, 2026; Label: Sumerian Records; Format: Digital download, LP, CD streaming	—	—

=== EPs ===
List of EPs, with release date and label shown
Title	EP details
Let the Vultures In	Released: November 2, 2018; Label: Self-released; Format: Digital download, streaming
Martyr Parade	Released: November 22, 2019; Label: Lowly; Format: Digital download, streaming
This Is Our Life	Released: December 11, 2020; Label: 300 Entertainment; Format: LP, Digital download, streaming

=== Singles ===
List of singles, showing year released and album name
Title	Year	Peak chart positions			Album
Title	Year	US Alt.	US Main.	US Rock Alt Air.	Album
"Used to the Darkness"	2018	—	—	—	Let the Vultures In
"Let Me Live / Let Me Die"	2018	—	—	—	Let the Vultures In
"Maybe, I"	2018	—	—	—	Let the Vultures In
"Outta My Mind"	2019	—	—	—	Martyr Parade
"Dead Ringer"	2019	—	—	—	Martyr Parade
"SLO"	2019	—	—	—	Martyr Parade
"This Is Our Life"	2020	36	23	—	This Is Our Life
"Nothing Personal"	2020	—	—	—	This Is Our Life
"Wayne"	2020	—	—	—	Non-album single
"I Know"	2020	—	—	—	Non-album single
"MMC"	2021	—	—	—	A Real Good Person In A Real Bad Place
"Imaginary Friends"	2021	—	—	—	A Real Good Person In A Real Bad Place
"Hanging by a Thread"	2021	—	—	—	A Real Good Person In A Real Bad Place
"Manic Memories"	2022	—	—	—	Non-album single
"Never Ending Moment"	2023	—	29	—	Dream Machine
"Nowhere Kid"	2023	—	—	—	Dream Machine
"I Am the Lightning"	2023	—	6	20	Dream Machine
"In the Night" (original or with Underoath)	2024	—	—	—	Dream Machine
"This Land"	2025	—	9	21	Borderlands 4/To Hell and Back
"The Juice"	2025	—	—	—	To Hell and Back
"When the Love Is Gone"	2026	—	22	—	To Hell and Back
"The Riders of Red Hook (Legends Never Die)"	2026	—	—	—	To Hell and Back
"Fall Together"	2026	—	—	—	To Hell and Back

=== Other appearances ===
Title	Year	Band	Album
"Bullet with Butterfly Wings"	2026	The Smashing Pumpkins	Sending Hearts To All My Dearies: A Tribute To The Smashing Pumpkins

=== Music Videos ===
List of music videos, showing year released and director
Year	Title	Producer	Director	Ref.
2018	"HVY MTL DRMR"		Kristjan Thor	
2020	"Wayne"	Des Rocs	Des Rocs and Tnsn Dvsn	
2020	"I Know"	Des Rocs	Des Rocs and Dan Newman	
2020	"This Is Our Life"	Dreambear	Rock & Egg	
2020	"Nothing Personal"			
2020	"POS"			
2020	"Suicide Romantics"			
2020	"Pieces" (Version 1)			
2021	"Pieces" (Version 2)		Rock and Egg	
2021	"MMC"		Bobby Hanaford	
2021	"Ruby with the Sharpest Lies"		Des Rocs and Austin Kearns	
2021	"Imaginary Friends"			
2022	"Hanging by a Thread"			
2022	"Manic Memories"		Dan Newman & Joel Cook	
2023	"Never Ending Moment"		Wouter Stoter	
2023	"Nowhere Kid"			
2023	"Dream Machine"		Wouter Stoter	
2024	"I Am the Lightning"			
2024	"In the Night"		Mark Seliger	
2024	"Love and a Smoking Gun"			
2025	"This Land"		fesq	
2026	"When the Love Is Gone"		Noel Paul	
2026	"Fall Together"		Noel Paul	
