= Pressurelicious =

2022 single by Megan Thee Stallion featuring Future

Single by Megan Thee Stallion featuring Future

from the album Traumazine
- Released: July 21, 2022
- Genre: Hip hop; trap
- Length: 2:53
- Label: 1501 Certified; 300
- Songwriters: Megan Pete; Nayvadius Wilburn; Harald Hjermann Sørebø; Jorden Thorpe; Anthony Holmes
- Producers: Hitkidd; Payday

Megan Thee Stallion singles chronology
| "Plan B" (2022) | "Pressurelicious" (2022) | "Her" (2022) |

Future singles chronology
| "Keep It Burnin" (2022) | "Pressurelicious" (2022) | "Love You Better" (2022) |

"Pressurelicious" is a song by American rapper and songwriter Megan Thee Stallion featuring fellow American rapper Future, released on July 21, 2022 through 1501 Certified and 300 Entertainment. It was produced by Hitkidd and serves as the third single from the former's second studio album Traumazine.

== Background ==
In an interview with Rolling Stone in June 2022, Megan Thee Stallion previewed the song and expressed her admiration of Future, saying:

He just so fucking ratchet! He is unapologetically himself. I appreciate that about anybody who gets up and has to do anything in the public eye. Anybody who has to read about their life online every day and deal with so many energies and can put it out into their music and do it gracefully, I feel like you deserve your flowers.

The song was scheduled to be released on July 22, 2022 at midnight, but was released three hours early due to it leaking online.

== Composition ==
"Pressurelicious" is a trap song containing dark, dissonant production. In the opening verse, Megan Thee Stallion raps about being a strong and confident woman, as well as her Birkin bag. Future raps from the perspective of a "loving and supportive partner who does not feel emasculated", coupled with lyrics relating to sex and putting his partner before luxury. In the final two verses, the rappers exchange playful and sexually explicit lyrics.

== Charts ==
Chart performance for "Pressurelicious"
| Chart (2022) | Peak position |
|---|---|
| Global 200 (Billboard) | 187 |
| New Zealand Hot Singles (RMNZ) | 18 |
| US Billboard Hot 100 | 55 |
| US Hot R&B/Hip-Hop Songs (Billboard) | 14 |
| US R&B/Hip-Hop Airplay (Billboard) | 20 |
| US Rhythmic Airplay (Billboard) | 26 |
