= B.I.T.C.H. =

2020 single by Megan Thee Stallion

Single by Megan Thee Stallion

from the EP Suga
- Released: January 24, 2020
- Recorded: 2019
- Genre: Hip-hop; R&B
- Length: 3:03
- Label: 1501 Certified; 300
- Songwriters: Megan Pete; Martin McCurtis; Gary Cooper; George Clinton, Jr.; William Collins; Tupac Shakur; Douglass Rasheed
- Producer: Helluva

Megan Thee Stallion singles chronology
| "Diamonds" (2020) | "B.I.T.C.H." (2020) | "Captain Hook" (2020) |

Music video
- "B.I.T.C.H" on YouTube

"B.I.T.C.H." is a song by American rapper Megan Thee Stallion. It was released as the lead single from her third EP Suga, on January 24, 2020. The song was met with positive reviews and it charted at number 31 on the Billboard Hot 100. Megan performed the song on The Tonight Show Starring Jimmy Fallon to promote it.

== Background and release ==
The lead single of Suga, "B.I.T.C.H." was released on January 24, 2020. It is described as a song where Megan "confronts an inept boyfriend who's ignoring her feelings" and received praise from Pitchfork due to the fact that "her trademark confidence complements the slinky retro beat". The song samples Bootsy's Rubber Band' "I'd Rather Be With You" (1976) and Tupac Shakur's "Ratha Be Ya Nigga" (1996).

The song debuted and peaked at number 31 on the Billboard Hot 100 and at number 9 on the Rolling Stone 100, with 12.5 million streams on its first tracking week.

== Live performances ==
The single was promoted with a performance on The Tonight Show Starring Jimmy Fallon, where Megan sings and raps, dressed in a red belted body suit, alongside two backup dancers on a fog-filled stage.

== Music video ==
An accompanying video for the song was released on March 6, 2020, along with the EP's release. The music video, directed by Eif Rivera, introduces the alter-ego Suga, who rides in a Rolls-Royce with Tina Snow (Megan's other alter-ego), walks her dogs in a leopard suit and twerks in a Jacuzzi.

== Chart performance ==
The song debuted and peaked at number 31 on the Billboard Hot 100 and at number 9 on the Rolling Stone 100, with 12.5 million streams on its first tracking week.

== Charts ==
=== Weekly charts ===
Weekly chart performance for "B.I.T.C.H."
| Chart (2020) | Peak position |
|---|---|
| New Zealand Hot Singles (RMNZ) | 12 |
| US Billboard Hot 100 | 31 |
| US Hot R&B/Hip-Hop Songs (Billboard) | 15 |
| US R&B/Hip-Hop Airplay (Billboard) | 12 |

=== Year-end charts ===
Year-end chart performance for "B.I.T.C.H."
| Chart (2020) | Position |
|---|---|
| US Hot R&B/Hip-Hop Songs (Billboard) | 94 |

== Certifications ==
Certifications for "B.I.T.C.H."
| Region | Certification | Certified units/sales |
|---|---|---|
| United States (RIAA) | Platinum | 1,000,000^{‡} |
^{‡} Sales+streaming figures based on certification alone.
