= Her (song) =

2022 single by Megan Thee Stallion

Single by Megan Thee Stallion

from the album Traumazine
- Released: August 15, 2022
- Genre: Hip house
- Length: 2:17
- Label: 1501 Certified; 300
- Songwriters: Megan Pete; Alex Petit; Kiowa Roukema; Malibu Babie; Vaughn Oliver
- Producers: CashMoneyAP; YoungKio; Babie; Oliver

Megan Thee Stallion singles chronology
"Pressurelicious" (2022)	"Her" (2022)	"Bongos" (2023)

Music video
- "Her" on YouTube

"Her" is a song by American rapper-songwriter Megan Thee Stallion from her second studio album Traumazine (2022). The song was released on August 15, 2022, and was produced by CashMoneyAP, YoungKio, Malibu Babie and Vaugh Oliver.

== Composition ==
"Her" is a hip house song that finds Megan Thee Stallion boastfully rapping about her pride as a woman, as well as dismissing her haters and negative criticism toward her. Craig Jenkins of Vulture described the song as starting with "'80s-party-rap bars but switches to Biggie flows in verse two."

== Critical reception ==
The song received generally positive reviews from music critics. Abby Jones of Consequence praised the song, writing, "'Her' is upbeat, but where Good News felt like she was brushing off the pain, the new song sounds like she's finding the light at the end of the tunnel after she's finally processed it all." Adrianne Reece of Elite Daily wrote, "Though the lyrics are simple, the rapper's charismatic delivery accentuates the track's throbbing production in the grooviest way. Seriously, there's no way you can listen to this rightfully boastful number without belting the chorus."

== Live performances ==
On August 12, 2022, Megan Thee Stallion performed the song on Good Morning America.

== Music video ==
The official music video was directed by Colin Tilley and released on August 15, 2022. Shot in black and white, the video sees Megan Thee Stallion delivering "statuesque poses", performing choreography with a group of dancers in matching outfits and facing against a clone of herself.

== Accolades ==
Awards and nominations for "Her"
Organization	Year	Category	Result	Ref.
MTV Video Music Awards	2023	Best Direction	Nominated	
MTV Video Music Awards	2023	Best Art Direction	Nominated	
MTV Video Music Awards	2023	Best Choreography	Nominated	

== Charts ==
Chart performance for "Her"
Chart (2022)	Peak position
Global 200 (Billboard)	164
New Zealand Hot Singles (RMNZ)	6
US Billboard Hot 100	62
US Hot R&B/Hip-Hop Songs (Billboard)	19
US R&B/Hip-Hop Airplay (Billboard)	27
US Rhythmic Airplay (Billboard)	24

== Certifications ==
Certifications and sales for "Her"
Region	Certification	Certified units/sales
United States (RIAA)	Gold	500,000^{‡}
^{‡} Sales+streaming figures based on certification alone.
