= We Will Rock You =

1977 single by Queen

- One of the French single picture sleeves

Single by Queen

from the album News of the World
- A-side: "We Are the Champions"
- Released: 7 October 1977
- Studio: Wessex Sound, London
- Genre: Arena rock
- Length: 2:02
- Label: EMI (UK); Elektra (US)
- Songwriter: Brian May
- Producers: Queen; Mike Stone

Queen singles chronology
"Long Away" (1977)	"We Will Rock You" and "We Are the Champions" (1977)	"Spread Your Wings" (1978)

Music video
- "We Will Rock You" on YouTube

"We Will Rock You" is a song by the British rock band Queen from their 1977 album News of the World, written by guitarist Brian May. Rolling Stone ranked it number 330 of "The 500 Greatest Songs of All Time" in 2004, and the RIAA it placed at number 146 on the Songs of the Century list in 2001. In 2009, "We Will Rock You" was inducted into the Grammy Hall of Fame.

Other than the last 30 seconds, which contains a guitar solo by May, the song is generally set in a cappella form, using only stomping and clapping as a rhythmic body percussion beat. In 1977, "We Will Rock You" and "We Are the Champions" were issued together as a worldwide top 10 single. Soon after the album was released, many radio stations played the songs consecutively, without interruption.

Since its release, "We Will Rock You" has been covered, remixed, sampled, parodied, referred to, and used by multiple recording artists, TV shows, films and other media worldwide. It has also become a popular stadium anthem at sports events around the world, mostly due to its simple rhythm. On 7 October 2017, Queen released a Raw Sessions version of the track to celebrate the 40th anniversary of the release of News of the World. It features a radically different approach to the guitar solo and includes May's count-in immediately prior to the recording.

== Music ==
"We Will Rock You" was written in response to an event that occurred during the A Day at the Races Tour. The band played at Stafford's Bingley Hall, and, according to Brian May:

We did an encore and then went off, and instead of just keeping clapping, they sang "You'll Never Walk Alone" to us, and we were just completely knocked out and taken aback – it was quite an emotional experience really, and I think these chant things are in some way connected with that.

"We Will Rock You"
The "stomp, stomp, clap" beat throughout "We Will Rock You" was created by the band overdubbing sounds of themselves stamping and clapping many times, then adding delay effects to create a sound that made it seem as if many people were participating.

One version was used as the opening track on 1977's News of the World. This consists of a stomp-stomp-clap-pause beat, and a power chorus, being somewhat of an anthem. The stamping effects were created by the band overdubbing the sounds of themselves stomping on the Wessex Studios drum riser and clapping many times, then adding delay effects to make it sound like many people were participating. The delay durations were in the ratios of prime numbers, a technique now known as non-harmonic reverberation. The guitar solo on the recording ends with a phrase repeated three times; this is a tape loop, rather than Brian May playing the phrase multiple times.

The "stomp, stomp, clap" sounds were later used in the Queen + Paul Rodgers song "Still Burnin'".

When performed live, the song is usually followed by "We Are the Champions", as they were designed to run together. The songs are often paired on the radio and at sporting events, where they are frequently played. They were the last two songs Queen performed at Live Aid in 1985.

== Fast version ==
=== Studio version ===
Queen also arranged an alternative version of "We Will Rock You" known as the "fast version", featuring a faster-feeling tempo and a full band arrangement. The studio version was made for John Peel's BBC Radio 1 show at the Maida Vale Studios on 28 October 1977 and first broadcast soon after on 14 November. It includes a separate section that begins with an abridged session version of the original comprising the first verse, chorus and guitar outro - this part has become known as "We Will Rock You (slow)". Between the two parts there is a brief reading of Hermann Hesse's novel Siddhartha, taken from a BBC Radio documentary. This audio was found on the BBC tapes being reused to record the session and was retained by the band.

This full BBC session version of "We Will Rock You" was broadcast on Alan Freeman's Final Saturday Rock Show on Radio 1 on 26 August 1978, has also been played on Radio 1's Friday Rock Show and more recently on Johnie Walker's Sounds Of The Seventies and Vernon Kay's weekday morning show, both on BBC Radio 2.

The fast version is also used as the curtain call music for the musical of the same title, after the finale, which is a pairing of the original "We Will Rock You" and "We Are the Champions". In 2002, the fast version was officially released on a promo single distributed by the tabloid The Sun, and can also be found on The Best of King Biscuit Live Volume 4, and In The Mirror - The Lost BBC Sessions.

=== Live version ===
"We Will Rock You (Live at Lyon, 17 Feb '79)"

Single by Queen

from the album Live Killers
- B-side: "Let Me Entertain You" (Live)
- Released: 24 August 1979
- Recorded: 17 February 1979
- Venue: Palais des Sports de Gerland, Lyon
- Genre: Rock
- Length: 3:18
- Label: Elektra
- Songwriter: Brian May
- Producer: Queen

Queen US singles chronology
"Jealousy" (1979)	"We Will Rock You (Live at Lyon, 17 Feb '79)" (1979)	"Crazy Little Thing Called Love" (1979)

Queen performed this alternate version of "We Will Rock You" frequently at concerts spanning from the News of the World Tour in 1977 until the Hot Space Tour in 1982. They would use it to open their live sets, as heard on the albums Live Killers (1979), Queen on Fire - Live at the Bowl (2004), Queen Rock Montreal (2007), and the expanded edition of News of the World (2011). The Live Killers version was released as a single in the US and Japan in August 1979.

== Music video ==
The music video for "We Will Rock You" was filmed in 1978 at the back garden of Roger Taylor's mansion. It sees the band lip synching the song, hand clapping with gloves and foot stomping on a frozen ground. In an interview with Billboard, Taylor spoke on filming the video:

We shot it on the grounds of a country house I'd just bought in Surrey and we hadn't completed the sale, so we weren't allowed in the house. We figured, 'we might as well shoot it here.' It was absolutely freezing cold and we did three takes.

== Personnel ==
Information is based on the album's liner notes

- Freddie Mercury – lead and backing vocals, hand claps, foot stamping
- Brian May – guitars, backing vocals, hand claps, foot stamping
- Roger Taylor – backing vocals, hand claps, foot stamping
- John Deacon – hand claps, foot stamping
- Elizabeth Edwards – backing vocals, hand claps, foot stamping
- Andrew Turner – backing vocals, hand claps, foot stamping

== Chart performance ==
=== Weekly charts ===
Year	Chart	Peak position
1977	Belgium (Ultratop 50 Wallonia)	8
1978	France (IFOP)	1
1992	Australia (ARIA) with "We Are the Champions"	81
1992	Belgium (Ultratop 50 Flanders)	45
1992	Netherlands (Dutch Top 40)	12
1992	US Billboard Hot 100	52
2003	France (SNEP)	10
2003	Germany (GfK)	69
2003	Netherlands (Single Top 100)	9
2003	Switzerland (Schweizer Hitparade)	49
2006	US Billboard Hot Digital Songs	36
2008	Canada (Hot Canadian Digital Singles)	56
2011	Spain (Promusicae)	18
2012	Japan Hot 100 Singles	95
2017	Poland Airplay (ZPAV)	69
2018	Canada (Hot Canadian Digital Songs)	13
2018	Italy (FIMI)	75
2018	Portugal (AFP)	100
2018	Sweden Heatseeker (Sverigetopplistan)	15
2018	Japan Hot 100 (Billboard)	34
2019	US Hot Rock & Alternative Songs (Billboard)	6
2024	Poland (Polish Airplay Top 100)	51

=== Year-end charts ===
Chart (1978)	Position
Australia (Kent Music Report) (Double-A sided single with "We Are the Champions")	57

Chart (2018)	Position
US Hot Rock Songs (Billboard)	68

Chart (2019)	Position
US Hot Rock Songs (Billboard)	22

== Certifications ==
Certifications for "We Will Rock You"
Region	Certification	Certified units/sales
Brazil (Pro-Música Brasil)	Platinum	60,000^{‡}
Denmark (IFPI Danmark)	Platinum	90,000^{‡}
France (SNEP) We Will Rock You / We Are The Champions	Gold	500,000^{*}
Germany (BVMI)	Platinum	500,000^{‡}
Italy (FIMI)	2× Platinum	100,000^{‡}
Japan (RIAJ) Digital single	Gold	100,000^{*}
Japan (RIAJ) Ringtone	2× Platinum	500,000^{*}
New Zealand (RMNZ)	5× Platinum	150,000^{‡}
Spain (Promusicae)	2× Platinum	120,000^{‡}
United Kingdom (BPI) Sales + streams since 2011	3× Platinum	1,800,000^{‡}
United States (RIAA)	9× Platinum	9,000,000^{‡}
^{*} Sales figures based on certification alone.^{‡} Sales+streaming figures based on certification alone.

== Notable cover versions ==
=== Five + Queen version ===
"We Will Rock You"

Single by Five + Queen

from the album Invincible
- B-side: "Megamix"; "Keep On Movin'" (The Five-A-Side Mix)
- Released: 17 July 2000
- Length: 3:08 (US); 2:57 (UK)
- Label: RCA; BMG
- Songwriters: Brian May; Richard "Abs" Breen; Jason "J" Brown
- Producers: Richard Stannard; Julian Gallagher

Five singles chronology
"Don't Wanna Let You Go" (2000)	"We Will Rock You" (2000)	"Let's Dance" (2001)

Queen singles chronology
"Under Pressure (Rah Mix)" (1999)	"We Will Rock You" (2000)	"Flash (Vanguard Mix)" (2003)

Music video
- "We Will Rock You" on YouTube

British boy band Five released a cover of "We Will Rock You" on 17 July 2000. It was the fourth single released from their second studio album, Invincible (1999). The song contains rap verses from Five's members Jason "J" Brown and Richard "Abs" Breen, and features two members of Queen: Brian May on guitar and Roger Taylor on drums (only on the single version); however, they do not sing any vocals on the track. Freddie Mercury had died in November 1991, nearly a decade before this version's release, and John Deacon had retired from public life three years before the release of the Five cover.

The song charted at number one on the UK Singles Chart, making it Five's second number-one single, and their ninth consecutive top-ten hit.

==== Track listings ====
"Megamix" consists of four songs by Five: "Don't Wanna Let You Go", "If Ya Gettin' Down", "Keep On Movin'", and "We Will Rock You".

UK CD1

1. "We Will Rock You" (radio edit) – 3:08
2. "Keep On Movin'" (The Five-A-Side Mix) – 3:32
3. "We Will Rock You" (UK version) – 2:57
4. "We Will Rock You" (video—enhanced track)

UK CD2

1. "We Will Rock You" (radio edit) – 3:08
2. "We Will Rock You" (UK version) – 2:57
3. "Megamix" – 4:19
4. "Megamix" video (enhanced track)

UK cassette single

1. "We Will Rock You" (radio edit) – 3:08
2. "We Will Rock You" (UK version) – 2:57
3. "Keep On Movin'" (The Five-A-Side Mix) – 3:32
4. "Megamix" – 4:19

European CD single

1. "We Will Rock You" (radio edit) – 3:08
2. "We Will Rock You" (UK version) – 2:57
3. "Megamix" – 4:19

Australian CD single

1. "We Will Rock You" (radio edit) – 3:08
2. "We Will Rock You" (UK version) – 2:57
3. "Megamix" – 4:19
4. "Keep On Movin'" (The Five-A-Side Mix) – 3:32
5. "We Will Rock You" (video—enhanced track)

==== Charts ====
===== Weekly charts =====
Chart (2000)	Peak position
Australia (ARIA)	3
Austria (Ö3 Austria Top 40)	2
Belgium (Ultratop 50 Flanders)	17
Belgium (Ultratip Bubbling Under Wallonia)	4
Czech Republic (IFPI)	33
El Salvador (El Siglo de Torreón)	1
Europe (Eurochart Hot 100)	11
Germany (GfK)	8
Guatemala (El Siglo de Torreón)	10
Iceland (Tonlist)	10
Ireland (IRMA)	6
Italy (FIMI)	35
Italy (Musica e dischi)	31
Latvia (Latvijas Top 30)	9
Netherlands (Dutch Top 40)	20
Netherlands (Single Top 100)	15
New Zealand (Recorded Music NZ)	29
Poland Airplay (Music & Media)	5
Scottish Singles Sales (Official Charts)	2
Sweden (Sverigetopplistan)	35
Switzerland (Schweizer Hitparade)	18
UK Singles (Official Charts)	1
UK Airplay (Music Week)	16

===== Year-end charts =====
Chart (2000)	Position
Australia (ARIA)	34
Austria (Ö3 Austria Top 40)	20
Belgium (Ultratop 50 Flanders)	81
Europe (Eurochart Hot 100)	65
Germany (Media Control)	58
Ireland (IRMA)	54
Latvia (Latvijas Top 50)	49
Switzerland (Schweizer Hitparade)	70
UK Singles (OCC)	45

==== Certifications ====
Region	Certification	Certified units/sales
Australia (ARIA)	Platinum	70,000^{^}
United Kingdom (BPI)	Silver	200,000^{^}
^{^} Shipments figures based on certification alone.

=== KCPK version ===
A remix by KCPK, sung by a chorus of children under the name Forever Young, was released in a series of animated Evian adverts which aired in France, Germany and Belgium. The remix was later released as a single and entered the local charts.

==== Chart performance ====
Chart (2003)	Peak position
Austria (Ö3 Austria Top 40)	50
Belgium (Ultratip Bubbling Under Flanders)	3
Belgium (Ultratop 50 Wallonia)	10
Europe (Eurochart Hot 100)	10
France (SNEP)	2
Germany (GfK)	18
Switzerland (Schweizer Hitparade)	16

==== Year-end charts ====
Chart (2003)	Position
Belgium (Ultratop 50 Wallonia)	36
France (SNEP)	10
Romania (Romania Top 100)	66
Switzerland (Schweizer Hitparade)	57

=== Megan Thee Stallion version ===
"We Will Rock You (Megan Thee Stallion)"

Promotional single by Megan Thee Stallion and Queen
- Released: 5 September 2024
- Length: 1:44
- Label: Queen Productions Ltd.
- Songwriters: Brian May; Megan Jovon Ruth Pete
- Producers: Bankroll Got It; Queen

Megan Thee Stallion promotional singles chronology
"Pussy Don't Lie" (2023)	"We Will Rock You (Megan Thee Stallion)" (2024)	"Tina Tuesday Freestyle" (2026)

Alternative current cover

Audio video
- "We Will Rock You (Megan Thee Stallion)" on YouTube

American rapper Megan Thee Stallion covered "We Will Rock You" in a September 2024 Pepsi television advertisement. On 5 September 2024, the song, sampling the original chorus, was released as a single; Queen are credited as co-lead artists.

=== Other versions ===
- 1992: American glam metal band Warrant covered the song for the film Gladiator. The song charted at number 83 on the Billboard Hot 100.
- 2004: American pop singers Britney Spears, Beyoncé and Pink used this song in an international commercial Pepsi campaign along with Spanish singer-songwriter Enrique Iglesias, and the song was released on the Pepsi Music 2004: (Dare for More) CD.
- 2007 on Nickelodeon's hit kid's TV show Drake & Josh in the episode "The Storm" where Drake and his band were supposed to perform at the arena downtown San Diego but a big storm ruined the show.
- 2021: British rock band The Struts, whose lead singer Luke Spiller is strongly influenced by Mercury, recorded their version of the song as non-album single.
- 2025: American rapper Pitbull and producer RedOne made a remake for the 2025 FIFA Club World Cup.

== Sampling ==
- 1992: American rapper Ice Cube sampled the beat in his song "When Will They Shoot?", from his album The Predator.
- 2002: American rapper Eminem interpolated the "stomp-stomp-clap" beat in his song "'Till I Collapse" from his album The Eminem Show and also used a similar pattern in the songs "Puke" from his album Encore and "Cinderella Man" from his album Recovery.
- 2003: The J-Kwon song "Tipsy" directly samples the "We Will Rock You" beat, but reworked into a different beat.
- 2005: The Young Jeezy song "And Then What" released in mid-2005 as the first single from his debut album Let's Get It: Thug Motivation 101 samples the beat, changing the "stomp-stomp-clap" beat in the hook to "boom-boom-clap."
- 2011: American pop singer Katy Perry interpolated the "stomp-stomp-clap" beat in her song "E.T".
- 2011: Beyoncé interpolated the "stomp-stomp-clap" beat in her song "Dreaming", featured on the Japanese edition of her 4th album 4.
- 2011: Lady Gaga sampled the "stomp-stomp-clap" in her song "You and I", which also features the band's guitarist Brian May, from Gaga's album Born This Way.
- 2012: One Direction interpolated the "stomp-stomp-clap" and references "Rock" in their song "Rock Me" featured on their second album Take Me Home.
- 2012: Kesha interpolated the "stomp-stomp-clap" in her song "Gold Trans Am", featured on the deluxe edition of her second album, Warrior.

== Live cover performances ==
1990s

- 1992: Guns N' Roses lead singer Axl Rose performed the song with Queen at the Freddie Mercury Tribute Concert.
- 1992: U2 used the song as a set list opener before they performed on stage during the Zoo TV Tour.
- 1993: Nirvana performed it in São Paulo, Brazil, changing the lyrics to "we will fuck you".
- 1996: Alanis Morissette and her band ended the first encore of her "Can't Not" Tour (following the song, "You Learn") with a cover of the song, with Alanis playing the "stomp-stomp-clap" rhythm on drums.

2000s

- 2003: English singer and songwriter Robbie Williams performed the song live at Knebworth.
- 2007, 2010: Japanese pop singer Kumi Koda covered this in her a-nation '07 performance, and three years later in a medley at her 10th anniversary concert at the Tokyo Dome.
- 2008: Canadian singer Celine Dion performed a Queen medley with "We Will Rock You" and "The Show Must Go On" in her Taking Chances World Tour.
- 2009: American guitarist Joe Perry from Aerosmith and singer Katy Perry covered the song at the MTV's Video Music Awards 2009.

2010s

- 2011: American rock band My Chemical Romance performed the song with Queen guitarist Brian May at the Reading Festival.
- 2011: Christina Aguilera, CeeLo Green, Adam Levine and Blake Shelton covered the song on The Voice (U.S.).
- 2012: English pop singer Jessie J performed the song live with Brian May and Roger Taylor at the closing ceremony of the 2012 Summer Olympics in London on 12 August.
- 2012: English rapper Dappy covered the song live alongside Brian May for BBC Radio 1 Live Lounge. The song later appeared on UK chart-topping album BBC Radio 1's Live Lounge 2012.

2020s

- In a pre-recorded comedy segment at the opening of the Platinum Party at the Palace on 4 June 2022, Queen Elizabeth II and Paddington Bear tapped their tea cups to the beat of "We Will Rock You" before Queen + Adam Lambert performed the song live outside Buckingham Palace.

== Remixes ==
- 1991: Rick Rubin produced remixes of "We Will Rock You", for an EP released by Hollywood Records. The "Ruined Remix" also contains contributions by Flea and Chad Smith of the Red Hot Chili Peppers.
- 1991: Emergency Broadcast Network achieved an underground hit with their remix of the song with a speech by U.S. president George H. W. Bush.
- 2004: Scum Of The Earth made a remix of "We Will Rock You" titled as "Pornstar Champion" for their debut album, Blah...Blah...Blah...Love Songs for the New Millennium
- 2011: Geddy (a.k.a. Armageddon), former member from hip hop group Terror Squad, mashed up "I Want It All" and "We Will Rock You" for the soundtrack to the 2011 film Sucker Punch.
- 2012 : Helmut VonLichten (formerly of E.S. Posthumus) mixed this song with an orchestral version of "Posthumus Zone" for CBS's Super Bowl 50 coverage. This mashup was later used for the 2015 film Pixels.
- 2014 : Canadian dubstep producer Excision and downlink remixed this song in the track Rock You.

== Parodies and references to the song ==
- 1987: Henry Rollins did a parody of "We Will Rock You" titled "I Have Come to Kill You".
- 1998: Friends episode "The One Where Ross Moves In" - [S05E07]: Ross moves into Joey and Chandler's apartment. As time goes by, Ross reveals he's quite annoying by imposing a lot of changes to the norm of the apartment. One being the changing of the answering machine message to the tune of "We Will Rock You" by Queen, to which Ross alters the lyrics to "We Will, We Will Call You Back!".
- 2000: In The 10th Kingdom the parody are WE WILL SHEAR YOU.
- 2010: The cast of the Off-Broadway musical Avenue Q performed covers of "We Will Rock You" and "We Are the Champions" in a video spoof of the Muppets' "Bohemian Rhapsody".
- 2012: In the 12 March edition of WWE Raw, The Rock performed his version during the Rock Concert segment by adding references to Team Bring It and fans chanting "Cena Sucks" in the chorus while taking aim at John Cena before they square off at WrestleMania XXVIII.
- 2014: Indonesian singer Ahmad Dhani made a controversial political campaign video with a parody of the song to support presidential candidate Prabowo Subianto for the 2014 Indonesian presidential election. Dhani wore Heinrich Himmler's SS Uniform in the video.
- 2015: In The Big Bang Theory episode "The Bachelor Party Corrosion" Raj, Howard and Leonard sing a modified version of the song called, "We Will Percussive Shock You" and Sheldon burst out singing the first verse of the original song, which he then credited to his eidetic memory, mentioned that in this instance it was a 'curse.'
- 2023: The intro from "We Will Rock You" was the first music transmitted from lucid dreams into reality in real-time. The study was published in Dreaming, an American Psychological Association peer-reviewed journal.

== See also ==
- List of best-selling singles
- List of number-one singles of 1978 (France)
- List of UK Singles Chart number ones of the 2000s
