= Captain Hook (Megan Thee Stallion song) =

2020 single by Megan Thee Stallion

Single by Megan Thee Stallion

from the EP Suga
- Released: March 10, 2020
- Recorded: 2019
- Genre: Hip hop
- Length: 2:56
- Label: 1501 Certified; 300
- Composer: Julian Mason
- Lyricist: Megan Pete
- Producer: LilJuMadeDaBeat

Megan Thee Stallion singles chronology
"B.I.T.C.H." (2020)	"Captain Hook" (2020)	"Freak" (2020)

Music video
- "Captain Hook" on YouTube

"Captain Hook" is a song by American rapper Megan Thee Stallion from her third EP Suga (2020). It was released as the second single from the EP on March 10, 2020, alongside a music video. Following its release, a TikTok dance choreographed by TikTok star Skaibeauty quickly went viral.

== Music video ==
The music video was directed by Megan Thee Stallion herself. It opens with her at a studio writing the song's lyrics on her notepad, before going to the booth to rap them. While performing, she twerks and dances and a party starts, involving gambling and a lot of alcohol drinking. Rapper Yella Beezy makes a cameo in the video.

== Charts ==
Chart (2020)	Peak position
New Zealand Hot Singles (RMNZ)	26
US Billboard Hot 100	74
US Hot R&B/Hip-Hop Songs (Billboard)	41

== Certifications ==
Region	Certification	Certified units/sales
New Zealand (RMNZ)	Gold	15,000^{‡}
United States (RIAA)	2× Platinum	2,000,000^{‡}
^{‡} Sales+streaming figures based on certification alone.
