= Plan B (song) =

2022 single by Megan Thee Stallion

Single by Megan Thee Stallion

from the album Traumazine
- Released: April 22, 2022
- Recorded: 2021
- Genre: Hip hop
- Length: 2:43
- Label: 1501 Certified; 300
- Composers: Omar Perrin; Robert Watson; Dalvin Degrate; Donald Degrate
- Lyricist: Megan Pete
- Producers: Hitmaka; Omar Grand; Rob Holladay

Megan Thee Stallion singles chronology
"Sweetest Pie" (2022)	"Plan B" (2022)	"Pressurelicious" (2022)

Music video
- "Plan B" on YouTube

"Plan B" is a song by American rapper-songwriter Megan Thee Stallion. She previewed the song during her performance at the Coachella Valley Music and Arts Festival; it was then released a week later on April 22, 2022. It serves as the second single from her second studio album Traumazine.

== Background and composition ==
A week before Coachella, Megan Thee Stallion announced the song in a Twitter post: "I got this song that I recorded and every time I play it for a woman they start jumping and clapping. I think I wanna perform it at Coachella for the first time before I actually drop it." Soon after, she shared a clip of her rapping the song on Twitter. While onstage at Coachella, Megan said the song was "very motherfucking personal to her" and is "to whom the fuck it may concern". The song was also rumored to be titled "Letter to My Ex", but Megan clarified it was not in a Tweet.

"Plan B" sees Megan Thee Stallion rapping over a beat sampling the "Freek'n You" remix by Jodeci featuring Wu-Tang Clan. She bitterly addresses those whom she has been in relationships with: "Still can't believe I used to fuck with ya / Poppin' Plan Bs 'cause I ain't planned to be stuck with ya". Plan B being in reference to levonorgestrel, which prevents pregnancy in emergencies. In the "aggressive, hard-hitting" track, she references infidelity and tells women to love themselves, also delivering boastful lyrics showing her sexual confidence.

Many believed the song was directed toward Canadian rapper Tory Lanez, who shot Megan Thee Stallion in 2020. However, Megan confirmed on Twitter that the song referred to her past relationships instead of a single person in particular.

== Charts ==
=== Weekly charts ===
Weekly chart performance for "Plan B"
Chart (2022)	Peak position
Canada Hot 100 (Billboard)	66
Global 200 (Billboard)	51
New Zealand Hot Singles (RMNZ)	3
US Billboard Hot 100	29
US Hot R&B/Hip-Hop Songs (Billboard)	7
US R&B/Hip-Hop Airplay (Billboard)	16
US Rhythmic Airplay (Billboard)	10

=== Year-end charts ===
2022 year-end chart performance for "Plan B"
Chart (2022)	Position
US Hot R&B/Hip-Hop Songs (Billboard)	59

== Certifications ==
Certifications for "Plan B"
Region	Certification	Certified units/sales
New Zealand (RMNZ)	Gold	15,000^{‡}
United States (RIAA)	Platinum	1,000,000^{‡}
^{‡} Sales+streaming figures based on certification alone.

== Release history ==
Release history for "Plan B"
Region	Date	Format	Label	Ref.
Various	April 22, 2022	Digital download; streaming	1501 Certified; 300	
United States	May 3, 2022	Rhythmic radio	1501 Certified; 300	
