= Suga (EP) =

2020 EP by Megan Thee Stallion

EP by Megan Thee Stallion
- Released: March 6, 2020
- Recorded: 2019
- Genre: Hip-hop
- Length: 24:33
- Labels: 1501 Certified; 300
- Producers: Helluva; J. Tabb; J. White Did It; Jake One; LilJuMadeDaBeat; Pop Wansel; Swish; The Neptunes; Timbaland; Tommy Brown

Megan Thee Stallion chronology
Fever (2019)	Suga (2020)	Good News (2020)

Singles from Suga
- 1. "B.I.T.C.H." Released: January 24, 2020; 2. "Captain Hook" Released: March 10, 2020; 3. "Savage" Released: April 7, 2020

Suga is the third extended play by American rapper-songwriter Megan Thee Stallion. It was released on March 6, 2020, by 1501 Certified Entertainment and 300 Entertainment. It features guest appearances from Kehlani and Gunna. The project's release was preceded by legal troubles between the rapper and the label, following a contract renegotiation attempt, which led to the filing of a temporary restraining order towards the label. Megan had initially intended for it to be her debut studio album, but instead released it as an EP as a result.

The EP features the single "B.I.T.C.H.", released on January 24, 2020, that charted at number 31 on the Billboard Hot 100. The album's second single, "Captain Hook", was released on March 10, 2020, and charted at number 74 in the US. The third and final single "Savage", was sent to top 40 radio formats on April 7, 2020, and has since become Megan Thee Stallion's first chart-topper in the United States, aided by a Beyoncé remix.

== Background ==
Following the success of Megan's debut mixtape, Fever, and the Platinum-certified songs "Hot Girl Summer" featuring Nicki Minaj and Ty Dolla Sign and "Cash Shit" featuring DaBaby, in 2019, after her NPR Tiny Desk Concert, Megan revealed her debut studio album was in the works and set for release in 2020. She also revealed the album would introduce a new alter-ego named Suga, who is "besties" with her Tina Snow alter-ego.

The lead single, "B.I.T.C.H." was released on January 24, 2020. The song was met with positive reviews and it charted at number 31 on the Billboard Hot 100. Megan performed the song on The Tonight Show Starring Jimmy Fallon to promote it.

Following the single's release, Megan revealed more details of the EP, in an interview on Zane Lowe's Beats 1 show. She revealed the EP would be titled Suga, and that it would feature collaborations with Kehlani and SZA, and production credits by Juicy J and Pharrell Williams.

In February 2020, Megan covered Rolling Stone, along with Normani and SZA, and revealed in an interview she was eyeing the release of the project to May (the month of her mother, Holly Thomas', birthday. Both Megan's mother and grandmother died in March 2019).

In the beginning of March, Megan and her Roc Nation management filed a lawsuit and temporary restraining order towards her label, 1501 Certified Entertainment, claiming the label signed her to an unfair contract and refused to renegotiate. The label would take "the vast majority" of her earnings (60% from her recording income, 30% from touring, 30% from merchandising). Following the renegotiation attempts, the label forbid her from releasing new music, which led to the lawsuit and the judge siding with Megan and Roc Nation, allowing her to release a project on March 6, 2020.

Megan announced the release and tracklist of her new project, Suga, on her social media on March 4, 2020, two days prior to its release. The set was believed to be her debut studio album, as previewed, but in a change of plans, Megan confirmed in an interview on Ebro in the Morning, that it was just an EP with "the songs that I really, really liked", affirming that her debut studio album is still under production. Eight months later, her debut studio album Good News was released on November 20, 2020.

== Singles and promotion ==
The EP's lead single, "B.I.T.C.H.", was released on January 24, 2020. It is described as a song where Megan "confronts an inept boyfriend who's ignoring her feelings" and received praise from Pitchfork due to the fact that "her trademark confidence complements the slinky retro beat". The song samples Bootsy's Rubber Band' "I'd Rather Be With You" (1976) and Tupac Shakur's "Ratha Be Ya Nigga" (1996). The song debuted and peaked at number 31 on the Billboard Hot 100 and at number 9 on the Rolling Stone 100, with 12.5 million streams on its first tracking week. The single was promoted with a performance on The Tonight Show Starring Jimmy Fallon, where Megan sings and raps, dressed in a red belted body suit, alongside two backup dancers on a fog-filled stage. An accompanying video for the song was released on March 6, 2020, along with the EP's release. The music video, directed by Eif Rivera, introduces the alter-ego Suga, who rides in a Rolls-Royce with Tina Snow (Megan's other alter-ego), walks her dogs in a leopard suit and twerks in a Jacuzzi.

"Captain Hook" was released on March 10, 2020, alongside a music video as the EP's second single. Megan started a dance challenge to promote the song prior to the video's release. The song debuted and peaked at number 74 on the Billboard Hot 100.

The song "Savage" went viral on the app TikTok due to users starting a dance challenge to the song. At the recommendation of the head of music partnerships at TikTok, the record label shifted focus from "Captain Hook" to "Savage" and the song was later released as the EP's third single.

== Critical reception ==
Professional ratings
Aggregate scores
Source	Rating
AnyDecentMusic?	7.2/10
Metacritic	77/100
Review scores
Source	Rating
AllMusic	3.5/5 stars
Consequence of Sound	B
Exclaim!	7/10
HipHopDX	2.9/5
The Line of Best Fit	9/10
MusicOMH	4/5 stars
Pitchfork	7/10
Rolling Stone	4/5 stars
Tom Hull – on the Web	A−

According to the review aggregator Metacritic, Suga (EP) received "generally favorable reviews" based on a weighted average score of 77 out of 100 from 9 critic scores. Aggregator AnyDecentMusic? gave it 7.2 out of 10, based on their assessment of the critical consensus.

Variety wrote that Megan "is mixing the cold hard steel of hip-hop power, with the teasing romanticism of mod R&B — and it looks great on her." The Line of Best Fit rated the set 9 out of 10 and praised the "nostalgia, melancholy and faith, counterbalancing Megan's overall ethos of optimistic self-empowerment". Pitchfork scored the EP 7 out of 10, with Mankaprr Conteh saying that "Megan occasionally struggles to package new truths about her social status in the whip-smart ways she did her old ones", but "at only 24 minutes long, Suga avoids the bloating that plagued Fever, and a good-not-great song like "Rich" is over too quickly to complain much". Conteh concluded, "Suga may not be remembered as a keystone in Megan Thee Stallion's catalog, but it's a fine portrait of an artist embracing her full self as her world changes drastically." Rolling Stone gave the EP 4 out of 5 stars, and stated "On Suga she sounds warm and vulnerable, unsure how to carry on without her mama to guide her, but determined to do her proud. And she makes herself clear: she's no one's property." Vulture also praised the "sex-positive bangers that tap into the same vein of Megan highlights" but wrote that "ending the project weaker than it started makes Suga feel like a half-step toward the evolution Megan had planned".

Concluding the review for AllMusic, Fred Thomas stated that "Suga finds Megan Thee Stallion experiencing the growing pains of success. The songs reflect this in their lyrical content, overall shift in tonality, and even in the small steps they take towards more commercial sounds."

In June 2020, the album was included on Billboard and Complex's lists of the best albums of 2020 "so far", ranking at number 41 on the latter list.

== Commercial performance ==
Suga debuted at number 10 on the US Billboard 200 with 41,000 album-equivalent units, becoming Megan Thee Stallion's second US top-10 album. Of that sum, 36,000 came from streaming-equivalent units, and 5,000 from pure sales. Later, due to the success of "Savage" and the remix with Beyoncé, the album reached a new peak of number seven, with 39,000 units moved for the chart dated May 16, 2020.

== Track listing ==
Standard edition
No.	Title	Writer(s)	Producer(s)	Length
1.	"Ain't Equal"	Megan Pete; Martin McCurtis	Helluva	2:24
2.	"Savage"	Pete; Anthony White; Bobby Session Jr.	J. White Did It	2:35
3.	"Captain Hook"	Pete; Julian Mason	LilJuMadeDaBeat	2:56
4.	"Hit My Phone" (featuring Kehlani)	Pete; Kehlani Parrish; Nija Charles; Jacob Dutton; Andrew Wansel; Sam Wishkoski; Travis Simmons	Jake One; Pop Wansel; Sam Wish; Charles^{[v]}	2:30
5.	"B.I.T.C.H."	Pete; McCurtis; Gary Cooper; George Clinton Jr.; William Collins; Tupac Shakur; Douglass Rasheed	Helluva	3:03
6.	"Rich"	Pete; Tommy Brown	TBHitz; Xavi; Frank King; Payday	1:35
7.	"Stop Playing" (featuring Gunna)	Pete; Chad Hugo; Pharrell Williams; Sergio Kitchens	The Neptunes	2:54
8.	"Crying in the Car"	Pete; Hugo; Williams; Jack Hawitt; Lewis Gardiner; Benjamin Roustaing; Robin Stjernberg	The Neptunes	3:12
9.	"What I Need"	Pete; Timothy Mosley	Timbaland; J Tabb	3:20
Total length:				24:33

ChopNotSlop Remix
No.	Title	Length
1.	"Suga" (Intro)	1:33
2.	"Savage"	3:40
3.	"B.I.T.C.H."	5:00
4.	"Captain Hook"	3:14
5.	"What I Need"	4:15
6.	"Interlude"	0:34
7.	"Stop Playing" (featuring Gunna)	3:40
8.	"Crying in the Car"	3:00
9.	"Rich"	2:28
10.	"Hit My Phone" (featuring Kehlani)	2:48
11.	"Ain't Equal"	2:38
Total length:		32:55

Notes

- ^{^[v]} signifies a vocal producer.
- All tracks on Suga (ChopNotSlop Remix) are subtitled "ChopNotSlop remix" and credited to Megan Thee Stallion and OG Ron C.

Sample credits

- "B.I.T.C.H." incorporates lyrics from "Ratha Be Ya Nigga" (1996) performed by Tupac Shakur, written by Tupac Shakur and Douglass Rasheed.

== Charts ==
=== Weekly charts ===
Chart performance for Suga
Chart (2020)	Peak position
Canadian Albums (Billboard)	17
Dutch Albums (Album Top 100)	56
Estonian Albums (Eesti Tipp-40)	37
French Albums (SNEP)	149
US Billboard 200	7
US Top R&B/Hip-Hop Albums (Billboard)	6

=== Year-end charts ===
2020 year-end chart performance for Suga
Chart (2020)	Position
US Billboard 200	58
US Top R&B/Hip-Hop Albums (Billboard)	38

== Certifications ==
Region	Certification	Certified units/sales
New Zealand (RMNZ)	Gold	7,500^{‡}
United States (RIAA)	Gold	500,000^{‡}
^{‡} Sales+streaming figures based on certification alone.
