= Traumazine =

Studio album by Megan Thee Stallion
- Released: August 12, 2022
- Genre: Hip-hop
- Length: 51:05
- Label: 1501 Certified; 300
- Producer: Avedon; Babie; Bankroll Got It; Bandplay; BongoByTheWay; CashMoneyAP; D-Sims; Diego Ave; Go Grizzly; Hitkidd; FranchiseDidIt; KTOE; LilJuMadeDaBeat; J. White Did It; Juicy J; Mr. Lee; Murda Beatz; OG Parker; Omar Grand; Romano; P.Raw; Payday; Platinum Library; Rob Holladay; Source; SSV; Taz Taylor; Vaugh Oliver; YoungKio

Megan Thee Stallion chronology
Something for Thee Hotties (2021)	Traumazine (2022)	Megan (2024)

Singles from Traumazine
- 1. "Sweetest Pie" Released: March 11, 2022; 2. "Plan B" Released: April 22, 2022; 3. "Pressurelicious" Released: July 21, 2022; 4. "Her" Released: August 15, 2022

Traumazine is the second studio album by American rapper-songwriter Megan Thee Stallion, released on August 12, 2022. This was her final work with 300 Entertainment and 1501 Certified Entertainment.

Upon release, Traumazine received positive reviews from critics, who complimented its production and Megan's flow. It was nominated for the BET Hip Hop Award for Album of the Year. The album's lead single, "Sweetest Pie" with English singer Dua Lipa, peaked at number 15 on the US Billboard Hot 100 and has been certified platinum by the Recording Industry Association of America (RIAA).

Commercially, the album debuted at number four on the US Billboard 200, becoming Megan Thee Stallion's fifth US top 10 album. It did not achieve high placements in international charts, sparking a lawsuit by the rapper who accused the label of insufficient promotion. The album was later certified Gold by the RIAA for selling over 500,000 units.

== Background and label lawsuit ==
In 2020, Megan Thee Stallion filed suit against her record label 1501 Certified Entertainment to renegotiate her contract, after her management company Roc Nation found it "iffy". When Something for Thee Hotties was released the record label didn't recognize it as an album, because it has 29 minutes of new material instead of 45, so the rapper would have to release two more albums in addition to Something. On February 18, 2022, Megan filed suit against the label claiming that Something respects the definition of an album with at least 45 minutes of material.

On August 11, 2022, Megan took to Twitter to announce that her second studio album Traumazine would be released the next day. The rapper also wrote about the lawsuit, expressing her disappointment and emotional distress at the difficulty she is experiencing in releasing her music, but ending her message to fans with the phrase "we almost out". Megan defined the album title as referring to a chemical released in the brain when forced to deal with "painful emotions caused by traumatic events and experiences. See synonyms: self-realization".

After the low promotion of Traumazine by the label, Thee Stallion had started a second lawsuit, accusing the company of contributing to the album's poor sales and marketing. On October 19, 2023, lawyers from 1501 Certified Entertainment confirmed that they and Thee Stallion had reached a confidential agreement to resolve their legal differences by parting amicably.

== Composition ==
Lyrically, Traumazine contains themes related to self-expression, the empowerment of African-American women, death, and overcoming difficult moments in life. In an interview with Ebro Darden and Nadeska Alexis of Apple Music, the rapper discussed the meaning of the record project:

Usually when I write songs […] I could be sad. […] I don't write songs about how I feel, I write songs about how I want to feel. So I feel like, on this album, it's probably the first time I figured out how to talk about what I want to say… express myself a little bit more. So that's just how I've been living life. And I feel like it's been so easy for people to tell my story for me, speak on my behalf because I'm a nonchalant person, I feel like. […] But like I see now that it can get out of control so I feel like I wanted to just take control of my narrative, take control of my own story. Tell it my way, tell it from me.

The album featured several collaborations from Dua Lipa, Future, and Key Glock, and additional guest appearances from Latto, Pooh Shiesty, Rico Nasty, Jhené Aiko, Lucky Daye, Sauce Walka, Lil' Keke, and Big Pokey.

== Promotion ==
The first single was "Sweetest Pie", with English singer Dua Lipa, released on March 11, 2022. The second single was "Plan B", released on April 22, 2022. It was followed by the collaboration "Pressurelicious" with Future, released on July 21, 2022, and "Her", released three days after the release of the album. A music video for "Ungrateful" featuring American rapper Key Glock was released on September 6, 2022.

== Critical reception ==
Professional ratings
Aggregate scores
Source	Rating
AnyDecentMusic?	7.5/10
Metacritic	80/100
Review scores
Source	Rating
AllMusic	3.5/5 stars
Clash	8/10
The Guardian	4/5 stars
HipHopDX	3.5/5
MusicOMH	4/5 stars
NME	4/5 stars
Pitchfork	7.1/10
Rolling Stone	4/5 stars
Slant Magazine	3.5/5 stars
The Telegraph	4/5 stars

According to the review aggregator Metacritic, Traumazine received "generally favorable reviews" based on a weighted average score of 80 out of 100 from 12 critic scores.

Time journalist Moises Mendez II wrote that the rapper "alternates between knocking down every obstacle that stands in her way and realizing that some obstacles will take longer to get past than others", adding "with Traumazine, we see her dig deeper into her insecurities", citing the "most gut-wrenching lines in the album", referring to her parents' death. Mendez additionally noted the "dark and ominous" production tone, with lyrical references to the difficult rise for an African American woman in the music industry and the legal battle to dissolve her 1501 Certified record contract.

NPR editor Sidney Madden defined the album as a "huge artistic step" because "tracks are offset with deep contemplations about the trauma she's experienced in her life so far and, more pointedly, the double standards in society that black women carry with them when they're objectified". Madden states that it is comparable to a diary in which "she's having a stream of conscious. [...] It's raw. It's real. And it can't be faked".

In a more reserved review for AllMusic, Fred Thomas described the album as, "solid but inconsistent, with one foot in formula-tested mainstream rap and the other in a more confessional, emotionally bare territory that's new for Megan Thee Stallion. Despite its occasional unevenness, the album is exciting in both its moments of audience-tested hitmaking and when Megan cracks the veneer of her invincible persona to share feelings that are difficult, messy, and real."

== Commercial performance ==
Traumazine debuted at number four on the US Billboard 200 with 63,000 album-equivalent units (including 8,000 pure album sales), becoming Megan Thee Stallion's fifth US top-10 album. It descended to number 9 the following week, selling 29,000 units, and then to 23 in its third week.

== Track listing ==
Traumazine track listing
No.	Title	Writer(s)	Producer(s)	Length
1.	"NDA"	Megan Pete; Anthony Holmes	HitKidd	3:21
2.	"Ungrateful" (featuring Key Glock)	Pete; Krishon Gaines; Markeyvius Cathey	Bandplay	2:34
3.	"Not Nice"	Pete; Daniel Simmons; Duevon Desir; Sean Porterfield	D-Sims; P.Raw; SSV	2:46
4.	"Budget" (featuring Latto)	Pete; Alyssa Stephens; Abdallah Ahmad; Jasmine Ethridge; Joshua Parker; Terence Williams	OG Parker; Romano; Rvei	3:22
5.	"Her"	Pete; Alex Petit; Kiowa Roukema; Malibu Babie; Vaugh Oliver	CashMoneyAP; YoungKio; Babie; Oliver	2:17
6.	"Gift & a Curse"	Pete; Joshua Baker; Shane Lindstrom	Murda Beatz	2:52
7.	"Ms. Nasty"	Pete; Diego Avendano; Joel Banks; Shawn Jarrett; Taylor Banks	Bankroll Got It; Diego Ave; Source	2:12
8.	"Who Me" (featuring Pooh Shiesty)	Pete; Lontrell Williams Jr.; Danny Snograss Jr.; Khan Edwards; Baker	KTOE; Taz Taylor	1:58
9.	"Red Wine"	Pete; Ethan Snoreck; J. Banks; Jarrett; T. Banks; David Wilson	Bankroll Got It; Dwilly; Source; Whethan	2:34
10.	"Scary" (featuring Rico Nasty)	Pete; Maria Kelly; Vincent van den Ende	Avedon	2:34
11.	"Anxiety"	Pete; Kevin Price	Go Grizzly	2:15
12.	"Flip Flop"	Pete; Julian Mason; Kelton Scott II; Kelvin Bradshaw; Lloyd Turner; Timothy Hoyle; Walter Scott; William Aquart Jr.	LilJuMadeDaBeat; FranchiseDidIt	2:08
13.	"Consistency" (featuring Jhené Aiko)	Pete; Jhené Aiko Chilombo; Uforo Ebong; Marcus Hodge; Christopher Jasper; Ernest Isley; Marvin Isley; O'Kelly Isley; Ronald Isley; Rudolph Isley	BongoByTheWay; Hodge^{[a]}	3:40
14.	"Star" (featuring Lucky Daye)	Pete; David Brown; Anthony White; Corvell Arteberry	J White	3:30
15.	"Pressurelicious" (featuring Future)	Pete; Nayvadius Wilburn; Harald Hjermann Sørebø; Jorden Thorpe; Holmes	HitKidd; Payday	2:53
16.	"Plan B"	Pete; Donald DeGrate; Dalvin DeGrate; Omar Perrin; Robert Watson	Rob Holladay; Omar Grand	2:44
17.	"Southside Royalty Freestyle" (featuring Sauce Walka, Big Pokey and Lil' Keke)	Pete; Albert Mondane; Marcus Edwards; Milton Powell Jr.; Leroy Williams; Michael Dixon; Jasper; E. Isley; M. Isley; O. Isley; Ronald Isley; Rudolph Isley	Juicy J; Mr. Lee	4:03
18.	"Sweetest Pie" (with Dua Lipa)	Pete; Lipa; Nija Charles; Clarence Coffee Jr.; John Walsh Homen; Sarah Hudson; Mikey Way; Stephen Kozmeniuk; Oscar Leo-Christensen; Parker	Parker; Platinum Libraries; Romano; Koz^{[a]}	3:21
Total length:				51:04

Note

- ^{^[a]} indicates an additional producer

== Personnel ==
- Colin Leonard – mastering (1–14, 17)
- Mike Dean – mastering, mixing (15, 16, 18)
- Jaycen Joshua – mixing (1–14, 17)
- Shawn Jarrett – engineering (1–14, 16–18)
- Joshua Queen – engineering (10)
- Zeke Mishanec – engineering (15)
- Mark Shick – engineering (18)
- Sage Skofield – additional mixing (4)
- DJ Riggins – mixing assistance (1–14, 17)
- Jacob Richards – mixing assistance (1–14, 17)
- Mike Seaberg – mixing assistance (1–14, 17)
- Sean Solymar – mixing assistance (15)
- Tommy Rush – mixing assistance (15)

== Charts ==
=== Weekly charts ===
Weekly chart performance for Traumazine
Chart (2022)	Peak position
Australian Albums (ARIA)	68
Australian Hip Hop/R&B Albums (ARIA)	21
Belgian Albums (Ultratop Flanders)	190
Belgian Albums (Ultratop Wallonia)	197
Canadian Albums (Billboard)	19
French Albums (SNEP)	149
New Zealand Albums (RMNZ)	27
UK Albums (Official Charts)	65
UK R&B Albums (Official Charts)	19
US Billboard 200	4
US Top R&B/Hip-Hop Albums (Billboard)	3

=== Year-end charts ===
2022 year-end chart performance for Traumazine
Chart (2022)	Position
US Billboard 200	193
US Top R&B/Hip-Hop Albums (Billboard)	73

== Certifications ==
Certifications and sales for Traumazine
Region	Certification	Certified units/sales
New Zealand (RMNZ)	Gold	7,500^{‡}
United States (RIAA)	Gold	500,000^{‡}
^{‡} Sales+streaming figures based on certification alone.

== Release history ==
Release dates and formats for Traumazine
Region	Date	Format(s)	Label(s)	Ref.
Various	August 12, 2022	Digital download; streaming	1501 Certified; 300	
Various	August 15, 2022	CD	1501 Certified; 300	
