= Dolly Babe =

American rapper

- Brannon in 2026

Background information
- Born: Latiffini Brannon; October 22, 1998 (age 28); Dallas, Texas, U.S.
- Genre: Hip-hop
- Years active: 2022–present
- Label: 300 Entertainment

Latiffini Brannon (born October 22, 1998), known professionally as Dolly Babe, is an American rapper based in Dallas, Texas. She is best known for her breakout song "Pink Blush" and its remix featuring Megan Thee Stallion, which also marked her debut appearance on the Billboard Hot 100. She previously gained local attention in the Dallas-Fort Worth area and went viral online for songs including "Beyonce".

== Biography ==
Dolly Babe is based in Dallas, and was born on October 22, 1998. She released her first song in 2022. She began garnering local attention in 2023 for her "diva persona and unapologetically outspoken lyrics" in songs like "Bama" and "Get Cute", and her music videos were noted by Dallas and Fort Worth-based influencers. She was named a Rapper to Watch by the Dallas Observer in January 2024. She released 9 singles in 2024.

Her first TikTok hit was her 2024 song "Beyoncé", which was inspired by Beyoncé's 2008 song "Diva". The song went viral on TikTok. She stated that she received permission from Beyoncé to keep the song up.

Her song "Pink Blush" first brought her international attention, being called the TikTok song of the summer by Complex and charting on the TurnTable Top 100 Songs. It reached over 14 million views, and received reposts from singers including Madonna and Rihanna. A TikTok trend also became popular of a group of people, usually all men, "seductively" mouthing the words to her "cunnilingus-exalting" post-chorus. Billboard noted her "bubbly, tongue-in-cheek delivery" and "onomatopoeia-laden bars" when declaring the song both "TikTok's favorite audio of late" and "a legitimate streaming hit". She delayed the song's music video release until August 2026.

She signed to 300 Entertainment in September 2026, and subsequently released a remix of "Pink Blush" featuring Megan Thee Stallion, which both Rolling Out's David Kesiena and That Grape Juice's Rashad mused may make it onto the Billboard Hot 100. They were ultimately proven right: the song debuted at rank 58 on the Billboard Hot 100 chart for the week of October 10, 2026. As of October 20, 2026, the song had been charting on the Billboard Hot 100 for 3 weeks. Complex named Dolly Babe number 49 on their "100 Hottest Rappers Right Now" list for October 2026, and Hits called her an emerging new star.

== Discography ==
=== Singles ===
Title	Year	Peak chart positions	
Title	Year	US	NGA
"Ballerina"	2022	—	—
"Get Cute"	2023	—	—
"Girly Girl"	2024	—	—
"Get Cute"	2024	—	—
"Magic Trick"	2024	—	—
"Get Money"	2024	—	—
"Throw It"	2024	—	—
"Cheeseburger"	2024	—	—
"Bama"	2024	—	—
"Chica Bonita"	2024	—	—
"Beyonce"	2024	—	—
"Ghetto Fabulous"	2025	—	—
"Money"	2025	—	—
"Get On Yo Ten"	2025	—	—
"The Black Paris Hilton"	2025	—	—
"If You Ain't Scared"	2026	—	—
"Cancel the Reservation"	2026	—	—
"Pink Blush" (solo or remix featuring Megan Thee Stallion)	2026	58	80
"Hittin"	2026	—	—
