= Tina Tuesday Freestyle =

2026 promotional single by Megan Thee Stallion

Promotional single by Megan Thee Stallion

from the EP Tina Tuesday Freestyles
- Released: September 29, 2026
- Genre: Hip-hop
- Length: 1:57
- Label: Hot Girl Productions; Interscope
- Songwriter: Megan Pete
- Producer: Buddah Bless

Music video
- "Tina Tuesday Freestyle" on YouTube

"Tina Tuesday Freestyle" is a song by American rapper Megan Thee Stallion, released as a promotional single on September 29, 2026 and later featured on her EP Tina Tuesday Freestyles, released on October 24. Produced by Buddah Bless, it contains a sample of "Still Tippin'" by Mike Jones.

== Critical reception ==
Billboard described the song as “hard-hitting” and said “Tina Snow is back and she didn't waste a bar on the freestyle”.

== Music video ==
The music video, which was the only way to listen to the song after its release, is described as “minimalist” by Pitchfork, “focusing on Meg and a single prop, a shiny orange lowrider”.

== Charts ==
Chart performance for "Tina Tuesday Freestyle"
Chart (2026)	Peak position
US Bubbling Under Hot 100 (Billboard)	8
US Hot R&B/Hip-Hop Songs (Billboard)	24
