= Pink Blush =

2026 single by Dolly Babe

Single by Dolly Babe
- Released: June 30, 2026
- Length: 2:06
- Label: ONErpm
- Songwriters: Latiffini Brannon; Danielwsp; Megan Pete (remix)
- Producer: Danielwsp

Dolly Babe singles chronology
"Cancel the Reservation" (2026)	"Pink Blush" (2026)

Remix cover

Megan Thee Stallion singles chronology
"DNA (More Than a Game)" (2026)	"Pink Blush (Remix)" (2026)

Music video
- "Pink Blush" on YouTube

"Pink Blush" is a song by American rapper Dolly Babe, released on June 30, 2026. It is her breakout song, and gained traction on TikTok in mid-2026. An official remix of the song featuring American rapper Megan Thee Stallion was released on September 24, 2026. It peaked at number 58 on the Billboard Hot 100, becoming Dolly Babe's first song to chart.

== Music video ==
The music video was released on August 18, 2026. It was directed by Ceven Imperial.

== Charts ==
Chart performance for "Pink Blush" (original and remix)
Chart (2026)	Peak position
Nigeria (TurnTable)	80
Nigeria Top Hip-Hop/Rap Songs (TurnTable)	8
US Billboard Hot 100	58
US Hot R&B/Hip-Hop Songs (Billboard)	13
US Rhythmic Airplay (Billboard)	9
