= 300 Entertainment =

American record label

- Parent company: Warner Music Group
- Founded: 2012
- Founder: Lyor Cohen; Kevin Liles; Todd Moscowitz; Roger Gold
- Distributors: Atlantic Music Group (US); Warner Music Group (International)
- Genre: Various
- Country of origin: United States
- Location: New York City
- Official website: 300ent.com

300 Entertainment LLC is an American record label owned by Warner Music Group. It was founded by Lyor Cohen, Kevin Liles, Todd Moscowitz, and Roger Gold in 2012. The label's roster includes acts across multiple genres such as hip hop, rock, pop, electronic, alternative, and country. Current artists include Young Thug, Fetty Wap, Mary J. Blige, No Savage, Bella Kay, Rejjie Snow, Cheat Codes, Tee Grizzley, Famous Dex, Shy Glizzy, Cobi, Meg Mac, Dae Dae, the Hunna, Bailey Bryan, OMB Peezy, AmiiFy, Ice Prince, Snot, Dolly Babe, and Des Rocs. It is based in New York City. The label also acts as distributor for Young Thug's record label YSL Records, whose roster includes rappers such as the late Lil Keed.

In 2021, Warner Music Group acquired 300 for $400 million. In June 2022, 300 Entertainment was merged with Elektra Music Group to create the umbrella label 300 Elektra Entertainment (3EE), though both Elektra and 300 continued to maintain their separate identities as labels.

== History ==
=== Foundation ===
Cohen resigned as chairman and chief executive officer of Warner Music Group's recorded music operation to start 300 with Todd Moscowitz, ex-Warner Bros president, Kevin Liles, ex-EVP Warner Music, and Roger Gold, former SVP of the office of the chairman and CEO at Warner Music. Cohen, Liles, and Moscowitz had also worked together at Def Jam Recordings, which Cohen had run in the 1980s and 1990s.

It was announced that singer Eric Bellinger had been signed to 300 Entertainment. In April 2014, Atlantic Records A&R DJ Drama stated that Atlanta rapper Young Thug had been signed to 300 Entertainment, In June 2014, it was revealed that Atlanta hip hop group Migos were also signed to the label. In early 2014, Lyor Cohen quietly signed Conrad Sewell after Sewell had been passed on by most of the major labels. The day after signing with 300, the Australian singer received offers from virtually every label that had passed on him, for, in some cases, "well over $1 million."

As of 2017, Fetty Wap's "Trap Queen" is the label's biggest single to date, going 10× platinum. Its first pop hit was Cheat Codes' "No Promises" featuring Demi Lovato. Its first country pop artist to be signed is Bailey Bryan.

=== Exit of Cohen ===
In September 2016, Lyor Cohen announced his exit from 300. Following this announcement, Kevin Liles assumed the role of CEO. Liles would make appearances to follow in The Wall Street Journal and on MSNBC to discuss his role and the label.

== Partnerships ==
=== Funding ===
The company is backed by a wide range of investors, including Google, investment firm Columbus Nova, Israeli-American hedge fund billionaire Noam Gottesman's TOMS Capital, former Warner Music digital chief Alex Zubillaga, and Kemado Records' co-founder Andres Santo Domingo. The investment agreements were pulled together by media investment banker Aryeh Bourkoff and Ori Winitze of LionTree.

=== Atlantic Records ===
Atlantic Records signed a distribution deal to distribute all of 300's content in November 2013.

=== +1 Records ===
In 2014, 300 announced that +1 Records had become an official partner label of the company.

=== YSL Records ===
In November 2016, Young Thug started YSL Records as an imprint under 300 Entertainment. Artists who have been signed to the imprint include Gunna, Lil Keed and Yung Kayo.

=== Unauthorized Entertainment ===
In February 2017, the label's Senior Vice President of A&R, Selim Bouab, launched the label Unauthorized Entertainment under 300.

=== Murder Inc. Records ===
In June 2017, it was announced that 300 Entertainment had partnered with Murder Inc. Records.

=== Undercover Prodigy ===
In September 2017, Hopsin did an interview with HardKnocktv stating that he had signed with 300. His single "The Purge" was released through 300 Entertainment and Undercover Prodigy. On November 24, 2017, Hopsin Released his album No Shame and debuted at 42 on the Billboard 200. Both Kevin Liles and Hopsin has referred to the deal as a partnership for 300 and Undercover Prodigy.

=== Producers ===
Some of 300 Entertainment signed producers include Chason Samuel, Metro Boomin, Young Thug, PinkPantheress, and others.

== Artists ==
Artist	Year signed	Albums with 300
Shy Glizzy	2014	Law 3: Now or Never (2014); Young Jefe 2 (2016); The World is Yours (2017); Fully Loaded (2018)
Young Thug	2014	Barter 6 (2015); I'm Up (2016); Slime Season 3 (2016); Jeffery (2016); Beautiful Thugger Girls (2017); So Much Fun (2019); Slime & B (2020); Punk (2021); Business Is Business (2023)
Fetty Wap	2014	Fetty Wap (2015); For My Fans (2018); Bruce Wayne (2018); Trap & B (2020); The Butterfly Effect (2021)
Highly Suspect	2014	Mister Asylum (2015); The Boy Who Died Wolf (2016); MCID (2019)
Mainland	2014	Outcast EP (2015); Villains EP (2018)
Cobi	2015	Songs from the Ashes PT. 1 (2017); Songs from the Ashes PT. 2 (2018)
Meg Mac	2015	Low Blows (2017); Hope (2019)
Maggie Lindemann	2016	
The Hunna	2016	100 (2016)
Famous Dex	2016	Dex Meets Dexter (2018); Dexter 2031 (EP) (2020)
Cheat Codes	2016	Level 1 (EP) (2018); Level 2 (EP) (2019) (International distribution through Parlophone, since 2018 co-signed with Spinnin' Records, another Warner Music Group subsidiary.)
YNW Melly	2016	I Am You (mixtape) (2018); We All Shine (mixtape) (2019); Melly vs. Melvin (2019); Just a Matter of Slime (2021)
Tee Grizzley	2017	Bloodas (2017); Activated (2018); Scriptures (2019); The Smartest (2020); Built for Whatever (2021)
Bailey Bryan	2017	So Far (EP) (2017); Perspective (EP) (2019)
OMB Peezy	2017	Humble Beginnings (EP) (2017); Preacher to the Streets (2019)
Agnez Mo	2018	
Lil Keed	2018	Keed Talk to 'Em (2018); Long Live Mexico (2019); Trapped on Cleveland 3 (2020)
Megan Thee Stallion	2018	Tina Snow (2018); Fever (2019); Suga (2020); Good News (2020) Traumazine (2022)
Phony Ppl	2018	mō'zā-ik.(2018)
Nova Miller	2019	
Drax Project	2019	Drax Project (2019)
Snot	2019	Beautiful Havoc (2020); Ethereal (2022)
Waterparks	2020	Greatest Hits (2021)
Des Rocs	2021	This is Our Life (EP) (2020); A Real Good Person In A Real Bad Place (2021)
María Becerra	2021	Animal (2021); La Nena de Argentina (2022)
Mary J. Blige	2021	Good Morning Gorgeous (2022)
Quarters of Change	2021	Into The Rift (2022); Portraits (2024)
Jordan Adetunji	2024	A Jaguar's Dream (2025)
AmiiFy	2025	Suddenly, Everything's Changing (EP) (2026)
Dolly Babe	2026	"Pink Blush" (2026) (single)
Lil Duke	2016	Duke Hefner (2021) Blue Devil 2 (2019)
Whiterosemoxie	2016	TROJAN (2021)
