= Top (album) =

2020 album by YoungBoy Never Broke Again

Studio album by YoungBoy Never Broke Again
- Released: September 11, 2020
- Genre: Hip-hop
- Length: 54:42
- Labels: Never Broke Again; Atlantic
- Producers: 12Hunna; 17OnDaTrack; 1Mind; Aaron Selva; ABOnTheBeat; AKel; Ayo Bleu; BJ Beatz; BxsedJay; Cássio; Cheese; Cubeatz; DJ Suede the Remix God; DrellOnTheTrack; D-Rok; Drum Dummie; Dubba-AA; Dzimi; HitmanAudio; Humblebee; India Got Them Beats; Jack LoMastro; JetsonMade; Jonnie Hope; Julia Lewis; Karltin Bankz; LayZ; LC; LondnBlue; Mike Laury; Neeko Baby; Palaze; PlayboyXO; SephGotTheWaves; Smash David; TayTayMadeIt; Tenroc; Trapman TwoThree; Trauma Tone; Vinnyforgood; Wallis Lane; WassamWop; Wheezy; Wwind

YoungBoy Never Broke Again chronology
38 Baby 2 (2020)	Top (2020)	Until I Return (2020)

Singles from Top
- 1. "All In" Released: August 3, 2020; 2. "Kacey Talk" Released: August 13, 2020; 3. "Callin" Released: September 1, 2020

Top is the second studio album by American rapper YoungBoy Never Broke Again, released on September 11, 2020, by Never Broke Again and Atlantic Records. The album follows his debut album Until Death Call My Name, released over two years before. The album features guest appearances from Lil Wayne and Snoop Dogg, alongside production from Cheese, Cubeatz, DJ Suede the Remix God, JetsonMade, Smash David, and Wheezy.

Top received generally positive reviews from critics who highlighted the album's versatility and material. It debuted at number one on the US Billboard 200 chart, in which it earned 126,000 album-equivalent units, of which 19,000 were pure album sales. Nine of the twenty-one tracks from the album debuted on the Billboard Hot 100. The album was supported by three singles: "All In", "Kacey Talk" and "Callin".

== Release and promotion ==
Following the release of 38 Baby and after releasing music continuously for four years, YoungBoy announced that he would take a brief hiatus from releasing new music. At the time, he tweeted, "After Friday [38 Baby 2's release], I'll never release a song/album again until I'm in a better situation". He also publicly asked his label for his masters in exchange for four new albums. However, the label declined this offer. The album was announced by YoungBoy on August 20 through his social media, along with the date, and indicated the project would consist of 18 tracks. By August 25, the album reached number one on Apple Music based on pre-orders alone. On August 30, Gaulden tweeted that he wanted to add additional tracks to the album to change it to 21. Just a day before the album's release, Gaulden shared the album's tracklist, previewing 21 songs alongside features from Lil Wayne and Snoop Dogg.

Upon the album's release, Gaulden released the official music video for the album's eleventh cut, "Dead Trollz" directed by FlyGuyNick. Just a day later, on September 12, Gaulden released the official music video for the album's twentieth track, "Peace Hardly", also directed by FlyGuyNick.

=== Singles ===
On September 26, 2019, Gaulden released the album's eighteenth cut, "House Arrest Tingz" exclusively on his YouTube channel. On June 16, 2020, Gaulden released the album's seventeenth cut, "Sticks with Me" exclusively to his YouTube channel, along with a Rich Porter-directed video, which shows YoungBoy in one scene performing in and around a casket and gravesite. On August 3, Gaulden released the album's lead single, "All In". On it, YoungBoy deals with heartbreak and loss over a guitar-tinged production. The track was produced by Yung Lan, LC, 12Hunna, and BJ Beatz; it later peaked at number 67 on the Billboard Hot 100. The album's second single, "Kacey Talk" was released on August 13, 2020, featuring ad-libs from YoungBoy's son Kacey who appears in the video along with one of his brother's Kayden. The track was produced by Cheese, Julia Lewis, and 1Mind; it peaked at number 50 on the Billboard Hot 100. On August 26, following the album's announcement, Gaulden released the album's sixteenth cut, "Murder Business" exclusively to his YouTube channel. The album's third and final single, "Callin" featuring Snoop Dogg, described as a "minimal and smooth" track, showcasing Gaulden's signature aggressive "punch and high energy", was released on September 1. On September 9, Gaulden released the non-album single, "Soul Stealer" which failed to appear on the album.

== Cover art ==
The album cover was revealed along with the album's announcement. It immediately drew criticism for its similarities to that of Atlantic Records labelmate Roddy Ricch's Please Excuse Me for Being Antisocial (2019). Both covers are shot in black and white and features similar poses and clothing. Zoe Johnson of XXL noted: "NBA YoungBoy, however, is wearing two iced-out Cuban link choker chains, which sit on the neckline of his shirt while Roddy's jewelry is tucked inside of his shirt". Ricch responded in now-deleted tweets, writing, "It's only ONE roddy". He also downplayed any issues between him and YoungBoy: "And I been good wit dude so don't make it about him... I'm just tired of all this comparing stuff".

== Critical reception ==
Professional ratings
Review scores
Source	Rating
AllMusic	4/5 stars
Consequence of Sound	C+
HipHopDX	3.7/5

Top received generally positive reviews from music critics. Fred Thomas from AllMusic stated that YoungBoy has reached a new level of "versatility and expression." He further states that "the material is some of his strongest, managing commercial accessibility while giving a more authentic view of his personality than anything he's done before." Okla Jones from Consequence of Sound stated that "YoungBoy Never Broke Again will undoubtedly garner more notoriety following the release of Top," however, she also mentions that "YoungBoy's biggest flaw is sometimes not having much new to say." She concludes her review by adding "While this overall body of work may leave many things to be desired from an artistic standpoint, it also gives voice to an entire community of Southern youth."

Josh Svetz from HipHopDX states that "the raps offer up the pristine voyeuristic escapism into the neighborhoods white suburbanites wouldn't be caught dead setting foot in." He also mentions that "YoungBoy's songwriting makes mainstream rap feel dangerous again." Finalizing his review, he declares that "Top reinforces that no matter how famous YoungBoy gets – he'll always keep it real, something we rarely see in today's world."

=== Year-end lists ===
Select year-end rankings of Top
Publication	List	Rank
Complex	The Best Albums of 2020	31

== Commercial performance ==
Top debuted at number one on the US Billboard 200 with 126,000 album-equivalent units (including 19,000 pure album sales) in its first week, becoming YoungBoy's third number-one album overall, as well as his second number-one album in 2020. The album also dethroned Big Sean's Detroit 2 from the Billboard 200's number one position. It also accumulated a total of 156.32 million on-demand US streams from all its tracks, in the week ending September 26, 2020.

Top also helped YoungBoy accumulate a new record in the rap-related history of the Billboard 200, making him the fastest rapper to have AI YoungBoy 2 and 38 Baby 2 debut atop the chart within five months, while the latter and Top debuted between six months, a total of three number one albums in ten months, with the former two being the fastest recorded and surpassing a previous record held by DMX. DMX previously debuted at number one within a seven-month period with 1998's It's Dark and Hell Is Hot and Flesh of My Flesh, Blood of My Blood.

== Track listing ==
Top track listing
No.	Title	Writer(s)	Producer(s)	Length
1.	"Drug Addiction"	Kentrell Gaulden; Benjamin Hubble; Christoffer Marcussen	Palaze; LayZ Beats	2:44
2.	"Cross Roads"	Gaulden; Joseph Boyden; John Carrington Jr.; Keenan Webb	Keenan Webb; Trauma Tone; Seph Got the Waves	2:48
3.	"The Last Backyard..."	Gaulden; Tavian Dawson Carter	TayTayMadeIt	2:36
4.	"Right Foot Creep"	Gaulden; Carter	TayTayMadeIt	2:39
5.	"Dirty Stick"	Gaulden; Daniel Lebrun; Logan Christopher; Sven Steenbergen	D-Roc; 17onDaTrack; ABonTheBeat	2:49
6.	"Kacey Talk"	Gaulden; Julia Lewis; Jason Goldberg; Sebastian Lopez	Cheese; Julia Lewis; 1Mind	2:31
7.	"My Window" (featuring Lil Wayne)	Gaulden; Dwayne Carter Jr.; Jason Cornet; Samuel Jimenez	Smash David; TenRoc	3:12
8.	"I'm Up"	Gaulden; Wesley Glass; Aaron Selva	Wheezy; Aaron Selva^{[a]}	2:26
9.	"Off Season"	Gaulden; Aaron Lockhart; Mike Laury; Jonathon Montoya	Dubba-AA; Mike Laury; Jonnie Hope	2:38
10.	"All In"	Gaulden; Luke Clay; Michael O'Brien; Brandon Russell	Yung Lan; LC; 12Hunna; BJ Beatz	2:36
11.	"Dead Trollz"	Gaulden; Jarrian Thompson; Lukas Payne; Sterling Reynolds	PlayboyXO; LondnBlue; Karltin Bankz	3:29
12.	"Fuck Ya!"	Gaulden; Don'Taye Shephard; Gregory Sanders Jr.; Allen Kelly	Hitman Audio; AKel; WassamWop	3:04
13.	"Big Bankroll"	Gaulden; Brandon Russel; Jaylen Jackson; Kendrell Mattox	BJ Beatz; DrellOnTheTrack; BxsedJay	3:20
14.	"Boom"	Gaulden; Braylen Rembert; Sanders	Hitman Audio; Ayo Bleu	2:28
15.	"Reaper's Child"	Gaulden; Vincent Verdi; Kevin Gomringer; Tim Gomringer; Jack Lomastro; Nizzy; Farsi	Wallis Lane; Vinny For Good; Cubeatz; Jack Lomastro	3:23
16.	"Murder Business"	Gaulden; India Williams; Gregory Sanders	India Got Them Beats; Hitman Audio	2:12
17.	"Sticks with Me"	Gaulden; Don'Taye Shephard; Daniel Wright	WassamWop; Trapman TwoThree	2:49
18.	"House Arrest Tingz"	Gaulden; Brian Carroll; Tevin Revell	Drum Dummie	2:48
19.	"To My Lowest"	Gaulden; Mattox; Nikola Pejovic	DrellOnTheTrack; DZIMI	3:05
20.	"Peace Hardly"	Gaulden; Dondre Moore; Tahj Morgan; Tobias Fagerstroem	JetsonMade; Neeko Baby; Humblebee	2:42
21.	"Callin" (featuring Snoop Dogg)	Gaulden; Calvin Broadus Jr.; Cassio Bouziane; Vincent Verdi; Paimon Jahanbin; Nima Jahanbin; Goldberg	Cheese; Cássio; Vinny For Good; Wallis Lane	2:23
Total length:				54:42

Notes

- ^{^[a]} signifies a co-producer

== Personnel ==
Credits adapted from Tidal.

Musicians

- YoungBoy Never Broke Again – vocals (all tracks)
- Lil Wayne – vocals (7)
- Snoop Dogg – vocals (21)

Technical

- Mark Dorflinger – mastering, mixing (1, 2, 4, 5, 8, 9, 18–20)
- Jason "Cheese" Goldberg – mastering, mixing (6, 7, 10, 12, 14, 15, 21)
- Khris "XO" James – mastering, mixing (3, 13, 16, 17)
- Chris Athens – mastering (16)

== Charts ==
=== Weekly charts ===
Chart performance for Top
Chart (2020)	Peak position
Belgian Albums (Ultratop Flanders)	167
Canadian Albums (Billboard)	4
Dutch Albums (Album Top 100)	50
French Albums (SNEP)	146
UK Albums (Official Charts)	62
US Billboard 200	1
US Top R&B/Hip-Hop Albums (Billboard)	1

=== Year-end charts ===
2020 year-end chart performance for Top
Chart (2020)	Position
US Billboard 200	121
US Top R&B/Hip-Hop Albums (Billboard)	44

2021 year-end chart performance for Top
Chart (2021)	Position
US Billboard 200	64
US Top R&B/Hip-Hop Albums (Billboard)	40

2022 year-end chart performance for Top
Chart (2022)	Position
US Billboard 200	128

== Certifications ==
Region	Certification	Certified units/sales
United States (RIAA)	2× Platinum	2,000,000^{‡}
^{‡} Sales+streaming figures based on certification alone.

== Release history ==
Release dates and formats for Top
Region	Date	Label(s)	Format(s)	Edition(s)	Ref.
Various	September 11, 2020	Never Broke Again; Atlantic	Digital download; streaming	Standard	
United States	January 28, 2022	Never Broke Again; Atlantic	LP	Standard	

== See also ==
- 2020 in hip-hop
- List of Billboard 200 number-one albums of 2020
