= Cry Baby (Megan Thee Stallion song) =

2021 single by Megan Thee Stallion featuring DaBaby

Single by Megan Thee Stallion featuring DaBaby

from the album Good News
- Released: February 3, 2021
- Genre: Hip hop
- Length: 2:17
- Label: 1501 Certified; 300
- Composers: David Doman; Katie Smith; Daniel Levin
- Lyricists: Megan Pete; Jonathan Kirk
- Producer: D.A Got That Dope

Megan Thee Stallion singles chronology
"34+35" (remix) (2021)	"Cry Baby" (2021)	"I'm a King" (2021)

DaBaby singles chronology
"Throat Baby (Go Baby)" (remix) (2021)	"Cry Baby" (2021)	"Beat Box 3" (2021)

Music video
- "Cry Baby" on YouTube

"Cry Baby" is a song by American rapper-songwriter Megan Thee Stallion, featuring fellow American rapper DaBaby. Their third collaboration, it was released on November 20, 2020, as the third track from Megan's debut studio album, Good News, and was sent to urban contemporary radio as the fourth single from the album on February 3, 2021. A bass-heavy, raunchy track, it finds the rappers talking about their busy sex lives. The song received mostly positive reviews from critics, with Megan singled out, and some comparing it to one of their previous collaborations, Megan's 2019 song, "Cash Shit". It also spawned a TikTok dance challenge.

An adult-themed Toy Story-inspired music video directed by Colin Tilley was released on February 3, 2021, and features Megan and DaBaby as dolls that come to life in a playing house, drag racing and dancing around a toy store.

== Background ==
The song marks the third collaboration between Megan and DaBaby, following Megan's 2019 song "Cash Shit", and DaBaby's 2020 song "Nasty", the latter song also with American singer-songwriter Ashanti. both of which charted on the Billboard Hot 100. In a 2020 interview, Megan expressed interest in doing a full-length project with DaBaby, stating that they have already discussed it and they "definitely need to get to work on that". "Cry Baby" went viral on the video-sharing app, TikTok, where it spawned a dance challenge called the #CryBabyChallenge. Megan posted a video of her doing the dance on Instagram on February 6, 2021. The song amassed over 120 million streams by February 2021. Megan teased the song's video a month before its release, after DaBaby received criticism from fans for collaborating with Tory Lanez, who allegedly shot Megan in 2020. Lanez had posted a video of him and DaBaby working together, however Megan clarified in a tweet that the collaboration was old and its release was revoked in the wake of the shooting, while also revealing that the "Cry Baby" video was on the way.

== Composition ==
"Cry Baby" is a throbbing, bouncy, slow, brooding, "tic-tock-ing" song, with a "haunting", looped backing track of a crying baby, and "heavy, synth-bass-laden" set of melodies. Lyrically, it sees Megan and DaBaby listing off their sexual partners, with Megan employing her alter ego, Hot Girl Meg. She delivers a "frenetic" flow about growing impatient and frustrated with her lover who leaves her unsatisfied. She is also heard making "fake-me-out" crying noises. Riff magazine's Tim Hoffman noted "Megan taking ownership of her sexuality, as she plays on the tropes of sexist attitudes toward women in hip-hop with a tongue-in-cheek reversal about the men she's got wrapped around her finger". DaBaby, meanwhile, with his distinctive "laconic" flow, delivers sexually explicit lyrics, on par with Megan's. He also pays homage to Megan's posterior with the line "NBA playoffs that ass–a bubble".

== Critical reception ==
Carl Lamarre of Billboard said, "Though Meg's rhyme scheme bests her Charlotte counterpart, she and Baby shine together as a formidable team". Similarly, Thelma Khupe of New Wave magazine said "Megan and Dababy are a formidable duo with an unmatched on screen and musical chemistry, demonstrated on songs like 'Cash Shit' and their XXL Freshman freestyle in 2019. 'Cry Baby' is another example of their ability to bounce off each other whilst both maintaining a high lyrical standard from start to finish. NME's Kyann-Sian Williams said, "If this is an attempt to recreate the success of their previous collaboration 'Cash Shit', which was one of the biggest songs of 2019, the duo don't entirely rise to the challenge – but on its own merits [...] Megan showing up her male counterpart with her frenetic flow". In their album review, Pitchfork's Mankaprr Conteh wrote: "when she [Megan] gets a rap assist—like on 'Movie' with Lil Durk or 'Cry Baby' with DaBaby—she does her hardest work, fueled by collaboration (or more likely, competition). In popularity and proficiency, Megan is ahead of her peers across gender". Consequence of Sound praised Megan as she "eagerly goes round for round with DaBaby on 'Cry Baby' and does it with titillating precision". Conversely, Craig Jenkins of Vulture said Megan "again stir fry"'s DaBaby. Okayplayer agreed, stating: "Megan and DaBaby are chasing the feeling that was on 'Cash Shit'. This is a good attempt. But, honestly, Meg comes harder than her counterpart. The level of aggression she brings to 'Cry Baby' is admirable. The track is sex-positive and it's a surefire staple on the release". Jessie Atkins of Gigwise highlighted the line "Don't fuck me like that, fuck me like this" as showing "the hand she [Megan] plays to great effect again and again". Earmilk's Kalen Murphy named the song an immediate standout on Good News, calling it "electrifying", and stating: "It's songs like this that are responsible for Megan's allure as she effortlessly boasts about possessing prowess that could make a man want to wear her hoodie". Margaret Farrell found the track to be "eerie but mesmerizing". Konstantinos Pappis of Our Culture Mag called the song a "throwaway", and said DaBaby takes up too much space.

== Music video ==
The official video was released on February 3, 2021. It was directed by Colin Tilley, who also directed Megan's videos for "Body", "Don't Stop", and her collaboration "WAP". Kellon Deryck and Coca Michelle, the same hairstylist and nail artist from the "WAP" video were employed for "Cry Baby". Megan was styled by Brookelyn Styles and wore custom looks from designers Venus Prototype and Bryan Hearns. The visual features a cameo from Instagram comedian BlameItonKWay who appears as his alter-ego, TiTi. A reflection of the track's playful nature, it received comparisons to Toy Story, as it sees Megan Thee Stallion and DaBaby as doll-like figures wreaking havoc in an elaborate dollhouse. The video reenacts, specifically, the Al's Toy Barn toy store scenes from Toy Story 2. The visual and Megan's looks were deemed to be reminiscent of the '90s and early 2000s era.

=== Synopsis ===
The music video opens at a toy shop called TiTi's Toy Store, with the owner, TiTi (BlameItonKWay), play-fighting with Barbie dolls before closing the shop. As soon as the shop closes, the video cuts to a "trippy, adult version of Toy Story". The toys (Megan, DaBaby, and dozens of dancers) come alive and break out of their boxes and make their way to places where they are not allowed to be. DaBaby portrays an action figure, performing his verse, alongside clones of himself, in a Hot Wheels racetrack loop, bringing a touch of "nostalgia", as Megan, a twerking Barbie, does stunts in a latex crash test dummy suit. She is also seen dancing and rapping atop a life-sized, "vapor wave aesthetic" Barbie dream house and disco stage. Along with her dancers, they perform the "WAP" dance to an audience of intoxicated stuffed animals. They also twerk in remote control 4x4's, in and around lego cities, and along with "bulky" robots on the shop's floor. Toys on the shelves are seen doing animated twerking and dancing. The rapper's later get in a car together and go on a wild chase with the store's toys. The video concludes with TiTi returning, letting out a loud scream as they find the store in a mess.

Megan Thee Stallion wears a 50-inch long platinum, pastel-pink, floral waist-length weave, which was stenciled together in two hours.

=== Wardrobe ===
BlameItonKWay, who appears first in the video has a waist-length turquoise wig with top knots and a crown of braids. Megan sports various toy-inspired looks, including a yellow racetrack jumpsuit, a pink Barbie doll bikini with blue flowers, and a floral hula girl outfit. In between scenes, she also has a bouquet-like headpiece on top of her hair, a pastel pink waist-length hairdo, and black pigtails with a zig-zag middle part. The dancers wear heavy eyelashes, electric blue eyeshadow, winged liner, and subtle rhinestones to match Megan's bedazzled floral nails. The 50-inch long platinum, pastel-coloured floral look two hours to hand-paint with a stencil. The hairstylist was aiming for a "Malibu Barbie"-look.

=== Reception ===
Billboard's Larls Brandle said "[Director] Tilley's creation is a blast of color, splashed across a psychedelic toy shop filled with twerking toys. Think Alice in Wonderland for (naughty) adults". Shaad D'Souza of The Fader called it an "R-rated Toy Story", describing it as a "typically ostentatious, extremely fun visual spectacle". Teen Vogue called the video a "fever dream" of Toy Story and said the video "is dreamy pop art, only magnifying the delicious taunting vibe of the song". Margaret Blatz of Elite Daily said the video gave them "life", praising its "bright colors and amazing dance moves". Joan Summers of Jezebel called it "a sublime artistic experience", but questioned, "It's a bummer, really, that DaBaby didn't dress up for this, but when have men ever put in the same effort?".

== Charts ==
=== Weekly charts ===
Weekly chart performance for "Cry Baby"
Chart (2020–2021)	Peak position
Canada Hot 100 (Billboard)	86
Global 200 (Billboard)	66
UK Indie (Official Charts)	41
US Billboard Hot 100	28
US Hot R&B/Hip-Hop Songs (Billboard)	13
US R&B/Hip-Hop Airplay (Billboard)	3
US Rhythmic Airplay (Billboard)	14

=== Year-end charts ===
Year-end chart performance for "Cry Baby"
Chart (2021)	Position
US Billboard Hot 100	77
US Hot R&B/Hip-Hop Songs (Billboard)	34

== Certifications ==
Certifications for "Cry Baby"
Region	Certification	Certified units/sales
New Zealand (RMNZ)	Gold	15,000^{‡}
United States (RIAA)	2× Platinum	2,000,000^{‡}
^{‡} Sales+streaming figures based on certification alone.
