= Through the Storm =

Through the Storm may refer to:

== Albums ==
- Through the Storm (Aretha Franklin album), 1989
- Through the Storm (Riot album), 2002
- Through the Storm (Yolanda Adams album), 1991

== Songs ==
- "Through the Storm" (Aretha Franklin and Elton John song), 1989
- "Through the Storm" (YoungBoy Never Broke Again song), 2018
- "Through da Storm", a 2019 song by Polo G

== Other uses ==
- Through the Storm, a 1914 silent film starring Francis X. Bushman
- Through the Storm: A Real Story of Fame and Family in a Tabloid World, a 2008 book
