= Dirty Iyanna (song) =

Single by YoungBoy Never Broke Again

Single by YoungBoy Never Broke Again

from the album AI Youngboy 2 (intended)
- Released: December 12, 2019
- Genre: Trap
- Length: 4:13
- Label: Never Broke Again; Atlantic
- Songwriters: Kentrell DeSean Gaulden; Michael Jackson; Nicholas B. Seeley; Alex Petit, Sr.
- Producers: Nick Seeley; CashMoneyAP

YoungBoy Never Broke Again singles chronology
"Bring 'Em Out" (2019)	"Dirty Iyanna" (2019)	"Make No Sense" (2020)

Music video
- "Dirty Iyanna" on YouTube

"Dirty Iyanna" is a song by American rapper YoungBoy Never Broke Again. It is a flip of Michael Jackson's 1988 chart-topper "Dirty Diana" and a diss toward Floyd Mayweather Jr. and his daughter Iyanna Mayweather, the mother of his child. The song was released on December 12, 2019, and was produced by Nick Seeley and CashMoneyAP.

== Background ==
"Dirty Iyanna" was released following a breakup between YoungBoy and Iyanna.

== Composition ==
The track both samples and interpolates Michael Jackson's 1988, "Dirty Diana" as YoungBoy carries out Michael's flow, however, he speaks about things that have allegedly happened in their relationship while swapping "Dianna" for "Iyanna". The track was described as "rock-fused" by Billboard's Michael Saponara.

== Music video ==
The music video was released alongside the single. Directed by LouieKnows, the video sees Iyanna in a mask slashing the tires and throwing a rock at YoungBoy's car, which allegedly happened months before. Furthermore, it sees Iyanna being sneaky and "dirty" as she disrespects YoungBoy's space.

== Charts ==
Chart performance for "Dirty Iyanna"
Chart (2019)	Peak position
US Billboard Hot 100	67
US Hot R&B/Hip-Hop Songs (Billboard)	28
