= Girls in the Hood =

Single by Megan Thee Stallion

from the album Good News
- Released: June 26, 2020
- Genre: Hip hop
- Length: 2:34
- Label: 1501 Certified; 300
- Songwriters: Andre Young; Bobby Sessions; Eric Lynn Wright; Ilyah Fraser; Megan Pete; O'Shea Jackson; Scott Spencer Storch
- Producers: IllaDaProducer; Scott Storch

Megan Thee Stallion singles chronology
"RNB" (2020)	"Girls in the Hood" (2020)	"WAP" (2020)

"Girls in the Hood" is a song by American rapper Megan Thee Stallion from her debut studio album, Good News (2020). It was released on June 26, 2020, through 1501 Certified Entertainment and 300 Entertainment, as the album's lead single. Built around a sample of "Boyz-n-the-Hood" by Eazy-E and featuring electric guitar and 808 drums, it is a hip hop song with braggadocious lyrics.

The song received widespread critical acclaim from music critics, some of whom praised it for repurposing what they believed to be misogynoir in "Boyz-n-the-Hood" into an anthem for women. "Girls in the Hood" peaked at number 28 on the US Billboard Hot 100 chart, and at number 3 on the Deutsche Black Charts. It was certified triple platinum in the United States by the Recording Industry of America (RIAA). A lyric video for the song was released on June 26, 2020. To promote the song, Megan Thee Stallion performed it at the BET Awards 2020 and as part of a virtual concert for Tidal that same year.

== Background and composition ==
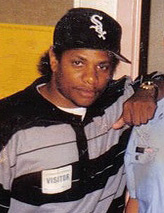
"Girls in the Hood" samples the 1987 gangsta rap song "Boyz-n-the-Hood" by American rapper Eazy-E (pictured)

The release date of "Girls in the Hood" was announced on June 24, 2020, as June 26 via Megan Thee Stallion's social media accounts. On June 26, 2020, prior to the song's official release, Megan Thee Stallion teased the song by posting a video clip to Instagram of her twerking in a sundress. After the song was teased, American rapper Reemarkable, daughter of Eazy-E, spoke out regarding Megan Thee Stallion sampling "Boyz-n-the-Hood" since, according to her, she and his other children were barred from allowing recreation or sampling of his music.

The song was released on June 26, 2020, as the lead single for Good News. It was written by Megan Thee Stallion, Bobby Sessions, Ice Cube, Dr. Dre, Eazy-E, Ilyah Fraser, and Scott Storch, while produced by IllaDaProducer and Storch. The cover for the single features Megan Thee Stallion in a pink paisley halter top with a fuzzy hood and hoop earrings, standing in front of a pink paisley background. Merchandise for the song was created by black female artists; Megan Thee Stallion boasted that she "can't wait for y'all to see it". A lyric video for "Girls in the Hood" was released on June 26, 2020, and features a "colorful" compilation of pictures, videos, and animations of Megan Thee Stallion, including the rapper flexing her body. On TikTok, a clip of US Vice President (VP) Kamala Harris saying, "Mister Vice president, I'm speaking," to former VP Mike Pence during the 2020 United States VP debate, set to "Girls in the Hood", became a trend in October 2020. Another trend on TikTok featuring the song with a clip of Megan Thee Stallion saying, "I can't talk right now, I'm doing hot girl shit," in which users showed themselves doing mundane tasks, was created by makeup artist Chelsea Uchenna in November 2020. It became popular in early 2021.

"Girls in the Hood"
A 21-second clip from the chorus of "Girls in the Hood", in which Megan Thee Stallion raps over a sample of "Boyz-n-the-Hood".

"Girls in the Hood" heavily samples Eazy-E's 1987 song "Boyz-n-the-Hood", putting a "modern", "feminist" spin on it. Its instrumental includes electric guitar and 808 drums. Lyrically, the song mainly consists of "defiant", braggadocious one-liners, including its opening lyrics, "Fuck being good, I'm a bad bitch/I'm sick of motherfuckers trying tell me how to live". Kyann-Sian Williams of NME surmised that the lyrics are from the perspective of Megan Thee Stallion's pimp alter ego Tina Snow. Several lyrics were directly inspired by Eazy-E's original lyrics. Megan Thee Stallion also references her haters on Instagram, her love of anime, and the Japanese manga series Naruto in the song. Jessica McKinney of Complex described the rapper's flow on the song as "aggressive", "relentless", and "reminiscent of ... the freestyles that put her on the map in the early stages of her career". Clover Hope of W described the song as "vigorously immodest".

== Critical reception ==
"Girls in the Hood" was met with moderate praise from music critics. Pitchfork gave "Girls in the Hood" the title of "Best New Track", with Sheldon Pearce remarking that the song repurposes the misogynoir of "Boyz-n-the-Hood" "for those it disenfranchised", adding, "It feels like Megan is leading a revolt of the women mistreated in rap songs." British GQ's Olive Pometsey similarly commented on the connection to the misogynoir of the original, writing that it "hasn't aged well post-MeToo", and that, with "Girls in the Hood", "Megan flipped the switch and turned it into a song that gives power back to women". For All Songs Considered, NPR's Sidney Madden also wrote about the misogynoir in "Boyz-n-the-Hood" and praised Megan for using "venomous, crushing one-liners" to "stomp out and shrivel up every last shred of male ego frailty". MusicOMH's Ben Devlin stated that "Girls in the Hood" "continu[ed] a trend of [Megan Thee Stallion] reappropriating male-centric rap songs that started with Suga's B.I.T.C.H". Justin Curto of Vulture said that the rapper switched "the misogynistic violence of "Boyz-n-the-Hood" by Eazy-E", turning it "into one of her strongest empowerment anthems yet".

Williams gave the song a rating of four out of five stars, calling the song a "banger" with "cocksure attitude" and writing, "The larger-than-life braggadocio is what we all love Megan for, and it's in abundance on this single." Chuck Arnold of the New York Post named "Girls in the Hood" the number one "song of the summer", dubbing it a "rock-edged banger". Billboard's Jason Lipshutz called the song "a distinctive anthem for [Megan Thee Stallion] and for women everywhere" and "a fresh showcase for her skills", calling her wordplay "top-notch" and her punchlines "unexpected". Consequence's Nina Corcoran wrote that the song's "rapid-fire verses" are a "straight-up vocal flex", referring to it as "memorable". Vulture's Craig Jenkins called Megan Thee Stallion's rapping on the song "immaculate", writing that, on the song, "Meg's unique character and interests shine through". Fred Thomas of AllMusic stated that the song had the "same direct impact" of "Boyz-n-the-Hood". Devlin of MusicOMH called the song "well-judged" and regarded her "flexing" on the track as "effortless and masterful". Complex Australia wrote that the song had "the reckless, cocky attitude that made 'Boyz-N-The-Hood' timeless", and considered the song's message "unflinchingly progressive, positive and quintessentially 2020". BrooklynVegan's Andrew Sacher wrote that the song "does not disappoint one bit". Clash's Robin Murray called the track an "emphatic close" on the album. For Teen Vogue, Asia Milia Ware named "Girls in the Hood" one of the best songs of 2020.

For Consequence, Candace McDuffie wrote that, although "Girls in the Hood" was an "exciting opportunity", the chorus of "Boyz-n-the-Hood" was not interpolated enough "for its potency to stick". Kyle Kohner of Exclaim! called the song "refreshing" in a review of Good News, but added that it and "Savage Remix felt "ultimately unnecessary" on the album due to their being released "what seems like ages ago". BuzzFeed News's Niela Orr stated that the song lacked a "middle ground" between "the lofty idealism that [Megan Thee Stallion has] come to stand for and the escapism that's fueled her so far". In a ranking of the 17 songs on Good News, Carl Lamarre of Billboard ranked the song 15th, saying that the song "is placed at a point in which Meg begins losing steam".

== Commercial performance ==
"Girls in the Hood" peaked at number 28 on the Billboard Hot 100, at number 9 on the Rolling Stone Top 100, at number 90 on the Canadian Hot 100, and at number 3 on the Deutsche Black Charts. It was certified triple platinum in the United States by the Recording Industry of America (RIAA).

== Promotion ==
Megan Thee Stallion gave her debut performance of the song at the BET Awards 2020 on June 28, 2020, in a medley with "Savage (Remix)". The pretaped performance was directed and choreographed by Megan Thee Stallion's frequent creative collaborator JaQuel Knight. Inspired by the Mad Max film series, it took place in a desert setting and showed the rapper in feathers and black leather, accompanied by off-road vehicles and "warrior women". It was staged with the help of a taskforce that ensured safety measures for the COVID-19 pandemic were followed.

The performance was included on a list of the best music videos made in lockdown during the pandemic by Mark Savage of BBC News, who remarked that Megan Thee Stallion "stole the show". It was also named the third best music video of June 2020 by Pitchfork's Eric Torres, who wrote, "In under five minutes, she sets the bar for any virtual awards show performances that dare follow," also regarding it as the best performance of the night. Pometsey of British GQ commented that the performance "channelled all of the fury of Mad Max, but with much more attitude and better choreography"; Esquire's Gabrielle Bruney identified it as "one of the most fun moments of the night". Harper's Bazaar's Lauren Michele Jackson wrote that it was "as sleek as any music video", while Zach Seemayer of Entertainment Tonight called the video's setting "one of the best postapocalyptic settings in any music video in recent memory". During Megan Thee Stallion's first virtual live concert on August 29, 2020, which was streamed on Tidal, she performed the song.

== Credits and personnel ==
Credits adapted from Tidal.

- Megan Thee Stallion – vocals, songwriting
- IllaDaProducer – production, songwriting
- Scott Storch – production, songwriting
- Bobby Sessions – songwriting
- Dr. Dre – songwriting
- Eazy-E – songwriting
- Ice Cube – songwriting
- Shawn "Source" Jarrett – engineering
- Jaycen Joshua – mixing
- Colin Leonard – mastering

== Charts ==
=== Weekly charts ===
Weekly chart performance for "Girls in the Hood"
Chart (2020)	Peak position
Canada Hot 100 (Billboard)	90
Germany (Deutsche Black Charts)	3
Global 200 (Billboard)	129
New Zealand Hot Singles (RMNZ)	10
US Billboard Hot 100	28
US Hot R&B/Hip-Hop Songs (Billboard)	13
US R&B/Hip-Hop Airplay (Billboard)	5
US Rhythmic Airplay (Billboard)	15
US Rolling Stone Top 100	9

=== Year-end charts ===
2020 year-end chart performance for "Girls in the Hood"
Chart (2020)	Position
US Hot R&B/Hip-Hop Songs (Billboard)	54

== Certifications ==
Certifications for "Girls in the Hood"
Region	Certification	Certified units/sales
New Zealand (RMNZ)	Gold	15,000^{‡}
United Kingdom (BPI)	Silver	200,000^{‡}
United States (RIAA)	3× Platinum	3,000,000^{‡}
^{‡} Sales+streaming figures based on certification alone.

== Release history ==
Release history for "Girls in the Hood"
Region	Date	Format(s)	Label(s)	Ref.
Various	June 26, 2020	Digital download; streaming	1501 Certified; 300	

== See also ==
- Anime and hip-hop
- Elliot Eliantte
