= Lonely Child =

Lonely Child may refer to:

- "Lonely Child", a 2014 song by Christina Perri from Head or Heart
- "Lonely Child", a 2019 song by YoungBoy Never Broke Again from AI YoungBoy 2
