= Buddah Bless =

American record producer (born 1992)

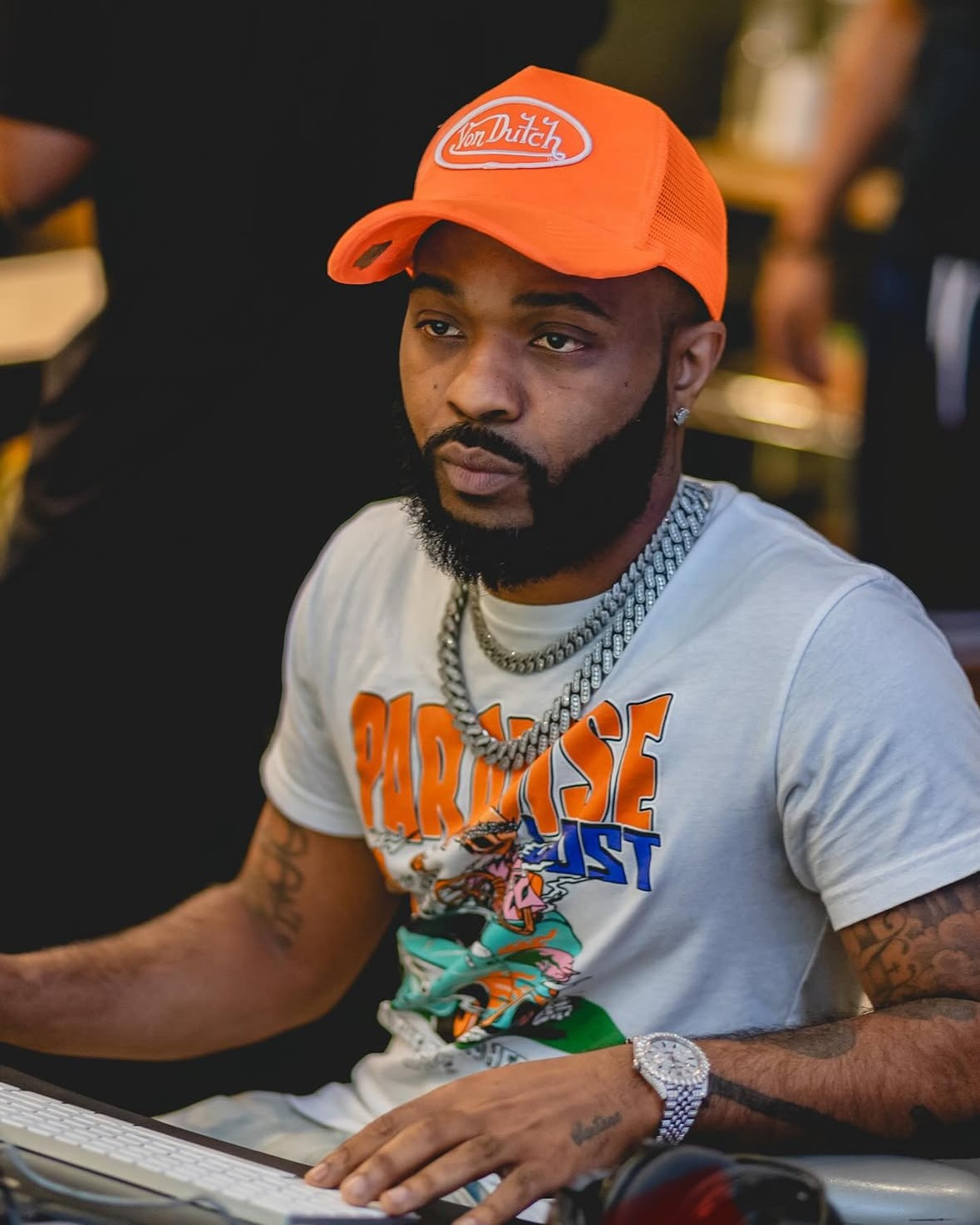
- Buddah Bless in 2025

Background information
- Also known as: Buddah Bless This Beat; Buddah; Budda; Budda Beats
- Born: Tyron Buddah Douglas Sr. February 8, 1992 (age 34); Long Island, New York, U.S.
- Origin: Atlanta, Georgia, U.S.
- Occupations: Record producer; songwriter; rapper (former)
- Years active: 2011–present
- Label: Sony/ATV

Tyron Buddah Douglas Sr. (born February 8, 1992), known professionally as Buddah Bless, is an American record producer, songwriter, and former rapper. He has been credited on several commercially successful singles in hip hop music, namely "Big Amount" by 2 Chainz featuring Drake, "Make No Sense" by YoungBoy Never Broke Again, "Out West" by JackBoys, Travis Scott, and Young Thug, and "Heat" by Chris Brown featuring Gunna.

His works can be identified by his producer tag, "Buddah Bless this beat".

== Early life ==
Douglas was born in Long Island, New York, on February 8, 1992. He was raised in Atlanta, Georgia. He is 1 of 5 children (his siblings are: Tracy Douglas, Kelley Douglas, Tychaune Douglas, and Kiana Randolph). His mother, Cheryl Dessaure, was a registered nurse and his father, Albie Douglas, was a photographer and graphic designer. Douglas began his music life in church. He used to play piano alongside his brother who played the drums. One Thanksgiving he saw his uncle making beats. With the combination of those things his music career began.

== Career ==
Douglas has produced hit singles by artists such as Migos, Chris Brown, Travis Scott, and more.

=== Artistry ===
Douglas has described his style as "your grandmother's music mixed with Gucci Mane".

== Production discography ==
=== Charted songs ===
Title	Year	Peak chart positions			Album
Title	Year	US	US R&B/HH	CAN	Album
"Big Amount" (2 Chainz featuring Drake)	2016	— (Note: "Big Amount" did not chart on the Billboard Hot 100, but did peak at number nine on the Bubbling Under Hot 100 chart.)	44	—	Daniel Son; Necklace Don
"Call Casting" (Migos)	2017	62	25	65	Culture
"Modern Slavery" (Huncho Jack)	2017	68	29	59	Huncho Jack, Jack Huncho
"Saint Laurent Mask" (Huncho Jack)	2017	—	—	93	Huncho Jack, Jack Huncho
"Supastars" (Migos)	2018	53	27	51	Culture II
"BBO (Bad Bitches Only)" (Migos featuring 21 Savage)	2018	48	24	52	Culture II
"Pass Out" (Quavo featuring 21 Savage)	2018	61	29	56	Quavo Huncho
"Heat" (Chris Brown featuring Gunna)	2019	36	15	—	Indigo
"Make No Sense" (YoungBoy Never Broke Again)	2020	57	27	—	AI YoungBoy 2
"Out West" (JackBoys and Travis Scott featuring Young Thug)	2020	38	15	29	JackBoys
"Need It" (Migos featuring YoungBoy Never Broke Again)	2020	62	28	—	Culture III
"Snitching" (Pop Smoke featuring Quavo and Future)	2020	54	30	51	Shoot for the Stars, Aim for the Moon
"Don't Stop" (Megan Thee Stallion featuring Young Thug)	2020	30	14	97	Good News
"Shots Fired" (Megan Thee Stallion)	2020	82	25	—	Good News
"Million Dollar Play" (Future and Lil Uzi Vert)		67	25	—	Pluto x Baby Pluto
"Ex for a Reason" (Summer Walker and JT of City Girls)	2021	33	12	75	Still Over It
