= Griddy =

Break dance move

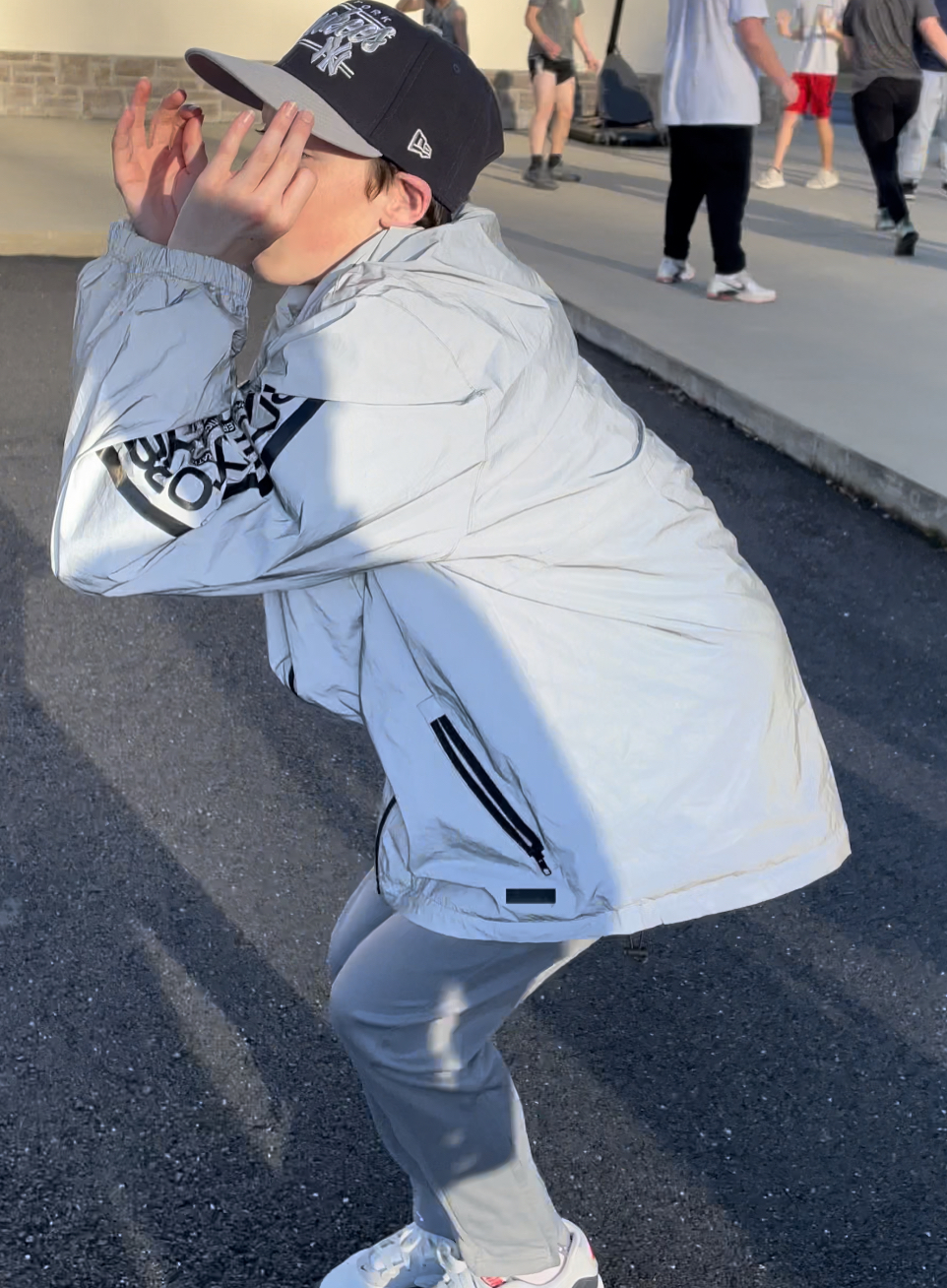
A teenager 'throwing his B's' while doing the Griddy dance

The Griddy is a dance move in which a person alternatingly taps their heels, either in place or while walking, while swinging their arms back and forth. Created by high school footballer Allen Davis in 2018, his dance went viral on TikTok in 2019. Minnesota Vikings wide receiver Justin Jefferson has added "throw[ing] your B's" to the dance; this move looks similar to forming "ok" symbols around the eyes.

== Origins ==
The name of the dance is taken from the nickname of its creator, Allen "Griddy" Davis. As a high school football player, Davis was inspired by the Nae Nae to make his own dance. Davis created The Griddy and uploaded videos to YouTube showing it off. He introduced the dance to one of his best friends and teammates, future Cincinnati Bengals wide receiver Ja'Marr Chase. When Chase began playing football for LSU, he showed it to fellow wide receiver Justin Jefferson. After performing The Griddy at collegiate level games, Chase and Jefferson brought the dance to the NFL, bringing it popularity among players, celebrities, and fans.

== Popularity ==
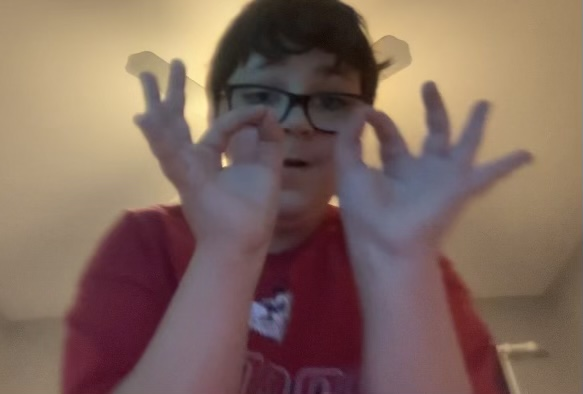
An adolescent "throwing his B's"

- In 2020, a song titled "Right Foot Creep" by YoungBoy Never Broke Again was released, and it was synced up with the dance and used on TikTok.
- In 2021, the dance was featured as an emote in Fortnite.
- During the 2022 Pro Bowl, then New England Patriots quarterback Mac Jones did The Griddy after a “just for fun” 80 yard rushing touchdown that did not count, marking what many consider to be the final Pro Bowl highlight following the league’s ending of the Pro Bowl game.
- In 2022, a collaboration between Cinnamon Toast Crunch and Jefferson led to the release of Griddy Toast Crunch, a limited edition run of Cinnamon Toast Crunch cereal, including Jefferson’s likeness on the box. The boxes were priced at $50, selling out in 90 minutes.
- In 2022, American soccer player Christian Pulisic did The Griddy after scoring in the 2022 UEFA Champions League for Chelsea, which later became a celebration in FIFA 23.
- Jesse Lingard celebrated scoring for Nottingham Forest against Tottenham Hotspur on November 9, 2022.
- On January 1, 2023, Green Bay Packers cornerback Jaire Alexander did the Griddy in front of Justin Jefferson after breaking up a pass intended for the Vikings wide receiver.
- In July 2023, Lisa Mesi, a high school principal, was fired after denying a graduate her diploma after the graduate did the Griddy on stage. Alongside being fired, Mesi also received death threats following the news going viral online.
- In September 2023, Manchester City winger Jérémy Doku celebrated by doing the Griddy after he scored the equaliser against West Ham. He did it again after he scored the third goal during a Champions League match against RB Leipzig, and Italian player Moise Kean did it in Juventus versus Hellas Verona.
- On February 10, 2024, Jake Walman while playing for the Detroit Red Wings did the Griddy after scoring an overtime shootout winner against the Vancouver Canucks.
- On December 9, 2024, Ja'Marr Chase did the Griddy after scoring his first touchdown during the Cincinnati Bengals Monday Night Football win against the Dallas Cowboys, fulfilling a promise he made to Brixton Wood, a young survivor of leukemia, to do the dance if he scored in the game. Wood was in attendance at the game and who Chase met through the Make-A-Wish Foundation.
- On December 28, 2024, Joe Burrow did the Griddy after running for a touchdown in the fourth quarter in the Cincinnati Bengals win against the Denver Broncos.
- On 19 January 2025, Carlos Baleba did The Griddy in the tunnel of Old Trafford after helping his team to beat Manchester United by 1-3.
- On 4 May 2025, Oscar Piastri did the Griddy after winning the Miami Grand Prix. He revealed that he had made a bet with Jefferson to do the Griddy if he won the race.
