= My Window =

2020 song by YoungBoy Never Broke Again featuring Lil Wayne

Song by YoungBoy Never Broke Again featuring Lil Wayne

from the album Top
- Released: September 11, 2020
- Length: 3:12
- Label: Never Broke Again; Atlantic; Artist
- Songwriters: Kentrell Gaulden; Dwayne Carter Jr.
- Producers: Smash David; TenRoc

Audio video
- "My Window" on YouTube

"My Window" is a song by American rapper YoungBoy Never Broke Again featuring Lil Wayne, released on September 11, 2020 as the seventh track from YoungBoy's second studio album, Top. Critics were particularly fond of Lil Wayne's verse.

== Composition ==
"My Window" is an "emotionally rich" record. The song's title refers to the rappers being "on full alert as they watch out for enemies". Lyrically, YoungBoy details his paranoia about his living conditions, with Lil Wayne's verse relating to it too.

== Critical reception ==
Consequence of Sound's Okla Jones named the song "one of the project's high points", praising the chemistry between the two artists as "powerful, in part due to the strong Louisiana connection that they share". Jones stated that "Wayne shows up in rare form here as well, demonstrating why he is considered one of the best to ever touch a microphone". Tom Breihan of Stereogum also complimented Wayne for bringing his "A-game". Listing it among the best releases of the week, Complex's Jessica McKinney noted the track for being emotionally driven and said Wayne delivers a "paranoid, quick-fire verse". Similarly, Alex Zidel of HotNewHipHop said "Wayne complements the track well, bringing lyrical wordplay to the Smash David production". Zidel called the track a "lyrical storm". Imogen Lawlor of Vinyl Chapters highlighted the song as one of the tracks off Top "that demonstrates the depth of NBA YoungBoy's hip hop knowledge", "conveyed overtly through lyrics such as "I be where it's grimy, steady keepin' it real". Billboard's Jason Lipshutz opined: "for an artist still lacking a crossover hit, 'My Window,' [...] might just be it".

== Charts ==
Chart (2020)	Peak position
New Zealand Hot Singles (RMNZ)	21
US Billboard Hot 100	35
US Hot R&B/Hip-Hop Songs (Billboard)	14
US Rolling Stone Top 100	10

== Certifications ==
Region	Certification	Certified units/sales
United States (RIAA)	Platinum	1,000,000^{‡}
^{‡} Sales+streaming figures based on certification alone.
