= Make No Sense =

2019 single by YoungBoy Never Broke Again

Single by YoungBoy Never Broke Again

from the album AI YoungBoy 2
- Released: January 14, 2020
- Genre: Hip hop
- Length: 2:28
- Label: Never Broke Again; Atlantic
- Songwriters: Kentrell Gaulden; Tyron Douglas
- Producer: Buddah Bless

YoungBoy Never Broke Again singles chronology
"Dirty Iyanna" (2019)	"Make No Sense" (2020)	"Trillionaire" (2020)

Music video
- "Make No Sense" on YouTube

"Make No Sense" is a song by American rapper YoungBoy Never Broke Again. It was sent to urban contemporary radio on January 14, 2020 as the third single from his twelfth mixtape AI YoungBoy 2 (2019). It was produced by Buddah Bless.

== Background and composition ==
YoungBoy first previewed the song on an Instagram story in January 2019; the song was also previous titled as "Tina Turner". The first line of the chorus ("I feel like I'm Gucci Mane in 2006") is a reference to when a murder charge against Mane was dropped in 2006. YoungBoy sings about the money he has earned, and how some men are pretending to have money or respect him. He also compares jewelry to the price of narcotics and talks about still keeping his thug persona.

== Music video ==
The music video was released on January 13, 2020.

== Charts ==
=== Weekly charts ===
Chart (2019–20)	Peak position
US Billboard Hot 100	57
US Hot R&B/Hip-Hop Songs (Billboard)	27
US Rhythmic Airplay (Billboard)	37

=== Year-end charts ===
Chart (2020)	Position
US Hot R&B/Hip-Hop Songs (Billboard)	72

== Certifications ==
Region	Certification	Certified units/sales
New Zealand (RMNZ)	Platinum	30,000^{‡}
United Kingdom (BPI)	Silver	200,000^{‡}
United States (RIAA)	2× Platinum	2,000,000^{‡}
^{‡} Sales+streaming figures based on certification alone.
