= All In (YoungBoy Never Broke Again song) =

2020 single by YoungBoy Never Broke Again

Single by YoungBoy Never Broke Again

from the album Top
- Released: July 25, 2020
- Length: 2:36
- Label: Never Broke Again; Atlantic; Artist
- Songwriters: Kentrell Gaulden; Luke Clay; Michael O'Brien; Brandon Russell
- Producers: Yung Lan; LC; 12Hunna; BJ Beatz

YoungBoy Never Broke Again singles chronology
"One Shot" (2020)	"All In" (2020)	"Kacey Talk" (2020)

Music video
- "All In" on YouTube

"All In" is a song by American rapper YoungBoy Never Broke Again, released on July 25, 2020, as the lead single from his second studio album, Top. The song finds YoungBoy opening up about various aspects of his life and career struggles.

== Composition ==
Over the LC guitar-tinged & Bj Beatz production, YoungBoy showcases his "vulnerable" side, touching on his childhood and growing up without his father, who was incarcerated. He also delves into his own drug use, while delivering "introspective bars" about his rough background and how it affected his professional relationships. He further details his skepticism about others, stemming from having fame and wealth; questioning "the motives of the people who are close to him". He also addresses his relationship with the media, and his heartbreak and loss.

== Critical reception ==
Revolt's Jon Powell opined that, "As with many other releases, YoungBoy uses the music to pour his heart out about his life and struggles, something that many of his fans can relate to". Aron A. of HotNewHipHop said he delivers "honesty in its totality". Okla Jones of Consequence of Sound said the song, along with the album tracks "Cross Roads" and "Murder Business", "are all solid tracks, but the repeated words of violence, crime, and mistrust can sometimes show a lack of creativity — or reluctance to branch out — on YoungBoy's part".

== Music video ==
The song was released with an accompanying Rich Porter-directed video that shows YoungBoy and his crew in various areas in his neighborhood. The video also sees YoungBoy walking while old tweets of his flash on the screen. As with many of his other videos, "it keeps with the pattern of filming YoungBoy in his natural element", omitting any special effects.

== Charts ==
Chart (2020)	Peak position
US Billboard Hot 100	67
US Hot R&B/Hip-Hop Songs (Billboard)	23
US Rolling Stone Top 100	26

== Certifications ==
Region	Certification	Certified units/sales
United States (RIAA)	3× Platinum	3,000,000^{‡}
^{‡} Sales+streaming figures based on certification alone.
