= Outside Today =

2018 single by YoungBoy Never Broke Again

Single by YoungBoy Never Broke Again

from the album Until Death Call My Name
- Released: January 6, 2018
- Recorded: 2017
- Length: 2:08
- Label: Never Broke Again; Atlantic
- Songwriters: Kentrell Gaulden; Dyllan McKinney
- Producer: DMacTooBangin

YoungBoy Never Broke Again singles chronology
"No Smoke" (2017)	"Outside Today" (2018)	"Diamond Teeth Samurai" (2018)

Music video
- "Outside Today" on YouTube

"Outside Today" is a song by American rapper YoungBoy Never Broke Again, released as the lead single from his debut album Until Death Call My Name. The song, produced by DMacTooBangin, was released on January 6, 2018, along with its music video. It peaked at number 31 on the Billboard Hot 100, becoming NBA YoungBoy's highest-charting song until the release of "Bandit" with Juice WRLD, which peaked in the top 10 in October 2019.

== Music video ==
The song's music video features NBA YoungBoy staying inside of his home and avoiding a swarm of paparazzi with his then-girlfriend Jania, crew, and Birdman.

== Charts ==
=== Weekly charts ===
Chart (2018)	Peak position
US Billboard Hot 100	31
US Hot R&B/Hip-Hop Songs (Billboard)	18

=== Year-end charts ===
Chart (2018)	Position
US Billboard Hot 100	91
US Hot R&B/Hip-Hop Songs (Billboard)	48

== Certifications ==
Region	Certification	Certified units/sales
New Zealand (RMNZ)	Platinum	30,000^{‡}
United States (RIAA)	4× Platinum	4,000,000^{‡}
^{‡} Sales+streaming figures based on certification alone.
