= Drug Addiction (song) =

2020 song by YoungBoy Never Broke Again

Song by YoungBoy Never Broke Again

from the album Top
- Released: September 11, 2020
- Length: 2:44
- Label: Never Broke Again; Atlantic
- Songwriters: Kentrell Gaulden; Benjamin Hubble; Christoffer Buchardt Marcussen
- Producers: LayZBeats; Palaze

Lyric video
- "Drug Addiction" on YouTube

"Drug Addiction" is a song by American rapper YoungBoy Never Broke Again, released on September 11, 2020, as the introductory track from his second studio album, Top. The slow trap beat sees YoungBoy speak about his life struggles and his come up.

== Critical reception ==
AllMusic's Fred Thomas noted that "the album starts strong with the pleading melodic autotune." He continues to note that "it's one of several songs where YoungBoy rides plaintive instrumentals with sung/rapped bars about emotional pain and times of struggle."

== Charts ==
Chart (2020)	Peak position
Global 200 (Billboard)	73
US Billboard Hot 100	44
US Hot R&B/Hip-Hop Songs (Billboard)	17

== Certifications ==
Region	Certification	Certified units/sales
United States (RIAA)	Platinum	1,000,000^{‡}
^{‡} Sales+streaming figures based on certification alone.
