= Lonely Child (song) =

2019 song by YoungBoy Never Broke Again

Song by YoungBoy Never Broke Again

from the album AI YoungBoy 2
- Released: October 11, 2019
- Length: 3:37
- Label: Never Broke Again; Artist Partner Group; Atlantic
- Songwriters: Kentrell Gaulden; David McDowell; Tahj Javal Vaughn; Thomas Horton
- Producers: Dmac; Tahj Money; TnTXD

Audio video
- "Lonely Child" on YouTube

"Lonely Child" is a song by American rapper YoungBoy Never Broke Again, released on October 11, 2019, as the eleventh track from YoungBoy's twelfth mixtape, AI YoungBoy 2. The low tempo trap beat provides the correct melody for YoungBoy to vocalize his feelings regarding his pain from the death of his friend Lil Dave to the hurt from not being able to see his son Kacey to the resentment he feels towards the mother of Kacey, his ex-girlfriend, Jania Bania.

== Background ==
The song was first released on YouTube and SoundCloud on October 9, 2019, as a surprise release from YoungBoy, however it was re-released through Never Broke Again, Artist Partner Group and Atlantic Records on October 11, 2019, to appear on all digital streaming platforms.

== Crtitical reception ==
On October 11, 2019, "Lonely Child" appeared as Pitchfork's "new rap song of the day." Pierre noted that the track "[doubles] down on the crooning that has made him an online sensation" and that he is "rap's most troubled superstar."

== Charts ==
Chart (2019)	Peak position
US Billboard Hot 100	44
US Hot R&B/Hip-Hop Songs (Billboard)	22

== Certifications ==
Region	Certification	Certified units/sales
United States (RIAA)	Platinum	1,000,000^{‡}
^{‡} Sales+streaming figures based on certification alone.
