= Self Control (YoungBoy Never Broke Again song) =

2019 single by YoungBoy Never Broke Again

Single by YoungBoy Never Broke Again

from the album AI YoungBoy 2
- Released: September 6, 2019
- Genre: Hip hop
- Length: 3:05
- Label: Never Broke Again; Atlantic
- Songwriters: Kentrell Gaulden; Alex Petit; Damion Williams; Tevin Revell
- Producers: CashMoneyAP; DJ Swift; Drum Dummie

YoungBoy Never Broke Again singles chronology
"Diamond Teeth Samurai" (2018)	"Self Control" (2019)	"Slime Mentality" (2019)

Music video
- "Self Control" on YouTube

"Self Control" is a song by American rapper YoungBoy Never Broke Again, released on September 6, 2019, as the lead single from his twelfth mixtape AI YoungBoy 2 (2019).

== Composition ==
The song finds YoungBoy sing-rapping in a melodic flow and reflecting on his past struggles in life, including dealing with the losses of loved ones and temptations of substance abuse, and how they have shaped his present circumstances.

== Music video ==
The music video was released on September 5, 2019. It opens up with NBA YoungBoy being released from prison and embracing family and friends; a reference to his release from East Baton Rouge Parish Prison in August 2019. He documents the private moments he spent with his family and girlfriend following his release.

== Charts ==
Chart (2019)	Peak position
US Billboard Hot 100	50
US Hot R&B/Hip-Hop Songs (Billboard)	24

== Certifications ==
Region	Certification	Certified units/sales
United States (RIAA)	2× Platinum	2,000,000^{‡}
^{‡} Sales+streaming figures based on certification alone.
