= Dead Trollz =

2020 song by YoungBoy Never Broke Again

Song by YoungBoy Never Broke Again

from the album Top
- Released: September 11, 2020
- Length: 3:29
- Label: Never Broke Again; Atlantic; Artist
- Songwriters: Gaulden; Jarrian Thompson; Lukas Payne; Sterling Reynolds
- Producers: PlayboyXO; LondnBlue; Karltin Bankz

Music video
- "Dead Trollz" on YouTube

"Dead Trollz" is a song by American rapper YoungBoy Never Broke Again, released on September 11, 2020, as the eleventh track from his second studio album, Top. An aggressive track, it sees YoungBoy taking aim at his enemies, who he deems to be trolls.

== Background ==
The song was first teased by YoungBoy via his Instagram. The track was noted for containing the rapper's signature aggression and "unadulterated violence". It drew comparisons to Lil Wayne's sound, while it was also noted for having a similar title to "Trollz" by 6ix9ine and Nicki Minaj.

== Critical reception ==
HotNewHipHop's Aron A. deemed the "menacing" track a highlight off Top: "Filled with aggression and Southern heat, NBA Youngboy comes out the gate swinging on this one and perhaps takes aim at one of the most famous trolls of all". Brandon Caldwell of HipHopDX noted YoungBoy's comparisons to Lil Wayne on the track, and how he "rattled off rhymes about making sure his enemies know he ordered their deaths".

== Music video ==
The song's official video premiered on the same day as the album. It was directed by YoungBoy's frequent collaborater, Rich Porter, and FlyGuyNick. The visual is "filled with guns and plenty of high energy", intertwined with clips of YoungBoy's friends flashing red beams, while they make threats at unidentified enemies. Hypebeast's Sophie Caraan said the track's "aggressive energy" is greatly matched in the "bewildering" visual.

== Charts ==
Chart (2020)	Peak position
US Billboard Hot 100	72
US Hot R&B/Hip-Hop Songs (Billboard)	26
US Rolling Stone Top 100	46

== Certifications ==
Region	Certification	Certified units/sales
United States (RIAA)	Gold	500,000^{‡}
^{‡} Sales+streaming figures based on certification alone.
