= Shots Fired (song) =

2020 song by Megan Thee Stallion

Song by Megan Thee Stallion

from the album Good News
- Released: November 20, 2020
- Genre: Hip hop
- Length: 2:50
- Label: 1501 Certified; 300
- Composers: Tyron Douglas; Herb Magidson; Allie Wrubel
- Lyricist: Megan Pete
- Producer: Buddah Bless

"Shots Fired" is a song by American rapper and songwriter Megan Thee Stallion. It was released as the first track from Megan's debut studio album, Good News, on November 20, 2020. A diss track, the song recounts Megan's 2020 shooting incident, mocking the shooter, rapper Tory Lanez. The song includes a sample of the Notorious B.I.G.'s 1995 track "Who Shot Ya?".

"Shots Fired" was universally lauded by critics, who praised Megan's response to Lanez's 2020 album Daystar, which also referenced the shooting.

== Background ==
On July 15, 2020, internet tabloid TMZ posted video footage appearing to show an injured Megan Thee Stallion in an incident involving the Los Angeles Police Department (LAPD). After initial reports that the injury had been caused by broken glass on the floor of the car in which she was riding, Megan issued a statement clarifying that she "suffered gunshot wounds, as a result of a crime that was committed against me and done with the intention to physically harm me". The following month, Megan named Tory Lanez as her shooter, and said that she did not immediately name him out of fear of the police, especially in light of the murder of George Floyd and subsequent protests. Megan later revealed that Lanez and his team offered her money in exchange for silence on the matter.

On September 25, 2020, Lanez released his fifth studio album, Daystar, in which he repeatedly denied shooting Megan. Daystar received widespread criticism from music journalists, many of whom refused to review the album. Andre Gee of Complex referred to the album as "a project too contemptible to be evaluated on any musical scale", while Chris Murphy of Vulture released a headline saying, "For the Love of God, Do Not Listen to Tory Lanez's Album DAYSTAR". Fellow rapper Rick Ross took to social media to rebuke Lanez for his album, saying "That ain't how you address the accusations you facing with the sister. That was a poor choice, homie. You ain't getting no money with that shit". Highsnobiety announced that they would refuse to cover Lanez after he dropped "the most toxic album of the year".

== Writing and composition ==
"Shots Fired" is a rap track, that samples The Notorious B.I.G.'s 1995 hip hop track "Who Shot Ya?" The track was written by Megan (under her birth name of Megan Pete), Buddah Bless (under his birth name of Tyron Douglas), Herb Magidson, and Allie Wrubel, and was produced by Bless. The track references specific elements of the shooting, including the pellet and .22 caliber with which she was shot, her decision not to tell the police, and the money she and her friend were offered in exchange for their silence. Megan chooses never to name the subject of the track in the song, but instead makes a reference to the shooting of Breonna Taylor.

== Release ==
Megan Thee Stallion announced the name and release date of her debut studio album, Good News on November 12, 2020. On November 17, three days before the album release, Megan released the album's track list, with "Shots Fired" as the first track. This led to media and fan speculation that the song would address the Lanez incident. Good News was released on November 20, 2020.

Megan revealed in an interview with WQHT Hot 97 that the song was "ready to go the next day" after being shot, but that she held off on releasing the song until she decided that, "at the end of the day, I just can't keep letting people walk all over me". In a subsequent interview with Radio.com, Megan said that she had no interest in continuing to address the incident, and that she felt "like I said enough" on "Shots Fired".

== Reception ==
"Shots Fired" was released to wide acclaim from music critics, who praised Megan's response to the shooting incident. Justin Curto of Vulture said that the song is "a perfect reminder [...] that [Megan is] past the point of having to prove herself, or anything, to anyone", and called it "a diss track in line with a long lineage of greats". Teen Vogue said that the track "feels cathartic in allowing her to take the space to fully tell her side of the story". Jon Blistein of Rolling Stone praised "Shots Fired" as "catty and cutting, and most vicious of all, backed up by the evidence", and compared the song to Noname's "Song 33", a diss track against J. Cole.

Writing for NME, Kyann-Sian Williams referred to "Shots Fired" as "a signal that Megan is not messing around", and that the song "suggests she's done with having her kindness taken for weakness". Steffanee Wang of Nylon said that "Megan's storytelling ability, clear-eyed delivery, and general charisma as a rapper as she tells her side of the story take center stage", and that "Megan's got the last word" between her and Lanez. In a review for Stereogum, Tom Breihan said that Megan "just atomizes this motherfucker, clowning him for everything from his shallow social-media self-aggrandizement to his choice of weaponry".

"Shots Fired" also had a strong fan and commercial showing, with many Twitter users praising the track upon its release. In the United States, "Shots Fired" debuted at number 82 on the Billboard Hot 100, and at number 23 on the Billboard Hot Rap Songs chart. Elsewhere, the song spent one week at number 25 on the Recorded Music NZ charts, and entered the Billboard Global 200 at number 162.

== Personnel ==
- Megan Thee Stallion – singer, songwriter
- Buddah Bless – producer, songwriter
- Herb Magidson – songwriter
- Allie Wrubel – songwriter
- Shawn "Source" Jarrett – recording engineer
- Mike Dean – mixing engineer, mastering
- Sage Skolfield – assistant mixer
- Sean Solymar – assistant mixer
- Jonah Rappaport – A&R administration
- Selim Bouab – A&R direction

Credits adapted from Tidal.

== Charts ==
Chart performance for "Shots Fired"
Chart (2020–2021)	Peak position
Global 200 (Billboard)	162
New Zealand (Recorded Music NZ)	25
US Billboard Hot 100	82
US Hot Rap Songs (Billboard)	23

== See also ==
- Violence against women
