= Good News (Megan Thee Stallion album) =

2020 studio album by Megan Thee Stallion

Studio album by Megan Thee Stallion
- Released: November 20, 2020
- Genre: Hip-hop
- Length: 49:50
- Label: 1501 Certified; 300
- Producer: Avedon; Buddah Bless; Cool & Dre; D.A Got That Dope; Helluva; IllaDaProducer; J. White Did It; Juicy J; Tay Keith; Benjamin Lasnier; LilJuMadeDaBeat; Mustard; Pooyandeh; J. R. Rotem; Scott Storch; Cody Tarpley

Megan Thee Stallion chronology
Suga (2020)	Good News (2020)	Something for Thee Hotties (2021)

Singles from Good News
- 1. "Girls in the Hood" Released: June 26, 2020; 2. "Don't Stop" Released: October 2, 2020; 3. "Body" Released: November 20, 2020; 4. "Cry Baby" Released: February 3, 2021

Good News is the debut studio album by American rapper-songwriter Megan Thee Stallion. It was released on November 20, 2020, by 300 Entertainment and 1501 Certified Entertainment. The album features guest appearances from DaBaby, City Girls, Lil Durk, SZA, Popcaan, Mustard, Big Sean, 2 Chainz, Young Thug, and Beyoncé. The music was written and produced with a host of musicians, including D.A Got That Dope, LilJuMadeDaBeat, Juicy J, J. White Did It, and Scott Storch.

Good News was met with widespread acclaim, with critics praising the clever and compelling qualities of Megan Thee Stallion's raps. The album produced four singles: "Girls in the Hood", released on June 26, 2020, "Don't Stop", featuring Young Thug, released on October 2, 2020, "Body", released alongside the album, and "Cry Baby", featuring DaBaby, released on February 3, 2021. The album also contains the remix of the single "Savage" from Suga, featuring Beyoncé, which earned Megan her first number one on the US Billboard Hot 100.

Commercially, Good News debuted at number two on the Billboard 200 after moving over 100,000 album-equivalent units in its first week. In addition to topping both the Top R&B/Hip-Hop Albums and Rap Albums charts, it also peaked in the top 50 of countries such as the United Kingdom, Australia, Canada, Ireland and New Zealand.

== Background ==
Megan Pete, known professionally as Megan Thee Stallion, began writing hip-hop as a student at Texas Southern University in Houston. After videos of her freestyle rapping went viral, Megan released a mixtape titled Tina Snow in 2018. The critical and commercial success of Tina Snow caught the attention of 300 Entertainment, with whom Megan signed in November 2018. She became the first female rap artist to sign with 300 since the label's establishment in 2012. The song "Big Ole Freak" from Tina Snow became Megan Thee Stallion's first Billboard Hot 100 chart entry, and also appeared at number nine on the Billboard R&B/Hip-Hop Airplay chart, and number 38 on the Hot R&B/Hip-Hop Songs charts. She followed up with the mixtape Fever, released on May 17, 2019, via 300 Entertainment and 1501 Certified Entertainment. Fever debuted at number 10 on the Billboard 200.

In October 2019, the rapper first discussed plans about dropping her debut studio album in 2020 while promoting her upcoming project Suga. She further stated that she was "ready to settle down with an album". Megan had first intended for her Suga to be her debut album, but following legal troubles between her and her label, 1501 Certified, it was instead released as an extended play (EP) on March 6, 2020.

Seven months later, in October 2020, she provided more insight into the album-making process, including posting pictures with frequent producer LilJuMadeDaBeat, and also first acknowledging that her album was under production, tweeting on October 17, 2020, "My album abt to go crazy". At that time, she was awaiting two more features to finalize the recording process. She also stated that she used the time during quarantine to write and record for her album. About the recording process, she said: "When I'm by myself, that's when my creativity comes to me. The whole album was basically written in the living room, the shower, the backyard—just visualise it with me." She officially announced the album through social media on November 12, followed by the reveal of its tracklist on November 17.

== Music and lyrics ==
On Good News, Megan Thee Stallion raps about the controversy surrounding herself and Tory Lanez, partying, sex, her personal life, and men she prefers not to date. One critic noted that despite being filled with "sex positivity and club-ready anthems", the album also contains "glimpses of that [serious] tone was first introduced with 'Shots Fired'". "Shots Fired", the opening track, is built around a sample of the 1995 song "Who Shot Ya?" by The Notorious B.I.G. and has been described as a "traditional", "strong" and "scathing" indirect diss track with a "ringing, stark beat" aimed at fellow rapper Tory Lanez in response to his album Daystar, which itself was released in response to allegations that Lanez shot Megan in July 2020.

The second track, "Circles", was described as "one of [Megan's] signature bad b*tch anthems", and sees her rapping over a sample of Jazmine Sullivan's 2010 single "Holding You Down (Goin' in Circles)", with lyrics that exhibit Megan's resiliency. "Cry Baby" featuring DaBaby has been described as a "slow, tick-tock-ing" song with a "haunting backing track", revolving around Megan and DaBaby's active sex lives. "Sugar Baby" was described as "bluesy [and] brassy"; a track that sees Megan "transcend sweetness" with lyrics that see her "imploring her cheapskate lover to save his money for the future".

"Freaky Girls" featuring SZA was a highly anticipated collaboration. It contains a sample of Adina Howard's 1995 debut single "Freak Like Me" and was described as "immaculate" and "a true highlight" that is "audibly rooted in 90s G-funk" with "catchy and sex-positive" lyrics. "Body", the third single from the album, was described as a "crisp three minutes of bouncy beats and self-confident lyrics", seeing Megan "celebrating body positivity". "What's New" was described as a "quintessential Megan record where she thrashes her haters for talking reckless about her", while "Work That" was called "a fun, club-friendly track" that samples rapper Juvenile's 2006 single "Rodeo" and saw Megan "continue to boast about her sexual prowess". "Intercourse" featuring Popcaan and Mustard was described as "island-tinged" and "syrupy" with "Megan [...] thriving on the dancehall sound" of the track, and "Go Crazy" featuring Big Sean and 2 Chainz was called "lithe" and sees Megan "standing tall when sparring with Big Sean and 2 Chainz [...] with two punchy verses". "Go Crazy" samples The Jackson 5’s "ABC" as well as Naughty By Nature’s "O.P.P.".

"Don't Rock Me to Sleep" features Megan singing about "moving on from a relationship" while "taking a shot at pop success". "Outside" was described as a "fun, celebratory record" and a "sing-song tune in a nice contrast from [Megan's] harder-hitting tracks" that was backed by an "electronic piano motif" sampled from "Something in My Heart" from the 1989 eponymous album by R&B singer Michel'le. "Savage Remix", which features Beyoncé, goes through "minuscule instrumental changes" from the original, with the remix being called "essentially an entirely new song, with the exception of the chorus which has remained the same", lyrically. Beyoncé's verse was noted to include subtle references to women's empowerment. "Girls in the Hood" samples "Boyz-n-the-Hood" by Eazy-E and has been described as a "minimal 80s gangsta rap". The album closes with "Don't Stop" featuring fellow rapper Young Thug, which is a hip-hop track with a "punchy electronic beat", with sex-positive lyrics.

== Singles ==
"Girls in the Hood", the first single from the album, was announced on June 24, 2020, and released two days later. The song received a lyric video and features a prominent sample of "Boyz-n-the-Hood" by Eazy-E. The single debuted and peaked at number 28 on the Hot 100. Megan performed "Girls in the Hood" live during her debut live performance at the 20th BET Awards, in a medley with the "Savage Remix", and again during her first virtual live appearance, streamed live on Tidal on August 29, 2020.

"Don't Stop" featuring Young Thug, was released along with a music video directed by Colin Tilley on October 2, 2020, as the second single from the album. It charted at number 61 on the Billboard Global 200. Megan performed the track with Young Thug during her Saturday Night Live debut on the season premiere of the 46th season of the show.

"Body" was released as the third single alongside a music video directed by Colin Tilley on November 20, 2020, coinciding with the release of the album. It was written while Megan was in quarantine and is inspired by her figure, and its music video features cameos from various celebrities, including Taraji P. Henson, Blac Chyna, and Jordyn Woods, among others.

The third track on the album "Cry Baby" featuring DaBaby was serviced to rhythmic and urban contemporary radio on February 3, 2021, as the album's fourth single. The song's official music video also premiered the same day and features a cameo from Instagram comedian BlameItonKway. The single reached number 28 on the Billboard Hot 100.

=== Other songs ===
"Savage (Remix)" featuring Beyoncé, was released on April 29, 2020. Commercially, the single has accumulated over 3 million units in the US. It became Megan's first number one on the US Billboard Hot 100. A music video for the song "Movie" featuring Lil Durk premiered on April 15, 2021.

== Critical reception ==
Professional ratings
Aggregate scores
Source	Rating
AnyDecentMusic?	8.2/10
Metacritic	85/100
Review scores
Source	Rating
AllMusic	4/5 stars
Beats Per Minute	80%
Clash	9/10
Consequence of Sound	B+
Evening Standard	4/5 stars
Exclaim!	8/10
Gigwise	10/10 stars
The Guardian	5/5 stars
MusicOMH	4/5 stars
NME	4/5 stars
Pitchfork	7.8/10
Rolling Stone	4/5 stars

According to the review aggregator Metacritic, Good News received "universal acclaim" based on a weighted average score of 85 out of 100 from 14 critic scores.

Mikael Wood of Los Angeles Times deemed Good News the most impressive debut album of 2020 and described the rapper's voice as one of "the most authoritative voices in hip-hop," which ultimately "gives her music a rock-solid center that suits her fixed subject matter." Alexis Petridis of The Guardian noted that the album highlighted that Megan is "phenomenal at what she does," and further described her talents as "a moveable feast". Robin Murray of Clash wrote that "Good News is the sound of Megan Thee Stallion pushing against the boundaries and an album overwhelming in its creative intensity". Apart from hailing it a "late contender of the Album of the Year", Murray stated that "the album emphasises the riveting nature of her self-expression, and her canny ear as a cultural curator". At Evening Standard, David Smyth attributed the album as "money, sex, single entendres, graphic imagery and a bulletproof self-confidence", adding that Megan has "amassed tonnes of both, and shared every vivid detail of the process in her sparse, old school songs". A. D. Amorosi of Variety wrote that the album is "focused on fun while still being a proud statement on Black womanhood" and concluded that it finds Megan "moving confidently to the next level", though the writer noted "Outside" and other "uncluttered" tracks to be "more warm-blooded than most of Good News, one wishes there was more of that sound on her debut album."

In a review for AllMusic, Fred Thomas claimed that "Rather than coast on her established success, Good News finds the rapper firing off at full power, decimating her haters, and delivering track after track of sex-positive, voraciously vulgar, yet stunningly clever rhyme skills." Candice McDuffie's compliments also focused on similar elements in the review for Consequence of Sound; "Good News showcases Megan the Stallion’s creative depth, her euphonious inventiveness, and libidinous wordplay. She completely demolishes any track she appears on." Keith Harris at NME gave similar praise, stating "Megan's own flow is musical enough to offer its own hooks without outside ornamentation."

=== Accolades ===
Accolades for Good News
Publication	Accolade	Rank
Billboard	The 50 Best Albums of 2020	12
Complex	Top 50 Albums of 2020	30
Consequence of Sound	Top 50 Albums of 2020	49
Gigwise	Top 51 Albums of 2020	6
The Line of Best Fit	Top 50 Albums of 2020	21
Los Angeles Times	The Best Albums of 2020	10
Pitchfork	The 50 Best Albums of 2020	43
Rolling Stone	The 50 Best Albums of 2020	27
Uproxx	Top 50 Albums of 2020	33

== Track listing ==
Good News track listing
No.	Title	Writer(s)	Producer(s)	Length
1.	"Shots Fired"	Megan Pete; Tyron Douglas; Herb Magidson; Allie Wrubel	Buddah Bless	2:50
2.	"Circles"	Pete; Jordan Thorpe; Marcello Valenzano; Andre Lyon; Ricknoleon Perez; Jazmine Sullivan^{[b]}; Melissa Elliott^{[b]}; Cainon Lamb; Douglas Davis^{[b]}; Ricky Walters^{[b]}; Mary J. Blige^{[b]}; Sean Combs^{[b]}; Arlene DelValle; Jean-Claude Olivier^{[b]}; Curtis Mayfield; Nasir Jones^{[b]}; Anthony Cruz; Cory McKay; Inga Marchand^{[b]}; Roy Hammond; Craig Brockman; Dave Atkinson; Gilbert Askey; Samuel Barnes^{[b]}	Cool & Dre; Rickstarr Did It^{[c]}	2:50
3.	"Cry Baby" (featuring DaBaby)	Pete; Jonathan Kirk; David Doman; Katie Smith; Daniel Levin	D.A. Got That Dope	2:17
4.	"Do It on the Tip" (featuring City Girls and Hot Girl Meg)	Pete; Caresha Brownlee; Jatavia Johnson; Julian Mason	LilJuMadeDaBeat	2:47
5.	"Sugar Baby"	Pete; Martin McCurtis; Webster Gradney; Jeremy Varnard; Jalen Patterson	Helluva; Stuntman^{[a]}	2:26
6.	"Movie" (featuring Lil Durk)	Pete; Durk Banks; Brytavious Chambers	Tay Keith	3:47
7.	"Freaky Girls" (featuring SZA)	Pete; Solána Rowe; Jordan Houston; Eugene Hanes^{[d]}; Marc Valentine^{[d]}; Loren Hill^{[d]}; William Collins^{[d]}; George Clinton^{[d]}; Gary Cooper^{[d]}	Juicy J	2:46
8.	"Body"	Pete; Christophe Petrel; Mason	LilJuMadeDaBeat	2:51
9.	"What's New"	Pete; Vincent van den Ende; Cody Tarpley	Avedon; Tarpley	2:35
10.	"Work That"	Pete; Derrick Milano; Houston; Donny Flores; Juan Guerreri-Maril; Terius Gray^{[e]}; Jermany James^{[e]}; Robert Kelly^{[e]}; Valenzano^{[e]}; Lyon^{[e]}; Mark Morales; Damon Wimbley; Darren Robinson	Juicy J; Z3N	2:14
11.	"Intercourse" (featuring Popcaan and Mustard)	Pete; Andrae Sutherland; Dijon McFarlane; Shah Rukh Zaman Khan	Mustard; Gylttryp^{[c]}	3:17
12.	"Go Crazy" (featuring Big Sean and 2 Chainz)	Pete; Sean Anderson; Tauheed Epps; Jonathan Rotem; Benjamin Lasnier; Nicki Pooyandeh; Anthony Criss^{[f]}; Vincent Brown^{[f]}; Keir Gist^{[f]}; Berry Gordy^{[f]}; Freddie Perren^{[f]}; Alphonzo Mizell^{[f]}; Deke Richards^{[f]}	J. R. Rotem; Lasnier^{[c]}; Pooyandeh^{[c]}	3:45
13.	"Don't Rock Me to Sleep"	Pete; Van de Ende; Lennard Vink	Avedon; Vynk^{[c]}	3:03
14.	"Outside"	Pete; Houston; Michel'le Toussant^{[g]}; Andre Young; Andre Bolton^{[g]}	Juicy J	2:31
15.	"Savage" (featuring Beyoncé)	Pete; Bobby Session Jr.; Beyoncé Knowles-Carter^{[i]}; Shawn Carter ^{[i]}; Terius Nash^{[i]}; Brittany Hazzard^{[i]}; Thorpe^{[i]}; Milano^{[i]}; Anthony White	J. White Did It; Beyoncé^{[v]}	4:02
16.	"Girls in the Hood"	Pete; Session; Scott Storch; Ilyah Fraser; Eric Wright; O'Shea Jackson^{[h]}; Young	Storch; Illadaproducer	2:34
17.	"Don't Stop" (featuring Young Thug)	Pete; Jeffery Williams; Douglas	Buddah Bless	3:07
Total length:				49:42

=== Notes ===
- ^{^[a]} denotes an additional producer.
- ^{^[c]} denotes a co-producer.
- ^{^[v]} denotes a vocal producer.
- ^{^[i]} denotes "Savage" remix writers who contributed to the remix version and were absent from the writing process in the original version.

==== Sample credits ====
- "Shots Fired" contains an uncredited sample of "Who Shot Ya?" by The Notorious B.I.G..
- ^{^[b]} "Circles" contains samples of "Holding You Down (Goin' in Circles)", performed by Jazmine Sullivan, which further samples Doug E. Fresh and MC Ricky D's "La Di Da Di", Mary J. Blige's "Be Happy" and Nas's "I Can" and "Affirmative Action".
- ^{^[d]} "Freaky Girls" contains a sample of "Freak Like Me" by Adina Howard.
- ^{^[e]} "Work That" contains samples of "Rodeo", performed by Juvenile, which further samples R. Kelly's "Bump n' Grind (Old School Remix)".
- ^{^[f]} "Go Crazy" samples "O.P.P." by Naughty By Nature, which in turn samples "ABC" by The Jackson 5.
- ^{^[g]} "Outside" samples "Something in My Heart" by Michel'le.
- ^{^[h]} "Girls in the Hood" samples "Boyz-n-the-Hood" by Eazy-E.
- ^{^[i]} denotes "Savage" remix writers who contributed to the remix version and were absent from the writing process in the original version

== Credits and personnel ==
Credits adapted from Tidal.

=== Performance ===
- Megan Thee Stallion – primary artist (all tracks)
- DaBaby – featured artist (track 3)
- City Girls – featured artist (track 4)
- Hot Girl Meg – featured artist (track 4)
- Lil Durk – featured artist (track 6)
- SZA – featured artist (track 7)
- Mustard – featured artist (track 11)
- Popcaan – featured artist (track 11)
- 2 Chainz – featured artist (track 12)
- Big Sean – featured artist (track 12)
- Beyoncé – featured artist (track 15)
- Young Thug – featured artist (track 17)

=== Musicians ===
- Cody Tarpley – bass (track 9), drums (track 9), keyboards (track 9)
- Vincent Van Den Ende – bass (track 9), drums (track 9), keyboards (track 9)

=== Technical ===
- Mike Dean – mastering (tracks 1–14), mixing (tracks 1, 3–7, and 11–12)
- Colin Leonard – mastering (tracks 15–17)
- MixedByAli – mixing (track 2)
- Jaycen Joshua – mixing (tracks 8–10 and 13–17)
- KY – mixing (track 12)
- Stuart Price – mixing (track 15), recording (track 15)
- Ricky Reed – vocal mixing (track 7)
- Sage Skolfield – mixing assistance (tracks 1–7, 11, and 12)
- Sean Solymar – mixing assistance (tracks 1–7, 11, and 12)
- Jacob Richards – mixing assistance (track 17)
- Mike Seaberg – mixing assistance (track 17)
- Source – recording (tracks 1–16), engineering (track 17)
- Coach Brodie – recording (track 3)
- Joshua Samuel – recording (track 6)
- Rob Bisel – recording (track 7)
- Nolan Presley – recording (track 12)
- eMix – recording (track 15)
- Bainz – engineering (track 17), vocal recording engineering (track 17)
- Aresh Banaji ― engineering assistance (track 17)

== Charts ==
=== Weekly charts ===
Weekly chart performance of Good News
Chart (2020)	Peak position
Australian Albums (ARIA)	41
Belgian Albums (Ultratop Flanders)	91
Belgian Albums (Ultratop Wallonia)	141
Canadian Albums (Billboard)	9
Dutch Albums (Album Top 100)	77
French Albums (SNEP)	107
Irish Albums (OCC)	22
Lithuanian Albums (AGATA)	55
New Zealand Albums (RMNZ)	22
UK Albums (OCC)	46
UK R&B Albums (OCC)	6
US Billboard 200	2
US Top R&B/Hip-Hop Albums (Billboard)	1
US Indie Store Album Sales (Billboard)	7

=== Year-end charts ===
Year-end chart performance for Good News
Chart (2021)	Position
US Billboard 200	18
US Top R&B/Hip-Hop Albums (Billboard)	12

== Certifications ==
Certifications and sales for Good News
Region	Certification	Certified units/sales
New Zealand (RMNZ)	Gold	7,500^{‡}
United Kingdom (BPI)	Silver	60,000^{‡}
United States (RIAA)	Platinum	1,000,000^{‡}
^{‡} Sales+streaming figures based on certification alone.
