= Love Is Poison (song) =

2018 promotional single by YoungBoy Never Broke Again

Promotional single by YoungBoy Never Broke Again

from the album Until Death Call My Name
- Released: February 8, 2018
- Length: 2:38
- Label: Never Broke Again
- Songwriter(s): Kentrell Gaulden; Alex Petit
- Producer(s): CashMoneyAP

"Love Is Poison" is a song by American rapper YoungBoy Never Broke Again. It was first released on January 11, 2018, via YouTube before being released to streaming services on February 8, 2018. It is the first promotional single from his debut studio album Until Death Call My Name (2018), appearing as a bonus track. Produced by CashMoneyAP, the song finds NBA YoungBoy lamenting over a failed relationship.

== Critical reception ==
Mitch Findlay of HotNewHipHop gave a positive review of the song, writing that "YoungBoy gets a chance to show off some storytelling prowess" and "Overall, it's a powerful piece of writing, and showcases some nuance in the young rapper's pen game."

== Certifications ==
Region	Certification	Certified units/sales
United States (RIAA)	Platinum	1,000,000^{‡}
^{‡} Sales+streaming figures based on certification alone.
