= Diamond Teeth Samurai =

Single by YoungBoy Never Broke Again

Single by YoungBoy Never Broke Again

from the album Until Death Call My Name
- Released: April 2, 2018
- Recorded: 2017
- Genre: Hip hop
- Length: 2:42
- Label: Never Broke Again; Atlantic
- Songwriter(s): Kentrell Gaulden; Damion Williams; Dwayne Carter; Byron Thomas; Terius Gray; Christopher Dorsey
- Producer(s): DJ Swift

YoungBoy Never Broke Again singles chronology
"Outside Today" (2018)	"Diamond Teeth Samurai" (2018)	"Self Control" (2019)

Music video
- "Diamond Teeth Samurai" on YouTube

"Diamond Teeth Samurai" is a song by American rapper YoungBoy Never Broke Again and the second single from his debut studio album Until Death Call My Name (2018). It was released to streaming services on April 2, 2018 along with its music video, and interpolates "Tha Block Is Hot" by Lil Wayne. YoungBoy previously previewed the track in late 2017.

== Charts ==
Chart (2018)	Peak position
US Billboard Hot 100	59
US Hot R&B/Hip-Hop Songs (Billboard)	30

== Certifications ==
Region	Certification	Certified units/sales
United States (RIAA)	Platinum	1,000,000^{‡}
^{‡} Sales+streaming figures based on certification alone.
