= Kacey Talk =

2020 single by YoungBoy Never Broke Again

Single by YoungBoy Never Broke Again

from the album Top
- Released: August 13, 2020
- Genre: Trap
- Length: 2:32
- Label: Never Broke Again; Atlantic; Artist
- Songwriters: Kentrell Gaulden; Julia Lewis; Jason Goldberg; Sebastian Lopez
- Producers: Julia Lewis; Jason Goldberg; 1Mind

YoungBoy Never Broke Again singles chronology
"All In" (2020)	"Kacey Talk" (2020)	"Callin" (2020)

Music video
- "Kacey Talk" on YouTube

"Kacey Talk" is a song by American rapper YoungBoy Never Broke Again, released on August 13, 2020, as the second single from his second studio album, Top, released on September 11, 2020. The guitar-driven song is named after YoungBoy's son, Kacey, who also contributed vocals to the song and appears in the official video. Lyrically, it's about YoungBoy offering a guide on moving to a higher level in life, with further raps about women and how to differentiate between real and fake friends. The cover, designed by YoungBoy himself, was told that it looks similar to the cover of YNW Melly’s album I Am You (2018). “Kacey Talk" peaked at number 19 on the Billboard Hot R&B/Hip-Hop Songs chart. It also reached numbers 33 and 50 on both the Rhythmic and Hot 100 charts respectively. The song was certified double platinum in the United States by the Recording Industry Association of America (RIAA), denoting units of over 2,000,000 units. An accompanying music video for the single, directed by Rich Porter, features the rapper at a casino and in front of a fancy car, along with some scenes showcasing both his businessman and artist lifestyles respectively.

== Background and composition ==
NBA YoungBoy had teased the song in the week leading up its release. An unreleased version surfaced on the Internet before its official release. The track is driven by a guitar melody and heavy percussions and features "quick" ad-libs from YoungBoy's one-year old son Kacey. Lyrically, YoungBoy "offers a tutorial on how to move on a higher level", according to HipHopDX's Jake Rohn. He further raps about women that are "come and go" and how he differentiates between real and fake friends. AllHipHop noted that "Ironically with his kids around him, he seems to have found the realest ones in his circle".

== Critical reception ==
Revolt's Jon Powell said YoungBoy "continues to deliver dope releases to his fans at will". HotNewHipHop's Alex Zidel noted the track for being a "guitar-driven banger".

== Music video ==
The video was released alongside the song and was directed by Rich Porter, a frequent director for YoungBoy. It sees the rapper in designer leather and vests that draws attention to his riches. He places bets in a casino and raps in front of a fancy car, while scenes also showcase his lifestyle as a businessman and as an artist; the latter is displayed through two of his children, (including the song's namesake) doing recreational painting on the white walls around him, which can be seen on the single's artwork cover.

== Charts ==
On the week of August 29, 2020, "Kacey Talk" debuted at number 58 on the Billboard Hot 100. Four weeks later, it peaked at number 50 the week of September 26, and stayed on the chart for sixteen weeks.

=== Weekly charts ===
Chart (2020)	Peak position
US Billboard Hot 100	50
US Hot R&B/Hip-Hop Songs (Billboard)	19
US Rhythmic Airplay (Billboard)	33
US Rolling Stone Top 100	20

=== Year-end charts ===
Chart (2020)	Position
US Hot R&B/Hip-Hop Songs (Billboard)	96

== Certifications ==
Region	Certification	Certified units/sales
United States (RIAA)	6× Platinum	6,000,000^{‡}
^{‡} Sales+streaming figures based on certification alone.
