= Right Foot Creep =

2020 song by YoungBoy Never Broke Again

Song by YoungBoy Never Broke Again

from the album Top
- Released: September 11, 2020
- Genre: Trap; hip hop
- Length: 2:39
- Label: Never Broke Again; Atlantic
- Songwriters: Kentrell Gaulden; Tavian Dawson Carter
- Producer: TayTayMadeIt

Audio video
- "Right Foot Creep" on YouTube

"Right Foot Creep" is a song by American rapper YoungBoy Never Broke Again, released on September 11, 2020, as the fourth track from his second studio album, Top. This upbeat trap song sees YoungBoy rapping about his love for firearms and gang culture.

== Background ==
Prior to the song's release, high school athlete Allen Davis created the griddy, a popular dance that went viral following the song's release on the video-sharing app TikTok due to the use of the track with the dance. Following the rise of the dance and song, several performers such as Ja Morant begun to use the song in their social media posts, boosting the song's publicity.

On April 29, 2021, the "Get Griddy" emote, which includes a clip of the song, was added to the Epic Games-developed Fortnite.

== Charts ==
| Chart (2020) | Peak position |
|---|---|
| Global 200 (Billboard) | 186 |
| US Billboard Hot 100 | 88 |
| US Hot R&B/Hip-Hop Songs (Billboard) | 35 |

== Certifications ==
| Region | Certification | Certified units/sales |
|---|---|---|
| United States (RIAA) | Platinum | 1,000,000^{‡} |
^{‡} Sales+streaming figures based on certification alone.
