= Until Death Call My Name =

2018 album by YoungBoy Never Broke Again

Studio album by YoungBoy Never Broke Again
- Released: April 27, 2018
- Recorded: 2017–2018
- Genre: Hip hop
- Length: 40:16; 58:41 (Reloaded)
- Labels: Never Broke Again; Atlantic
- Producers: 1040; AlexvnderWolf; Ben Billions; Big Korey; Bighead; CashMoneyAP; DJ Chose; DJ Montay; DJ Swift; DMacTooBangin; Drumma Boy; Dubba-AA; Dyryk; Judge; Kaixen; Kenny Beats; Laury; Mook; PlayboyXO; Schife Karbeen; TM88; Wheezy

YoungBoy Never Broke Again chronology
| Fed Baby's (2017) | Until Death Call My Name (2018) | Master the Day of Judgement (2018) |

Singles from Until Death Call My Name
- 1. "Outside Today" Released: January 6, 2018; 2. "Diamond Teeth Samurai" Released: April 2, 2018; 3. "Villain" Released: June 21, 2018

Until Death Call My Name is the debut studio album by American rapper YoungBoy Never Broke Again. It was released on April 27, 2018, by Never Broke Again and Atlantic Records. The album features guest appearances from Future and Birdman, along with Lil Uzi Vert and Offset on the reloaded version.

== Background ==
The album's title and original release date was announced on January 6, 2018. The album was originally slated for a March 2, 2018 release, however the release date was pushed back to April 27, 2018.

The album was made available for pre-order on Apple Music on January 6, 2018.

== Singles ==
The album's lead single, "Outside Today", was released on January 6, 2018 to streaming services, along with its music video. The song peaked at number 31 on the Billboard Hot 100, becoming YoungBoy's highest charting song to date.

The album's second single, "Diamond Teeth Samurai", was released to streaming services on April 2, 2018, along with its music video. It debuted at number 59 on the Billboard Hot 100.

== Critical reception ==
Professional ratings
Review scores
| Source | Rating |
|---|---|
| AllMusic | 2.5/5 stars |
| HipHopDX | 3.8/5 |
| Pitchfork | 6.9/10 |

Until Death Call My Name received mediocre reviews from music critics. Paul Simmons from AllMusic stated that YoungBoy's "intense, unrelenting music details the harrowing violence he's experienced, as well as inflicted upon others." Just Ivey from HipHopDX noted that "The hard-living youngster’s speedy entry into parenthood — spurred on by fathering multiple children before even being able to legally drink alcohol — is one reason for his search for atonement." This was followed by a full review where he stated, "Until Death Call My Name, much like its creator, has its issues but beams with promise. YoungBoy is extremely polished for his age, which would normally bode well for a burgeoning artist." Sheldon Pearce from Pitchfork began his review by stating that "YoungBoy Never Broke Again, is a meditation on violence, the pangs of conscience, and the ways anticipating an early grave can tint perspective." He notes that "On more than one occasion on the album, YoungBoy characterizes himself as a demon or a devil or a reaper, as if to acknowledge the all-consuming darkness that lives within him." Pearce concludes his review by stating that "At the very least, though, Until Death provides plenty of insight into the perilous environments that condition young thugs. “Villain,” in which he embraces his inner demons and violent nature."

== Commercial performance ==
Until Death Call My Name debuted at number seven on the US Billboard 200 chart, earning 43,000 album-equivalent units, (including 8,000 traditional album sales) in its first week. This became Youngboy's first US top-ten debut. On January 25, 2019, the album was certified platinum by the Recording Industry Association of America (RIAA) for combined sales and album-equivalent units on over a million units in the United States.

== Track listing ==
Until Death Call My Name
| No. | Title | Writer(s) | Producer(s) | Length |
|---|---|---|---|---|
| 1. | "Overdose" | Kentrell Gaulden; Brenden Murray | Bighead | 2:56 |
| 2. | "Preach" | Gaulden; Damion Williams | DJ Swift | 3:56 |
| 3. | "Diamond Teeth Samurai" | Gaulden; D. Williams; Dwayne Carter; Byron Thomas; Terius Gray; Christopher Noel Dorsey | DJ Swift | 2:42 |
| 4. | "Outside Today" | Gaulden; Dylan McKinney | DMacTooBangin | 2:09 |
| 5. | "Astronaut Kid" | Gaulden; Alex Petit | CashMoneyAP; AlexvnderWolf^{[a]} | 3:06 |
| 6. | "We Poppin" (featuring Birdman) | Gaulden; Bryan Williams; Christopher Gholson | Drumma Boy | 4:05 |
| 7. | "Solar Eclipse" | Gaulden; Aaron Lockhart, Jr.; Joseph Steele; Treallion Escobar; Brandon Bostic | Dubba-AA; 1040 | 3:47 |
| 8. | "Villain" | Gaulden; Benjamin Diehl; Ian Lewis | Ben Billions; Schife Karbeen | 2:49 |
| 9. | "Traumatized" | Gaulden; Paul Judge; Kenneth Blume III | Kenny Beats; Judge | 2:08 |
| 10. | "Worth It" | Gaulden; D. Williams; Lockhart, Jr.; Brayon Nelson | DJ Swift; Dubba-AA; Mook | 3:25 |
| 11. | "Right or Wrong" (featuring Future) | Gaulden; Nayvadius Wilburn; Montay Humphrey; Korey Roberson | DJ Montay; Big Korey | 4:00 |
| 12. | "Public Figure" | Gaulden; Wesley Glass; Bryan Simmons | Wheezy; TM88 | 2:31 |
| 13. | "Rags to Riches" | Gaulden; Petit | CashMoneyAP; AlexvnderWolf^{[a]} | 1:38 |
| Total length: | | | | 40:16 |

Until Death Call My Name: Reloaded (bonus tracks)
| No. | Title | Writer(s) | Producer(s) | Length |
|---|---|---|---|---|
| 14. | "Run It Up" | Gaulden; Derek Garcia; Julian Munro | Dyryk; Kaixen | 2:43 |
| 15. | "R.I.P" (featuring Offset) | Gaulden; Kiari Cephus; Norman Payne | DJ Chose | 2:39 |
| 16. | "Rich Nigga" (featuring Lil Uzi Vert) | Gaulden; Symere Woods; Lockhart, Jr.; Mike Laury | Dubba-AA; Laury | 2:26 |
| 17. | "Thug Cry" | Gaulden; Lockhart, Jr.; Nelson | Dubba-AA; Mook | 2:00 |
| 18. | "Through the Storm" | Gaulden; Lockhart, Jr.; Laury | Dubba-AA; Laury | 2:44 |
| 19. | "Genie" | Gaulden | PlayboyXO | 3:15 |
| 20. | "Love Is Poison" | Gaulden; Petit | CashMoneyAP | 2:38 |
| Total length: | | | | 58:42 |

Notes

- ^{^[a]} signifies an uncredited co-producer.
- "Diamond Teeth Samurai" interpolates "Tha Block is Hot" by Lil Wayne featuring Juvenile and B.G.

== Charts ==
=== Weekly charts ===
| Chart (2018) | Peak position |
|---|---|
| Canadian Albums (Billboard) | 38 |
| US Billboard 200 | 7 |
| US Top R&B/Hip-Hop Albums (Billboard) | 5 |
| US Top Rap Albums (Billboard) | 4 |

=== Year-end charts ===
| Chart (2018) | Position |
|---|---|
| US Billboard 200 | 76 |
| US Top R&B/Hip-Hop Albums (Billboard) | 35 |
| Chart (2019) | Position |
| US Billboard 200 | 107 |

== Certifications ==
| Region | Certification | Certified units/sales |
|---|---|---|
| United States (RIAA) | 2× Platinum | 2,000,000^{‡} |
^{‡} Sales+streaming figures based on certification alone.
