= Don't Stop (Megan Thee Stallion song) =

2020 single by Megan Thee Stallion featuring Young Thug

Single by Megan Thee Stallion featuring Young Thug

from the album Good News
- Released: October 2, 2020
- Recorded: August 2020
- Genre: Hip hop
- Length: 3:08
- Label: 1501 Certified; 300
- Songwriters: Megan Pete; Jeffery Williams; Tyron Douglas; Richard Duran
- Producer: Buddah Bless

Megan Thee Stallion singles chronology
"WAP" (2020)	"Don't Stop" (2020)	"Thick (Remix)" (2020)

Young Thug singles chronology
"Say You Love Me" (2020)	"Don't Stop" (2020)	"Jimmy Choo" (2020)

Music video
- "Don't Stop" on YouTube

"Don't Stop" is a song by American rapper-songwriter Megan Thee Stallion featuring fellow American rapper Young Thug. It was written alongside Ricky Remedy and producer Buddah Bless. The song was released on October 2, 2020 by 1501 Certified Entertainment and 300 Entertainment as the second official single from her debut studio album Good News (2020). Musically, it is a sex-positive hip hop song with production inspired by electronic and industrial music.

"Don't Stop" debuted and peaked at number 30 on the Billboard Hot 100. To promote the song, Megan performed it alongside Young Thug during the season premiere of the 46th season of Saturday Night Live. A music video inspired by the 1951 film Alice in Wonderland and directed by Colin Tilley was released on the same day as the song.

== Background and release ==
The collaboration was first teased via the Instagram page of 300 Entertainment after they posted a picture of the two artists in the studio together, a week before the song's release. On September 28, 2020, Megan posted the song's cover art and release date to her Instagram. The song was released on October 2, 2020.

On October 8, 2020, Megan partnered with Amazon Music to create the "Don't Stop" scholarship fund, which provided two women of color pursuing an associate degree, bachelor's degree or postgraduate degree in any field of study with $10,000 each.

== Composition ==
"Don't Stop" is a hip hop song with elements of electronic and industrial music in its production. The track is backed instrumentally by "glitch" sounds and heavy percussion MTV Australia's Jackson Langford compared the song's production to that of British record label PC Music. The song includes "raunchy" and "sex-positive" lyrics, such as "I've got a stank ass walk and a reckless ass mouth" and "Don't stop, pop that cat".

== Critical reception ==
Jessica McKinney of Complex identified the song as one of the best released during the week ending October 2, 2020. Billboard's Jason Lipshutz praised the song, writing that it "sounds like it would absolutely ignite any dance floor or arena crowd upon which it is dropped", and calling the production "one of Buddah Bless' most spectacular productions to date". Andrew Sacher of BrooklynVegan called the track a "banger". Langford of MTV Australia wrote that, with "Don't Stop", "Megan asserts her dominance over the globe once again – just in case you forgot who was in charge.". Writing for Paper, Sarah Mai complimented the song's lyrics, referring to them as "clever and fun".

== Live performances ==
A day after the release of "Don't Stop", Megan performed the track during the season premiere of Saturday Night Live alongside Young Thug.

== Commercial performance ==
"Don't Stop" debuted and peaked at number 30 on the Billboard Hot 100 chart for the week ending October 17, 2020, with 13.8 million domestic streams and 5,000 downloads. The single also debuted at number one on Billboard's Top Triller US and Top Triller Global charts, displacing Dixie D'Amelio's "Be Happy", and at number 61 on the Billboard Global 200 chart, amassing 18.6 million streams and 6,000 downloads globally.

== Music video ==
The music video for "Don't Stop", directed by Colin Tilley, was released alongside the song, serving as the first official music video from Megan's debut album Good News. Megan Thee Stallion appears throughout the video dressed in outfits inspired by various characters from Alice in Wonderland, including Alice, the Queen of Hearts, and the Cheshire Cat. The video also features voguing dancers from the HBO Max series Legendary (on which Megan is a judge), Megan riding a giant rocking horse and twerking, and an animated cat which resembles the Cheshire Cat. Young Thug appears during his verse dressed as Edward Scissorhands.

=== Reception ===
Pitchfork's Eric Torres named the video for "Don't Stop" the third best music video released in October 2020, calling it "a delirious trip through familiar cinematic imagery, all delivered by Megan’s tongue-wagging, irreverent charisma." Zoe Haylock of Vulture reviewed the video positively, writing, "The music video is endless twists on classics, with just enough Meg in there to make them feel brand new. And, it’s carefree."

== Personnel ==
Credits adapted from Tidal.

- Megan Thee Stallion – vocals, songwriting
- Young Thug – vocals, songwriting
- Buddah Bless – production, songwriting
- A. "Bainz" Bains – engineering, vocal recording engineering
- Shawn "Source" Jarrett – engineering
- Aresh Banaji – assistant engineering
- Jaycen Joshua – mixing
- Jacob Richard – assistant mixing
- Mike Seaberg – assistant mixing
- Colin Leonard – mastering

== Charts ==
Chart (2020)	Peak position
Canada Hot 100 (Billboard)	97
Global 200 (Billboard)	61
New Zealand Hot Singles (RMNZ)	28
US Billboard Hot 100	30
US Hot R&B/Hip-Hop Songs (Billboard)	13
US R&B/Hip-Hop Airplay (Billboard)	8
US Rhythmic Airplay (Billboard)	11

== Certifications ==
Region	Certification	Certified units/sales
United States (RIAA)	Platinum	1,000,000^{‡}
^{‡} Sales+streaming figures based on certification alone.

== Release history ==
Region	Date	Format	Label	Ref.
Various	October 2, 2020	Digital download; streaming	1501 Certified; 300	
United States	October 6, 2020	Contemporary hit radio	300	
United States	October 6, 2020	Rhythmic contemporary	300	
United States	October 6, 2020	Urban contemporary	300	
