= Elliot Eliantte =

American jeweler (born 1989)

- Born: Elliot Avianne; June 21, 1989 (age 36); United States
- Occupation: Jeweler
- Years active: 2018–present
- Website: eliantte.com

Elliot Avianne (born June 21, 1989), also known as Elliot Eliantte, is an American celebrity jeweler. The founder of Eliantte & Co., he is known for his custom luxury diamond designs for celebrities such as Lil Wayne, Young Thug, and Future.

== Early life ==
Elliot Avianne was born on June 21, 1989, in the United States.

== Career ==
Eliantte first entered the jewelry industry through Avianne & Co., when he was 17. Izzy Avianne, one of the founders of the company, knew him as Avianne's wife used to babysit him when he was younger, and he also worked at her salon in Great Neck, New York. Eliantte started his own company, Eliantte & Co. in 2018, in the Diamond District of Manhattan. His nickname came from a mispronunciation of his surname "Avianne" by rapper Young Scooter when he was recording in the studio.

In 2021, Lil Uzi Vert debuted a $24 million, 10-carat pink diamond on his forehead that was set by Eliantte. That same year, Eliantte also worked with artist Takashi Murakami to design a custom piece for Travis Scott. Kendrick Lamar shouted out Eliantte in a collaboration with Playboi Carti, "Good Credit". Eliantte has created jewelry for Lamar on multiple occasions; he made a Jesus piece that Lamar wore to the 2025 Grammys and an "a" pendant that he wore during his Super Bowl LIX halftime show performance.
