= AI YoungBoy 2 =

Mixtape by YoungBoy Never Broke Again
- Released: October 11, 2019
- Genre: Hip hop
- Length: 55:04
- Label: Never Broke Again; Atlantic
- Producer: 17OnDaTrack; Aura; Beatmonster Marc; Beezo; Benjamin Lasnier; Buddah Bless; Captain Curt; CashMoneyAP; DJ Swift; Dmac; Dremusiq; D-Roc; Drum Dummie; DT; Dubba-AA; Eliot Bohr; E-Trou; Gibbo; Guwap$; Icy Chill Out; India Got Them Beats; J-Bo; jetsonmade; KK McFly; LNKmusic; Louie Bandz; LukasBL; MarcussMuzik; Mario Petersen; Mike Laury; Mike Will Made It; Money Montage; Nick Mira; Olivier Bassil; Skynny; Tahj Money; TnTXD; Todd Pritchard; TooDope; Wheezy; Yung Lan

YoungBoy Never Broke Again chronology
Realer (2018)	AI YoungBoy 2 (2019)	Still Flexin, Still Steppin (2020)

Singles from AI YoungBoy 2
- 1. "Self Control" Released: September 6, 2019; 2. "Slime Mentality" Released: September 6, 2019; 3. "Make No Sense" Released: January 18, 2020

AI YoungBoy 2 is the twelfth full-length mixtape by American rapper YoungBoy Never Broke Again, released on October 11, 2019, by Never Broke Again and Atlantic Records. It features guest appearances from former signee NoCap and signee Quando Rondo of Gaulden's record label, Never Broke Again. The project features production from several established record producers, including Buddah Bless, CashMoneyAP, jetsonmade, Mike Will Made It, Nick Mira, and Wheezy. The mixtape serves as a sequel to YoungBoy's breakout mixtape, AI YoungBoy (2017), alongside a follow-up to his eleventh full-length mixtape, Realer (2018).

AI YoungBoy 2 received positive reviews from music critics, while also appearing atop The New York Times' "Best Albums of 2019" list. It debuted at number one on the US Billboard 200 chart, marking Gaulden's first number one on the chart. It earned 110,000 album-equivalent units, of which 3,000 were pure album sales. Six of the fifteen album tracks debuted on the Billboard Hot 100, and as of 2023, all tracks on the project have been certified gold or higher by the RIAA. The mixtape was supported by three official singles: "Self Control", "Slime Mentality", and "Make No Sense".

== Release and promotion ==
On August 4, 2017, the first part of the "AI YoungBoy" series titled "AI YoungBoy" was released. It reached number 24 on the Billboard 200 and was certified Gold by the RIAA. On August 14, 2019, Gaulden was released from jail and put on house arrest after being in police custody for 90 days following an assassination attempt on his life. With no news of a new project, on October 8, 2019, Gaulden's videographer Louie Knows had taken to his Instagram to share the mixtape's official cover art alongside its release date.

=== Singles ===
On September 1, 2019, Gaulden released the official music video for "Slime Mentality". On September 6, the aforementioned track was bundled with "Self Control" as "The Continuance", released as the album's first and second single. On September 25, while under house arrest, Gaulden released the official music video for "House Arrest Tingz" which failed to appear on the mixtape, however appeared as the eighteenth cut of his second studio album, Top. The album's sixth cut, "Make No Sense" was sent to urban contemporary radio on January 14, 2020, as the album's third single, following a rise in the track's popularity. The track was released alongside its official music video.

== Critical reception ==
Professional ratings
Review scores
Source	Rating
AllMusic	3.5/5 stars

According to The Fader, the mixtape deals with "difficulties he's faced over the past year". Regarding the cover art, Joshua Espinoza of Complex concluded that it depicts "a clear reference to the constant headlines about his legal issues". Writing for HotNewHipHop, Alex Zidel stated that throughout the mixtape, "YoungBoy utilizes his melodious talents and hook-making mastery throughout the bulk of the songs". Zidel wrote that "the lyrical content is incredibly versatile", however, "the general sound of the project may be too uniform". He concluded his review, by writing that the mixtape "is a very enjoyable body of work" and listeners won't regret tuning in. Writing for The New York Times, Jon Caramanica wrote that the album "is a harrowing swirl of personal trauma, treacherous relationships, murderous fantasies and ice-cold bluster". He complimented the project, noting that the project "captures [Gaulden's] gifts well". He wrote that "sometimes, perversely, his vocal affect and his lyrics don’t match up", allowing his verses to feel unpredictable. Citing the album as a "critic's pick", the project as a whole is described as "an excellent work of sing-rap urgency".

Complex ranked the mixtape as the thirty-fourth best project of 2019. Lucas Wisenthal of Complex noted that the mixtape covers Gaulden's "supreme self-confidence" on "Make No Sense" and his introspection and vulnerability on "Lonely Child". Jon Caramanica for The New York Times ranked AI YoungBoy 2 as the third best album of 2019. Caramanica wrote that "the howls of sadness and vitriol" on the album "are almost disorienting".

=== Accolades ===
Publication	List	Rank
Complex	Best Albums of 2019	34
Jon Caramanica for The New York Times	Best Albums of 2019	3

== Commercial performance ==
AI YoungBoy 2 debuted at number one on the US Billboard 200 chart, earning 110,000 album-equivalent units (including 3,000 pure album sales) in its first week. This became YoungBoy's 12th chart entry and his first US number-one album. In its second week, the album dropped to number two on the chart, earning an additional 80,000 units. In its third week, the album dropped to number four on the chart, earning 64,000 more units. In its fourth week, the album climbed to number three on the chart, earning 62,000 units, bringing its four-week total to 316,000 units. On September 22, 2020, the mixtape was certified platinum by the Recording Industry Association of America (RIAA) for combined sales and album-equivalent units of over a million units in the United States. On August 4, 2022, it was certified double platinum.

== Track listing ==
No.	Title	Writer(s)	Producer(s)	Length
1.	"Carter Son"	Kentrell Gaulden; Jacier Pearson; Kaleb Harper; Lachlan Gentle	Aura; KK McFly; Money Montage	2:43
2.	"Time I'm On"	Gaulden; Aaron Lockhart, Jr.; Dennis Neal	Dubba-AA; Louie Bandz	3:12
3.	"Hot Now"	Gaulden; Kevon Lewis; Marcus Gotch, Jr.	Guwaps; MarcussMusik	2:08
4.	"Seeming Like It"	Gaulden; Michael Williams II; Justin Garner	Mike Will Made It; J-Bo	3:04
5.	"Self Control"	Gaulden; Alex Petit; Damion Williams; Tevin Revell	CashMoneyAP; DJ Swift; Drum Dummie	3:05
6.	"Make No Sense"	Gaulden; Tyron Douglas	Buddah Bless	2:28
7.	"Rich As Hell"	Gaulden; Dorian McKnight; Jack Gibson; Daniel Lebrun; Sven Steenbergen; Darren Williams II	Sidepce; Gibbo; D-Roc; 17OnDaTrack	3:35
8.	"Slime Mentality"	Gaulden; Deondre Davis; Dennis Neal, Jr.; Michael Laury; Lockhart, Jr.	Dremusiq; Louie Bandz; Mike Laury; Dubba-AA	3:01
9.	"Head Blown"	Gaulden; Lebrun; Steenbergen	D-Roc; 17OnDaTrack	3:01
10.	"Ranada"	Gaulden; Tahj Morgan; Milan Modi; Olivier Bassil; Benjamin Lasnier; Lukas Leth	jetsonmade; Yung Lan; Olivier Bassil; Benjamin Lasnier; Lukas Leth	2:56
11.	"Lonely Child"	Gaulden; Thomas Horton; Tahj Vaughn; David McDowell	TnTXD; Tahj Money; Dmac	3:37
12.	"Gang Shit"	Gaulden; Bishop Grinnage	Beezo	2:40
13.	"Rebel's Kick It"	Gaulden; Wesley Glass	Wheezy	3:13
14.	"Outta Here Safe" (featuring Quando Rondo and NoCap)	Gaulden; Tyquian Bowman; Kobe Crawford; Gotch, Jr.	MarcussMusik	3:53
15.	"In Control"	Gaulden; India Williams; Laury; Lockhart, Jr.	India Got Them Beats; Mike Laury; Dubba-AA	3:01
16.	"I Don't Know"	Gaulden; Marcus Marsh	Beatmonster Marc	3:05
17.	"Where the Love At"	Gaulden; Revell	Drum Drummie	3:16
18.	"Free Time"	Gaulden; Marsh	Beatmonster Marc	2:55
Total length:				55:04

== Charts ==
=== Weekly charts ===
Chart (2019)	Peak position
Canadian Albums (Billboard)	11
UK Albums (OCC)	84
US Billboard 200	1
US Top R&B/Hip-Hop Albums (Billboard)	1

=== Year-end charts ===
Chart (2019)	Position
US Billboard 200	152
US Top R&B/Hip-Hop Albums (Billboard)	58
Chart (2020)	Position
US Billboard 200	30
US Top R&B/Hip-Hop Albums (Billboard)	22
Chart (2021)	Position
US Billboard 200	131

== Certifications ==
Region	Certification	Certified units/sales
New Zealand (RMNZ)	Gold	7,500^{‡}
United States (RIAA)	2× Platinum	2,000,000^{‡}
^{‡} Sales+streaming figures based on certification alone.

== Release history ==
Release dates and formats for AI YoungBoy 2
Region	Date	Label(s)	Format(s)	Edition(s)	Ref.
Various	October 11, 2019	Never Broke Again; Atlantic	Digital download; streaming	Standard	
United States	January 28, 2022	Never Broke Again; Atlantic	LP	Standard	

== See also ==
- 2019 in hip hop music
- List of Billboard 200 number-one albums of 2019
