= Through the Storm (YoungBoy Never Broke Again song) =

2018 promotional single by YoungBoy Never Broke Again

Promotional single by YoungBoy Never Broke Again

from the album Until Death Call My Name
- Released: June 8, 2018
- Length: 2:43
- Label: Never Broke Again
- Songwriters: Kentrell Gaulden; Michael Laury; Aaron Lockhart Jr.
- Producers: Laury; Dubba-AA

Music video
- "Through the Storm" on YouTube

"Through the Storm" is a song by American rapper YoungBoy Never Broke Again and a promotional single from his debut studio album Until Death Call My Name (2018), appearing as a bonus track. The music video was released in April 2018, before the song was released to streaming services on June 8, 2018. The song was produced by Mike Laury and Dubba-AA.

== Composition ==
The song revolves around NBA YoungBoy's wealth and success as a rapper and him returning to his normal life following legal troubles.

== Music video ==
The music video was directed by Thirty Visuals. It finds YoungBoy in a mansion, where he shows off a stack of cash and spends time with his baby son.

== Certifications ==
Region	Certification	Certified units/sales
New Zealand (RMNZ)	Gold	15,000^{‡}
United States (RIAA)	2× Platinum	2,000,000^{‡}
^{‡} Sales+streaming figures based on certification alone.
