= Coca Michelle =

British nail artist

- Born: Michelle Nguyen; 4 November 1996 (age 29); East London, England
- Occupation: Nail artist
- Known for: Detailed nontraditional nail art; work with Teyana Taylor, Megan Thee Stallion, and Cardi B

Michelle Nguyen (born 4 November 1996), known professionally as Coca Michelle, is a British nail artist. She is known for her detailed style that often includes non-traditional materials and has worked with the likes of Teyana Taylor, Megan Thee Stallion, and Cardi B. She appeared on the 2023 Forbes 30 under 30 list.

== Life and career ==
Coca Michelle was born Michelle Nguyen in East London, England. Her parents were manicurists who eventually opened their own nail salon. Nguyen began to do nails at age six due to her frequent exposure to the business. By age nine she was painting freestyle designs for her parents' clients.

Nguyen studied at the Fashion Institute of Design & Merchandising in Los Angeles and interned in the fashion world. She took a part-time job at a nail salon and then realized she would like to pursue it full-time. She transitioned to doing nails at Laqué Nail Bar and used social media to promote her work. She credits that time with improving her style. Coca specialises in long nails, anime-style art, and nontraditional designs and materials.

In 2017, she was recommended to Teyana Taylor, who hired her; later, Coca Michelle accompanied her on tour.In 2019, she and Taylor opened the salon Junie Bee Nails in Harlem. Other clients include Cardi B, Christina Aguilera, Rosalía, Summer Walker, and Jhené Aiko.

Coca Michelle gained wider prominence as Megan Thee Stallion's key nail artist. Some of the work she did for Megan that gained press attention was a deep sea manicure, claw-like designs for the WAP music video, and gold appliqué body part nails.

Coca resides in Los Angeles.

== Accolades ==
- 2023, Forbes 30 under 30 (Art & Style)
