= Julia Lewis =

American record producer

Benjamin Falik, better known by the alias Julia Lewis (stylized as JULiA LEWiS), is an American record producer and songwriter. He has produced records for Latin, hip-hop, and K-pop artists.

== Early life and education ==
Originally from Berkeley, California, Lewis grew up in a musical household; his mother was a violinist and classical pianist, his father was a violinist, and his older sisters played the piano. Lewis played saxophone, bass, guitar, and piano. He studied jazz as a teenager before expanding to funk, R&B, EDM, and hip-hop.

A student at Occidental College studying psychology and critical race theory, Lewis became interested in beat-making while studying abroad in Fortaleza, Brazil. After graduating, he worked for an advertising agency for five years.

== Career ==
He began uploading music to SoundCloud under the name Julia Lewis. Regarding the pseudonym, he said: "I was looking at the names of predominantly male-driven beat makers, producers, and DJs ... So I thought of this image in my head of a shy girl from Portland who, you know, doesn’t really fit in this rap space as a name."

He signed to San Francisco–based Text Me Records. In 2017, he collaborated with Mr. Carmack, Mikos Da Gawd, and Elujay on the track "On the Regular". Also in 2017, he produced a remix of Terror Jr's "Trust"; Sydney Gore of Nylon wrote that Lewis turned a "slow song into a juicy jam with sinister synthesizers, slow-motion wind-ups, and chopped vocals that drip with seduction". In 2018, as part of a mixtape with other Bay Area artists, he released the song "Potential" featuring Rexx Life Raj, Ciscero, and Mikos Da Gawd.

Genius described Lewis's "big break" as the 2019 release "West Coast" by G-Eazy featuring Blueface. His participation in the song's production led him to the management company the Revels Group. In February 2020, Lewis became the first artist signed to the joint venture of Atlas Music Publishing and Quincy Jones Productions. In September 2020, he produced NBA Youngboy's "Kacey Talk". In 2022, he produced Bad Bunny and Arcángel's "La Jumpa" with Mag.

In February 2024, Lewis signed a global publishing administration deal with Kobalt Music Group. At the 2024 Latin Grammy Awards, Lewis was nominated for Record of the Year as a producer on Anitta's "Mil Veces". At the 2025 Latin Grammy Awards, Lewis won Best Urban Song as a producer on Bad Bunny's "DTMF". The song was also nominated for Record of the Year and Song of the Year at the Latin Grammys. In 2026, it was nominated for Record of the Year and Song of the Year at the Grammy Awards.

In 2025, Lewis began working with South Korean entertainment corporation Hybe, producing songs for its artists including &Team, Enhypen, Yeonjun and Katseye. Lewis produced remixes of "Gabriela" and "Gameboy" for the remix album of Katseye's Beautiful Chaos. He has also worked with Venezuelan group Rawayana, Japanese rapper Yuki Chiba, and Colombian singer Feid.

== Personal life ==
Lewis lives in the Encino neighborhood of Los Angeles. He is married and has a child.
