= House Arrest Tingz =

2018 song by YoungBoy Never Broke Again

Song by YoungBoy Never Broke Again

from the album Top
- Released: September 25, 2019
- Recorded: 2019
- Length: 2:48
- Label: Never Broke Again; Atlantic
- Songwriters: Kentrell Gaulden; Brian Carroll; Tevin Revell
- Producer: Drum Dummie

Music video
- "House Arrest Tingz" on YouTube

"House Arrest Tingz" is a song by American rapper YoungBoy Never Broke Again from his second studio album Top (2020). It was produced by Drum Drummie.

== Music video ==
The song was originally released exclusively on YouTube as a music video on September 25, 2019. During the time of the filming, NBA YoungBoy was under house arrest. The video sees him with friends and family, roaming around in his yard and having a water slide there, bonding with one of his sons, and meeting with his parole officer.

== Charts ==
Chart (2020)	Peak position
US Bubbling Under Hot 100 (Billboard)	16

== Certifications ==
Region	Certification	Certified units/sales
United States (RIAA)	3× Platinum	3,000,000^{‡}
^{‡} Sales+streaming figures based on certification alone.
