= GloRilla discography =

American rapper discography

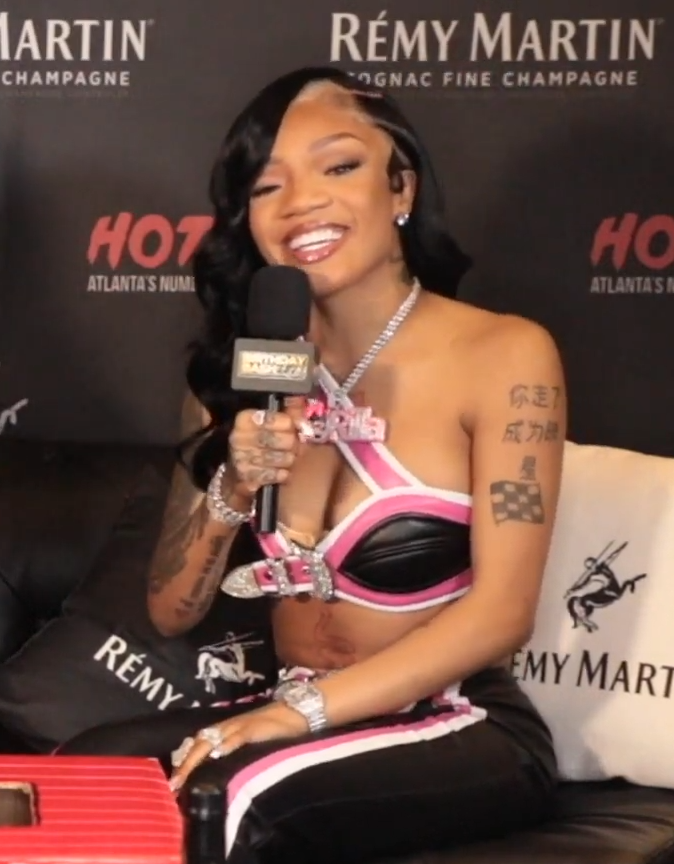
- Studio albums: 1
- Singles: 19
- Music videos: 8
- Mixtapes: 2
- EPs: 2
- Compilations: 2

American rapper GloRilla has released one studio album, two extended plays, two mixtapes, nineteen singles, and eight music videos.

== Albums ==
=== Studio albums ===
List of studio albums, with selected chart positions and certifications
Title	Album details	Peak chart positions			Certifications
Title	Album details	US	US R&B /HH	US Rap	Certifications
Glorious	Released: October 11, 2024; Label: CMG, Interscope; Format: Digital download, streaming	5	2	2	RIAA: Platinum; RMNZ: Gold

=== Compilation albums ===
List of compilation albums, with selected chart positions
Title	Album details	Peak chart positions		
Title	Album details	US	US R&B /HH	US Rap
Gangsta Art (with CMG the Label)	Released: July 15, 2022; Label: CMG, Interscope; Format: Digital download, streaming	11	6	3
Gangsta Art 2 (with CMG the Label)	Released: September 29, 2023; Label: CMG, Interscope; Format: Digital download, streaming	78	31	25

== Mixtapes ==
List of mixtapes, with selected chart positions and certifications
Title	Mixtape details	Peak chart positions			Certifications
Title	Mixtape details	US	US R&B /HH	US Rap	Certifications
Most Likely Up Next	Released: June 24, 2019; Label: Self-released; Format: Digital download, streaming	—	—	—	
Ehhthang Ehhthang	Released: April 5, 2024; Label: CMG, Interscope; Format: Digital download, streaming	18	4	3	RIAA: Gold
"—" denotes a recording that did not chart or was not released in that territory.

== Extended plays ==
List of extended plays, with selected chart positions and certifications
Title	EP details	Peak chart positions			Certifications
Title	EP details	US	US R&B /HH	US Rap	Certifications
P Status	Released: May 23, 2020; Label: Self-released; Format: Digital download, streaming	—	—	—	
Anyways, Life's Great	Released: November 11, 2022; Label: CMG, Interscope; Format: Digital download, streaming	11	5	4	RIAA: Gold
"—" denotes a recording that did not chart or was not released in that territory.

== Singles ==
=== As lead artist ===
List of singles as lead artist, with selected chart positions, showing year released, certifications and album name
Title	Year	Peak chart positions							Certifications	Album
Title	Year	US	US R&B /HH	US Rap	CAN	NZ	UK	WW	Certifications	Album
"Afford Me" (featuring JaTavia Akiaa)	2019	—	—	—	—	—	—	—		Non-album singles
"Outside" (featuring Niki Pooh)	2021	—	—	—	—	—	—	—		Non-album singles
"Don't Kno (Remix)"	2022	—	—	—	—	—	—	—		Non-album singles
"F.N.F. (Let's Go)" (with Hitkidd or remix also featuring Latto and JT)	2022	42	11	9	—	—	—	—	RIAA: Platinum	Anyways, Life's Great
"Big Shit"	2022	—	—	—	—	—	—	—		Non-album single
"Tomorrow" (solo or featuring Cardi B)	2022	9	3	2	78	— (Note: "Tomorrow 2" did not enter the NZ Top 40 Singles Chart, but peaked at number 22 on the NZ Hot Singles Chart.)	—	39	RIAA: 4× Platinum; MC: Gold; RMNZ: Gold	Anyways, Life's Great
"Blessed"	2022	— (Note: "Blessed" did not enter the Billboard Hot 100 but peaked at number 8 on the Bubbling Under Hot 100 chart.)	37	—	—	—	—	—	RIAA: Gold	Anyways, Life's Great
"Nut Quick"	2022	— (Note: "Nut Quick" did not enter the Billboard Hot 100 but peaked at number 23 on the Bubbling Under Hot 100 chart.)	—	—	—	—	—	—		Anyways, Life's Great
"On Wat U On" (with Moneybagg Yo)	2023	56	21	9	—	—	—	—	RIAA: Platinum	Hard to Love
"Internet Trolls"	2023	— (Note: "Internet Trolls" did not enter the Billboard Hot 100 but peaked at number 22 on the Bubbling Under Hot 100 chart.)	— (Note: "Internet Trolls" did not enter the Hot R&B/Hip-Hop Songs chart, but peaked at number 21 on the R&B/Hip-Hop Airplay chart.)	—	—	—	—	—		Non-album single
"Ex's (Phatnall Remix)" (with Lil Durk)	2023	—	40	—	—	—	—	—		Anyways, Life's Great
"Lick or Sum"	2023	—	— (Note: "Lick or Sum" did not enter the Hot R&B/Hip-Hop Songs chart, but peaked at number 21 on the R&B/Hip-Hop Airplay chart.)	—	—	—	—	—		Non-album singles
"Wrong One" (with Gloss Up and Slimeroni, featuring K. Carbon, Aleza, and Tay Keith)	2023	—	—	—	—	—	—	—		Non-album singles
"Yeah Glo!"	2024	28	7	5	88	27	—	159	RIAA: 3× Platinum; RMNZ: Platinum	Ehhthang Ehhthang
"Wanna Be" (with Megan Thee Stallion or remix also with Cardi B)	2024	11	5	4	80	— (Note: "Wanna Be" did not enter the NZ Top 40 Singles Chart, but peaked at number 25 on the NZ Hot Singles Chart.)	—	38	RIAA: 2× Platinum; RMNZ: Gold	Ehhthang Ehhthang
"TGIF"	2024	22	4	2	—	— (Note: "TGIF" did not enter the NZ Top 40 Singles Chart, but peaked at number 24 on the NZ Hot Singles Chart.)	—	104	RIAA: 2× Platinum; RMNZ: Gold	Glorious
"Hollon"	2024	48	12	9	—	—	—	—	RIAA: Gold	Glorious
"Whatchu Kno About Me" (with Sexyy Red)	2024	17	3	2	59	30	93	62	RIAA: 2× Platinum; RMNZ: Platinum	Glorious
"Typa"	2025	42	10	6	—	— (Note: "Typa" did not enter the NZ Top 40 Singles Chart, but peaked at number 14 on the NZ Hot Singles Chart.)	—	—		TBA
"March"	2025	—	—	—	—	—	—	—		TBA
"Shyne" (with Travis Scott)	2025	93	31	17	92	—	—	—		JackBoys 2
"Special"	2025	—	—	—	—	—	—	—		TBA
"Mane" (with Pooh Shiesty)	2026	— (Note: "Mane" did not enter the Billboard Hot 100 but peaked at number 9 on the Bubbling Under Hot 100 chart.)	36	24	—	—	—	—		TBA
"—" denotes a recording that did not chart or was not released in that territory.

=== As featured artist ===
List of singles as featured artist, with selected chart positions, showing year released, certifications and album name
Title	Year	Peak chart positions								Certifications	Album
Title	Year	US	US R&B /HH	US Rap	AUS	CAN	NZ	UK	WW	Certifications	Album
"Set the Tone Part 2" (Hitkidd featuring Aleza, GloRilla, Gloss Up, K Carbon, and Slimeroni)	2021	—	—	—	—	—	—	—	—		Set the Tone
"Hot Potato" (Hitkidd featuring Aleza, GloRilla, Gloss Up, K Carbon, and Slimeroni)	2021	—	—	—	—	—	—	—	—		Set the Tone
"Better Thangs (Remix)" (Ciara featuring Summer Walker and GloRilla)	2022	—	—	—	—	—	—	—	—		Non-album singles
"FTCU" (Latto featuring GloRilla and Gangsta Boo)	2022	—	—	—	—	—	—	—	—		Non-album singles
"Leave the Club" (Don Toliver featuring GloRilla and Lil Durk)	2023	— (Note: "Leave the Club" did not enter the Billboard Hot 100 but peaked at number 5 on the Bubbling Under Hot 100 chart.)	43	—	—	—	—	—	—		Love Sick
"Outside" (G Herbo featuring GloRilla and Mello Buckzz)	2023	—	—	—	—	—	—	—	—		Strictly 4 My Fans 2
"Keep Dat Nigga (Part 2)" (Icandy featuring GloRilla, Kaliii, and Big Boss Vette)	2023	—	—	—	—	—	—	—	—		Non-album singles
"In the Truck" (FendiDa Rappa featuring GloRilla)	2023	—	—	—	—	—	—	—	—		Non-album singles
"Embarrassing" (YTB Fatt featuring GloRilla)	2023	—	—	—	—	—	—	—	—		Non-album singles
"Finesse" (BossMan Dlow featuring GloRilla)	2024	— (Note: "Finesse" did not enter the Billboard Hot 100 but peaked at number 1 on the Bubbling Under Hot 100 chart.)	37	—	—	—	—	—	—	RIAA: Platinum	Non-album singles
"Get in There" (Real Boston Richey featuring GloRilla)	2024	—	—	—	—	—	—	—	—		Richey Rich
"Sticky" (Tyler, the Creator featuring GloRilla, Sexyy Red, and Lil Wayne)	2024	10	1	1	33	26	25	57	23	RIAA: 3× Platinum; BPI: Silver; MC: Platinum; RMNZ: Platinum	Chromakopia
"In My Bag" (Flo featuring GloRilla)	2024	—	— (Note: "In My Bag" did not enter the Hot R&B/Hip-Hop Songs chart, but peaked at number 16 on the Hot R&B Songs chart.)	—	—	—	— (Note: "In My Bag" did not enter the NZ Top 40 Singles Chart, but peaked at number 31 on the NZ Hot Singles Chart.)	—	—		Access All Areas
"Lay Down (Remix)" (OMB Peezy featuring GloRilla)	2024	—	—	—	—	—	— (Note: "Lay Down (Remix)" did not enter the NZ Top 40 Singles Chart, but peaked at number 12 on the NZ Hot Singles Chart.)	—	—		Drifting Away
"ILBB2 (Remix)" (Jorjiana featuring GloRilla)	2025	—	—	—	—	—	—	—	—		Project 219
"Can You Please" (Gelo featuring GloRilla)	2025	— (Note: "Can You Please" did not enter the Billboard Hot 100 but peaked at number 12 on the Bubbling Under Hot 100 chart.)	37	21	—	—	— (Note: "Can You Please" did not enter the NZ Top 40 Singles Chart, but peaked at number 10 on the NZ Hot Singles Chart.)	—	—		League of My Own
"Killin' It Girl" (J-Hope featuring GloRilla)	2025	40	—	—	—	54	— (Note: "Killin' It Girl" did not enter the NZ Top 40 Singles Chart, but peaked at number 5 on the NZ Hot Singles Chart.)	30	3	MC: Gold	Non-album single
"GOMF" (Latto featuring GloRilla)	2026	90	28	12	—	—	—	—	—		Big Mama
"This Time" (Kirk Franklin featuring GloRilla)	2026	— (Note: "This Time" did not enter the Billboard Hot 100 but peaked at number 20 on the Bubbling Under Hot 100 chart.)	—	—	—	—	—	—	—		I Am What I Am
"—" denotes a recording that did not chart or was not released in that territory.

== Other charted and certified songs ==
List of songs, with selected chart positions, showing year released, certifications and album name
Title	Year	Peak chart positions				Certifications	Album
Title	Year	US	US R&B /HH	US Rap	NZ Hot	Certifications	Album
"Bop" (Big Boogie and DJ Drama featuring GloRilla)	2024	—	48	—	—	RIAA: Platinum	Redrum Wizard (Gangsta Grillz)
"All Dere" (featuring Moneybagg Yo)	2024	—	—	—	—	RIAA: Gold	Ehhthang Ehhthang
"Accent" (Megan Thee Stallion featuring GloRilla)	2024	—	42	—	—		Megan
"Procedure" (with Latto)	2024	— (Note: "Procedure" did not enter the Billboard Hot 100 but peaked at number 1 on the Bubbling Under Hot 100 chart.)	41	—	—		Glorious
"Stop Playing"	2024	— (Note: "Stop Playing" did not enter the Billboard Hot 100 but peaked at number 21 on the Bubbling Under Hot 100 chart.)	—	—	—		Glorious
"Don't Deserve" (with Muni Long)	2024	— (Note: "Don't Deserve" did not enter the Billboard Hot 100 but peaked at number 24 on the Bubbling Under Hot 100 chart.)	—	—	—		Glorious
"How I Look" (with Megan Thee Stallion)	2024	90	33	—	—		Glorious
"Step" (with BossMan Dlow)	2024	— (Note: "Step" did not enter the Billboard Hot 100 but peaked at number 19 on the Bubbling Under Hot 100 chart.)	—	—	—		Glorious
"Let Her Cook"	2024	— (Note: "Let Her Cook" did not enter the Billboard Hot 100 but peaked at number 12 on the Bubbling Under Hot 100 chart.)	45	—	—	RIAA: Gold	Glorious
"I Luv Her" (with T-Pain)	2024	70	18	13	9	RIAA: Platinum; RMNZ: Gold	Glorious
"Never Find" (with K. Carbon)	2024	—	—	—	37		Glorious
"Shake Dat Ass (Twerk Song)" (BossMan Dlow featuring GloRilla)	2024	—	—	—	—	RIAA: Platinum	Dlow Curry
"Redbone" (with Lil Baby)	2025	53	14	11	—		WHAM
"She Got It" (with Teddy Swims and Coco Jones)	2025	—	— (Note: "She Got It" did not enter the Hot R&B/Hip-Hop Songs chart, but peaked at number 22 on the Hot R&B Songs chart.)	—	—		I've Tried Everything but Therapy (Part 2)
"Baller" (with Summer Walker, Sexyy Red, and Monaleo)	2025	96	23	13	—		Finally Over It
"Dog Shit" (with 21 Savage)	2025	93	16	12	—		What Happened to the Streets?
"—" denotes a recording that did not chart or was not released in that territory.

== Guest appearances ==
List of non-single guest appearances, with other performing artists, showing year released and album name
Title	Year	Other artist(s)	Album
"Just Say That"	2022	Duke Deuce	Crunkstar
"Bop"	2024	Big Boogie, DJ Drama	Redrum Wizard (Gangsta Grillz)
"Accent"	2024	Megan Thee Stallion	Megan
"Bad Kids"	2024	Polo G	Hood Poet
"Leave My Baby Tonight"	2024	Muni Long	Revenge
"Shake Dat Ass (Twerk Song)"	2024	BossMan Dlow	Dlow Curry
"Redbone"	2025	Lil Baby	WHAM
"She Got It"	2025	Teddy Swims, Coco Jones	I've Tried Everything but Therapy (Part 2)
"Know About Me"	2025	Halle	Love?... or Something Like It
"Baller"	2025	Summer Walker, Sexyy Red, and Monaleo	Finally Over It
"Dog Shit"	2025	21 Savage	What Happened to the Streets?
"Call Your Name"	2026	Chris Brown, Sexyy Red	Brown
