= Tomorrow 2 =

Single by GloRilla and Cardi B

from the EP Anyways, Life's Great
- Released: September 23, 2022
- Genre: Crunk
- Length: 3:29
- Label: CMG; Interscope
- Songwriters: Antonio Anderson Jr.; Belcalis Almanzar; Gloria Woods; Javaan Anderson; Jorden Thorpe
- Producer: Macaroni Toni

GloRilla singles chronology
"F.N.F. (Let's Go) [Remix]" (2022)	"Tomorrow 2" (2022)	"Nut Quick" (2022)

Cardi B singles chronology
"Hot Shit" (2022)	"Tomorrow 2" (2022)	"Put It on da Floor Again" (2023)

Music video
- "Tomorrow 2" on YouTube

"Tomorrow 2" is a song by American rappers GloRilla and Cardi B. It was released on September 23, 2022, as the third single from the former's debut extended play (EP) Anyways, Life's Great. It is a remix of the former's earlier song, "Tomorrow".

"Tomorrow 2" peaked at number 9 on the Billboard Hot 100, marking GloRilla's first top ten hit and Cardi B's eleventh, and was certified 4× Platinum in the United States.

== Composition ==
The original version of "Tomorrow" features piano chords and bass in the production. GloRilla raps in an aggressive manner, while lyrically she dismisses her detractors and raps about her good qualities, keeping her circle close but being "kinda ratchet still", as well as her status and standards with an optimistic tone. On the remix, Cardi B joins GloRilla to also target her haters and brags about being better than others. She acknowledges rapper Ice Spice by interpolating her song "Munch (Feelin' U)".

== Critical reception ==
"Tomorrow 2" received universal acclaim from critics. Both Eddie Fu of Consequence and Tom Briehan of Stereogum praised the compatibility of GloRilla and Cardi B's collaboration. Breihan also called the latter's shoutout to Ice Spice to be "worth quoting". Mankaprr Conteh of Rolling Stone wrote, "While GloRilla's baddie quips can be pretty funny, Cardi B brings even more levity to the song with her characteristic humor." Andrew Unterberger of Billboard highlighted Cardi's verse in particular, calling it "her most vicious guest verse in years".

"Tomorrow 2" was listed on numerous year-end lists for 2022, including that of HipHopDX, which listed the track as the Best Hip-Hop Collaboration of 2022 and noted that "there may not have been a more perfectly paired Hip Hop duo this year" than GloRilla and Cardi. "Tomorrow 2" was also featured on Rolling Stone's and Billboard's 100 Best Songs of 2022 lists, with it placing as the highest-listed song by a female rapper on the latter.

== Music video ==
The music video for "Tomorrow 2" was directed by Diesel Filmz and released on September 23, 2022. In it, GloRilla and her friends go wild in the New York City streets. She is seen ghost riding in neon cars while wearing a ski mask, and dancing with her friends on stoops and in a bodega, where they grab snacks as well (GloRilla gets some Takis). They continue dancing and twerking through the city's subway station and in the train, also pole-dancing on subway poles. Later, Cardi B joins GloRilla on a rooftop, and has a house party with GloRilla and her crew. The video for "Tomorrow 2" received a nomination for Best Hip Hop at the 2023 MTV Video Music Awards, but lost to Nicki Minaj's "Super Freaky Girl".

== Live performances ==
On November 20, 2022, GloRilla and Cardi B performed "Tomorrow 2" at the American Music Awards. On February 22, 2023, GloRilla performed the song with Cardi B, who appeared as a surprise guest at her concert in New York. On June 4, Cardi B brought out GloRilla for a performance of "Tomorrow 2" during her set as the headliner of the New York festival Summer Jam.

== Awards and nominations ==
Awards and nominations for "Tomorrow 2"
Year	Ceremony	Category	Result	Ref.
2023	BET Awards	Video of the Year	Nominated	
2023	BET Awards	Best Collaboration	Nominated	
2023	BET Hip Hop Awards	Song of the Year	Nominated	
2023	BET Hip Hop Awards	Best Hip Hop Video	Nominated	
2023	BET Hip Hop Awards	Best Collaboration	Nominated	
2023	BET Hip Hop Awards	Best Featured Verse	Nominated	
2023	HipHopDX Awards	Best Collaboration of the Year	Won	
2023	MTV Video Music Awards	Best Hip-Hop	Nominated	

== Charts ==
=== Weekly charts ===
Weekly chart performance for "Tomorrow 2"
Chart (2022–2023)	Peak position
Canada Hot 100 (Billboard)	78
Global 200 (Billboard)	39
Greece International (IFPI)	96
New Zealand Hot Singles (RMNZ)	22
US Billboard Hot 100	9
US Hot R&B/Hip-Hop Songs (Billboard)	3
US R&B/Hip-Hop Airplay (Billboard)	1
US Rhythmic Airplay (Billboard)	5

=== Year-end charts ===
2022 year-end chart performance for "Tomorrow 2"
Chart (2022)	Position
US Hot R&B/Hip-Hop Songs (Billboard)	66

2023 year-end chart performance for "Tomorrow 2"
Chart (2023)	Position
US Billboard Hot 100	70
US Hot R&B/Hip-Hop Songs (Billboard)	21
US Rhythmic (Billboard)	24

== Certifications ==
Certifications for "Tomorrow 2"
Region	Certification	Certified units/sales
Canada (Music Canada)	Gold	40,000^{‡}
New Zealand (RMNZ)	Gold	15,000^{‡}
United States (RIAA)	4× Platinum	4,000,000^{‡}
^{‡} Sales+streaming figures based on certification alone.
