= List of Billboard Hot R&B/Hip-Hop Songs number ones of 2025 =

This page lists the songs that reached number one on the overall Billboard Hot R&B/Hip-Hop Songs, Hot R&B Songs, Hot Rap Songs and R&B/Hip-Hop Airplay charts in 2025. The R&B Songs and Rap Songs charts partly serve as respective distillations of the overall R&B/Hip-Hop Songs chart, apart from the R&B/Hip-Hop Airplay chart which serve as a forefront for radio and video airplay counts.

== Chart history ==
Key
| † | Indicates best-performing song of 2025 |

| Issue date | Hot R&B/Hip-Hop Songs | Artist(s) | Hot R&B Songs | Artist(s) | Hot Rap Songs | Artist(s) | R&B/Hip-Hop Airplay | Artist(s) | Ref. |
|---|---|---|---|---|---|---|---|---|---|
| January 4 | "Luther" † | Kendrick Lamar and SZA | "30 for 30" | SZA and Kendrick Lamar | "Luther" † | Kendrick Lamar and SZA | "TGIF" | GloRilla | |
| January 11 | "Luther" † | Kendrick Lamar and SZA | "Timeless" † | The Weeknd and Playboi Carti | "Luther" † | Kendrick Lamar and SZA | "TGIF" | GloRilla | |
| January 18 | "Luther" † | Kendrick Lamar and SZA | "Timeless" † | The Weeknd and Playboi Carti | "Luther" † | Kendrick Lamar and SZA | "TGIF" | GloRilla | |
| January 25 | "Luther" † | Kendrick Lamar and SZA | "Timeless" † | The Weeknd and Playboi Carti | "Luther" † | Kendrick Lamar and SZA | "Whatchu Kno About Me" | GloRilla and Sexyy Red | |
| February 1 | "Luther" † | Kendrick Lamar and SZA | "Timeless" † | The Weeknd and Playboi Carti | "Luther" † | Kendrick Lamar and SZA | "Whatchu Kno About Me" | GloRilla and Sexyy Red | |
| February 8 | "4x4" | Travis Scott | "Timeless" † | The Weeknd and Playboi Carti | "4x4" | Travis Scott | "Whatchu Kno About Me" | GloRilla and Sexyy Red | |
| February 15 | "Luther" † | Kendrick Lamar and SZA | "Timeless" † | The Weeknd and Playboi Carti | "Luther" † | Kendrick Lamar and SZA | "Residuals" † | Chris Brown | |
| February 22 | "Not Like Us" | Kendrick Lamar | "30 for 30" | SZA and Kendrick Lamar | "Not Like Us" | Kendrick Lamar | "Residuals" † | Chris Brown | |
| March 1 | "Luther" † | Kendrick Lamar and SZA | "30 for 30" | SZA and Kendrick Lamar | "Luther" † | Kendrick Lamar and SZA | "Residuals" † | Chris Brown | |
| March 8 | "Luther" † | Kendrick Lamar and SZA | "30 for 30" | SZA and Kendrick Lamar | "Luther" † | Kendrick Lamar and SZA | "Luther" | Kendrick Lamar and SZA | |
| March 15 | "Luther" † | Kendrick Lamar and SZA | "30 for 30" | SZA and Kendrick Lamar | "Luther" † | Kendrick Lamar and SZA | "Luther" | Kendrick Lamar and SZA | |
| March 22 | "Luther" † | Kendrick Lamar and SZA | "30 for 30" | SZA and Kendrick Lamar | "Luther" † | Kendrick Lamar and SZA | "Luther" | Kendrick Lamar and SZA | |
| March 29 | "Luther" † | Kendrick Lamar and SZA | "Timeless" † | The Weeknd and Playboi Carti | "Luther" † | Kendrick Lamar and SZA | "Luther" | Kendrick Lamar and SZA | |
| April 5 | "Luther" † | Kendrick Lamar and SZA | "Timeless" † | The Weeknd and Playboi Carti | "Luther" † | Kendrick Lamar and SZA | "Luther" | Kendrick Lamar and SZA | |
| April 12 | "Luther" † | Kendrick Lamar and SZA | "Mutt" | Leon Thomas | "Luther" † | Kendrick Lamar and SZA | "Luther" | Kendrick Lamar and SZA | |
| April 19 | "Luther" † | Kendrick Lamar and SZA | "Mutt" | Leon Thomas | "Luther" † | Kendrick Lamar and SZA | "Luther" | Kendrick Lamar and SZA | |
| April 26 | "Luther" † | Kendrick Lamar and SZA | "Mutt" | Leon Thomas | "Luther" † | Kendrick Lamar and SZA | "Luther" | Kendrick Lamar and SZA | |
| May 3 | "Luther" † | Kendrick Lamar and SZA | "Mutt" | Leon Thomas | "Luther" † | Kendrick Lamar and SZA | "Luther" | Kendrick Lamar and SZA | |
| May 10 | "Luther" † | Kendrick Lamar and SZA | "Mutt" | Leon Thomas | "Luther" † | Kendrick Lamar and SZA | "Luther" | Kendrick Lamar and SZA | |
| May 17 | "Luther" † | Kendrick Lamar and SZA | "Mutt" | Leon Thomas | "Luther" † | Kendrick Lamar and SZA | "Luther" | Kendrick Lamar and SZA | |
| May 24 | "Luther" † | Kendrick Lamar and SZA | "Timeless" † | The Weeknd and Playboi Carti | "Luther" † | Kendrick Lamar and SZA | "Luther" | Kendrick Lamar and SZA | |
| May 31 | "Luther" † | Kendrick Lamar and SZA | "Mutt" | Leon Thomas | "Luther" † | Kendrick Lamar and SZA | "Luther" | Kendrick Lamar and SZA | |
| June 7 | "Luther" † | Kendrick Lamar and SZA | "Mutt" | Leon Thomas | "Luther" † | Kendrick Lamar and SZA | "Luther" | Kendrick Lamar and SZA | |
| June 14 | "Luther" † | Kendrick Lamar and SZA | "Mutt" | Leon Thomas | "Luther" † | Kendrick Lamar and SZA | "Luther" | Kendrick Lamar and SZA | |
| June 21 | "Luther" † | Kendrick Lamar and SZA | "Mutt" | Leon Thomas | "Luther" † | Kendrick Lamar and SZA | "Residuals" † | Chris Brown | |
| June 28 | "Luther" † | Kendrick Lamar and SZA | "Mutt" | Leon Thomas | "Luther" † | Kendrick Lamar and SZA | "Luther" | Kendrick Lamar and SZA | |
| July 5 | "Luther" † | Kendrick Lamar and SZA | "Mutt" | Leon Thomas | "Luther" † | Kendrick Lamar and SZA | "Residuals" † | Chris Brown | |
| July 12 | "Luther" † | Kendrick Lamar and SZA | "Mutt" | Leon Thomas | "Luther" † | Kendrick Lamar and SZA | "Residuals" † | Chris Brown | |
| July 19 | "What Did I Miss?" | Drake | "Mutt" | Leon Thomas | "What Did I Miss?" | Drake | "Mutt" | Leon Thomas | |
| July 26 | "What Did I Miss?" | Drake | "Yukon" | Justin Bieber | "What Did I Miss?" | Drake | "Mutt" | Leon Thomas | |
| August 2 | "Luther" † | Kendrick Lamar and SZA | "Mutt" | Leon Thomas | "Luther" † | Kendrick Lamar and SZA | "Mutt" | Leon Thomas | |
| August 9 | "Luther" † | Kendrick Lamar and SZA | "Mutt" | Leon Thomas | "Luther" † | Kendrick Lamar and SZA | "Mutt" | Leon Thomas | |
| August 16 | "Luther" † | Kendrick Lamar and SZA | "Mutt" | Leon Thomas | "Luther" † | Kendrick Lamar and SZA | "Mutt" | Leon Thomas | |
| August 23 | "Mutt" | Leon Thomas | "Mutt" | Leon Thomas | "Luther" † | Kendrick Lamar and SZA | "Mutt" | Leon Thomas | |
| August 30 | "Mutt" | Leon Thomas | "Mutt" | Leon Thomas | "Luther" † | Kendrick Lamar and SZA | "Mutt" | Leon Thomas | |
| September 6 | "Mutt" | Leon Thomas | "Mutt" | Leon Thomas | "All the Way" | BigXthaPlug featuring Bailey Zimmerman | "Residuals" † | Chris Brown | |
| September 13 | "Mutt" | Leon Thomas | "Mutt" | Leon Thomas | "Luther" † | Kendrick Lamar and SZA | "Mutt" | Leon Thomas | |
| September 20 | "Mutt" | Leon Thomas | "Mutt" | Leon Thomas | "Luther" † | Kendrick Lamar and SZA | "Residuals" † | Chris Brown | |
| September 27 | "Mutt" | Leon Thomas | "Mutt" | Leon Thomas | "Luther" † | Kendrick Lamar and SZA | "Residuals" † | Chris Brown | |
| October 4 | "Mutt" | Leon Thomas | "Mutt" | Leon Thomas | "Safe" | Cardi B featuring Kehlani | "Mutt" | Leon Thomas | |
| October 11 | "Mutt" | Leon Thomas | "Mutt" | Leon Thomas | "Luther" † | Kendrick Lamar and SZA | "Mutt" | Leon Thomas | |
| October 18 | "Mutt" | Leon Thomas | "Mutt" | Leon Thomas | "Luther" † | Kendrick Lamar and SZA | "Mutt" | Leon Thomas | |
| October 25 | "Mutt" | Leon Thomas | "Mutt" | Leon Thomas | "Luther" † | Kendrick Lamar and SZA | "Mutt" | Leon Thomas | |
| November 1 | "Mutt" | Leon Thomas | "Mutt" | Leon Thomas | "Luther" † | Kendrick Lamar and SZA | "Mutt" | Leon Thomas | |
| November 8 | "Folded" | Kehlani | "Folded" | Kehlani | "Luther" † | Kendrick Lamar and SZA | "It Depends" | Chris Brown featuring Bryson Tiller | |
| November 15 | "Folded" | Kehlani | "Folded" | Kehlani | "Luther" † | Kendrick Lamar and SZA | "It Depends" | Chris Brown featuring Bryson Tiller | |
| November 22 | "Mutt" | Leon Thomas | "Mutt" | Leon Thomas | "Luther" † | Kendrick Lamar and SZA | "It Depends" | Chris Brown featuring Bryson Tiller | |
| November 29 | "Mutt" | Leon Thomas | "Mutt" | Leon Thomas | "Luther" † | Kendrick Lamar and SZA | "It Depends" | Chris Brown featuring Bryson Tiller | |
| December 6 | "Mutt" | Leon Thomas | "Mutt" | Leon Thomas | "Luther" † | Kendrick Lamar and SZA | "It Depends" | Chris Brown featuring Bryson Tiller | |
| December 13 | "Mutt" | Leon Thomas | "Mutt" | Leon Thomas | "Luther" † | Kendrick Lamar and SZA | "It Depends" | Chris Brown featuring Bryson Tiller | |
| December 20 | "Mutt" | Leon Thomas | "Mutt" | Leon Thomas | "Luther" † | Kendrick Lamar and SZA | "It Depends" | Chris Brown featuring Bryson Tiller | |
| December 27 | "FDO" | Pooh Shiesty | "Mutt" | Leon Thomas | "FDO" | Pooh Shiesty | "It Depends" | Chris Brown featuring Bryson Tiller | |

== See also ==
- 2025 in American music
- 2025 in hip hop music
- Billboard Year-End Hot R&B/Hip-Hop Songs of 2025
- List of Billboard Hot 100 number ones of 2025
- List of Billboard number-one R&B/hip-hop albums of 2025
