= Gangsta Art =

Compilation album by various artists
- Released: July 15, 2022
- Genre: Hip-hop
- Length: 1:16:07
- Label: CMG; Interscope
- Producer: 30 Roc; Audiovista; AyoPeeb; Banger Slanger; BeatzMikey; BennettMakingHits; Boobie; Carter; Carter Z; Dave-O; David Morse; DJ Junnie Baby; Dos Dias; Drumgod; ENRGY; Eric Grimes Jr.; Flex on the Beat; Foreverolling; Gabriel Melikardi Decastro; Haze; Helluva; HitmanAudio; Hoops; Jahk; JB Sauced Up; Julian Cannon; Julien Anderson; KJLetTheBeatKnock; LMC; Macaroni Toni; Mario Garcia; Mikka; Mitchell Dean; Mook; MStarOnTheBeat; Murda Beatz; P.F. Sloan; Polo; Scotty OTH; Skywalker OG; Soto; SoundsByBreezy; Tahj Money; Tay Keith; TayTayMadeIt; Tymaz; Xan; YC

CMG the Label chronology
Gangsta Art (2022)	Gangsta Art 2 (2023)

Singles from Gangsta Art
- 1. "Rocky Road" Released: May 16, 2022; 2. "See Wat I'm Sayin" Released: May 27, 2022

Professional ratings
Review scores
Source	Rating
AllMusic	3.5/5 stars
HipHopDX	3.6/5

Gangsta Art is a compilation album by American Memphis-based hip-hop record label Collective Music Group. It was released on July 15, 2022, through Interscope Records.

The production was helmed by 48 different record producers, including Foreverolling, DrumGod, Helluva, Jahk, Julien Anderson, SoundsByBreezy, Tay Keith, 30 Roc and Murda Beatz among others.

It features contributions from Yo Gotti, EST Gee, Moneybagg Yo, 42 Dugg, Blac Youngsta, Mozzy, Big Boogie, Lil Poppa, Lehla Samia, Lil Migo, Tripstar, 10Percent, Arabian McWilson, Big30, BlocBoy JB, Coi Leray, Da Boy Dame, GloRilla and Kodak Black.

The album debuted at number 11 on the Billboard 200 and number 6 on the Top R&B/Hip-Hop Albums charts in the United States. Four songs off of the album, "Rocky Road", "See Wat I'm Sayin", "Steppers" and "Gangsta Art", made it to the Billboard charts.

Its sequel, "Gangsta Art 2", was release the following year.

== Track listing ==
No.	Title	Writer(s)	Producer(s)	Length
1.	"Gangsta Art" (performed by Yo Gotti, Moneybagg Yo, 42 Dugg, EST Gee, Mozzy, Lehla Samia and Blac Youngsta)	Mario Mims; Demario White; George Stone III; Timothy Patterson; Lehla Samia Harmon; Sammie Benson; Salomon Naar; Jack Richmeier; Bulat Radikovich Malikov; Aja Ayanna Cruz; Tia Dajee Rice	SoundsByBreezy; Jahk; Carter	4:58
2.	"Steppers" (performed by Yo Gotti, Moneybagg Yo, 42 Dugg, EST Gee, Mozzy and Blac Youngsta)	Mims; White; Dion Hayes; Stone III; Patterson; Benson; Samuel Gloade; Mateen Kyle Niknam; Eric Sloan; Liam McAllister; Indyah Mcalister	30 Roc; AyoPeeb; P.F. Sloan; LMC	3:51
3.	"Paparazzi" (performed by Yo Gotti, EST Gee and Blac Youngsta)	Mims; Stone III; Benson; Jeffrey Lynn Jones Jr.; David Morse	FOREVEROLLING; David Morse	2:40
4.	"Rocky Road" (performed by Moneybagg Yo and Kodak Black)	White; Bill K. Kapri; Robert Gullatt; Bennett Eun; Brayon Nelson; Thomas Walker	Drumgod; BennettMakingHits; Mook; Skywalker Og	2:59
5.	"G Code" (performed by Mozzy)	Patterson; David Grear; Julian Cannon	Dave-O; Julian Cannon	3:19
6.	"See Wat I'm Sayin" (performed by Moneybagg Yo)	White; Gullatt; Brytavious Lakeith Chambers	Drumgod; Tay Keith	2:27
7.	"1st of Jan" (performed by Yo Gotti, EST Gee and Mozzy)	Mims; Stone III; Patterson; Jones Jr.; Henning Grüschow	FOREVEROLLING; Audiovista	3:09
8.	"Pole" (performed by Yo Gotti and Lil Poppa)	Mims; Janarious Wheeler; Naar; Richmeier; Henri Velasco	SoundsByBreezy; Jahk; Hoops	2:01
9.	"Pledge" (performed by Lil Poppa)	Wheeler; Tony Dwayne Brown Jr.	Scotty OTH	2:46
10.	"Hood Rich" (performed by Lehla Samia and EST Gee)	Harmon; Stone III; Aubrey Robinson; Micaiah Malik Brown; David Bishop; Forte Bowie; Shonie Osumanu; Khouji Young	Boobie; Banger Slanger; Dos Dias	2:54
11.	"Tomorrow" (performed by GloRilla)	Gloria Woods; Antonio Anderson Jr.	Macaroni Toni	1:54
12.	"Buss Down" (performed by Yo Gotti and Big Boogie)	Mims; John Lotts; José Soto; Francis Michael Vulton; Aleksander Arsic	Soto; BeatzMikey; Xan	2:45
13.	"KeKe" (performed by Big Boogie)	Lotts; Jeremy Bradley; Eric Louis Grimes Jr.	JB Sauced Up; Eric Grimes, Jr.	3:02
14.	"OK" (performed by BlocBoy JB and Lil Migo)	James Baker; Adarious Smith; Cameron Castle; Michal Jech	DJ Junnie Baby; MStarOnTheBeat	2:24
15.	"Major Payne" (performed by 10Percent and Moneybagg Yo)	Pierce Mackey; White; Gabriel Melikardi Decastro; Joseph Nguyen	Gabriel Melikardi Decastro	2:17
16.	"Strong" (performed by EST Gee and Moneybagg Yo)	Stone III; White; Jones Jr.; Aaron Butler; Oscar Braojos Garcia	FOREVEROLLING; Flex On The Beat; Tymaz; Mikka	2:12
17.	"Brick or Sum" (performed by Tripstar and Yo Gotti)	Terrence Triplett; Mims; Chambers	Tay Keith	2:08
18.	"Dog House" (performed by Yo Gotti, 42 Dugg and DaBoyDame)	Mims; Hayes; Damien Aubrey; Martin McCurtis; Quincy Jones	Helluva	3:08
19.	"Hold Me Down" (performed by 42 Dugg and Coi Leray)	Hayes; Coi Leray; Tavian Carter	TAYTAYMADEIT	2:50
20.	"Top Dolla" (performed by Tripstar, Moneybagg Yo and EST Gee)	Triplett; White; Stone III; Marlon Lafayette Brown	ENRGY	2:07
21.	"Moral of da Story" (performed by Yo Gotti and Est Gee)	Mims; Stone III; McCurtis; Hayes	Helluva	2:22
22.	"Wait in Line" (performed by Yo Gotti and Blac Youngsta)	Mims; Benson; Christopher Pearson	YC	2:59
23.	"Really" (performed by Yo Gotti and Big30)	Mims; Rodney Wright; Kevin Davis Jr.; Rael Crawford Kelly	DJ KJ; Polo	3:20
24.	"Blac Ball" (performed by Blac Youngsta and Lil Migo)	Benson; Smith; Tahj Vaughn; Julien Anderson; Ethan Hayes	Tahj Money; Julien Anderson; Haze	2:59
25.	"Meant Dat" (performed by Big Boogie)	Lotts; Zwart Carter James; Garcia Mario Garca, Jr.; Donavant Mitchell Dean	Carter Z; Mario Garcia; Mitchell Dean	3:10
26.	"Soon" (performed by 42 Dugg and Arabian)	Hayes; Arabian McWilson; Gregory Sanders; Anderson	HitmanAudio; Julien Anderson	2:39
27.	"Big League" (performed by Yo Gotti, Moneybagg Yo, Mozzy and Lil Poppa)	Mims; White; Patterson; Wheeler; Shane Lindstrom; Tim Gomringer; Kevin Gomringer	Murda Beatz	2:43
Total length:				1:16:07

== Personnel ==
- Mario "Yo Gotti" Mims — performer (tracks: 1–3, 7, 8, 12, 17, 18, 21–23, 27)
- Demario "Moneybagg Yo" White — performer (tracks: 1, 2, 4, 6, 15, 16, 20, 27)
- Dion "42 Dugg" Hayes — performer (tracks: 1, 2, 18, 19, 26)
- George "EST Gee" Stone III — performer (tracks: 1–3, 7, 10, 16, 20, 21)
- Timothy "Mozzy" Patterson — performer (tracks: 1, 2, 5, 7, 27)
- Lehla Samia Harmon — performer (tracks: 1, 10)
- Sammie "Blac Youngsta" Benson — performer (tracks: 1–3, 22, 24)
- Dieuson "Kodak Black" Octave — performer (track 4)
- Janarious "Lil Poppa" Wheeler — performer (tracks: 8, 9, 27)
- Gloria "GloRilla" Woods — performer (track 11)
- John "Big Boogie" Lotts — performer (tracks: 12, 13, 25)
- James "BlocBoy JB" Baker — performer (track 14)
- Adarious "Lil Migo" Smith — performer (tracks: 14, 24)
- 10Percent — performer & recording (track 15)
- Terrence "Tripstar" Triplett — performer (tracks: 17, 20)
- Damien "DaBoyDame" Aubrey — performer (track 18)
- Coi Leray — performer (track 19)
- Rodney "Big30" Wright — performer (track 23)
- Arabian McWilson — performer (track 26)
- Salomon "SoundsByBreezy" Naar — producer (tracks: 1, 8)
- Jack "Jahk" Richmeier — producer (tracks: 1, 8)
- Bulat "Carter" Malikov — producer (track 1)
- Samuel "30 Roc" Gloade — producer (track 2)
- Mateen "AyoPeeb" Niknam — producer (track 2)
- Eric "P.F." Sloan — producer (track 2)
- Liam "LMC" McAllister — producer (track 2)
- Jeffrey Lynn "Foreverolling" Jones Jr. — producer (tracks: 3, 7, 16)
- David Morse — producer (track 3)
- Robert "Drumgod" Gullatt — producer (tracks: 4, 6)
- Bennett "BennettMakingHits" Eun — producer (track 4)
- Brayon "Mook" Nelson — producer (track 4)
- Thomas "Skywalker OG" Walker — producer (track 4), recording (tracks: 1, 2, 4, 15–17, 20, 27)
- David "Dave-O" Grear — producer (track 5)
- Julian Cannon — producer (track 5)
- Brytavious "Tay Keith" Chambers — producer (tracks: 6, 17)
- Henning "Audiovista" Grüschow — producer (track 7)
- Henri "Hoops" Velasco — producer (track 8)
- Tony Dwayne "Scotty Oth" Brown Jr. — producer (track 9)
- Aubrey "Boobie" Robinson — producer (track 10)
- Micaiah "Banger Slanger" Brown — producer (track 10)
- Dos Dias — producer (track 10)
- Antonio "Macaroni Toni" Anderson Jr. — producer (track 11)
- José Soto — producer (track 12)
- Francis Michael "BeatzMikey" Vulton — producer (track 12)
- Aleksander "Xan" Arsic — producer (track 12)
- Jeremy "JB Sauced Up" Bradley — producer (track 13)
- Eric Louis Grimes Jr. — producer (track 13)
- Cameron "DJ Junnie Baby" Castle — producer (track 14)
- Michal "MStarOnTheBeat" Jech — producer (track 14)
- Gabriel Melikardi Decastro — producer (track 15)
- Aaron "Flex on the Beat" Butler — producer (track 16)
- Tymaz — producer (track 16)
- Mikka — producer (track 16)
- Martin "Helluva" McCurtis — producer (tracks: 18, 21)
- Tavian "TayTayMadeIt" Carter — producer (track 19)
- Marlon "ENRGY" Brown — producer (track 20)
- Christopher "YC" Pearson — producer (track 22)
- Kevin "DJ KJLetTheBeatKnock" Davis Jr. — producer (track 23)
- Polo — producer (track 23)
- Tahj "Tahj Money" Vaughn — producer (track 24)
- Julien Anderson — producer (tracks: 24, 26)
- Ethan "Haze" Hayes — producer (track 24)
- Carter James "Carter Z" Zwart — producer (track 25)
- Mario Garca Garcia Jr. — producer (track 25)
- Mitchell Dean — producer (track 25)
- Gregory "HitmanAudio" Sanders — producer (track 26)
- Shane Lee "Murda Beatz" Lindstrom — producer (track 27)
- Liz Robson — recording (tracks: 1–3, 7, 8, 12, 17, 18, 21–23, 27)
- Khaya "Macxsn" Gilka — recording (tracks: 1, 2, 18, 19, 21, 26)
- JohnGotitt — recording (tracks: 1–3, 7, 16, 21)
- Piéce Eatah — recording (tracks: 1, 2, 5, 7, 27), mixing (track 5)
- Ezkiel "Rasta Papii" Henry — recording (tracks: 1, 3, 4, 22, 24)
- Earl Washington — recording (tracks: 8, 9)
- Anthony Smith — recording (track 10)
- AaRON — recording & mixing (track 11)
- Leon Bates — recording (tracks: 13, 25)
- Jaylon Charles — recording (track 27)
- Ari Morris — mixing (tracks: 1, 2, 4, 6, 12, 13, 15–17, 20–25)
- Fabian Marasciullo — mixing (tracks: 3, 7, 18, 27)
- Kev Spencer — mixing (tracks: 8, 19)
- Rich Keller — mixing (track 9)
- Herb Powers — mixing (track 10)
- BiggDfasho — mixing (track 10)
- Steven Kubie — mixing (track 10)
- Clay Perry III — mixing (track 14)
- Logan Schmitz — mixing (track 23), mixing assistant (tracks: 1, 2, 4, 6, 13, 15–17, 20–22, 24, 25)
- Colin Leonard — mastering
- Leo Goff — executive producer

== Charts ==
Chart (2022)	Peak position
US Billboard 200	11
US Top R&B/Hip-Hop Albums (Billboard)	6
