= Tomorrow (GloRilla song) =

2022 single by GloRilla

Single by GloRilla

from the album Gangsta Art
- Released: July 15, 2022
- Genre: Crunk
- Length: 1:43
- Label: CMG
- Songwriters: Gloria Woods; Antonio Anderson Jr.
- Producer: Macaroni Toni

GloRilla singles chronology
| "Sneaky Link" (2022) | "Tomorrow" (2022) | "Just Say That (Remix)" (2022) |

Music video
- "Tomorrow" on YouTube

"Tomorrow" is a song by American rapper GloRilla. It was released on July 15, 2022, as a single from Collective Music Group's compilation album Gangsta Art (2022). It was co-written and produced by Antonio "Macaroni Toni" Anderson Jr., who died in November 2024. On September 23, 2022, the official remix of the song, titled "Tomorrow 2", with American rapper Cardi B was released. The remix brought the song to its peak at number 9 on the US Billboard Hot 100.

== Composition ==
The song features piano chords and bass in the production. GloRilla raps in an aggressive manner, while lyrically she dismisses her detractors and raps about her good qualities, keeping her circle close but being "kinda ratchet still", as well as her status and standards with an optimistic tone.

== Music video ==
A music video for "Tomorrow" was released alongside the single on July 15, 2022. It shows GloRilla and her friends partying and twerking at an airport tarmac, inside a private jet, and on a Bentley. They hold stacks of cash throughout the video as well.

== Live performances ==
GloRilla performed a snippet of "Tomorrow" during a medley with "F.N.F. (Let's GO)" at the 2022 BET Hip Hop Awards.

== Tomorrow 2 ==
"Tomorrow 2" is the official remix of "Tomorrow" by GloRilla with American rapper Cardi B. It was released as the third single from Glorilla's debut extended play (EP) Anyways, Life's Great on September 23, 2022. "Tomorrow 2" peaked at number 9 on the Billboard Hot 100, marking GloRilla's first top-ten hit and Cardi B's eleventh, and was certified 4× Platinum in the United States.
