= Blessed (GloRilla song) =

2022 single by GloRilla

Single by GloRilla

from the EP Anyways, Life's Great
- Released: August 31, 2022
- Length: 3:36
- Label: CMG; Interscope
- Songwriters: Gloria Woods; Mario Mims; Antonio Anderson, Jr.
- Producer: Macaroni Toni

GloRilla singles chronology
"Just Say That (Remix)" (2022)	"Blessed" (2022)	"F.N.F. (Let's Go) (Remix)" (2022)

Yo Gotti singles chronology
"Big League" (2022)	"Blessed" (2022)	"Brown Liquor" (2022)

Music video
- "Blessed" on YouTube

"Blessed" is a song by American rapper GloRilla, released on August 31, 2022, as the second single from her debut EP Anyways, Life's Great (2022). The song features uncredited vocals from American rapper Yo Gotti and was co-written and produced by Macaroni Toni, who died in November 2024.

== Composition ==
Built on a "sparse but hard-hitting beat", the song sees GloRilla rapping about her newfound success and her appreciation for it. In her verse, she asserts she would "rather give the people hope" because "it's pointless to be giving fucks", has moved to the suburbs though maintaining her "ratchet tendencies", and focuses on taking care of people. Yo Gotti details his own successes in the second verse.

== Critical reception ==
Tom Breihan of Stereogum gave a positive review, writing, "She's great at tough, direct Memphis rap, and her deep, rich voice sounds amazing. Yo Gotti has been in the game for decades, but when he shows up on 'Blessed,' he and Glorilla sound like peers."

== Music video ==
Directed by Louie Knows, the music video sees GloRilla hosting a tea party for old ladies, which soon turns into a "more up-beat" party.

== Charts ==
Weekly chart performance for "Blessed"
Chart (2022)	Peak position
US Bubbling Under Hot 100 (Billboard)	8
US Hot R&B/Hip-Hop Songs (Billboard)	37

== Certifications ==
Certifications for "Blessed"
Region	Certification	Certified units/sales
United States (RIAA)	Gold	500,000^{‡}
^{‡} Sales+streaming figures based on certification alone.
