= I Luv Her =

2024 song by GloRilla featuring T-Pain

Song by GloRilla featuring T-Pain

from the album Glorious
- Released: October 11, 2024
- Genre: Hip-hop
- Length: 2:56
- Label: Collective; Interscope
- Songwriters: Gloria Woods; Faheem Najm; Korey Roberson; Laurie Conde; Montay Humphrey
- Producer: DJ Montay

Music video
- "I Luv Her" on YouTube

"I Luv Her" is a song by American rapper GloRilla featuring American singer T-Pain, released on October 11, 2024, from the former's debut studio album, Glorious. It was produced by DJ Montay.

== Content ==
In the song, GloRilla revolves around her willingness to enter a sexual relationship, even if it can be hard at times. She hopes that she did not fall in love too quickly, which she expresses in the second verse, but is overall optimistic about the direction of their relationship.

== Critical reception ==
The song received generally favorable reviews. Robin Murray of Clash stated that it "sounds curiously dated", while Mosi Reeves of Rolling Stone remarked it "simply doesn't sound right when T-Pain doesn't croon grandiloquently in his inimitable Auto-Tune for over five minutes, even as Glo drops funny lines like claiming she's her man's 'favorite redbone' and rapping, 'I know I be naggin' sometimes/Shit, put dick in my mouth, make me shut up or something." Vivian Medithi of Pitchfork wrote "T-Pain swings through on 'I Luv Her,' though the contrast between their vocal styles can't elevate Glo's pick-me relationship bars". Billboard's Michael Saponara ranked "I Luv Her" as the second best song from Glorious, while Revolt's Sharmaine Johnson considered it the album's best song.

== Music video ==
An official music video was directed by Benny Boom and released on November 14, 2024. It opens with a pregnant GloRilla going into labor, as her love interest (played by actor Da'Vinchi) calls a ride to the hospital. The clip then flashbacks to the history of their relationship, starting with their first meeting in the parking lot of an Atlanta strip mall, where they exchange numbers after GloRilla picks up Chinese takeout from the restaurant Wingnuts & Chopsticks. They begin having dinner dates, before marrying and starting a family. At the end of the video, their relationship is revealed to be only an imagination.

== Charts ==
=== Weekly charts ===
Weekly chart performance for "I Luv Her"
Chart (2024)	Peak position
New Zealand Hot Singles (RMNZ)	9
US Billboard Hot 100	70
US Hot R&B/Hip-Hop Songs (Billboard)	18

=== Year-end charts ===
Year-end chart performance for "I Luv Her"
Chart (2025)	Position
US Hot R&B/Hip-Hop Songs (Billboard)	48

== Certifications ==
Region	Certification	Certified units/sales
New Zealand (RMNZ)	Gold	15,000^{‡}
United States (RIAA)	Platinum	1,000,000^{‡}
^{‡} Sales+streaming figures based on certification alone.
