= Finesse (disambiguation) =

Finesse is a technique in the card game of contract bridge.

Finesse may also refer to:

== Music ==
- Finesse (Glenn Jones album) or the title song, 1984
- Finesse (Toshiko Akiyoshi album), 1978
- "Finesse" (BossMan Dlow song), 2023
- "Finesse" (Bruno Mars song), 2016
- "Finesse" (Pheelz song), 2022
- "Finesse", a song by Drake from Scorpion, 2018
- "Finesse", a song by Stefflon Don from Secure, 2018

== Science and technology ==
- Fast Infrared Exoplanet Spectroscopy Survey Explorer, a proposed NASA mission
- Finesse OS, an operating system for Cisco PIX firewall
- Finesse, a term in optics for an attribute characterizing the selectivity or Q factor of an optical cavity, such as a Fabry–Perot interferometer

== Sports ==
- Finesse Juvenile Hurdle, a British horse race
- Finesse Motorsport, a British motor racing team
- Finesse pitcher, or control pitcher, in baseball

== People ==
- Finesse Mitchell (born 1972), American comedian
- Lord Finesse (born 1970), American rapper and hip-hop record producer

== Other uses ==
- Finesse (character), a Marvel Comics character
- Finesse, a shampoo brand owned by Unilever
