= Ehhthang Ehhthang =

Mixtape by GloRilla
- Released: April 5, 2024
- Genre: Hip-hop
- Length: 32:51
- Labels: CMG; Interscope

GloRilla chronology
Anyways, Life's Great (2022)	Ehhthang Ehhthang (2024)	Glorious (2024)

Singles from Ehhthang Ehhthang
- 1. "Yeah Glo!" Released: February 9, 2024; 2. "Wanna Be" Released: April 5, 2024

Ehhthang Ehhthang is the second mixtape by American rapper GloRilla. It was released through Collective Music Group and Interscope Records on April 5, 2024. It marked her first mixtape to be released commercially under a label and followed her previous extended play (EP), Anyways, Life's Great (2022).

Upon release, Ehhthang Ehhthang debuted at number 18 on the US Billboard 200. It was supported by the singles "Yeah Glo!" and "Wanna Be" (with Megan Thee Stallion), both of which entered the top 40 of the US Billboard Hot 100.

== Background ==
On March 21, 2024, GloRilla announced the release of her mixtape, titled Ehhthang Ehhthang on April 5. She shared the official artwork, which depicts the rapper sporting just underwear and a red jacket, alongside a pre-save link, revealing that the project would include her previously released single, "Yeah Glo!". She additionally shared snippets of two tracks that were described as "pure Memphis grit".

It marked her first solo project since her extended play (EP), Anyways, Life's Great (2022) and her first full-length solo since 2019’s Most Likely Up Next. On April 2, she shared the mixtape's tracklist of 12 tracks, including collaborations with Megan Thee Stallion, Moneybagg Yo, Real Boston Richey, Kevo Muney, and Finesse2Tymes. In celebration of the project's release, GloRilla held signing events at Rough Trade and Looney Tunes record shops in New York City. She embarked on the Hot Girl Summer Tour as its opener with Megan Thee Stallion in May 2024, who appears on the mixtape's second single, "Wanna Be".

== Music and lyrics ==
The mixtape predominantly consists of "hard trap beats and boastful rhymes", with some nods to the 2000s crunk scene. The exceptions to this are the "metal guitar riffs" of "Bad Bih 4 Ya" and the "autotune-laced R&B" sound of "Aite". In the latter song, GloRilla imagines unity between female rappers in the line, "I just pray one day the bad bitches'll come together/ 'Cause Cardi and Nicki on a track would break some fuckin' records," referring to feuding rappers Cardi B and Nicki Minaj. In the album's opener "Yeah Glo!", she flexes her superiority over haters and her luxurious lifestyle, while in "Opp Shit", she raps about navigating love in hostile territory. Tracks such as "All Dere" were described as paying homage to the golden era of hip-hop from the late 90s and early 2000s while nodding to the present by infusing modern trap beats and lyrical references to Instagram, crypto investments, and Uber rides.

== Critical reception ==
Professional ratings
Review scores
Source	Rating
AllMusic	3/5 stars

Demi Philipps of HotNewHipHop wrote that Ehhthang Ehhthang is a "mega-sized stepping stone" for GloRilla and a "nod to authenticity and a reminder that staying true to oneself is an art form." She described the rapper as "sharp, unapologetic, and dripping with Southern charm" and praised her assertiveness and infectious energy on the mixtape. However, she found that some of beats lacked cohesion and were caught between trying to do both classic hip-hop and more modern trap-based sounds.

== Awards and nominations ==
Award	Year	Category	Result	Ref.
BET Hip Hop Awards	2024	Hip Hop Album of the Year	Nominated	

== Track listing ==
No.	Title	Length
1.	"Yeah Glo!"	2:22
2.	"All Dere" (featuring Moneybagg Yo)	2:56
3.	"Nun of Dem"	2:30
4.	"No Bih"	2:59
5.	"Wanna Be" (with Megan Thee Stallion)	2:36
6.	"Opp Shit"	2:06
7.	"Aite" (featuring Kevo Muney)	4:01
8.	"Bad Bih 4 Ya" (featuring Real Boston Richey)	3:00
9.	"Finesse da Glo" (featuring Finesse2tymes)	2:22
10.	"High AF"	2:31
11.	"GMFU - Pt. 2"	2:20
12.	"In Dat Mode"	3:02
Total length:		32:51

== Charts ==
=== Weekly charts ===
Weekly chart performance for Ehhthang Ehhthang
Chart (2024)	Peak position
US Billboard 200	18
US Top R&B/Hip-Hop Albums (Billboard)	4

=== Year-end charts ===
Year-end chart performance for Ehhthang Ehhthang
Chart (2024)	Position
US Billboard 200	145
US Top R&B/Hip-Hop Albums (Billboard)	43

== Certifications ==
Certifications for Ehhthang Ehhthang
Region	Certification	Certified units/sales
United States (RIAA)	Gold	500,000^{‡}
^{‡} Sales+streaming figures based on certification alone.
