= Jorjiana =

American rapper

- Born: Jorja Faith-Wilson; December 31, 2004 (age 21); Michigan City, Indiana, U.S.
- Genre: Midwestern hip hop
- Occupations: Rapper, songwriter
- Years active: 2024–present
- Labels: Atlantic; BuVision
- Website: jorjiana219.com

Jorja Faith-Wilson (born December 31, 2004), known professionally as Jorjiana, is an American rapper from Michigan City, Indiana. She is best known for her 2024 single "ILBB2" (remixed featuring Glorilla).

== Career ==
Jorjiana began releasing music and building an audience on short-form and streaming platforms. Her breakout came with "ILBB2" (2024), which drew notice for its off-kilter flow over a Detroit-influenced beat. A widely covered 2025 remix featuring GloRilla further increased the song's visibility.

In early 2025, Jorjiana signed to Atlantic Music Group. She also released "Time," a single noted by HotNewHipHop for blending a jazz-tinted instrumental with introspective themes, highlighting a stylistic shift from her harder tracks such as "Wok Sauce."

She has also issued "Shark" (including a remix) and appeared in performance/interview content (e.g., On The Radar), which contributed to her online traction.

Billboard listed her as one of the top 15 in Hip-hop and R&B to watch in 2025.

== Artistry ==
Coverage has described Jorjiana's cadence as "conversational, nonchalant," frequently placed slightly off the beat, often over glitchy, Detroit-style production; later singles explore jazz-lounge textures.

== Discography ==
=== Mixtapes ===
List of mixtapes, with selected details
Title	Mixtape details
Project 219	Released: November 14, 2025; Label: Atlantic Records; Format: Digital download, streaming

=== Extended plays ===
List of EPs, with selected details
Title	EP details
5 Elements	Released: August 21, 2026; Label: Atlantic Records • BuVision; Format: Digital download, streaming

Singles

- "ILBB2" (2024); "ILBB2 (feat. GloRilla)" (2025); "ILBB2 (We Love BB2) [feat. BabyChiefDoit]" (2025)
- "Time" (2025)
- "Wok Sauce" (2025)
- "Shark (feat. Rio Da Yung OG)" (2025); "Shark (Remix) [feat. Babyfxce E & Chuckyy]" (2025)
- "Himothy Johnson" (2025)
- "Can't Be Concrete" (2025)
- "ILY XL (feat. Lil Yachty)" (2025)
- "Rich Finally" (2026)
- "Hoe Phase (feat. Youngboy Never Broke Again)" (2026)
- "WOKE UP" (2026)
- "808-Wish" (2026)
