= Glorious (GloRilla album) =

- Standard cover

Studio album by GloRilla
- Released: October 11, 2024
- Length: 42:00
- Label: CMG; Interscope
- Producer: 1wireshak; Ace Charisma; B100; Byeperfect; Cartier Fly; Coupe; CRVS Serranio; DJ Montay; Drumdummie; FnZ; Fraxille; Finnessemadethebeat; Ghostrage; Go Grizzly; Hawky; Halfway; Hennessey Beatz; Higainerz; Humphrey; Jazze Pha; Kee Londn; Kingbnjmn; Lil' Ronnie; London Jae; Major Seven; Max Hummel; Muzik Major; Muzikman; Nevrmind; Pooh Beatz; Sakii; Satori; SkipOnDaBeat; Squat; Steven Shaeffer; Supah Mario; Timbaland; Zenjikozen

GloRilla chronology
Ehhthang Ehhthang (2024)	Glorious (2024)

Alternative cover
- Vinyl cover

Singles from Glorious
- 1. "TGIF" Released: June 21, 2024; 2. "Hollon" Released: September 20, 2024; 3. "Whatchu Kno About Me" Released: October 22, 2024

Glorious (stylised in all caps) is the debut studio album by American rapper GloRilla. It was released on October 11, 2024, through Collective Music Group (CMG) and Interscope Records. The record is preceded by two singles: "TGIF" (which peaked at number 28 on the Billboard Hot 100) and "Hollon". A follow-up to her second mixtape Ehhthang Ehhthang, released in April 2024, Glorious features guest appearances from Latto, Sexyy Red, Muni Long, Kirk Franklin, Chandler Moore, Kierra Sheard, Maverick City Music, Megan Thee Stallion, BossMan Dlow, T-Pain, and Fridayy. Production was executively handled by her CMG label boss Yo Gotti, alongside Ace Charisma, Go Grizzly, London Jae, Timbaland, and SkipOnDaBeat, among others.

Glorious was nominated for Outstanding Album at the 56th NAACP Image Awards, Album of the Year at the 25th BET Awards and Best Rap Album at 68th Annual Grammy Awards.

== Promotion ==
=== Tour ===
On January 31, 2025, GloRilla officially announced the tour dates for the Glorious Tour, with Real Boston Richey and Queen Key; at that time, the Memphis date was still being determined. On April 30, 2025, GloRilla announced the Memphis date, set to be held at the FedExForum on July 25, 2025, dubbed as "GloRilla & Friends: 1st Annual Glo-Bash".

== Critical reception ==
Professional ratings
Aggregate scores
Source	Rating
Metacritic	72/100
Review scores
Source	Rating
Clash	7/10
NME	3/5 stars
Pitchfork	7.2/10
Rolling Stone	3/5 stars

At Metacritic, which assigns a normalized rating out of 100 to reviews from mainstream critics, the album received an average score of 72, which indicates "generally favorable reviews", based on 5 reviews. Vivian Medithi of Pitchfork rated the album 7.2/10 and wrote in a review, "The 25-year-old rapper has grown as a lyricist, but what’s most exciting about GLORIOUS is its idiosyncrasy. Expanding beyond playlistable trap prerequisites and the wistful soul chops that signal A Serious Rap Album, GloRilla channels the music of her youth, cycling through crunk and gospel with aplomb."

Critics' year-end rankings of Glorious
Publication	List	Rank	Ref.
NPR	The 50 Best Albums of 2024	—N/a	

== Commercial performance ==
Glorious debuted at number five on the Billboard 200, achieving 69,000 album-equivalent units sold, including 13,000 in pure sales. It was the highest first week sales for a female rap album in 2024. Additionally, the album accumulated an 77.9 million streams within its first week.

== Track listing ==
Glorious track listing
No.	Title	Writer(s)	Producer(s)	Length
1.	"Intro"	Gloria Woods; Egor Chipin; Darryl Clemons; Jaucquez Lowe; Julius Riveria III; Kevin Price; Morris Jones; Quinton L. Cook; Timothy Mckibbins; Vadim Rogozhin	Go Grizzly; B100; Muzik Major; London Jae; Byeperfect; 1wireshak	1:28
2.	"Hollon"	Woods; Edgar Ferrera; Michael Mulé; Isaac De Boni; Montay Humphrey; Aaron Bolton; Anthony Platt; Donald Jenkins; Maurice Gleaton; Korey Roberson; Howard Simmons	SkipOnDaBeat; FnZ	2:08
3.	"Procedure" (with Latto)	Woods; Alyssa Stephens; Jonathan Priester	Supah Mario	2:54
4.	"TGIF"	Woods; Yakki Davis; Lucas Alegria; Mario Mims; Jorge M. Taveras; Jess Jackson; Ronnie Jackson; Dillon Brophy	Zenjikozen; Jess Jackson^{[a]}; Brophy^{[a]}	2:44
5.	"Whatchu Kno About Me" (with Sexyy Red)	Woods; Janae Wherry; Davis; Amari Freeman; Javaan Anderson; Jeremy Allen; Jonathan Reed; R. Jackson; Torrence Hatch; Webster Gardney Jr	Ace Charisma; Lil' Ronnie	2:29
6.	"Stop Playing"	Woods; Jorden Thorpe; Cristian Colon; Ferrera; Jimmi Nguyen; Jordan Nguyen; Mims; Timothy Mosley	Timbaland; SkipOnDaBeat; CRVS Serranio; Sakii; Satori	3:36
7.	"Don't Deserve" (with Muni Long)	Woods; Priscilla Hamilton; Artem Raschepkin; Dudley Duverne; Fokin Maxim; Jonas Gumdal; Rafael Ishman; R. Jackson; Tevin Revell; William Boyette	Hawky; Drumdummie; Fraxille; Max Hummel	3:52
8.	"Rain Down on Me" (with Kirk Franklin, Chandler Moore, Kierra Sheard, and Maverick City Music)	Woods; Kierra Sheard; Kirk Smith; Benjamin Singh-Reynolds; Damien Aubrey; Duverne; J. Drew Sheard II; Joakim Toftgaard; Marcaelis Sanders; Marlon Hampton; Omar Walker; Rex Zamor; Samuel Williams	Nevrmind; Major Seven; Muzikman; Kingbnjmn	3:48
9.	"Glo's Prayer"	Woods; Aidan Crotinger; Artyom Tsalko; Stever Shaeffer	Shaeffer; Hennessey Beatz; Halfway	3:07
10.	"How I Look" (with Megan Thee Stallion)	Woods; Megan Pete; Lowe; Riveria; Price; Jones; Mckibbins	Go Grizzly; B100; London Jae	1:58
11.	"I Ain't Going"	Woods; Freeman; Charles Ingram	Ace Charisma; Ghostrage	2:51
12.	"Step" (with BossMan Dlow)	Woods; Devante McCreary; Kirill Komyshey	Kee Londn	2:43
13.	"Let Her Cook"	Woods; Davis; Clemons; Edward Cooper III; Isaac Hayes; Lowe; Riveria	London Jae; Pooh Beatz; Squat; Coupe	2:35
14.	"I Luv Her" (with T-Pain)	Woods; Faheem Najm; Korey Roberson; Laurie Conde; Humphrey	DJ Montay	2:56
15.	"Queen of Memphis" (with Fridayy)	Woods; Francis Leblanc; Ardarious Ester; Jabre Jones; Kavi Lybarger; Lewis Young; Mortiz Schenider; Phalon Alexander	Cartier Fly; Jazze Pha; Higainerz; FinesseMadeTheBeat	2:46
Total length:				42:00

Bonus track edition
No.	Title	Writer(s)	Producer(s)	Length
16.	"Never Find" (with K Carbon)	Freeman; Duverne; Anderson; R. Jackson; Rickey Offord; Julius Darrington	Lil Ronnie; SlikkMuzik; Ace Charisma	2:49
Total length:				2:49

=== Notes ===
- ^{^[a]} signifies an additional producer.

== Charts ==
=== Weekly charts ===
Weekly chart performance for Glorious
Chart (2024)	Peak position
US Billboard 200	5
US Top R&B/Hip-Hop Albums (Billboard)	2

=== Year-end charts ===
Year-end chart performance for Glorious
Chart (2025)	Position
US Billboard 200	57
US Top R&B/Hip-Hop Albums (Billboard)	16

== Certifications ==
Certifications for Glorious
Region	Certification	Certified units/sales
New Zealand (RMNZ)	Gold	7,500^{‡}
United States (RIAA)	Platinum	1,000,000^{‡}
^{‡} Sales+streaming figures based on certification alone.
