= Glorious Tour =

2025 concert tour by GloRilla

The Glorious Tour
- Tour by GloRilla
- Promotional poster for the tour
- Associated album: Glorious
- Start date: March 5, 2025
- End date: July 25, 2025
- Legs: 1
- No. of shows: 22
- Supporting acts: Real Boston Richey, Queen Key

The Glorious Tour was the debut headlining concert tour by American rapper GloRilla. It was announced on January 31, 2025, in support of her debut-studio album Glorious (2024). The tour kicked off on March 5, 2025, in Oklahoma City, Oklahoma and concluded on July 25, 2025, in Memphis, Tennessee.

== Background ==
On January 31, 2025, GloRilla announced the tour dates for the Glorious tour, with Real Boston Richey and Queen Key; the Memphis date still being determined.

On April 30, 2025, GloRilla announced the Memphis date, set to be held at the FedExForum on July 25, 2025, named as GloRilla & Friends: 1st Annual Glo-Bash.

== Critical reception ==
The tour was critically successful. In particular, the choreography, costumes, and staging during performances were praised by local media. Rap-Up noted that at Fort Lauderdale, GloRilla delivered "Big energy, Big Glo", earning a perfect "10 out of 10" from peer Rubi Rose.

== Tour dates ==
List of 2025 concerts
Date	City	Country	Venue	Opening Act	Attendees	Revenue
March 5	Oklahoma City	United States	The Criterion	Real Boston Richey; Queen Key	—	—
March 6	Dallas	United States	South Side Ballroom	Real Boston Richey; Queen Key	—	—
March 7	Houston	United States	713 Music Hall	Real Boston Richey; Queen Key	—	—
March 9	Jacksonville	United States	VyStar Veterans Memorial Auditorium	Real Boston Richey; Queen Key	—	—
March 10	Fort Lauderdale	United States	War Memorial	Real Boston Richey; Queen Key	—	—
March 12	Atlanta	United States	Coca-Cola Roxy	Real Boston Richey; Queen Key	—	—
March 13	Charlotte	United States	Bojangles Coliseum	Real Boston Richey; Queen Key	—	—
March 14	Washington, D.C.	United States	The Anthem	Real Boston Richey; Queen Key	—	—
March 19	New York City	United States	Hammerstein Ballroom	Real Boston Richey; Queen Key	—	—
March 20	Boston	United States	MGM Music Hall	Real Boston Richey; Queen Key	—	—
March 22	Cincinnati	United States	The Andrew J. Brady Music Center	Real Boston Richey; Queen Key	—	—
March 23	Chicago	United States	The Salt Shed	Real Boston Richey; Queen Key	—	—
March 24	St. Louis	United States	The Factory	Real Boston Richey; Queen Key	—	—
March 26	Milwaukee	United States	Eagles Ballroom	Real Boston Richey; Queen Key	—	—
March 27	Minneapolis	United States	Armory	Real Boston Richey; Queen Key	—	—
April 6 (Note: The concert on April 6 was a part of the Dreamville Festival.)	Raleigh	United States	Dorothea Dix Park	Real Boston Richey; Queen Key	—	—
April 11 (Note: The concerts on April 11 & 18 were a part of Coachella.)	Indio	United States	Empire Polo Club	Real Boston Richey; Queen Key	—	—
April 12	Las Vegas	United States	The Theater at Virgin Hotels Las Vegas	Real Boston Richey; Queen Key	—	—
April 13	Stateline	United States	Tahoe Blue Event Center	Real Boston Richey; Queen Key	—	—
April 16	Oakland	United States	Fox Theater	Real Boston Richey; Queen Key	—	—
April 18	Indio	United States	Empire Polo Club	Real Boston Richey; Queen Key	—	—
July 25 (Note: The concert on July 25 was named as the GloRilla & Friends: 1st Annual Glo-Bash)	Memphis	United States	FedExForum	—	—	—
