= Hollon =

2024 single by GloRilla

Single by GloRilla

from the album Glorious
- Released: September 20, 2024
- Genre: Southern hip hop
- Length: 2:08
- Label: CMG; Interscope
- Songwriters: Gloria Woods; Edgar Ferrera; Michael Mulé; Isaac De Boni; Montay Humphrey; Aaron Bolton; Anthony Platt; Donald Jenkins; Maurice Gleaton; Korey Roberson; Howard Simmons
- Producers: SkipOnDaBeat; FnZ

GloRilla singles chronology
"Show Dat Work" (2024)	"Hollon" (2024)	"Whatchu Kno About Me" (2024)

Music video
- "Hollon" on YouTube

"Hollon" (stylised in all caps) is a song by American rapper GloRilla, released on September 20, 2024, as the second single from her debut studio album, Glorious. Produced by SkipOnDaBeat and FnZ, it samples "Hold on Ho" by Unk.

== Composition and lyrics ==
The song is built on a sample of "Hold on Ho", using hi-hats and a horn sample as well. GloRilla boasts to her enemies, declaring how she and her women friends handle problems in the opening: "You must not know what you just started / Me and my bitches go gnarly / Give a fuck about this party / We gon' step on shit regardless".

== Critical reception ==
Tom Breihan of Stereogum called the song "another in her long series of hard-stomping chant-alongs". Elias Andrews of HotNewHipHop stated, "GloRilla is talking trash and flexing on her haters. What else would you want her to do? She does it well, and it sounds ridiculously catchy as she does it." Aaron Williams of Uproxx wrote regarding the song, "One thing GloRilla is good at: giving fans rambunctious singalong anthems with crowd-pleasing chants set to soul-shaking beats."

== Charts ==
Chart performance for "Hollon"
Chart (2024)	Peak position
US Billboard Hot 100	48
US Hot R&B/Hip-Hop Songs (Billboard)	12

== Certifications ==
Certifications for "Hollon"
Region	Certification	Certified units/sales
United States (RIAA)	Gold	500,000^{‡}
^{‡} Sales+streaming figures based on certification alone.
