= Lil Poppa =

American rapper (2000–2026)

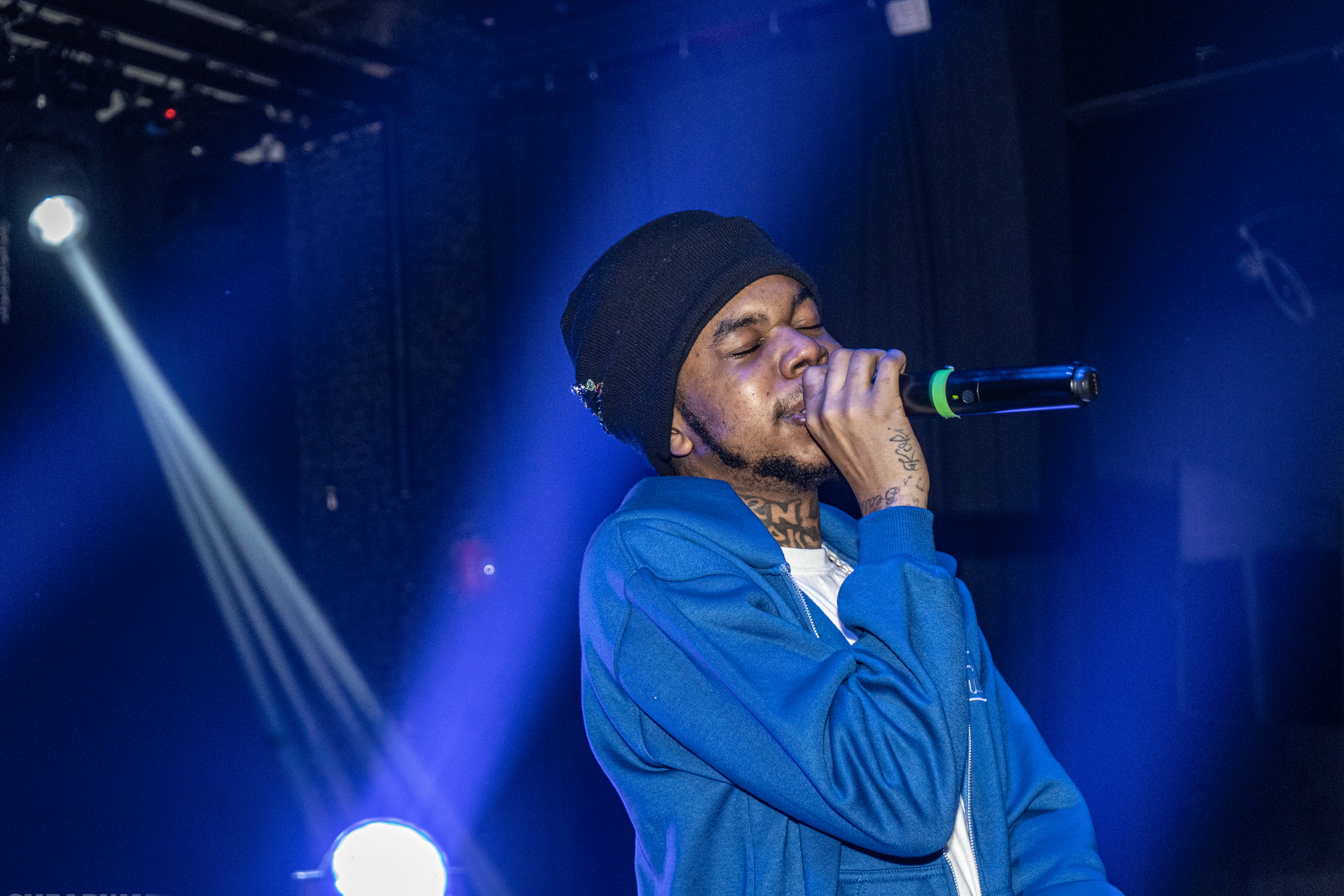
- Lil Poppa at The Regency Live in Springfield, Missouri, 2025

Background information
- Also known as: That Boy Poppa
- Born: Janarious Mykel Wheeler; March 18, 2000; Jacksonville, Florida, U.S.
- Died: February 18, 2026 (aged 25) Fulton County, Georgia, U.S.
- Cause of death: Suicide by gunshot
- Genre: Southern hip-hop
- Occupations: Rapper; singer; songwriter
- Years active: 2014–2026
- Labels: Collective; Rule #1; Interscope
- Website: lilpoppa.com

Janarious Mykel Wheeler (March 18, 2000 – February 18, 2026), better known by his stage name Lil Poppa, was an American rapper, singer, and songwriter. He rose to prominence with his 2018 single "Purple Hearts" as well as "Eternal Living" (2019) and "Love & War" (2021) — "Eternal Living" has received gold certification by the Recording Industry Association of America (RIAA).

A native of Jacksonville, Florida, Lil Poppa signed with Interscope Records in 2019. His debut album, Blessed, I Guess (2021), entered the Billboard 200 and received positive critical reception. He then signed with Yo Gotti's Collective Music Group (CMG) record label in 2022 to release several more projects. He performed on "Big League", the theme song of the 2022 NBA Finals, with fellow CMG signees.

According to SiriusXM, Lil Poppa's music "balanc[ed] tales of violence and retribution with loyalty to his loved ones, regret for his missteps, and the desperation to create a better life for himself." It was later described in HotNewHipHop as an "undeniably riveting sound that relie[d] on the brute honesty that he mask[ed] through his melodic delivery." In 2025, the same publication described Lil Poppa as "one of rap’s most introspective storytellers."

== Early life ==
Wheeler was born in Jacksonville, Florida, on March 18, 2000. He grew up alternating between his mother's house on the Eastside of Jacksonville and his grandma and aunt’s house on the Westside. Wheeler was occasionally bedridden as a result of a chronic blood disease. He was nicknamed "Poppa" by his mother and added "Lil" since he often hung around older kids.

Wheeler started writing music for his church at the age of seven, being inspired by his oldest brother Chi Chi. By age 10, he was performing his raps in church. Wheeler then built a makeshift studio in his closet when he was 12 and started recording music with a laptop and Radio Shack microphone, with his musical influences including rappers Bow Wow, Chief Keef, and Kodak Black.

Growing up in Jacksonville, Wheeler survived a shooting in which two of his best friends were killed.

== Career ==
=== 2014–2018: Beginnings ===
In his youth, Lil Poppa was a member of Cutt Circle, a popular local rap group in Jacksonville composed of older artists. He was featured on their most popular song, "Lions, Tigers, and Bears", released in 2014. Lil Poppa began uploading his own music to websites like SoundCloud and MyMixtapez. He caught the attention of Bigga Rankin, a prominent local DJ who began to sponsor his mixtapes and help him promote his music, significantly boosting his profile. Initially using the stage name That Boy Poppa, his early mixtape releases included Est. 2000 (2016) and Life After Desi (2017). He followed up with a seven-track extended play (EP) called "Evergreen Wildchild" (2018).

Later that year, Lil Poppa released a mixtape titled Under Investigation, which, according Complex, "sent his stock through the roof." The mixtape spawned two successful singles: "Nightmare on Elm St" and "Purple Hearts". In the latter, Lil Poppa recounts the emotions he felt surviving the 2018 shooting; XXL described it as a "somber audio diary" and "a showcase of [his] melody-driven delivery and storytelling chops". Aside from becoming popular locally, the song and its accompanying music video caught the attention of major record labels.

=== 2019–2021: Signing with Interscope, Blessed, I Guess ===
Lil Poppa signed with Interscope Records in 2019. That same year, he released his major label debut mixtape, Under Investigation 2, which included his hit single "Eternal Living" (featuring Polo G), as well as additional guest appearances from Mozzy and NoCap. Lil Poppa followed this up with another mixtape, Almost Normal. In May 2020, he released another mixtape, Evergreen Wildchild 2, which featured Stunna 4 Vegas.

Lil Poppa released his debut studio album, Blessed, I Guess, in May 2021. It received a 7.3 rating in Pitchfork and was called a "conflicted, compelling release" by David Crone of AllMusic, who also praised his "potent songwriting". According to Audiomack, it "prize[d] subtlety over sweeping statements and zoom[ed] in on [his] carefully considered, sometimes conflicted thoughts". The album peaked at No. 160 on the Billboard 200. One of the songs on the album, "Love & War", later received gold certification by the Recording Industry Association of America (RIAA) in 2026.

=== 2022–2026: Signing with CMG and subsequent releases ===
In April 2022, Lil Poppa signed with Yo Gotti's record label, Collective Music Group (CMG), an imprint of Interscope. The two commemorated the deal by releasing a collaborative single, "H Spot", along with a corresponding music video. A week later, Lil Poppa released the 21-track mixtape Under Investigation 3, which featured guest appearances from Yo Gotti and Lil Duval. The mixtape, which peaked at No. 194 on the Billboard 200 in May, was described as "another showcase for [his] fluid, fast-paced melodic flow and violent, tormented lyrics" in a staff review by AllMusic. Shortly thereafter, Lil Poppa was featured on the single "Big League", which served as the official theme song of the 2022 NBA Finals, alongside Yo Gotti and fellow CMG artists Mozzy and Moneybagg Yo. He also co-headlined the Wicked Wildchild United Summer Bash at the Florida Theatre with fellow Jacksonville rapper Nardo Wick.

Lil Poppa released another album, titled Heavy is the Head, in November 2022, which peaked at No. 4 on the Billboard Heatseekers Albums chart. Alphonse Pierre of Pitchfork wrote that it was "driven by haunted blues and clear-eyed reflections", adding that Lil Poppa "zooms in on specifics that make his lyrics feel alive, subverting cliche through real human emotion".

Lil Poppa released the album Almost Normal Again, a sequel to his 2019 mixtape Almost Normal, in 2025, the same time as his first headlining tour. According to HotNewHipHop, the album "deepen[ed] his reputation as one of rap's most introspective storytellers." On February 13, 2026, Lil Poppa released the single "Out of Town Bae", just five days prior to his death.

== Personal life ==
Wheeler dated Toie Roberts, daughter of rapper Rick Ross, and had one son. Wheeler's manager accused Roberts of restricting him from visiting his son, contributing to his mental health issues at the time of his death.

== Death ==
Wheeler was found dead in Fulton County, Georgia, on February 18, 2026, at the age of 25. Following an autopsy, the Fulton County medical examiner concluded that Wheeler had died from a self-inflicted gunshot wound to the head after he crashed his car on a highway near Hapeville, Georgia. Meek Mill, Lil Duval, Boosie Badazz, Yo Gotti, Rob49, Dej Loaf, Mozzy, Nardo Wick, Yungeen Ace, and Lil Baby paid tribute.

== Discography ==
=== Albums ===
- Blessed, I Guess (2021) – No. 160 Billboard 200
- HEAVY IS THE HEAD (2022) – No. 4 Billboard Heatseekers
- Half Man, Half Vamp (2023)
- WEE ARE WHO WE ARE (2024)
- Almost Normal Again (2025)

=== Extended plays ===
Title	EP details
Evergreen Wildchild (as That Boy Poppa)	Released: April 11, 2018; Label: Team Bigga Rankin; Formats: Digital download, streaming
It's Me, I'm The Problem	Released: December 8, 2023; Label: Interscope / CMG; Formats: Digital download, streaming

=== Mixtapes ===
List of mixtapes, with year released and selected chart positions
Title	Details	Peak chart positions
Title	Details	US
EST. 2000 (as That Boy Poppa)	Released: August 20, 2016; Label: Team Bigga Rankin; Format: Digital download, streaming	—
Life After Desi	Released: August 30, 2017; Label: Wildchild; Format: Digital download, streaming	—
Under Investigation	Released: October 29, 2018; Label: Wildchild; Format: Digital download, streaming	—
Under Investigation 2	Released: March 22, 2019; Label: Interscope / Rule #1; Format: Digital download, streaming	—
Almost Normal	Released: December 13, 2019; Label: Interscope / Rule #1; Format: Digital download, streaming	—
Evergreen Wildchild 2	Released: May 29, 2020; Label: Interscope / Rule #1; Format: Digital download, streaming	—
Under Investigation 3	Released: April 27, 2022; Label: Interscope / CMG; Format: Digital download, streaming	194
ENJOY THE SHOW (with Jdot Breezy)	Released: September 15, 2023; Label: CMG / Hitmaker Music Group / Blac Noize!; Format: Digital download, streaming	—
"—" denotes a title that did not chart, or was not released in that territory.

=== Singles ===
==== As lead artist ====
List of singles, with showing year released, certifications and album name
Title	Year	Album(s)
"Nightmare on Elm Street"	2018	Under Investigation
"Purple Hearts"	2018	Under Investigation
"Out Of Town Bae"	2026	Non-album single

==== As featured artist ====
List of singles as a featured artist, showing year released and album name
Title	Year	Album
"Pricetag" (Mozzy featuring Polo G and Lil Poppa)	2020	Beyond Bulletproof
"Grammy" (FCG Heem featuring Lil Poppa)	2022	Non-album single

=== Other certified songs ===
List of singles, with showing year released, certifications and album name
Title	Year	Certifications	Album(s)
"Love & War"	2021	RIAA: Gold	Blessed, I Guess
