= Yeah Glo! =

2024 single by GloRilla

Single by GloRilla

from the album Ehhthang Ehhthang
- Released: February 9, 2024
- Genre: Memphis rap; crunk
- Length: 2:22
- Label: Collective; Interscope
- Songwriters: Gloria Woods; Timothy McKibbins; Kevin Price; Julius Rivera III; Jaucquez Lowe
- Producers: B100; Go Grizzly; Squat Beats; Lil Ronnie

GloRilla singles chronology
"Jealous Ass Bitch" (2023)	"Yeah Glo!" (2024)	"Finesse" (2024)

Music video
- "Yeah Glo!" on YouTube

"Yeah Glo!" is a song by American rapper GloRilla from her second mixtape Ehhthang Ehhthang (2024). It was released on February 9, 2024, through Collective Music Group and Interscope Records, as the lead single from the mixtape. The song was produced by B100, Go Grizzly and Squat Beats, and peaked within the top 40 of the US Billboard Hot 100. "Yeah Glo!" also earned two nominations at the 2025 Grammy Awards for Best Rap Song and Best Rap Performance.

== Background ==
On January 8, 2024, GloRilla posted a snippet of the song on Instagram. The song is inspired by rapper Juicy J's "Yeah hoe!" ad-lib.

== Composition ==
"Yeah Glo!" is a Memphis rap and crunk-infused song, with bass, kick drums and cowbells in the production. It samples the song "Run Up Get Dun Up" by the St. Louis rap group DaBanggaz314. GloRilla brags about her luxurious life resulting from her success as a rapper, and says she "might embarrass you" if asked for a collaboration. The song also has a call-and-response chorus.

== Music video ==
The music video was directed by Troy Roscoe. In it, GloRilla is shown riding in the back of a Maybach truck, working in a fast food restaurant, and handing money to children in her neighborhood. She is also seen "revisiting different versions of her younger self".

== Awards and nominations ==
Year	Ceremony	Category	Result	Ref.
2024	BET Awards	BET Her Award	Nominated	
2024	BET Hip-Hop Awards	Song of the Year	Nominated	
2024	BET Hip-Hop Awards	Impact Track	Nominated	
2024	MTV Video Music Awards	Best Hip-Hop	Nominated	
2025	Grammy Awards	Best Rap Song	Nominated	
2025	Grammy Awards	Best Rap Performance	Nominated	

== Charts ==
=== Weekly charts ===
Weekly chart performance for "Yeah Glo!"
Chart (2024)	Peak position
Australia Hip Hop/R&B (ARIA)	35
Canada Hot 100 (Billboard)	88
Global 200 (Billboard)	159
New Zealand (Recorded Music NZ)	27
US Billboard Hot 100	28
US Hot R&B/Hip-Hop Songs (Billboard)	7
US Rhythmic Airplay (Billboard)	11

=== Year-end charts ===
2024 year-end chart performance for "Yeah Glo!"
Chart (2024)	Position
US Billboard Hot 100	44
US Hot R&B/Hip-Hop Songs (Billboard)	17
US Rhythmic (Billboard)	47

== Certifications ==
Certifications for "Yeah Glo!"
Region	Certification	Certified units/sales
New Zealand (RMNZ)	Platinum	30,000^{‡}
United States (RIAA)	3× Platinum	3,000,000^{‡}
^{‡} Sales+streaming figures based on certification alone.
