= ILBB2 =

2024 single by Jorjiana

Single by Jorjiana
- Released: October 21, 2024
- Genre: Hip hop
- Length: 1:36
- Songwriter: Jorja Faith-Wilson
- Producers: BanDoGoCrazy; FX; Jxytos

Jorjiana singles chronology
"Idk" (2024)	"ILBB2" (2024)	"Turn You Up" (2024)

Remix cover
- Cover art of the official remix featuring GloRilla.

GloRilla singles chronology
"Lay Down (Remix)" (2024)	"ILBB2 (Remix)" (2025)	"Hell Woods 2" (2025)

Music video
- "ILBB2 feat. GloRilla" on YouTube
- "ILBB2 feat. Babychiefdoit" on YouTube

"ILBB2" is a song by American rapper Jorjiana, released on October 21, 2024. Considered one of her breakout hits, it was followed by two official remixes; the first features American rapper GloRilla and the second features American rapper BabyChiefDoit.

== Composition ==
The song contains a Detroit hip-hop style instrumental with "glitchy and rumbling sounds", over which Jorjiana raps off-beat in a more "conversational, nonchalant delivery".

== Remixes ==
The first official remix features GloRilla and was released on February 21, 2025. Zachary Horvath of HotNewHipHop gave a positive review of GloRilla's performance, commenting "For us though, GloRilla really livens this track up by breaking up the monotonous tone that 'ILBB2' has. Her flow is faster, more aggressive and just as charismatic as Jorjiana." A music video premiered alongside the song; it is an aerobics-themed clip that sees Jorjiana and GloRilla surrounded by backup exercisers. In her verse, GloRilla raps "Like my niggas tall and brown (What else?) / And mixed with a little bit of ugly", before shouting out to YouTube personality Duke Dennis in the outro: "Uh, uh-huh, they say shooters shoot / Uh, uh-huh, Duke Dennis, what's up with you?" Dennis reacted to her lyrics during a livestream chat, saying while laughing, "Those two lines is separate, though, right? You weren't talking about me — I think it was like 'uh-uhs' in between, you know, two different people. I don't know who she was talking about." Shortly after the remix was released, it went viral on the video-sharing app TikTok due to a popular trend based on the lyric "they say shooters shoot".

The second remix features BabyChiefDoit and was released on March 13, 2025.
