= Wanna Be =

2024 single by GloRilla and Megan Thee Stallion

- Remix cover

Single by GloRilla and Megan Thee Stallion

from the album Ehhthang Ehhthang
- Released: April 5, 2024
- Genre: Hip hop
- Length: 2:36 (original); 3:44 (remix)
- Label: Collective; Interscope
- Songwriters: Gloria Woods; Megan Pete
- Producers: Ace Charisma; Payday; MKMentality; Yo Gotti

GloRilla singles chronology
"Finesse (Remix)" (2024)	"Wanna Be" (2024)	"TGIF" (2024)

Megan Thee Stallion singles chronology
"Hiss" (2024)	"Wanna Be" (2024)	"Boa" (2024)

Cardi B singles chronology
"Puntería" (2024)	"Wanna Be" (2024)	"On Dat Money" (2024)

Music video
- "Wanna Be" on YouTube

"Wanna Be" is a song by American rappers GloRilla and Megan Thee Stallion from the former's second mixtape Ehhthang Ehhthang (2024). It was released on April 5, 2024, through Collective Music Group and Interscope Records, as the second single from the mixtape. It was produced by Ace Charisma, Payday, MKMentality and Yo Gotti. The song contains samples of "Pretty Boy Swag" by Soulja Boy and "Don't Save Her" by Project Pat. A remix with Cardi B was released on May 31, 2024.

== Lyrics ==
Lyrically, GloRilla asserts her dominance over men and Megan Thee Stallion criticizes fake friends, with a reference to the anime series Attack on Titan as well. Both rappers also center on moving away from toxic men.

== Reception ==
Zachary Horvath of HotNewHipHop commented the rappers "deliver cutthroat performances". Brycen Saunders of Hypebeast wrote the song "serves as a reminder as to why both rappers are so loved – due to their original cadence and quintessentially confident demeanor."

On April 6, 2024, Megan Thee Stallion started a competition of twerking to the song on Instagram, with a video of herself twerking. The trend went viral, with rappers GloRilla, Latto, Coi Leray and Cardi B having participated in the challenge.

== Music video ==
The music video premiered alongside the single. Directed by Benny Boom, it finds the rappers crashing a fraternity party, where they are seen dancing.

== Remix ==
An official remix of the song featuring Cardi B was released on May 31, 2024. Cardi raps the first verse, opening with a comment of "bitches" being "boring" and "corny". She mentions she "got my toes white like Matthew McConaughey" and calls herself "a teacher" due to an individual wanting to "sub" her. In addition, Cardi B also takes shots at rapper Bia: "She did what? Had no idea (Idea) / Thought she was on the shelf, IKEA (IKEA) / Hope she talk like that when I see her (Woo) / Bitch, please, don't nobody wanna be ya (Ah)". Both GloRilla and Megan Thee Stallion's verses remain the same as they were on the original version.

Alex Gonzalez of Uproxx commented that Cardi B "opens the song unleashing the heat, stacking up bars full of clever wordplay and warnings to the opps." Armon Sadler of Vibe wrote "This mid-tempo pocket is ideal for her powerful delivery and braggadocious energy" and "GloRilla and Megan Thee Stallion had already smoked this record, but turning this into the new women's 'Big 3' anthem was very smart. It would've been nice to hear Cardi go back and forth with the other two as they did in the track’s original version, but we can’t get everything we want."

Bia responded to Cardi B's diss on X with the post "BITCHS IS WACK. BITCHS IS TRASH. I SHOULD HANG BITCHS RIGHT OVER MY KNEE, THE WAY I BE PUTTIN MY BELT TO THEY ASSSSSSSS", which plays on Cardi B's lyrics from her verse on "Clout" by Offset. She also posted a video of a rap battle with the instrumental of "Wanna Be" in the background, in which a rapper uses a line that falls flat.

== Commercial performance ==
In the United States, "Wanna Be" debuted at number 11 on the Billboard Hot 100, as well as number five on the Hot R&B/Hip-Hop Songs and Hot Rap Songs charts. It also debuted at number one on Digital Song Sales and number nine on Streaming Songs. Following the remix with Cardi B, the song rebounded in performance, jumping from number 39 to 15 on the Billboard Hot 100, number 11 to 5 on Hot R&B/Hip-Hop Songs, and number nine to a new peak at number four on Hot Rap Songs. During the first tracking week for the remix from May 31 to June 6, the single generated its biggest streaming week at 19.7 million streams, a 51% increase from the previous week, and ascended from number 35 to 15 on the Streaming Songs chart. It also sold 13,000 downloads, up 6,210% from the prior week, and re-entered the Digital Song Sales chart at number 4. In the same week, "Wanna Be" also achieved 7.1 million airplay audience impressions, an improvement of 115%. It jumped from number 36-17 on the R&B/Hip-Hop Airplay chart, up 113% in audience to 5.9 million, and debuted at number 37 on Rhythmic Airplay. Cardi B was listed on the radio airplay charts but not the multimetric charts, as the remix was responsible for the bulk of the song's airplay but not the majority of the song’s overall consumption during the tracking week.

== Awards and nominations ==
Year	Ceremony	Category	Nominee	Result	Ref.
2024	BET Hip Hop Awards	Best Collaboration	"Wanna Be"	Nominated	
2024	BET Hip Hop Awards	Best Featured Verse	Megan Thee Stallion	Nominated	
2024	BET Hip Hop Awards	Best Featured Verse	Cardi B (remix)	Nominated	
2024	MTV Video Music Awards	Best Collaboration	"Wanna Be"	Nominated	
2024	MTV Video Music Awards	Song of Summer	"Wanna Be"	Nominated	

== Track listing ==
- Streaming/digital download
1. "Wanna Be" (explicit) – 2:36
2. "Wanna Be" (clean) – 2:36
3. "Wanna Be" (chopped and screwed; explicit) – 2:55
4. "Wanna Be" (chopped and screwed; clean) – 2:55
5. "Wanna Be" (sped up; explicit) – 2:23
6. "Wanna Be" (sped up; clean) – 2:23
7. "Wanna Be" (slowed; explicit) – 2:56
8. "Wanna Be" (slowed; clean) – 2:56
9. "Wanna Be" (extended; explicit) – 3:04
10. "Wanna Be" (extended; clean) – 3:04
- Streaming/digital download – remix
1. "Wanna Be" (remix; explicit) – 3:44
2. "Wanna Be" (remix; clean) – 3:44
3. "Wanna Be" (chopped and screwed remix; explicit) – 4:12
4. "Wanna Be" (chopped and screwed remix; clean) – 4:12
5. "Wanna Be" (sped up remix; explicit) – 3:25
6. "Wanna Be" (sped up remix; clean) – 3:25
7. "Wanna Be" (slowed remix; explicit) – 4:12
8. "Wanna Be" (slowed remix; clean) – 4:12
9. "Wanna Be" (extended remix; explicit) – 4:08
10. "Wanna Be" (extended remix; clean) – 4:08

== Charts ==
=== Weekly charts ===
Weekly chart performance for "Wanna Be"
Chart (2024)	Peak position
Canada Hot 100 (Billboard)	80
Global 200 (Billboard)	38
New Zealand Hot Singles (RMNZ)	26
US Billboard Hot 100	11
US Hot R&B/Hip-Hop Songs (Billboard)	5

Weekly chart performance for "Wanna Be" (Remix)
Chart (2024)	Peak position
New Zealand Hot Singles (RMNZ)	25
US R&B/Hip-Hop Airplay (Billboard)	2
US Rhythmic Airplay (Billboard)	3

=== Year-end charts ===
2024 year-end chart performance for "Wanna Be"
Chart (2024)	Position
US Billboard Hot 100	40
US Hot R&B/Hip-Hop Songs (Billboard)	10
US Rhythmic (Billboard)	22

== Certifications ==
Certifications for "Wanna Be"
Region	Certification	Certified units/sales
Brazil (Pro-Música Brasil)	Gold	20,000^{‡}
New Zealand (RMNZ)	Gold	15,000^{‡}
United States (RIAA)	2× Platinum	2,000,000^{‡}
^{‡} Sales+streaming figures based on certification alone.

== Release history ==
Release dates and formats for "Wanna Be"
Region	Date	Format	Version	Label	Ref.
Various	April 5, 2024	Digital download; streaming	Original	Collective; Interscope	
Various	April 8, 2024	Digital download; streaming	Alternate versions	Collective; Interscope	
Various	May 31, 2024	Digital download; streaming	Remix	Collective; Interscope	
Various	May 31, 2024	Digital download; streaming	Remix alternate versions	Collective; Interscope	
United States	August 30, 2024	Rhythmic crossover	Original	Collective; Interscope	
