= Rocky Road (song) =

2022 single by Moneybagg Yo and Kodak Black

Single by Moneybagg Yo and Kodak Black

from the album Gangsta Art
- Released: May 16, 2022
- Length: 2:58
- Label: Collective; N-Less; Interscope
- Songwriters: Demario White, Jr.; Bill Kapri; Brayon Nelson; Bennett Eun; Robert Gullatt; Thomas Walker
- Producers: Mook On The Beats; BennettMakingHits; DrumGod; Skywalker OG

Moneybagg Yo singles chronology
"Wig" (2022)	"Rocky Road" (2022)	"See Wat I'm Sayin" (2022)

Kodak Black singles chronology
"Save the Day" (2022)	"Rocky Road" (2022)	"Slidin'" (2022)

Music video
- "Rocky Road" on YouTube

"Rocky Road" is a song by American rappers Moneybagg Yo and Kodak Black, released on May 16, 2022 with an accompanying music video. It serves as the lead single from American record label Collective Music Group's compilation album Gangsta Art (2022). The song was produced by Mook On The Beats, BennettMakingHits, DrumGod and Skywalker OG.

== Background ==
On the day of release, Moneybagg Yo spoke to Eddie Francis on Apple Music 1 about the song:

Anytime me and Kodak link up, there be chemistry… it be good. I wanted to come with a different tempo than "Lower Level", the other joint we have. It took us probably like two weeks to do it… when we went in there and did it… it came out good… I'm excited about the track… I feel like it's the warmup."

== Composition ==
Over piano-laden production, Moneybagg Yo and Kodak Black rap about topics such as their path to stardom, loyalty, surviving during times of struggle, staying focused on earning money, and "repping their cities". Kodak promises to do his baby mama better, while Moneybagg reveals how his girlfriend Ari Fletcher wants to have a child with him but he is too busy with making money and does not believe the timing is right, as well as going back to drinking lean.

== Music video ==
The music video was directed by Young Chang. It sees the rappers performing on a rooftop, while a storyline follows a man seeking revenge after a fight during a dice game, resulting in a murder. It is then revealed that after being stopped by a loved one, the man chooses to retaliate with his fists instead of a gun. The visual also shows a child's hair being done.

== Charts ==
Chart performance for "Rocky Road"
Chart (2022)	Peak position
US Bubbling Under Hot 100 (Billboard)	8
US Hot R&B/Hip-Hop Songs (Billboard)	38
