= List of Billboard Top R&B/Hip-Hop Albums number ones of 2025 =

This page lists the albums that reached number-one on the overall Billboard Top R&B/Hip-Hop Albums chart, the R&B Albums chart, and the Rap Albums chart in 2025. The R&B Albums and Rap Albums charts partly serve as respective distillations for R&B and rap-specific titles of the overall R&B/Hip-Hop Albums chart.

== Chart history ==
Key
†	Indicates best-performing album of 2025

Issue date	Top R&B/Hip-Hop Albums	Artist(s)	Top R&B Albums	Artist(s)	Top Rap Albums	Artist(s)	Ref.
January 4	SOS †	SZA	SOS †	SZA	GNX †	Kendrick Lamar	
January 11	SOS †	SZA	SOS †	SZA	GNX †	Kendrick Lamar	
January 18	WHAM	Lil Baby	SOS †	SZA	WHAM	Lil Baby	
January 25	SOS †	SZA	SOS †	SZA	GNX †	Kendrick Lamar	
February 1	SOS †	SZA	SOS †	SZA	Balloonerism	Mac Miller	
February 8	SOS †	SZA	SOS †	SZA	GNX †	Kendrick Lamar	
February 15	Hurry Up Tomorrow	The Weeknd	Hurry Up Tomorrow	The Weeknd	GNX †	Kendrick Lamar	
February 22	GNX	Kendrick Lamar	SOS †	SZA	GNX †	Kendrick Lamar	
March 1	Some Sexy Songs 4 U	PartyNextDoor and Drake	Some Sexy Songs 4 U	PartyNextDoor and Drake	GNX †	Kendrick Lamar	
March 8	Some Sexy Songs 4 U	PartyNextDoor and Drake	Some Sexy Songs 4 U	PartyNextDoor and Drake	GNX †	Kendrick Lamar	
March 15	GNX	Kendrick Lamar	Some Sexy Songs 4 U	PartyNextDoor and Drake	GNX †	Kendrick Lamar	
March 22	GNX	Kendrick Lamar	Some Sexy Songs 4 U	PartyNextDoor and Drake	GNX †	Kendrick Lamar	
March 29	Music	Playboi Carti	Some Sexy Songs 4 U	PartyNextDoor and Drake	Music	Playboi Carti	
April 5	Music	Playboi Carti	Some Sexy Songs 4 U	PartyNextDoor and Drake	Music	Playboi Carti	
April 12	Music	Playboi Carti	Some Sexy Songs 4 U	PartyNextDoor and Drake	Music	Playboi Carti	
April 19	Music	Playboi Carti	Some Sexy Songs 4 U	PartyNextDoor and Drake	Music	Playboi Carti	
April 26	More Chaos	Ken Carson	SOS †	SZA	More Chaos	Ken Carson	
May 3	SOS †	SZA	SOS †	SZA	GNX †	Kendrick Lamar	
May 10	SOS †	SZA	SOS †	SZA	GNX †	Kendrick Lamar	
May 17	SOS †	SZA	SOS †	SZA	GNX †	Kendrick Lamar	
May 24	SOS †	SZA	SOS †	SZA	GNX †	Kendrick Lamar	
May 31	SOS †	SZA	SOS †	SZA	GNX †	Kendrick Lamar	
June 7	SOS †	SZA	SOS †	SZA	GNX †	Kendrick Lamar	
June 14	SOS †	SZA	SOS †	SZA	GNX †	Kendrick Lamar	
June 21	Tha Carter VI	Lil Wayne	SOS †	SZA	Tha Carter VI	Lil Wayne	
June 28	Dopamine	Lil Tecca	SOS †	SZA	Dopamine	Lil Tecca	
July 5	SOS †	SZA	SOS †	SZA	GNX †	Kendrick Lamar	
July 12	SOS †	SZA	SOS †	SZA	Music	Playboi Carti	
July 19	SOS †	SZA	SOS †	SZA	GNX †	Kendrick Lamar	
July 26	JackBoys 2	JackBoys and Travis Scott	Swag	Justin Bieber	JackBoys 2	JackBoys and Travis Scott	
August 2	Don't Tap the Glass	Tyler, the Creator	Swag	Justin Bieber	Don't Tap the Glass	Tyler, the Creator	
August 9	Don't Tap the Glass	Tyler, the Creator	Swag	Justin Bieber	Don't Tap the Glass	Tyler, the Creator	
August 16	Thy Kingdom Come	Suicideboys	Swag	Justin Bieber	Thy Kingdom Come	Suicideboys	
August 23	The Last Wun	Gunna	Swag	Justin Bieber	The Last Wun	Gunna	
August 30	The Last Wun	Gunna	SOS †	SZA	The Last Wun	Gunna	
September 6	Cherry Bomb	Tyler, the Creator	Hearts Sold Separately	Mariah the Scientist	Cherry Bomb	Tyler, the Creator	
September 13	The Last Wun	Gunna	SOS †	SZA	The Last Wun	Gunna	
September 20	Swag	Justin Bieber	Swag	Justin Bieber	The Last Wun	Gunna	
September 27	Swag	Justin Bieber	Swag	Justin Bieber	The Last Wun	Gunna	
October 4	Am I the Drama?	Cardi B	SOS †	SZA	Am I the Drama?	Cardi B	
October 11	Am I the Drama?	Cardi B	Here for It All	Mariah Carey	Am I the Drama?	Cardi B	
October 18	Am I the Drama?	Cardi B	SOS †	SZA	Am I the Drama?	Cardi B	
October 25	Am I the Drama?	Cardi B	SOS †	SZA	Am I the Drama?	Cardi B	
November 1	Am I the Drama?	Cardi B	SOS †	SZA	Am I the Drama?	Cardi B	
November 8	Son of Spergy	Daniel Caesar	Son of Spergy	Daniel Caesar	Am I the Drama?	Cardi B	
November 15	Chromakopia	Tyler, the Creator	SOS †	SZA	Chromakopia	Tyler, the Creator	
November 22	SOS †	SZA	SOS †	SZA	Am I the Drama?	Cardi B	
November 29	Finally Over It	Summer Walker	Finally Over It	Summer Walker	Fear	NF	
December 6	Finally Over It	Summer Walker	Finally Over It	Summer Walker	Am I the Drama?	Cardi B	
December 13	The Christmas Song	Nat King Cole	The Christmas Song	Nat King Cole	The Diamond Collection	Post Malone	
December 20	The Christmas Song	Nat King Cole	The Christmas Song	Nat King Cole	The Leaks	Lil Baby	
December 27	What Happened to the Streets?	21 Savage	The Christmas Song	Nat King Cole	What Happened to the Streets?	21 Savage	

== See also ==
- 2025 in American music
- 2025 in hip hop music
- List of Billboard 200 number-one albums of 2025
- List of Billboard Hot R&B/Hip-Hop Songs number ones of 2025
