= Whatchu Kno About Me =

2024 song by GloRilla and Sexyy Red

Single by GloRilla and Sexyy Red

from the album Glorious
- Released: October 22, 2024
- Genre: Crunk
- Length: 2:29
- Label: CMG; Interscope
- Songwriters: Gloria Woods; Amari Freeman; Janae Wherry; Javaan Anderson; Jeremy Allen; Jonathan Reed; R. Jackson; Torrence Hatch; Webster Gardney Jr; Y. Davis
- Producers: Yo Gotti; Ace Charisma; Lil' Ronnie

GloRilla singles chronology
"Hollon" (2024)	"Whatchu Kno About Me" (2024)	"Sticky" (2024)

Sexyy Red singles chronology
"U Kno What to Do (UKWTD)" (2024)	"Whatchu Kno About Me" (2024)	"Sticky" (2024)

Music video
- "Whatchu Kno About Me" on YouTube

"Whatchu Kno About Me" (stylised in all caps) is a song by American rappers GloRilla and Sexyy Red. It was released to rhythmic contemporary radio on October 22, 2024, as the third single from the former's debut studio album, Glorious. Produced by Yo Gotti, Ace Charisma and Lil' Ronnie, the song samples "Wipe Me Down" by Lil Boosie.

== Critical reception ==
The song received generally positive reviews. Kyann-Sian Williams of NME commented that the artists recreate the "magic" of "TGIF" and "Hollon", further stating "they make the ultimate empowerment track and you can't help to do the chickenhead when Glo asserts: 'Every time I pop out, you know I A-T-E / I'm that bitch, hoe, get like me.'" Demicia Inman of Vibe remarked, "The song, arguably ready to carry both of their summer street dominations well into fall, prove they're both untouchable. They are equally 'giving hair, face, ass, titties.'" Peter A. Berry of Stereogum called it "a fun 'Wipe Me Down' remake where Sexyy takes home Bar-of-the-Day: 'I'm with my peoples [sic], and we comin' 50 deep/ You ain't know I was a hitta 'cause I'm always lookin' fleek." Vivian Medithi of Pitchfork wrote the song "feels like a mixtape loosie, but as fun as it is to hear the pair trade verses over a sample of 'Wipe Me Down,' the repurposing of Boosie Badazz's iconic flow veers toward karaoke."

== Music video ==
The music video was directed by Benny Boom. It sees GloRilla and Sexyy Red wearing fur coats over metallic bikinis and fuzzy boots, and rapping and shaking in their outfits. The setting alternates between a bright pink background and barbershop/beauty salon, with Boosie Badazz appearing with the rappers at the latter.

== In popular culture ==
The song was featured in the 2026 video game Grand Theft Auto VI, on the radio station Vice City Rap Radio.

== Charts ==
=== Weekly charts ===
Weekly chart performance for "Whatchu Kno About Me"
Chart (2024–2025)	Peak position
Australia Hip Hop/R&B (ARIA)	22
Australia New Music Singles (ARIA)	19
Canada Hot 100 (Billboard)	59
Global 200 (Billboard)	62
Greece International (IFPI)	26
New Zealand (Recorded Music NZ)	30
UK Singles (Official Charts)	93
UK Hip Hop/R&B (Official Charts)	33
US Billboard Hot 100	17
US Hot R&B/Hip-Hop Songs (Billboard)	3
US R&B/Hip-Hop Airplay (Billboard)	1
US Rhythmic Airplay (Billboard)	1

=== Year-end charts ===
Year-end chart performance for "Whatchu Kno About Me"
Chart (2025)	Position
US Billboard Hot 100	48
US Hot R&B/Hip-Hop Songs (Billboard)	10
US R&B/Hip-Hop Airplay (Billboard)	6
US Rhythmic Airplay (Billboard)	11

== Certifications ==
Certifications for "Whatchu Kno About Me"
Region	Certification	Certified units/sales
New Zealand (RMNZ)	Platinum	30,000^{‡}
United States (RIAA)	2× Platinum	2,000,000^{‡}
^{‡} Sales+streaming figures based on certification alone.
