= Shabooya =

2022 single by Hitkidd, Gloss Up and K Carbon featuring Slimeroni and Aleza

Single by Hitkidd, Gloss Up and K Carbon featuring Slimeroni and Aleza
- Released: September 30, 2022
- Genre: Crunk
- Length: 2:58
- Label: Blac Noize!; Campsouth
- Songwriters: Anthony Holmes, Jr.; Jerrica Russell; Kimbrya McCraney; Aja Canyon; Aleghsa Haywood
- Producer: Hitkidd

Hitkidd singles chronology
"F.N.F. (Let's Go) (Remix)" (2022)	"Shabooya" (2022)	"Kater to Me" (2022)

Gloss Up singles chronology
"Broke Boy (Pt. 2)" (2022)	"Shabooya" (2022)	"Alone" (2022)

K Carbon singles chronology
"Set the Tone" (2021)	"Shabooya" (2022)	"25 Days of Christmas" (2022)

Slimeroni singles chronology
"Bank Tella" (2022)	"Shabooya" (2022)	"25 Days of Christmas" (2022)

Aleza singles chronology
"Skin Tone" (2022)	"Shabooya" (2022)	"25 Days of Christmas" (2022)

Music video
- "Shabooya" on YouTube

"Shabooya" is a single by American record producer Hitkidd and American rappers Gloss Up and K Carbon featuring American rappers Slimeroni and Aleza. It was released on September 30, 2022, and is considered the breakout song of all four rappers.

== Composition ==
Adopting the style of a "Shabooya (Roll Call)" chant, the song sees each of the rappers introducing themselves and what they are all about in their own sense of humor, with all of them in favor of robbing men. The verses are accompanied with ad-libs.

Heven Haile of Pitchfork wrote, "On the track, the quartet is like a really hard version of the PowerPuff Girls, each showing off their distinct personality. Slimeroni's over-it goth girl vibe is counterbalanced by Aleza's bubbly stoner persona; Gloss Up asserts herself with the confident demeanor of a cheer captain, while Carbon is a rabble-rouser bragging about shitting on bitches and running through their man's money."

== Music video ==
A music video for the song was released alongside the single. It takes places in a high school setting.

== Critical reception ==
The song received generally positive reviews. Demicia Inman of Vibe wrote, "While each has a different style, their southern swagger and confident demeanor make an effortless posse cut where everyone gets their shine." Jon Caramanica placed the song at number 18 on his list of the best songs of 2022. Pitchfork included the song on their list of "The 43 Best Rap Songs of 2022".

== Remix ==
An official remix of the song with American rapper Lola Brooke was released on March 17, 2023.

== Charts ==
Chart performance for "Shabooya"
Chart (2023)	Peak position
US R&B/Hip-Hop Airplay (Billboard)	21
US Rhythmic (Billboard)	31
