= Finesse (BossMan Dlow song) =

2023 song by BossMan Dlow

- Cover art for the official remix

Single by BossMan Dlow

from the album 2 Slippery
- Released: March 25, 2024
- Genre: Hip hop; trap
- Length: 2:09
- Label: Alamo
- Songwriters: Devante McCreary; Daniel Schnabel
- Producer: Gentle Beatz

BossMan Dlow singles chronology
"4AM at Coffee Zone (Florida Avengers)" (2024)	"Finesse" (2024)

GloRilla singles chronology
"Yeah Glo!" (2024)	"Finesse (Remix)" (2024)	"Wanna Be" (2024)

Music video
- "Finesse" on YouTube
- "Finesse (Remix)" on YouTube

"Finesse" is a song by American rapper BossMan Dlow, released on December 20, 2023, from 2 Slippery, the deluxe edition of his debut mixtape Too Slippery (2023). It was produced by Gentle Beatz. An official remix of the song featuring American rapper GloRilla was released on March 25, 2024.

== Composition ==
Over a trap and plugg instrumental, the song begins with the chorus, in which BossMan Dlow brags about earning money through illicit means and that he can teach his methods to others. In the first verse, he reflects on his past crimes and current success and lifestyle, such as making money, driving fast and receiving many calls and texts on his phone.

== Critical reception ==
Peter A. Berry of Stereogum described the beat as "subdued, yet stylish". He also commented on the song, "BossMan gets off shit talk with ease, making street logistics sound like just another day at the office" and "Slick, yet emphatic, it's a level of cool you can't teach."

== Remix ==
The official remix of the song was released on March 25, 2024. It features a minute-long verse from GloRilla, who raps about outdoing her competition, her New Year's resolution of celibacy, and knack for winning over male partners, before ending with a reference to the Evil Queen from "Snow White".

== Charts ==
Chart performance for "Finesse"
Chart (2024)	Peak position
US Bubbling Under Hot 100 (Billboard)	1
US Hot R&B/Hip-Hop Songs (Billboard)	37
