= Anyways, Life's Great =

EP by GloRilla
- Released: November 11, 2022
- Genre: Hip-hop
- Length: 26:21
- Labels: CMG; Interscope

GloRilla chronology
P Status (2020)	Anyways, Life's Great (2022)	Ehhthang Ehhthang (2024)

Singles from Anyways, Life's Great
- 1. "F.N.F. (Let's Go)" Released: April 29, 2022; 2. "Blessed" Released: August 31, 2022; 3. "Tomorrow 2" Released: September 23, 2022

Anyways, Life's Great is the second extended play (EP) by American rapper GloRilla. It was released on November 11, 2022, by Collective Music Group (CMG) and Interscope Records. Upon its release, Anyways, Life's Great debuted at number 11 on the US Billboard 200 and was nominated for Album of the Year at the BET Awards. The bonus edition, alongside four new songs, was released on March 15, 2023. The EP was supported by three singles: "F.N.F. (Let's Go)" (with Hitkidd), "Blessed", and "Tomorrow 2" (with Cardi B), which reached the top ten of the US Billboard Hot 100.

== Background ==
The title of the EP comes from a line from "F.N.F. (Let's Go)" (Anyways, life’s great, pussy still good).

== Music and lyrics ==
On "No More Love", GloRilla talks about "envy within her circle, being let down by a guy she thought would be different and having to abort a child" in 2021. "Phatnall" is a "retort against GloRilla's exes". On "Unh Unh", she says "haters might think her 15 minutes of fame are over, but she’s only getting started."

== Critical reception ==
Professional ratings
Review scores
Source	Rating
AllMusic	3/5 stars
HipHopDX	3.9/5
Pitchfork	7.5/10

Vivian Medithi of HipHopDX wrote that the EP proves that Glorilla is "one of the most exciting new rappers of any gender" although it does not always "match the lofty promises of her hit singles". Heven Haile of Pitchfork praised her "agile and disarming" lyrics but pointed out "similar instrumentals and flow templates" of the songs.

Jessica McKinney of Complex wrote that "her thick and husky Southern accent makes her one of the most memorable voices in the game right now." Lawrence Burney of NPR claimed that "she could be a voice for her generation."

=== Year-end lists ===
Publication	List	Rank	Ref.
Complex	50 Best Albums of 2022	28	

== Awards and nominations ==
Award	Year	Category	Result	Ref.
BET Awards	2023	Album of the Year	Nominated	
BET Hip Hop Awards	2023	Album of the Year	Nominated	

== Track listing ==
No.	Title	Length
1.	"No More Love"	3:10
2.	"Phatnall"	2:55
3.	"Tomorrow 2" (with Cardi B)	3:29
4.	"Unh Unh"	2:49
5.	"Blessed"	3:36
6.	"Get That Money" (featuring Niki Pooh)	2:33
7.	"Nut Quick"	2:38
8.	"F.N.F. (Let's Go)"	2:17
9.	"Out Loud Thinking"	2:50
Total length:		26:21

Bonus edition (Apple Music edition)

No.	Title	Length
1.	"Don't Know (GloRidaz Bonus)"	2:32
2.	"Nut Quick (Original)"	2:38
3.	"Phatnall (Original)"	2:55
4.	"Get That Money (Original)" (featuring Niki Pooh)	2:33
5.	"Up Next: GloRilla (Exclusive)" (video)	3:37

== Charts ==
=== Weekly charts ===
Weekly chart performance for Anyways, Life's Great
Chart (2022)	Peak position
US Billboard 200	11
US Top R&B/Hip-Hop Albums (Billboard)	5

=== Year-end charts ===
Year-end chart performance for Anyways, Life's Great
Chart (2023)	Position
US Top R&B/Hip-Hop Albums (Billboard)	85

== Certifications ==
Certifications for Anyways, Life's Great
Region	Certification	Certified units/sales
United States (RIAA)	Gold	500,000^{‡}
^{‡} Sales+streaming figures based on certification alone.
