= See Wat I'm Sayin =

2022 single by Moneybagg Yo

Single by Moneybagg Yo

from the album Gangsta Art
- Released: May 27, 2022
- Length: 2:26
- Label: Collective; Interscope; N-Less
- Songwriters: Demario White, Jr.; Brytavious Chambers; Robert Gullatt
- Producers: Tay Keith; DrumGod

Moneybagg Yo singles chronology
"Rocky Road" (2022)	"See Wat I'm Sayin" (2022)	"Supercharge" (2022)

Music video
- "See Wat I'm Sayin" on YouTube

"See Wat I'm Sayin" is a song by American rapper Moneybagg Yo, released on May 27, 2022. It was produced by Tay Keith and DrumGod.

== Composition ==
In the song, Moneybagg Yo details him keeping women by his side, gives warnings to the opposition and questions why he would be taken as a joke, over a beat with a heavy bass.

== Music video ==
The music video was released alongside the single. It shows Moneybagg Yo "making his way through multiple women".

== Charts ==
Chart performance for "See Wat I'm Sayin"
Chart (2022)	Peak position
US Billboard Hot 100	59
US Hot R&B/Hip-Hop Songs (Billboard)	14
US Rhythmic Airplay (Billboard)	23

== Certifications ==
Region	Certification	Certified units/sales
United States (RIAA)	Gold	500,000^{‡}
^{‡} Sales+streaming figures based on certification alone.
