= TGIF (song) =

2024 single by GloRilla

Single by GloRilla

from the album Glorious
- Released: June 21, 2024
- Recorded: 2024
- Genre: Hip-hop; trap
- Length: 2:44
- Label: Collective; Interscope
- Songwriters: Gloria Woods; Yakki Davis; Lucas Alegria; Mario Mims; Jorge M. Taveras; Jess Jackson; Ronnie Jackson; Dillon Brophy
- Producers: Zenjikozen; Jess Jackson; Brophy

GloRilla singles chronology
"Wanna Be (Remix)" (2024)	"TGIF" (2024)	"Get in There" (2024)

Music video
- "TGIF" on YouTube

"TGIF" is a song by American rapper GloRilla from her debut studio album, Glorious (2024). It was released on June 21, 2024 via Collective Music Group and Interscope Records as the lead single from the album. It was produced by Zenjikozen, Jess Jackson and Dillon Brophy.

== Background ==
On May 17, 2024, GloRilla previewed the song on social media, through a snippet of her with friends during a tour stop. The song immediately became a viral sensation, with the lyrics "It's 7 PM Friday / It's ninety-five degrees / I ain't got no nigga and no nigga ain't got me" being widely used in dance videos on TikTok. GloRilla also started performing the song during her opening act at fellow rapper Megan Thee Stallion's Hot Girl Summer Tour. Barbadian singer and businesswoman Rihanna posted a video rapping to this song to her partner A$AP Rocky, going viral on all social media platforms. In that year, a TikTok account mixed Beyonce Giselle Knowles's song Diva (Beyoncé song) to TGIF. It quickly became an iconic trend on Social Media.

== Composition ==
The song contains trap production, over which GloRilla boasts her success, referencing the high attendance during her concerts and telling her haters to "kiss my ass". She also raps about spending time with her female friends and having sexual relationships with others' boyfriends.

== Critical reception ==
Robin Murray of Clash wrote of the song, "The beat is hard, the production is crisp, but really it's just an excuse to witness GloRilla do her thing." Armon Sadler of Vibe wrote "'TGIF' oozes confidence and composure. Her delivery is passionate, but the production isn't overwhelming. It doubles as a song people can turn up to, but also as cinematic music that one would hear when a crew walks into a venue." Rodney Carmichael of NPR wrote that the song "might certify GloRilla as the hardest voice in hip-hop".

TIME Magazine has ranked “TGIF” as the #1 best song of 2024.

Critics' year-end rankings of "TGIF"
Publication	List	Rank	Ref.
NPR	124 Best Songs of 2024	—N/a	

== Music video ==
An official music video was released on June 24, 2024. Directed by Jerry Morka and Diesel Filmz, it sees GloRilla and her friends twerking atop her tour bus in the desert and dancing on a beach, where GloRilla flaunts a bikini and receives a manicure and pedicure. She also appears onstage and in the back of an all-terrain vehicle.

== Charts ==
=== Weekly charts ===
Weekly chart performance for "TGIF"
Chart (2024)	Peak position
Global 200 (Billboard)	32
New Zealand Hot Singles (RMNZ)	24
US Billboard Hot 100	22
US Hot R&B/Hip-Hop Songs (Billboard)	4
US R&B/Hip-Hop Airplay (Billboard)	1
US Rhythmic Airplay (Billboard)	2

=== Year-end charts ===
2024 year-end chart performance for "TGIF"
Chart (2024)	Position
US Hot R&B/Hip-Hop Songs (Billboard)	34
US R&B/Hip-Hop Airplay (Billboard)	24

2025 year-end chart performance for "TGIF"
Chart (2025)	Position
US Hot R&B/Hip-Hop Songs (Billboard)	40
US R&B/Hip-Hop Airplay (Billboard)	7

== Certifications ==
Certifications for "TGIF"
Region	Certification	Certified units/sales
Brazil (Pro-Música Brasil)	Gold	20,000^{‡}
New Zealand (RMNZ)	Gold	15,000^{‡}
United States (RIAA)	2× Platinum	2,000,000^{‡}
^{‡} Sales+streaming figures based on certification alone.
