= F.N.F. (Let's Go) =

2022 single by Hitkidd and GloRilla

Single by Hitkidd and GloRilla

from the EP Anyways, Life's Great
- Released: April 29, 2022
- Recorded: 2022
- Genre: Crunk
- Length: 2:17
- Label: Blac Noize; Campsouth; Interscope
- Songwriters: Anthony Holmes, Jr.; Gloria Woods
- Producer: Hitkidd

Hitkidd singles chronology
"Set the Tone" (2021)	"F.N.F. (Let's Go)" (2022)	"Shabooya" (2022)

GloRilla singles chronology
"Common Denominator" (2021)	"F.N.F. (Let's Go)" (2022)	"Sneaky Link" (2022)

Music video
- "F.N.F. (Let's Go)" on YouTube

"F.N.F. (Let's Go)" is a song by American record producer Hitkidd and American rapper GloRilla. It was released on April 29, 2022 as the first single from her debut EP, Anyways, Life's Great (2022). The song went viral through the video-sharing app TikTok and is considered the breakout hit for both artists.

== Background ==
Hitkidd produced the instrumental of the song for a project he began working on in April 2022. He sent the beat to rapper Megan Thee Stallion, but when he did not receive a response, Hitkidd sent it to GloRilla instead. According to GloRilla, at the time he called, she "was on the toilet and gonna get my lashes done". Hitkidd requested that they create a summer anthem that the "girls can chant". They soon met at the studio. GloRilla requested to step out to smoke some Backwoods, and then came up with the lyrics, "I'm F-R-E-E, fuck nigga free". Within 30 minutes, they recorded the song that became "F.N.F. (Let's Go)".

GloRilla recorded a since-deleted Triller video of her lighting a Backwood in the bathroom and playing the song. Through Hitkidd's advice on increasing the song's exposure, GloRilla changed her explicit second verse to boost radio play, and shot a music video for it. The video was shot by Ricco, who finished editing it that same night. The song was released the next day, and the music video was released alongside the single. It sees GloRilla and her friends "wilding out" and drinking.

Two days later, Blac Noize! Recordings and Big Machine Label Group approached Hitkidd to re-release "F.N.F." on streaming platforms through their hip hop label venture. Soon after the song was made available on streaming platforms, it quickly gained recognition and popularity on TikTok. The song was also remixed by other artists.

== Composition ==
"F.N.F. (Let's Go)" is a crunk song, in which GloRilla raps about her freedom after ending her relationship with a womanizer and embracing spending time with her girlfriends instead. The beat has been described as having a "menacing key loop and propulsive drums".

== Critical reception ==
The song received generally positive reviews. Music critics have considered it a summer anthem. Brandon Callender described the production as "catchy enough to keep your ears perked". C.G. of XXL wrote, "From the spelling on the hook—'I'm F-R-E-E, fuck-n***a-free'—to her witty insults—'He say, "Y'all be living fast," nah, pussy boy, you slow', Big Glo's got the bars to match the charisma, and there's a whole lot of it. Hitkidd's pulsing production lends itself to the carefree nature of the rap newcomer's rhymes as well."

=== Year-end lists ===
Publication	List	Rank	Ref.
Los Angeles Times	100 Best Songs of 2022	35	
NPR	100 Best Songs of 2022	1	
Pitchfork	100 Best Songs of 2022	3	
Time	10 Best Songs of 2022	4	

== Awards and nominations ==
Awards	Year	Category	Result	Ref.
BET Awards	2023	Best Collaboration	Nominated	
BET Hip Hop Awards	2022	Song of the Year	Nominated	
Grammy Awards	2023	Best Rap Performance	Nominated	

== Remixes ==
Several artists have released freestyles to the song, including Renni Rucci, Kaliii and Erica Banks. On September 9, 2022, an official remix featuring rappers Latto and JT (of City Girls) was released. Originally, American rapper Saweetie was supposed to be featured on said remix. However Hitkidd confirmed Saweetie was replaced on the remix due to paperwork issues.

== Chart performance ==
The song debuted at number 91 on the Billboard Hot 100, becoming the first charting song for both Hitkidd and GloRilla. The song peaked at number 42 on the Billboard Hot 100 and number one on the Mainstream R&B/Hip-Hop Airplay chart.

== Charts ==
=== Weekly charts ===
Weekly chart performance for "F.N.F. (Let's Go)"
Chart (2022)	Peak position
US Billboard Hot 100	42
US Hot R&B/Hip-Hop Songs (Billboard)	11
US Rhythmic Airplay (Billboard)	11

=== Year-end charts ===
2022 year-end chart performance for "F.N.F. (Let's Go)"
Chart (2022)	Position
US Hot R&B/Hip-Hop Songs (Billboard)	29

== Certifications ==
Certifications for "F.N.F. (Let's Go)"
Region	Certification	Certified units/sales
United States (RIAA)	Platinum	1,000,000^{‡}
^{‡} Sales+streaming figures based on certification alone.
