= GloRilla =

American rapper (born 1999)

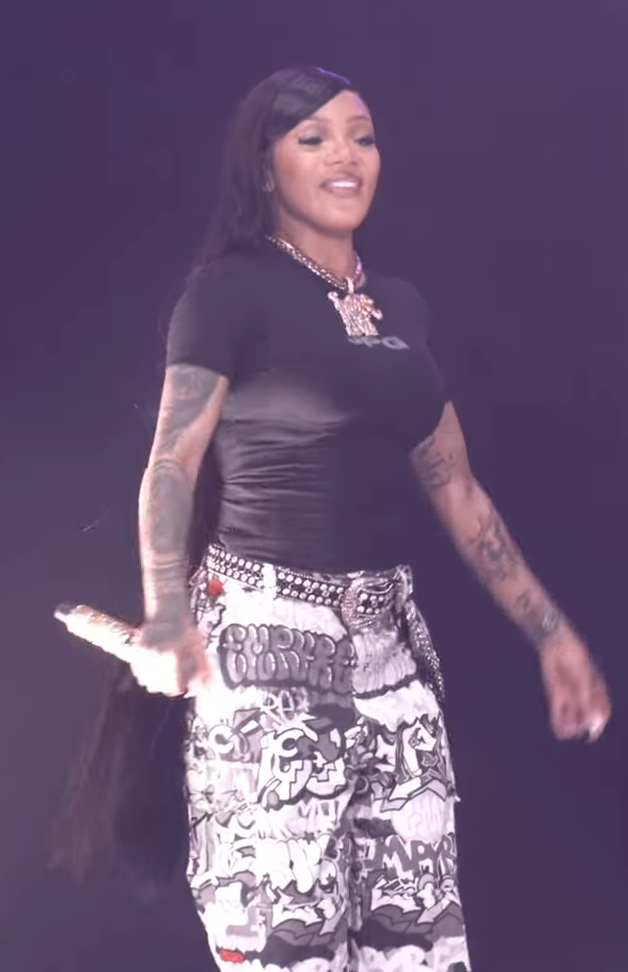
- GloRilla in 2025
- Born: Gloria Hallelujah Woods; July 28, 1999 (age 27); Memphis, Tennessee, U.S.
- Other name: Big Glo
- Occupation: Rapper
- Years active: 2019–present
- Musical career
- Genres: Southern hip-hop; crunk; trap
- Works: Discography
- Labels: Collective; Interscope
- Website: glorillaofficial.com

Gloria Hallelujah Woods (born July 28, 1999), known professionally as GloRilla, is an American rapper from Memphis, Tennessee. She first became known for her 2022 single "F.N.F. (Let's Go)" (with Hitkidd), which peaked within the top 50 of the Billboard Hot 100 and was nominated for Best Rap Performance at the 65th Annual Grammy Awards. Its success led her to sign with fellow Memphis rapper Yo Gotti's record label, Collective Music Group, in July of that year.

Her follow-up single, "Tomorrow", spawned a remixed sequel (with Cardi B) that became her first top-ten hit on the Billboard Hot 100 and received double platinum certification by the Recording Industry Association of America (RIAA). Both songs, along with the gold-certified single "Blessed", preceded the release of her debut extended play (EP), Anyways, Life's Great in November, which entered the Billboard 200 at number 11. She won Best New Hip-Hop Artist at the 2022 BET Hip Hop Awards, and won in a similar category at the 2023 iHeartRadio Music Awards.

Her 2024 singles, "Yeah Glo!" and "Wanna Be" (with Megan Thee Stallion), both peaked within the top 40 of the Billboard Hot 100 and preceded her debut commercial mixtape, Ehhthang Ehhthang (2024), which peaked at number 18 on the Billboard 200. Her third top 40-single of that year, "TGIF", preceded her debut studio album Glorious (2024), which peaked at number five.

== Early life ==
Woods was born in Memphis, Tennessee. She was homeschooled until fifth grade, and later attended Melrose High School. She started rapping when she was 16.

Growing up, she was a part of her church's choir; as a result, Woods initially wanted to be a singer, but after losing her voice, she decided to switch to rap. She is the eighth out of 10 children. Woods has stated she is cousins with Cardi B and Lil Uzi Vert.

== Career ==
Woods released her mixtape Most Likely Up Next in 2019 and her EP P Status in 2020.

In April 2022, Woods found increased fame and popularity with the release of "F.N.F. (Let's Go)" with producer Hitkidd. The song went viral and led to a #FNFChallenge on TikTok. A remix of the song featuring Latto and JT was released in September, with the announcement that a remix with Saweetie would follow. The song led her to be nominated for two awards at the 2022 BET Hip Hop Awards, where she also performed in October.

In June 2022, Woods and Duke Deuce released the song "Just Say That." In July, she signed with fellow Memphis rapper Yo Gotti's record label Collective Music Group. She was featured on the compilation album Gangsta Art. In September, she released the song "Tomorrow 2" featuring Cardi B. In November, she dropped her EP Anyways, Life's Great. She was featured along with rapper Gangsta Boo on the Latto single "FTCU".

In January 2023, she and labelmate Moneybagg Yo collaborated on the single "On Wat U On". In February, a stampede at a concert at the Main Street Armory in Rochester, New York resulted in 3 deaths and 7 people injured. The stampede started after audience members thought they heard gunshots while people were leaving the venue. In June, she was selected as 2023 XXL Freshmen Class.

In 2024, GloRilla released the top-40 songs "Yeah Glo!" and "Wanna Be" (with Megan Thee Stallion) as singles from her debut commercial mixtape, Ehhthang Ehhthang, which was released on April 5. She released her debut studio album Glorious on October 13. It peaked at number five on the Billboard 200, and had highest first-week sales of any album released by a female rapper in 2024. Its singles—"TGIF", "Hollon", and "Whatchu Kno About Me"— all charted in the top 50 in the US. She was also featured on "Sticky" by Tyler, the Creator, a song from the album Chromakopia which was released on October 28. In support of Glorious, GloRilla embarked on the Glorious Tour in March 2025, which concluded in July.

In August 2025, Woods partnered with the fast-food chain Checkers & Rally’s to launch a promotional $4 "Unbeatable Meal Deal", which included limited-edition items such as "Glo’s BBQ Jacked Burger". The collaboration was described as a "full-circle moment", as she had previously worked at a Checkers drive-thru in Memphis before rising to fame.

== Copyright dispute ==
In November 2024, rapper Plies filed a copyright lawsuit against GloRilla, Megan Thee Stallion, and Soulja Boy. Plies alleged that the 2010 song "Pretty Boy Swag" by Soulja Boy, contained an uncleared sample from his song, "Me & My Goons" released in 2008. Plies did not seek copyright infringement against Soulja Boy at the time. Upon the release of Glorilla's song "Wanna Be" which includes an approved sample of "Pretty Boy Swag", Plies filed a claim for both songs. Soulja Boy denied any wrongdoing and stated that his composition was original. In March 2025, Plies voluntarily dismissed the lawsuit against all parties.

== Artistry ==
Woods describes her music as "crunk and dominant". She is known for her "deep and textured drawl". Woods was inspired by Chief Keef.

== Personal life ==
In September 2022, Woods donated $25,000 to her high school, Martin Luther King College Prep, in Memphis, Tennessee. In December 2024, Woods donated $25,000 to her alma mater, Melrose High School in Memphis, which went to the creation of a media center named after her.

In October 2024, Woods endorsed the presidential campaign of Kamala Harris. On November 1, 2024, Woods performed at one of her rallies in Milwaukee.

=== Legal issues ===
In April 2024, Woods was arrested and charged with a DUI in Gwinnett County, Georgia. She reportedly failed a sobriety test after being pulled over for making an improper U-turn. She was released on a $1,956 bond.

In July 2025, Woods's home was burglarized by several unknown masked intruders. After arriving at the scene, law enforcement officers did not locate the burglars, but charged Woods with possession of marijuana found in a bedroom closet. She was briefly arrested and was released on a $22,260 bond.

== Discography ==
Studio albums

- Glorious (2024)

== Filmography ==
Year	Title	Role	Notes
2023	RapCaviar Presents	Herself	Guest; Episode: "Coi Leray - Hate Me Now"
2023	Wild 'n Out	Herself	Guest; Season 19, Episode 2

== Tours ==
Headlining

- Glorious Tour (2025)

Opening act

- Lil Baby – It's Only Us Tour (2023)
- Megan Thee Stallion – Hot Girl Summer Tour (2024)

== Awards and nominations ==
Organization	Year	Award	Work	Result	Ref.
American Music Awards	2022	Favorite Female Hip-Hop Artist	Herself	Nominated	
BET Awards	2023	Album of the Year	Anyways, Life's Great	Nominated	
BET Awards	2023	Video of the Year	"Tomorrow 2" (with Cardi B)	Nominated	
BET Awards	2023	Best Collaboration	"Tomorrow 2" (with Cardi B)	Nominated	
BET Awards	2023	Best Collaboration	"F.N.F. (Let's Go)"	Nominated	
BET Awards	2023	Best New Artist	Herself	Nominated	
BET Awards	2023	Best Female Hip Hop Artist	Herself	Nominated	
BET Awards	2024	Best Female Hip Hop Artist	Herself	Nominated	
BET Awards	2024	BET Her Award	"Yeah Glo!"	Nominated	
BET Awards	2025	Album of the Year	Glorious	Nominated	
BET Awards	2025	Viewer's Choice	"TGIF"	Nominated	
BET Awards	2025	Best Collaboration	"Sticky"	Nominated	
BET Awards	2025	Best Female Hip Hop Artist	Herself	Nominated	
BET Awards	2025	BET Her Award	"In My Bag"	Nominated	
BET Awards	2025	Dr. Bobby Jones Best Gospel/Inspirational Award	"Rain Down on Me"	Won	
BET Awards	2026	Best Female Hip Hop Artist	Herself	Nominated	
BET Hip Hop Awards	2022	Best Breakthrough Hip Hop Artist	Herself	Won	
BET Hip Hop Awards	2022	Song of the Year	"F.N.F. (Let's Go)"	Nominated	
BET Hip Hop Awards	2023	Hip Hop Artist of the Year	Herself	Nominated	
BET Hip Hop Awards	2023	Hip Hop Album of the Year	Anyways, Life's Great	Nominated	
BET Hip Hop Awards	2023	Song of the Year	"Tomorrow 2" (with Cardi B)	Nominated	
BET Hip Hop Awards	2023	Best Hip Hop Video	"Tomorrow 2" (with Cardi B)	Nominated	
BET Hip Hop Awards	2023	Best Collaboration	"Tomorrow 2" (with Cardi B)	Nominated	
BET Hip Hop Awards	2024	Hip Hop Artist of the Year	Herself	Nominated	
BET Hip Hop Awards	2024	Hip Hop Album of the Year	Ehhthang Ehhthang	Nominated	
BET Hip Hop Awards	2024	Song of the Year	"Yeah Glo!"	Nominated	
BET Hip Hop Awards	2024	Impact Track	"Yeah Glo!"	Nominated	
BET Hip Hop Awards	2024	Best Collaboration	"Wanna Be" (with Megan Thee Stallion)	Nominated	
BET Hip Hop Awards	2024	Hustler of the Year	Herself	Nominated	
BET Hip Hop Awards	2024	Best Live Performer	Herself	Nominated	
Billboard Music Awards	2024	Top Rap Female Artist	Herself	Nominated	
Billboard Women in Music	2025	Powerhouse Award	Herself	Won	
BMI Awards	2024	Most Performed Songs of the Year	"F.N.F. (Let's Go)"	Won	
BMI Awards	2024	Most Performed Songs of the Year	"Tomorrow 2"	Won	
BMI Awards	2025	Most Performed Songs of the Year	"TGIF"	Won	
BMI Awards	2025	Most Performed Songs of the Year	"Wanna Be"	Won	
BMI Awards	2025	Most Performed Songs of the Year	"Yeah Glo!"	Won	
BMI Awards	2025	BMI Impact Award	Herself	Won	
BMI Awards	2025	Songwriter of the Year	Herself	Won	
Grammy Awards	2023	Best Rap Performance	"F.N.F. (Let's Go)"	Nominated	
Grammy Awards	2025	Best Rap Performance	"Yeah Glo!"	Nominated	
Grammy Awards	2025	Best Rap Song	"Yeah Glo!"	Nominated	
Grammy Awards	2026	Best Rap Song	"Sticky"	Nominated	
Grammy Awards	2026	Best Rap Song	"TGIF"	Nominated	
Grammy Awards	2026	Best Rap Album	Glorious	Nominated	
IHeartRadio Music Awards	2023	Hip-Hop Song of the Year	"F.N.F. (Let's Go)"	Nominated	
IHeartRadio Music Awards	2023	Best New Hip-Hop Artist	Herself	Won	
IHeartRadio Music Awards	2024	Best Collaboration	"Tomorrow 2" (with Cardi B)	Nominated	
IHeartRadio Music Awards	2024	R&B Song of the Year	"Tomorrow 2" (with Cardi B)	Nominated	
IHeartRadio Music Awards	2025	Hip-Hop Song of the Year	"TGIF"	Nominated	
IHeartRadio Music Awards	2025	Hip-Hop Artist of the Year	Herself	Won	
IHeartRadio Music Awards	2025	Favorite Tour Style	Hot Girl Summer Tour (with Megan Thee Stallion)	Nominated	
IHeartRadio Music Awards	2025	Favorite Surprise Guest	Cardi B (with Megan Thee Stallion)	Nominated	
IHeartRadio Music Awards	2026	Best Collaboration	"Whatchu Kno About Me" (with Sexyy Red)	Nominated	
IHeartRadio Music Awards	2026	Hip-Hop Song of the Year	"Whatchu Kno About Me" (with Sexyy Red)	Nominated	
IHeartRadio Music Awards	2026	Hip-Hop Artist of the Year	Herself	Nominated	
IHeartRadio Music Awards	2026	K-Pop Song of the Year	"Killin' It Girl" (with J-Hope)	Nominated	
MTV Europe Music Awards	2023	Best Push	Herself	Nominated	
MTV Video Music Awards	2023	Best New Artist	Herself	Nominated	
MTV Video Music Awards	2023	Best Hip Hop	"Tomorrow 2" (with Cardi B)	Nominated	
MTV Video Music Awards	2024	Best Hip Hop	"Yeah Glo!"	Nominated	
MTV Video Music Awards	2024	MTV Push Performance of the Year	"Lick or Sum"	Nominated	
MTV Video Music Awards	2024	Best Collaboration	"Wanna Be" (with Megan Thee Stallion)	Nominated	
MTV Video Music Awards	2024	Song of Summer	"Wanna Be" (with Megan Thee Stallion)	Nominated	
MTV Video Music Awards	2025	Best Hip Hop	"Whatchu Kno About Me" (with Sexyy Red)	Nominated	
