= Collective Music Group =

American record label founded in 2012

- Parent company: Universal Music Group
- Founded: 2012; 14 years ago
- Founder: Yo Gotti
- Distributor: Interscope
- Genre: Hip hop
- Country of origin: United States
- Location: Memphis, Tennessee

Collective Music Group (formerly Cocaine Muzik Group), also known as CMG the Label, is an American record label founded by rapper Yo Gotti. The label's current president is Yo Gotti's cousin, Brandon Mims. The label houses primarily Memphis-based hip hop artists, including Moneybagg Yo, Blac Youngsta, and GloRilla, as well as 42 Dugg, EST Gee, and Mozzy.

== History ==
In 2012, Yo Gotti launched his own record label after signing to Epic Records. The label was originally named Cocaine Muzik Group based on the "addictiveness of the music released by the label", but decided to change the name after a phone call with 50 Cent who said "they're going to be scared of that." The label's first official release was Yo Gotti's sixth studio album I Am. On May 24, 2014, the label released a collective project featuring the whole roster titled Chapter One, including Wave Chapelle, Zed Zilla, and Snootie Wild.

In 2015, CMG signed Memphis rapper Blac Youngsta following the single "Heavy", in which Yo Gotti appeared on the song's remix. In 2016, CMG signed Memphis rapper Moneybagg Yo. In 2018, the label signed Blocboy JB. In 2019, CMG expanded and signed Detroit rapper 42 Dugg in a joint venture deal with Lil Baby's 4PF. The record label also signed Memphis rapper Big Boogie in 2020.

In January 2021, CMG announced the signing of Louisville rapper EST Gee. On June 3, 2021, Yo Gotti signed a distribution deal with CMG and Interscope Records saying, "we share the same vision about winning – we want to break barriers, disrupt the industry and develop the next generation of superstars. I'm thrilled to partner with them as I continue focusing on CMG's expansion."

On February 10, 2022, CMG launched a press conference announcing the signing of Sacramento rapper Mozzy. In April 2022, CMG signed Jacksonville rapper Lil Poppa. In May 2022, the label signed R&B artist Lehla Samia, becoming the first singer and female artist signed to the label. In July 2022, CMG signed Memphis rapper GloRilla, with Yo Gotti saying she "is a natural born star – she has a different sound and approach that's needed in hip-hop right now".

On July 15, 2022, CMG released their second compilation album titled Gangsta Art.

In 2023, CMG released the compilation Gangsta Art 2 featuring appearances from GloRilla, Moneybagg Yo, Fivio Foreign, and Yo Gotti.

On February 18, 2026, it was announced that rapper Lil Poppa died. He was 25 years old.

== Current roster ==
Act	Year signed
Yo Gotti	2012 (founder)
Blac Youngsta	2015
Moneybagg Yo	2016
BlocBoy JB	2018
42 Dugg	2019
Big Boogie	2020
EST Gee	2021
Mozzy	2022
Lehla Samia	2022
GloRilla	2022

== Former roster ==
Act	Years on label
Lil Poppa	2022–2026

== Discography ==
=== Compilation albums ===
Title	Details	Peak chart positions
Title	Details	US
CMG Presents: Chapter One	Released: May 24, 2014; Label: CMG, Epic; Format: Digital download	—
Gangsta Art	Released: July 15, 2022; Label: CMG, Interscope; Format: Digital download, streaming	11
Gangsta Art 2	Released: September 29, 2023; Label: CMG, Interscope; Format: Digital download, streaming	78

=== Singles ===
Title	Year	Album
"Rocky Road" (CMG the Label with Moneybagg Yo and Kodak Black)	2022	Gangsta Art
"See Wat I'm Sayin" (CMG the Label with Moneybagg Yo)	2022	Gangsta Art
"Big League" (CMG the Label with Yo Gotti, Moneybagg Yo, Mozzy, and Lil Poppa)	2022	Gangsta Art
"Steppers" (CMG the Label with Yo Gotti, Moneybagg Yo, 42 Dugg, EST Gee, Mozzy, and Blac Youngsta)	2022	Gangsta Art
