= Billboard Year-End Hot R&B/Hip-Hop Songs of 2024 =

American music chart

This is a list of Billboard magazine's Top Hot R&B/Hip-Hop Songs of 2024.

No.	Title	Artist(s)
1	"Not Like Us"	Kendrick Lamar
2	"Lovin on Me"	Jack Harlow
3	"Million Dollar Baby"	Tommy Richman
4	"Like That"	Future, Metro Boomin and Kendrick Lamar
5	"Saturn"	SZA
6	"Snooze"	SZA
7	"Agora Hills"	Doja Cat
8	"Paint the Town Red"	Doja Cat
9	"Water"	Tyla
10	"Wanna Be"	GloRilla and Megan Thee Stallion
11	"Redrum"	21 Savage
12	"Carnival"	¥$ (Kanye West and Ty Dolla Sign) featuring Rich the Kid and Playboi Carti
13	"Houdini"	Eminem
14	"Never Lose Me"	Flo Milli
15	"Type Shit"	Future, Metro Boomin, Travis Scott, and Playboi Carti
16	"Rich Baby Daddy"	Drake featuring Sexyy Red and SZA
17	"Yeah Glo!"	GloRilla
18	"Get It Sexyy"	Sexyy Red
19	"First Person Shooter"	Drake featuring J. Cole
20	"Made for Me"	Muni Long
21	"Whatever She Wants"	Bryson Tiller
22	"Euphoria"	Kendrick Lamar
23	"Act II: Date @ 8"	4Batz featuring Drake
24	"Everybody"	Nicki Minaj featuring Lil Uzi Vert
25	"Good Good"	Usher, Summer Walker and 21 Savage
26	"FTCU"	Nicki Minaj
27	"IDGAF"	Drake featuring Yeat
28	"One of Wun"	Gunna
29	"You Broke My Heart"	Drake
30	"Kehlani"	Jordan Adetunji
31	"FukUMean"	Gunna
32	"Band4Band"	Central Cee and Lil Baby
33	"FE!N"	Travis Scott featuring Playboi Carti
34	"TGIF"	GloRilla
35	"On My Mama"	Victoria Monét
36	"Surround Sound"	JID featuring 21 Savage and Baby Tate
37	"Mmhmm"	BigXthaPlug
38	"Get in with Me"	BossMan Dlow
39	"One of the Girls"	The Weeknd, Jennie and Lily-Rose Depp
40	"I Know?"	Travis Scott
41	"Cinderella"	Future, Metro Boomin and Travis Scott
42	"Bandit"	Don Toliver
43	"Prove It"	21 Savage and Summer Walker
44	"Mamushi"	Megan Thee Stallion featuring Yuki Chiba
45	"Soak City (Do It)"	310babii
46	"Enough (Miami)"	Cardi B
47	"500lbs"	Lil Tecca
48	"U My Everything"	Sexyy Red and Drake
49	"Nasty"	Tinashe
50	"Virginia Beach"	Drake
51	"Devil Is a Lie"	Tommy Richman
52	"One Call"	Rich Amiri
53	"Big Dawgs"	Hanumankind and Kalmi
54	"Let's Go"	Key Glock featuring Young Dolph
55	"Push Ups"	Drake
56	"Great Gatsby"	Rod Wave
57	"Family Matters"	Drake
58	"Slime You Out"	Drake featuring SZA
59	"After Hours"	Kehlani
60	"Okay"	JT
61	"Sensational"	Chris Brown featuring Davido and Lojay
62	"Hiss"	Megan Thee Stallion
63	"Help Me"	Real Boston Richey
64	"Worth It"	Offset and Don Toliver
65	"Née-Nah"	21 Savage, Travis Scott, and Metro Boomin
66	"Tell Ur Girlfriend"	Lay Bankz
67	"Parking Lot"	Mustard and Travis Scott
68	"Barbie World"	Nicki Minaj and Ice Spice with Aqua
69	"Mr Pot Scraper"	BossMan Dlow
70	"No Chill"	PartyNextDoor
71	"Turks & Caicos"	Rod Wave featuring 21 Savage
72	"Prada Dem"	Gunna featuring Offset
73	"Breathe"	Yeat
74	"Young Metro"	Future, Metro Boomin and The Weeknd
75	"Talk My Shit"	BossMan Dlow
76	"What It Is (Block Boy)"	Doechii featuring Kodak Black
77	"Shake Dat Ass (Twerk Song)"	BossMan Dlow
78	"Bongos"	Cardi B featuring Megan Thee Stallion
79	"We Don't Trust You"	Future and Metro Boomin
80	"IDGAF"	Tee Grizzley featuring Chris Brown and Mariah the Scientist
81	"Residuals"	Chris Brown
82	"Back on My BS"	BigXthaPlug
83	"Meet the Grahams"	Kendrick Lamar
84	"When It Comes to You"	Fridayy
85	"Meltdown"	Travis Scott featuring Drake
86	"Tobey"	Eminem, Big Sean and BabyTron
87	"Think U the Shit (Fart)"	Ice Spice
88	"Did It First"	Ice Spice and Central Cee
89	"SkeeYee"	Sexyy Red
90	"My Eyes"	Travis Scott
91	"Fuel"	Eminem and JID
92	"Texas"	BigXthaPlug
93	"Timeless"	The Weeknd and Playboi Carti
94	"Call Your Friends"	Rod Wave
95	"It's Up"	Drake featuring 21 Savage and Young Thug
96	"Magic Johnson"	Ian
97	"Big Mama"	Latto
98	"Boyz Don't Cry"	Rod Wave
99	"Burn"	¥$ (Kanye West and Ty Dolla Sign)
100	"Fried (She a Vibe)"	Future and Metro Boomin

== See also ==
- 2024 in music
- Billboard Year-End Hot 100 singles of 2024
- Billboard Year-End Hot Rap Songs of 2024
- List of number-one R&B/hip-hop songs of 2024 (U.S.)
