= Billboard Year-End Hot Rap Songs of 2024 =

American music chart

This is a list of Billboard magazine's Top Hot Rap Songs of 2024.

No.	Title	Artist(s)
1	"Not Like Us"	Kendrick Lamar
2	"Lovin on Me"	Jack Harlow
3	"Like That"	Future, Metro Boomin and Kendrick Lamar
4	"Agora Hills"	Doja Cat
5	"Paint the Town Red"	Doja Cat
6	"Wanna Be"	GloRilla and Megan Thee Stallion
7	"Redrum"	21 Savage
8	"Carnival"	¥$ (Kanye West and Ty Dolla Sign) featuring Rich the Kid and Playboi Carti
9	"Houdini"	Eminem
10	"Never Lose Me"	Flo Milli
11	"Rich Baby Daddy"	Drake featuring Sexyy Red and SZA
12	"Type Shit"	Future, Metro Boomin, Travis Scott, and Playboi Carti
13	"Get It Sexyy"	Sexyy Red
14	"Yeah Glo!"	GloRilla
15	"Lil Boo Thang"	Paul Russell
16	"First Person Shooter"	Drake featuring J. Cole
17	"Whatever She Wants"	Bryson Tiller
18	"Euphoria"	Kendrick Lamar
19	"Everybody"	Nicki Minaj featuring Lil Uzi Vert
20	"One of Wun"	Gunna
21	"IDGAF"	Drake featuring Yeat
22	"FTCU"	Nicki Minaj
23	"FukUMean"	Gunna
24	"Kehlani"	Jordan Adetunji
25	"TGIF"	GloRilla
26	"Whiskey Whiskey"	Moneybagg Yo featuring Morgan Wallen
27	"Band4Band"	Central Cee and Lil Baby
28	"Surround Sound"	JID featuring 21 Savage and Baby Tate
29	"You Broke My Heart"	Drake
30	"I Know?"	Travis Scott
31	"Get in with Me"	BossMan Dlow
32	"FE!N"	Travis Scott
33	"Mamushi"	Megan Thee Stallion featuring Yuki Chiba
34	"500lbs"	Lil Tecca
35	"Enough (Miami)"	Cardi B
36	"Big Dawgs"	Hanumankind and Kalmi
37	"U My Everything"	Sexyy Red and Drake
38	"Soak City (Do It)"	310babii
39	"Mmhmm"	BigXthaPlug
40	"Bandit"	Don Toliver
41	"Cinderella"	Future, Metro Boomin and Travis Scott
42	"Virginia Beach"	Drake
43	"Push Ups"	Drake
44	"Help Me"	Real Boston Richey
45	"Family Matters"	Drake
46	"Barbie World"	Nicki Minaj and Ice Spice with Aqua
47	"Great Gatsby"	Rod Wave
48	"Née-Nah"	21 Savage, Travis Scott, and Metro Boomin
49	"Hiss"	Megan Thee Stallion
50	"Prove It"	21 Savage and Summer Walker

== See also ==
- 2024 in music
- Billboard Year-End Hot 100 singles of 2024
- Billboard Year-End Hot R&B/Hip-Hop Songs of 2024
