= Billboard Year-End Hot 100 singles of 2024 =

Ranking of recorded music

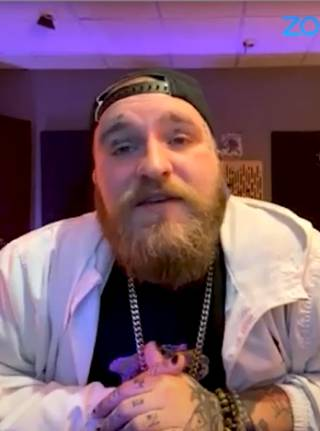
"Lose Control" by Teddy Swims ranked at number one on the Year-End list after spending a week atop the weekly Hot 100 chart in March.

The Billboard Hot 100 is a chart that ranks the best-performing singles of the United States. Its data, published by Billboard magazine and compiled by Nielsen SoundScan, is based collectively on each single's weekly physical and digital sales, as well as airplay and streaming. At the end of a year, Billboard will publish an annual list of the 100 most successful songs throughout that year on the Hot 100 chart based on the information. For 2024, the list was published on December 13, calculated with data from October 28, 2023, to October 19, 2024.

== Year-end list ==
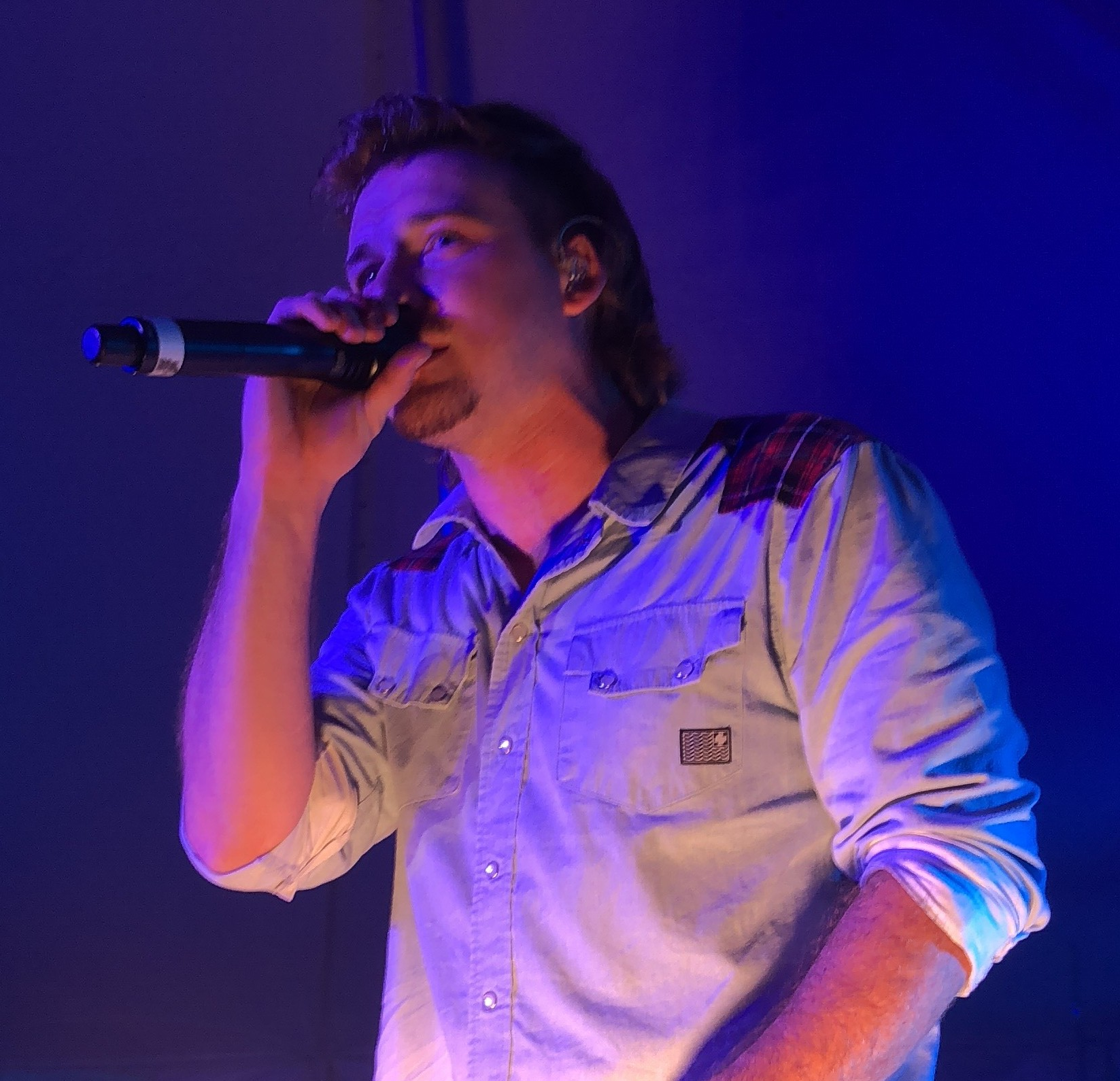
Morgan Wallen had five songs within the top 50, with "I Had Some Help" (Post Malone featuring Morgan Wallen) at number 4, "Last Night" at number 28, "Cowgirls" (featuring Ernest) at number 29, "Thinkin' Bout Me" at number 31, and "Lies Lies Lies" at number 50.

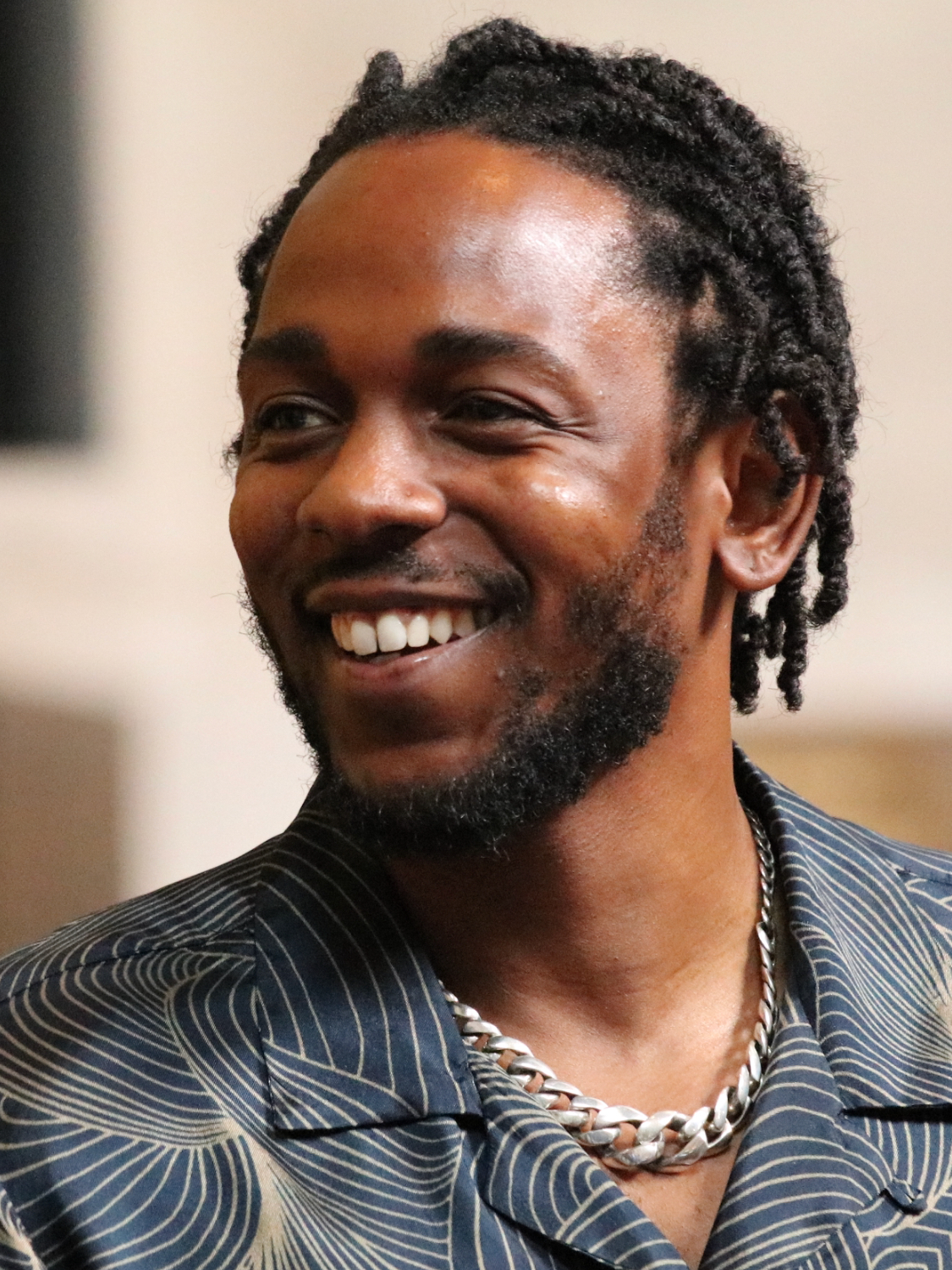
Three of Kendrick Lamar's diss tracks aimed at Drake made it on the Year-End list, with "Not Like Us" at number 6, "Like That" (Future, Metro Boomin and Kendrick Lamar) at number 14, and "Euphoria" at number 66.

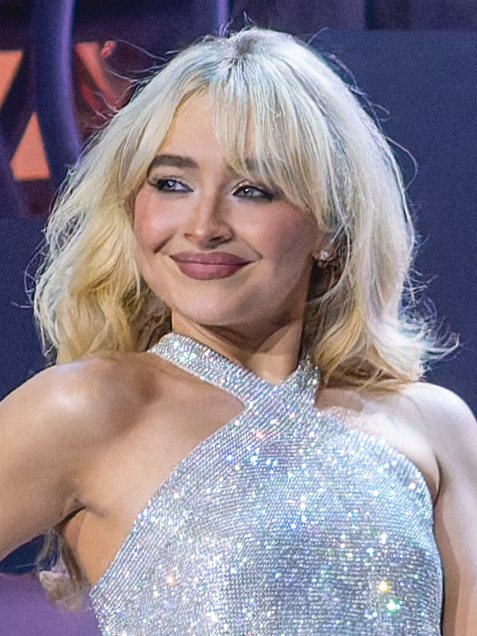
Four of Sabrina Carpenter's songs entered the list, with "Espresso" at number 7, "Please Please Please" at number 16, "Feather" at number 25, and "Taste" at number 86.

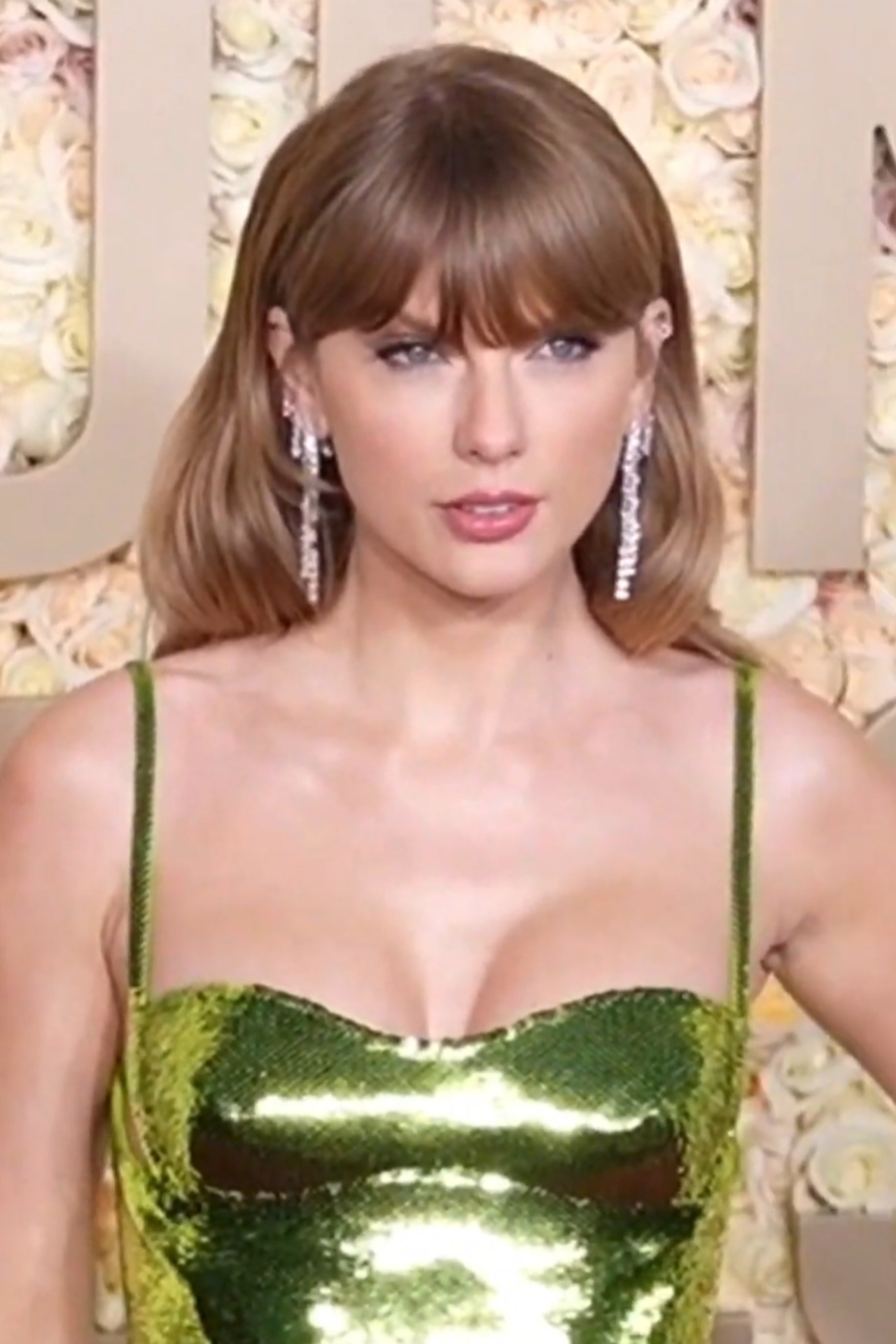
Taylor Swift notched five entries on the list, with "Cruel Summer" at number 12, "Fortnight" (featuring Post Malone) at number 22, "Is It Over Now?" at number 33, "I Can Do It with a Broken Heart" at number 35, and "Down Bad" at number 99.

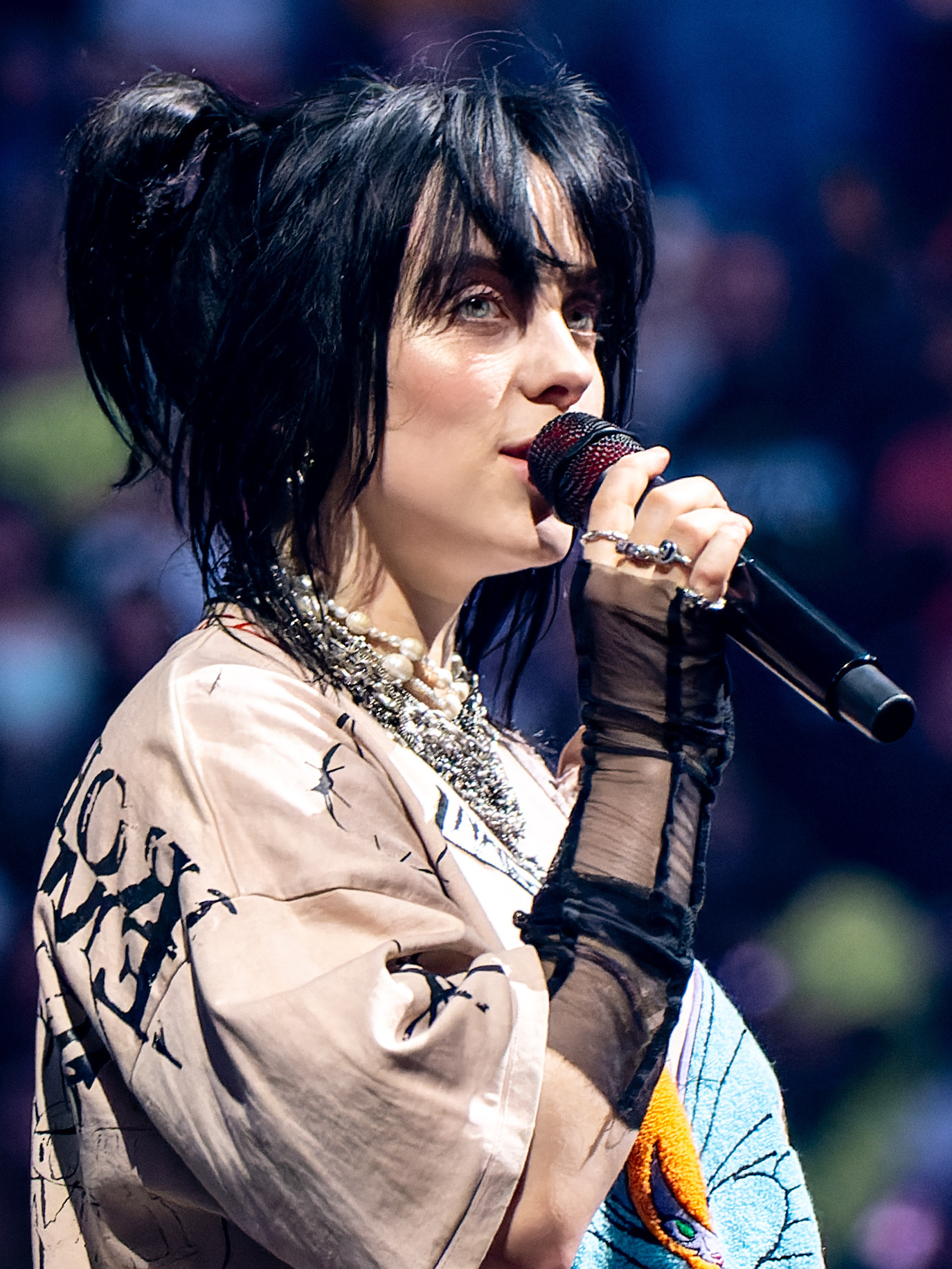
Billie Eilish placed four songs within the Year-End, three of which came from her third studio album Hit Me Hard and Soft as "Birds of a Feather" ranks at number 15, "Lunch" ranks at number 48, and "Wildflower" ranks at number 89.

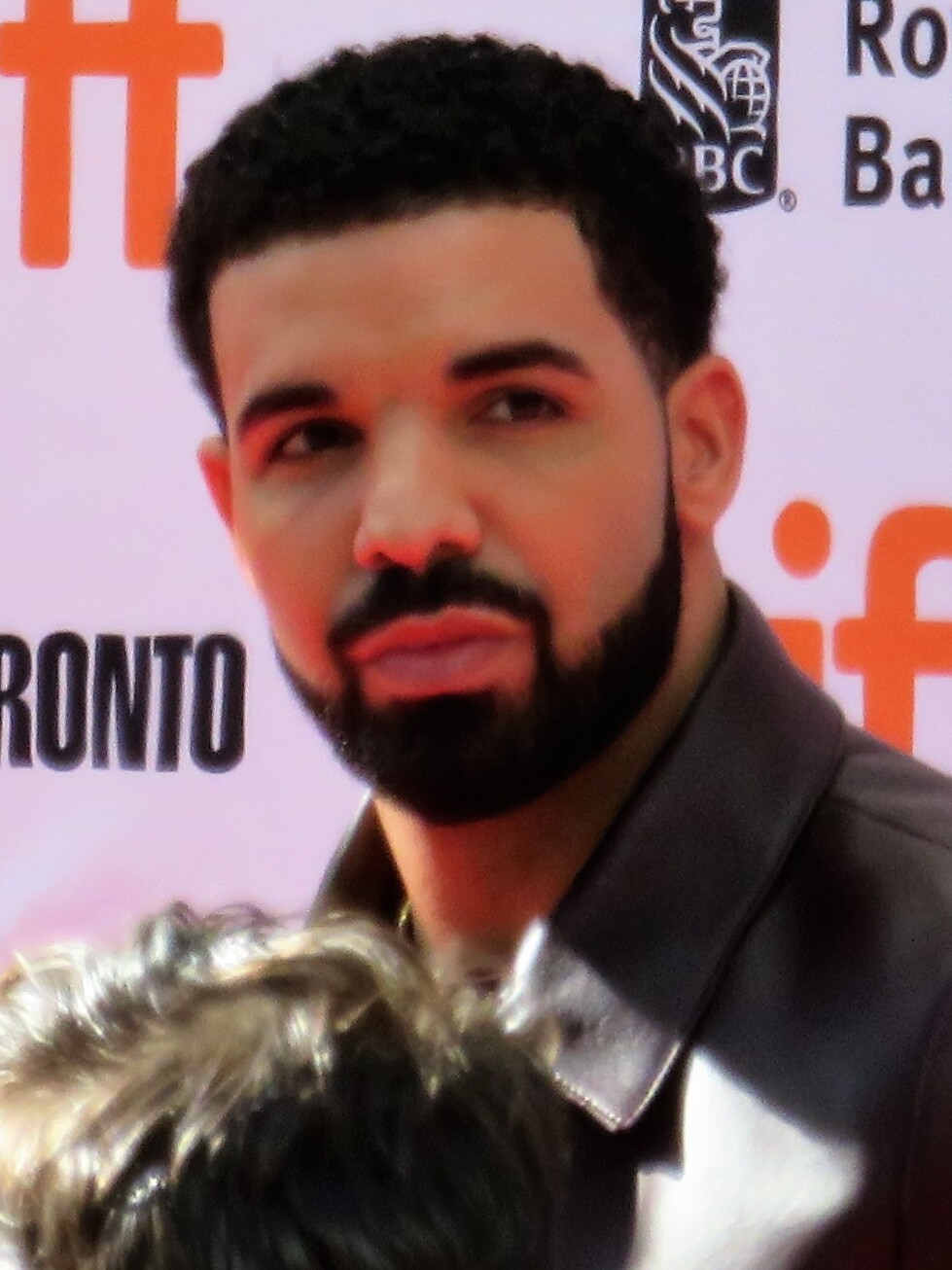
Drake had four entries on the Year-End, with "Rich Baby Daddy" (featuring Sexyy Red and SZA) at number 45, "First Person Shooter" (featuring J. Cole) at number 61, "Act II: Date @ 8" (4Batz and Drake) at number 80, and "IDGAF" (featuring Yeat) at number 83.

List of songs on Billboard's 2024 Year-End Hot 100 chart
No.	Title	Artist(s)
1	"Lose Control"	Teddy Swims
2	"A Bar Song (Tipsy)"	Shaboozey
3	"Beautiful Things"	Benson Boone
4	"I Had Some Help"	Post Malone featuring Morgan Wallen
5	"Lovin on Me"	Jack Harlow
6	"Not Like Us"	Kendrick Lamar
7	"Espresso"	Sabrina Carpenter
8	"Million Dollar Baby"	Tommy Richman
9	"I Remember Everything"	Zach Bryan featuring Kacey Musgraves
10	"Too Sweet"	Hozier
11	"Stick Season"	Noah Kahan
12	"Cruel Summer"	Taylor Swift
13	"Greedy"	Tate McRae
14	"Like That"	Future, Metro Boomin and Kendrick Lamar
15	"Birds of a Feather"	Billie Eilish
16	"Please Please Please"	Sabrina Carpenter
17	"Agora Hills"	Doja Cat
18	"Good Luck, Babe!"	Chappell Roan
19	"Saturn"	SZA
20	"Snooze"	SZA
21	"Paint the Town Red"	Doja Cat
22	"Fortnight"	Taylor Swift featuring Post Malone
23	"Fast Car"	Luke Combs
24	"Water"	Tyla
25	"Feather"	Sabrina Carpenter
26	"We Can't Be Friends (Wait for Your Love)"	Ariana Grande
27	"Austin"	Dasha
28	"Last Night"	Morgan Wallen
29	"Cowgirls"	Morgan Wallen featuring Ernest
30	"Pink Skies"	Zach Bryan
31	"Thinkin' Bout Me"	Morgan Wallen
32	"Texas Hold 'Em"	Beyoncé
33	"Is It Over Now?"	Taylor Swift
34	"Miles on It"	Marshmello and Kane Brown
35	"I Can Do It with a Broken Heart"	Taylor Swift
36	"Wild Ones"	Jessie Murph and Jelly Roll
37	"Ain't No Love in Oklahoma"	Luke Combs
38	"Carnival"	¥$ (Kanye West and Ty Dolla Sign) featuring Rich the Kid and Playboi Carti
39	"Houdini"	Eminem
40	"Wanna Be"	GloRilla and Megan Thee Stallion
41	"Slow It Down"	Benson Boone
42	"Redrum"	21 Savage
43	"Houdini"	Dua Lipa
44	"Yeah Glo!"	GloRilla
45	"Rich Baby Daddy"	Drake featuring Sexyy Red and SZA
46	"What Was I Made For?"	Billie Eilish
47	"End of Beginning"	Djo
48	"Lunch"	Billie Eilish
49	"Never Lose Me"	Flo Milli
50	"Lies Lies Lies"	Morgan Wallen
51	"Type Shit"	Future, Metro Boomin, Travis Scott, and Playboi Carti
52	"Gata Only"	FloyyMenor and Cris MJ
53	"Hot to Go!"	Chappell Roan
54	"All I Want for Christmas Is You"	Mariah Carey
55	"Get It Sexyy"	Sexyy Red
56	"Made for Me"	Muni Long
57	"Vampire"	Olivia Rodrigo
58	"Whatever She Wants"	Bryson Tiller
59	"Rockin' Around the Christmas Tree"	Brenda Lee
60	"Pretty Little Poison"	Warren Zeiders
61	"First Person Shooter"	Drake featuring J. Cole
62	"Die with a Smile"	Lady Gaga and Bruno Mars
63	"I Like the Way You Kiss Me"	Artemas
64	"Need a Favor"	Jelly Roll
65	"Save Me"	Jelly Roll featuring Lainey Wilson
66	"Euphoria"	Kendrick Lamar
67	"Truck Bed"	Hardy
68	"Jingle Bell Rock"	Bobby Helms
69	"Flowers"	Miley Cyrus
70	"Where the Wild Things Are"	Luke Combs
71	"Everybody"	Nicki Minaj featuring Lil Uzi Vert
72	"La Diabla"	Xavi
73	"Stargazing"	Myles Smith
74	"Last Christmas"	Wham!
75	"I Am Not Okay"	Jelly Roll
76	"Pour Me a Drink"	Post Malone featuring Blake Shelton
77	"White Horse"	Chris Stapleton
78	"Lil Boo Thang"	Paul Russell
79	"Good Good"	Usher, Summer Walker and 21 Savage
80	"Act II: Date @ 8"	4Batz and Drake
81	"High Road"	Koe Wetzel featuring Jessie Murph
82	"Monaco"	Bad Bunny
83	"IDGAF"	Drake featuring Yeat
84	"Burn It Down"	Parker McCollum
85	"FukUMean"	Gunna
86	"Taste"	Sabrina Carpenter
87	"Where It Ends"	Bailey Zimmerman
88	"FTCU"	Nicki Minaj
89	"Wildflower"	Billie Eilish
90	"World on Fire"	Nate Smith
91	"On My Mama"	Victoria Monét
92	"Yes, And?"	Ariana Grande
93	"Exes"	Tate McRae
94	"A Holly Jolly Christmas"	Burl Ives
95	"Wind Up Missin' You"	Tucker Wetmore
96	"Bulletproof"	Nate Smith
97	"Fe!n"	Travis Scott featuring Playboi Carti
98	"The Painter"	Cody Johnson
99	"Down Bad"	Taylor Swift
100	"Dance the Night"	Dua Lipa

== See also ==
- 2024 in American music
- Billboard Year-End Hot R&B/Hip-Hop Songs of 2024
- Billboard Year-End Hot Rap Songs of 2024
- List of Billboard Hot 100 number ones of 2024
- List of Billboard Hot 100 top-ten singles in 2024
