= Dlow Curry =

2024 album by BossMan Dlow

Studio album by BossMan Dlow
- Released: December 13, 2024
- Genre: Southern hip-hop; trap
- Length: 49:13
- Label: Alamo
- Producer: Audio Jacc; Ayo P8; Blunote; Chapaveli; Chasethemoney; Dub; D.A. Got That Dope; DZY; Gentle Beatz; Hardknock; Keyman; King Nathan; Lako; Lorenz Don't Stop; LuhRonMadeDis; MaddMix; Marko Lenz; Natra Average; Saidon; Schife; Stevewoahhh; Tapekid; TNTXD; Uno Reyes; Yakree; Zwerga

BossMan Dlow chronology
Mr Beat the Road (2024)	Dlow Curry (2024)	Chicken Talkin Bastard (2026)

Deluxe edition cover art

Singles from Dlow Curry
- 1. "PJ" Released: July 10, 2024; 2. "The Biggest Pt. 2" Released: November 22, 2024; 3. "Dlow Curry" Released: December 6, 2024; 4. "What You Need" Released: December 6, 2024

Singles from Dlow Curry (Deluxe)
- 1. "Sum Out of Nun" Released: February 27, 2025; 2. "Money Talks" Released: April 4, 2025; 3. "Hit" Released: May 16, 2025

Dlow Curry is the debut studio album by American rapper BossMan Dlow, released on December 13, 2024, by Alamo Records. It features guest appearances from Babyface Ray, French Montana, GloRilla, Ice Spice, Lil Baby, and NoCap. It was supported by the singles "PJ", "The Biggest Pt. 2", "Dlow Curry", and "What You Need". The album peaked at number 36 on the US Billboard 200. A deluxe edition of the album was released on May 23, 2025, with eight additional tracks, including a guest appearance from Gucci Mane.

== Background and promotion ==
The album was announced through ESPN's SportsCenter on December 7, 2024. A longtime fan of the network, Dlow utilized SportsCenter as a platform for his album reveal, incorporating a staged breaking news segment filmed at the network's studio. The announcement comes after the release of a single of the same name, "SportsCenter", released in June 2024. Dlow took to social media to highlight the significance of his announcement, stating:

FIRST RAPPER EVER TO ANNOUNCE THEIR ALBUM ON SPORTSCENTER ‼️😤😤

Dlow's association with the television network dates back to August 2024, when ESPN featured his music during a college football broadcast. During the August 29 game between the Colorado Buffaloes and North Dakota State, sportscaster Mark Jones referenced lyrics from Dlow's song "PJ". Following the broadcast, Dlow responded on social media by calling for an opportunity to appear on SportsCenter, tweeting:

PUT BIG ZA ON SPORTSCENTER ‼️😂🦈

The album's track listing was revealed via Dlow's social media on December 11, 2024.

== Critical reception ==
Professional ratings
Review scores
Source	Rating
Pitchfork	7.4/10
RapReviews	6/10

Dlow Curry received generally positive reviews from critics. Paul Thompson of Pitchfork praised the album for its high-energy, fast-paced structure that he felt perfectly complemented Bossman Dlow's "expressive" and "charismatic" style. He wrote, "Though stuffed with outlandish boasts and nonstop hustle, the Port Salerno rapper's new album is remarkably light on its feet." RapReviews was more mixed, however, praising BossMan Dlow's unique vocal style and success while criticizing the album's repetitive themes and production.

== Track listing ==
Dlow Curry track listing
No.	Title	Writer(s)	Producer(s)	Length
1.	"Dlow Curry"	Devante McCreary; D'Andre Ferby	LuhRunMadeDis	2:05
2.	"Like Dat"	McCreary; David Doman	D.A. Got That Dope	2:04
3.	"Pillsbury Dlow" (featuring Ice Spice)	McCreary; Eli Haire; Isis Gaston; Olalekan Akinyokunbo; Patrick Parker; Stephen McInnis	Blunote; Lako; Stevewoahhh; Uno Reyes	2:55
4.	"Mo Chicken" (featuring French Montana)	McCreary; Ian Chow; Karim Kharbouch	Ayo P8; X9beatz	3:00
5.	"The Biggest Pt. 2"	McCreary; Bortnyi Lavrentii	Lorenz Don't Stop	2:32
6.	"46th Street"	McCreary; Daniel Schnabel	Gentle Beatz	2:02
7.	"Star Life"	McCreary; Nathan Silfain; Zmerha Yuriy	King Nathan; Zwerga	2:02
8.	"Cash Shit"	McCreary; Jack Cohen-Mugan; Jack Thierer; Levin Buhtz	Audio Jacc; Tapekid; Yakree	1:51
9.	"Game Winner"	McCreary; Chase Rose; Donald Wayne Williams III	Chapaveli; Chasethemoney	2:07
10.	"Big"	McCreary; Anthony Howard; Dion Davenport; Buhtz	DZY; MaddMix; Tapekid	2:16
11.	"Motion"	McCreary; Silfain; Yuriy	King Nathan; Zwerega	2:00
12.	"PJ" (featuring Lil Baby)	McCreary; Saniel Schnabel; Dominique Jones	Gentle Beatz	2:58
13.	"Out the Mud"	McCreary; Silfain; Saidon Richardson	King Nathan; Saidon	2:14
14.	"What You Need" (featuring NoCap)	McCreary; Ferby; Kobe Crawford	LuhRonMadeDis	3:18
15.	"Pushin Up"	McCreary; Silfain	King Nathan	2:06
16.	"Dlow Flintstone"	McCreary; Davenport; Djimitry Larochelle; Ian Lewis; Mark Nikolaev	Marko Lenz; Schife	1:50
17.	"Dlow Gucci"	McCreary; Christopher Gibbs; Davenport	Dub; Natra Average	1:51
18.	"Boxing Night" (featuring Babyface Ray)	McCreary; Hunter Sallis; Marcellus Register; Thomas Horton	Keyman; TnTXD	3:31
19.	"For Days"	McCreary; Haire; Akinyokunbo	Lako; Uno Reyes	2:41
20.	"Shake Dat Ass (Twerk Song)" (remix; featuring GloRilla)	McCreary; Gloria Woods; Victor Lasilla	Hardknock	3:50
Total length:				49:13

Dlow Curry deluxe track listing
No.	Title	Writer(s)	Producer(s)	Length
21.	"Up"	McCreary; Lassila	Hardknock	2:23
22.	"Hit" (featuring Gucci Mane)	McCreary; Radric Davis; Thierer	Yakree	2:55
23.	"Money Talks"	McCreary; Davenport; Elias Reitzfeld; Morrison Kraft	448 Millionaire; Dub; EliWTF	1:47
24.	"Sum Out of Nun"	McCreary; Kameron Wolfel; DonJuan1k; Tahj Vaughn	KamDoubleGz; DonJuan1k; Tahj Money	2:08
25.	"Plenty Motion"	McCreary; Tyron Douglas	Buddah Bless	1:55
26.	"Dogshit Talker"	McCreary; Milan Modi	Yung Lan	1:52
27.	"Get Stretched"	McCreary; Schnabel	Gentle Beatz	1:48
28.	"Za Plates"	McCreary; Jeffrey Jones	Foreverolling	1:42
Total length:				65:45

== Charts ==
=== Weekly charts ===
Weekly chart performance for Dlow Curry
Chart (2024–2025)	Peak position
US Billboard 200	36
US Top R&B/Hip-Hop Albums (Billboard)	9

=== Year-end charts ===
Year-end chart performance for Dlow Curry
Chart (2025)	Position
US Top R&B/Hip-Hop Albums (Billboard)	73
