= List of Billboard Hot R&B/Hip-Hop Songs number ones of 2024 =

This page lists the songs that reached number one on the overall Billboard Hot R&B/Hip-Hop Songs, Hot R&B Songs, Hot Rap Songs and R&B/Hip-Hop Airplay charts in 2024. The R&B Songs and Rap Songs charts partly serve as respective distillations of the overall R&B/Hip-Hop Songs chart, apart from the R&B/Hip-Hop Airplay chart which serve as a forefront for radio and video airplay counts.

== Chart history ==
Key
†	Indicates best-performing song of 2024

Issue date	Hot R&B/Hip-Hop Songs	Artist(s)	Hot R&B Songs	Artist(s)	Hot Rap Songs	Artist(s)	R&B/Hip-Hop Airplay	Artist(s)	Ref.
January 6	"Lovin on Me"	Jack Harlow	"Snooze"	SZA	"Lovin on Me"	Jack Harlow	"Snooze" †	SZA	
January 13	"Lovin on Me"	Jack Harlow	"Snooze"	SZA	"Lovin on Me"	Jack Harlow	"Snooze" †	SZA	
January 20	"Lovin on Me"	Jack Harlow	"Snooze"	SZA	"Lovin on Me"	Jack Harlow	"Snooze" †	SZA	
January 27	"Lovin on Me"	Jack Harlow	"Snooze"	SZA	"Lovin on Me"	Jack Harlow	"Snooze" †	SZA	
February 3	"Lovin on Me"	Jack Harlow	"Snooze"	SZA	"Lovin on Me"	Jack Harlow	"Snooze" †	SZA	
February 10	"Hiss"	Megan Thee Stallion	"Snooze"	SZA	"Hiss"	Megan Thee Stallion	"Snooze" †	SZA	
February 17	"Lovin on Me"	Jack Harlow	"Snooze"	SZA	"Lovin on Me"	Jack Harlow	"Snooze" †	SZA	
February 24	"Lovin on Me"	Jack Harlow	"Snooze"	SZA	"Lovin on Me"	Jack Harlow	"Snooze" †	SZA	
March 2	"Lovin on Me"	Jack Harlow	"Snooze"	SZA	"Lovin on Me"	Jack Harlow	"Snooze" †	SZA	
March 9	"Carnival"	¥$: Ye and Ty Dolla Sign featuring Rich the Kid and Playboi Carti	"Saturn"	SZA	"Carnival"	¥$: Ye and Ty Dolla Sign featuring Rich the Kid and Playboi Carti	"Snooze" †	SZA	
March 16	"Carnival"	¥$: Ye and Ty Dolla Sign featuring Rich the Kid and Playboi Carti	"Snooze"	SZA	"Carnival"	¥$: Ye and Ty Dolla Sign featuring Rich the Kid and Playboi Carti	"Snooze" †	SZA	
March 23	"Carnival"	¥$: Ye and Ty Dolla Sign featuring Rich the Kid and Playboi Carti	"Act II: Date @ 8"	4Batz featuring Drake	"Carnival"	¥$: Ye and Ty Dolla Sign featuring Rich the Kid and Playboi Carti	"Snooze" †	SZA	
March 30	"Lovin on Me"	Jack Harlow	"Snooze"	SZA	"Lovin on Me"	Jack Harlow	"Snooze" †	SZA	
April 6	"Like That"	Future, Metro Boomin and Kendrick Lamar	"Water"	Tyla	"Like That"	Future, Metro Boomin and Kendrick Lamar	"Made for Me"	Muni Long	
April 13	"Like That"	Future, Metro Boomin and Kendrick Lamar	"Saturn"	SZA	"Like That"	Future, Metro Boomin and Kendrick Lamar	"Made for Me"	Muni Long	
April 20	"Like That"	Future, Metro Boomin and Kendrick Lamar	"Saturn"	SZA	"Like That"	Future, Metro Boomin and Kendrick Lamar	"Made for Me"	Muni Long	
April 27	"Like That"	Future, Metro Boomin and Kendrick Lamar	"Saturn"	SZA	"Like That"	Future, Metro Boomin and Kendrick Lamar	"Made for Me"	Muni Long	
May 4	"Like That"	Future, Metro Boomin and Kendrick Lamar	"Saturn"	SZA	"Like That"	Future, Metro Boomin and Kendrick Lamar	"Made for Me"	Muni Long	
May 11	"Million Dollar Baby"	Tommy Richman	"Million Dollar Baby" †	Tommy Richman	"Like That"	Future, Metro Boomin and Kendrick Lamar	"Made for Me"	Muni Long	
May 18	"Not Like Us" †	Kendrick Lamar	"Million Dollar Baby" †	Tommy Richman	"Not Like Us" †	Kendrick Lamar	"Made for Me"	Muni Long	
May 25	"Not Like Us" †	Kendrick Lamar	"Million Dollar Baby" †	Tommy Richman	"Not Like Us" †	Kendrick Lamar	"Snooze" †	SZA	
June 1	"Not Like Us" †	Kendrick Lamar	"Million Dollar Baby" †	Tommy Richman	"Not Like Us" †	Kendrick Lamar	"Like That"	Future, Metro Boomin and Kendrick Lamar	
June 8	"Not Like Us" †	Kendrick Lamar	"Million Dollar Baby" †	Tommy Richman	"Not Like Us" †	Kendrick Lamar	"Like That"	Future, Metro Boomin and Kendrick Lamar	
June 15	"Houdini"	Eminem	"Million Dollar Baby" †	Tommy Richman	"Houdini"	Eminem	"Like That"	Future, Metro Boomin and Kendrick Lamar	
June 22	"Million Dollar Baby"	Tommy Richman	"Million Dollar Baby" †	Tommy Richman	"Not Like Us" †	Kendrick Lamar	"Not Like Us"	Kendrick Lamar	
June 29	"Million Dollar Baby"	Tommy Richman	"Million Dollar Baby" †	Tommy Richman	"Not Like Us" †	Kendrick Lamar	"Not Like Us"	Kendrick Lamar	
July 6	"Not Like Us" †	Kendrick Lamar	"Million Dollar Baby" †	Tommy Richman	"Not Like Us" †	Kendrick Lamar	"Not Like Us"	Kendrick Lamar	
July 13	"Not Like Us" †	Kendrick Lamar	"Million Dollar Baby" †	Tommy Richman	"Not Like Us" †	Kendrick Lamar	"Not Like Us"	Kendrick Lamar	
July 20	"Not Like Us" †	Kendrick Lamar	"Million Dollar Baby" †	Tommy Richman	"Not Like Us" †	Kendrick Lamar	"Not Like Us"	Kendrick Lamar	
July 27	"Not Like Us" †	Kendrick Lamar	"Million Dollar Baby" †	Tommy Richman	"Not Like Us" †	Kendrick Lamar	"Not Like Us"	Kendrick Lamar	
August 3	"Not Like Us" †	Kendrick Lamar	"Million Dollar Baby" †	Tommy Richman	"Not Like Us" †	Kendrick Lamar	"Not Like Us"	Kendrick Lamar	
August 10	"Not Like Us" †	Kendrick Lamar	"Million Dollar Baby" †	Tommy Richman	"Not Like Us" †	Kendrick Lamar	"Not Like Us"	Kendrick Lamar	
August 17	"Not Like Us" †	Kendrick Lamar	"Million Dollar Baby" †	Tommy Richman	"Not Like Us" †	Kendrick Lamar	"Not Like Us"	Kendrick Lamar	
August 24	"Not Like Us" †	Kendrick Lamar	"Million Dollar Baby" †	Tommy Richman	"Not Like Us" †	Kendrick Lamar	"Not Like Us"	Kendrick Lamar	
August 31	"Not Like Us" †	Kendrick Lamar	"Million Dollar Baby" †	Tommy Richman	"Not Like Us" †	Kendrick Lamar	"Not Like Us"	Kendrick Lamar	
September 7	"Not Like Us" †	Kendrick Lamar	"Million Dollar Baby" †	Tommy Richman	"Not Like Us" †	Kendrick Lamar	"Not Like Us"	Kendrick Lamar	
September 14	"Not Like Us" †	Kendrick Lamar	"Million Dollar Baby" †	Tommy Richman	"Not Like Us" †	Kendrick Lamar	"Not Like Us"	Kendrick Lamar	
September 21	"Not Like Us" †	Kendrick Lamar	"Million Dollar Baby" †	Tommy Richman	"Not Like Us" †	Kendrick Lamar	"Not Like Us"	Kendrick Lamar	
September 28	"Not Like Us" †	Kendrick Lamar	"Million Dollar Baby" †	Tommy Richman	"Not Like Us" †	Kendrick Lamar	"Not Like Us"	Kendrick Lamar	
October 5	"Not Like Us" †	Kendrick Lamar	"Million Dollar Baby" †	Tommy Richman	"Not Like Us" †	Kendrick Lamar	"TGIF"	GloRilla	
October 12	"Timeless"	The Weeknd and Playboi Carti	"Timeless"	The Weeknd and Playboi Carti	"Not Like Us" †	Kendrick Lamar	"TGIF"	GloRilla	
October 19	"Not Like Us" †	Kendrick Lamar	"Timeless"	The Weeknd and Playboi Carti	"Not Like Us" †	Kendrick Lamar	"TGIF"	GloRilla	
October 26	"Not Like Us" †	Kendrick Lamar	"Timeless"	The Weeknd and Playboi Carti	"Not Like Us" †	Kendrick Lamar	"TGIF"	GloRilla	
November 2	"Not Like Us" †	Kendrick Lamar	"Timeless"	The Weeknd and Playboi Carti	"Not Like Us" †	Kendrick Lamar	"TGIF"	GloRilla	
November 9	"St. Chroma"	Tyler, the Creator featuring Daniel Caesar	"Thriller"	Michael Jackson	"St. Chroma"	Tyler, the Creator featuring Daniel Caesar	"TGIF"	GloRilla	
November 16	"Sticky"	Tyler, the Creator featuring GloRilla, Sexyy Red and Lil Wayne	"Timeless"	The Weeknd and Playboi Carti	"Sticky"	Tyler, the Creator featuring GloRilla, Sexyy Red and Lil Wayne	"TGIF"	GloRilla	
November 23	"Timeless"	The Weeknd and Playboi Carti	"Timeless"	The Weeknd and Playboi Carti	"Not Like Us" †	Kendrick Lamar	"TGIF"	GloRilla	
November 30	"Sticky"	Tyler, the Creator featuring GloRilla, Sexyy Red and Lil Wayne	"Timeless"	The Weeknd and Playboi Carti	"Sticky"	Tyler, the Creator featuring GloRilla, Sexyy Red and Lil Wayne	"TGIF"	GloRilla	
December 7	"Squabble Up"	Kendrick Lamar	"Timeless"	The Weeknd and Playboi Carti	"Squabble Up"	Kendrick Lamar	"TGIF"	GloRilla	
December 14	"TV Off"	Kendrick Lamar featuring Lefty Gunplay	"Timeless"	The Weeknd and Playboi Carti	"TV Off"	Kendrick Lamar featuring Lefty Gunplay	"TGIF"	GloRilla	
December 21	"Luther"	Kendrick Lamar and SZA	"Timeless"	The Weeknd and Playboi Carti	"Luther"	Kendrick Lamar and SZA	"TGIF"	GloRilla	
December 28	"Luther"	Kendrick Lamar and SZA	"Timeless"	The Weeknd and Playboi Carti	"Luther"	Kendrick Lamar and SZA	"TGIF"	GloRilla	

== See also ==
- 2024 in American music
- 2024 in hip hop music
- Billboard Year-End Hot R&B/Hip-Hop Songs of 2024
- List of Billboard Hot 100 number ones of 2024
- List of Billboard number-one R&B/hip-hop albums of 2024
