= Kehlani (disambiguation) =

Kehlani (born 1995) is an American singer-songwriter and dancer.

Kehlani may also refer to:

- Kehlani (album), their eponymous album, 2026
- "Kehlani" (song), by Jordan Adetunji, 2024
