= Motion Party =

2026 single by BossMan Dlow

Single by BossMan Dlow

from the album Chicken Talkin Bastard
- B-side: "Let's Go Get Em"
- Released: March 13, 2026
- Genre: Hip-hop; trap
- Length: 1:35
- Label: Alamo; Sony
- Songwriters: Devante McCreary; Tyreece Faison; Dion Davenport; Darryon Bunton; Evan Huang; Khia Chambers; Edward Merriwether; Michael Williams
- Producers: Gitt Fai; Prod DB; K6WYA

BossMan Dlow singles chronology
"Act Like Money" (2026)	"Motion Party" (2026)	"Nothin Like Me" (2026)

Music video
- "Motion Party" on YouTube

"Motion Party" is a song by American rapper BossMan Dlow, released on March 13, 2026, alongside his song "Let's Go Get Em" as part of a two-track single of the same name. It serves as the sixth single to his second studio album, Chicken Talkin Bastard (2026). The song finds BossMan Dlow boasting his wealth, status and extravagant lifestyle, while playfully addressing women and haters.

== Release and promotion ==
On January 28, 2026, BossMan Dlow's manager Tymeout posted the song as an unofficial audio on the video-sharing app TikTok. On February 26, TikTok user @mrflawdaaa posted a clip of a new dance challenge set to a snippet of "Motion Party", having previously also started a viral dance to Dlow's "Shake Dat Ass (Twerk Song)". as a result, the song was used in tens of thousands of TikTok videos before being released on March 13. @mrflawdaaa also went on to make a cameo in the song's music video, which premiered on March 12. By the beginning of April 2026, the song became played in over 218,000 TikTok clips and 31,000 Instagram Reels.

== Critical reception ==
Tallie Spencer of HotNewHipHop stated that the song "capture[s] the same charismatic energy that helped push Dlow to viral success, reinforcing his reputation for delivering catchy, high-energy street anthems." Sharmaine Johnson of BET wrote "When Bossman gets into his flow state, he always cooks up a hit. 'Motion Party' is the one you're going to want to add to your pregame and party playlist for sure."

== Commercial performance ==
According to Luminate, the song reached 7.79 million official on-demand streams within the first week of its release. The figure increased by 8.6% in the following week (March 20–26) to 8.46 million streams.

== Remix ==
An official remix of the song was released on May 29, 2026. It features American rapper Megan Thee Stallion, who takes a shot at her ex-boyfriend, basketball player Klay Thompson, for cheating on her. Alexander Cole of HotNewHipHop praised the remix, commenting that it "contains all of the charm of the original song, although this time, we also get a nice verse from Megan Thee Stallion." Kiana Fitzgerald of Consequence also responded positively to Megan Thee Stallion's performance.

== Charts ==
Chart performance for "Motion Party"
Chart (2026)	Peak position
US Billboard Hot 100	37
US Hot R&B/Hip-Hop Songs (Billboard)	9
US Rhythmic Airplay (Billboard)	1
