= List of Irish Grammy Award winners and nominees =

The following is a list of Grammy Award winners and nominees from Ireland.

Year	Nominees(s)	Nominated for	Category	Result
1988	U2	"I Still Haven't Found What I'm Looking For"	Record of the Year	Nominated
1988	U2	"I Still Haven't Found What I'm Looking For"	Song of the Year	Nominated
1988	U2	The Joshua Tree	Album of the Year	Won
1988	U2	The Joshua Tree	Best Rock Performance by a Duo or Group with Vocal	Won
1989	U2	"Desire"	Best Rock Performance by a Duo or Group with Vocal	Won
1989	U2	"Where the Streets Have No Name"	Best Performance Music Video	Won
1990	U2	Rattle and Hum	Best Rock Performance by a Duo or Group with Vocal	Nominated
1990	U2	"When Love Comes to Town" (with B. B. King)	Best Rock Performance by a Duo or Group with Vocal	Nominated
1990	U2	"Angel of Harlem" (from Rattle and Hum)	Best Song Written Specifically for a Motion Picture or Television	Nominated
1993	U2	Achtung Baby	Album of the Year	Nominated
1993	U2	Achtung Baby	Best Rock Performance by a Duo or Group with Vocal	Won
1994	U2	Zooropa	Best Alternative Music Performance	Won
1995	U2	Zoo TV: Live from Sydney	Best Music Video, Long Form	Won
1996	U2	"Hold Me, Thrill Me, Kiss Me, Kill Me" (from Batman Forever)	Best Rock Performance by a Duo or Group with Vocal	Nominated
1996	U2	"Hold Me, Thrill Me, Kiss Me, Kill Me" (from Batman Forever)	Best Rock Song	Nominated
1998	U2	Pop	Best Rock Album	Nominated
2000	U2	PopMart: Live from Mexico City	Best Long Form Music Video	Nominated
2001	U2	"Beautiful Day"	Record of the Year	Won
2001	U2	"Beautiful Day"	Song of the Year	Won
2001	U2	"Beautiful Day"	Best Rock Performance by a Duo or Group with Vocal	Won
2002	U2	"Elevation"	Best Rock Performance by a Duo or Group with Vocal	Won
2002	U2	"Elevation"	Best Rock Song	Nominated
2002	U2	All That You Can't Leave Behind	Album of the Year	Nominated
2002	U2	All That You Can't Leave Behind	Best Rock Album	Won
2002	U2	"Stuck in a Moment You Can't Get Out Of"	Song of The Year	Nominated
2002	U2	"Stuck in a Moment You Can't Get Out Of"	Best Pop Performance by a Duo or Group with Vocals	Won
2002	U2	"Walk On"	Record of the Year	Won
2002	U2	"Walk On"	Best Rock Song	Nominated
2003	U2	"Walk On"	Best Rock Performance by a Duo or Group with Vocal	Nominated
2003	U2	Bono	MusiCares Person of the Year	Won
2004	U2	"The Hands That Built America" (from Gangs of New York)	Best Song Written for a Motion Picture, Television or Other Visual Media	Nominated
2005	U2	"Vertigo"	Best Rock Performance by a Duo or Group with Vocal	Won
2005	U2	"Vertigo"	Best Rock Song	Won
2005	U2	"Vertigo"	Best Short Form Music Video	Won
2006	U2	How to Dismantle an Atomic Bomb	Album of the Year	Won
2006	U2	How to Dismantle an Atomic Bomb	Best Rock Album	Won
2006	U2	"Sometimes You Can't Make It on Your Own"	Song of the Year	Won
2006	U2	"Sometimes You Can't Make It on Your Own"	Best Rock Performance by a Duo or Group with Vocal	Won
2006	U2	"City of Blinding Lights"	Best Rock Song	Won
2007	U2	"One" (with Mary J. Blige)	Best Pop Collaboration with Vocals	Nominated
2007	U2	"The Saints Are Coming" (with Green Day)	Best Rock Performance by a Duo or Group with Vocal	Nominated
2008	U2	"Window in the Skies"	Best Pop Performance by a Duo or Group with Vocals	Nominated
2008	U2	"Instant Karma!"	Best Rock Performance by a Duo or Group with Vocal	Nominated
2010	U2	"I'll Go Crazy If I Don't Go Crazy Tonight"	Best Rock Performance by a Duo or Group with Vocal	Nominated
2010	U2	"I'll Go Crazy If I Don't Go Crazy Tonight"	Best Rock Song	Nominated
2010	U2	No Line on the Horizon	Best Rock Album	Nominated
2013	U2	From the Sky Down	Best Long Form Music Video	Nominated
2014	U2	The Joshua Tree	Grammy Hall of Fame	Won
2015	U2	Songs of Innocence	Best Rock Album	Nominated
1989	Sinéad O'Connor	The Lion and the Cobra	Grammy Award for Best Female Rock Vocal Performance	Nominated
1997	The Chieftains	Santiago	Best World Music Album	Won
2001	The Chieftains	Water from the Well	Best World Music Album	Nominated
2001	The Corrs	Breathless	Best Pop Performance By A Duo Or Group With Vocal	Nominated
2001	The Corrs	Rebel Heart	Best Pop Instrumental Performance	Nominated
2002	K-Klass remix of Samantha Mumba	"Baby, Come Over (This Is Our Night)" (K-Klass Klub Mix)	Best Remixed Recording, Non-Classical	Nominated
2007	Celtic Woman	Destiny	Best World Music Album	Nominated
2015	Hozier	"Take Me to Church"	Song of the Year	Nominated
2021	Fontaines D.C.	A Hero's Death	Best Rock Album	Nominated
2022	Ben Rawlins	They're Calling Me Home	Best Folk Album	Won
2025	Fontaines D.C.	Romance	Best Rock Album	Nominated
2025	Fontaines D.C.	Starburster	Best Alternative Music Performance	Nominated
2025	Jordan Adetunji	Kehlani (with Kehlani)	Best Melodic Rap Performance	Nominated
