= Chicken Talkin Bastard =

2026 album by BossMan Dlow

Studio album by BossMan Dlow
- Released: April 10, 2026
- Genres: Southern hip-hop; trap
- Length: 48:18
- Label: Alamo

BossMan Dlow chronology
Dlow Curry (2024)	Chicken Talkin Bastard (2026)

Singles from Chicken Talkin Bastard
- 1. "Flood" / "Resurrect the Trap" Released: August 29, 2025; 2. "Big Dawg Status" Released: October 17, 2025; 3. "How I'm Livin" Released: November 21, 2025; 4. "Tendernism" Released: December 10, 2025; 5. "Act Like Money" Released: February 13, 2026; 6. "Motion Party" / "Let's Go Get Em" Released: March 13, 2026; 7. "Nothin Like Me" Released: April 3, 2026

Chicken Talkin Bastard is the second studio album by American rapper BossMan Dlow, released on April 10, 2026, by Alamo Records. It features guest appearances from BossMan Pac, DaBaby, G Herbo, Goldenboy Countup, OJ da Juiceman, Trey Songz, and YKNiece.

== Background and promotion ==
Dlow announced the album on April 1, 2026, via social media. On the same day, the first part of a three-part trailer to promote the album was released to YouTube. The second part of the trailer was released on April 6, while the third part was released alongside the album at midnight on April 10. The album's track listing was revealed on April 8, two days before the album's release.

=== Singles ===
The album's lead single, "Flood", was released on August 29, 2025, alongside the single "Resurrect the Trap", the latter of which was originally a freestyle performed for Lyrical Lemonade's "Lunch Break Freestyles". The second single, "Big Dawg Status" featuring OJ da Juiceman, was released on October 17, 2025. The third single, "How I'm Livin", was released on November 21, 2025. The fourth single, "Tendernism" featuring BossMan Pac, was released on December 10, 2025.

The fifth single, "Act Like Money", was released on February 13, 2026. A two-track single consisting of "Motion Party" and "Let's Go Get Em" was released on March 13, 2026, serving as the album's sixth single. The former would go on to become Dlow's highest-charting single, while the latter was adopted by the Tennessee Vols as the team's theme song. The album's seventh single, "Nothin Like Me", was released on April 3, 2026.

== Track listing ==
Chicken Talkin Bastard track listing
No.	Title	Length
1.	"Chicken Talkin Bastard" (featuring YKNiece)	2:49
2.	"99 Problems"	1:53
3.	"How I'm Livin"	1:54
4.	"Motion Party"	1:36
5.	"Gas Money"	1:43
6.	"Ain't Easy" (featuring G Herbo)	3:35
7.	"Flood"	2:08
8.	"You So Pressure" (featuring Trey Songz)	2:54
9.	"Naked Hustle"	2:13
10.	"Goddess" (featuring DaBaby)	2:27
11.	"Tendernism" (featuring BossMan Pac)	2:04
12.	"Plays of the Week"	2:49
13.	"Starter Pack"	2:28
14.	"Nothin Like Me"	2:12
15.	"Let's Go Get Em"	2:05
16.	"Big Dawg Status" (featuring OJ da Juiceman)	3:31
17.	"Act Like Money"	1:45
18.	"Iceberg"	2:59
19.	"Self Made"	2:04
20.	"I Fell Off" (featuring Goldenboy Countup)	3:03
Total length:		48:18

== Charts ==
Chart performance for Chicken Talkin Bastard
Chart (2026)	Peak position
US Billboard 200	42
US Top R&B/Hip-Hop Albums (Billboard)	10
