= PJ (song) =

2024 single by BossMan Dlow featuring Lil Baby

Single by BossMan Dlow featuring Lil Baby

from the album Dlow Curry
- Released: July 10, 2024
- Genre: Hip-hop; trap
- Length: 2:58
- Label: Alamo; Sony Music
- Songwriters: Devante McCreary; Dominique Jones; Daniel Schnabel
- Producer: Gentle Beatz

BossMan Dlow singles chronology
"Homebody (Remix)" (2024)	"PJ" / "Ion Wanna Hear It" (2024)	"The Biggest Pt. 2" (2024)

Lil Baby singles chronology
"Pretty Brown" (2024)	"PJ" (2024)	"All Ten" (2024)

Music video
- "PJ" on YouTube

"PJ" is a song by American rapper BossMan Dlow, released on July 10, 2024, as a two-track single along with his song "Ion Wanna Hear It". It features American rapper Lil Baby and was produced by Gentle Beatz, and serves as the lead single from his debut studio album, Dlow Curry (2024).

== Composition ==
In "PJ", BossMan Dlow's lyrics primarily focus on his major come-up, rapping about how he went from eating poor meals to living a life of constant luxury. Meanwhile, Lil Baby's verse gives off the aura of a "straight pimp", surrounded by money and women.

== Critical reception ==
Zachary Horvath of HotNewHipHop reacted favorably toward the song, writing: "Whether it being beating the odds or money talk, Dlow raps about both topics to perfection." RatingsGameMusic was overall positive, writing: "While BossMan starts this track off sounding like the second coming of Usher before transitioning into his distinctive choppy flow, Lil Baby stays too relaxed throughout. Despite that, I do like the combination of their styles."

== Music video ==
The music video was directed by DrewFilmedIt. It sees BossMan Dlow and Lil Baby boarding a private jet as they hold stacks of cash. Aboard the jet, the rappers play a game of craps and bet thousands of dollars on each dice roll. They later arrive in Dlow's hometown of Port Salerno, Florida, where they appear at a block party with several Tesla Cybertrucks.

== Charts ==
Chart performance for "PJ"
Chart (2024)	Peak position
US Billboard Hot 100	86
US Hot R&B/Hip-Hop Songs (Billboard)	28
