= Still Shinin =

Studio album by 4Batz
- Released: September 12, 2025
- Genre: R&B
- Length: 38:00
- Label: BuVision
- Producers: Aaron Bow; Hannah Jackson; Teddy Walton; Thurdi

4Batz chronology
U Made Me a St4r (2024)	Still Shinin (2025)

Singles from Still Shinin
- 1. "Act X: N Da Morning" Released: April 4, 2025; 2. "Act XIII: My Lil Shootah" Released: August 23, 2025

Still Shinin is the debut studio album by American rapper and singer 4Batz, released on September 12, 2025, through BuVision. The album features guest appearances from Flo, Leon Thomas, Maxo Kream and Zillionaire Doe.

== Release and promotion ==
On April 4, 2025, 4Batz released "Act X: N Da Morning" as the lead single from Still Shinin. On August 23, 2025, he announced the albuum and released "Act XIII: My Lil Shootah". It was released through BuVision on September 12, 2025, and was accompanied by a music video for "Act XI: She Ain't No Angel". 4Batz is due to embark on the I'm Still Shinin Tour from October 28 to November 28, 2025.

== Critical reception ==
According to The Source's Shawn Grant, Still Shinin "cements [4Batz's] reputation as one of music’s rising voices" and "[pushes] his artistry to new heights." Malcolm Trap of Rap-Up praised Teddy Walton's production for making the album come together like a "cinematic masterpiece". Sharmaine Johnson of BET thought that 4Batz was "carrying the torch for R&B the way folks have been begging for" and that the album had "no skips".

== Track listing ==
No.	Title	Writer(s)	Producer(s)	Length
1.	"Act IX: Too Dam Young"			1:07
2.	"Act X: N Da Morning"			2:11
3.	"Act XI: She Ain't No Angel" (with Leon Thomas)			2:17
4.	"Act XII: Big on U"			3:05
5.	"Act XIII: My Lil Shootah"	Neko Bennett; Aaron Bow; Hannah Jackson; Teddy Walton; Leon McQuay III	Bow; Jackson; Walton; Thurdi	2:00
6.	"Act XIV: Twerksongggg"			2:20
7.	"Act XV: Could We Last 4ever?"			3:32
8.	"Act XVI: Twentyfoe7" (with Flo)			2:44
9.	"Act XVII: Done Sippin" (with Maxo Kream)			2:13
10.	"Act XVIII: GetUWet"			2:36
11.	"Act XIX: Yo Typical Lovestory"			2:07
12.	"Act XX: U"			3:18
13.	"Act XXI: Can U?"			2:37
14.	"Act XXII: Ms. Walker" (with Zillionaire Doe)			2:17
15.	"Act XXIII: Let's Press Play"			3:29
Total length:				38:00
