= U Made Me a St4r =

Mixtape by 4Batz
- Released: May 3, 2024
- Recorded: 2023–2024
- Studios: 4Batz's mother's house (Dallas, Texas)
- Genre: R&B
- Length: 23:36
- Label: Gamma.
- Producers: Nic Dreams; Sanni Ireoluwakitan; SamX; Seva; 4Batz; Darco; Archippe; Chandler Kourt; Hila; Shineboys Beats

4Batz chronology
U Made Me a St4r (2024)	Still Shinin (2025)

Singles from U Made Me a St4r
- 1. "Act I: Stickerz '99" Released: June 27, 2023; 2. "Act II: Date @ 8" Released: December 15, 2023 (Note: Remix with Drake released on March 8, 2024); 3. "Act III: On God? (She Like)" Released: March 3, 2024; 4. "Act V: There Goes Another Vase" Released: May 1, 2024

U Made Me a St4r is the debut mixtape by American rapper and singer 4Batz, released on May 3, 2024, by Gamma. He recorded the mixtape at his mother's house with a DIY studio set-up, using a $90 handheld microphone and instrumentals he found on YouTube. U Made Me a St4r is an R&B mixtape incorporating elements of hip-hop and pitched-shifted vocals. Its songs, presented as chronological "acts" detailing 4Batz's life, reflect on his relationship with his ex-partner, Jada, and discuss heartbreak, sex, relationships, and love.

U Made Me a St4r was promoted by four singles. The second, "Act II: Date @ 8", went viral on social media at the end of 2023 over a performance video which garnered 4Batz attention for the contrast between his drill-like visuals and musical style. It became his first song to chart on the Billboard Hot 100, resulting in a major-label bidding war. Following the release of a remix with Drake in March 2024, the song reached number 7 on the Billboard Hot 100. A remix of "Act III: On God? (She Like)" featuring Kanye West was featured as the mixtape's final track, whilst a remix of "Act IV: Fckin U (18+)" with Usher was released in July 2024.

U Made Me a St4r earned 21,800 album-equivalent units in its first week to debut at number 30 on the US Billboard 200 chart. Music critics found its material underdeveloped, though some considered it a promising debut. 4Batz embarked on the Thank You, Jada Tour in support of the mixtape in July and August 2024.

== Background and recording ==
Neko Bennett, known professionally as 4Batz, began recording music in 2023. Bennett said he decided to take music seriously following the death of his father and after his long-distance partner of three years, Jada, cheated on him with someone he knew. He told Complex in a 2024 interview that he wanted to write something personal and "talk about how much this girl was a bitch, but still make it sound good". Bennett came up with his stage name by combining the number "4", in reference to South Dallas, with his nickname "Batz".

Bennett initially experimented with different instrumentals and styles, including drill and "emotional music". After deciding to rap over an R&B beat on YouTube, he recorded his first song, "Act I: Stickerz '99", and ultimately decided to make his music in the style of this song, which he said aligned with his influences from 112, Anita Baker, Chief Keef, DMX, Mint Condition, Sade and Tupac Shakur. Bennett discovered all of the instrumentals featured on U Made Me a St4r on YouTube, published as "type-beats". He dedicated himself to recording three songs a night after working a twelve-hour day at a warehouse. He used a DIY studio set-up at his mother's house and a handheld Audio-Technica AT2020 microphone, covered by a sock. Mr. Murrary, a teacher in Bennett's GED program, bought the microphone for him for $90 after he passed a test.

== Composition and lyrics ==
Billboard's Angel Diaz compared the sound of U Made Me a St4r to R&B from the 1990s (such as Jodeci), blended with influences from hip-hop. Sheldon Pearce of NPR compared Bennett to Drake, believing he was aiming for "dualism" between both R&B and hip-hop, and to "be both a rapper and singer, but not in unison"; he also highlighted that its songs were primarily produced by rap producers. A writer for AllMusic described him as an R&B singer/rapper. On certain songs, usually around the halfway mark, Bennett employs pitch-shifted and chopped and screwed vocals. His normal singing voice—which Fraizer Thorpe of GQ described as a baritone—appears on some songs, though he did not disclose which ones.

Most of the mixtape's lyrics reflect on Bennett's relationship with Jada, and he is shown holding a crossed-out photo of her on the mixtape's cover. The songs, which Pearce described as cyclical "capsule exchanges", are presented as chronological "acts" intended to be used years later to retell Bennett's life as a story or Old Testament. The lyrics discuss heartbreak, sex, relationships, and love; Jeff Ihaza of Rolling Stone and Steve Juon of RapReviews observed allusions to a toxic relationship throughout the mixtape, while Pearce viewed its first three acts as recounting a "transactional adolescent romance". Bennett plans to continue the narrative established on the mixtape on his debut album.

=== Songs ===
The intro "UMadeMeAStar.mp3" sees Bennett address allegations of him being an industry plant following his rise to prominence, sampling reactions towards him from various hip-hop media personalities, including DJ Akademiks and Kai Cenat; he says he has been wondering about his rapid success himself. "Act I: Stickerz '99" is about his feelings of wanting and trying to restore his former relationship despite being cheated on. "Act II: Date @ 8" details the length and expenses Bennett says he would go to for a romantic night with his partner. Kyle Denis, also of Billboard, called "Act III: On God? (She Like)" a "toxic love" song. The interlude "Get Out Yo Feelings Ho", which Pearce considered "jarring", is followed by the sex ballad "Act IV: Fckin U (18+)". Juon called it a "raunchy crass R&B" song. "Act V: There Goes Another Vase" presents Bennett in a toxic relationship he cannot remove himself from, and alludes to domestic violence. Thrope wrote that its title lyric underscores "a volatile rapport that just strengthens Batz's belief that the relationship he's singing about is built to last". On "Act VI: Mad Man" Bennett urges his partner to become a more intimate lover. "Act VII: All We Do is Argue, Argue" dives into a failing relationship that HotNewHipHop's Teejay Small described as marred by "cheating, disrespect, and heartache". "Act VIII: Hate to Be Alone" is a 1980s/1990s-style ballad that drew comparisons to New Edition, Whitney Houston, and Timbaland.

== Release and promotion ==
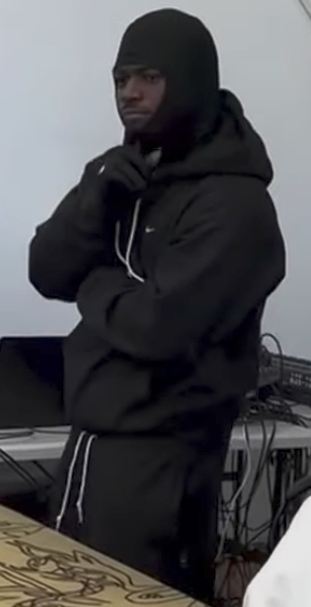
4Batz in April 2024

In June 2023, Bennett released "Act I: Stickerz '99" as his debut single. Whilst looking for people to help produce a music video for the song, he was contacted by Amber Ajeé, a creative manager at RCA Records, who helped him find people for the video and connected him to Vydia, a music distributor owned by Gamma. The video was filmed in Los Angeles and released in October 2023. On December 15, 2023, he released "Act II: Date @ 8" as his second single, five days later followed by a performance video from 4 Shooters Only's From the Block series. The video, filmed in Dallas, shows Bennett lip-syncing to the song wearing a black Shiesty mask, and accompanied by his friends wearing similar attire. The song and video went viral on social media at the end of December 2023, with TikTok users and internet streamers reacting to Bennett's singing and his contrasting, drill-like visual style. The song's success brought Bennett to stardom, and he left his warehouse job shortly thereafter.

By January 2024, "Act II: Date @ 8" had debuted on the Billboard Hot 100, and Bennett had become the subject of a major-label bidding war. Billboard reported Republic, Atlantic, and Warner Records as amongst the labels expressing interest in signing him. On March 3, 2024, Bennett released "Act III: On God? (She Like)" as a single. On March 8, it was announced that he had signed a deal with OVO Sound, owned by Drake, for the release of an extended play (EP). That same day, a remix of "Act II: Date @ 8" featuring Drake was released, and according to Jon Powell of Revolt, Drake shares an experience in a toxic relationship similar to Bennett's and matches his energy. The remix received mixed reactions on social media.

In an interview with Billboard that month, Bennett revealed plans to release U Made Me a St4r. The mixtape was initially due to release on April 5, 2024, but was delayed a day before its planned release to allow Bennet to "perfect" it. On May 1, 2024, he released "Act V: There Goes Another Vase" as the fourth and final single. The mixtape was released two days later on May 3 by Gamma, alongside a short film. A remix of "Act III: On God? (She Like)" featuring Kanye West, which extends the length of the original by 19 seconds, was included as a bonus track. Its release through Gamma instead of OVO and Drake's absence on it led to speculation of a feud, which Bennett denied.

On July 17, 2024, a remix of "Act IV: Fckin U (18+)" featuring Usher was released. From July 29 to August 10, 2024, Bennett embarked on his debut headlining concert tour, the Thank You, Jada Tour. The tour's stage setup consisted of a couch and bed on one side and stripper pole on the other. Bennett performed live without Auto-Tune, and was joined onstage by several backup dancers. During his debut performance in Dallas on August 7, 2024, he gave a woman in the crowd more than $1,200 for her haircut and manicure in reference to the lyrics of "Act II: Date @ 8".

== Critical reception ==
U Made Me a St4r ratings
Review scores
Source	Rating
AllMusic	2/5 stars
RapReviews	6.5/10

HotNewHipHop's Small felt that Bennett was too young and inexperienced to handle some of the subject matters he talked about on U Made Me a St4r, especially on "Act IV: Fckin U (18+)" and "Act V: There Goes Another Vase". A writer for AllMusic said that, "regardless of the buzz and celebrity endorsements surrounding him, [4Batz's] music at this point is lifeless and without much personality." Ihaza of Rolling Stone said there was "no reason for [the mixtape] to exist" and lacked both originality and impact. He believed that Bennett's look and sound had appeal, but that his potential had been quashed by his rapid ascent to fame and "[seemed] to be a new kind of victim of success".

On a more positive side, Complex's Jordan Rose wrote that Bennett "still has room to grow", but that the mixtape "is compelling enough to make you want to keep reading". RapReviews's Juon deemed U Made Me a St4r to be "an interesting debut" overall, but criticized individual elements, including the pitched up and pitch corrected vocals and West's feature on the remix of "Act III: On God? (She Like)". Diaz of Billboard highlighted "Act III: On God (She Like)" and "Act V: There Goes Another Vase" as songs that "sound different from anything out right now." NPR's Pearce said that the "self-contained nebulousness" of 4batz' music made it "idiosyncratic", but also sounded like it was "still in a developmental stage".

== Commercial performance ==
U Made Me a St4r debuted at number 30 on the US Billboard 200, earning 21,800 album-equivalent units in its first week. The original version of "Act II: Date @ 8" debuted on the Billboard Hot 100 at number 77 and peaked at number 59. Following the release of the Drake remix, it ascended from number 61 to number 7 on the Billboard Hot 100 and topped the Billboard Hot R&B Songs chart on March 20, 2024, giving Bennett his first top 10 hit. "Act I: Stickerz 99" and "Act III: On God (She Like)" also charted on the Hot R&B Songs chart at numbers 19 and 10, respectively.

== Track listing ==
All tracks are written by Neko Bennett; track 3 written with Sanni Ireoluwakitan, tracks 7 and 9 written with Nicolás Rodríguez, and track 11 written with Kanye West.

U Made Me a St4r track listing
No.	Title	Producers	Length
1.	"UMadeMeAStar.mp3"	4Batz	0:40
2.	"Act I: Stickerz '99'"	Nic Dreams	1:44
3.	"Act II: Date @ 8"	Ireoluwakitan	1:54
4.	"Act III: On God? (She Like)"	SamX; Seva	2:50
5.	"Get Out Yo Feelings Ho"	4Batz	0:25
6.	"Act IV: Fckin U (18+)"	Dreams	2:10
7.	"Act V: There Goes Another Vase"	Dreams	2:55
8.	"Act VI: Mad Man"	SamX; Darco	2:39
9.	"Act VII: All We Do Is Argue, Argue"	Dreams; Archippe; Chandler Kourt; Hila	2:21
10.	"Act VIII: I Hate to Be Alone"	Shineboys Beats	2:48
11.	"Act III: On God? (She Like)" (remix featuring Kanye West)	SamX; Seva	3:10
Total length:			23:36

== Personnel ==
Personnel per Tidal.

Musicians

- 4Batz – vocals, keyboards (5)
- Nic Dreams – keyboards (2, 6, 7, 9)
- Sanni Ireoluwakitan – keyboards (3)
- SamX – keyboards (4, 8, 11)
- Seva – keyboards (4, 11)
- Shineboys Beats – keyboards (10)
- Kanye West – vocals (11)
Production
- 4Batz – recording engineer, mixing engineer (2–4, 6–11), mastering engineer (1–5, 7), programming (5)
- Tod Bergman – mixing engineer (1, 5)
- Sing Mastering – mastering engineer (6, 8–11)
- Nic Dreams – programming (2, 6, 7, 9)
- Sanni Ireoluwakitan – programming (3)
- SamX – programming (4, 8, 11)
- Seva – programming (4, 11)
- Shineboys Beats – programming (10)

== Charts ==
U Made Me a St4r chart performance
Chart (2024)	Peak position
Canadian Albums (Billboard)	87
US Billboard 200	30
