= Mr Beat the Road =

2024 mixtape by BossMan Dlow

Mixtape by BossMan Dlow
- Released: March 15, 2024
- Genre: Southern hip hop; trap
- Length: 39:02
- Label: Alamo
- Producer: BB; Beats by Taz; Celobeatz; DJ Jam305; Dxntemadeit; Exquisite J; Gentle Beatz; Gonzo; Hardknock; Jxnoir; King Nathan; Mazereckless; Nate B; Prophet; ScenarioFaryoo; Yakree

BossMan Dlow chronology
2 Slippery (2023)	Mr Beat the Road (2024)	Dlow Curry (2024)

Singles from Mr Beat the Road
- 1. "Get in with Me" Released: January 18, 2024; 2. "Mr Pot Scraper" Released: February 23, 2024

Mr Beat the Road is the second mixtape by American rapper BossMan Dlow, released on March 15, 2024, by Alamo Records. It features guest appearances from Rob49, Sexyy Red, and Wizz Havinn. It was supported by the viral singles "Get in with Me" and "Mr Pot Scraper". The album peaked at number 20 on the US Billboard 200.

== Critical reception ==
Professional ratings
Review scores
Source	Rating
AllMusic	3/5 stars
Pitchfork	7.0/10

Alphonse Pierre of Pitchfork praised the mixtape, writing, "The 'Get in With Me' rapper's single-minded focus on getting money and spending it irresponsibly is a perfect distraction from the precarity of real life. AllMusic described the mixtape as "great fun but [it] stays in one gear for so much of the time that its songs become a little indistinguishable from one another."

== Commercial performance ==
Mr Beat the Road debuted at number 20 on the US Billboard 200. On November 26, 2024, the album was certified gold by the Recording Industry Association of America (RIAA).

== Track listing ==
Mr Beat the Road track listing
No.	Title	Writer(s)	Producer(s)	Length
1.	"Pressure"	Devante McCreary; Jackson Thomas; Nathanial Bell	Exquisite J; Nate B	2:02
2.	"21"	McCreary; Jason Morris	Jxnoir	2:11
3.	"Dove"	McCreary; Victor Lassila	Hardknock	2:23
4.	"Boss Talk"	McCreary; Brian Bell; Marcelo Hang Lopez	BB; Celobeatz	2:01
5.	"Get in with Me"	McCreary; Donte Ononiewu	Dxntemadeit	2:01
6.	"Mr Pot Scraper"	McCreary; Nathan Silfain	King Nathan	2:25
7.	"Lil Bastard" (featuring Rob49)	McCreary; Daniel Schnabel; Matthew Forde; Robert Coleman Thomas	Gentle Beatz; Gonzo	3:00
8.	"Dopeman"	McCreary; Elijah Lyandres; Jack Thierer	Prophet; Yakree	2:04
9.	"Come Here" (featuring Sexyy Red)	McCreary; Janae Wherry; Silfain	King Nathan	3:15
10.	"Talk My Shit"	McCreary; Emmanuel Kolapo	DJ Jam305	1:44
11.	"Trippin"	McCreary; Silfain	King Nathan	1:45
12.	"Obama Runtz" (featuring Wizz Havinn)	McCreary; Schnabel; Tareek Williams	Gentle Beatz	3:07
13.	"Piss Me Off"	McCreary; Schnabel	Gentle Beatz	2:25
14.	"Money Over Bitches"	McCreary; Schnabel	Gentle Beatz	2:12
15.	"Mike Smiff"	McCreary; Tevin Blands	Beats by Taz	2:12
16.	"Muscle Up"	McCreary; Ononiewu; Jaxson Mcneely; Piotr Antoszek	Dxntemadeit; ScenarioFaryoo; Mazereckless	1:49
17.	"22"	McCreary; Silfain	King Nathan	2:26
Total length:				39:02

== Charts ==
=== Weekly charts ===
Weekly chart performance for Mr Beat the Road
Chart (2024)	Peak position
US Billboard 200	20
US Top R&B/Hip-Hop Albums (Billboard)	7

=== Year-end charts ===
Year-end chart performance for Mr Beat the Road
Chart (2024)	Position
US Billboard 200	140
US Top R&B/Hip-Hop Albums (Billboard)	45

== Certifications ==
Certifications and sales for Mr Beat the Road
Region	Certification	Certified units/sales
United States (RIAA)	Gold	500,000^{‡}
^{‡} Sales+streaming figures based on certification alone.
