= List of Billboard number-one R&B/hip-hop albums of 2024 =

This page lists the albums that reached number-one on the overall Billboard Top R&B/Hip-Hop Albums chart, the R&B Albums chart, and the Rap Albums chart in 2024. The R&B Albums and Rap Albums charts partly serve as respective distillations for R&B and rap-specific titles of the overall R&B/Hip-Hop Albums chart.

== Chart history ==
Key
†	Indicates best-performing album of 2024

Issue date	Top R&B/Hip-Hop Albums	Artist(s)	Top R&B Albums	Artist(s)	Top Rap Albums	Artist(s)	Ref.
January 6	Pink Friday 2	Nicki Minaj	The Christmas Song	Nat King Cole	Pink Friday 2	Nicki Minaj	
January 13	For All the Dogs †	Drake	SOS †	SZA	For All the Dogs †	Drake	
January 20	For All the Dogs †	Drake	SOS †	SZA	For All the Dogs †	Drake	
January 27	American Dream	21 Savage	SOS †	SZA	American Dream	21 Savage	
February 3	American Dream	21 Savage	SOS †	SZA	American Dream	21 Savage	
February 10	American Dream	21 Savage	SOS †	SZA	American Dream	21 Savage	
February 17	SOS	SZA	SOS †	SZA	American Dream	21 Savage	
February 24	Vultures 1	¥$: Ye and Ty Dolla Sign	Coming Home	Usher	Vultures 1	¥$: Ye and Ty Dolla Sign	
March 2	Vultures 1	¥$: Ye and Ty Dolla Sign	SOS †	SZA	Vultures 1	¥$: Ye and Ty Dolla Sign	
March 9	Vultures 1	¥$: Ye and Ty Dolla Sign	SOS †	SZA	Vultures 1	¥$: Ye and Ty Dolla Sign	
March 16	Vultures 1	¥$: Ye and Ty Dolla Sign	SOS †	SZA	Vultures 1	¥$: Ye and Ty Dolla Sign	
March 23	Vultures 1	¥$: Ye and Ty Dolla Sign	SOS †	SZA	Vultures 1	¥$: Ye and Ty Dolla Sign	
March 30	SOS	SZA	SOS †	SZA	Vultures 1	¥$: Ye and Ty Dolla Sign	
April 6	We Don't Trust You	Future and Metro Boomin	SOS †	SZA	We Don't Trust You	Future and Metro Boomin	
April 13	We Don't Trust You	Future and Metro Boomin	SOS †	SZA	We Don't Trust You	Future and Metro Boomin	
April 20	Might Delete Later	J. Cole	SOS †	SZA	Might Delete Later	J. Cole	
April 27	We Still Don't Trust You	Future and Metro Boomin	SOS †	SZA	We Still Don't Trust You	Future and Metro Boomin	
May 4	We Don't Trust You	Future and Metro Boomin	SOS †	SZA	We Don't Trust You	Future and Metro Boomin	
May 11	We Don't Trust You	Future and Metro Boomin	SOS †	SZA	We Don't Trust You	Future and Metro Boomin	
May 18	We Don't Trust You	Future and Metro Boomin	SOS †	SZA	We Don't Trust You	Future and Metro Boomin	
May 25	One of Wun	Gunna	SOS †	SZA	One of Wun	Gunna	
June 1	One of Wun	Gunna	SOS †	SZA	One of Wun	Gunna	
June 8	We Don't Trust You	Future and Metro Boomin	SOS †	SZA	Right Place, Wrong Person	RM	
June 15	We Don't Trust You	Future and Metro Boomin	SOS †	SZA	We Don't Trust You	Future and Metro Boomin	
June 22	We Don't Trust You	Future and Metro Boomin	SOS †	SZA	We Don't Trust You	Future and Metro Boomin	
June 29	Hardstone Psycho	Don Toliver	SOS †	SZA	Hardstone Psycho	Don Toliver	
July 6	New World Depression	Suicideboys	SOS †	SZA	New World Depression	Suicideboys	
July 13	Megan	Megan Thee Stallion	SOS †	SZA	Megan	Megan Thee Stallion	
July 20	Megan	Megan Thee Stallion	SOS †	SZA	Megan	Megan Thee Stallion	
July 27	The Death of Slim Shady (Coup de Grâce)	Eminem	SOS †	SZA	The Death of Slim Shady (Coup de Grâce)	Eminem	
August 3	The Death of Slim Shady (Coup de Grâce)	Eminem	SOS †	SZA	The Death of Slim Shady (Coup de Grâce)	Eminem	
August 10	The Death of Slim Shady (Coup de Grâce)	Eminem	SOS †	SZA	The Death of Slim Shady (Coup de Grâce)	Eminem	
August 17	Vultures 2	¥$: Ye and Ty Dolla Sign	SOS †	SZA	Vultures 2	¥$: Ye and Ty Dolla Sign	
August 24	SOS	SZA	SOS †	SZA	Sugar Honey Iced Tea	Latto	
August 31	SOS	SZA	SOS †	SZA	The Diamond Collection	Post Malone	
September 7	Days Before Rodeo	Travis Scott	SOS †	SZA	Days Before Rodeo	Travis Scott	
September 14	Love Lasts Forever	Destroy Lonely	SOS †	SZA	Love Lasts Forever	Destroy Lonely	
September 21	SOS	SZA	SOS †	SZA	We Don't Trust You	Future and Metro Boomin	
September 28	Days Before Rodeo	Travis Scott	SOS †	SZA	Days Before Rodeo	Travis Scott	
October 5	Mixtape Pluto	Future	SOS †	SZA	Mixtape Pluto	Future	
October 12	Mixtape Pluto	Future	SOS †	SZA	Mixtape Pluto	Future	
October 19	Mixtape Pluto	Future	SOS †	SZA	Mixtape Pluto	Future	
October 26	Last Lap	Rod Wave	The Highlights	The Weeknd	Last Lap	Rod Wave	
November 2	Lyfestyle	Yeat	SOS †	SZA	Lyfestyle	Yeat	
November 9	Chromakopia	Tyler, the Creator	SOS †	SZA	Chromakopia	Tyler, the Creator	
November 16	Chromakopia	Tyler, the Creator	SOS †	SZA	Chromakopia	Tyler, the Creator	
November 23	Chromakopia	Tyler, the Creator	SOS †	SZA	Chromakopia	Tyler, the Creator	
November 30	Chromakopia	Tyler, the Creator	SOS †	SZA	Chromakopia	Tyler, the Creator	
December 7	GNX	Kendrick Lamar	SOS †	SZA	GNX	Kendrick Lamar	
December 14	GNX	Kendrick Lamar	Merry Christmas	Mariah Carey	GNX	Kendrick Lamar	
December 21	GNX	Kendrick Lamar	The Christmas Song	Nat King Cole	GNX	Kendrick Lamar	
December 28	GNX	Kendrick Lamar	Merry Christmas	Mariah Carey	GNX	Kendrick Lamar	

== See also ==
- 2024 in American music
- 2024 in hip hop music
- List of Billboard 200 number-one albums of 2024
- List of Billboard Hot R&B/Hip-Hop Songs number ones of 2024
