= SportsCenter (song) =

2024 single by BossMan Dlow

Single by BossMan Dlow
- Released: June 13, 2024
- Length: 2:23
- Label: Alamo
- Songwriter: Devante McCreary
- Producer: Luh Ron Mayde Dis

BossMan Dlow singles chronology
"I Can't Wait" (2024)	"SportsCenter" (2024)	"Homebody (Remix)" (2024)

Music video
- "SportsCenter" on YouTube

"SportsCenter" is a song by American rapper BossMan Dlow, released on June 13, 2024. It was produced by Luh Ron Mayde Dis.

== Background ==
In an interview with Billboard, BossMan Dlow said of the song, "Yeah, that's one we're gonna make it the sports anthem. You could damn near play that before your games. We're gonna try to make it a broad song." He also stated that the ESPN television program SportsCenter was a big part of his life while growing up.

== Composition ==
The production features "blistering" basslines with synthesizers, as well as "crisp" hi-hats and 808s. In the lyrics, BossMan Dlow boasts his wealth and makes references to basketball and football.

== Charts ==
Chart performance for "SportsCenter"
Chart (2024)	Peak position
US Bubbling Under Hot 100 Singles (Billboard)	19
US Hot R&B/Hip-Hop Songs (Billboard)	34
