= Talk My Shit =

2024 song by BossMan Dlow

Song by BossMan Dlow

from the album Mr Beat the Road
- Released: March 15, 2024
- Length: 1:44
- Label: Alamo
- Songwriters: Devante McCreary; Emmanuel Kolapo
- Producer: DJ Jam305

Music video
- "Talk My Shit" on YouTube

"Talk My Shit" is a song by American rapper BossMan Dlow from his second mixtape Mr Beat the Road (2024), which was produced by DJ Jam305.

== Critical reception ==
In his review of Mr Beat the Road, Alphonse Pierre of Pitchfork stated, "Lyrical repetitiveness works in Dlow's favor because the songs are so easy to memorize. I pop when he hollers about his shopping sprees—$1,300 at Prada, $1,250 at Lanvin, and $1,500 at Balenciaga, to name a few—or comes up with yet another way to say he's liquid: 'Pockets full of (clucking sound) I'm starting to walk like a chicken, nigga,' he raps on the uptempo 'Talk My Shit.'"

== Charts ==
=== Weekly charts ===
Weekly chart performance for "Talk My Shit"
Chart (2024)	Peak position
US Bubbling Under Hot 100 Singles (Billboard)	7
US Hot R&B/Hip-Hop Songs (Billboard)	50

=== Year-end charts ===
2024 year-end chart performance for "Talk My Shit"
Chart (2024)	Position
US Hot R&B/Hip-Hop Songs (Billboard)	75
