= Mr Pot Scraper =

2024 single by BossMan Dlow

Single by BossMan Dlow

from the album Mr Beat the Road
- Released: February 23, 2024
- Length: 2:25
- Label: Alamo
- Songwriters: Devante McCreary; Nathanael Pierrelus
- Producer: King Nathan

BossMan Dlow singles chronology
"Kickin Fashion" (2024)	"Mr Pot Scraper" (2024)	"4AM at Coffee Zone (Florida Avengers)" (2024)

Music video
- "Mr Pot Scraper" on YouTube

"Mr Pot Scraper" is a song by American rapper BossMan Dlow, released on February 23, 2024 as the second single from his mixtape Mr Beat the Road (2024). It was produced by King Nathan.

== Composition ==
The beat of the song contains piano.

== Critical reception ==
Zachary Horvath of HotNewHipHop praised the performance of the song, stating "One of things that stands out about Bossman Dlow is his delivery and some of his off-kilter flows."

== In popular culture ==
The song was featured in the 2026 video game Grand Theft Auto VI.

== Charts ==
=== Weekly charts ===
Weekly chart performance for "Mr Pot Scraper"
Chart (2024)	Peak position
US Billboard Hot 100	93
US Hot R&B/Hip-Hop Songs (Billboard)	33

=== Year-end charts ===
2024 year-end chart performance for "Mr Pot Scraper"
Chart (2024)	Position
US Hot R&B/Hip-Hop Songs (Billboard)	69
