= Jordan Adetunji =

Northern Irish rapper and singer (born 1999)

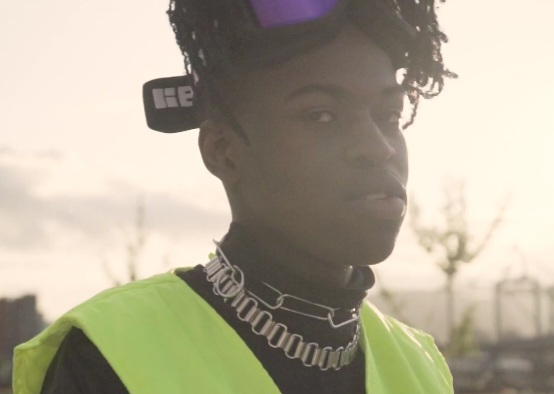
- Adetunji in 2019

Background information
- Born: Jordan Adebowale Adetunji; 25 February 1999 (age 27); Croydon, London, England
- Origin: Belfast, Northern Ireland
- Genre: Alternative hip-hop
- Occupations: Rapper; singer; songwriter
- Years active: 2019–present
- Labels: Indigo Kid; 300 (current); RCA (former)
- Website: jordanadetunji.com

Jordan Adebowale Adetunji (born 25 February 1999) is a British rapper and singer. He gained recognition in 2024 with his breakout global hit "Kehlani". In 2023, Adetunji was scouted by Oli Sykes and signed to RCA Records. In 2024, following the rise in popularity of "Kehlani", Adetunji signed with 300 Entertainment and Warner Records UK.

== Early life ==
Adetunji was born in Croydon, London. When he was 10 years old, his mother made the decision to move to Belfast because of how "quiet" it seemed in comparison to Croydon. Adetunji is of Nigerian descent. He attended Ashfield Boys' High School where he learned to play musical instruments, focusing on trumpet lessons.

He was influenced and inspired by Gary Moore, a fellow alumni of Ashfield. This led him to dive into Thin Lizzy's music. Later, he explored heavier bands like Static-X and found Joy Division through a video game, which led him to watch the Ian Curtis biopic.

His first major influence was Michael Jackson. He admired his ability to master any genre and this left a lasting impression on him. Other influences include Busta Rhymes and The Weeknd.

== Career ==
=== 2019–2023: Career beginnings and Rock 'N' Rave ===
Adetunji began posting rap videos on his Facebook account while at school before he started to add elements of the guitar to them. While in school, at the age of 15 or 16, Adetunji played the trumpet in his school, allowing him to experiment with new sounds.

He gained recognition by posting contemporary music to TikTok, allowing him to be recruited by Bring Me the Horizon lead vocalist and primary lyricist Oli Sykes, resulting in him singing to RCA Records and Sony Music UK. After building up some hype through several singles, Adetunji released his debut mixtape, Rock 'n' Rave, described as "Jersey club-inspired bounce, and sharp, glitchy sonics".

=== 2024–present: Mainstream success and "Kehlani" ===
On 19 May 2024, Adetunji released the single "Kehlani", an ode to the American singer of the same name. With the track, Adetunji was hailed Billboard's R&B / Hip-Hop "Rookie of the Month". The track also marked Adetunji's first appearance on the Official Charts, the Billboard Hot 100, the Canadian Hot 100, and the Billboard Global 200. The success of the track led to Adetunji signing a record deal with 300 Entertainment and Warner Records UK. His second mixtape, A Jaguar's Dream, was released on 24 January 2025.

== Personal life ==
Adetunji has expressed passion for football and video games. He is a supporter of Chelsea F.C. He stated that he "love[s]" Japanese culture and anime, stating that the latter inspires his artwork, stating that he tries "to make everything look like a scene from a manga".

== Discography ==
=== Mixtapes ===
Title	Details
Rock 'n' Rave	Released: 13 October 2023; Label: Indigo Kid, RCA; Formats: Digital download, streaming
A Jaguar's Dream	Released: 24 January 2025; Label: 300 Entertainment, Warner UK; Formats: Digital download, streaming

=== Singles ===
List of singles as a lead artist, with selected chart positions, year released, and album name
Title	Year	Peak chart positions										Certifications	Album
Title	Year	UK	AUS	CAN	FRA	GER	IRE	NLD	NZ	US	WW	Certifications	Album
"Close 2 You"	2020	—	—	—	—	—	—	—	—	—	—		Non-album singles
"Shock 'Em" (with JyellowL and Evans Junior)	2020	—	—	—	—	—	—	—	—	—	—		Non-album singles
"Black Kings" (with Jahmiel)	2020	—	—	—	—	—	—	—	—	—	—		Non-album singles
"Wasting Time"	2021	—	—	—	—	—	—	—	—	—	—		Non-album singles
"Insecure (Love Yourself)" (solo or featuring Deyaz)	2022	—	—	—	—	—	—	—	—	—			Non-album singles
"You & I"	2023	—	—	—	—	—	—	—	—	—	—		Rock 'n' Rave
"Go"	2023	—	—	—	—	—	—	—	—	—	—		Rock 'n' Rave
"Things You Do"	2023	—	—	—	—	—	—	—	—	—	—		Rock 'n' Rave
"Involved"	2023	—	—	—	—	—	—	—	—	—	—		Rock 'n' Rave
"Can't Lose"	2023	—	—	—	—	—	—	—	—	—	—		Rock 'n' Rave
"Zack & Cody"	2024	—	—	—	—	—	—	—	—	—	—		Non-album singles
"Kehlani" (solo or featuring Kehlani)	2024	8	23	34	172	37	19	71	19	24	21	BPI: Gold; ARIA: Gold; RIAA: Platinum	A Jaguar's Dream
"Options" (featuring Lil Baby)	2024	—	—	—	—	—	—	—	—	—	—		A Jaguar's Dream
"Too Many Women" (featuring kwn)	2025	—	—	—	—	—	—	—	—	—	—		A Jaguar's Dream
"305" (with Bryson Tiller)	2025	—	—	—	—	—	—	—	— (Note: "305" did not enter the NZ Top 40 Singles Chart, but peaked at number 37 on the NZ Hot Singles Chart.)	—	—		A Jaguar's Dream
"X n The City"	2025	—	—	—	—	—	—	—	—	—	—		
"Drama"	2025	—	—	—	—	—	—	—	—	—	—		
"Smoke n Drank"	2025	—	—	—	—	—	—	—	—	—	—		
"In Between"	2026	—	—	—	—	—	—	—	—	—	—		
"Climbing Up"	2026	—	—	—	—	—	—	—	—	—	—		
"Who Is It"	2026	—	—	—	—	—	—	—	—	—	—		
"Distraction"	2026	—	—	—	—	—	—	—	—	—	—		
"—" denotes a recording that did not chart or was not released in that territory.

== See also ==
- List of Irish Grammy Award winners and nominees
