= I Know? =

2023 single by Travis Scott

Single by Travis Scott

from the album Utopia
- Released: September 26, 2023
- Recorded: 2023
- Studio: Shangri-La (California)
- Genre: Melodic rap
- Length: 3:31
- Label: Cactus Jack; Epic
- Songwriters: Jacques Webster II; Ozan Yildirim; Scotty Coleman; Josiah Sherman; Kobe Hood; Terrance George
- Producers: Travis Scott; Oz; Coleman; Buddy Ross (addi.)

Travis Scott singles chronology
"Meltdown" (2023)	"I Know?" (2023)	"Say My Grace" / "Likka Sto 2" (2023)

Music video
- "I KNOW ?" on YouTube

"I Know?" (stylized as "I KNOW ?") is a song by American rapper and singer Travis Scott. Originally released on July 28, 2023, as a track from his fourth studio album Utopia via Cactus Jack and Epic Records, it was sent to US pop radio as the fourth single on September 26. With a "nerve-jangling" piano instrumental, the song was written by Scott himself, Oz, Coleman, Buddy Ross, Kobe Hood, & Terrance George, and produced by the former four.

== Critical reception ==
"I Know?" received generally positive reviews from music critics. Eric Skelton of Complex considered it to be one of the best songs from Utopia, while Mike Destefano said that the song "is fine, but not the most captivating track in comparison to everything else going on here". Vivian Medithi of HipHopDX deemed it the best song from Utopia, writing it "feels as delirious and delicate as maintaining a balanced buzz at the end of a long night", before adding "If 'Maria, I'm Drunk' was dancing on the tables, 'I KNOW ?' is nodding off in VIP". In an album review, Thomas Galindo of American Songwriter felt that "while Scott's raps have never been the most substantive or introspective, the chemistry he finds with the immensely impressive production allows him to fit his voice perfectly into the pockets of his beats", citing "I Know?" as one of the songs that best display the type of quality. Andre Gee of Rolling Stone responded less favorably, commenting that "'I Know?' is the obligatory 'about a girl in my harem' song, but there are five artists on the album (Drake, Future, 21 Savage, Young Thug, even the Weeknd) who could've done more than Scott with his solo moment". Mackenzie Cummings-Grady of Billboard placed "I Know?" at number 15 in her ranking of the 19 songs from Utopia.

== Music video ==
The music video for "I Know?" was filmed at the Orum residence in Bel Air, Los Angeles, and featured American supermodels Emily Ratajkowski and Anok Yai; it was co-directed by Scott and Dave Meyers.

== Charts ==
=== Weekly charts ===
Weekly chart performance for "I Know?"
Chart (2023–2024)	Peak position
Australia (ARIA)	20
Australia Hip Hop/R&B (ARIA)	10
Austria (Ö3 Austria Top 40)	43
Canada Hot 100 (Billboard)	11
Czech Republic Singles Digital (ČNS IFPI)	33
Denmark (Tracklisten)	38
France (SNEP)	34
Germany (GfK)	71
Global 200 (Billboard)	13
Greece International (IFPI)	11
Hungary (Single Top 40)	27
Iceland (Tónlistinn)	12
Ireland (IRMA)	83
Italy (FIMI)	52
Latvia (LaIPA)	12
Lithuania (AGATA)	30
Luxembourg (Billboard)	11
MENA (IFPI)	13
New Zealand (Recorded Music NZ)	10
Norway (VG-lista)	35
Poland (Polish Streaming Top 100)	31
Portugal (AFP)	27
Romania (Billboard)	24
South Africa Streaming (TOSAC)	8
Sweden (Sverigetopplistan)	98
Switzerland (Schweizer Hitparade)	20
UK Singles (Official Charts)	62
UK Hip Hop/R&B (Official Charts)	31
US Billboard Hot 100	11
US Hot R&B/Hip-Hop Songs (Billboard)	5
US Pop Airplay (Billboard)	18
US Rhythmic Airplay (Billboard)	1

=== Year-end charts ===
2023 year-end chart performance for "I Know?"
Chart (2023)	Position
Canada (Canadian Hot 100)	86
US Hot R&B/Hip-Hop Songs (Billboard)	42
US Streaming Songs (Billboard)	60

2024 year-end chart performance for "I Know?"
Chart (2024)	Position
Canada (Canadian Hot 100)	80
Global 200 (Billboard)	178
US Hot R&B/Hip-Hop Songs (Billboard)	40
US Rhythmic (Billboard)	29

== Certifications ==
Certifications for "I Know?"
Region	Certification	Certified units/sales
Austria (IFPI Austria)	Gold	15,000^{‡}
Brazil (Pro-Música Brasil)	3× Platinum	120,000^{‡}
Canada (Music Canada)	4× Platinum	320,000^{‡}
Denmark (IFPI Danmark)	Gold	45,000^{‡}
France (SNEP)	Gold	100,000^{‡}
Italy (FIMI)	Gold	50,000^{‡}
Mexico (AMPROFON)	Platinum	140,000^{‡}
New Zealand (RMNZ)	Platinum	30,000^{‡}
Poland (ZPAV)	Platinum	50,000^{‡}
Portugal (AFP)	Platinum	10,000^{‡}
Switzerland (IFPI Switzerland)	Gold	15,000^{‡}
United Kingdom (BPI)	Silver	200,000^{‡}
United States (RIAA)	3× Platinum	3,000,000^{‡}
Streaming
Greece (IFPI Greece)	Platinum	2,000,000^{†}
^{‡} Sales+streaming figures based on certification alone.^{†} Streaming-only figures based on certification alone.
