= BossMan Dlow =

American rapper (born 1998)

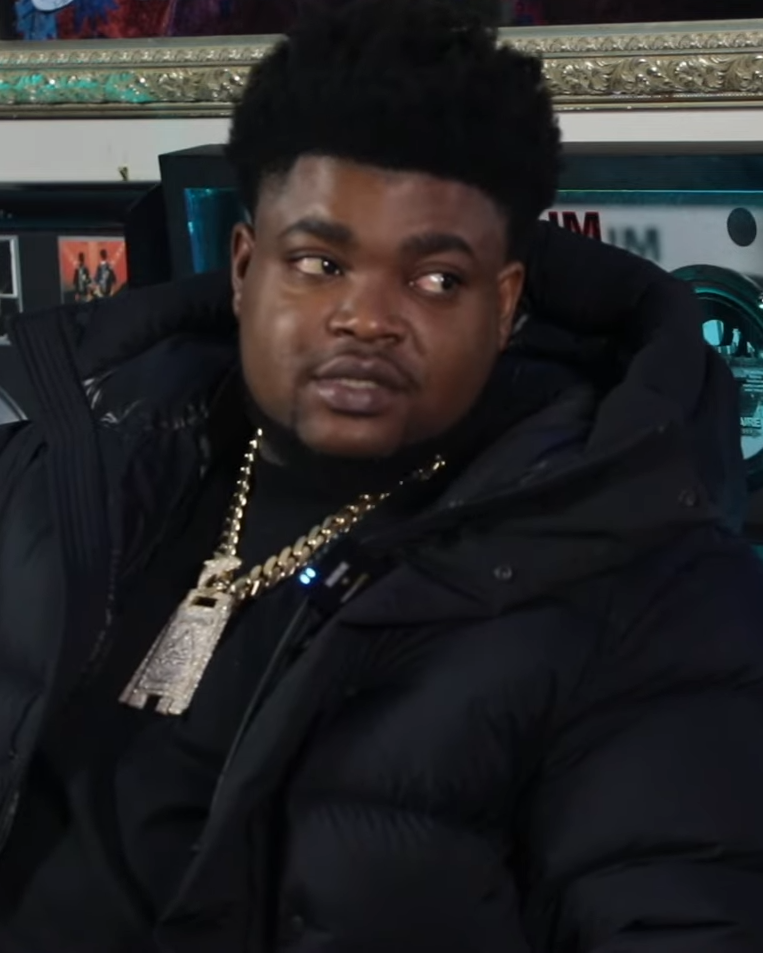
- BossMan Dlow in 2024

Background information
- Born: Devante Milan McCreary; August 31, 1998 (age 27); Port Salerno, Florida, U.S.
- Genres: Southern hip-hop; trap
- Occupation: Rapper
- Years active: 2019–present
- Label: Alamo

Devante Milan McCreary (born August 31, 1998), known professionally as BossMan Dlow, is an American rapper. He started rapping while serving time in county jail in 2019 and soon became popular in the Florida rap scene. After releasing the mixtape Too Slippery and its Alamo Records re-release 2 Slippery in 2023, his 2024 breakout single "Get in with Me" became popular on TikTok and Instagram and marked his debut on the Billboard Hot 100. He also released his debut studio album, Dlow Curry, in 2024.

== Life and career ==
Devante Milan McCreary was born on August 31, 1998 in Port Salerno, Florida, where he was also raised. His father works as a truck driver and he has one brother named Tory, whom McCreary has stated inspired him to pursue music. He began rapping in 2019 as BossMan Dlow before briefly serving time in county jail on charges of selling and possessing cocaine. His music first gained popularity in Tallahassee before spreading to other parts of Florida.

BossMan Dlow released his debut mixtape Too Slippery in January 2023, which gained traction on TikTok. He signed a record deal with Alamo Records in the summer of 2023, who re-released Too Slippery as 2 Slippery in December 2023.

His single "Get in with Me", originally performed as a freestyle on the Jacksonville–based series Kreepin Through the Streetz, was released through Alamo Records in January 2024. It soon became popular on Instagram and TikTok—particularly due to a feud between Rick Ross's ex-partner, Tia Kemp, and his daughter, Toie Roberts, during which Kemp posted a video using the song—and subsequently debuted on Billboard's Hot 100 and Hot R&B/Hip-Hop Songs charts the following month. It peaked at number 49 on the Hot 100 after spending five weeks on the chart. His single "Mr Pot Scraper" was released in February of that year and also became popular. BossMan Dlow's third mixtape, Mr Beat the Road, was released on March 15, 2024, with "Get in with Me", "Mr Pot Scraper", and "Piss Me Off" as its singles. A remix of his song "Finesse", from his mixtape 2 Slippery, with rapper GloRilla was released later that month. In August 2024, BossMan Dlow featured on Ciara's single "Run It Up".

BossMan Dlow's debut studio album, Dlow Curry, was released on December 13, 2024. The album features guest appearances by Babyface Ray, French Montana, GloRilla, Ice Spice, Lil Baby, and NoCap. It received positive reviews and debuted at number 36 on the US Billboard 200. The album's deluxe edition was released on May 23, 2025, featuring an additional guest appearance from Gucci Mane. His second studio album, Chicken Talkin Bastard, was released on April 10, 2026.

== Musical style ==
BossMan Dlow has listed Wiz Khalifa, Babyface Ray, Yo Gotti, Jeezy, Lil Wayne, Plies, and Future as his musical influences. He has described his songs as "motivation music". Alphonse Pierre of Pitchfork wrote that his "dope-dealing motivation rap" was backed by "Michigan-meets-the-South party beats". For Uproxx, Aaron Williams wrote that BossMan Dlow had a "choppy, unconventional delivery and [a] Florida twang" in his raps. Joey Ech of XXL wrote that BossMan Dlow had "impeccable swagger, [a] conversational cadence and [a] booming baritone voice".

== Discography ==
=== Studio albums ===
Title	Album details	Peak chart positions
Title	Album details	US
Dlow Curry	Released: December 13, 2024; Label: Alamo; Format: Digital download, streaming	36
Chicken Talkin Bastard	Released: April 10, 2026; Label: Alamo; Format: CD, digital download, streaming	42

=== Mixtapes ===
List of mixtapes, with year released
Title	Album details	Peak chart positions		Certifications
Title	Album details	US	US R&B/HH	Certifications
Too Slippery	Released: January 1, 2023; Label: Self-released; Format: Digital download, streaming	—	—	
2 Slippery	Released: December 20, 2023; Label: Alamo; Format: Digital download, streaming	179	—	
Mr Beat the Road	Released: March 15, 2024; Label: Alamo; Format: Digital download, streaming	20	7	RIAA: Gold

=== Singles ===
==== As lead artist ====
List of singles as lead artist, with selected chart positions, showing year released and album name
Title	Year	Peak chart positions			Certifications	Album
Title	Year	US	US R&B/HH	US Rhy.	Certifications	Album
"Bag Right"	2020	—	—	—		Non-album singles
"I Aint Going Broke"	2020	—	—	—		Non-album singles
"Turnt"	2020	—	—	—		Non-album singles
"Chemistry"	2020	—	—	—		Non-album singles
"Same 24"	2021	—	—	—		Non-album singles
"Dat Part"	2021	—	—	—		Non-album singles
"Do Numbers"	2021	—	—	—		Non-album singles
"Grammy"	2021	—	—	—		Non-album singles
"Get Paid"	2021	—	—	—		Non-album singles
"Goat-ified"	2021	—	—	—		Non-album singles
"Gucci"	2022	—	—	—		Non-album singles
"Pressin Freestyle"	2022	—	—	—		Non-album singles
"Trust"	2022	—	—	—		Non-album singles
"Aye Yea"	2022	—	—	—		Too Slippery
"Cookie Jar"	2023	—	—	—		Non-album singles
"Biker"	2023	—	—	—		Non-album singles
"Flat"	2023	—	—	—		Non-album singles
"Big One"	2023	—	—	—		Non-album singles
"Phil Jackson"	2023	—	—	—		2 Slippery
"I'm Him"	2023	—	—	—		Non-album singles
"Real Trapper"	2023	—	—	—		Non-album singles
"The Biggest" (featuring YTB Fatt)	2023	—	—	—		Non-album singles
"Get in with Me"	2024	49	16	26	RIAA: Platinum	Mr Beat the Road
"Mr Pot Scraper"	2024	93	33	—	RIAA: Gold	Mr Beat the Road
"Come Here" (featuring Sexyy Red)	2024	—	—	—		Mr Beat the Road
"Finesse" (featuring GloRilla)	2024	— (Note: "Finesse" did not enter the Billboard Hot 100, but peaked at number one on the Bubbling Under Hot 100 chart.)	37	—	RIAA: Platinum	Non-album singles
"SportsCenter"	2024	— (Note: "SportsCenter" did not enter the Billboard Hot 100, but peaked at number 19 on the Bubbling Under Hot 100 chart.)	34	—	RIAA: Gold	Non-album singles
"PJ" (with Lil Baby)	2024	86	28	—	RIAA: Gold	Dlow Curry
"The Biggest Pt. 2"	2024	—	—	—		Dlow Curry
"Dlow Curry"	2024	—	—	—		Dlow Curry
"What You Need" (featuring NoCap)	2024	—	—	—		Dlow Curry
"Sum Out of Nun"	2025	—	—	—		Dlow Curry (deluxe edition)
"Money Talks"	2025	—	—	—		Dlow Curry (deluxe edition)
"Hit" (featuring Gucci Mane)	2025	—	47	—		Dlow Curry (deluxe edition)
"Flood" / "Resurrect the Trap"	2025	—	—	—		Chicken Talkin Bastard
"Big Dawg Status"	2025	—	—	—		Chicken Talkin Bastard
"How I'm Livin"	2025	—	—	—		Chicken Talkin Bastard
"Tendernism" (featuring OJ da Juiceman)	2025	—	—	—		Chicken Talkin Bastard
"Act Like Money"	2026	—	—	—		Chicken Talkin Bastard
"Motion Party"	2026	37	9	1		Chicken Talkin Bastard
"Let's Go Get Em"	2026	—	—	—		Chicken Talkin Bastard
"Nothin Like Me"	2026	—	—	—		Chicken Talkin Bastard
"—" denotes a recording that did not chart or was not released in that territory.

==== As featured artist ====
List of singles as featured artist, with showing year released and originating album
Title	Year	Album
"Run It Up" (Ciara featuring BossMan Dlow)	2024	Non-album singles
"Homebody" (Rob49 featuring Moneybagg Yo, BossMan Dlow & Sada Baby)	2024	Non-album singles
"I Can't Wait" (Trae tha Truth featuring BossMan Dlow)	2024	Crowd Control
"Oh Shit" (Nardo Wick featuring BossMan Dlow)	2024	Non-album singles
"See the World" (Buddah Bless, Big Sean and 2 Chainz featuring BossMan Dlow)	2025	Buddah Bless the Street

=== Other charted songs ===
List of other charted songs, with selected chart positions, showing year released and album name
Title	Year	Peak chart positions				Certifications	Album
Title	Year	US	US R&B/HH	CAN	LTU	Certifications	Album
"Shake Dat Ass (Twerk Song)"	2023	54	12	—	—	RIAA: Platinum	Too Slippery
"Talk My Shit"	2024	— (Note: "Talk My Shit" did not enter the Billboard Hot 100, but peaked at number seven on the Bubbling Under Hot 100 chart.)	50	—	—	RIAA: Platinum	Mr Beat the Road
"2 Slippery" (Luh Tyler featuring BossMan Dlow)	2024	— (Note: "2 Slippery" did not enter the Billboard Hot 100, but peaked at number six on the Bubbling Under Hot 100 chart.)	29	—	—		Mr. Skii
"Mo Chicken" (featuring French Montana)	2025	— (Note: "Mo Chicken" did not enter the Billboard Hot 100, but peaked at number 16 on the Bubbling Under Hot 100 chart.)	31	—	—		Dlow Curry
"Stop Snitching" (ASAP Rocky featuring Sauce Walka and Bossman Dlow)	2026	62	20	91	64		Don't Be Dumb

=== Guest appearances ===
List of non-single guest appearances, with other performing artists, showing year released and album name
Title	Year	Other performer(s)	Album
"Outta Town"	2024	Moneybagg Yo	Speak Now... (Deluxe)
"Worth a Ticket"	2024	Wizz Havinn	Fresh Out The Trenches
"Rules"	2024	Sauce Walka	Saucefather 2
"Bubble Up"	2024	Mike Smiff	Thinking Out Loud
"Booby Trap on the River"	2024	Skilla Baby	The Coldest (Deluxe)
"2 Slippery"	2024	Luh Tyler	Mr. Skii
"Count Money"	2024	Babyface Ray	The Kid That Did
"Step"	2024	GloRilla	Glorious
"Cut Ties"	2025	Bryson Tiller	Solace & The Vices
