= Shake Dat Ass (Twerk Song) =

2023 song by BossMan Dlow

Song by BossMan Dlow

from the album Too Slippery
- Released: January 1, 2023
- Genre: Hip hop; Trap; Dirty rap
- Length: 3:16
- Label: Alamo
- Songwriter: Devante McCreary
- Producer: HardKnock

Music video
- "Shake Dat Ass (Twerk Song)" on YouTube

"Shake Dat Ass (Twerk Song)" is a song by American rapper BossMan Dlow from his debut mixtape Too Slippery (2023). It was produced by HardKnock. The song went viral on the video-sharing app TikTok, where it spawned a dance challenge.

== Live performances ==
On October 15, 2024, BossMan Dlow performed a medley of the song and his song "Get in with Me" at BET.

== Charts ==
=== Weekly charts ===
Weekly chart performance for "Shake Dat Ass (Twerk Song)"
Chart (2024)	Peak position
US Billboard Hot 100	54
US Hot R&B/Hip-Hop Songs (Billboard)	12
US Rhythmic (Billboard)	5

=== Year-end charts ===
2024 year-end chart performance for "Shake Dat Ass (Twerk Song)"
Chart (2024)	Position
US Hot R&B/Hip-Hop Songs (Billboard)	77

2025 year-end chart performance for "Shake Dat Ass (Twerk Song)"
Chart (2025)	Position
US Hot R&B/Hip-Hop Songs (Billboard)	98
US R&B/Hip-Hop Airplay (Billboard)	10
