= Help Me (Real Boston Richey song) =

2024 single by Real Boston Richey

Single by Real Boston Richey

from the album Richey Rich
- Released: May 31, 2024
- Genre: Trap
- Length: 3:01
- Label: Freebandz; Epic
- Songwriters: Jalen Foster; Paul Williams
- Producer: MacFly

Real Boston Richey singles chronology
"Lose Control" (2024)	"Help Me" (2024)	"Get in There" (2024)

Music video
- "Help Me" on YouTube

"Help Me" is the major-label debut single by American rapper Real Boston Richey, released on May 31, 2024, and produced by MacFly. It is his first song to chart, debuting at number 93 on the Billboard Hot 100 and peaking at number 47.

== Composition ==
The song finds Real Boston Richey lyrically detailing his personal problems and searching for answers to them, over an 808-heavy instrumental.

== Critical reception ==
Zachary Horvath of HotNewHipHop gave a favorable review of the song, writing that Real Boston Richey's delivery "makes his bars extremely convincing" and "If this is a shift in Richey's career, we are here for it."

== Charts ==
=== Weekly charts ===
Weekly chart performance for "Help Me"
Chart (2024)	Peak position
US Billboard Hot 100	47
US Hot R&B/Hip-Hop Songs (Billboard)	9
US Rhythmic (Billboard)	15

=== Year-end charts ===
2024 year-end chart performance for "Help Me"
Chart (2024)	Position
US Hot R&B/Hip-Hop Songs (Billboard)	63

2025 year-end chart performance for "Help Me"
Chart (2025)	Position
US Hot R&B/Hip-Hop Songs (Billboard)	33
US R&B/Hip-Hop Airplay (Billboard)	14
