= Real Boston Richey =

American rapper (born 1997)

- Foster in 2024

Background information
- Born: Jalen Taheen Foster; February 4, 1997 (age 29); Tallahassee, Florida, U.S.
- Genres: Hip hop; trap
- Occupations: Rapper; songwriter
- Years active: 2021–present
- Label: Freebandz

Jalen Taheen Foster (born February 4, 1997), known professionally as Real Boston Richey, is an American rapper from Tallahassee, Florida. He is currently signed to Future's record label Freebandz, and is noted for his usage of Michigan-style hip-hop production. His mixtape Public Housing peaked at number 60 on the Billboard 200.

== Career ==
Richey began rapping in 2021 after the passing of his cousin and from a suggestion from his close friends. In March 2022, he released his single "Keep Dissing". In August 2022, Future appeared on his single "Bullseye 2" and gifted Richey a chain after signing him to his Freebandz record label. Also in August 2022, he released a 17-track mixtape titled Public Housing. In October 2022, Lil Durk appeared on his single "Keep Dissing 2" and its subsequent music video.

== Personal life ==
In April 2025, Foster was arrested and charged with family violence after allegedly assaulting and choking his girlfriend.

== Discography ==
=== Studio albums ===
List of studio albums, with selected details and chart positions
Title	Album details	Peak chart positions	
Title	Album details	US	US R&B/HH
Welcome to Bubba Land	Released: September 8, 2023; Label: Freebandz, Epic; Format: CD, digital download, streaming	94	42
Richey Rich	Released: November 8, 2024; Label: Freebandz, Epic; Format: Digital download, streaming	48	—

=== Mixtapes ===
List of mixtapes, with selected details and chart positions
Title	Album details	Peak chart positions		
Title	Album details	US	US R&B/HH	US Rap
Public Housing	Released: August 26, 2022; Label: Freebandz, Open Shift; Format: CD, digital download, streaming	60	34	22
Public Housing, Pt. 2	Released: January 6, 2023; Label: Freebandz, Open Shift; Format: CD, digital download, streaming	38	22	15

=== Extended plays ===
List of EPs, with selected details
Title	EP details
Trappin & Finessin	Released: February 27, 2023; Label: Freebandz, Open Shift; Format: CD, digital download, streaming

=== Singles ===
List of singles, with selected peak chart positions
Title	Year	Peak chart positions			Certifications	Album
Title	Year	US	US R&B/HH	US Rap	Certifications	Album
"Bullseye"	2021	—	—	—		Non-album singles
"Keep Dissing"	2022	—	—	—		Non-album singles
"Everybody"	2022	—	—	—		Public Housing
"Certified Dripper"	2022	—	—	—		Non-album singles
"Keep Dissing 2" (with Lil Durk)	2022	—	—	—		Public Housing
"Yes, You Did"	2022	—	—	—		Non-album singles
"Where You Been"	2022	—	—	—		Public Housing
"Bullseye" (with Future)	2022	—	—	—		Public Housing
"2 Million Up" (with Peezy and Jeezy featuring Rob49)	2022	—	—	—		Non-album singles
"On Site"	2022	—	—	—		Public Housing
"Win For Losin"	2023	—	—	—		Public Housing
"Fire in the Booth, Pt. 1" (with Charlie Sloth)	2023	—	—	—		Non-album singles
"5 Star"	2023	—	—	—		Non-album singles
"My Image"	2023	—	—	—		Non-album singles
"Neck of the Woods"	2023	—	—	—		Non-album singles
"Send a Blitz"	2023	—	—	—		Non-album singles
"Keep on Gettin It"	2023	—	—	—		Welcome to Bubba Land
"Black Truck"	2023	—	—	—		Welcome to Bubba Land
"The Type" (featuring YTB Fatt)	2023	—	—	—		Richey Rich
"Lose Control" (with C Stunna and DJ Drama)	2024	—	—	—		Still Stuntin
"Help Me"	2024	47	9	6	RIAA: Platinum	Richey Rich
"Get in There" (featuring GloRilla)	2024	—	—	—		Richey Rich
"Go Richey"	2024	—	—	—		Non-album singles
"Help Me 2"	2024	—	—	—		Non-album singles
"One Hit Wonder"	2025	—	—	—		Non-album singles
"Mr. Pay For Shit"	2025	—	—	—		Non-album singles
"—" denotes a title that did not chart, or was not released in that territory.
