= Act II: Date @ 8 =

Single by 4Batz

from the album U Made Me a St4r
- Released: December 15, 2023
- Genre: R&B
- Length: 1:53
- Label: Gamma
- Songwriter: Neko Bennett
- Producer: Sanni Ireoluwakitan

4Batz singles chronology
"Act I: Stickerz '99'" (2023)	"Act II: Date @ 8" (2023)	"Act III: On God? (She Like)" (2024)

Drake singles chronology
"You Broke My Heart" (2023)	"Act II: Date @ 8" (remix) (2024)	"Push Ups" (2024)

Music video
- "4Batz — act ii: date @ 8" (Official Visualizer) on YouTube

"Act II: Date @ 8" is a song by the American singer 4Batz, initially released independently on December 15, 2023. Written by 4Batz and produced by Sanni Ireoluwakitan, it peaked at number seven on the Billboard Hot 100, number one on the Hot R&B Songs chart, and number three on the Hot R&B/Hip-Hop Songs chart following a remix with Canadian rapper Drake. 4Batz's video performance for the song went viral on TikTok as internet streamers and viewers reacted in surprise to his singing, which unexpectedly contrasted the drill-like visuals featured in the video.

== Background and release ==
On March 4, 2024, Canadian rapper Drake announced a remix of "Act II: Date @ 8" alongside co-signing 4Batz. The following day, American singer Robin Thicke performed a cover on the song. On March 8, Drake remixed "Act II: Date @ 8" with 4Batz via OVO Sound.

== Personnel ==
- 4Batz – vocals, songwriter, recording engineer, mixing engineer, mastering engineer
- Sanni Ireoluwakitan – songwriter, producer, keyboards, programming

== Charts ==
=== Weekly charts ===
Weekly chart performance for "Act II: Date @ 8"
Chart (2024)	Peak position
Australia Hip Hop/R&B (ARIA)	21
Australia New Music Singles (ARIA)	20
Austria (Ö3 Austria Top 40)	72
Canada (Canadian Hot 100)	14
Denmark (Tracklisten)	37
Global 200 (Billboard)	15
Ireland (IRMA)	28
Luxembourg (Billboard)	24
Netherlands (Single Top 100)	62
New Zealand (Recorded Music NZ)	15
Portugal (AFP)	59
South Africa (Billboard)	17
Sweden (Sverigetopplistan)	73
Switzerland (Schweizer Hitparade)	26
UK Singles (Official Charts)	18
UK Hip Hop/R&B (Official Charts)	5
UK Indie (Official Charts)	38
US Billboard Hot 100	7
US Hot R&B/Hip-Hop Songs (Billboard)	3
US Rhythmic Airplay (Billboard)	3

=== Year-end charts ===
2024 year-end chart performance for "Act II: Date @ 8"
Chart (2024)	Position
US Billboard Hot 100	80
US Hot R&B/Hip-Hop Songs (Billboard)	23
US Rhythmic (Billboard)	26
