= Get in with Me =

2024 single by Bossman Dlow

Single by BossMan Dlow

from the album Mr Beat the Road
- Released: January 18, 2024
- Genre: Trap
- Length: 2:00
- Label: Alamo; Sony Music
- Songwriters: Devante McCreary; Donte Ononiewu
- Producer: Dxntemadeit

BossMan Dlow singles chronology
"The Biggest" (2023)	"Get in with Me" (2024)	"Right Now" (2024)

Music video
- "Get in with Me" on YouTube

"Get in with Me" is a song by American rapper BossMan Dlow, released on January 18, 2024, as a two-track single along with his song "Piss Me Off". Considered his breakout hit, it gained traction on the video-sharing platform TikTok and became his first song to chart on the Billboard Hot 100, debuting at number 68.

== Background ==
"Get in with Me" originated as a freestyle rap that BossMan Dlow performed on the freestyle series Kreepin Through the Streetz. A clip of the performance went viral on Instagram and TikTok, due to his "choppy, unconventional delivery" and "Florida twang". The song has been used in over 130,000 clips on TikTok.

According to Luminate, the song amassed 8.4 million official streams in the United States in the February 2–8 tracking week.

== Composition ==
The song contains a "pummeling Michigan-style beat", over which BossMan Dlow raps about topics such as reckless driving and going to the club for free.

== Charts ==
=== Weekly charts ===
Weekly chart performance for "Get in with Me"
Chart (2024)	Peak position
US Billboard Hot 100	49
US Hot R&B/Hip-Hop Songs (Billboard)	16
US Rhythmic (Billboard)	16

=== Year-end charts ===
2024 year-end chart performance for "Get in with Me"
Chart (2024)	Position
US Hot R&B/Hip-Hop Songs (Billboard)	38

== Certifications ==
Certifications for "Get in with Me"
Region	Certification	Certified units/sales
United States (RIAA)	Gold	500,000^{‡}
^{‡} Sales+streaming figures based on certification alone.
