= 4Batz =

American singer (born 2003)

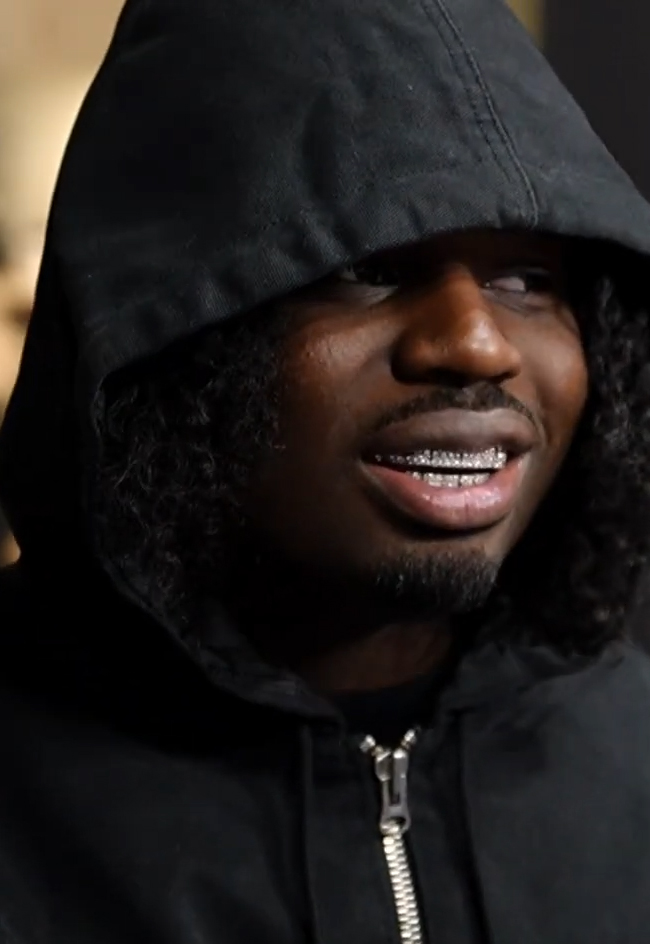
- 4Batz in 2025

Background information
- Born: Neko Bennett; November 5, 2003 (age 22); Dallas, Texas, U.S.
- Genre: R&B
- Occupations: Singer; songwriter
- Years active: 2023–present
- Labels: BuVision; Gamma
- Partner: Anycia (2025–present)
- Website: 4batz.com

Neko Bennett (born November 5, 2003), known professionally as 4Batz, is an American R&B singer from Dallas, Texas. He is best known for his 2023 single "Act II: Date @ 8", one of his various songs that went viral on TikTok, which spawned a remix featuring Canadian rapper Drake. Bennett's style has been described as gentle and atmospheric, and is known for its stark contrast from the song's accompanying music videos, which typically show drill-esque content. The song preceded and served as lead single for his debut mixtape, U Made Me a St4r (2024). His debut album, Still Shinin, was released on September 12, 2025.

== Career ==
=== 2023–2024: Early success and debut extended play ===
Bennett started his music career in 2023, releasing his debut single "Act I: Stickerz '99". The song gained mainstream attention, with him following up with releasing his hit single "Act II: Date @ 8" in December of that year. His video performance for the song went viral on TikTok as internet streamers. Viewers reacted with surprise to Bennett's singing, which unexpectedly contrasted with the drill-like visuals in the video. He received further success from the song, debuting at number 7 on the Hot R&B Songs chart. The song became Bennett's first appearance on the Billboard Hot 100, its solo version peaking at number 59.

In January 2024, Kanye West called Bennett his favorite new artist and co-signed him. Bennett also received support from Canadian rapper Drake. Bennett's third single, "Act III: On God? (She Like)" was released on March 3, 2024. On March 8, 2024, a remix of "Act II: Date @ 8" with Drake was released via OVO Sound, propelling the song to the top ten of the Billboard Hot 100. On March 9, 2024, Bennett signed a recording deal with OVO Sound for the release of his debut extended play. On May 3, 2024, Bennett released his debut mixtape U Made Me a St4r, which included a remix of "Act III: On God? (She Like)" with Kanye West.

=== 2025-present: Single releases, and debut studio album ===
Entering 2025, Bennett released his first single of the year, titled "Mortal Kombat". He then followed through with a two-pack EP titled since yall say ion drop enough to address to his fans that he still drops music. The EP includes "hope u don't mind", and "me u & pride". In June, he released "When I Get Back Home", a collaborative track with Wale. In July, he released "Wya" with Sexyy Red. In August and September, he released two lead singles, titled "act xiii: my lil shootah", and "act xi: she ain't no angel" with Leon Thomas, for his debut studio album, Still Shinin. On September 12, he released Still Shinin.

== Personal life ==
In February 2025, American rapper Anycia confirmed that she was in a relationship with Bennett.

== Discography ==
=== Studio albums ===
List of studio albums, with selected details
Title	Details
Still Shinin	Released: September 12, 2025; Label: BuVision; Format: Digital download, streaming

=== Mixtapes ===
List of mixtapes, with selected details and peak chart positions
Title	Details	Peak chart positions	
Title	Details	US	CAN
U Made Me a St4r	Released: May 3, 2024; Label: Gamma; Format: CD, LP, digital download, streaming	30	87

=== Singles ===
List of singles, showing selected chart positions and associated albums
Title	Year	Peak chart positions										Album
Title	Year	US	US R&B /HH	AUT	CAN	IRE	NLD	NZ	SWE	SWI	UK	Album
"Act I: Stickerz '99'"	2023	—	—	—	—	—	—	—	—	—	—	U Made Me a St4r
"Act II: Date @ 8" (solo or remix featuring Drake)	2023	7	3	72	14	28	62	15	73	26	18	U Made Me a St4r
"Act III: On God? (She Like)" (solo or remix featuring Kanye West)	2024	— (Note: "Act III: On God? (She Like)" did not chart on the Billboard Hot 100, but did peak at number 20 on the Bubbling Under Hot 100, which is an extension of the Hot 100.)	48	—	—	—	—	— (Note: "Act III: On God? (She Like)" did not chart on the New Zealand Top 40 Singles, but did peak at number 18 on the Top 40 Hot Singles.)	—	—	—	U Made Me a St4r
"Put Yo Gun 2 Use On the Radar (Freestyle)"	2024	—	—	—	—	—	—	—	—	—	—	Non-album single
"Act V: There Goes Another Vase"	2024	—	—	—	—	—	—	— (Note: "Act V: There Goes Another Vase" did not enter the NZ Top 40 Singles Chart, but peaked at number 38 on the NZ Hot Singles Chart.)	—	—	—	U Made Me a St4r
"Act IV: Fukin U Again (18+)" (solo or remix featuring Usher)	2024	—	—	—	—	—	—	—	—	—	—	U Made Me a St4r
"Roll da Dice" (with Lil Baby)	2024	— (Note: "Roll da Dice" did not chart on the Billboard Hot 100, but did peak at number 23 on the Bubbling Under Hot 100, which is an extension of the Hot 100.)	—	—	—	—	—	— (Note: "Roll da Dice" did not enter the NZ Top 40 Singles Chart, but peaked at number 15 on the NZ Hot Singles Chart.)	—	—	—	Non-album single
"Hood Grammy"	2024	—	—	—	—	—	—	—	—	—	—	Non-album single
"Mortal Kombat"	2024	—	—	—	—	—	—	—	—	—	—	Non-album single
"N Da Morning"	2025	—	—	—	—	—	—	—	—	—	—	Still Shinin'
"When I Get Home" (featuring Wale)	2025	—	—	—	—	—	—	—	—	—	—	Non-album single
"WYA" (featuring Sexyy Red)	2025	—	—	—	—	—	—	—	—	—	—	Non-album single
"My Lil Shoota"	2025	—	—	—	—	—	—	—	—	—	—	Still Shinin'
"—" denotes releases that did not chart or were not released in that region.
