= Kehlani (song) =

2024 single by Jordan Adetunji

Single by Jordan Adetunji

from the album A Jaguar's Dream
- Released: 19 May 2024
- Length: 2:02
- Label: 300
- Songwriter: Jordan Adetunji
- Producers: Prodbyli; VillaBeatz

Jordan Adetunji singles chronology
"Zack & Cody" (2024)	"Kehlani" (2024)

Music video
- "Kehlani" on YouTube

"Kehlani" is a song by British rapper and singer Jordan Adetunji, released on 19 May 2024. Named after the American singer Kehlani, it went viral on the video-sharing site TikTok and is considered Adetunji's breakout hit.

== Background ==
Within the first three days of its release, the song collected over 115,000 official on-demand streams in the United States. On 23 May 2024, Kehlani posted two videos on TikTok featuring her lip-syncing to the song. The song has since gained significant popularity on the platform. Jordan Adetunji has stated:

Making a song about Kehlani was a no brainer to me, her confidence and huge cultural impact is something I love! I love confidence. Especially when people do things that put themselves out there, doing things out the norm and showing huge ambition. When I made the track in my room I posted the snippet and when I seen the hype I recorded a new verse and dropped it everywhere within two days after! It made so much sense for me to get this song out asap.

== Composition ==
The song contains a simple drill beat and a sample of "Potential" by Summer Walker, over which Jordan Adetunji sings in fast-paced R&B vocals. In addition to Kehlani, he references South African singer Tyla's breakout hit "Water" in the lyrics.

== Remix ==
"Kehlani (Remix)"

Remix by Jordan Adetunji and Kehlani

from the album A Jaguar’s Dream
- Released: 2 August 2024
- Length: 2:59
- Label: 300
- Songwriters: Jordan Adetunji; Kehlani Parrish
- Producers: Prodbyli; VillaBeatz

On 2 August 2024, Adetunji released a remix of "Kehlani" featuring Kehlani. The release included a music video with both artists.

Awards and nominations for "Kehlani (Remix)"
Organization	Year	Category	Result	Ref.
Grammy Awards	2025	Best Melodic Rap Performance	Nominated	

== Charts ==
=== Weekly charts ===
Weekly chart performance for "Kehlani"
Chart (2024)	Peak position
Australia (ARIA)	23
Australia Hip Hop/R&B (ARIA)	4
Austria (Ö3 Austria Top 40)	38
Canada Hot 100 (Billboard)	34
France (SNEP)	172
Germany (GfK)	37
Global 200 (Billboard)	21
Ireland (IRMA)	19
Lithuania (AGATA)	36
Luxembourg (Billboard)	11
Netherlands (Single Top 100)	57
New Zealand (Recorded Music NZ)	19
Portugal (AFP)	23
Slovakia Singles Digital (ČNS IFPI)	79
South Africa Streaming (TOSAC)	6
Sweden (Sverigetopplistan)	73
Switzerland (Schweizer Hitparade)	29
UK Singles (OCC)	8
UK Hip Hop/R&B (OCC)	1
US Billboard Hot 100	24
US Hot R&B/Hip-Hop Songs (Billboard)	3
US Rhythmic Airplay (Billboard)	1

Chart performance for "Kehlani" (Remix)
Chart (2024)	Peak position
New Zealand Hot Singles (RMNZ)	9

=== Year-end charts ===
2024 year-end chart performance for "Kehlani"
Chart (2024)	Position
Australia Hip Hop/R&B (ARIA)	34
Canada (Canadian Hot 100)	94
Global 200 (Billboard)	183
Switzerland (Schweizer Hitparade)	95
US Hot R&B/Hip-Hop Songs (Billboard)	30
US R&B/Hip-Hop Airplay (Billboard)	37
US Rhythmic (Billboard)	41

2025 year-end chart performance for "Kehlani"
Chart (2025)	Position
US Hot R&B/Hip-Hop Songs (Billboard)	62
US R&B/Hip-Hop Airplay (Billboard)	13

== Certifications ==
Certifications for "Kehlani"
Region	Certification	Certified units/sales
Australia (ARIA)	Gold	35,000^{‡}
Canada (Music Canada)	2× Platinum	160,000^{‡}
France (SNEP)	Gold	100,000^{‡}
New Zealand (RMNZ)	Platinum	30,000^{‡}
Poland (ZPAV)	Gold	25,000^{‡}
Portugal (AFP)	Platinum	10,000^{‡}
United Kingdom (BPI)	Platinum	600,000^{‡}
United States (RIAA)	Platinum	1,000,000^{‡}
^{‡} Sales+streaming figures based on certification alone.
