= Flo Milli discography =

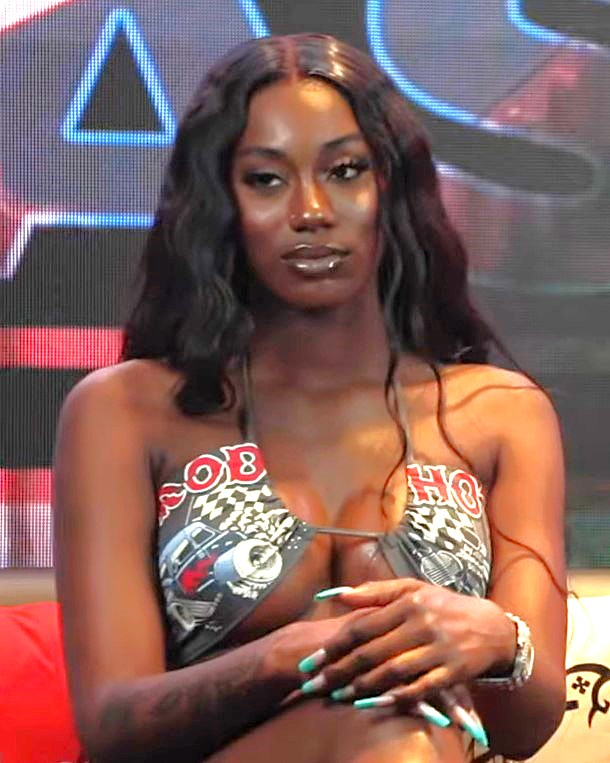
- Flo Milli in 2024
- Studio albums: 2
- Singles: 61
- Music videos: 44
- Mixtapes: 1

American rapper and singer Flo Milli has released two studio albums, one mixtape, sixty-one singles (including twenty-nine as a featured artist), and forty-four music videos (including sixteen as a featured artist). In her early career, Flo Milli released two singles "Beef FloMix" (2018) and "In the Party" (2019), and both were successful on social media. After the success of her first two singles, Milli signed to '94 Sound and RCA Records. In 2021, "In the Party" and "Beef FloMix" were certified gold by the Recording Industry Association of America. She released her debut mixtape, Ho, Why Is You Here?, in 2020. After the release of the mixtape, Milli started working on her debut studio album, You Still Here, Ho?, which was released in 2022 and peaked at number 78 on the Billboard 200 and number 46 on the Billboard Top R&B/Hip-Hop Albums. "Conceited", one of its singles, was certified gold by the RIAA.

Between You Still Here, Ho? (2022) and her latest album, Fine Ho, Stay (2024), she released the singles "Einstein", "No Love Shemix", "Anything Flows" as part of a brand deal with 7-Eleven, "Fruit Loop", "Chocolate Rain", "BGC", and "B.T.W." as a cover of Too Short's "Blow the Whistle". In mid-2023, "In the Party" was certified platinum by the RIAA. That November, she released "Never Lose Me" as the lead single for Fine Ho, Stay, which reached number 15 on the Billboard Hot 100 and has since been certified platinum by the RIAA, platinum in Australia, and silver in the United Kingdom. In early 2024, Fine Ho, Stay was released and peaked at number 54 on the Billboard 200 and number 20 on the Billboard Top R&B/Hip-Hop Albums.

== Studio albums ==
List of studio albums, with selected details
Title	Album details	Peak chart positions	
Title	Album details	US	US R&B/HH
You Still Here, Ho?	Released: July 20, 2022; Label: '94 Sounds, RCA; Format: Digital download, streaming	—	—
Fine Ho, Stay	Released: March 15, 2024; Label: '94 Sounds, RCA; Format: Digital download, streaming	54	20

== Mixtapes ==
List of mixtapes, with selected details and charted positions
Title	Mixtape details	Peak chart positions	
Title	Mixtape details	US	US R&B/HH
Ho, Why Is You Here?	Released: July 24, 2020; Label: '94 Sounds, RCA; Format: Digital download, streaming	78	46

== Singles ==
=== As lead artist ===
List of singles as lead artist, with selected chart positions and certifications, showing year released and album name
Title	Year	Peak chart positions										Certifications	Album
Title	Year	US	US R&B /HH	US Rap	AUS	CAN	IRE	NLD	NZ	UK	WW	Certifications	Album
"Beef FloMix"	2018	—	—	—	—	—	—	—	—	—	—	RIAA: Gold	Ho, Why Is You Here?
"In the Party"	2019	—	—	—	—	—	—	—	—	—	—	RIAA: Platinum	Ho, Why Is You Here?
"My Attitude"	2020	—	—	—	—	—	—	—	—	—	—		Non-album single
"Not Friendly"	2020	—	—	—	—	—	—	—	—	—	—		Ho, Why Is You Here?
"Eat It Up"	2020	—	—	—	—	—	—	—	—	—	—		Non-album single
"Like That Bitch"	2020	—	—	—	—	—	—	—	—	—	—		Ho, Why Is You Here?
"Weak"	2020	—	—	—	—	—	—	—	—	—	—		Ho, Why Is You Here?
"May I"	2020	—	—	—	—	—	—	—	—	—	—		Ho, Why Is You Here?
"Hot" (remix) (with Pia Mia featuring Sean Paul)	2020	—	—	—	—	—	—	—	—	—	—		Non-album single
"Mean" (with Snot)	2020	—	—	—	—	—	—	—	—	—	—	RIAA: Gold	Beautiful Havoc
"Roaring 20s"	2021	—	—	—	—	—	—	—	—	—	—		You Still Here, Ho?
"Back Pack (Flora The Explorer)"	2021	—	—	—	—	—	—	—	—	—	—		Non-album single
"Ice Baby"	2021	—	—	—	—	—	—	—	—	—	—		You Still Here, Ho?
"PBC"	2022	—	—	—	—	—	—	—	—	—	—		You Still Here, Ho?
"Conceited"	2022	—	—	—	—	—	—	—	—	—	—	RIAA: Gold	You Still Here, Ho?
"No Face"	2022	—	—	—	—	—	—	—	—	—	—		You Still Here, Ho?
"Conceited" (remix) (featuring Lola Brooke and Maiya the Don)	2023	—	—	—	—	—	—	—	—	—	—		You Still Here, Ho? (extended)
"Nasty Dancer"	2023	—	—	—	—	—	—	—	—	—	—		You Still Here, Ho? (extended)
"Rodeo" (remix) (with Lah Pat)	2023	— (Note: "Rodeo (Remix)" did not enter the Billboard Hot 100, but peaked at number 18 on the Bubbling Under Hot 100 chart.)	39	—	—	—	—	—	—	—	—	RMNZ: Gold	Non-album singles
"Einstein"	2023	—	—	—	—	—	—	—	—	—	—		Non-album singles
"Bed Time Remix" (featuring Monaleo and Gloss Up)	2023	—	—	—	—	—	—	—	—	—	—		You Still Here, Ho? (extended)
"No Love Shemix" (with Trina and Maiya The Don featuring J.K. Mac)	2023	—	—	—	—	—	—	—	—	—	—		Non-album singles
"Anything Flows" (featuring Maiya The Don, 2Rare, and Kari Faux)	2023	—	—	—	—	—	—	—	—	—	—		Non-album singles
"B.T.W."	2023	—	—	—	—	—	—	—	—	—	—		Non-album singles
"Flo Milli"	2023	—	—	—	—	—	—	—	—	—	—		Non-album singles
"Fruit Loop"	2023	—	—	—	—	—	—	—	—	—	—		Non-album singles
"Chocolate Rain"	2023	—	—	—	—	—	—	—	—	—	—		Non-album singles
"BGC"	2023	—	—	—	—	—	—	—	—	—	—		Non-album singles
"Never Lose Me"	2023	15	6	5	23	17	19	67	10	15	22	RIAA: Platinum; ARIA: Platinum; BPI: Platinum; MC: Platinum; RMNZ: 2× Platinum	Fine Ho, Stay
"Duh!"	2024	—	—	—	—	—	—	—	—	—	—		Non-album singles
"Wet Dreams" (featuring Coop and G)	2024	—	—	—	—	—	—	—	—	—	—		Non-album singles
"Why Lie?" (with Skepta)	2024	—	—	—	—	—	—	—	— (Note: "Why Lie?" did not enter the NZ Top 40 Singles Chart, but peaked at number 13 on the NZ Hot Singles Chart.)	74	—		Knife and Fork
"Perfect Person" (featuring Coop)	2025	—	—	—	—	—	—	—	—	—	—		Non-album singles
"Flo Jackson"	2026	—	—	—	—	—	—	—	—	—	—		Non-album singles
"Hot As Bic"	2026	—	—	—	—	—	—	—	—	—	—		Non-album singles
"—" denotes a recording that did not chart or was not released in that territory.

=== As featured artist ===
List of singles as featured artist, with selected chart positions and certifications, showing year released and album name
Title	Year	Peak chart positions				Certifications	Album
Title	Year	US	US R&B /HH	US Rap	NZ Hot	Certifications	Album
"Back It Up" (Trap Beckham featuring Flo Milli)	2020	—	—	—	—		Make America Shake Again
"Cherry" (remix) (Almondmilkhunni featuring Flo Milli)	2020	—	—	—	—		Non-album singles
"F'd Up" (Savannah Cristina featuring Flo Milli)	2020	—	—	—	—		Non-album singles
"Boys Ain't Shit" (Saygrace featuring Flo Milli)	2020	—	—	—	—		Non-album singles
"Sexy" (Joeville featuring Flo Milli)	2020	—	—	—			Non-album singles
"Plain" (Benee featuring Lily Allen and Flo Milli)	2020	—	—	—	13		Hey U X
"I Am" (Baby Tate featuring Flo Milli)	2020	—	— (Note: "I Am" did not enter Billboard Hot R&B/Hip-Hop Songs, but peaked at number 15 on R&B/Hip-Hop Digital Song Sales.)	— (Note: "I Am" did not enter Billboard Hot Rap Songs, but peaked at number 9 on Rap Digital Song Sales.)	29	RIAA: Gold	After the Rain
"Better Be" (Big Freedia featuring Flo Milli)	2020	—	—	—	—		Big Freedia's Smokin' Santa Christmas
"Element" (remix) (PJ featuring Flo Milli)	2020	—	—	—	—		Non-album single
"Nasty" (Rich the Kid featuring Latto, Rubi Rose, and Flo Milli)	2021	—	—	—	—		Lucky 7
"Clap for 'Em" (YungManny featuring Flo Milli and Sada Baby)	2021	—	—	—	—		Non-album singles
"Asthma Pump" (Tay Money featuring Flo Milli)	2021	—	—	—	—		Non-album singles
"Bundles 2" Kayla Nicole featuring Taylor Girlz and Flo Milli	2021	—	—	—	—		Non-album singles
"Raindrops" (GoldLink featuring Flo Milli)	2021	—	—	—	—		Non-album singles
"Simon Says" (Destiny Rogers featuring Flo Milli)	2021	—	—	—	—		Non-album singles
"Money" (Rico Nasty featuring Flo Milli)	2021	—	—	—	—		Non-album singles
"Toot It Up" (Sally Sossa featuring Flo Milli)	2022	—	—	—	—		Non-album singles
"We Not Humping" (remix) (Monaleo featuring Flo Milli)	2022	—	—	—	—	RIAA: Gold	Non-album singles
"Buying All Black" (Ludacris featuring Flo Milli and PJ)	2022	—	—	—	—		Non-album singles
"Whole Family" (Saucy Santana featuring Flo Milli)	2023	—	—	—	—		Non-album singles
"Take It Up" (remix) (DEELA featuring Flo Milli)	2023	—	—	—	—		Non-album singles
"Tomioka" (remix) (with Jay Eazy)	2023	—	—	—	—		Non-album singles
"Big Mad" (Icandy featuring Flo Milli)	2023	—	—	—	—		Non-album singles
"Expensive" (Maiya the Don featuring Flo Milli)	2024	—	—	—	—		Non-album singles
"Swag It!" (remix) (Chow Lee featuring Flo Milli)	2024	—	—	—	—		Sex Drive
"Sunday Service" (remix) (Latto featuring Megan Thee Stallion and Flo Milli)	2024	100	26	20	—		Sugar Honey Iced Tea
"Talk My Shit" (Childish Gambino featuring Amaarae and Flo Milli)	2024	—	—	—	—		Bando Stone & the New World
"Special" (Doe Boy featuring Skilla Baby and Flo Milli)	2024	—	—	—	—		Non–album singles
"Embrace It" (Ndotz featuring Sexyy Red and Flo Milli)	2024	—	—	—	—		Non–album singles
"Dirty Work" (Aespa featuring Flo Milli)	2025	—	—	—	—		Dirty Work
"Bruce Wayne" (Be First featuring Flo Milli & ATL Jacob)	2026	—	—	—	—		Watch Me
"—" denotes a recording that did not chart or was not released in that territory.

== Guest appearances ==
List of non-single guest appearances, with selected peak chart positions, year released, other artist(s) featured, and album name
Title	Year	Other artist(s)	Peak chart positions		Album
Title	Year	Other artist(s)	US	NZ Hot	Album
"Good"	2020	Yung Bleu, Yo Gotti	—	—	Bleu Vandross 3
"Goddess"	2023	Monaleo	—	—	Where the Flowers Don't Die
"Roc Steady"	2024	Megan Thee Stallion	—	38	Megan: Act II
"Dumb"	2025	Tyga, Big Sean	—	—	NSFW
"Bloodonmyhands"	2025	Tate McRae	64	—	So Close to What
"—" denotes a recording that did not chart or was not released in that territory.

== Music videos ==
=== As lead artist ===
List of music video appearances as lead artist with the associated album, directors, and other performers
Title	Year	Other performer(s)	Director	Album	Ref.
"Beef FloMix"	2019	—N/a	Celeste Li	Ho, Why Is You Here?	
"In The Party"	2019	—N/a	Celeste Li	Ho, Why Is You Here?	
"My Attitude"	2020	—N/a	Jetphynx	—N/a	
"Eat It Up"	2020	—N/a	Jetphynx	—N/a	
"Not Friendly" (animated video)	2020	—N/a	Jetphynx	Ho, Why Is You Here?	
"Like That Bitch"	2020	—N/a	Sara Lacombe	Ho, Why Is You Here?	
"Weak"	2020	—N/a	Sara Lacombe	Ho, Why Is You Here?	
"Send The Addy / May I"	2020	—N/a	Sara Lacombe	Ho, Why Is You Here?	
"Roaring 20s"	2021	—N/a	Child	You Still Here, Ho?	
"Back Pack (Flora The Explora)"	2021	—N/a	JVisuals312	—N/a	
"PBC"	2022	—N/a	Amber Park	You Still Here, Ho?	
"Conceited"	2022	—N/a	Nayip	You Still Here, Ho?	
"No Face"	2022	—N/a	Nayip	You Still Here, Ho?	
"Big Steppa"	2022	—N/a	Unknown	You Still Here, Ho?	
"B.T.W"	2023	—N/a	Myesha Gardner	—N/a	
"Flo Milli"	2023	—N/a	Unknown	—N/a	
"Fruit Loop"	2023	—N/a	Chandler Lass	—N/a	
"Hot Box"	2023	—N/a	Unknown	—N/a	
"BGC"	2023	—N/a	Boni Mata	—N/a	
"Never Lose Me"	2023	—N/a	Leff	Fine Ho, Stay	
"D's"	2024	—N/a	Rich Boy	—N/a	
"Understand" (vignette)	2024	—N/a	Unknown	—N/a	
"Neva" (vignette)	2024	—N/a	Unknown	—N/a	
"Clap Sum"	2024	—N/a	Unknown	Fine Ho, Stay	
"Got The Juice"	2024	—N/a	Unknown	Fine Ho, Stay	
"Toast"	2024	—N/a	Leff	Fine Ho, Stay	
"Wet Dreams"	2024	Coop, GG	Leff	—N/a	
"Why Lie?"	2024	Skepta	Hidji	Knife and Fork	

=== As featured artist ===
List of music video appearances as a featured artist with the associated album, directors, and other performers
Title	Year	Other performer(s)	Director(s)	Album	Ref.
"Mean"	2020	$not	Cole Bennett	Beautiful Havoc	
"Hot" (remix)	2020	Pia Mia and Sean Paul	Robin Antin and Mikey Minden	—N/a	
"Better Be"	2020	Big Freedia	Skyler Stroup	Big Freedia's Smokin' Santa Christmas	
"Nasty"	2021	Rich The Kid, Mulatto, and Rubi Rose	The Aunties	Lucky 7	
"I Am"	2021	Baby Tate	Andre Muir	After the Rain	
"Clap For 'Em"	2021	YungManny and Sada Baby	Unknown	—N/a	
"Asthma Pump"	2021	Tay Money	AJ Spitz and Josh Jones	—N/a	
"Money"	2021	Rico Nasty	Roxana Baldovin	—N/a	
"Toot It Up"	2022	Sally Sossa	Unknown	—N/a	
"We Not Humping" (remix)	2022	Monaleo	Chris Villa	—N/a	
"Rodeo"	2023	Lah Pat	Nayip Ramos	—N/a	
"Whole Family"	2023	Saucy Santana	Jasper Soloff	—N/a	
"Swag it!" (remix)	2024	Chow Lee	Nick Welch	—N/a	
"Sunday Service" (remix)	2024	Latto and Megan Thee Stallion	Unknown	Sugar Honey Iced Tea	
"Roc Steady"	2024	Megan Thee Stallion	Unknown	Megan: Act II	
"Embrace It" (remix)	2024	Ndotz and Sexyy Red	Alex & Tristan Demic, Don Prod	—N/a	
