= Putting Ya Dine =

2025 single by Monaleo

Single by Monaleo

from the album Who Did the Body
- Released: August 29, 2025
- Genre: Southern hip-hop
- Length: 3:37
- Label: Stomp Down; Columbia
- Songwriters: Leondra Gay; Jean Day Jr.; Thijs Netten
- Producers: Truebeatzz; Govsensei

Monaleo singles chronology
"I Can't Lie" (2025)	"Putting Ya Dine" (2025)	"Bolaji" (2025)

Music video
- "Putting Ya Dine" on YouTube

"Putting Ya Dine" is a song by American rapper Monaleo, released on August 29, 2025, as the lead single from her second studio album, Who Did the Body (2025). It was produced by Truebeatzz and Govsensei. An official remix featuring American rapper YoungBoy Never Broke Again was released on October 31, 2025.

== Composition ==
In the song, Monaleo raps with slurred delivery distinctive of a Houston accent and boastful lyrics.

== Remix ==
The remix of the song features YoungBoy Never Broke Again and was released on October 31, 2025. Prior to its release, Monaleo announced their collaboration when YoungBoy brought her out during his concert in Houston. Monaleo also mentioned the remix in a previous interview with Billboard, saying "That one happened very organically, and I'm excited because the timing feels right."

== Charts ==
Chart performance for "Putting Ya Dine"
Chart (2025)	Peak position
US Bubbling Under Hot 100 (Billboard)	8
US Hot R&B/Hip-Hop Songs (Billboard)	28
