= Kendell Freeman =

American music executive and artists

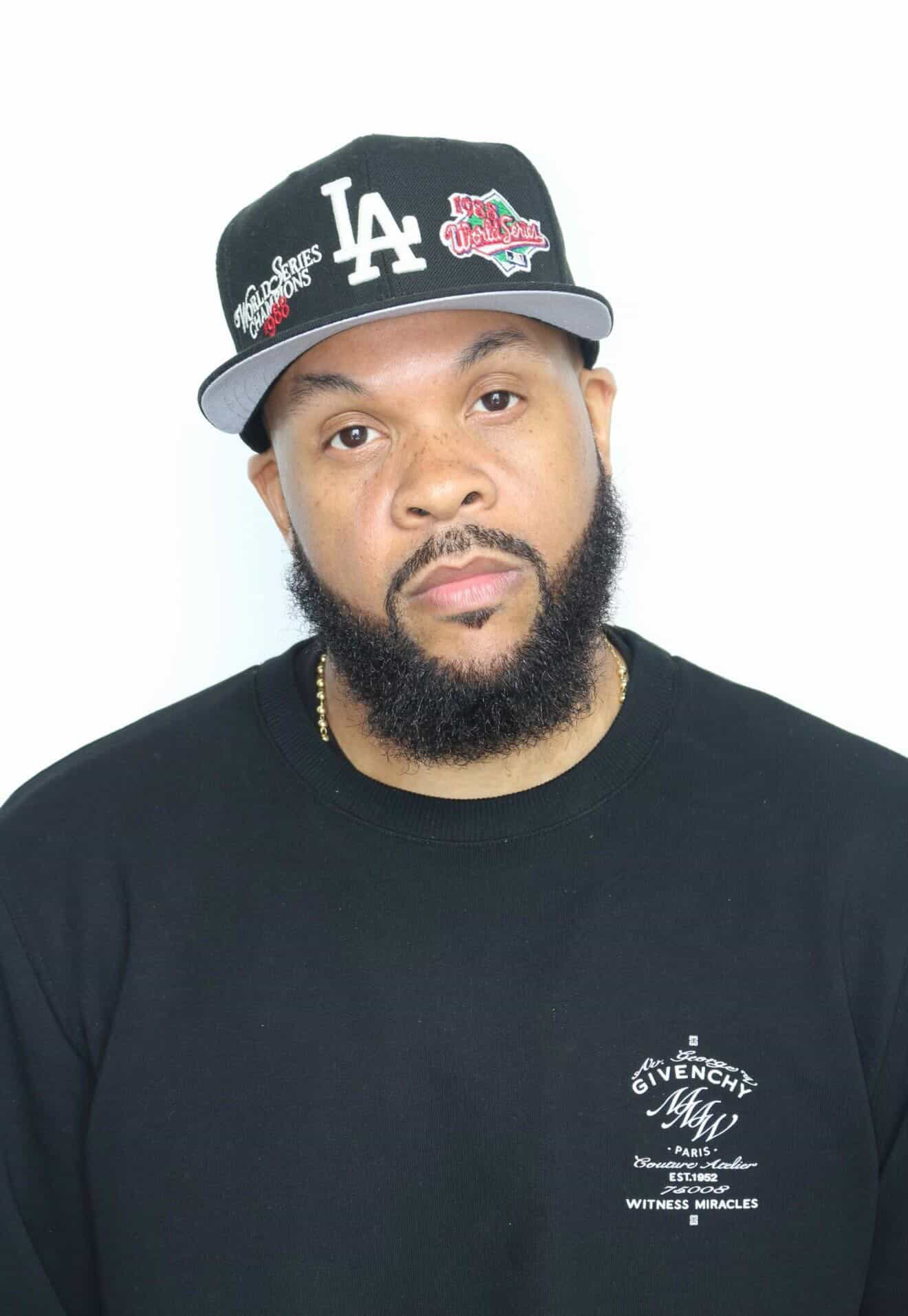
- Born: Harlem, New York City, U.S.
- Other names: Kendell "Sav" Freeman, Young Sav
- Education: Hampton University
- Occupations: Music executive, A&R
- Years active: 2004–present
- Known for: Lola Brooke Rick Ross Skylar Blatt
- Labels: Island; Def Jam; Maybach Music Group; Arista Records; Founder of Saint Ka$h Records
- Relatives: Fatman Scoop (brother)

Kendell Freeman, also known professionally as Kendell "Sav" Freeman or Young Sav, is an American music executive and artists and repertoire (A&R) specialist. He is the Senior Vice President of A&R at Arista Records and the founder of the joint-venture label Saint Kash Records. His career in the music industry includes roles as a mixshow manager at Def Jam Recordings and President/Vice President of Maybach Music Group (MMG). He is the brother of the late hip-hop artist Fatman Scoop (Isaac Freeman III).

== Early life and education ==
Kendell Freeman was born and raised in Harlem, a neighborhood in New York City. His older brother, Isaac Freeman III, achieved international commercial success as the hip-hop hype man and artist Fatman Scoop. The capital generated from his brother's early recording deals in the 1990s was used to fund Kendell's college education, facilitating his eventual entry into the corporate music industry.

== Career ==
=== Def Jam Recordings and Maybach Music Group ===
Freeman began his career as a mixshow manager at Def Jam Recordings. In this role, he coordinated the distribution of promotional singles to regional club DJs and radio programmers, helping to test and establish new urban music before broader national marketing campaigns. During his tenure at Def Jam, his promotional and operational work contributed to releases from artists such as Rick Ross, Fabolous, and Jeremih.

Following his time in radio promotion, he was appointed Vice President of Maybach Music Group (MMG), an imprint founded by rapper Rick Ross. At MMG, Freeman expanded his purview to include A&R oversight, the structuring of marketing campaigns, and logistical management for the label's artist roster. He provided executive administration for major releases, including A&R oversight (credited as MMG President) on Rick Ross's 2017 album Rather You Than Me.

=== Arista Records and Saint Kash ===
In 2021, Freeman was appointed vice president and Co-Head of Urban Music at Arista Records, a subsidiary of Sony Music Entertainment, working alongside label President David Massey and co-head Khris Riddick-Tynes.

Under his leadership, Arista signed Brooklyn rapper Lola Brooke following the viral success of her 2022 single "Don't Play With It." The sustained A&R strategy following her signing included multiple singles leading up to the release of her 2023 studio album Dennis Daughter, ultimately resulting in a Best New Artist nomination at the BET Awards.

Following Brooke's signing, Freeman brought his joint-venture label, Saint Kash Records, under the Arista umbrella. Through Saint Kash, he expanded the label's midwestern presence by signing and developing Cincinnati rapper Skylar Blatt. He facilitated collaborative releases for Blatt, notably the 2024 single "Wake Up" featuring Chris Brown. He has also been involved in the development of emerging artists such as Hurri Haran.

In May 2024, in recognition of his commercial achievements, Arista Records officially promoted Freeman to Senior Vice President of A&R.

== Selected discography and A&R credits ==
Throughout his tenures at Def Jam, MMG, and Arista, Freeman has been credited in executive capacities ranging from mixshow management to executive A&R:

- 2008: Rick Ross – Trilla (Mixshow / Promotions)
- 2009: Fabolous – Loso's Way (Label Operations)
- 2009: Jeremih – Jeremih (Label Operations)
- 2017: Rick Ross – Rather You Than Me (A&R oversight / MMG President)
- 2023: Lola Brooke – Dennis Daughter (A&R)
- 2024: Skylar Blatt – "Wake Up" feat. Chris Brown (A&R / Saint Kash)

== Industry influence ==
Freeman is a voting member of the XXL Awards Board, which determines the recipients of the publication's annual honors. He frequently participates in public panels discussing the music business, notably featuring as a panelist in the March 2023 SNIPES "Making History" series at the Apollo Theater.

In 2024, Billboard named Freeman to its annual R&B/Hip-Hop Power Players list, an industry audit of influential executives. The publication specifically highlighted his role in the commercial development of Lola Brooke.

== Civic work ==
Following the sudden death of his brother Fatman Scoop in August 2024, Freeman became the primary spokesperson for his family. He partnered with New York City Council Member Yusef Salaam and the Forever Fatman Scoop Foundation to spearhead a municipal street co-naming initiative in Harlem. The campaign successfully lobbied to legally designate the corner of 109th Street and 5th Avenue as "Isaac 'Fatman Scoop' Freeman III Place," with a public unveiling ceremony scheduled for August 9, 2025.
