= I'm a Piece of Shit =

Studio album by Father
- Released: March 25, 2016
- Genre: Hip-hop
- Label: Awful
- Producer: Father

Father chronology
Who's Gonna Get Fucked First? (2015)	I'm a Piece of Shit (2016)	Awful Swim (2018)

Professional ratings
Review scores
Source	Rating
HipHopDX	3.7/5
Pitchfork	7.7/10
PopMatters	8/10
RapReviews	7/10
Tiny Mix Tapes	3.5/5

I'm a Piece of Shit is the second studio album by American rapper Father. It was released on March 25, 2016 via Awful Records. Self-produced, it features guest appearances from iLoveMakonnen, ABRA, Archibald Slim, Ethereal, Micah Freeman, Stalin Majesty and Tommy Genesis. The album received generally favorable reviews from music critics.

== Track listing ==
No.	Title	Writer(s)	Length
1.	"Why Don't U?" (featuring Abra and iLoveMakonnen)	Centel Orlando Mangum; Gabrielle Olivia Mirville; Makonnen Kamali Sheran; Keith Charles	3:44
2.	"Lanes"	Mangum	3:38
3.	"Slide Thru" (featuring Stalin Majesty and Archibald Slim)	Mangum; Stalin Gillings; Tiwan Kelly	3:35
4.	"Big Emblem Benz"	Mangum	3:11
5.	"Fuck Up the Sheraton" (featuring Archibald Slim)	Mangum; Kelly	2:51
6.	"Slow Dance 2"	Mangum	1:52
7.	"Party on Me" (featuring iLoveMakonnen and Ethereal)	Mangum; Sheran; Ollie Rudolph	4:04
8.	"2 Girl Fantasy 2" (featuring Tommy Genesis)	Mangum; Genesis Mohanraj	2:23
9.	"Spit or Swallow" (featuring Micah Freeman)	Mangum; Micah Freeman	3:33
10.	"Up Still"	Mangum	3:15
11.	"Y U Make It Hurt Like This?"	Mangum	3:12
12.	"Why Don't U (Bobby Raps x KCSB Remix)" (featuring Abra and iLoveMakonnen)	Mangum; Mirville; Sheran; Charles	3:48

== Personnel ==
- Centel "Father" Mangum — vocals, producer, recording
- Makonnen "iLoveMakonnen" Sheran — vocals (tracks: 1, 7, 12)
- Gabrielle Olivia "Abra" Mirville — vocals (tracks: 1, 12)
- Tiwan "Archibald Slim" Kelly — vocals (tracks: 3, 5)
- Stalin "Majesty" Gillings — vocals (track 3)
- Ollie "Ethereal" Rudolph — vocals (track 7)
- Genesis Y. "Tommy Genesis" Mohanraj — vocals (track 8)
- Micah Freeman — vocals (track 9)
- Nate Donmoyer — mixing, mastering
