= You (Lola Brooke song) =

2023 single by Lola Brooke featuring Bryson Tiller

Single by Lola Brooke featuring Bryson Tiller

from the album Dennis Daughter
- Released: September 22, 2023
- Length: 2:41
- Label: Arista; Team80
- Songwriters: Shyniece Thomas; Bryson Tiller; Inga Marchand; Jean-Claude Olivier; Samuel Barnes; Shawn Carter
- Producers: Khris Riddick-Tynes; LilJuMadeDaBeat

Lola Brooke singles chronology
| "Off Top" (2023) | "You" (2023) | "Pit Stop" (2023) |

Bryson Tiller singles chronology
| "Down Like That" (2023) | "You" (2023) | "Never Lose Me" (2024) |

Music video
- "You" on YouTube

"You" is a song by American rapper Lola Brooke featuring American singer Bryson Tiller. It was released on September 22, 2023 via Arista Records and Team80 as the second single from her first studio album Dennis Daughter (2023). Produced by Khris Riddick-Tynes of The Rascals and LilJuMadeDaBeat, the song contains a sample of "Get Me Home" by Foxy Brown featuring Blackstreet.

== Background ==
With respect to the song's inspiration, Lola Brooke told Rated R&B:

I had to go big on this the Brooklyn way! I channeled my inner soft girl with a twist (laughs), but that balance is needed. There's more that meets the eyes and ears with me, and Fox is someone who paved the way for girls like me, so knowing that adds to the specialness of it all.

== Composition ==
The content of the song has been described as "sultry". Over drum production, Lola Brooke raps in gruff vocals and a "softer, intimate" flow different from her usual style, with sexually explicit lyrics as she describes an intimate moment with her partner. Bryson Tiller sings the chorus.

== Critical reception ==
The song received generally positive reviews. Tallie Spencer of HotNewHipHop wrote, "'You' exemplifies Lola Brooke's ability to switch between her high-energy mode, to producing music that has a chill soulful R&B melody. On the track, she delivers bars in her signature deep voice, the magnetic allure that first captivated listeners in the first place." Likewise, Shawn Grant of The Source commented the song "exudes sultriness and charm" and that the sample "showcases Lola Brooke's ability to craft multi-faceted hits that range from energetic, high-octane anthems to soulful melodies with an R&B flair." Robin Murray of Clash described the song as "super smooth, while also displaying Lola's tenacity." Tayo Odutola of Earmilk wrote, "The revamp has a soft drum groove and heightened melodic texture that fits perfectly with Bryson's distinct and highly infectious melodic runs".

== Music video ==
The music video was directed by Samuel McKnight and released alongside the single. It takes place in a massive residence. In the video, Lola Brooke sips champagne as she prances around a dressing room and Bryson Tiller is seen with a young lady on a balcony overlooking a beautiful scene, before the artists appear together on a glass stage over a pool. Later, Lola walks on a red carpet as the paparazzi takes photos of her, dressed in a gem-encrusted black dress. The clip also features a cameo from rapper Rob49. Two filming sets referenced rapper Lil' Kim's music videos, such as that of "Not Tonight" and "No Matter What They Say".

== Charts ==
Chart performance for "You"
| Chart (2023–2024) | Peak position |
|---|---|
| New Zealand Hot Singles (RMNZ) | 30 |
| US Rhythmic Airplay (Billboard) | 26 |

== Certifications ==
Certifications for "You"
| Region | Certification | Certified units/sales |
|---|---|---|
| United States (RIAA) | Gold | 500,000^{‡} |
^{‡} Sales+streaming figures based on certification alone.
