= Anycia =

American rapper (born 1997)

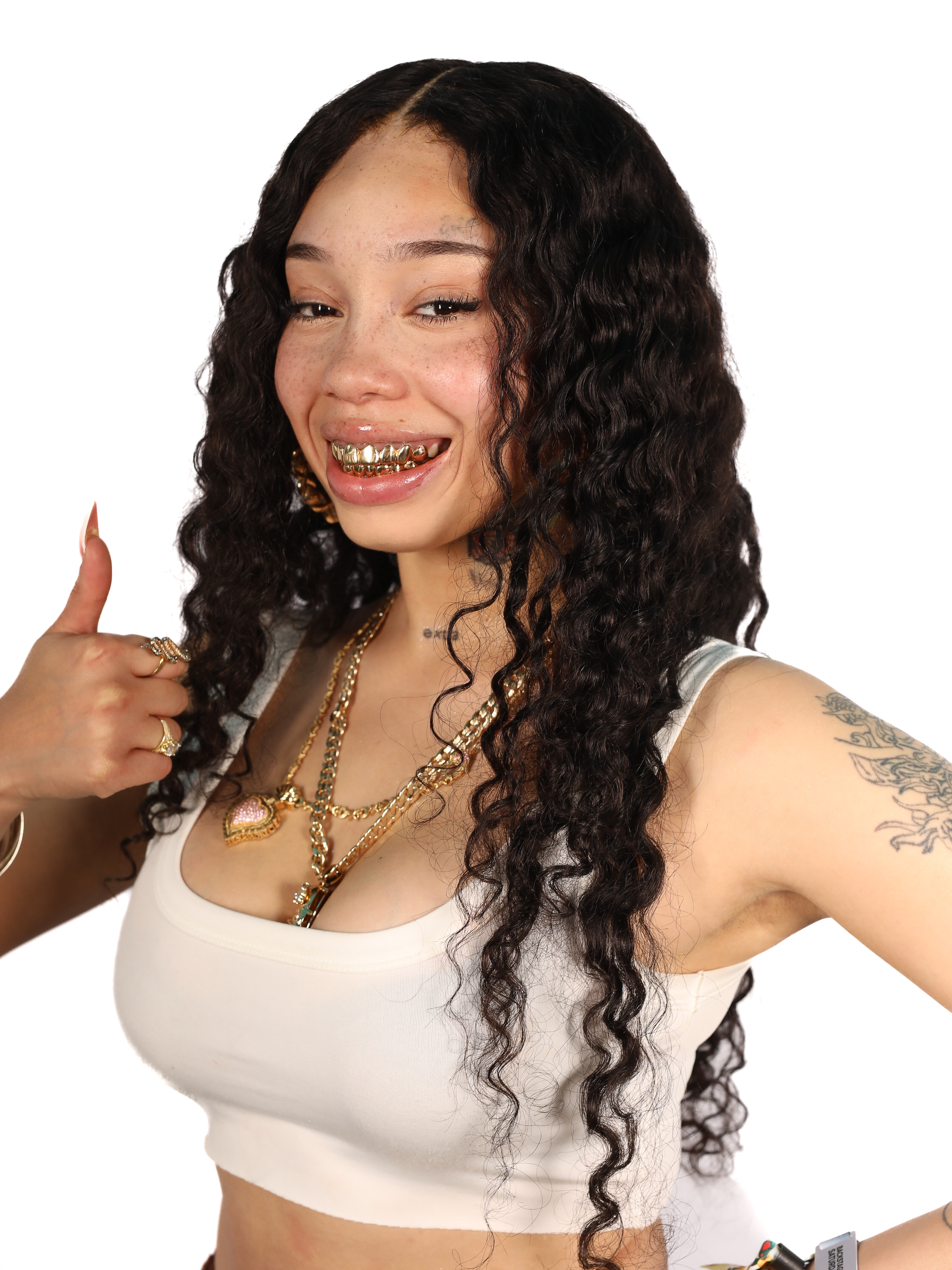
- Anycia in 2025

Background information
- Born: Anycia Symone Edwards; August 20, 1997 (age 29); Atlanta, Georgia, U.S.
- Genre: Trap
- Occupation: Rapper
- Instrument: Vocals
- Years active: 2022–present
- Partner: 4Batz (2025–present)

Anycia Symone Edwards (born August 20, 1997) is an American rapper. She began rapping professionally in 2022 and gained attention online when a snippet of her song "So What" went viral in 2023. She released her debut studio album, Princess Pop That, in 2024.

== Early life ==
Anycia Symone Edwards was born on August 20, 1997 in Atlanta, Georgia and raised on the city's South Side. She grew up in a Catholic household, raised by her mother, Andrea, and grandmother, Narvellette, alongside her younger brother. Her family lived in various parts of metro Atlanta. She is of Barbadian descent and has family ties to Los Angeles and New Orleans.

She began rapping at an early age and gave her first performance during an Easter concert at Landmark Christian School in Fairburn, Georgia, where she was selected to perform due to her outgoing nature. Her early musical influences included artists such as Usher, whom she listened to regularly with her mother.

Throughout her youth, Edwards attended multiple schools and spent her 10th-grade year at three different high schools, including two alternative schools programs after violating a school behavior contract. While in high school, she recorded her first song, "Queen of Atlanta," in an audio engineering class.

Edwards also spent a year living in New Orleans, where her family operated a mental health clinic. She has described the experience as formative, though marked by bullying from peers. Upon returning to Georgia, she briefly attended beauty school to pursue barbering, later working as a daycare teacher and restaurant hostess. She eventually left both jobs to pursue a career in music full-time.

== Career ==
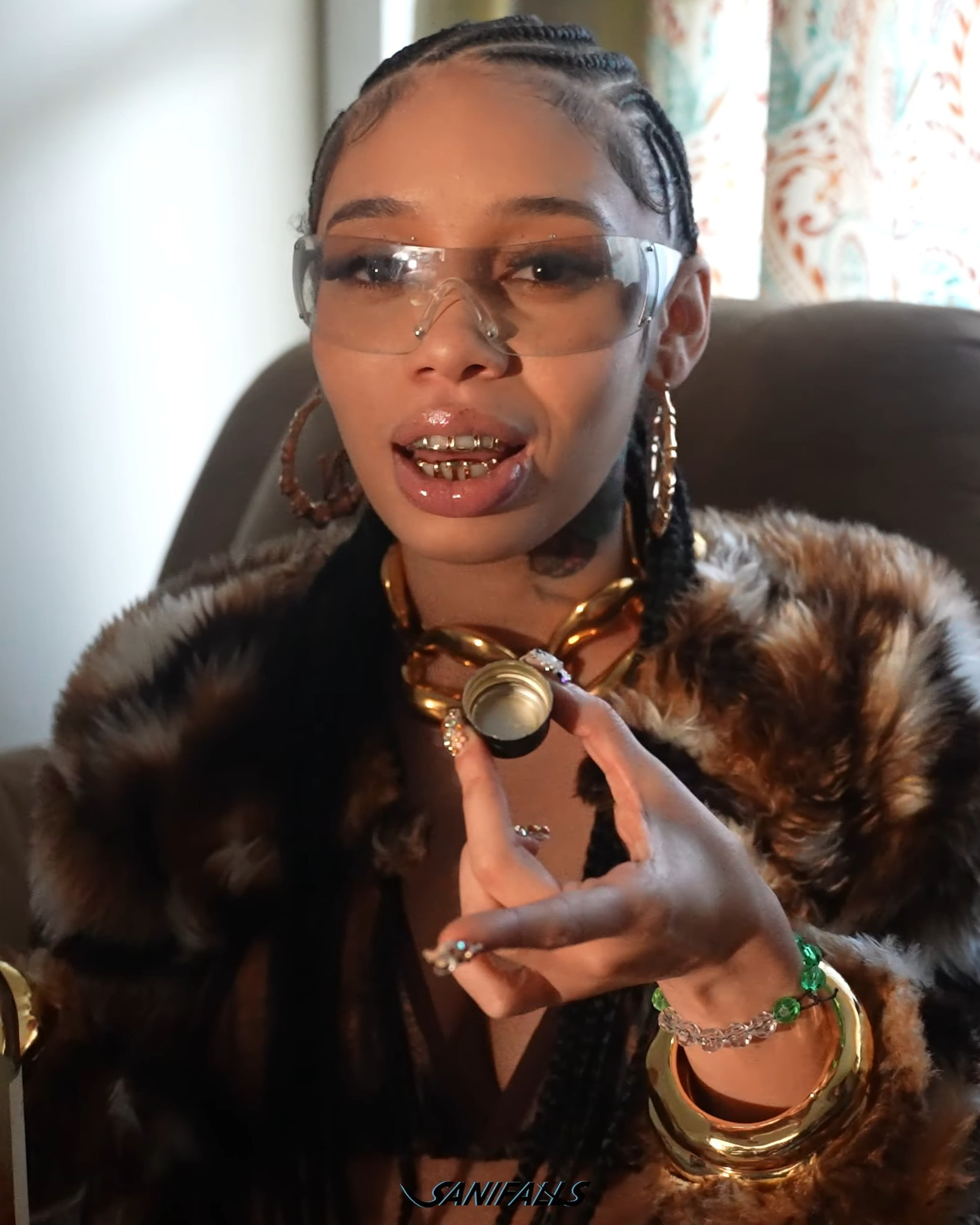
Anycia in an interview with WHTA in 2024

Inspired by a breakup, Anycia released her debut single, "Kimora Lee", in 2022. Her song "BRB" was released in summer 2023 with a music video, which was reposted by producer jetsonmade. He soon became a frequent collaborator of hers. She began to gain attention online, including from basketball player Kevin Durant and Drake, after posting a snippet of her song "So What", which samples the Field Mob song of the same name, in June 2023. She released her debut extended play, Extra, in November 2023 and, in late 2023, she toured with rapper Veeze on his Ganger Tour. Anycia released her song "Back Outside", which featured Latto, in January 2024. She was featured on the song "New Me" from Flo Milli's March 2024 studio album Fine Ho, Stay. Anycia's second studio album, Princess Pop That, was released on April 26, 2024 and preceded by the single "Bad Weather". For Pitchfork, Alphonse Pierre wrote that Princess Pop That was "more buttoned up" than her previous songs such as "So What". Anycia is scheduled to appear as a guest performer alongside Flo on Kehlani's Crash World Tour in late 2024. As of 2024, Anycia is independent and distributes her music through UnitedMasters.

== Musical style ==
Anycia's music is largely trap music. Her early music was melodic plugg in which her voice was Auto-Tuned. For Rolling Stone, Andre Gee described Anycia's voice as a "sultry", "smoky", and "entrancing baritone". Rosemary Apkin, for Grammy.com, wrote that her music displayed her "playful personality, unique vocal style and skillful flow". DeAsia Paige of the Atlanta Journal-Constitution opined that Anycia's music had a "laid-back confidence" and "braggadocios flair" with a "husky tone". Her rap flow was compared by Aaron Williams of Uproxx to that of Veeze, with him writing that she had a "conversational nonchalance bordering on laconic", while Kyle Denis of Billboard wrote that she had a "raspy, blasé tone" in her music. Hypebeast's Sarah Kearns detailed her rap style as "slower and casual" with "fun, witty bars and pop-leaning beats". Anycia has compared her alter ego, Princess Pop That, whose name was based on her Twitter and finsta username, to Beyoncé's alter ego Sasha Fierce.

== Personal life ==
In February 2025, she confirmed that she was in a relationship with American singer 4Batz.

== Discography ==
=== Studio albums ===
List of studio albums, with release date and label shown
Title	Details
Princess Pop That	Released: April 26, 2024; Label: Self-released; Format: Digital download, streaming

=== Extended plays ===
List of extended plays, with release date and label shown
Title	Details
Extra	Released: November 3, 2023; Label: Self-released; Format: Digital download, streaming

=== Singles ===
==== As lead artist ====
List of singles as lead artist, with selected chart positions, showing year released and album name
Title	Year	Peak chart positions	Album
Title	Year	US R&B/HH Air.	Album
"Kimora Lee"	2022	—	Non-album singles
"Delirious"	2022	—	Non-album singles
"Makin Em Dance"	2023	—	Non-album singles
"BRB"	2023	—	Extra and Princess Pop That
"Anycia"	2023	—	Non-album singles
"Refund"	2023	—	Non-album singles
"Splash Brothers" (with Karrahbooo)	2023	—	Princess Pop That
"Basic" (with EvilGiane and Robb Banks)	2023	—	#HeavensGate Vol. 1
"Back Outside" (featuring Latto)	2024	37	Princess Pop That
"Up, Lit"	2024	—	Princess Pop That
"Nene's Prayer"	2024	—	Princess Pop That
"Bad Weather"	2024	—	Princess Pop That
"I Did It" (with 9lives and Kanii)	2024	—	TBA
"Girls Gone Wild"	2024		TBA

==== As featured artist ====
List of singles as featured artist, showing year released and album name
Title	Year	Album
"Hot Outside" (Emotional Oranges featuring Anycia)	2024	TBA
"RichBoy" (22Daboat featuring Anycia)	2024	RichBoy
"Don Who Leo" (Blanco & Reposado remix) (Monaleo and Skilla Baby featuring Anycia)	2024	Non-album single
"Sun" (JID featuring Anycia)	2025	God Does Like Ugly

=== Guest appearances ===
List of guest appearances, with year, other artist(s), and album
Title	Year	Artist(s)	Album
"Say My Grace"	2023	Woo Da Savage	Villain
"New Me"	2024	Flo Milli	Fine Ho, Stay
"Wednesday in Cali"	2024	Big Bratt	The First Lady
"Playa"	2026	ASAP Rocky	Don't Be Dumb
