= We Not Humping =

2021 single by Monaleo

Single by Monaleo
- Released: December 3, 2021
- Genre: Southern hip hop
- Length: 2:24
- Label: Stomp Down
- Songwriters: Leondra Gay; Sebastian Baldeon; David Karbal
- Producers: Diablo; Aryay

Monaleo singles chronology
| "Show You Sum" (2021) | "We Not Humping" (2021) | "Serious" (2021) |

Music video
- "We Not Humping" on YouTube

Remix cover
- Cover art of the official remix featuring Flo Milli.

Flo Milli singles chronology
| "PBC" (2022) | "We Not Humping (Remix)" (2022) | "Conceited" (2022) |

Music video
- "We Not Humping (Remix)" on YouTube

"We Not Humping" is a single by American rapper Monaleo, released on December 3, 2021. It was produced by Diablo and Aryay. An official remix of the song featuring American rapper Flo Milli was released on April 21, 2022.

== Composition ==
The song centers around Monaleo rejecting a man who wants to be in a sexual relationship with her, in a blunt and confident manner. She raps over a southern hip hop beat.

== Music video ==
The music video was released on January 13, 2022. Directed by Dell Nie and Ashley Monae, it sees Monaleo and her boyfriend, rapper Stunna 4 Vegas, throwing a house party that disturbs one of her neighbors.

== Remix ==
The remix of the song, featuring Flo Milli, was released on April 21, 2022. It finds Monaleo and Flo Milli outlining their rules for their respective romantic interests. A music video for the remix was directed by Chris Villa and released on May 5, 2022. It has been described as a "vibrant", "candy-colored" visual.

== Certifications ==
| Region | Certification | Certified units/sales |
|---|---|---|
| United States (RIAA) | Gold | 500,000^{‡} |
^{‡} Sales+streaming figures based on certification alone.
