= Lola Brooke =

American rapper (born 1994)

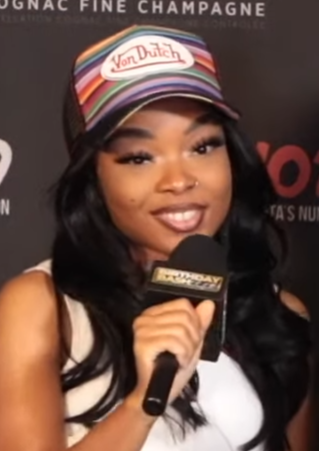
- Lola Brooke in 2023

Background information
- Also known as: Big Gator
- Born: Shyniece Deneen Thomas; February 1, 1994 (age 32); Brooklyn, New York City, U.S.
- Genre: East Coast hip-hop
- Occupation: Rapper
- Years active: 2016–present
- Labels: Team80; Arista

Shyniece Deneen Thomas (born February 1, 1994), better known by her stage name Lola Brooke, is an American rapper. Born and raised in Brooklyn, she is best known for her 2021 single "Don't Play with It", which gained popularity on Twitter and TikTok the following year. She signed with Arista Records in 2023.

== Life and career ==
Shyniece Thomas was born on February 1, 1994 in Bedford–Stuyvesant, Brooklyn, where she was also raised. She is an only child and was raised by her mother, a widow. Inspired to learn how to rap by the premiere of the music video for 50 Cent's 2002 song "Wanksta", Lil Wayne's song "Cannon" from his 2006 mixtape Dedication 2, and Meek Mill, she started making music in 2016 with her cousin, Jah, who learned how to make beats using Pro Tools. She worked as a residential aide at a shelter until 2017, when she quit her job to pursue a music career.

Brooke signed with Team 80 Productions in 2016. She released her breakout single "Don't Play with It" in 2021. Her first song went viral on Twitter before subsequently getting popular on TikTok and Instagram. Brooke was signed by Record Executive Kendell Freeman to Arista Records. In January 2023 and was an opening act on A Boogie wit da Hoodie's Me v. Myself Tour throughout early 2023. Her song "So Disrespectful" and a remix of "Don't Play with It", the latter of which featured American rappers Latto and Yung Miami, were both released in March 2023. Also that month, she made a cameo on an episode of the CBS television series East New York.

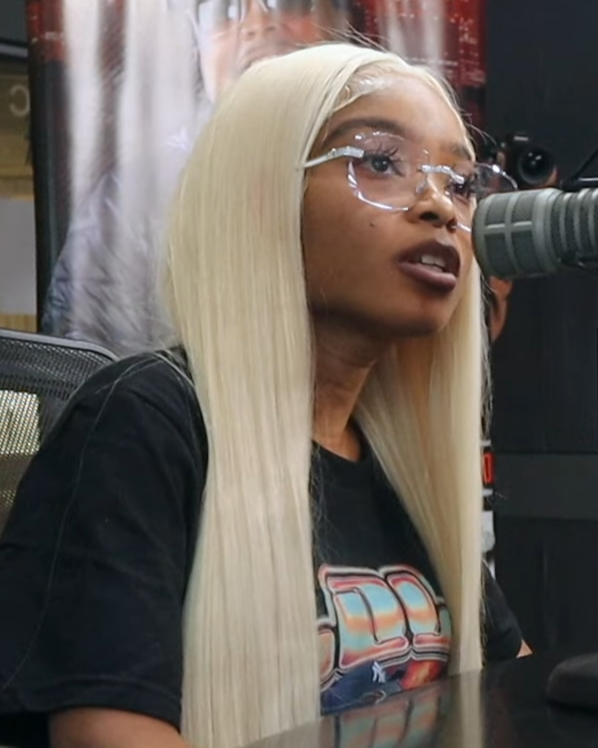
Brooke in an interview with WHTA in 2023

Brooke was featured on the Girls Mix version of Ciara's song "Da Girls", alongside Ciara and Lady London, released on April 14, 2023. An official music video was released on the same day. In June, she was selected as 2023 XXL Freshmen Class. Her debut studio album, Dennis Daughter, was released on November 10, 2023.

== Musical style ==
Brooke's music is hip hop. Her stage name is a combination of the names of the Looney Tunes character Lola Bunny and Brooklyn. She has listed her biggest influences on her music as Meek Mill, Lil Wayne, 50 Cent, Foxy Brown, DMX and Lil' Kim and she refers to herself by the nickname Big Gator.

== Discography ==
=== Studio albums ===
Title	Album details
Dennis Daughter	Released: November 10, 2023; Label: Arista, Team80; Format: Digital download, streaming

=== Singles ===
==== As lead artist ====
List of singles, with year released, selected chart positions, and album name shown
Title	Year	Peak chart positions			Certifications	Album
Title	Year	US	US R&B/ HH	NZ Hot	Certifications	Album
"Bipolar"	2018	—	—	—		Non-album singles
"Not the Same"	2018	—	—	—		Non-album singles
"Boy!"	2019	—	—	—		Non-album singles
"Cash Out"	2019	—	—	—		Non-album singles
"Shittin' Me?	2020	—	—	—		Non-album singles
"Options"	2020	—	—	—		Non-album singles
"My Bop"	2020	—	—	—		Non-album singles
"Back to Business"	2021	—	—	—		Non-album singles
"Don't Play with It" (featuring Billy B or Latto and Yung Miami)	2021	69	21	—	RIAA: Platinum	Dennis Daughter
"Dummy Ummy"	2021	—	—	—		Non-album singles
"On My Mind"	2022	—	—	—		Non-album singles
"Fire in the Booth Pt. 1"	2022	—	—	—		Non-album singles
"Gator Season"	2022	—	—	—		Non-album singles
"Here I Come"	2022	—	—	—		Non-album singles
"So Disrespectful"	2023	—	—	—		Non-album singles
"Blind Em"	2023	—	—	—		The PixTape EP
"Just Relax"	2023	—	—	—		Non-album single
"Life's on the Line"	2023	—	—	—		Non-album single
"You" (featuring Bryson Tiller)	2023	—	—	30	RIAA: Gold	Dennis Daughter
"Pit Stop" (featuring French Montana)	2023	—	—	—		Dennis Daughter

==== As featured artist ====
List of singles, with year released, selected chart positions, and album name shown
Title	Year	Album
"Jaquae" (Just You and I featuring Lola Brooke)	2018	Chapter 3
"Side Nigga" (Lyrivelli featuring Lola Brooke)	2018	HiiiBriiid
"It's for Me" (OT9 Beno featuring Lola Brooke)	2021	Non-album singles
"Opp" (Coach Joey featuring Lola Brooke)	2022	Met Her In New York
"Conceited" (Flo Milli featuring Lola Brooke and Maiya the Don)	2023	You Still Here, Ho? (Extended)
"Shabooya (Remix)" (Gloss Up, K Carbon, Slimeroni, Aleza, and Hitkidd featuring Lola Brooke)	2023	Non-album singles
"Da Girls (Girls Mix)" (Ciara featuring Lola Brooke and Lady London)	2023	Non-album singles
"Automobooty" (NLE Choppa featuring Lola Brooke and Modesty)	2023	Cottonwood 2
"Petty" (Liana Banks featuring Cleotrapa & Lola Brooke)	2023	Non-album singles
"Bad Bitches (Remix)" (BreezyLYN featuring Kali and Lola Brooke)	2023	Hood Mona Lisa
"Yeah Yeah" (Juiicy 2xs featuring Lola Brooke)	2023	Non-album singles
"Dumb" (Doe Boy featuring Lola Brooke)	2023	Beezy
"No Angels" (Coi Leray featuring Lola Brooke)	2023	Coi
"Off Top" (Rican da Menace featuring Lola Brooke)	2023	Non-album singles
"Curious (Remix)" (Eric Bellinger featuring Lil' Kim and Lola Booke)	2023	Non-album singles
"Beama" (Shenseea featuring Lola Brooke)	2023	Non-album singles

== Awards and nominations ==
Award	Year	Nominee	Category	Result	Ref.
BET Awards	2023	Herself	Best New Artist	Nominated	
BET Hip Hop Awards	2023	Herself	Best Breakthrough Hip-hop Artist	Nominated	
