= You Still Here, Ho? =

Studio album by Flo Milli
- Released: July 20, 2022 March 24, 2023
- Genres: Trap; bounce; hip-hop
- Length: 41:04
- Labels: '94 Sounds; RCA
- Producers: Beatsbyslade; Brad!; brettonthebeat; Big Korey; Bizness Boi; BRYVN; Caston; Derelle Rideout; Deux Twins; DJ Montay; Doda1k; Dr. Luke; DTP; FRANKIE XY; Gitty; Kenny Beats; OG Parker; Oogway; Reese Laflare; Rickey Carley; Romano; Sophie Gray; Tasha Catour; Young Fyre

Flo Milli chronology
Ho, Why Is You Here? (2020)	You Still Here, Ho? (2022)	Fine Ho, Stay (2024)

Singles from You Still Here, Ho?
- 1. "Roaring 20s" Released: January 15, 2021; 2. "Ice Baby" Released: October 29, 2021; 3. "PBC" Released: February 25, 2022; 4. "Conceited" Released: June 17, 2022; 5. "No Face" Released: July 12, 2022; 6. "Conceited (Remix)" Released: January 27, 2023; 7. "Nasty Dancer (Remix)" Released: February 17, 2023; 8. "Bed Time (Remix) (Remix)" Released: March 23, 2023

You Still Here, Ho? is the debut studio album by American rapper Flo Milli. It was released on July 20, 2022, by '94 Sounds and RCA Records. It is the follow-up to her major-label debut mixtape, Ho, Why Is You Here? (2020), and was itself followed up by her sophomore studio album Fine Ho, Stay (2024).

== Background and release ==
On June 17, Flo Milli released the single "Conceited" and announced the title of the album. The album's release date of July 22 was revealed alongside a new track, "No Face", which was produced by Tasha Catour.

On July 19, Flo Milli released the 15 song track list for You Still Here, Ho?, revealing features from Tiffany Pollard, Babyface Ray and Rico Nasty.

Originally planned for release on July 22, 2022, Flo Milli took to twitter to announce the album would release early on July 20, 2022 instead.

On March 24, 2023, she released an extended version of the album, featuring guest appearances from Lola Brooke, Maiya The Don, Gloss Up, and Monaleo.

== Music and lyrics ==
Flo Milli uses the image of Tiffany Pollard in her raps, making listeners feel that "the main character of a reality show made a hip-hop album." "Conceited" is a "thudding Southern revamp of Remy Ma’s 2006 classic" with Milli rapping, “Please don't bark cause Milli bite back.”

== Critical reception ==
Professional ratings
Review scores
Source	Rating
Pitchfork	7.3/10
Rhythmer	3.5/5 stars

Clarissa Brooks of Pitchfork wrote that You Still Here, Ho? is "her most adventurous form yet." Hwang Duha of Rhythmer commented that "the music itself is not special", but Flo Milli "balances this out with completeness and unique concept." Writing for The Line of Best Fit, John Amen gave the album 7/10 and commented, "You Still Here, Ho? runs the fundamentals of hip-hop – aggression, wit, violent diarism, and primitivistic sounds – through a contemporary filter largely defined by social media and selfie culture."

== Track listing ==
You Still Here, Ho? track listing
No.	Title	Writer(s)	Producer(s)	Length
1.	"Intro HBIC (Tiffany Pollard Speaks)"	Tamia Carter		0:17
2.	"Come Outside"	Carter; Korey Roberson; Randy Reid, Jr.; Russell Wright	Big Korey; Doda1k	2:16
3.	"Bed Time"	Carter; Tramaine Winfrey	Young Fyre	2:48
4.	"Hottie" (featuring Babyface Ray)	Carter; Marcellus Register; Andre Carnell Robertson; Derelle Rideout; Maurice Thaddeus Williams; Carlton Mahone, Jr.; Teddy Riley	Bizness Boi; Rideout; Reese Laflare	3:01
5.	"Conceited"	Carter; Winfrey; Nicholaus Joseph Williams; Marcos Palacios	Young Fyre	2:27
6.	"PBC"	Carter; Winfrey; N. J. Williams	Young Fyre	2:34
7.	"Pretty Girls"	Carter; Joshua Isaih Parker; Rickie Carley; Terence Williams; Francisco Bejar; Bryan Yepes; Joshua Baker; André Benjamin; Antwan Patton; Robert Hazard	OG Parker; Carley; Romano; FRANKIE XY; BRYVN	2:18
8.	"Do It Better"	Carter; Brigitte Navarette; Jaimie Navarette; Denis Raab; Baker	Deux Twins; DTP	2:37
9.	"No Face"	Carter; Latasha Williams; Baker; Treonsha Turner; Dareese Smith; Clay West; Alexander Lloyd	Tasha Catour	3:09
10.	"On My Nerves"	Carter; Jeff Gitelman; Caston Grigsby; Derrick Carrington Gray	Gitty; Caston	3:16
11.	"Big Steppa"	Carter; Lukasz Gottwald; Baker	Dr. Luke	2:27
12.	"Pay Day" (featuring Rico Nasty)	Carter; Maria-Cecilia Simone Kelly; Sophie Grajcer	Sophie Gray	2:44
13.	"F.N.G.M."	Carter; Roberson; Montay Humphrey; Wright; Camille Freeman; Darryl Mosley; Christopher Wallace; Kimberly Jones; Lamont Juarez Porter; Roy Ayers; Sylvia Striplin; James Bedford, Jr.	Big Korey; DJ Montay	1:54
14.	"Tilted Halo"	Carter; L. Williams	Tasha Catour	3:58
15.	"Outro (I Love New York)"	Carter		0:14

Bonus tracks
No.	Title	Writer(s)	Producer(s)	Length
16.	"Roaring 20s"	Carter; Kenneth Blume III; Sheldon Harnick; Jerry Bock	Kenny Beats	2:09
17.	"Ice Baby"	Carter; Bradley Powell; Brett Clarey; Earl Patrick Taylor; Eshan Patel; Malik Hargis	Brad!; brettonthebeat; Oogway; Beatsbyslade	2:49
Total length:				41:04

Extended edition
No.	Title	Writer(s)	Producer(s)	Length
18.	"Conceited" (featuring Lola Brooke and Maiya The Don)	Maiya Early; Palacios; N. Williams; Shyniece Thomas; Carter; Winfrey	Young Fyre	3:15
19.	"Nasty Dancer"	Carter; Parker	OG Parker	2:17
20.	"Bed Time" (featuring Monaleo and Gloss Up)	Carter; Winfrey; Jerrica Russel; Leondra Roshawn Gay	Young Fyre	3:40
Total length:				50:17

=== Sample credits ===
- "Bed Time" contains an uncredited sample of "She's a Bitch" written by Missy Elliott and Timbaland, and performed by Elliott.
- "Pretty Girls" interpolates "Girls Just Want to Have Fun" written by Robert Hazard and performed by Cyndi Lauper.
- "F.N.G.M." samples "Get Money" by Junior M.A.F.I.A., written by Christopher Wallace, Kimberly Jones, and Lamont Juarez Porter, which samples "You Can't Turn Me Away" written by Roy Ayers, Sylvia Striplin, and James Bedford, Jr., and performed by Striplin.
- "Roaring 20s" contains a sample of "If I Were a Rich Man" from the 1971 musical, Fiddler on the Roof, written by Sheldon Harnick and Jerry Bock, and performed by Chaim Topol.
