= Maiya the Don =

American rapper and songwriter

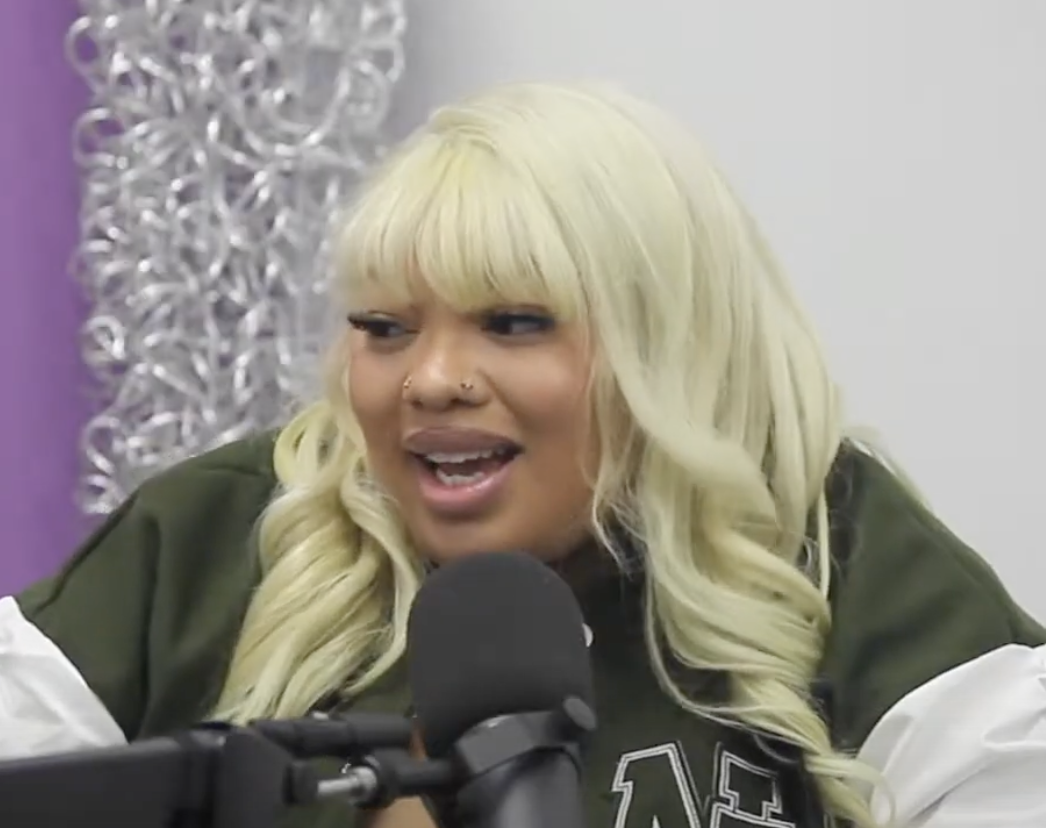
- Maiya The Don in 2022

Background information
- Born: Maiya Earley; March 15, 2002 (age 24); New York City, U.S.
- Genres: Hip hop
- Occupations: Rapper; songwriter
- Years active: 2022–present
- Label: RCA

Maiya Earley, known professionally as Maiya the Don, is an American rapper and songwriter. She is best known for her song "Telfy".

== Life and career ==
Maiya Earley was born in Brooklyn, New York. She enjoyed rapping from her youth and would battle rap with her brother. Using the name Maiya The Don, she initially used TikTok to produce beauty related content. In 2022, when she had approximately 500,000 followers, she shifted to making and releasing rap music. She gained notice on the platform for the songs "Chiraq" and "222."

Her breakout single "Telfy" was released in October 2022, and garnered approximately one million views on YouTube. The song refers to the popular shopping handbag from the luxury brand Telfar.

In January 2023, she and fellow Brooklyn rapper Lola Brooke were featured artists on the remix of the song "Conceited" by Flo Milli. Maiya performed at MEFeater's Galentine's show at New York Fashion Week. In March 2023, she was selected by TikTok as an inaugural Visionary Voices honoree to celebrate their #WomeninHipHop campaign. Maiya the Don was a supporting performer on Flo Milli's Thanks For Coming Here, Ho tour in late 2023.

She released her debut album Hot Commodity under RCA on October 6, 2023.

In 2024, she was selected for the XXL Freshman Class of 2024.

On June 26, 2026, she released her second album "Precious Cargo".
