= Beating Down Yo Block =

2021 single by Monaleo

Single by Monaleo

from the album Where the Flowers Don't Die
- Released: February 24, 2021
- Genre: Hip hop
- Length: 3:12
- Label: Stomp Down
- Songwriters: Leondra Gay; Demerion Pratt
- Producer: Merion Krazy

Monaleo singles chronology
"Get Wide" (2021)	"Beating Down Yo Block" (2021)	"She That Bihh Remix" (2021)

Music video
- "Beating Down Yo Block" on YouTube

"Beating Down Yo Block" is a song by American rapper Monaleo, released on February 24, 2021 as the lead single from her debut studio album Where the Flowers Don't Die (2023). Considered her breakout hit, it was produced by Merion Krazy and samples "Knocking Pictures Off Da Wall" by Yungstar featuring Lil Flex.

== Background and promotion ==
At the time that the song was created, Monaleo was recovering from a traumatic breakup with an abusive boyfriend. She composed the song to vent out her frustrations, in an attempt to restore her hope, confidence and optimism. Merion Krazy first sent her the beat for the song, which she recorded over, and they were both satisfied with the final result. She was certain that the song would be a hit immediately after writing it.

In September 2020, Monaleo posted a snippet of the song on Instagram, and it went viral there and on Twitter. She was initially unable to release the song due to an uncleared sample of "Knocking Pictures Off Da Wall", but it was cleared after months of negotiation, helped by the track going viral again in January 2021.

== Content ==
The song finds Monaleo rapping about refusing to be taken advantage of, fighting in certain situations, and taking men from other women. In one notable line, she compares passing men around to tossing beanbags. She also addresses her ex-boyfriend with the lyrics, "Don't ask me 'bout my ex, let's just pretend that nigga died".

== Critical reception ==
The song received generally positive reviews. Robby Seabrook III of XXL attributed its popularity to the "edge, clever lines" and confidence displayed in the song. Robyn Mowatt of Okayplayer wrote "What makes 'Beating Down Yo Block' work is how skillfully she throws out narrative-focused rhymes that paint a picture of jealous women and unworthy men, all while flipping patriarchy on its head. The boastful approach she takes inducts her into the current class of female rappers from the South who are thriving and impacting the rap industry." Pitchfork considered "Beating Down Yo Block" a candidate for the 2021 Song of the Summer and included it in their list of the 38 best rap songs of 2021.

== Certifications ==
Region	Certification	Certified units/sales
United States (RIAA)	Gold	500,000^{‡}
^{‡} Sales+streaming figures based on certification alone.
