= Savannah Cristina =

American singer

- Born: Savannah Cristina; April 3, 1997 (age 29); Miami, Florida, U.S.
- Education: Stranahan High School; Florida International University
- Genres: Neo-soul; R&B
- Occupation: Singer
- Instrument: Vocals
- Years active: 2016–present
- Label: TheNuMiami Warner Records Dollaz N Dealz Savannah Cristina Music
- Website: savannahcristinamusic.com

Savannah Cristina is an American singer from Fort Lauderdale, Florida. In 2019, she received widespread attention when a YouTube video performance of her song "Self Care" went viral. In 2020, she released her major label debut, Self Care, on Warner Records.

== Early life ==
Savannah Cristina was born in Miami, Florida, and was raised by an Africa-American father and a Dominican mother. She moved to Fort Lauderdale at the age of six. In 2019, she told Miami New Times: "I was raised by my church. I was raised by my school. I was raised by my Boys & Girls Club. I was really raised by the poetry teachers who took their time to invest in my art. All of those people created the woman I am today." She attended Stranahan High School, and graduated from Florida International University with a degree in political science.

== Career beginnings ==
Cristina began singing in church as well as at local community events. She told American Songwriter that she discovered her love of music in second grade when a choir teacher told her she had a gift. In high school, she started a poetry club and participated in slam competitions, studying performers like Aja Monet and Bertrand Boyd. In April 2016, she did a joint venture with the management company TheNuMiami, which posted her first single, "Spend It on Me," on SoundCloud. However, after her release of the self-care ep Savannah Cristina decided to stand firm on being independent in order to continue having creative direction. In 2021, Cristina hosted her own eight-city tour fully funded by her own label. After selling out in cities including D.C. and Atlanta, she was inspired to get back in the studio and release more music for her fans.

In 2017, she released Mango Season. The title, she told The PoPular Society in 2017, was inspired by the mango trees that bloom in Fort Lauderdale every summer. The following year, she released Florida Girl. She also collaborated with South Florida artists such as Twelve'Len, ¡Mayday!, and Ice Billion Berg, and contributed backing vocals to a track on Denzel Curry's 2018 album Ta13oo.

In 2019, Savannah Cristina signed a record deal with Dollaz N Dealz. She posted videos of herself performing around her neighborhood, including a basketball court (for “Rebound”) and a busy intersection (for “Belong to the Streets”). She told Rated R&B, "I got to a point where I wanted people to see what I'm doing, and if that means I have to go out into the street or go into the middle of the beach or go to a basketball court, I'm going to get your attention. So, that's where the inspiration came from. I came up with the idea myself and I love the way everybody accepted the way that they did." She told Flaunt: "All these spots I pick are places from my childhood. The basketball court, I grew up going to that court playing with my dad. That street is the street I caught the city bus to go to school."

Her "Self Care" video was filmed at a local beach. It went viral and eventually garnered 6 million views. She told Yahoo! Life that she was motivated to make the clip because "I felt like I was neglecting myself. I felt like as a woman, as a person, I was neglecting my feelings [and] my responsibilities that I had to myself."

Warner Records began courting her after she released her single "What You Won't Do", and partnered with her in January 2020 to release her Self Care EP on October 2, 2020.

In 2022, she independently released her single "Bad Bitch Energy", which immediately went viral on TikTok and Instagram catching the attention of prominent public figures. This resulted in joining a 16-city tour with Arin Ray in October of that year.

== Style ==
Savannah Cristina has called her music "soul therapy" and "pieces of my diary". Her influences include Beyoncé, Jill Scott, Erykah Badu, PartyNextDoor and Lauryn Hill.

She told American Songwriter, "There's no other setting for me to talk about these things," she says. "I'm somebody that, if you know me, I'm very distant. I dissociate myself from emotions for as long as I can. I don't like saying what's wrong or talking about myself very much. But in music, I can express a side of myself that's very open, very emotional. Even if it's embarrassing or too personal. I almost have to do it."

== Discography ==
=== EPs ===
Title	Album details
Self Care	Released: October 2, 2020; Label: Dollaz N Dealz, Warner Records; Format: Digital Download

=== Independent projects ===
Title	Album details
Faded	Released: January 31, 2017; Label: TheNuMiami; Format: Digital Download
Mango Season	Released: July 31, 2017; Label: TheNuMiami; Format: Digital Download
Florida Girl	Released: October 5, 2018; Label: TheNuMiami; Format: Digital Download

=== Singles ===
List of singles as lead artist, showing year released and album name
Title	Year	Album
"Spend It on Me"	2016	Florida Girl
"Trust"	2016	Florida Girl
"Florida Boy"	2017	Florida Girl
"Florida Boy (Remix)" (feat. Ice Billion Berg)	2018	Florida Girl
"Midnight"	2018	Florida Girl
"SoulTies (Remix)"	2019	Non-album single
"What You Won't Do"	2019	Non-album single
"One Night Only"	2019	Non-album single
"Rebound"	2019	Non-album single
"Self Care"	2019	Self Care
"Belong to the Streets"	2019	Non-album single
"Selfish 2020"	2020	Non-album single
"Comfortable"	2020	Non-album single
"F'ed Up" (feat. Flo Milli)	2020	Non-album single
"First Time"	2020	Non-album single

=== Guest appearances ===
List of guest appearances with other performing artists, showing year released and album name
Title	Year	Other artist(s)	Album
"All Night Long"	2016	Twelve'len	Friends
"Have Someone"	2017	¡Mayday!	Search Party
"Addict"	2018	Gaby G	Breathe Me
"What I Want"	2018	Ice Billion Berg	Real Is Rare 2
"Night & Day"	2018	Lord Lu C N	The U Album
"Black Balloons"	2018	Denzel Curry	Ta13oo
"Good to You"	2018	Kaixen	N/A
"Heaven"	2018	Caleb Kai	N/A
"The Groove"	2018	Ice Billion Berg	On My Way
"Sticky Situation"	2019	Bushy B	Hbcu 2
"Close"	2019	¡Mayday!	The Thinnest Line, Pt. II
"Just Right for Me"	2019	Ice Billion Berg	On My Way
"Miami Nights"	2019	Lex Allen	N/A
"The Code"	2019	Marnino Toussaint, Purple Flux	N/A
"Change"	2019	Dante Alston	N/A
"Slide on You"	2019	DJ Screach	N/A
"Feel It"	2019	Sean Brady	N/A
"Robin"	2019	Marc.Made	N/A
"Against Love"	2020	Darkside Baybay	Famlay
"Pull Up"	2020	Jahfi Amt	N/A
