= Ethereal (musician) =

American rapper and record producer

- Also known as: Ethereal
- Born: Obie Rudolph; July 10, 1989 (age 37); Atlanta, Georgia, U.S.
- Genre: Soundcloud rap
- Occupations: Rapper; songwriter; record producer
- Years active: 2010s–present
- Label: Awful Records

Obie Rudolph (born July 10, 1989), known professionally as Ethereal, is an American rapper and record producer from Atlanta, Georgia. He is known as an early collaborator of American rapper Playboi Carti, who credits Rudolph with refining his sound.

== Early life ==
Obie Rudolph was born July 10, 1989, in Atlanta, Georgia. The rapper and producer was born with sacral agenesis, a condition that affects the development of the spine. Rudolph is disabled and uses a wheelchair.

== Career ==
=== Career beginnings ===
In an interview with The Fader, Ethereal stated that his interest in making music began at the age of 16. He was influenced to create music by many of his friends around him who wanted to pursue rapping. When he was around 18, he wanted to choose a name for himself after he decided to take music seriously. Looking through a dictionary, he found the word "Ethereal" choosing it as his moniker. Ethereal explained he chose the name because “it resonated with [him], and it just kind of became who [he is].” Ethereal's first EPs include a mix of the genres jungle and drum and bass.

=== Awful Records and production ===
In 2013, Ethereal met American rapper Playboi Carti through a mutual friend. Ethereal would later collaborate with Carti helping him develop his sound. His earliest collaboration with Playboi Carti was in 2014 with the track, "iknowuknow", on Cactus Jack. In 2015, he released "Beef" with Playboi Carti which became an influential SoundCloud rap song.

In July 2016, he produced a Playboi Carti freestyle titled "Pump Fake!”, the title referencing a pump fake. In September 2016, he released a collaboration EP with American rapper Archibald Slim titled Slum Beautiful. In December 2016, Ethereal and Playboi Carti released a single titled "Lemme Know".

Ethereal met American musician Faye Webster and later helped her sign with Awful Records in 2017.

In 2018, a remix to "Beef" was released by American rapper Flo Milli titled "Beef FloMix". The song would go viral on TikTok in 2019 becoming Flo Milli's breakout hit.

== Discography ==
=== Albums ===
- ▲ B S T R ▲ C T I C ▲ (2011)
- Car Therapy (2012)
- E (2013)
- 空から来た彼 3 (2014)
- Catalyst (2015)
- Heat Death 2 (2015)
- Final Fantasy (2015)
- Slum Beautiful (with Archibald Slim) (2016)
- All Eyez on E (2019)
- E2 (2020)
- Catalys2 (2021)
- Lt. Bandz (2021)
- Heat Death 4 (2023)
- All Eyez on E 2 (2023)
- Initial E (2025)

=== Mixtapes ===
- The Electric Kool-Aid Acid Tape (2010)
- No Saliva Vol. 1 (2010)
- Heat Death (2014)
- Cactus Jack (2014)
- Blackli$t (2014)
- I Think I'm on Fire (2015)
- I Think I'm on Fire 2 (2015)
- Mankind (2017)

=== Extended plays ===
- Girlfriend (with Slug Christ) (2015)
- Look at Me (2016)
- Dem PayPal Boyz (with Slug Christ as Dem PayPal Boyz) (2018)
- HeatDeath4Prelude (2020)
- Ridge Racer: Prelude (2026)
