= Ho, Why Is You Here? =

Mixtape by Flo Milli
- Released: July 24, 2020
- Genres: Hip-hop; trap; alternative hip-hop
- Length: 29:56
- Labels: '94 Sounds; RCA
- Producers: Yung Tago; Ethereal; Lil Evo; J. White Did It; Raesam; Yung Glizzy; XaviBeatz; Shane Parker; Versatile; WizzerOnDaBeat; Whoismike; Fatboi; AyoJbo; BeyondrichYT

Flo Milli chronology
Ho, Why Is You Here? (2020)	You Still Here, Ho? (2022)

Singles from Ho, Why Is You Here?
- 1. "Beef FloMix" Released: June 10, 2019; 2. "In the Party" Released: October 28, 2019; 3. "Not Friendly" Released: March 31, 2020; 4. "Like That Bitch" Released: June 19, 2020; 5. "Weak" Released: July 10, 2020

Ho, Why Is You Here? is the debut commercial mixtape by American rapper Flo Milli. It was released on July 24, 2020, by '94 Sounds and RCA Records. All songs were written by Flo Milli alongside their producers.

The mixtape debuted and peaked at number 78 on the US Billboard 200. It was preceded by five singles: "Beef FloMix", "In the Party", "Not Friendly", "Like That Bitch" and "Weak". Critical responses were generally positive; Rolling Stone placed it on their list of the "200 Greatest Hip Hop Albums of All Time" (2022). The mixtape was followed up by Flo Milli's studio albums You Still Here, Ho? (2022) and Fine Ho, Stay (2024).

== Background ==
Prior to the release of Ho, Why Is You Here?, Flo rose to prominence following two of the mixtape's singles, "Beef FloMix" (a rework of 2015's "Beef" by Ethereal featuring Playboi Carti) and "In the Party", going viral online, specifically on the social media platform TikTok, which led to her signing to '94 Sounds and RCA Records. In an interview with Respect., Flo Milli said:

"This project is introducing a revamped newer me. A newer version of myself that I'm still discovering. This phase of me comes with an ego and an attitude. This is setting the tone for what I have to come in the future, I want everyone to feel the energy I'm coming with."

In June 2020, Flo Milli revealed the release date and title of Ho, Why Is You Here?.

== Singles ==
The mixtape's lead single, "Beef FloMix", was originally released in October 2018 and later re-released on June 10, 2019, after being picked up by '94 Sounds and RCA Records. The song gained traction after being used in a number of Instagram edit videos, peaking in popularity due to its use in TikTok videos after her manager paid user Michael Pelchat (also known as Nice Michael) $200 to use the song in one of his videos. A music video for the song was released on July 24, 2019.

"In the Party", the second single from the mixtape, was released on October 28, 2019, with an accompanying music video. In January 2020, Flo Milli performed a live mashup of "Beef FloMix" and "In the Party" for Audiomack's "Fine Tuned" series, and performed "In the Party" again in March 2020 during a Vevo Ctrl. Live Session. "In The Party" also gained attention on TikTok.

A third single, "Not Friendly", had previously been released via Flo Milli's SoundCloud in late 2018 and was re-released through RCA Records on March 31, 2020. An animated music video for the track was released on May 6, 2020.

"Like That Bitch", the fourth single from the tape, was released on June 19, 2020, and was advertised by Spotify on a billboard in Times Square. A music video for the track, directed by Sara Lacombe, was released on July 10, 2020, and was named the best music video of July 2020 by Pitchfork.

"Weak", the fifth single from the mixtape, was released on July 10, 2020. The single samples the SWV song of the same name. The music video was premiered on the morning of the mixtape's release date. A Vevo Ctrl. Live Session performance of the song, "at home" edition due to the COVID-19 pandemic, was released on August 14, 2020. Harper's Bazaar called "Weak" one of the "sexiest" songs of 2020.

A double music video for the tracks, "Send The Addy" and "May I", was released on September 18, 2020.

== Critical reception ==
Professional ratings
Review scores
Source	Rating
AllMusic	3.5/5 stars
Exclaim!	9/10
Pitchfork	7.5/10
PopMatters	7/10 stars

Upon release, Ho, Why Is You Here? received acclaim from critics. In a 9/10 review, Teodor Zetko of Exclaim! wrote, "On Flo Milli's new mixtape Ho, why is you here ?, the 20-year-old viral sensation spits out the cadence of a refined rapper met with the flow of the campy, young rising star she is." Steffanee Wang of Nylon called it "a burst of attitude and unbridled fun." Nick Malone of PopMatters wrote similarly in a 7/10 review that the album was "fun, in its purest and most undiluted form", and wrote, "Ho, Why Is You Here? shares DNA with Playboi Carti's Die Lit: an effortlessly curated, expertly engineered portal into a world of cash, confidence, and your hair to your ass." Writing for The Ringer, Micah Peters called the mixtape "not only cool but sort of radical" in regards to her "brash, magnetic alter ego", stating, "Though Ho, Why Is You Here? clocks in at 30 minutes, it is worth at least two hours of your time," adding, "There's something playful and implacable about her delivery. It's not quite like anything else."

In a Pitchfork review, Stephen Kearse called the project "brief" and "playful" and called it "one of the breeziest records of the year, a clinic on nimble shit-talking that's as effortless as it is brash." In a review for Uproxx, Wongo Okon called Flo Milli's confidence on the mixtape "infectious", adding that, "With her debut project, Ho, Why Is You Here? the 19-year-old Alabama native has no plans to be anything besides her most authentic self and flaunt it enthusiastically for the world to savor." BrooklynVegan's Andrew Sacher wrote, "She doesn't seem like she'll be a one or two or three hit wonder -- those already-viral singles ["Beef FloMix" and "In the Party"] are great, but the rest of Ho, Why Is You Here? is just as instantly satisfying." Robyn Mowatt of Okayplayer also praised the mixtape, saying, "In total, her debut epitomizes where female hip-hop is headed. Though she's only 20, Flo Milli passionately shares a glimpse into her sex-positive and amusing life. Ho, Why Is You Here? serves as a wake-up call to the industry."

In a less positive review, Vulture writer Hunter Harris called it an "imperfect debut", writing that "Some songs rely too much on naïve brags Flo Milli doesn't seem ready to commit to; others sound rushed and half finished, with beats she's advanced beyond. But at least a few capitalize on what has positioned her as the first rapper to make it out of Mobile in a meaningful way in some time or pop from TikTok alone." Writing for Pitchfork, Alphonse Pierre wrote, "The tape is not quite as good as I hoped it would be—I'm not sure if there's anything better than her TikTok hits 'Beef Flomix' and 'In the Party,' or her punking-dudes anthem 'Weak'—but that's mostly because of the generic beats on tracks like 'Not Friendly' and 'Scuse Me'."

=== Rankings ===
Critics' rankings of Ho, Why Is You Here?
Publication	List	Rank	Ref.
Complex	The Best Albums of 2020	20	
The New York Times	Jon Caramanica's Best Albums of 2020	8	
NPR	The 50 Best Albums Of 2020	13	
Rolling Stone	The 50 Best Albums of 2020	15	
Uproxx	The Best Albums Of 2020	16	
Vulture	Best Albums of the Year (So Far)	—N/a	

== Track listing ==
Credits adapted from Apple Music and Tidal.

No.	Title	Writer(s)	Producer(s)	Length
1.	"Mood Everyday (Intro)"	Tamia Carter; Aaron Tago	Yung Tago	0:51
2.	"Beef FloMix"	Carter; Ollie Rudolph	Ethereal; Lil Evo	2:27
3.	"Like That Bitch"	Carter; Anthony Jermaine White; Ronny Wright	J. White Did It	3:23
4.	"In the Party"	Carter; Raeshaun Samoa	Raesam	2:17
5.	"Pockets Bigger"	Carter; Andrew Rogers	Yung Glizzy	1:46
6.	"Weak"	Carter; White; Brian Morgan; Ronny Wright	J. White Did It	2:36
7.	"Send the Addy"	Carter; Jafar Scott; Kadijah Moorer; XaviBeatz	XaviBeatz	2:12
8.	"19"	Carter; Shane Parker	Shane Parker	2:24
9.	"May I"	Carter; Andre Young; Andrew Roettger; Calvin Broadus; Daniel Webster; Harry Casey; Mark Adams; Raymond Turner; Rick Finch; Stephen Washington; Steve Arrington; TyShaun "Homeyhill" McQueen	Versatile	2:43
10.	"Pussycat Doll"	Carter; Scott; Jamal Rashad Rolle	WizzerOnDaBeat	2:40
11.	"Not Friendly"	Carter; Deandre Cortez Way; Michael Dobbins; Quandarious Antwan Jordan; Radric Delantic Davis	Whoismike	3:55
12.	"Scuse Me"	Carter; Jaime Lee; Kentavious Johnson; LaDamon Douglas; Ronnie "Ronello" Graham	Fatboi; AyoJbo; BeyondrichYT	2:44

=== Notes ===
- "Weak" samples the song of the same name, as performed by SWV and written by Brian Alexander Morgan.
- "May I" interpolates the song "Gin and Juice", as performed and written by Snoop Dogg and produced by Dr. Dre, which interpolates the song "Watching You", as performed by Slave.

== Personnel ==
Credits adapted from Tidal.

=== Vocals ===
- Tamia Carter – lead vocals
- J. White Did It – background vocals (track 6)
- ROAM – background vocals (track 6)

=== Production ===
- Yung Tago – production (track 1)
- Ethereal – production (track 2)
- J. White Did It – production (tracks 3, 6)
- Raesam – production (track 4)
- Yung Glizzy – production (track 5)
- XaviBeatz – production (track 7)
- Shane Parker – production (track 8)
- Versatile – production (track 9)
- WizzerOnDaBeat – production (track 10)
- Whoismike – production (track 11)
- AyoJbo – production (track 12)
- BeyondRichYT – production (track 12)
- Fatboi – production (track 12)
- Rob Cohen – vocal production (tracks 3, 5, 6)
- Ronny Wright – vocal production (tracks 3, 6)
- Jafar "Far Far Da Dude" Scott – vocal production (tracks 7, 10)

=== Technical ===
- Rob Cohen – engineering (tracks 3, 5, 6)
- Jafar "Far Far Da Dude" Scott – engineering (tracks 7, 10)
- Evan LaRay – mixing (tracks 1, 3, 5–10, 12)
- Kyle "Don" Resto – mixing (tracks 4, 11)
- Chris Athens – mastering (tracks 3, 5, 6, 11)
- Easy European – recording, engineering (tracks 3, 5, 8)

== Charts ==
Chart (2020)	Peak position
US Billboard 200	78
US Top R&B/Hip-Hop Albums (Billboard)	46
