= Monaleo =

American rapper and songwriter

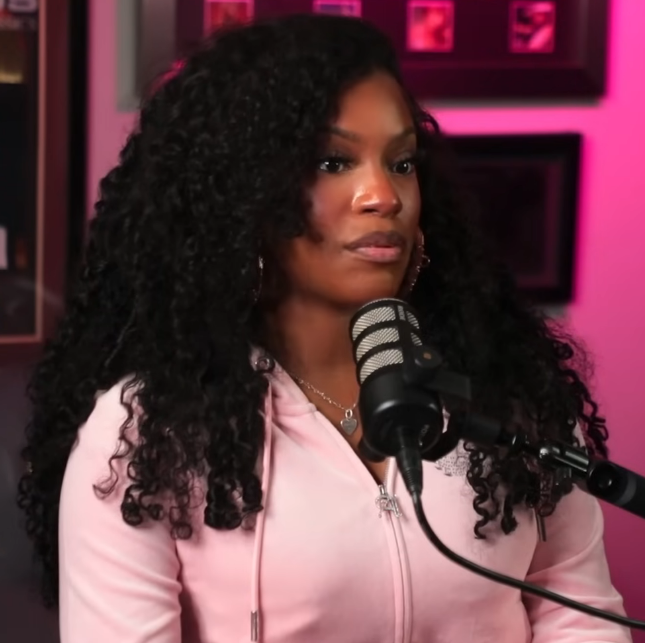
- Monaleo in 2025

Background information
- Born: Leondra Roshawn Gay; April 24, 2001 (age 25); Houston, Texas, U.S.
- Genres: Hip hop; Southern hip hop
- Occupations: Rapper; songwriter
- Instrument: Vocals
- Years active: 2020–present
- Labels: Stomp Down; Columbia; The Orchard
- Spouse: Stunna 4 Vegas (m. 2025)
- Children: 1
- Website: themonaleo.com

Leondra Roshawn Caldwell (née Gay; born April 24, 2001), known by her stage name Monaleo (/ˌmoʊnəˈliːoʊ/ MOH-nuh-LEE-oh), is an American rapper and songwriter. She gained recognition in early 2021 for her single "Beating Down Yo Block".

== Early life ==
Gay was born on April 24, 2001 and raised in Houston, Texas. She attended The High School for Law Enforcement and Criminal Justice, located in Houston. She was in pursuit of a degree in mortuary science at Prairie View A&M University before putting her studies on pause due to her musical career.

== Career ==
Gay began working in music intermittently since January 2020. In September 2020, she released a snippet of her debut single "Beating Down Yo Block" with producer Merion Krazy. The song samples "Knockin Pictures Off da Wall" by Yungstar and was written while she was struggling with a bad breakup. The song went viral on social media in January 2021, gaining over 3 million streams on Spotify and 3.3 million views on the music video on YouTube. Monaleo later released the singles "Girls Outside" and "Suck It Up", the former of which samples "Outside" by OG Bobby Billions. In August 2021, Gay released a music video for the single, "Suck It Up". She released the single "We Not Humping" in December 2021; She raps over a southern hip hop beat. a remix of the song featuring Flo Milli was released in April 2022.

On May 26, 2023, she released her debut studio album, Where the Flowers Don't Die, featuring a guest appearance from Flo Milli. On September 27, 2024, Gay released her first EP, Throwing Bows, featuring guest appearances from Stunna 4 Vegas, Sauce Walka, Kaliii, and other artists. She released her second album, Who Did the Body, on October 17, 2025. She embarked on a North American tour in support of the album, but rescheduled multiple tour dates following a medical emergency. The album featured the single "Putting Ya Dine"; a remix of the song featuring YoungBoy Never Broke Again was released in October 2025. She supported Summer Walker's Still Finally Over It Tour in 2026 alongside Odeal. The Houston City Council proclaimed April 24, 2026 as "Leondra Roshawn Caldwell Day". She featured on a remix of the Trim song "Nobody" alongside G Herbo which was released in July 2026.

Gay is represented by the Stomp Down collective.

== Personal life ==
Gay has stated she is bisexual.

Gay's younger brother is rapper Yung Rampage. She has publicly shared about her past suicide attempts and mental health. In May 2023, Gay gave birth to her first child with partner Stunna 4 Vegas. Gay and Caldwell engaged in 2023 and married on September 19, 2025.

In March 2026, she suffered from "an inflamed cyst the size of a softball"; during emergency surgery, an ovary and fallopian tube were removed. She was diagnosed with polyendocrine metabolic ovarian syndrome (PMOS).

She is a supporter of the BDS movement.

== Discography ==
=== Studio albums ===
List of studio albums, with selected details
Title	Album details
Where the Flowers Don't Die	Released: May 26, 2023; Label: Stomp Down, The Orchard; Format: Digital download, streaming
Who Did the Body	Released: October 17, 2025; Label: Stomp Down, Columbia; Format: Digital download, streaming

=== Extended plays ===
List of extended plays, with selected details
Title	EP details
Throwing Bows	Released: September 27, 2024; Label: Stomp Down, The Orchard; Format: CD, digital download, streaming

=== Singles ===
==== As lead artist ====
List of singles, showing year released and album name
Title	Year	Peak chart positions		Certifications	Album
Title	Year	US Bub.	US R&B/HH	Certifications	Album
"First Draft Pick"	2020	—	—		Non-album single
"Beating Down Yo Block"	2021	—	—	RIAA: Gold	Where the Flowers Don't Die
"Girls Outside"	2021	—	—		Non-album singles
"Suck It Up"	2021	—	—		Non-album singles
"We Not Humping" (solo and remix with Flo Milli)	2021	—	—	RIAA: Gold	Non-album singles
"Body Bag"	2022	—	—		Non-album singles
"Miss U Already" (with NoCap)	2022	—	—		Non-album singles
"Ridgemont Baby"	2023	—	—		Where the Flowers Don't Die
"Sober Mind (A Colors Show)"	2023	—	—		Where the Flowers Don't Die
"Ass Kickin'"	2023	—	—		Where the Flowers Don't Die
"I <3 My N***a"	2023	—	—		Non-album singles
"Crying on Your Birthday"	2023	—	—		Non-album singles
"Don Who Leo"	2024	—	—		Throwing Bows
"Ranchero"	2024	—	—		Non-album single
"Passenger Princess (Jibbitz)" (featuring Stunna 4 Vegas)	2024	—	—		Throwing Bows
"Flush Em" (featuring Kaliii)	2024	—	—		Throwing Bows
"Putting Ya Dine" (solo and remix with YoungBoy Never Broke Again)	2025	8	28		Who Did the Body
"Everythang Pinka" (featuring Teezo Touchdown)	2026				TBA

==== As featured artist ====
List of featured singles, showing year released and album name
Title	Year	Certifications	Album
"Family Ties" (Yung Rampage featuring Monaleo)	2020		Non-album singles
"Lock It Down" (DJ Chose featuring Monaleo)	2021		Non-album singles
"Bald Head Bitch" (Muni Long featuring Monaleo)	2021		Non-album singles
"You Mad" (Josh Mercy featuring Monaleo)	2021		Non-album singles
"Matta & Mona" (Yung Matta featuring Monaleo)	2022		Non-album singles
"Hands Up" (Tay Money featuring Monaleo)	2022		Non-album singles
"Hot Girl" (Fmb Ty featuring Monaleo and Jeezmino)	2022		Non-album singles
"Scary" ($hyne featuring Monaleo)	2022		Who These Rap Niggas Wanna Be Like
"Bed Time" (Flo Milli featuring Gloss Up and Monaleo)	2023		You Still Here, Ho? (Extended)
"Top Notch" (Mahoney featuring Monaleo)	2023		Non-album singles
"Big One" (Kaliii featuring Monaleo)	2024		Non-album singles
"Saint" (K Carbon featuring Monaleo)	2024		Non-album singles
"Problems" (Yung Al featuring Monaleo)	2024		No Hard Feelings
"I Can't Lie" (Bun B & Cory Mo featuring Monaleo & Scotty ATL)	2025		Way Mo Trill
"Yunnnn Wemix" (Stunna 4 Vegas featuring Monaleo)	2025		Non-album singles

=== Guest appearances ===
List of non–single guest appearances, showing song title, year released, other artists and album name
Title	Year	Artist(s)	Album
"Jammin' Screwnem"	2021	GasGang Youngin, OMB Bloodbath, Guapo	Be Someone: HoUSton Population
"Real Problems"	2021	Yung Al	I Am Yung
"Cee Cee"	2021	Maxo Kream	Weight of the World
"Apply Pressure"	2021	Money Stoffice	Gullyside Wayz
"Introvert"	2021	JohnDee	Livestindacity
"Serious"	2022	Rizzoo Rizzoo	Racks and Revenge
"Stick On Me"	2022	KCG Josh, Maxo Kream	The Book of Joshua
"Pop Like"	2023	DJ Chose, KenTheMan, Tay Money	Be Someone: Texas Population
"Don't Worry"	2023	That Mexican OT, Lil Jairmy, OTB Fastlane, LilCJ Kasino, Quin NFN	Be Someone: Texas Population
"Hol Up"	2023	Propain, BeatKing, That Mexican OT	Made from Scratch
"Neva"	2024	Flo Milli	Fine Ho, Stay
"PTP Remix"	2025	Babyfxce E	M Block
"Move Pt. 2"	2025	Mello Buckzz	Hollyhood
"285"	2025	Anycia	Grady Baby
"Can't Stand Me"	2025	Saucy Santana	Haute Sauce
"She Don't Wanna Talk"	2025	Cash Kidd, Ethan Marc	How Ironic
"Baller"	2025	Summer Walker, GloRilla, Sexyy Red	Finally Over It
"Standing O"	2026	Mike Will Made It, Travis Porter	R3set

== Awards and nominations ==
Award	Year	Nominee(s)	Category	Result	Ref.
Give Her FlowHERS Awards	2023	Herself	The Self-Love Award	Won	
NAACP Image Awards	2026	Herself	Outstanding New Artist	Won	
American Music Awards	2026	Herself	Breakthrough Hip-Hop Artist	Won	
BET Awards	2026	Herself	Best New Artist	Nominated	
BET Awards	2026	Herself	Best Female Hip Hop Artist	Nominated	
