= Don't Play with It =

2021 single by Lola Brooke featuring Billy B

Single by Lola Brooke featuring Billy B
- Released: May 14, 2021
- Genre: Brooklyn drill
- Length: 2:11
- Label: Team Eighty; Arista
- Songwriters: Shyniece Thomas; Jahdira Atkins
- Producers: Tsunami; Semibeatzz; Dizzy Banko

Lola Brooke singles chronology
"Back to Business" (2021)	"Don't Play with It" (2021)	"Work" (2021)

Billy B singles chronology
"Don't Play with It" (2021)	"Bachata" (2021)

Music video
- "Don't Play with It" on YouTube
- "Don't Play with It (Remix)" on YouTube

"Don't Play with It" is a single by American rapper Lola Brooke featuring Billy B. It was released in May 2021 and produced by Dizzy Banko. The song was a sleeper hit, gaining traction through the video-sharing app TikTok in 2022 and becoming the breakout hit of both artists.

== Background ==
In an interview with Brooklyn Magazine, when asked how the song came about, Lola Brooke stated, "I was tired of people playing with me, for real. That's really what it was." Brooke was at home when Dizzy Banko was playing her some beats over the phone, and after hearing one of the beats, immediately told him to send it to her. She said, "I was listening to that and I was like 'Don't play with it, don't play with it, don't play with it!'" The song was originally a freestyle; according to Brooke, "I was walking back and forth in the house, and I was like, 'Don't play with it, don't play with it' and I just kept going." After recording the song in the studio, she left an open verse, eventually choosing rapper Billy B for a guest appearance because they were both from Brooklyn.

== Release and promotion ==
The song was released on May 14, 2021, along with a music video. Lola Brooke garnered further recognition for the song with a performance on "From the Block" in November 2021. It caught widespread attention via TikTok in 2022; by October of that year, the video surpassed over 500,000 views. The song considerably increased in streams on Spotify, amassing two million streams in November 2022. As a result of its success, Brooke received cosigns from various celebrities, including rappers Missy Elliott, Cardi B, Meek Mill, JT of City Girls, Saucy Santana and Pusha T, Ella Mai, Kim Kardashian and Shaquille O'Neal, and eventually signed to Arista Records.

== Remix ==
An official remix of the song featuring American rappers Latto and Yung Miami of City Girls was released on March 24, 2023 with an accompanying music video, which was filmed on March 20 in New York City. In an email to Complex, Brooke stated, "I wanted to bring more cities to my world. You have Latto from Atlanta and Yung Miami from Miami and they both go hard for their cities like I do for Brooklyn. The energy was to the ceiling while shooting the music video. We shot it in one day this past Monday, actually. I'll tell y'all this, the NYPD tried to shut my video down twice but we still were able to all do the things we like to doooo. Don't play with us!" The video sees the rappers in the streets and under a freeway overpass, with a large entourage and across the city from Harlem to Brooklyn.

== Charts ==
=== Weekly charts ===
Weekly chart performance for "Don't Play with It"
Chart (2023)	Peak position
US Billboard Hot 100	69
US Hot R&B/Hip-Hop Songs (Billboard)	21
US Mainstream R&B/Hip-Hop Airplay (Billboard)	2
US R&B/Hip-Hop Airplay (Billboard)	7
US Rhythmic (Billboard)	16

=== Year-end charts ===
Year-end chart performance for "Don't Play with It"
Chart (2023)	Position
US Hot R&B/Hip-Hop Songs (Billboard)	67

== Certifications ==
Certifications for "Don't Play with It"
Region	Certification	Certified units/sales
United States (RIAA)	Platinum	1,000,000^{‡}
^{‡} Sales+streaming figures based on certification alone.
