= In the Party =

Single by Flo Milli

Single by Flo Milli

from the album Ho, Why Is You Here?
- Released: October 28, 2019
- Genre: Hip hop
- Length: 2:17
- Label: '94 Sounds; RCA
- Songwriters: Tamia Carter; Raeshaun Samoa
- Producer: Raesam

Flo Milli singles chronology
| "Beef FloMix" (2019) | "In the Party" (2019) | "My Attitude" (2020) |

Music video
- "In the Party" on YouTube

"In the Party" is a song by American rapper Flo Milli. It was released on October 28, 2019, by '94 Sounds and RCA Records. The track is one of her breakthrough hits and the second single from her debut mixtape, Ho, Why Is You Here? (2020).

== Background ==
Along with Flo Milli's previous hit, "Beef FloMix", the song helped propel her to fame through popular use on video-sharing app TikTok. Upon its release, "In the Party" amassed several millions of streams on Spotify as well.

== Reception ==
Micah Peters of The Ringer and Stephen Kearse of Pitchfork both praised the song's opening line, "Dicks up when I step up in the party".

== Certifications ==
| Region | Certification | Certified units/sales |
|---|---|---|
| United States (RIAA) | Platinum | 1,000,000^{‡} |
^{‡} Sales+streaming figures based on certification alone.
