= Who Did the Body =

Studio album by Monaleo
- Released: October 17, 2025
- Genre: Hip-hop
- Length: 32:27
- Labels: Stomp Down; Columbia

Monaleo chronology
| Where the Flowers Don't Die (2023) | Who Did the Body (2025) |

Who Did the Body is the second studio album by American rapper and songwriter Monaleo. It was released on October 17, 2025, through Stomp Down and Columbia Records. "Putting Ya Dine" and "Sexy Soulaan" were released as promotional singles on August 25, and September 26, 2025, respectively. The album has been described as southern gothic.

== Critical reception ==
Professional ratings
Review scores
| Source | Rating |
|---|---|
| Rolling Stone | 4/5 stars |
| Pitchfork | 6.8/10 |

Heven Haile of Pitchfork wrote that Monaleo "shines as a storyteller over bouncy throwback Southern hip-hop." Writing for Rolling Stone, Meagan Jordan wrote that the album was the "most vulnerable work she's done".

== Track listing ==
| No. | Title | Length |
|---|---|---|
| 1. | "Life After Death" | 2:11 |
| 2. | "Bigger Than Big" | 2:55 |
| 3. | "Sexy Soulaan" | 2:02 |
| 4. | "Putting Ya Dine" | 2:59 |
| 5. | "Open the Gates" | 2:06 |
| 6. | "Freak Show" (featuring Lizzo) | 2:29 |
| 7. | "Tamron Hall" | 1:50 |
| 8. | "Locked In" | 2:31 |
| 9. | "Spare Change" | 2:43 |
| 10. | "Dignified" | 4:23 |
| 11. | "Diary of an OG" | 2:15 |
| 12. | "We on Dat (OG Mix)" (featuring Bun B, Paul Wall, and Lil' Keke) | 4:03 |
| Total length: | | 32:27 |

=== Notes ===
- "We on Dat (OG Mix)" featuring Bun B, Paul Wall, and Lil' Keke, is a remix of "We on Dat" by Monaleo, originally released on July 11, 2025.
