= Father (rapper) =

American rapper and producer (born 1990)

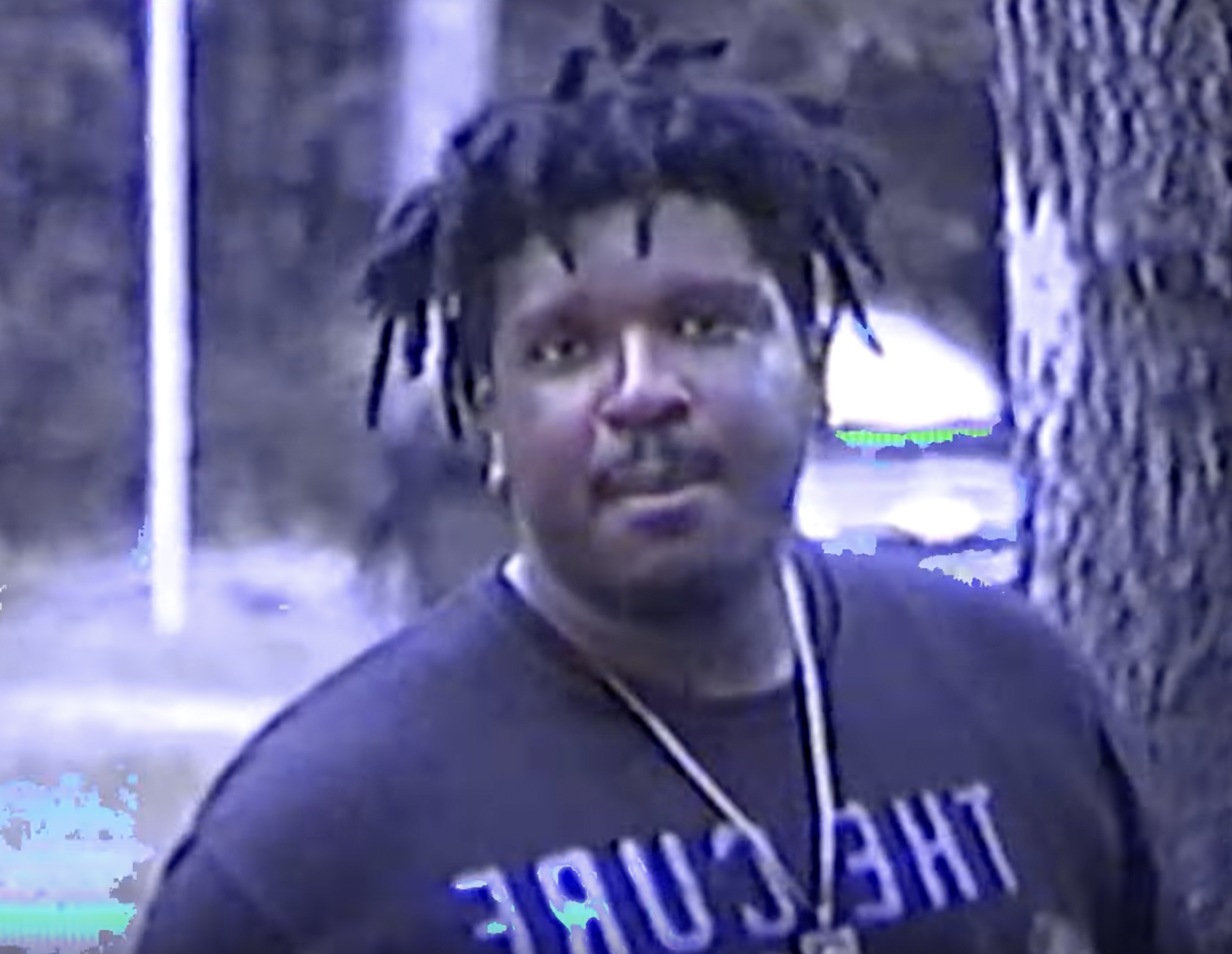
- Father in 2022 in a music video

Background information
- Also known as: Fatheraintshit; Father's Liquor Cabinet
- Born: Centel Orlando Mangum; August 20, 1990 (age 35); Mississippi, U.S.
- Origin: Atlanta, Georgia, U.S.
- Genres: Southern hip-hop; cloud rap; trap
- Occupations: Rapper; songwriter; record executive; record producer
- Years active: 2011–present
- Labels: Awful; RCA; Williams Street
- Website: awfulrecords.com

Centel Orlando Mangum (born August 20, 1990), known professionally as Father, is an American rapper and record producer. He is the founder of the Atlanta-based independent label Awful Records.

== Career ==
=== 2011–2017: Career beginnings, rise to prominence ===
Father rose to prominence as part of Awful Records, an independent record label and creative collective he founded with a group of friends in Atlanta, Georgia. He met most members of Awful while he was attending Georgia State University, studying chemistry. Awful, as a collective, formed in 2011 and recorded with each other shortly thereafter. However, he only began posting his music on SoundCloud in 2013. His breakout single was 2014's "Look at Wrist", featuring iLoveMakonnen and Key!. He released his mixtape Young Hot Ebony in September the same year.

Father unexpectedly released his debut studio album Who's Gonna Get Fucked First? in 2015. Pitchfork described the project's style as "aggressively minimal, leaving [Father] room to experiment with rhythm and timing to better effect". His next album, I'm A Piece of Shit, was released in 2016. Pitchfork characterized the album as an attempt to "forswear his debauched lifestyle" that was portrayed in the previous album. Following the I'm A Piece of Shit tour in late 2016, Father would begin to record a new album entitled Mad as Hell, but it was later shelved. Feeling uninspired, Father would relocate from Atlanta to Los Angeles to record new material.

=== 2018–2020: Awful/RCA, partnership with Adult Swim & departure from RCA ===
In 2018, Awful Records announced a partnership with RCA Records that would allow Awful to sign artists to a joint Awful/RCA contract. Father's major label debut, Awful Swim was released in conjunction with RCA and Adult Swim the same year. Awful and Father would formally end the RCA partnership in 2020 following the release of his EP, Hu$band.

With his departure from RCA, Awful Records would serve to only release new Father material; dropping all of its signees, and as a clothing brand. He told Earmilk in an interview:

"The thing that I started, you know what I started. I never truly intended to become a major label, I just wanted to go with the flow. It started off initially as a collective of artists working together which is what I always wanted it to be, which is what it’s returned to now... I don’t want to own people's careers."

During the COVID-19 pandemic, Father would move back to Atlanta from Los Angeles for familial reasons. Later that year, he released another EP, Tha Thingz I Do 4 Money. The EP marked a complete switch from Father's usual deadpan flow and careless demeanor towards a crooning, auto-tuned style. Father would follow up with his fifth studio album, Come Outside, We Not Gone Jump You in late 2020. The album continued the crooning, auto-tuned flow that was displayed on the EP. As described by Pitchfork, the album is more suitable for "slow dancing than moshing, [but] the party continues."

=== 2021–present: Young Hot Ebony 2 ===
After a string of singles in 2021 and early 2022, Father announced a sequel to his breakout mixtape, Young Hot Ebony. Young Hot Ebony 2 was released on June 10, 2022, with guest appearances from former Awful associates Zack Fox, Meltycanon, and Archibald Slim, alongside Tony Shhnow. The album was a return to Father's signature groaning, deadpan style following the crooning on Come Outside, We Not Gone Jump You.

== Personal life ==
Mangum was born in Mississippi, United States. He relocated to Metro Atlanta with his family at age 10. He attended Georgia State University for a degree in pharmacy, although he did not graduate. His son, Sunday, was born in January 2020. He currently resides in Atlanta with his son and girlfriend.

== Discography ==
=== Albums ===
Title	Album details
Who's Gonna Get Fucked First?	Release: March 17, 2015; Label: Awful Records; Format: Digital download, vinyl, streaming
I'm a Piece of Shit	Release: April 7, 2016; Label: Awful Records; Format: Digital download, streaming
Awful Swim	Release: September 21, 2018; Label: Awful Records, RCA Records, Williams Street Records; Format: Digital download, streaming
Come Outside, We Not Gone Jump You	Release: November 13, 2020; Label: Awful Records; Format: Digital download, vinyl, CD, streaming
Young Hot Ebony 2	Release: June 10, 2022; Label: Awful Entertainment; Format: Digital download, streaming
Patricide	Release: July 30, 2025; Label: Awful Entertainment; Format: Digital download, streaming

=== Mixtapes ===
Title	Album details
Young Hot Ebony	Release: September 1, 2014; Label: Awful Records; Format: Digital download, vinyl, streaming

=== Extended plays ===
Title	Album details
Pretty Boy Satan	Release: May 12, 2013; Label: Awful Records; Format: Digital download
Teen Gohan	Release: April 5, 2014; Label: Awful Records; Format: Digital download
L1L D1DDY	Release: May 14, 2014; Label: Awful Records; Format: Digital download, streaming
Boys & GIrls Club	Release: September 2, 2014; Label: Awful Records; Format: Digital download, streaming
BRAWL (with Richposlim & KeithCharles SpaceBar)	Release: October 6, 2014; Label: Awful Records; Format: Digital download
Dionysus (with Archibald Slim)	Release: August 1, 2015; Label: Awful Records; Format: Digital download
Papicodone	Release: August 17, 2015; Label: Awful Records; Format: Digital download, streaming
Hu$band	Release: October 9, 2019; Label: Awful Records & RCA Records; Format: Digital download, streaming
Tha Thingz I Do 4 Money	Release: August 7, 2020; Label: Awful Records; Format: Digital download, streaming
