= Conceited (song) =

Single by Flo Milli

from the album You Still Here, Ho?
- Released: June 16, 2022
- Genre: Trap
- Length: 2:26
- Label: '94 Sounds; RCA
- Songwriters: Tamia Carter; Tramaine Winfrey; Nicholaus Joseph Williams; Marcos Palacios
- Producer: Young Fyre

Flo Milli singles chronology
"PBC" (2022)	"Conceited" (2022)	"No Face" (2022)

"Conceited" is a song by American rapper Flo Milli. It was released on June 16, 2022, through '94 Sounds and RCA Records as the fourth single from her debut studio album You Still Here, Ho? (2022).

== Background and release ==
Flo Milli released her debut mixtape, Ho, Why Is You Here? in 2020. Since releasing the project, Flo Milli released numerous singles, including "Roaring 20s" and "PBC". She collaborated with American rapper Rico Nasty on the track "Money". In April 2022, she remixed Monaleo's song "We Not Humping". Alongside the release of "Conceited" on June 16, 2022, Flo Milli announced her album You Still Here, Ho?, set for release through RCA Records.

== Composition and reception ==
"Conceited" was produced by Young Fyre, Trinidad James, and Kosine. It is a short, two-minute and 26 second track that contains themes of female empowerment and self-love. The beat of the song was described as energetic, and the lyrics were called braggadocious. She makes bold claims, raps self-affirming lines, and "bounces off the beat". Armon Sadler of Uproxx said that Flo Milli raps "with ferocity" on the track. On the hook of "Conceited", Flo Milli raps: "Feeling myself, I'm conceited", which Ryan Leas of Stereogum called a "characteristic snarl". She continues rapping after the hook, saying that she has been important since she was a fetus, and that she does not need a man's money.

Consequence named "Conceited" their favorite rap song of the week, and called the content of the song a "throwback to Flo Milli's earlier days". Wisdom Iheanyichukwu of Refinery29 remarked that the song has "memorable bars", and called the song as a whole as "fun and unapologetic".

== Music video ==
Directed by Nayip, the song's music video shows Flo Milli looking confidently at six versions of herself, stating that she's "conceited". She is cheered on by other women, as she flexes her hair and nails. Will Lavin of NME described the music video as "high energy", and praised the outfits used.

== Certifications ==
Region	Certification	Certified units/sales
United States (RIAA)	Gold	500,000^{‡}
^{‡} Sales+streaming figures based on certification alone.
