= Fine Ho, Stay =

2024 studio album by Flo Milli

Studio album by Flo Milli
- Released: March 15, 2024
- Length: 33:16
- Labels: '94 Sounds; RCA
- Producers: ATL Jacob; Bangladesh; Bugz Ronin; Cardo; Calvin Ewings; Gerreaux; Johnny Goldstein; Hazel; Honorable C.N.O.T.E.; Hydrate; Juicy J; Karlin; Kuji; LB; Lex Luger; Dallas Martin; Mike Will Made It; Purps; Riton; Shekthisyours; Soulshock; Stuzzy; Sushi Ceej; Tasha Catour; Zwiffa

Flo Milli chronology
You Still Here, Ho? (2022)	Fine Ho, Stay (2024)

Singles from Fine Ho, Stay
- 1. "Never Lose Me" Released: November 30, 2023

Professional ratings
Review scores
Source	Rating
Pitchfork	7/10

Fine Ho, Stay is the second studio album by American rapper Flo Milli. It was released through '94 Sounds and RCA Records on March 15, 2024. It features guest appearances from Anycia, Cardi B, SZA, Gunna, and Monaleo. Production on the album was handled by Bangladesh, Honorable C.N.O.T.E., Johnny Goldstein, Lex Luger, and Mike Will Made It, among others. It serves as the follow-up to Flo Milli's previous projects, Ho, Why Is You Here? (2020) and You Still Here, Ho? (2022).

"Never Lose Me" was released as the album's lead single in November 2023. A remix with SZA and Cardi B was released simultaneously with the album and was included as an album track alongside the original version. The single became Flo's first top-twenty hit on the US Billboard Hot 100, peaking at number 18.

== Background ==
Flo Milli announced the album on March 13, 2024, while announcing the remix to "Never Lose Me", with Cardi B and SZA.

== Singles ==
The album's first and only single, titled "Never Lose Me" was released on November 30, 2023. The track received a remix, featuring Lil Yachty, on December 1, and a remix, featuring Bryson Tiller, on December 24. It later received a remix, featuring both Cardi B and SZA, which appeared on the fifth cut of the album.

== Track listing ==
Fine Ho, Stay track listing
No.	Title	Writer(s)	Producer(s)	Length
1.	"Understand"	Tamia Carter; Derrick Gray; Daniel Perez; Paul Beauregard; Kirsten Spencer	Bugz Ronin	2:02
2.	"New Me" (featuring Anycia)	Carter; Anycia Edwards; Carlton Mays	Honorable C.N.O.T.E.	2:53
3.	"Got the Juice"	Carter; Luke Beasley; Ahmar Bailey; Nicolas Moore	LB; Hazel; Shekthisyours	1:47
4.	"Neva" (featuring Monaleo)	Carter; Leondra Gay; Gray; Jordan Houston; Lexus Lewis; Nathaniel Caserta	Juicy J; Lex Luger; Purps	2:37
5.	"Never Lose Me" (featuring SZA and Cardi B)	Carter; Solána Rowe; Belcalis Almanzar; Marcellus Register; Dion Hayes; Gerald Henry; Hitoshi Kirigaya; Gerreaux Katana	Gerreaux	2:45
6.	"Toast"	Carter; Ronald LaTour; Gabriel Berube	Cardo; Stuzzy; Patrick Gardner^{[a]}	2:30
7.	"Can't Stay Mad"	Carter; Latasha Williams	Tasha Catour	2:48
8.	"Edible" (featuring Gunna)	Carter; Sergio Kitchens; Shondrae Crawford; Jocelyn Donald; Calvin Ewings; Dallas Martin	Bangladesh; Ewings; Martin	2:56
9.	"Lay Up"	Carter; Charles Jennings	Sushi Ceej	2:41
10.	"Life Hack"	Carter; Jacob Canady; Ofer Ishai	ATL Jacob; Kuji	2:21
11.	"Clap Sum"	Carter; Michael Williams II; Jesse van der Meulen	Mike Will Made It; Zwiffa	1:52
12.	"Tell Me What You Want"	Carter; Johnny Goldstein; Henry Smithson; Gray; Theron Thomas	Goldstein; Riton	2:07
13.	"Not Sorry"	Carter; Kenneth Karlin; Andreas Rasmussen; Carsten Schack; Olufeyikemi Osuntokun; 8ae	Karlin; Hydrate; Soulshock	1:52
14.	"Never Lose Me"	Carter; Register; Hayes; Ford; Kirigaya	Gerreaux	2:05
Total length:				33:16

=== Note ===
- ^{^[a]} signifies an assistant producer

== Personnel ==
- Flo Milli – vocals
- Chris Athens – mastering
- Florian "Flo" Ongonga – mixing (tracks 1–11, 13, 14)
- Aresh Banaji – mixing (tracks 1–11, 13, 14)
- A. Bains – mixing (tracks 1–11, 13, 14)
- Pat "Teezio" Pigliapoco – mixing (track 12)
- Naif Alkhamri – engineering (tracks 1–6, 8–14)
- Greg Eliason – engineering (track 1)
- Evan LaRay – engineering (track 5)
- Hector Castro – engineering (track 5)
- Ashley Jacobson – engineering (track 7)
- Garrett Duncan – engineering assistance (tracks 1–4, 6, 8, 9, 13)
- Connor McFarland – engineering assistance (tracks 5, 14)
- Mason Sexton – engineering assistance (track 5)
- Tarena Dawn – engineering assistance (tracks 5, 14)
- Hayden Duncan – engineering assistance (tracks 5, 14)
- Zach Zamichow – engineering assistance (track 7)
- Patrick Gardner – engineering assistance (tracks 8, 9, 13)
- Dereck Negron – engineering assistance (tracks 10, 11)

== Charts ==
Chart performance for Fine Ho, Stay
Chart (2024)	Peak position
US Billboard 200	54
US Top R&B/Hip-Hop Albums (Billboard)	20
