= Beef FloMix =

2018 single by Flo Milli

Single by Flo Milli

from the album Ho, Why Is You Here?
- Released: October 5, 2018; June 10, 2019 (re-release)
- Genre: Hip hop
- Length: 2:27
- Label: '94 Sounds; RCA
- Songwriters: Tamia Carter; Obie Rudolph
- Producers: Ethereal; Lil Evo

Flo Milli singles chronology
| "Beef FloMix" (2018) | "In the Party" (2019) |

Music video
- "Beef FloMix" on YouTube

"Beef FloMix" is a song by American rapper Flo Milli. It is a remix of the song "Beef" by American rapper and producer Ethereal featuring rapper Playboi Carti. Originally released in 2018, the song became popular through TikTok in April 2019 and became Flo Milli's breakout hit. It is also the lead single from her debut mixtape, Ho, Why Is You Here? (2020).

== Background ==
According to Flo Milli, she was a "very depressed girl" at the time she wrote the song, and was smoking and freestyle rapping to a beat. The song sees her taking shots at her haters.

The song was first released in October 2018. It first gained traction through Instagram edit and meme videos. Rapper Dbangz showed the meme to his manager, Vonsin Faniyi, who contacted Milli about promoting the song on TikTok. Faniyi paid TikTok star Michael Pelchat (also known as Nice Michael) $200 to use the song in one of his videos. A dance to the song was created and went viral on TikTok. The success of the song led to Flo Milli signing to '94 Sounds and RCA Records. In April 2019, the song reached Number Two on Spotify's Viral 50 Chart. It was released to digital download and streaming services on June 10, 2019.

== Critical reception ==
Critics have praised the song for its confident tone. Elias Leight of Rolling Stone gave the song a mixed review, writing, "The melody is lazy, almost nonsensical, a series of notes assembled seemingly at random. Flo Milli's lines, in contrast, are pointed and direct: 'I do what I please, and you do what I ask.'" Robby Seabrook III of XXL wrote, "Flo's spin on the song is refreshing, using her sharp-yet-fluid flow to brag, issue threats and flex."

== Certifications ==
| Region | Certification | Certified units/sales |
|---|---|---|
| United States (RIAA) | Gold | 500,000^{‡} |
^{‡} Sales+streaming figures based on certification alone.
