= Never Lose Me =

Single by Flo Milli

from the album Fine Ho, Stay
- Released: November 30, 2023
- Recorded: 2023
- Genre: Hip hop
- Length: 2:05
- Label: '94 Sounds; RCA
- Songwriter: Tamia Monique Carter
- Producer: Gerreaux

Flo Milli singles chronology
"BGC" (2023)	"Never Lose Me" (2023)

Music video
- "Never Lose Me" on YouTube

"Never Lose Me" is a song by American rapper Flo Milli, released on November 30, 2023, through '94 Sounds and RCA Records as the lead single from her second studio album, Fine Ho, Stay (2024). Produced by Gerreaux, it received several remixes with Lil Yachty, Bryson Tiller, SZA and Cardi B. The song uses the instrumental of "Ron Artest" by Babyface Ray and 42 Dugg, which itself samples "Anata Ga Iru Jinsei" by Japanese artist Jin Kirigaya. The song became Flo Milli's first entry on the US Billboard Hot 100 and numerous international charts.

== Background and release ==
Milli released an extended play with five versions of the song on December 24, 2023. It has Bryson Tiller, the original, sped up and slowed down, and a Lil Yachty feature. According to HotNewHipHop, "Never Lose Me" is a quick two-minute track that paints a story of Milli doing all she can to not lose this successful man. On January 19, 2024, a string of messages from SZA were revealed by Flo Milli. Social media users were speculating that SZA offered to sing on Flo Milli's song "Never Lose Me" after exchanging text messages. SZA shared Flo Milli's song on her Instagram account to heighten the anticipation alongside a photo from the studio showing a Digital Audio Workstation. Flo Milli performed "Never Lose Me" at Genius Open Mic studio. According to Billboard Magazine, "Never Lose Me" is the biggest hit of Flo Milli's career. On March 14, 2024, Flo Milli announced a remix of "Never Lose Me" with SZA and Cardi B which was released the following day, 15, March 2024 alongside the album Fine Ho, Stay.

== Chart performance ==
"Never Lose Me" received widespread attention on TikTok, being played in over 135,000 TikTok clips. It reached number 17 on the Billboard Rap Airplay chart and number 18 on the Hot R&B/Hip-Hop Songs chart. It debuted at number 84 and peaked at number 15 on the Billboard Hot 100 chart, becoming her first entry on the chart. "Never Lose Me" has the longest running streak at No. 1 on the TikTok Billboard Top 50 of any song since its release in September 2023, having spent four weeks straight at the top charts. The song also entered Top 10 on Hot R&B/Hip-Hop Songs.

== Music video ==
On December 18, 2023, Flo Milli released the music video for "Never Lose Me". It was directed by Boni Mata and Leff. Flo Milli was fully clothed in Pucci for the visuals, which was taken at five in the morning in Houston to portray nightlife.

== Track listing ==
"Never Lose Me" single track listing
No.	Title	Writer(s)	Length
1.	"Never Lose Me"	Tamia Monique Carter	2:05
2.	"Never Lose Me" (featuring Lil Yachty)	Carter; Miles Parks McCollum	2:45
3.	"Never Lose Me" (featuring Bryson Tiller)	Carter; Bryson Djuan Tiller	2:21
4.	"Never Lose Me" (slowed)	Carter	3:12
5.	"Never Lose Me" (sped up)	Carter	1:49

== Charts ==
=== Weekly charts ===
Weekly chart performance for "Never Lose Me"
Chart (2023–2024)	Peak position
Australia (ARIA)	23
Australia Hip Hop/R&B (ARIA)	5
Canada (Canadian Hot 100)	17
Global 200 (Billboard)	22
Ireland (IRMA)	19
Latvia (LAIPA)	9
Lithuania (AGATA)	7
Netherlands (Single Top 100)	67
New Zealand (Recorded Music NZ)	10
Poland (Polish Streaming Top 100)	91
Portugal (AFP)	116
Slovakia Singles Digital (ČNS IFPI)	70
Sweden Heatseeker (Sverigetopplistan)	3
Switzerland (Schweizer Hitparade)	59
UK Singles (Official Charts)	15
UK Hip Hop/R&B (Official Charts)	3
US Billboard Hot 100	15
US Hot R&B/Hip-Hop Songs (Billboard)	6
US Rhythmic (Billboard)	2

=== Year-end charts ===
Year-end chart performance for "Never Lose Me"
Chart (2024)	Position
Australia Hip Hop/R&B (ARIA)	18
Canada (Canadian Hot 100)	73
Global 200 (Billboard)	146
New Zealand (Recorded Music NZ)	50
US Billboard Hot 100	49
US Hot R&B/Hip-Hop Songs (Billboard)	14
US Rhythmic (Billboard)	21

== Certifications ==
Certifications for "Never Lose Me"
Region	Certification	Certified units/sales
Australia (ARIA)	Platinum	70,000^{‡}
Canada (Music Canada)	Platinum	80,000^{‡}
France (SNEP)	Gold	100,000^{‡}
New Zealand (RMNZ)	2× Platinum	60,000^{‡}
Poland (ZPAV)	Gold	25,000^{‡}
Switzerland (IFPI Switzerland)	Platinum	30,000^{‡}
United Kingdom (BPI)	Platinum	600,000^{‡}
United States (RIAA)	Platinum	1,000,000^{‡}
^{‡} Sales+streaming figures based on certification alone.
