= Flo Milli =

American rapper (born 2000)

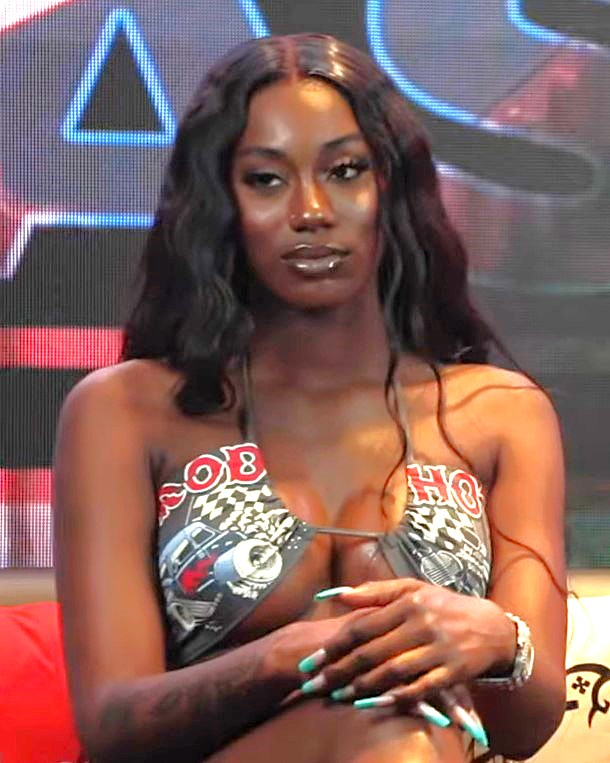
- Flo Milli in 2024

Background information
- Born: Tamia Monique Carter; January 9, 2000 (age 26); Mobile, Alabama, U.S.
- Genre: Southern hip-hop
- Occupations: Rapper, singer, songwriter
- Works: Flo Milli discography
- Years active: 2018–present
- Labels: '94 Sounds; RCA; Jive
- Children: 1
- Website: flomilli.com

Tamia Monique Carter (born January 9, 2000), known professionally as Flo Milli, is an American rapper and singer-songwriter. She rose to prominence after her 2018 single "Beef FloMix" and its 2019 follow-up, "In the Party" both reached virality on TikTok; the latter received platinum certification by the Recording Industry Association of America (RIAA). In late 2019, she signed a recording contract with RCA Records and Justin Goldman's label, '94 Sounds.

Both songs were issued as lead singles for Carter's debut mixtape, Ho, Why Is You Here? (2020), which was met with critical acclaim and placed on Rolling Stone's list of the Greatest Hip Hop Albums of All Time. It moderately entered the Billboard 200. Her debut studio album, You Still Here, Ho? (2022) was met with similar positive reception despite failing to chart. The latter spawned the single, "Conceited", which received gold certification by the RIAA. "Never Lose Me", the lead single of her second studio album, Fine Ho, Stay (2024), marked her first entry on the US Billboard Hot 100 and peaked within its top 20.

Carter was nominated for Best New Artist at the 2020 BET Hip Hop Awards and 2021 BET Awards.

== Early life ==
Carter was born and raised in Mobile, Alabama. She wrote her first song at 9 years old, and began rapping at age 11, forming rap group Real & Beautiful, later known as Pink Mafia, which she dissolved at age 14. After watching an episode of BET's music video countdown show 106 & Park that featured Nicki Minaj, she was inspired and began writing short verses that grew into songs.

Speaking about her high school experience, she said, "I dealt with everything, so it just taught me that the only thing that matters is my opinion of myself." In 2015, she released her first solo song, "No Hook". She grew up listening to Nicki Minaj, Lil Wayne, Kesha, Shakira, Jill Scott, Anthony Hamilton and Erykah Badu.

== Career ==
=== 2018–2021: Ho, Why Is You Here? ===
In October 2018, Flo Milli recorded the original version of her breakout single, "Beef FloMix", a freestyle over the instrumental of rapper and producer Ethereal's 2014 track "Beef" featuring rapper Playboi Carti. It went viral on Instagram and other social media sites, including TikTok, reaching number two on Spotify's Viral 50 in April 2019. A fully-produced version of the song was released in July 2019, and received over 46 million streams on Spotify. Flo Milli's follow-up single was "In the Party", released in October 2019.

In December 2019, She performed at Rolling Loud Los Angeles. At the end of 2019, she signed to record executive Justin Goldman's label '94 Sounds and RCA Records. In February 2020, she released the single "My Attitude". Her singles "Not Friendly" and "Eat It Up" were released in March and April 2020 respectively. In June 2020, Flo Milli released the J. White Did It-produced single "Like That Bitch". A music video for the track was released in July 2020, alongside another single, "Weak". Flo Milli's debut mixtape, Ho, Why Is You Here?, was released on July 24, 2020, to critical praise. It received a placement on Rolling Stone's "200 Greatest Hip Hop Albums of All Time" list in 2022.

In August 2020, Flo Milli signed an exclusive global co-publishing deal with Pulse Music Group. The company described the deal, which encompasses her entire catalog, as "a highly competitive signing situation". In August 2020, singer Saygrace featured Flo Milli on the remix of her single, "Boys Ain't Shit". In September 2020, she appeared in the music video for G-Eazy's single, "Down", featuring Latto. Flo Milli was nominated for Best New Artist at the 2020 BET Hip Hop Awards in September 2020.

In January 2021, Flo Milli released the single, "Roaring 20s". In June 2021, she was included on the XXL Freshman Class of 2021. She was nominated for Best New Artist at the BET Awards 2021.

=== 2022–2023: You Still Here, Ho? ===
On July 20, 2022, she released her debut studio album, You Still Here, Ho?.

In 2023, Flo Milli released an extended version of You Still Here, Ho? with three additional tracks. Continuing her run of releases, Flo Milli issued multiple singles in 2023, ahead of her upcoming studio album Fine Ho, Stay, including "Fruit Loop", "Chocolate Rain" and "Never Lose Me".

In December 2023, Flo Milli released the single "Never Lose Me", which became her first entry on the US Billboard Hot 100, debuting at number 84 and peaking at number 18 on the chart.

=== 2024–present: Fine Ho, Stay ===
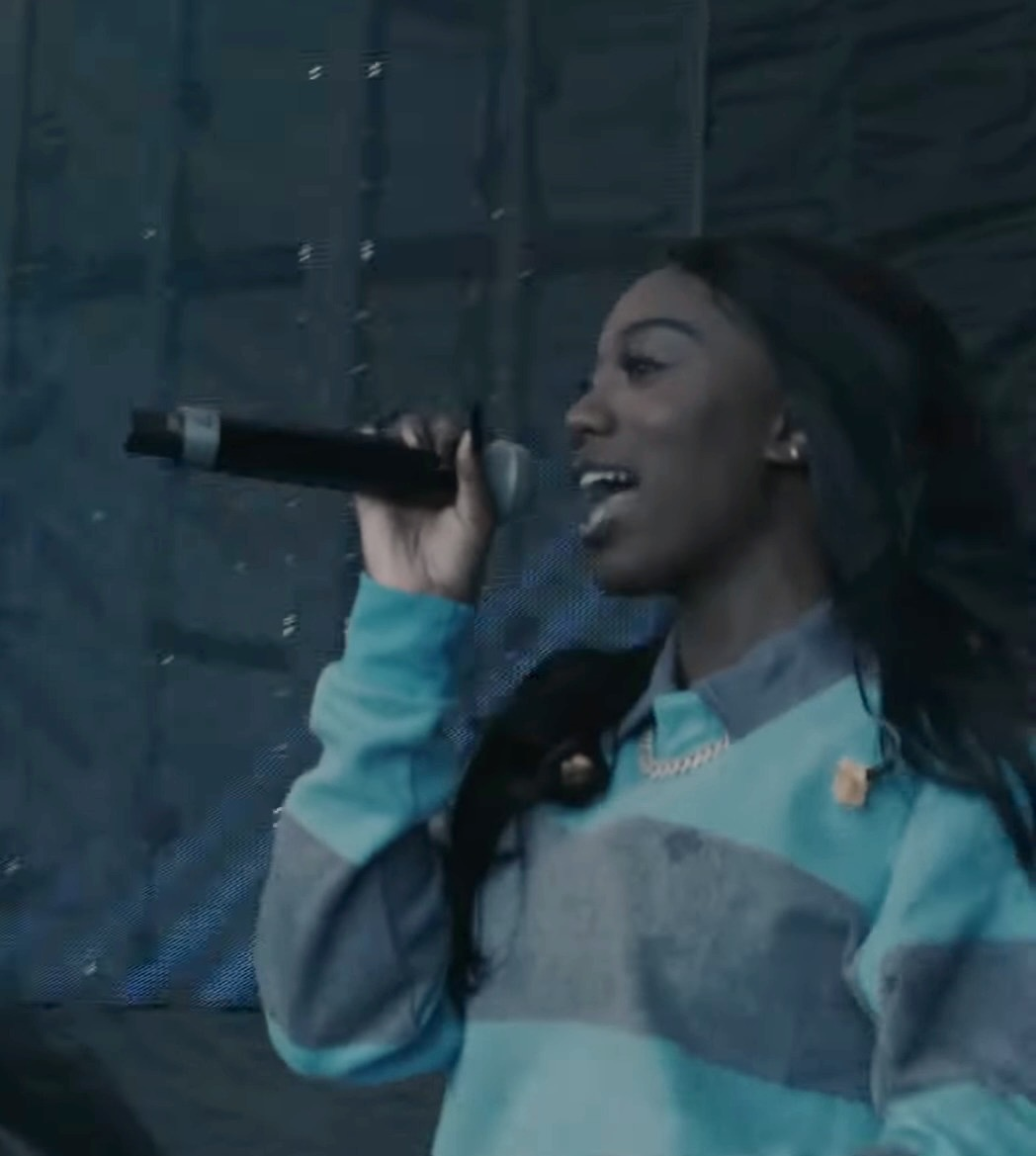
Flo Milli performing in 2025

On March 15, 2024, Flo Milli released her second studio album, Fine Ho, Stay. She was named as the special guest on rapper Gunna's 2024 North American tour, The Bittersweet Tour, performing at 16 shows from May to June. In October 2024, she collaborated with Megan Thee Stallion on “Roc Steady”.

== Personal life ==
In November 2024, Flo Milli announced her pregnancy. On March 17, 2025, she revealed that her boyfriend, South Florida rapper G6Reddot, was the father. On April 25, 2025, Milli announced that she gave birth to her son.

== Public image ==
Jon Caramanica of The New York Times described Flo Milli as a "clever, cheerful lyricist". Jessica McKinney of Complex wrote, "The Mobile, Alabama rapper's bubbly, intoxicating delivery defies regional sounds, making her a versatile artist whose music can travel well beyond her hometown. She's a star." Rapper ppcocaine cited Flo Milli as an influence on their music.

She supported the Kamala Harris 2024 presidential campaign.

== Discography ==
Studio albums

- You Still Here, Ho? (2022)
- Fine Ho, Stay (2024)
- Flo State (2026)

== Awards and nominations ==
Organization	Year	Category	Nominee	Result	Ref.
BET Hip Hop Awards	2020	Best New Artist	Herself	Nominated	
BET Awards	2021	Best New Artist	Herself	Nominated	
MTV Video Music Awards	2023	Push Performance of the Year	"Conceited"	Nominated	
MTV Europe Music Awards	2023	Push Performance of the Year	Herself	Nominated	
Give Her FlowHERS Awards	2023	The Bloom Award	Herself	Won	
