= Sexyy Red 4 President Tour =

2024 concert tour by Sexyy Red

- Tour by Sexyy Red
- Associated album: In Sexyy We Trust
- Start date: August 24, 2024
- End date: December 14, 2024
- Legs: 1
- No. of shows: 19
- Supporting acts: Hunxho; Loe Shimmy; BlakeIANA; Kodak Black; BossMan Dlow; Erica Banks; KenTheMan; Cartel Bo

Sexyy Red concert chronology
- Hood Hottest Princess Tour (2023); Sexyy Red 4 President Tour (2024)

The Sexyy Red 4 President Tour was the second concert tour by American rapper Sexyy Red in support of her third mixtape, In Sexyy We Trust (2024). It began on August 24, 2024, in Atlanta, with shows across North America and concluded in Miami on December 14 comprising 19 shows. Hunxho, Loe Shimmy, BlakeIANA, Kodak Black, BossMan Dlow, Erica Banks, KenTheMan and Cartel Bo serve as the opening acts.

== Background ==
On June 26, 2024, Sexyy Red formally announced the tour, with 26 shows across North America from August through October 2024. Tickets went on sale on June 28, with a presale that ran from June 27 until June 28.

== Set list ==
The following set list is obtained from the August 24, 2024 show in Atlanta. It is not intended to represent all dates throughout the tour.

1. "TTG (Go)"
2. "I Don't Wanna Be Saved"
3. "Awesome Jawsome"
4. "FTCU (Sleezemix)"
5. "Sexyy Love Money"
6. "Peaches & Eggplants"
7. "Shake Yo Dreads"
8. "Hellcats SRTs"
9. "Fake Jammin"
10. "Pound Town"
11. "Hood Rats"
12. "N.P.O."
13. "Come Here"
14. "It's My Birthday"
15. "Bow Bow Bow (F My Baby Dad)"
16. "Watch Out"
17. "Birthday Song"
18. "Freak No More"
19. "Hotel Lobby (Unc & Phew)"
20. "Rich Baby Daddy"
21. "U My Everything"
22. "SkeeYee"
23. "Get It Sexyy" (played twice)

Encore

24. "Sexyy Walk"

=== Notes ===
- On September 17, 2024, during the Brooklyn show, Sexyy Red brought out Ice Spice to perform “Deli”.

== Tour dates ==
List of 2024 concerts, showing date, city, country, venue, opening acts, attendance and gross revenue
Date (2024)	City	Country	Venue	Opening act(s)	Attendance	Revenue
August 24	Atlanta	United States	State Farm Arena	Kodak Black; Loe Shimmy; BlakeIANA	—N/a	—N/a
August 30	Fort Worth	United States	Dickies Arena	Hunxho; Kodak Black; Loe Shimmy; BlakeIANA	—N/a	—N/a
September 1	Cedar Park (Note: Labeled as Austin in promotional material.)	United States	H-E-B Center at Cedar Park	Hunxho; Kodak Black; Loe Shimmy; BlakeIANA	—N/a	—N/a
September 5	Lincoln	United States	Pinnacle Bank Arena	Hunxho; Kodak Black; Loe Shimmy; BlakeIANA	—N/a	—N/a
September 6	Bonner Springs (Note: Labeled as Kansas City in promotional material.)	United States	Azura Amphitheater	Hunxho; Kodak Black; Loe Shimmy; BlakeIANA	—N/a	—N/a
September 10	Grand Rapids	United States	Van Andel Arena	Hunxho; Kodak Black; Loe Shimmy; BlakeIANA; BossMan Dlow	—N/a	—N/a
September 13	St. Louis	United States	Enterprise Center	Hunxho; Loe Shimmy; BlakeIANA; BossMan Dlow	—N/a	—N/a
September 14	Columbus	United States	Nationwide Arena	Hunxho; Kodak Black; Loe Shimmy; BlakeIANA; BossMan Dlow	—N/a	—N/a
September 15	Pittsburgh	United States	Petersen Events Center	Hunxho; Kodak Black; Loe Shimmy; BlakeIANA	—N/a	—N/a
September 17	Brooklyn	United States	Barclays Center	Hunxho; Kodak Black; Loe Shimmy; BlakeIANA; BossMan Dlow	—N/a	—N/a
September 20	Philadelphia	United States	Liacouras Center	Hunxho; Kodak Black; Loe Shimmy; BlakeIANA	—N/a	—N/a
September 25	Tampa	United States	Amalie Arena	Hunxho; Kodak Black; Loe Shimmy; BlakeIANA	—N/a	—N/a
September 26	Orlando	United States	Addition Financial Arena	Hunxho; Kodak Black; Loe Shimmy; BlakeIANA	—N/a	—N/a
September 30	Birmingham	United States	Legacy Arena	Hunxho; Kodak Black; Loe Shimmy; BlakeIANA	—N/a	—N/a
October 1	Nashville	United States	Nashville Municipal Auditorium	Hunxho; Kodak Black; Loe Shimmy; BlakeIANA	—N/a	—N/a
October 27 (Note: This concert is part of ONE Musicfest.)	Atlanta	United States	Piedmont Park	—N/a	—N/a	—N/a
November 1 (Note: This concert is part of The Big HC Pt. II.)	Columbia	United States	Colonial Life Arena	—N/a	—N/a	—N/a
December 6 (Note: Rescheduled from August 31.)	Houston	United States	Toyota Center	Hunxho; Erica Banks; KenTheMan; Loe Shimmy; BlakeIANA; Cartel Bo	—N/a	—N/a
December 14 (Note: This concert is part Rolling Loud.)	Miami	United States	Hard Rock Stadium	—N/a	—N/a	—N/a

=== Cancelled concerts ===
List of cancelled concerts showing date, city, country, venue and reason
Date (2024)	City	Country	Venue	Reason
August 22	Seattle	United States	WaMu Theater	Low Ticket Sales
August 23	Portland	United States	Moda Center	Low Ticket Sales
August 26	Oakland	United States	Oakland Arena	Low Ticket Sales
August 27	San Diego	United States	Pechanga Arena	Low Ticket Sales
September 3	Oklahoma City	United States	Zoo Amphitheater	Low Ticket Sales
September 7	Minneapolis	United States	Minneapolis Armory	Low Ticket Sales
September 9	Milwaukee	United States	Fiserv Forum	Low Ticket Sales
September 21	New Haven	United States	Westville Music Bowl	Low Ticket Sales
September 29	New Orleans	United States	Champions Square	Low Ticket Sales
