= Ranchi (disambiguation) =

Ranchi is the capital of the state of Jharkhand in India.

Ranchi can also refer to:

- Ranchi (Vidhan Sabha constituency), constituency of the Jharkhand Legislative Assembly in India
- Ranchi (Lok Sabha constituency), Indian parliamentary constituency in Jharkhand
- Ranchi district, a district in the Indian state of Jharkhand with Ranchi as its capital
- Ranchi University, a premier Indian University
- Ranchi Rhinos, Hockey India League team based in Ranchi
- SS Ranchi, a British ocean liner
- Ranchi Diaries, a 2017 Hindi film
- Federica Ranchi (1939–2025), Italian actress

== See also ==
- Ranchy
- Raunchy (disambiguation)
