= Get It Sexyy =

2024 single by Sexyy Red

Single by Sexyy Red

from the album In Sexyy We Trust
- Released: March 15, 2024
- Genre: Crunk; snap
- Length: 2:28
- Label: Open Shift
- Songwriter: Janae Nierah Wherry
- Producers: Tay Keith; Jake Fridkis

Sexyy Red singles chronology
| "Somethin'" (2024) | "Get It Sexyy" (2024) | "Damn Shorty" (2024) |

Music video
- "Get It Sexyy" on YouTube

"Get It Sexyy" is a song by American rapper Sexyy Red, released on March 15, 2024 by Gamma and Open Shift Distribution. It was written by Red and produced by previous collaborators Tay Keith and Jake Fridkis. It is her first song (as a lead artist) to be released following her mainstream breakthrough the previous year. It contains an uncredited sample and interpolation of the 2009 single "Halle Berry (She's Fine)" by Hurricane Chris featuring Superstarr.

"Get It Sexyy" was commercially successful, debuting at number 23 on the Billboard Hot 100, making it her second highest charting song, after "Rich Baby Daddy", and her first top 40 solo entry. The song later peaked at number 20 on the chart. The song also peaked at number 73 on the Global 200 chart and number 82 on the Canadian Hot 100 chart.

== Background ==
On February 5, 2024, Red announced that she had given birth to her second child but was already waiting to get discharged in order to "hit da block" again. Only five weeks later, the rapper shared a clip of a new music video featuring an upcoming song that would later turn out to be "Get It Sexyy". Ahead of its release, the rapper asked fans to user "MySpace filters" to go along with the artwork of the release. A YouTube Short released alongside the song shows Red dancing in a stadium, inspired by Drake's and J. Cole's It's All a Blur Tour.

== Composition ==
"Get It Sexyy" opens with an "undeniably hooky boast" before the rapper adds "layers of charmingly delivered background vocals" to boost the song's "immediacy". The "snap beat-inspired" track also features a "heavy, churning beat" by producer and long-time collaborator Tay Keith, who previously worked on her 2023 break-out hits "Pound Town" and "SkeeYee". The collaboration was seen as a "natural fit" as a blend between Keith's "loud and aggressive beats" and the "ratchetness" as well as the "sexually confident energy" of the rapper. "Get It Sexyy" samples and interpolates the 2009 single "Halle Berry (She's Fine)" by Hurricane Chris featuring Superstarr. The second verse of the song contains an interpolation of the chorus of Iggy Azalea’s 2019 single "Sally Walker", which in turn is an interpolation of the children's nursery rhyme, "Little Sally Walker".

== Charts ==
=== Weekly charts ===
Weekly chart performance for "Get It Sexyy"
| Chart (2024) | Peak position |
|---|---|
| Canada Hot 100 (Billboard) | 82 |
| Global 200 (Billboard) | 73 |
| US Billboard Hot 100 | 20 |
| US Hot R&B/Hip-Hop Songs (Billboard) | 6 |
| US Rhythmic Airplay (Billboard) | 8 |

=== Year-end charts ===
2024 year-end chart performance for "Get It Sexyy"
| Chart (2024) | Position |
|---|---|
| US Billboard Hot 100 | 55 |
| US Hot R&B/Hip-Hop Songs (Billboard) | 18 |
| US Rhythmic (Billboard) | 38 |

== Certifications ==
Certifications for "Get It Sexyy"
| Region | Certification | Certified units/sales |
|---|---|---|
| New Zealand (RMNZ) | Gold | 15,000^{‡} |
| United States (RIAA) | 2× Platinum | 2,000,000^{‡} |
^{‡} Sales+streaming figures based on certification alone.
