= Made in Korea =

Made in Korea may refer to:

- Made in Korea: The K-Pop Experience, a 2024 British reality television show
- Made in Korea (TV series), a 2025 South Korean television series
- Made in Korea (film), 2026 Indian film
- Something that is manufactured in South Korea
