= Raunchy =

Raunchy or raunch may refer to:

- Raunchy (instrumental), a 1957 song
- Raunchy (band), a Danish metal band
- Hardcore pornography
- Raunch aesthetics, the ways in which women in hip hop express their sexuality
- Raunch culture, concept described by Ariel Levy in the book Female Chauvinist Pigs

== See also ==
- Ranchy, a commune in France
