= Wah Gwan Delilah =

2024 single by Snowd4y featuring Drake

Single by Snowd4y featuring Drake
- Released: June 3, 2024
- Length: 3:52
- Label: Self-released
- Songwriters: Tom Higgenson; Miguel Amaral
- Producers: Sean O'Keefe; Ariel Rechtshaid

Music video
- "Wah Gwan Delilah" on YouTube

Drake singles chronology
"Family Matters" (2024)	"Wah Gwan Delilah" (2024)	"U My Everything" (2024)

"Wah Gwan Delilah" is a song by Canadian comedian and social media personality Snowd4y featuring Canadian rapper Drake. It is a parody of the Plain White T's song "Hey There Delilah", with the lyrics rewritten around Toronto slang and Jamaican Patois. Snowd4y released it on SoundCloud on June 3, 2024, and it spread quickly online after listeners questioned whether the Drake verse was real or made with artificial intelligence. Drake and his team later confirmed his involvement.

== Background and release ==
Snowd4y is a Toronto-based social media personality who makes skits in an exaggerated Toronto accent. He teased an early version of the song on the Canadian outlet Waveroom several months before its release. The week before the release, he appeared on the Richdiet podcast and was asked about a possible Drake collaboration. He said he might do a local collab, but that Drake would have to "come on it neatly". Drake was following Snowd4y on Instagram by that point.

Snowd4y uploaded "Wah Gwan Delilah" to SoundCloud on the night of Monday, June 3, 2024. Drake shared a screenshot of the track on his Instagram Story with the caption "@snowd4y wake up the city". His collaborator Hush also posted a screenshot on Instagram, captioned "One for the city". It was Drake's second guest appearance since the end of his feud with Kendrick Lamar, following his verse on Sexyy Red's "U My Everything".

At release the song was available only on SoundCloud and not on streaming services. The SoundCloud upload had passed 200,000 plays within a day. By June 10, it had been played more than 700,000 times before it was deleted, and a lyric video on YouTube had 1.2 million views. HipHopCanada credited Sean O'Keefe and Ariel Rechtshaid as producers.

== Lyrics ==
The song keeps the melody of "Hey There Delilah" but replaces the lyrics with Toronto references and slang. The title phrase "wah gwan" is Jamaican Patois for "what's going on", and Complex noted that Toronto's large Caribbean community is part of where the slang comes from. Drake sings his verse in an exaggerated Jamaican accent with heavy AutoTune. The Independent pointed out that the first verse swaps the original's New York City setting for Toronto and mentions Dundas Square. Drake's verse includes lines about showing a friend a girl's Instagram and about double-dating. Complex described the track as closer to a skit than a conventional song, and an inside joke that works best for people from Toronto.

== Reception ==
Reaction on social media was largely disbelief or mockery. A clip of Drake's verse posted by the NFR Podcast had about 27 million views within a day. Wired's Angela Watercutter wrote that the Plain White T's had given Drake a "plain old L", noting that some listeners thought it was AI and the band cringed.

HotNewHipHop called the choice of song baffling and said it would give Drake's critics material for a long time. Billboard's Angel Diaz said he struggled with the release, particularly so soon after the Lamar feud, but admitted the song was funny. Complex's Jordan Rose called the song bad but wrote that it was meant to be, since Snowd4y is a comedian and it was never aimed at being a serious Drake feature. HipHopCanada described it as a satirical meme track.

=== AI speculation ===
Many listeners assumed Drake's verse was AI-generated. Forbes and Complex tied the suspicion to Drake's use of AI-generated voices of Tupac Shakur and Snoop Dogg on "Taylor Made Freestyle" during the Lamar feud. Drake and his representatives did not address the question directly at first. The Instagram Story post was read as an endorsement and not a confirmation. Billboard later reported that Drake and his team had confirmed the song was real.

The Plain White T's posted a video of themselves hearing the song for the first time. Frontman Tom Higgenson said "That's not Drake" as the verse played, and bandmate Mike Retondo agreed. Higgenson later reposted social media posts about the song on his Instagram Story and asked what was going on.

Billboard sent the track to two companies that detect AI audio. Ircam Amplify said it found some traces of generative AI but that the track had been heavily mixed. Pex said the voice did not match Drake's official releases as closely as expected, but was close enough that it could be either Drake or a good AI copy. Pex noted that its tool alone could not tell real vocals from AI ones. A Drake representative declined to comment.

== Live performance ==
Drake performed the song live for the first time on August 2, 2024, during PartyNextDoor's concert in Toronto. He took over the stage for an hour-long R&B set that opened with his 2015 remix of Ramriddlz's "Sweeterman", then moved into "Wah Gwan Delilah".
