= BBL Drizzy =

2024 song by Metro Boomin

Instrumental by Metro Boomin
- Released: May 5, 2024
- Genre: Instrumental hip hop
- Length: 3:24
- Label: Self-released
- Songwriters: Metro Boomin; King Willonius; Udio AI
- Producer: Metro Boomin

"BBL Drizzy" (released as the file name "BBL DRIZZY BPM 150.mp3") is a "diss track beat" released by the American record producer Metro Boomin on May 5, 2024, in response to the Drake–Kendrick Lamar feud. It samples "BBL Drizzy", an artificial intelligence (AI)-generated track mocking the Canadian rapper Drake released on April 14 by the comedian King Willonius. The phrase was coined by the American rapper Rick Ross in reference to a rumor that Drake received plastic surgery on his abs and nose, using the slang term "BBL", an acronym for Brazilian butt lift, and "Drizzy", a nickname for Drake.

"BBL Drizzy" is the first notable example of AI sampling in mainstream hip-hop music, according to Billboard. Metro announced he would offer a free beat and a $10,000 cash prize to whoever delivered the best rap over the beat. "BBL Drizzy" quickly went viral, generating more than 3.4 million streams on SoundCloud within a week.

== Background ==
The Canadian rapper Drake and the American rapper Kendrick Lamar have been involved in a highly publicized feud since 2013. In March 2024, the American record producer Metro Boomin became involved in the feud after he, Lamar, and the rapper Future released the song "Like That", in which Lamar disses Drake. In April 2024, Drake released the song "Push Ups", in which he tells Metro to "shut your hoe ass up and make some drums". Drake further antagonizes Metro in "Family Matters", released in May.

In "Push Ups", Drake also dissed the American rapper Rick Ross: "Can't believe he jumpin' in, this nigga turnin' 50 / Every song that made it on the chart, he got from Drizzy / Spend that lil' check you got and stay up out my business". Ross responded with the diss track "Champagne Moments" and coined the phrase "BBL Drizzy" while promoting it on Twitter and Instagram. The phrase references a rumor that Drake received plastic surgery on his abs and on his nose, using the slang term "BBL" (an acronym for Brazilian butt lift). Inspired by Ross's posts, the comedian Willonius Hatcher, who goes by King Willonius online, released an AI-generated R&B parody song, "BBL Drizzy". The song was created using Udio, a generative artificial intelligence model that produces music. Hatcher stated that he initially experimented with different music genres including country, Afrobeats and yacht rock before settling on R&B.

== Release ==
On May 5, 2024, Metro responded to "Family Matters" by releasing an instrumental, "BBL DRIZZY 150 BPM.mp3", sampling "BBL Drizzy", on SoundCloud. Metro was unaware that the sampled track was AI-generated. He announced a contest on social media: whoever produced the best freestyle rap over the beat would receive a free beat. The beat quickly went viral, with users on TikTok, Instagram, and Twitter sharing songs recorded over it. On May 6, Metro announced that he would give the winner US$10,000, and a runner-up would also receive a beat. Within a week, the beat received more than 3.3 million streams on SoundCloud and maintained the number one spot on the platform's "New and Hot" chart. Commercially, “BBL Drizzy” peaked at number 22 on the New Zealand Hot Singles chart.

== Reception ==
Upon release, the track immediately received widespread attention on social media platforms. Notable celebrities and internet personalities including Elon Musk and Dr. Miami reacted to the beat. Several corporations also responded, including educational technology company Duolingo and meat producer Oscar Mayer.

In addition to users releasing freestyle raps over the instrumental, the track also evolved into a viral phenomenon where users would create remixes of the song beyond the hip hop genre. Many recreated the song in other genres, including house, merengue and Bollywood. Users also created covers of the song on a variety of musical instruments, including saxophone, guitar and harp.

=== Use of artificial intelligence ===
"BBL Drizzy" prompted widespread discussion regarding the use of generative artificial intelligence to create art and music. It is the first notable example of an AI-generated song being used as a sample in commercial music production. The acceptance of the song by the general public despite controversies surrounding AI art has prompted discussion regarding potential ramifications of a growth in commercial music utilizing AI.

== Aftermath ==
Immediately following the release of "BBL Drizzy", Drake responded in an Instagram comment, asking if Metro had really "cheffed a beat about [his] ass". Later, on May 24, Drake appeared on rapper Sexyy Red's mixtape, In Sexyy We Trust. On this project, Drake would rap over the "BBL Drizzy" instrumental on the song "U My Everything".

A copyright infringement lawsuit was filed against Udio, the AI startup used to create the diss track, by the Recording Industry Association of America in June 2024 following the viral success of the original track.

== Charts ==
| Chart (2024) | Peak position |
|---|---|
| New Zealand Hot Singles (RMNZ) | 22 |
