= Hellcats SRTs =

2023 single by Sexyy Red

- Cover art for the official remix

Single by Sexyy Red

from the album Hood Hottest Princess
- Released: September 15, 2023
- Genre: Crunk
- Length: 2:33
- Label: Open Shift
- Songwriters: Janae Wherry; Ernest Day Jr.
- Producer: Shawn Ferrari

Sexyy Red singles chronology
"Bing Bong (Remix)" (2023)	"Hellcats SRTs" (2023)	"Big Dawg" (2023)

Lil Durk singles chronology
"F*ck U Thought" (2023)	"Hellcats SRTs" (2023)	"Guitar in My Room" (2023)

Music video
- "Hellcats SRTs" on YouTube
- "Hellcats SRTs 2" on YouTube

"Hellcats SRTs" is a song by American rapper Sexyy Red, released on June 9, 2023, from her mixtape Hood Hottest Princess and produced by Shawn Ferrari. An official remix of the song titled "Hellcats SRTs 2" with American rapper Lil Durk was released on September 15, 2023. The title of the song refers to the SRT Hellcat model of Dodge Challenger.

== Content ==
The song is about Sexyy Red being sexually attracted to men who speed in cars and her love of smoking marijuana.

== Critical reception ==
Alphonse Pierre of Pitchfork commented the song "will turn dancefloors into shouting matches. The beat is so thunderous that it sounds like you should be listening to it in an IMAX theater." Grant Jones of RapReviews gave a negative review, stating "You can't even distinguish the hook on 'Hellcats SRTs' without the beat telling you, as it's monotone throughout."

== Music video ==
The music video was released in July 2023. It sees Sexyy Red and her crew, including fellow rapper GloRilla, cruising through the streets and throwing money.

== Remix ==
On August 21, 2023, Lil Durk hinted at a collaboration with Sexyy Red on Twitter, followed by banter between the two. On August 29, Sexyy Red confirmed a remix of "Hellcats SRTs" with Lil Durk, which was later released on September 15, 2023, as "Hellcats SRTs 2". On the remix, Durk's lyrics are similar in topic to that of Red's. Chris DeVille of Stereogum wrote, "Despite Durk's pop-chart pedigree and Sexyy's status as one of this year's breakout rap stars, this partnership does not scan as crossover pandering. Shawn Ferrari's beat remains as gloriously ugly as before, and there's no hook to speak of, just two charismatic emcees going in over music built for lo-fi YouTube videos and Datpiff-era mixtapes."

=== Music video ===
A music video was released alongside the remix. It sees Sexyy Red and Lil Durk speeding in a car and showing off cash.

== Charts ==
Chart performance for "Hellcats SRTs 2"
Chart (2023)	Peak position
US Bubbling Under Hot 100 (Billboard)	1
US Hot R&B/Hip-Hop Songs (Billboard)	40
