= Hood Hottest Princess =

Mixtape by Sexyy Red
- Released: June 9, 2023
- Genre: Hip hop
- Length: 30:19
- Labels: Open Shift; Gamma.
- Producers: Don Alfonso; ATL Jacob; BanBwoi; MacFly Beatz; Captain Curt; DJ Meech; DJ Paul; Shawn Ferrari; Omar Guetfa; Juicy J; Jupyter; Tay Keith; Melz; menace; NoahInHisBag; Okazaki; TheRechordz; ToddGleeFul; Truebeatzz; YakBeats

Sexyy Red chronology
Pound Town (2023)	Hood Hottest Princess (2023)	In Sexyy We Trust (2024)

Singles from Hood Hottest Princess
- 1. "Born By the River" Released: August 9, 2022; 2. "Female Gucci Mane" Released: April 21, 2023; 3. "Pound Town 2" Released: May 26, 2023; 4. "SkeeYee" Released: June 9, 2023; 5. "Hellcats SRTs" Released: September 15, 2023

Hood Hottest Princess is the second mixtape by American rapper and singer-songwriter Sexyy Red. Released on June 9, 2023, via Open Shift, the mixtape was supported by the singles "Born By the River", "Female Gucci Mane", "Pound Town 2", "SkeeYee" and "Hellcats SRTs", and has received positive reception from critics. The mixtape contains guest appearances from Nicki Minaj, Juicy J, ATL Jacob, and Sukihana. A deluxe edition was released on December 1, 2023 and featured additional guest appearances from Chief Keef, 42 Dugg, G Herbo and Summer Walker.

== Reception ==
=== Critical reception ===
Editors at AllMusic rated this album 2.5 out of 5 stars, with a staff review writing that the album has "brazen yet humorous lyrics and simple, gleeful hooks". Jude Noel of HipHopDX rated this release a 3.9 out of 5, comparing the work to Three 6 Mafia and continuing that it "is packed back to front with hard-hitting nu-crunk energy and pornographic quotables". The staff of Okayplayer published individual picks for the year on July 12 and editorial director Dimas Sanfiorenzo chose this as his top album and it placed third for culture and news editor Elijah Watson, Sr. Alphonse Pierre of Pitchfork scored Hood Hottest Princess an 8.0 out of 10, noting that you could play the album "at a party or club without killing the vibe; it's 30 minutes of straight-up standing-on-the-table raps".

Walden Green of The Fader reviewed "SkeeYee" and called it the "song you need in your life today", for Sexyy Red's vocals and Tay Keith's instrumentation.

Hood Hottest Princess in best-of lists
Outlet	Listing	Rank
BrooklynVegan	BrooklynVegan's Top 55 Albums of 2023	—N/a
The Fader	The 50 Best albums of 2023	13
NPR Music	The 50 Best Albums of 2023	—N/a
Pitchfork	The 50 Best Albums of 2023	41
Slate	The best albums of 2023.	Runner-up
Stereogum	The 50 Best Albums of 2023	46

== Track listing ==
Hood Hottest Princess track listing
No.	Title	Writer(s)	Producer(s)	Length
1.	"I'm The Shit"	Janae Wherry; Paul Williams	Mac Fly	2:32
2.	"SkeeYee"	Wherry; Brytavious Chambers; Demetrius Moore; Marquell Jones	Tay Keith; DJ Meech; BanBwoi	2:37
3.	"Hellcats SRTs"	Wherry; Ernest Day Jr.	Shawn Ferrari	2:24
4.	"Pound Town 2" (with Tay Keith and Nicki Minaj)	Wherry; Chambers; Onika Maraj	Tay Keith	3:14
5.	"Looking For The Hoes (Ain’t My Fault)"	Wherry; Wolf-Alfonso Hasselmann; Armel Potter; Craig Bazile; Jean Marcel Day Jr.; Adnan Khan; Wardell Quezergue; Vyshonn Miller; Joseph Smokey Johnson	Don Alfonso; Melz; Truebeatzz; Menace	2:11
6.	"Sexyy Walk"	Wherry; Jordan Houston; Paul Beauregard	Juicy J; DJ Paul	2:34
7.	"Strictly for the Strippers" (with Juicy J and ATL Jacob)	Wherry; Houston; Jacob Canady; Omar Guetfa	ATL Jacob; Omar Guetfa	4:02
8.	"Nachos"	Wherry; OKAZAKI; NOAHINHISBAG	OKAZAKI; NOAHINHISBAG	2:51
9.	"Mad at Me"	Wherry; Chambers; Ayatullah Muhammad; Elon Brown; Juan Madrid; Donny Flores; Antoine Edwards; Christopher Lee	Tay Keith; TheRechordz; Jupyter	2:39
10.	"Born By the River" (with Sukihana)	Wherry; Destiny Henderson; Licurtis Philson	Yak Beats; Captain Curt	2:35
11.	"Female Gucci Mane"	Wherry; Day Jr.; Todd Gleeful	Shawn Ferrari; ToddGleeFul	2:30
Total length:				30:19

Deluxe edition (bonus tracks)
No.	Title	Writer(s)	Producer(s)	Length
12.	"Sexyy Red For President"	Wherry; David Doman; Ryan Press; Daniel Levin; Madrid	D.A. Got That Dope	2:21
13.	"Bow Bow Bow (F My Baby Dad)"	Wherry; Chambers; Moore	Tay Keith; DJ Meech	2:20
14.	"Ghetto Princess" (with Chief Keef)	Wherry; Keith Cozart; Day Jr.; Gleeful; Michael Len Williams II	Shawn Ferrari; ToddGleeFul; Mike Will Made It	3:38
15.	"Sexyy Please"	Wherry; Williams	Mac Fly	2:58
16.	"Hold On Yeah"	Wherry; Eddie Espinal; Zavion Storey; Eli Haire; prodandree	Clipzy Beats; RichZay; Uno Reyes; prodandree	2:26
17.	"Shake Yo Dreads"	Wherry; Murphy McCleery; AyoCBass	Kat Lightning; AyoCBass	2:58
18.	"Perfect Match" (with 42 Dugg and G Herbo)	Wherry; Dion Hayes; Herbert Wright III; Williams II	Mike Will Made It	3:40
19.	"Free My Nigga"	Wherry; Rasool Diaz; Martin Pitt; Press; Madrid	Sool Got Hits; Pitt Tha Kid; Zone	2:09
20.	"I Might" (with Summer Walker)	Wherry; Summer Walker; Benjamin Diehl; Jacob Hindlin; Phil Phever; Nija Charles; Kiddo Al; Sam Roman	Ben Billions; Jacob Kasher; Phil Phever	2:56
21.	"I Don't Wanna Be Saved" (with Tay Keith)	Wherry; Chambers; Jake Fridkis; Houston; Beauregard; Earl Stevens; Brandt Jones; Tenina Stevens; Marvin Whitemon	Tay Keith; Jake Fridkis	2:38
22.	"Hood Rats" (with Sukihana)	Wherry; Henderson; Chambers; Moore	Tay Keith; DJ Meech	2:55
Total length:				61:18

== Personnel ==
- Sexyy Red – rapping, vocals
- 42 Dugg – rapping on "Perfect Match"
- Don Alfonso – production on "Looking for the Hoes (Ain't My Fault)"
- ATL Jacob – vocals on "Strictly for the Strippers"
- BanBwoi – production on "SkeeYee"
- MacFly Beatz – production on "I'm the Shit"
- Captain Curt – production on "Born by the River"
- Chief Keef – rapping on "Ghetto Princess" featuring
- DJ Meech – production on "SkeeYee"
- DJ Paul – production on "Sexyy Walk"
- Shawn Ferrari – production on "Hellcats SRTs" and "Female Gucci Mane"
- G Herbo – rapping on "Perfect Match"
- Juicy J – vocals on "Strictly for the Strippers", production on "Sexyy Walk"
- Jupyter – production on "Mad at Me"
- Tay Keith – piano on "Pound Town 2"; Roland 808 on "Pound Town 2"; performance on "I Don't Wanna Be Saved", production on "SkeeYee", "Pound Town 2", and "Mad at Me"
- Melz – production on "Looking for the Hoes (Ain't My Fault)"
- menace – production on "Looking for the Hoes (Ain't My Fault)"
- Nicki Minaj – vocals on "Pound Town 2"
- NoahInHisBag – production on "Nachos"
- Okazaki – production on "Nachos"
- TheRechordz – production on "Mad at Me"
- Sukihana – vocals on "Born by the River" and "Hoodrats"
- ToddGleeful – production on "Female Gucci Mane"
- Truebeatzz – production on "Looking for the Hoes (Ain't My Fault)"
- Summer Walker – vocals on "I Might"
- YakBeatz – production on "Born by the River"

== Personnel ==
- Sexyy Red – rapping, vocals
- Latajashanna Irvin (LaLa Irvin) – rapping on "Perfect Match"
- Don Alfonso – production on "Looking for the Hoes (Ain't My Fault)"
- ATL Jacob – vocals on "Strictly for the Strippers"
- BanBwoi – production on "SkeeYee"
- MacFly Beatz – production on "I'm the Shit"
- Captain Curt – production on "Born by the River"
- Chief Keef – rapping on "Ghetto Princess" featuring
- DJ Meech – production on "SkeeYee"
- DJ Paul – production on "Sexyy Walk"
- Shawn Ferrari – production on "Hellcats SRTs" and "Female Gucci Mane"
- G Herbo – rapping on "Perfect Match"
- Juicy J – vocals on "Strictly for the Strippers", production on "Sexyy Walk"
- Jupyter – production on "Mad at Me"
- Tay Keith – piano on "Pound Town 2"; Roland 808 on "Pound Town 2"; performance on "I Don't Wanna Be Saved", production on "SkeeYee", "Pound Town 2", and "Mad at Me"
- Melz – production on "Looking for the Hoes (Ain't My Fault)"
- menace – production on "Looking for the Hoes (Ain't My Fault)"
- Nicki Minaj – vocals on "Pound Town 2"
- NoahInHisBag – production on "Nachos"
- Okazaki – production on "Nachos"
- TheRechordz – production on "Mad at Me"
- Sukihana – vocals on "Born by the River" and "Hoodrats"
- ToddGleeful – production on "Female Gucci Mane"
- Truebeatzz – production on "Looking for the Hoes (Ain't My Fault)"
- Summer Walker – vocals on "I Might"
- YakBeatz – production on "Born by the River"

== Charts ==
=== Weekly charts ===
Weekly chart performance for Hood Hottest Princess
Chart (2023)	Peak position
US Billboard 200	62
US Top R&B/Hip-Hop Albums (Billboard)	21

=== Year-end charts ===
Year-end chart performance for Hood Hottest Princess
Chart (2024)	Position
US Billboard 200	156
US Top R&B/Hip-Hop Albums (Billboard)	54

== Certifications ==
Certifications for Hood Hottest Princess
Region	Certification	Certified units/sales
United States (RIAA) Deluxe edition	Gold	500,000^{‡}
^{‡} Sales+streaming figures based on certification alone.

== See also ==
- 2023 in American music
- 2023 in hip hop music
