= U My Everything =

Single by Sexyy Red and Drake

from the album In Sexyy We Trust
- Released: June 25, 2024
- Length: 3:45
- Label: Open Shift; Gamma
- Songwriters: Janae Wherry; Aubrey Graham; Willonius Hatcher
- Producers: Tay Keith; Jake Fridkis; Luh Ron

Sexyy Red singles chronology
"FTCU" (SleezeMix) (2024)	"U My Everything" (2024)	"N.P.O." (2024)

Drake singles chronology
"Wah Gwan Delilah" (2024)	"U My Everything" (2024)	"Hot Uptown" (2024)

"U My Everything" is a song by American rapper Sexyy Red and Canadian rapper Drake. It was sent to US rhythmic radio through Open Shift and Gamma as the second and final single from Sexyy's third mixtape, In Sexyy We Trust. The song was produced by Tay Keith, Jake Fridkis, and Luh Ron. Both artists wrote it together; King Willonius is also credited as a songwriter as the song contains a sample of his 2024 song, "BBL Drizzy", which was created as a comedy diss towards Drake, who raps over the sample. "U My Everything" marks the second collaboration between Sexxy Red and Drake, following the latter's single, "Rich Baby Daddy", which also features American singer-songwriter SZA, from his eighth studio album, For All the Dogs (2023).

== Background ==
On May 24, 2024, Sexyy Red released her third project, a mixtape titled In Sexyy We Trust through Gamma and Open Shift, it features "U My Everything", a song where Sexyy Red teamed with Canadian rapper Drake. The rappers flow over a sample flip of Jamie Foxx's 1994 single "Infatuation" from his album, Peep This, until the beat switches during Drake's verse, which samples an artificial intelligence-generated R&B parody song "BBL Drizzy" by King Willonius, a song Metro Boomin would sample for his instrumental diss record, "BBL Drizzy", aimed at Drake following their ongoing rap feud released in early May 2024.

== Critical reception ==
Billboard's editor Angel Diaz wrote that they "like the song", and that it was a "calculated move" by Drake, in reference to his feud with Kendrick Lamar. Others, such as TheGrio's Touré, criticized the song, wondering if "maybe Kendrick Lamar has stolen Drake and J. Cole's powers?"

== Charts ==
=== Weekly charts ===
Weekly chart performance for "U My Everything"
Chart (2024)	Peak position
Canada Hot 100 (Billboard)	70
Global 200 (Billboard)	132
New Zealand Hot Singles (RMNZ)	6
South Africa (TOSAC)	69
US Billboard Hot 100	44
US Hot R&B/Hip-Hop Songs (Billboard)	12
US Rhythmic Airplay (Billboard)	12

=== Year-end charts ===
2024 year-end chart performance for "U My Everything"
Chart (2024)	Position
US Hot R&B/Hip-Hop Songs (Billboard)	48

== Certifications ==
Certifications for "U My Everything"
Region	Certification	Certified units/sales
United States (RIAA)	Gold	500,000^{‡}
^{‡} Sales+streaming figures based on certification alone.

== Release history ==
Release dates and formats for "U My Everything"
Region	Date	Format(s)	Label(s)	Ref.
United States	June 25, 2024	Rhythmic crossover	Rebel; Open Shift	
