= F*ck U Thought =

2023 single by Lil Durk

Single by Lil Durk
- Released: August 18, 2023
- Length: 3:18
- Label: Only the Family; Alamo
- Songwriters: Durk Banks; Darrell Jackson
- Producer: Chopsquad DJ

Lil Durk singles chronology
"Stand by Me" (2023)	"F*ck U Thought" (2023)	"Hellcats SRTs 2" (2023)

Music video
- "F*ck U Thought" on YouTube

"F*ck U Thought" is a single by American rapper Lil Durk. It was released through Only the Family and Alamo Records as a single on August 18, 2023. It was produced by Chopsquad DJ. The song contains a simple piano melody, over which Durk raps about having worked hard to reach success and not wanting to take any losses in his current situation. The official music video was released alongside the single and sees Durk dressed in designer clothing as he shows off his chains and money.

== Charts ==
Chart performance for "F*ck U Thought"
Chart (2023)	Peak position
US Billboard Hot 100	77
US Hot R&B/Hip-Hop Songs (Billboard)	26

== Certifications ==
Certifications for "F*ck U Thought"
Region	Certification	Certified units/sales
United States (RIAA)	Gold	500,000^{‡}
^{‡} Sales+streaming figures based on certification alone.
