= DearALICE =

British boy band

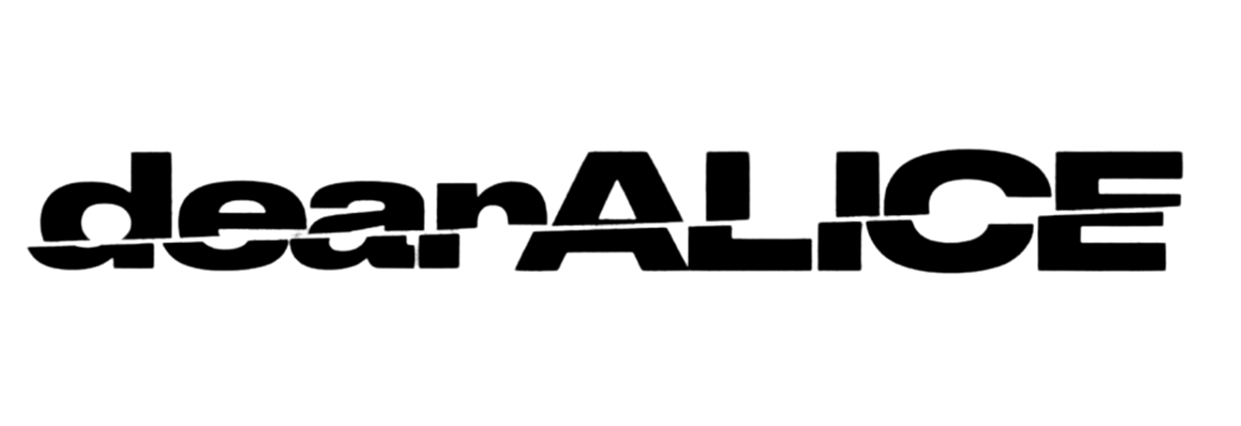
- Official logo

Background information
- Origin: South Korea & the United Kingdom
- Years active: 2023–present
- Labels: Gamma; SM
- Member of: SM Town
- Members: Dexter Greenwood; Oliver "Olly" Quinn; Reese Carter; Blaise Noon
- Past members: James Sharp
- Website: dearalice.co.uk

DearALICE (Note: ALICE is an abbreviation for "A Love I Can't Explain". (see § Name)) (stylised as dearALICE) is a British boy band managed by Moon&Back Media and consists of members Dexter Greenwood, Oliver "Olly" Quinn, Reese Carter, and Blaise Noon. Formed by South Korean agencies SM Entertainment x Kakao Entertainment, and British television production company Moon&Back Media in 2024, the group starred in the BBC One show Made in Korea: The K-Pop Experience. They released their debut song "Ariana" on 21 February 2025.

== Name ==
The name "DearALICE" (previously stylised as "Dear Alice") was revealed on 17 August 2024. The band received inspiration for the group name after eating at a restaurant of the same name in Itaewon. The name is described as "a letter to their fans" with ALICE standing for "A Love I Can't Explain."

== History ==
=== 2023–2024: Formation ===
In November 2023, SM Entertainment signed a partnership with British television production company Moon&Back Media to launch a new UK-based boy group.

In July 2024, the reality show Made in Korea: The K-Pop Experience was announced to be aired in August on BBC One and iPlayer. The series consists of six episodes, each one showcasing the journey of the five British members joining a hundred-day long K-Pop training program in South Korea and their evaluations from Yoon Hee Jun, a director at SM's Artist Development Center. In August, through a press conference of the reality show in London, the group's name was announced and the five members were formally introduced to the public.

On 31 October, it was announced that the original soundtrack Made in Korea: The K-Pop Experience (Original TV Soundtrack), which contained six songs performed on the reality show, would release on November 1st. On 3 November, DearALICE performed their song "Best Day of Our Lives" on the British dance competition show Strictly Come Dancing. The soundtrack charted number one on the UK Official Soundtrack Albums Chart after a week of being released. On 7 November, the group signed a contract with US label Gamma for their global activities.

=== 2025–present: Debut and bitterSWEETsummer ===
From 12 to 13 January 2025, DearALICE attended SM Entertainment's 30th anniversary concert SM Town Live 2025: The Culture, the Future in Seoul, where they premiered their debut song "Ariana", which was released on February 21. On 16 January, the group performed the song again on Mnet's M Countdown, a South Korean music show. They later released their second single "Sweet" on May 23. DearALICE's debut EP bitterSWEETsummer was released on June 27, alongside its single "Save Us".

== Members ==
- Dexter Greenwood
- Oliver "Olly" Quinn
- Reese Carter
- Blaise Noon

=== Former members ===
- James Sharp (2023-2026)

== Discography ==
=== Extended plays ===
List of extended plays, with selected details and chart positions
Title	Details	Peak chart positions		
Title	Details	SCO	UK Indie	UK Sales
BitterSweetSummer	Released: June 27, 2025; Label: Gamma; Format: CD, digital download, streaming	58	5	15

=== Soundtrack albums ===
List of soundtrack albums, with selected details and chart positions
Title	Details	Peak chart positions	
Title	Details	UK DL	UK Sound.
Made in Korea: The K-Pop Experience OST	Released: November 1, 2024; Label: Gamma; Formats: CD, digital download, streaming	8	1

=== Singles ===
List of singles, showing year released, selected chart positions, and name of the album
Title	Year	Peaks	Album
Title	Year	UK Sales	Album
"Ariana"	2025	3	Non-album singles
"Sweet"	2025	—	bitterSWEETsummer
"Save Us"	2025	—	bitterSWEETsummer
"Body On"	2026	—	Dancefloorkilla
"Home With You"	2026	—	Dancefloorkilla
"—" denotes a recording that did not chart in that territory.

== Concerts ==
=== Headline ===
- DearALICE Live (2025)
- DearALICE Tour 2026 (2026)

=== Concerts Participation ===
- SMTOWN Live 2025 (2025)
- SMTOWN Live 2025 In Mexico City (2025)
- SMTOWN Live in L.A 2025 (2025)
- SMTOWN Live in London 2025 (2025)
- Sapshow (2026)
- BST Hyde Park (2026)
