= Made in Korea: The K-Pop Experience =

- Genre: Reality television
- Starring: Blaise Noon; Dexter Greenwood; James Sharp; Olly Quinn; Reese Carter
- Narrated by: Vick Hope
- Countries of origin: United Kingdom; South Korea
- Original languages: English; Korean
- No. of seasons: 1
- No. of episodes: 6

Production
- Executive producer: Kalpna Patel-Knight
- Producers: Nigel Hall; Russ Lindsay; Dawn Airey
- Running time: 44 mins
- Production companies: SM Entertainment; Moon&Back Media; Kakao Entertainment America

Original release
- Network: BBC One; BBC iPlayer
- Release: 17 August – 21 September 2024

Related
- DearALICE

Made in Korea: The K-Pop Experience is a British reality television show starring British boy band dearALICE. Produced under SM Entertainment, Moon&Back Media and Kakao Entertainment America.

== Members ==
- Blaise Noon
- Dexter Greenwood
- James Sharp
- Olly Quinn
- Reese Carter

== Production ==
In July 2024, the reality show was announced by BBC. Principal photography took place in South Korea over three months. The press conference was held on 2 August 2024 at the Soho Hotel in London. The members appeared on the live talk show This Morning.

== Soundtrack ==
Released on 1 November 2024
No.	Title	Length
1.	"Vibes"	3:09
2.	"Solar"	3:14
3.	"Life is a Movie"	3:09
4.	"Classic"	2:14
5.	"Time With You"	4:14
6.	"Best Day of Our Lives"	2:57
Total length:		18:57

== Release ==
It aired on BBC One from 17 August 2024 to 21 September 2024, and received mixed reviews from critics.

== Reception ==
On the review aggregator website Rotten Tomatoes, 60% of 5 critics' reviews are positive, with an average rating of 3.2/10.

Emily Baker from The i Paper gave the show 1/5. Anita Singh of The Telegraph awarded 2/5 stars. Katelyn Mensah of Radio Times and Barbara Ellen of The Guardian both rated the show 3 out of 5 stars.
