= In Sexyy We Trust =

Mixtape by Sexyy Red
- Released: May 24, 2024
- Length: 33:09
- Label: Open Shift; Gamma.
- Producer: Tay Keith

Sexyy Red chronology
Hood Hottest Princess (2023)	In Sexyy We Trust (2024)	Yo Favorite Trappa Favorite Rappa (2026)

Singles from In Sexyy We Trust
- 1. "Get It Sexyy" Released: March 15, 2024; 2. "U My Everything" Released: June 25, 2024

In Sexyy We Trust is the third mixtape by American rapper and singer-songwriter Sexyy Red. It was released through Open Shift and Gamma on May 24, 2024. The mixtape contains guest appearances from Drake, Mike Will Made It, VonOff1700, and Lil Baby. Production on the record was handled by Mike Will Made It and Tay Keith, alongside other record producers. The mixtape was supported by two singles, "Get It Sexyy" and the Drake-assisted "U My Everything", the latter being notable for sampling "BBL Drizzy". The album title is a pun on the United States motto, "In God We Trust".

== Track listing ==
All tracks are written by Sexyy Red, except where noted.

In Sexyy We Trust track listing
No.	Title	Producer(s)	Length
1.	"Tim Talking"		0:24
2.	"She's Back"	Yak Beats; Zodiak	2:42
3.	"Boss Me Up"	Tay Keith	2:15
4.	"U My Everything" (with Drake)	Tay Keith; Jake Fridkis; Luh Ron	3:45
5.	"Ova Bad"		2:11
6.	"Get It Sexyy"	Tay Keith; Fridkis	2:28
7.	"Fake Jammin"	Tay Keith; Keke 808	2:19
8.	"Outside" (featuring Mike Will Made It)	Mike Will Made It	2:31
9.	"Sexyy Love Money" (featuring VonOff1700)	Tay Keith	2:44
10.	"Sport"	Noc; Tyler Cates	1:46
11.	"TTG (Go)"	Tay Keith	2:20
12.	"Lick Me" (with Lil Baby)	C Clips Beatz	2:28
13.	"Awesome Jawsome"	Tay Keith	2:49
14.	"It's My Birthday"	Tay Keith	2:27
Total length:			33:09

== Charts ==
=== Weekly charts ===
Weekly chart performance for In Sexyy We Trust
Chart (2024)	Peak position
Canadian Albums (Billboard)	80
US Billboard 200	17
US Top R&B/Hip-Hop Albums (Billboard)	5

=== Year-end charts ===
Year-end chart performance for In Sexyy We Trust
Chart (2024)	Position
US Top R&B/Hip-Hop Albums (Billboard)	77
