= KenTheMan =

American rapper from Texas

- Born: Kentavia Tytiana Miller; June 7, 1994 (age 32); Houston, Texas, U.S.
- Occupation: Rapper
- Label: Roc Nation
- Children: 1

Kentavia Tytiana Miller (born June 7, 1994), known professionally as KenTheMan, is an American rapper. In 2022, she was selected for the XXL magazine's Annual Freshman Class list. That same year, she released the single "Not My Nigga", which became viral on TikTok. In the following year, she signed with Jay-Z's Roc Nation. Despite her stage name, Miller is female.

== Early life ==
Kentavia Miller was born in Houston, Texas in 1994.

== Career ==
KenTheMan's stage name was originally an alter ego. While signing up for the music platform SoundCloud as an artist, she wanted to use the name "Ken", but noticed there were already many people on the platform operating under that name. She opted to use the aforementioned stage name instead. After completing high school, KenTheMan enrolled in college. She dropped out, but later re-enrolled in music courses, believing that discomfort would make her into a better musician. She dropped out again after deciding the approach wasn't working out well, and agreeing with her father that she would enroll once again if being a rapper didn't work out.

Initially working jobs as a waitress, KenTheMan worked as a delivery woman for the food service app DoorDash. She wrote the song "He Be Like" while working. The song became KenTheMan's first success as an artist. In 2021, she released the project What's My Name. It was ranked by Rolling Stone as the 16th best hip-hop album of the year. On October 14, 2022, KenTheMan released the single "Not My Nigga".

== Personal life ==
Miller is a mother. She grew up in Acres Homes in Houston,Tx.

== Discography ==
- 4 da 304's (2020)
- What's My Name (2021)
- Back To 304'n (2023)
- Kinda Famous (2025)
