= SkeeYee =

2023 single by Sexyy Red

Single by Sexyy Red

from the album Hood Hottest Princess
- Released: June 9, 2023
- Genre: Dirty rap; crunk
- Length: 2:37
- Label: Open Shift
- Songwriters: Janae Wherry; Brytavious Chambers; Demetrius Moore; Marquell Jones
- Producers: Tay Keith; DJ Meech; BanBwoi

Sexyy Red singles chronology
"Pound Town 2" (2023)	"SkeeYee" (2023)	"Shiesty" (2023)

Music video
- "SkeeYee" on YouTube

"SkeeYee" is a song by American rapper Sexyy Red. It was released on June 9, 2023, as the fourth single from her mixtape Hood Hottest Princess with an accompanying music video. The song was produced by Tay Keith, DJ Meech and BanBwoi.

The song was the first to top the TikTok Billboard Top 50 chart after its creation. The song was ranked as Best Rap Song of 2023 by Rolling Stone.

== Background ==
In terms of the lyrics, the meaning of the title has been described as: "It's when you tell a guy to pull up, and also when you swerve him anyway — he wants to fuck with you but you've got him stuck. SkeeYee is the baddest bitch showing up to the club, single-handedly turning the party, and the sound of the jewelry on her wrist."

The song garnered popularity on the video-sharing app TikTok before it was officially released, through a trend in which users aggressively whip their hair as the ad-lib "skee-yee" is heard.

The song also garnered popularity in professional wrestling in October 2023 when X user @HaangEmHiigh shared an edited video of WWE wrestler Jey Uso hyping up the crowd with the song playing over it. The video caught Red's attention with Uso responding by extending a WWE invitation to Red. Red eventually made an appearance in WWE on the May 28, 2024, episode of WWE NXT to unveil the newly created NXT Women's North American Championship belt. It was also announced that she will be the host of WWE's premium live event NXT Battleground on June 9.

== Composition ==
The production of the song consists of pianos and 808s.

== Critical reception ==
Walden Green of The Fader gave a favorable review of the song, writing that Sexyy Red "delivers her bodacious bars in this ridiculous flow — a little bit Carti, a little bit Uzi, hot-wired for maximum Southern rap horsepower — but with so much confidence on the mic, it's hard not to buy the bad bitchery Red's selling." Green also commented it as having "hi-fi rap production that screams 'opulence, you own everything.'" Alphonse Pierre of Pitchfork stated that the song's hook is "so hypnotic and nutty, you'll probably be asking Why? until you just decide to give in." Elijah Watson, Sr. of Okayplayer described the hook as a moment on Hood Hottest Princess that has "given me a rush".

"SkeeYee" claimed the top spot on Rolling Stone's "Best Rap Songs of 2023". The commentary emphasized the emergence of "Regular Rap Girls" who prioritize grit over glamour and noted Sexyy Redd's authentic representation of her roots and experiences, praising her casual yet exciting flow. The production by Tay Keith was highlighted for its nostalgic elements, contributing to the widespread appeal of the song, described as both "silly" and extraordinary. In September 2024, Pitchfork included "SkeeYee" on their list of "The 100 Best Songs of the 2020s So Far", ranking it at number 37.

== Music video ==
The music video was previewed on social media a day before its release. It features a cameo from American rapper GloRilla. During filming, the NYPD stopped the shoot.

== Charts ==
=== Weekly charts ===
Weekly chart performance for "SkeeYee"
Chart (2023)	Peak position
US Billboard Hot 100	62
US Hot R&B/Hip-Hop Songs (Billboard)	17
US Rhythmic Airplay (Billboard)	13

=== Year-end charts ===
2023 year-end chart performance for "SkeeYee"
Chart (2023)	Position
US Hot R&B/Hip-Hop Songs (Billboard)	93

2024 year-end chart performance for "SkeeYee"
Chart (2024)	Position
US Hot R&B/Hip-Hop Songs (Billboard)	89

== Certifications ==
Certifications for "SkeeYee"
Region	Certification	Certified units/sales
United States (RIAA)	Platinum	1,000,000^{‡}
^{‡} Sales+streaming figures based on certification alone.
