= Raunch aesthetics =

Term in feminist theory

Raunch aesthetics is a term in feminist theory which describes the ways in which women in hip hop express their sexuality through the performance of lyrics, choreography, and staging. These aesthetics are performed by artists such as Lil’ Kim, Nicki Minaj, Rihanna, Ciara, Beyoncé, Doja Cat, Cardi B, Megan Thee Stallion, Sexyy Red, and Miley Cyrus with the intention to embrace and take control over their own bodies and sexual identities through verbal and physical expression.

== Historic background ==
In the 1960s and 1970s, American feminist women started to become labeled as anti-sex, anti-porn, anti-heterosexual, and prudish in general. It is believed that there was a strong link between power structures and male dominance in pornography. It wasn't until the 1990s and 2000s that pro-sex women who embraced sexuality became more predominant.

Hip hop emerged in the 1980s as an outlet for young African-American youth to replicate the experiences of urban life and marginalization. It created a space for groups to share and communicate their struggles living in highly populated areas with little resources available to them. Hip hoppers created and innovated new ways to manipulate music, their voices, and their bodies to showcase their talent and skills and gain respect within the community. The hip hop genre is overwhelmingly male-dominated and leaves women of color on the periphery or completely shut out; women are not taken as serious contributors even though they have always been prevalent in hip hop.

Some female rappers choose to incorporate a sex sells framework into their work to market their sexuality and be successful. Female rappers of the late 1990s began engaging in the increasingly hypersexualized genre, using it to gain cultural power and reverse the elevation of pimp roles weaved into many rap songs. Such raunch aesthetics were their source of power in the male dominated genre for many female artists such as Lil Kim.

Some artists use raunch aesthetics to critique the ways in which women's bodies are profoundly commodified and debased in the genre to the point that there is little mobility for women artists to express their experiences, gain respect, or even describe themselves as sexual beings without being labeled a "video ho".

== Feminists who support and those who critique ==
Feminists have long critiqued art for its focus on the male gaze and how it penetrates its multiple dimensions including who makes the art, who it is made for, and who and/or what it represents. There is a link between art and sexual politics including issues surrounding power and the influence the male gaze has on how women are viewed in life and art. The use of art reflects cultural standards within a society, and some feminists claim that art, especially film, was intended for the male consumption of pornified and sexualized women due to patriarchal beliefs mirrored in larger society.

The way in which a female hip hop artist uses her words and her body to exude her own sexual empowerment expressed through raunch may be critiqued by feminists who think this aesthetic can be harmful through the mimicry of sexual objectification of women's bodies in their music videos. There is some controversy over whether women are actively choosing to express their sexuality through the use of raunch or whether society is influencing women to internalize patriarchal ideas about how a woman should want to act, dress, and behave for attention. While most feminists would agree on the importance of female sexual empowerment, some do not agree on the paths taken toward sexual liberation. This is mainly because it's hard to decipher between real sexual empowerment and a false sense of it because the terms have been so com-modified in the United States to get women to consume various goods.

There is an important distinction made between a woman's subjective sense of sexual empowerment and society's influence over a woman's expression of sexuality. The prior implies a personal sense of power and the latter a political sense of power pertaining to how women are perceived and treated in a culture. The ways in which women find sexual empowerment are both important to consider to gain a more holistic view of female sexual entitlement because it includes the analysis of empowerment through subjective feelings of desire and pleasure as well as society's use of empowerment to market sexuality to young girls and women.

Some critics have voiced that these images and over-sexualization in music videos have contributed to a rape culture among the younger generations. They do not support women that "give into the system" to reap the benefits of making a great deal of money from their body image. The images of women barely clothed and performing sexual symbolism such as sucking on a lollipop or on other phallic symbols. The idea is that it gives young men and women the perception that every women should act like this. There is little respect shown in these videos with men slapping girls' buttocks and swiping credit cards through them, as depicted in the music video for the song Tip Drill by rapper Nelly.

It is believed that such portrayals have led to the increase in violence towards women because they are so common and have desensitized our society's perception towards violence. Hip hop uses these images because it sells and it is what the public consumes. Studies have shown that men who watched these videos are more accepting of violence against women and see them as sex objects.

It is believed that this distinction of accepted and unaccepted raunchiness chalks up to the idea "classism". Classism is differential treatment based on actual or perceived social status. It is the systematic oppression of subordinated class groups to advantage and strengthen others. It's the systematic assignment of characteristics of worth and ability based on society's perceptions.

== Raunch aesthetics and respectability ==
Raunch culture uses a process of repackaging old gender stereotypes and adding a choice which helps it resist critique by others. At the same time, because of the extreme sexual nature of raunch aesthetics, many in American culture see its practices as grotesque, explicit and vulgar.

In a hypersexualized society, sex is a commodity. But in terms of practicing raunch it isn't the sex that is problematic, but the "publicness" of the act. Over the years, hundreds of sexualized media depictions have flooded public areas of cities all over the world. At one point in time in the past, the sexualized functions in urban society were contained and kept hidden from public space. These sexualized functions have now moved into plain view of society.

The presence of raunch aesthetics has seeped into normal, unsexualized places such as family restaurants. An example of this is the hyper-sexualized restaurant called "Hooters". Its waitresses are dressed in a sexualized way, and with each required to have big breasts and "show them off" while she works.

Family restaurants aren't the only venues that have become hyper-sexualized. The simple non-sexual act of getting your car cleaned can now be a sexual experience where people can see hyper-sexualized women, dressed half naked, clean your car, and while you wait, you can even get a lap dance. These types of venues support sexual oppression and embrace negative stereotypes of women. Because of the public display of explicit behavior, the practice becomes dirty, inappropriate, and ultimately looked down upon. This is believed to has an effect on women and is the driving force towards their oppression, objectification and inequality. The stigmatization of raunch aesthetics has been linked to this and devalues women's genuine experiences and practices.

When women take part in activities that may be considered "slutty" or unladylike, they are condemned by society for not complying with the gender norms. However, recently through the use of hip hop and the media, women have been combating these norms thus making raunchy aesthetic more controversial in today's society.

It is clear that some women within the hip-hop realm are glorified for their raunchy performances over others. This is referred to in society as slut-shaming. Slut-shaming is the experience of being labeled as a sexually out-of-control girl or woman being punished socially for carrying out this identity. Due to this, there have been female artists who state their opinions about other female artists who engage in this behavior. Amber Rose, for example, has spoken out on this issue. She mentioned that the animosity that both she and Kim Kardashian receive on a daily basis for revealing themselves to the public is unfair, whereas Beyoncé twerks and wears clothes just as revealing clothes; yet the terms "hoe" or "porn star" are not used when referring to Beyoncé. Rose said that at the end of the day, each are women and that they should all embrace one other, and that no person is better. Rose has since spearheaded a movement in the U.S. known as the “Slut Walk”, which is a parade she has hosted every year since 2014. The Slut Walk originated in Toronto in 2011 after police told women to stop dressing like sluts if they wanted to avoid sexual assault. That narrative disgusted Rose and inspired her to become a voice against slut-shaming.

== Artists that practice raunch culture ==
=== Miley Cyrus ===
Miley Cyrus is an American actress and singer-songwriter. She has gained much attention for her sudden foray in sexual liberation. In 2013, she performed with musical artist Robin Thicke for a VMA performance in which she danced on stage appearing naked.

Many were outraged by Miley's performance, saying it was over the top and that grabbing her crotch and sticking out her tongue was too sexual to be on television. Cyndi Lauper commented,

"And there she is a young twenty-something trying to prove, you know, she can hang with the big boys and girls, you know, basically simulating a 'Girl Gone Wild' video onstage and I just felt like it was so beneath her and really. It was really raunchy. It wasn't even art. It was raunch."

Cyrus was also critiqued for appropriating twerking, a dance from African American culture that is performed by shaking the buttocks. Missy Elliott wrote a song called “WTF" that critiqued the performance.

=== Beyoncé ===
Beyoncé Knowles is an American singer-songwriter and actress. She performs raunch aesthetics through her explicit lyrics and her seductive dancing. In her song "Partition" from her self-titled album Beyoncé, which came out December 2013, she sings:

Driver roll up the partition please

I don't need you seeing 'yonce on her knees
Took 45 minutes to get all dressed up
We ain't even gonna make it to this club
Now my mascara running, red lipstick smudged
Oh he so horny, he want to fuck
He bucked all my buttons, he ripped my blouse

He Monica Lewinsky all on my gown

The song suggests the sexual act of fellatio while being driven in a limousine to a club party. Visually, in the music video, Beyoncé performs raunchiness by dancing seductively in diamond-studded leotards and heels. According to Hollywood.com, audience members were shocked at her over performance of raunchiness when she and her husband, Jay-Z, performed their song "Drunk in Love" at the 2014 Grammy's Award show. Her explicit lyrics are implicative of a sexual liberation that is often censored out by media. Dr. Marty Klein proposes that media is sensitive to eroticism because of the privatization of sex.

=== Rihanna ===
Robyn Rihanna Fenty is an American-based singer-songwriter, actress, and clothing designer. Born in Barbados, she entered the music industry in 2003 with help from Evan Rogers. She landed a contract with Def Jam Recordings after auditioning for rapper and producer Jay Z. Her debut album Music in the Sun and second album A Girl Like Me, exerted an everyday, humble, pretty and ‘exotic’ Caribbean girl aesthetic. Granting her a top 10 record on the U.S Billboard 200 list in 2006, she began to her take over of the music industry with her hit single "Pon de Replay". In 2007 she released her third studio album Good Girl Gone Bad, where she was given creative control to reinvent her image to become more sexualized. She and singer/producer/clothing designer Chris Brown had a short-lived relationship that ended in a domestic dispute, landing Brown probation. After this Rihanna took to her music once again reinventing her image to fit a raunchier aesthetic. "Russian Roulette" by Rihanna shows that sex-positive notions are challenged, this song speaks on gender, sex and violence which was her first single after her domestic violence dispute with Chris Brown. In her fifth studio album Loud released in 2010, she debuted one of her most controversial songs, "S&M". The lyrics are explicitly sexual, portraying soft-core sadomasochist acts and fetishes, and the video portrays Rihanna as a sexual object with very suggestive visuals and imagery. The video was banned in many countries, and was restricted to late night hours in others. She received this feedback because hypersexual culture is framed as problematic in our patriarchal society. Women are subjected to fall deaf to their bodily urges; the ‘publicness’ of the culture challenges the ways in which we view the women's rights to their bodies.

Some of "S&M"'s lyrics are:

Feels so good being bad

There's no way I'm turning back
Now the pain is my pleasure
Cause nothing could measure
Love is great, love is fine
Out the box, out of line
The affliction of the feeling

Leaves me wanting more

Here Rihanna expresses her fondness for out-of-the-box sex. She goes on to confesses that chains and whips excite her. She affirms her role in raunch culture; the hypersexualizing of a culture through music videos, advertising, the clothing industry and celebrity.

Esquire Magazine declared Rihanna "the sexiest woman alive" in 2011. The magazine cover is Rihanna completely nude with seaweed around her body as she is posed to show skin while her intimate body parts are covered from the position she is in. On the cover Rihanna is drawing a sexual desire from her fingers clawing her fresh, her gun tattoo pointing towards her side boob. The articles author of the article Ross McCammon stated how Rihanna's presence had left him speechless.

Rihanna has continued to top the charts with her catchy chorus and her raunchy aesthetic. In 2012 former boyfriend Chris Brown and Rihanna decided to collaborate on a few remixes that critics and fans rejected because of their history of domestic abuse. In their remix of the song "Birthday Cake", Rihanna can be perceived as singing to Brown with lyrics such as:

It's not even my birthday

But he want to lick the icing off
I know you want it in the worst way

Can't wait to blow my candles out

Here, once again she illustrates that sexual identity belongs to her, and that she is the only one who can decide what it looks like. With this provocative language, the singer angered a lot of people who did not believe that she should be singing, nor engaging in any sexual activity with Brown. However, it appears that she did not care much, and that she is not in the habit of letting people dictate her sexuality. Sexual behavior can be given a broader scope, where it includes all expressions of self as a being of sexual experiences. This view allows for all aspects of Rihanna's identity to be viewed as sexual performance. While her music has a raunchy aesthetic, so does the way she presents herself on an everyday basis, not limiting her performance to merely the way she dresses, but in the way she speaks with power and vitality, qualities she shares with the well-known raunchy performer Missy Elliott. By overtly expressing her sexual desires, the artist embraces the raunchy aesthetic reclaiming the power of sexual identity.

=== Nicki Minaj ===
Nicki Minaj is another music artist who has caught the public eye for nearly 15 years. She gained attention over her extremely sexual music video, "Anaconda". The song starts out saying, "My anaconda don't want none unless you got buns, Hun." The song references Sir-Mix-A-Lot's single, "Baby Got Back", which also refers to women's butts, giving the message that if you don't have a "fat" one, you are not wanted. Throughout Nicki's music video, she is dressed in what some would consider extremely provocative, with buttocks twerking all over the screen for the duration of the five-minute music video.

=== Lizzo ===
Lizzo, also known as Melissa Viviane Jefferson, is an American singer, born in Detroit, and raised in Houston. Lizzo has gained mass popularity in the last few years, with songs hitting the charts such as, "Truth Hurts" and "Good as Hell". In terms of Lizzo relating to Raunch aesthetics, she is a twerking icon, which is a dance that is center stage in the raunch aesthetics world. In a recent Ted Talk that Lizzo gave titled, "The Black History of Twerking - and How it Taught Me Self-love", Lizzo talks about where twerking came from. Twerking came from West Africa and was referred to as "mapouka", and was often done in order to celebrate something. Lizzo also discusses her insecurities growing up, the main one she focuses on was her butt. She says that she hated her butt until she started twerking. Lizzo states that she was inspired by women that came before her such as: Rihanna, Beyoncé, and Josephine Baker. Lizzo also touches on how she views twerking as "a pearl of optimism" and that she is grateful how her career was able to take off through the mainstreaming of twerking. Lizzo goes on to talk about the feelings that she experiences while twerking, she says that when she twerks she feels; empowered, free, sexually liberated, and sees it as a way of self expression. She also says that twerking helps her "reclaim her blackness" and that when she is twerking she's "doing it for the culture, not the vulture." Lizzo's song “Rumors" that came out in early 2021 is a perfect example of raunch aesthetics in today's world, with lyrics such as:

Spending all your time tryna break a woman down

Realer shit is going on, baby, take a look around

If you thought that I was ratchet with my ass hanging out

Just wait until the summer when they let me out the house, bitch

These lyrics embody not only the concept of raunch aesthetics with lyrics like "If you thought I was ratchet with my ass hanging out" and "Just wait until the summer when they let me out the house, bitch" which alludes to being even more open with her body once summer comes; she also addresses another important part of raunch aesthetics, the hate that these women get, with lyrics like "Spending all your time tryna break a woman down". Along with the lyrics, the music video for this song is another form of raunch aesthetic. Within the video, one finds vases with pictures/graphics of women twerking, dancing on poles, and demonstrating other sexual positions.

=== Megan Thee Stallion ===
Megan Thee Stallion is a Houston native rap artist who has made a name for herself through her provocative lyrics and sexual expression/display of her body. Her rise to fame began from posting highly engaged rap freestyles and led her to now holding multiple Grammy Awards. Megan has consistently expressed her sexuality in her music by using provocative lyrics from popular songs like Big Ole Freak, Freak Nasty and more. Her popular collaborative song WAP with Cardi B generated much backlash from Republicans who felt that their Grammy performance was extremely inappropriate and vulgar for television. Megan has also expressed her sexuality and exhibited raunch culture by posting twerking videos along her social media pages which has also been met with disdain from commentators who felt she performed the dance excessively.

=== Chlöe Bailey ===
Chlöe Bailey is a protégé of Beyoncé who was initially introduced to the world through the duo group Chlöe x Halle with her sister Halle Bailey. In an effort to step out and break away from the teen image she maintained while building her career, she released a song called “Have Mercy”. In the song Chlöe describes her figure and takes control of her sexuality:

All this ass up in my jeans

You can't get up in between

You tryna get a piece of me

I can teach you a couple things

In the music video you can see her and other women twerking and moving their bodies in a sexual manner. Chlöe has also displayed raunch aesthetics through posts on social media that promote body positivity and self-acceptance. Due to this, Chlöe has received an intense amount of internet backlash, with some feeling she is "doing too much" or "seeking attention." In response, Chlöe has responded to the backlash through social media, conveying the overall message that she is secure enough to live her life the way she chooses.
