= Sexyy Red =

American rapper (born 1998)

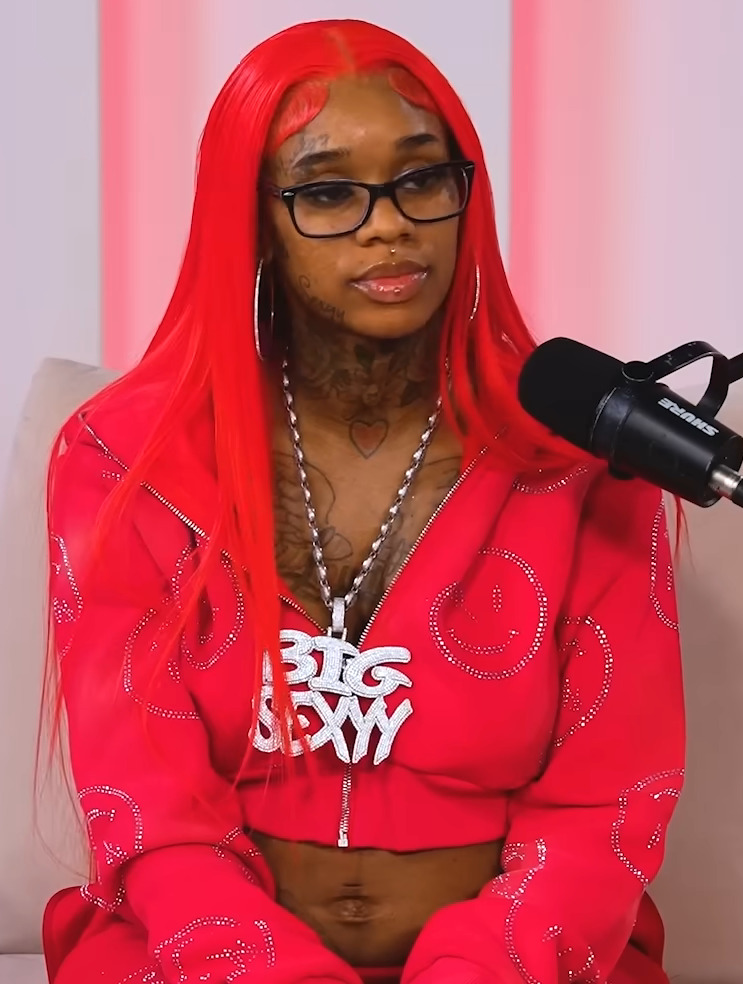
- Sexyy Red in 2023

Background information
- Born: Janae Nierah Wherry; April 15, 1998 (age 28); St. Louis, Missouri, U.S.
- Genre: Dirty rap
- Occupation: Rapper
- Years active: 2018–present
- Labels: Gamma; Open Shift; Rebel
- Children: 2
- Website: sexyylove.com

Janae Nierah Wherry (born April 15, 1998), known professionally as Sexyy Red, is an American rapper. She rose to prominence with the release of her 2023 single "Pound Town" (with Tay Keith); its popularity spawned the remixed sequel "Pound Town 2" (with Nicki Minaj), her first entry on the Billboard Hot 100. Her follow-up single, "SkeeYee", was met with similar success; both songs were included on her second mixtape, Hood Hottest Princess (2023). Billboard declared Wherry as "one of the biggest breakout artists of summer 2023."

That same year, Wherry guest appeared on the remixes of the singles "Shake Sumn" by DaBaby, "Slut Me Out" by NLE Choppa, and "Peaches & Eggplants" by Young Nudy, alongside rapper Latto. She guest appeared on Drake's 2023 single "Rich Baby Daddy", which peaked within the Billboard Hot 100's top 20. Her 2024 single and second top 40 entry, "Get It Sexyy", preceded her third mixtape, In Sexyy We Trust (2024). That same year, her appearance on Tyler, the Creator's single "Sticky", alongside GloRilla and Lil Wayne, peaked within its top ten, and was nominated for Best Rap Song at the 68th Annual Grammy Awards. Her 2025 single "Whatchu Kno About Me" (with GloRilla) received double platinum certification by the Recording Industry Association of America (RIAA).

In addition to a Grammy Award nomination, Wherry won "Best Breakthrough Hip Hop Artist" at the 2024 BET Hip Hop Awards.

== Early life ==
Janae Nierah Wherry was born in St. Louis, Missouri, on April 15, 1998, and raised there. Wherry started rapping after penning a diss track directed towards a boyfriend who cheated on her. Her stage name, "Sexyy Red", was adapted from the nickname "Red", which she had had for a long time due to her dyed red hair. She has previously worked as a hairdresser and a call-center agent. In 2016, she graduated from Normandy High School in Wellston, Missouri.

== Career ==
Red released her first song "Ah Thousand Jugs" in 2018. In 2021, she released her debut mixtape, Ghetto Superstar.

In January 2023, she released "Pound Town" with Tay Keith, which later went viral on social media. In April, she was featured on the remix of NLE Choppa's "Slut Me Out". In May that same year, she released "Pound Town 2" with Nicki Minaj, which became her first entry on the Billboard Hot 100. In June, she released the mixtape Hood Hottest Princess. In August 2023, Red joined Drake on his It's All a Blur Tour as an opening act, having appeared as a guest at previous shows. She featured alongside SZA on his single "Rich Baby Daddy", from his eighth studio album For All the Dogs, in October. Her first top-10 song in the United States was with Tyler, the Creator over a year later. The two released a collaboration with GloRilla and Lil Wayne, "Sticky" from the album Chromakopia, in October 2024.

On May 28, 2024, Red appeared at WWE NXT where she presented the new NXT Women's North American Championship. On June 9, 2024, she hosted the 2024 NXT Battleground PLE.

In February 11, 2026, Red posted a video on her Instagram showing a remix of Michael Jackson's "Beat It". Shortly after, Jackson's estate responded, deeming the usage of the song as unauthorized.

== Artistry ==
=== Influences ===
Growing up, Red listened to artists such as Gucci Mane, Lil Wayne, Nicki Minaj, Project Pat, Juicy J, Three 6 Mafia, Chief Keef, Webbie, Boosie Badazz, and Trina. Kyle Denis remarked in Billboard that those artists "embody the unapologetically hood energy that now courses through every Sexyy Red song", with Red herself stating that she sought to emulate their "fearlessness". She has frequently been called the "Female Gucci Mane" in particular and released a song with that title on her mixtape Hood Hottest Princess.

=== Lyrical and musical style ===
"I don't agree with that ["pussy rap" classification], because why is that the only thing you heard me talking about? That's the only thing that you got out of everything I just said? You just heard me say 'coochie'? I hate when they say that. I just rap about my daily life. Girls that live like me, I just rap about what we go through. I don't sit and talk about coochie all day."

— Sexyy Red discussing her lyrical themes

Red's lyrics focus on one-sentence phrases rather than metaphors and other devices, with Jayson Buford of Rolling Stone writing that "she abstains from traditional lyricism". He also described her as a "classic Southern rapper". In Complex, Eric Skelton called her songs "full of viral lyrics". Red has stated that her daily life serves as the main inspiration for her music. Due to the often highly sexual nature of her lyrics, she has been characterized as a prominent figure of "pussy rap", although she rejects this classification and has expressed exasperation over being reduced to her sexual songs. Red is also noted for her distinctive voice and flow. She has received praise for her "authenticity" and her "energy", which are cited as factors for her success with a broad audience.

== Public image ==
Sexyy Red has been a focal point in discussions about the representation of Black women in the music industry. During an interview with One Musicfest, American rapper Trina defended Red, emphasizing her right to express herself freely and to create music on her own terms. In contrast, rapper Khia voiced her disapproval of being compared to artists like Trina and Red, citing concerns over their perceived negative influence. In response, Red addressed Khia's remarks on social media, referring to her as "washed up" and "miserable".

== Personal life ==
Red's first child, a son, was born in 2020. On October 15, 2023, she announced that she was pregnant with her second child in an Instagram post. She gave birth to her second child on February 5, 2024, a daughter, and footage of her in the delivery room was the center of Drake's music video for "Rich Baby Daddy", released 9 days later.

In August 2023, Red disclosed on a podcast that she was a victim of rape.

Red had expressed support for then-former U.S. president Donald Trump and used the phrase "Make America Sexyy Again" in her branding. However, she revealed in November 2024 that she voted for Vice President Kamala Harris in the 2024 presidential election.

== Discography ==
=== Mixtapes ===
List of mixtapes, with selected details, chart positions and certifications
Title	Mixtape details	Peak chart positions				Certifications
Title	Mixtape details	US	US R&B /HH	US Rap	CAN	Certifications
Ghetto Superstar	Released: December 24, 2021; Label: Self-released; Format: CD, digital download, streaming	—	—	—	—	
Hood Hottest Princess	Released: June 9, 2023; Label: Open Shift, Gamma; Format: CD, digital download, streaming	62	21	13	—	RIAA: Gold
In Sexyy We Trust	Released: May 24, 2024; Label: Open Shift, Gamma; Format: CD, digital download, streaming	17	5	5	80	
Yo Favorite Trappa Favorite Rappa	Released: April 15, 2026; Label: Rebel, Gamma; Format: CD, Digital download, streaming	—	—	—	—	
"—" denotes a recording that did not chart or was not released in that territory.

=== Extended plays ===
List of extended plays, with selected details
Title	EP details
Pound Town	Released: April 30, 2023; Label: Open Shift; Format: CD, digital download, streaming

=== Singles ===
==== As lead artist ====
List of singles as lead artist, with selected chart positions and certifications, showing year released and album name
Title	Year	Peak chart positions										Certifications	Album
Title	Year	US	US R&B /HH	US Rap	US Rhy.	AUS	CAN	IRE	NZ	UK	WW	Certifications	Album
"Ah Thousand Jugs"	2018	—	—	—	—	—	—	—	—	—	—		Non-album singles
"Free Smoke"	2018	—	—	—	—	—	—	—	—	—	—		Non-album singles
"Don't Trust Em"	2019	—	—	—	—	—	—	—	—	—	—		Non-album singles
"Northside"	2019	—	—	—	—	—	—	—	—	—	—		Non-album singles
"Young Hot Nigga"	2019	—	—	—	—	—	—	—	—	—	—		Non-album singles
"Slob on My Ckat"	2021	—	—	—	—	—	—	—	—	—	—		Non-album singles
"Ghetto Freestyle"	2021	—	—	—	—	—	—	—	—	—	—		Ghetto Superstar
"Throw That MF"	2021	—	—	—	—	—	—	—	—	—	—		Non-album single
"Hood Bitch"	2021	—	—	—	—	—	—	—	—	—	—		Ghetto Superstar
"My Bitches"	2021	—	—	—	—	—	—	—	—	—	—		Ghetto Superstar
"I Love My Nickel"	2022	—	—	—	—	—	—	—	—	—	—		Non-album singles
"Throwin' It"	2022	—	—	—	—	—	—	—	—	—	—		Non-album singles
"Don't Get Beat"	2022	—	—	—	—	—	—	—	—	—	—		Non-album singles
"My Twin"	2022	—	—	—	—	—	—	—	—	—	—		Non-album singles
"Born by the River" (featuring Sukihana)	2022	—	—	—	—	—	—	—	—	—	—		Hood Hottest Princess
"All White Air Forces"	2022	—	—	—	—	—	—	—	—	—	—		Non-album singles
"FYM"	2022	—	—	—	—	—	—	—	—	—	—		Non-album singles
"Tired"	2022	—	—	—	—	—	—	—	—	—	—		Non-album singles
"Pound Town" (with Tay Keith or remix with Nicki Minaj)	2023	66	21	14	19	—	—	—	—	—	—	RIAA: Platinum	Hood Hottest Princess
"Push Start"	2023	—	—	—	—	—	—	—	—	—	—		Non-album single
"Female Gucci Mane"	2023	—	—	—	—	—	—	—	—	—	—		Hood Hottest Princess
"SkeeYee"	2023	62	17	12	13	—	—	—	—	—	—	RIAA: Platinum	Hood Hottest Princess
"Hood Rats" (with Sukihana)	2023	—	—	—	—	—	—	—	—	—	—		Hood Hottest Princess
"Hellcats SRTs" (solo or remix featuring Lil Durk)	2023	— (Note: "Hellcats SRTs 2" did not enter the Billboard Hot 100, but peaked at number one on the Bubbling Under Hot 100 chart.)	40	—	—	—	—	—	—	—	—		Hood Hottest Princess
"Shake Yo Dreads"	2023	—	—	—	—	—	—	—	—	—	—		Hood Hottest Princess
"Free My N***a"	2023	—	—	—	—	—	—	—	—	—	—		Hood Hottest Princess
"Bow Bow Bow (F My Baby Mama)" (with Chief Keef)	2023	— (Note: "Bow Bow Bow (F My Baby Dad)" did not enter the Billboard Hot 100, but peaked at number 14 on the Bubbling Under Hot 100 chart.)	38	—	—	—	—	—	—	—	—	RIAA: Gold	Non-album single
"Get It Sexyy"	2024	20	6	5	8	—	82	—	—	—	73	RIAA: 2× Platinum; RMNZ: Gold	In Sexyy We Trust
"U My Everything" (with Drake)	2024	44	12	10	12	—	70	—	— (Note: "U My Everything" did not enter the NZ Top 40 Singles Chart, but peaked at number 6 on the NZ Hot 40 Singles Chart.)	—	132	RIAA: Gold	In Sexyy We Trust
"U Kno What to Do (UKWTD)"	2024	—	42	—	—	—	—	—	—	—	—		Non-album single
"Whatchu Kno About Me" (with GloRilla)	2024	17	3	2	1	—	59	—	30	93	62	RIAA: 2× Platinum; RMNZ: Platinum	Glorious
"Fat Juicy & Wet" (with Bruno Mars)	2025	17	4	4	5	55	27	76	31	32	22	MC: Platinum	Non-album singles
"Guilt Trippin" (with Central Cee)	2025	—	—	—	—	86	—	—	— (Note: "Guilt Trippin" did not enter the NZ Top 40 Singles Chart, but peaked at number 10 on the NZ Hot Singles Chart.)	47	—		Non-album singles
"If You Want It"	2025	—	50	—	—	—	—	—	—	—	—		Yo Favorite Trappa Favorite Rappa
"Hang wit a Bad Bitch" (featuring Key Glock)	2026	— (Note: "Hang wit a Bad Bitch" did not enter the Billboard Hot 100, but peaked at number 6 on the Bubbling Under Hot 100 chart.)	28	21	22	—	—	—	—	—	—		Yo Favorite Trappa Favorite Rappa
"—" denotes a recording that did not chart or was not released in that territory.

==== As featured artist ====
List of singles as featured artist, with selected chart positions and certifications, showing year released and album name
Title	Year	Peak chart positions										Certifications	Album
Title	Year	US	US R&B /HH	US Rap	AUS	CAN	GER	IRE	NZ	UK	WW	Certifications	Album
"Sense dat God Gave You" (Summer Walker featuring Sexyy Red)	2022	—	—	—	—	—	—	—	—	—	—		Non-album single
"Slut Me Out (Remix)" (NLE Choppa featuring Sexyy Red)	2023	—	—	—	—	—	—	—	—	—	—		Cottonwood 2
"Check" (Gloss Up featuring Sexyy Red)	2023	—	—	—	—	—	—	—	—	—	—		Non-album singles
"Area Codes (314 Remix)" (Kaliii featuring Sexyy Red)	2023	—	—	—	—	—	—	—	—	—	—		Non-album singles
"Shiesty" (Finesse2tymes featuring Kaliii and Sexyy Red)	2023	—	—	—	—	—	—	—	—	—	—		Non-album singles
"Shake Sumn (Remix)" (DaBaby featuring Sexyy Red)	2023	—	—	—	—	—	—	—	—	—	—		Non-album singles
"Mmm Hmm" (Lancey Foux featuring Sexyy Red)	2023	—	—	—	—	—	—	—	—	—	—		Back2datrap
"Face Down" (MCVertt featuring ASAP Ferg and Sexyy Red)	2023	—	—	—	—	—	—	—	—	—	—		Non-album singles
"One Margarita (Margarita Song) (Ladies Remix)" (That Chick Angel featuring Sexyy Red, FendiDa Rappa, and Flo Milli)	2023	—	—	—	—	—	—	—	—	—	—		Non-album singles
"Perc & Sex" (YN Jay featuring G Herbo and Sexyy Red)	2023	—	—	—	—	—	—	—	—	—	—		Non-album singles
"I Love Freaks (Sexyy's Version)" (Lijay featuring Sexyy Red)	2023	—	—	—	—	—	—	—	—	—	—		Non-album singles
"Bing Bong (Remix)" (Blakeiana featuring Sexyy Red)	2023	—	—	—	—	—	—	—	—	—	—		Non-album singles
"Peaches & Eggplants (Remix)" (Young Nudy featuring Sexyy Red and Latto)	2023	—	—	—	—	—	—	—	—	—	—		Non-album singles
"Big Dawg" (Moneybagg Yo with Sexyy Red and CMG the Label)	2023	—	—	—	—	—	—	—	—	—	—		Gangsta Art 2
"No Panties" (Raedio featuring Sexyy Red)	2023	—	—	—	—	—	—	—	—	—	—		Rap Sh!t: The Mixtape (From the Max Original Series, S2)
"Rich Baby Daddy" (Drake featuring Sexyy Red and SZA)	2023	11	4	3	11	18	68	20	9	10	16	RIAA: 3× Platinum; ARIA: Platinum; BPI: Platinum; MC: 2× Platinum; RMNZ: 2× Platinum	For All the Dogs
"All She Do Is Shake" (J Traxx featuring Sexyy Red)	2023	—	—	—	—	—	—	—	—	—	—		Non-album singles
"Hoe Shit" (GenesisTheGawd featuring Sexyy Red)	2023	—	—	—	—	—	—	—	—	—	—		Non-album singles
"Bent (Remix)" (41, Kyle Richh, Jenn Carter, and TaTa featuring Sexyy Red)	2023	—	—	—	—	—	—	—	—	—	—		41 World: Not the Album
"Yonce Freestyle" (Kevin Gates featuring Sexyy Red and B.G.)	2023	—	—	—	—	—	—	—	—	—	—		The Ceremony
"Daddy" (Tokischa featuring Sexyy Red)	2023	—	—	—	—	—	—	—	—	—	—		Non-album single
"Sexyy & Conceited" (Pardison Fontaine featuring Sexyy Red)	2023	—	—	—	—	—	—	—	—	—	—		Sext8pe
"Somethin'" (Nardo Wick featuring Sexyy Red)	2024	—	—	—	—	—	—	—	—	—	—		Non-album single
"Damn Shorty" (Chief Keef and Mike Will Made It featuring Sexyy Red)	2024	—	—	—	—	—	—	—	—	—	—		Dirty Nachos
"FTCU (SleezeMix)" (Nicki Minaj featuring Travis Scott, Chris Brown, and Sexyy Red)	2024	—	—	—	—	—	—	—	— (Note: "FTCU" (SleezeMix) did not enter the NZ Top 40 Singles Chart, but peaked at number 20 on the NZ Hot Singles Chart.)	—	—		Non-album single
"Sticky" (Tyler, the Creator featuring GloRilla, Sexyy Red, and Lil Wayne)	2024	10	1	1	33	26	—	63	25	57	23	RIAA: 3× Platinum; BPI: Silver; MC: Platinum; RMNZ: Platinum	Chromakopia
"—" denotes a recording that did not chart or was not released in that territory.

=== Other charted and certified songs ===
List of other charted songs, with selected chart positions and certifications, showing year released and album name
Title	Year	Peak chart positions						Certifications	Album
Title	Year	US	US R&B /HH	US Rap	AUS	CAN	WW	Certifications	Album
"Looking for the Hoes (Ain't My Fault)"	2023	—	49	—	—	—	—	RIAA: Platinum	Hood Hottest Princess
"Sweet Spot" (with Justin Bieber)	2025	57	17	—	86	54	76		Swag
"Baller" (with Summer Walker, GloRilla, and Monaleo)	2025	96	23	13	—	—	—		Finally Over It
"Hurrr Not Thurrr" (with Drake)	2026	61	34	—	—	60	115		Habibti
"Cheetah Print" (with Drake)	2026	41	—	22	—	31	70		Maid of Honour
"Booty Club" (Pooh Shiesty featuring Sexyy Red and Tay Keith)	2026	—	36	—	—	—	—		All Eyes on Shiest
"—" denotes a recording that did not chart or was not released in that territory.

=== Film soundtrack ===
Year	Film	Song	Notes
2025	F1	"OMG!"	Co-performed with Tiesto

== Filmography ==
=== Film ===
Year	Film	Role	Notes	Ref.
2026	Livestream from Hell	Herself		
2026	Rolling Loud	Herself		

=== Video games ===
Year	Title	Voice role	Notes
2026	Grand Theft Auto VI	Herself	

== Tours ==
Headlining

- Hood Hottest Princess Tour (2023)
- Sexyy Red 4 President Tour (2024)

Supporting

- Moneybagg Yo – Larger than Life Tour (2023)
- Drake and 21 Savage – It's All a Blur Tour (2023)

== Awards and nominations ==
Award	Year	Nominee	Category	Result	Note
BET Hip Hop Awards	2023	Herself	Best Breakthrough Hip Hop Artist	Nominated	
BET Hip Hop Awards	2024	Herself	Best Breakthrough Hip Hop Artist	Won	
BET Awards	2024	Herself	Best New Artist	Nominated	
BET Awards	2024	Herself	Best Female Hip-Hop Artist	Nominated	
BET Awards	2024	"Rich Baby Daddy" (with Drake and SZA)	Best Collaboration	Nominated	
BET Awards	2024	"Rich Baby Daddy" (with Drake and SZA)	Viewer's Choice Award	Nominated	
BET Awards	2024	"Rich Baby Daddy" (with Drake and SZA)	Video of the Year	Nominated	
MTV Video Music Awards	2024	"Rich Baby Daddy" (with Drake and SZA)	Best Collaboration	Nominated	
MTV Video Music Awards	2024	"Rich Baby Daddy" (with Drake and SZA)	Best Hip Hop	Nominated	
Grammy Awards	2026	"Sticky" (with Tyler, The Creator, GloRilla and Lil Wayne)	Best Rap Song	Nominated	

== See also ==
- Raunch aesthetics
