= Gamma (media company) =

American media company

Gamma Media Holdings, LLC
- Founded: 2023
- Founder: Larry Jackson; Ike Youssef
- Headquarters: Los Angeles, California, United States
- Website: thegamma.com

Gamma Media Holdings, LLC (stylized as gamma.) is an American media company founded in 2023 by former Apple executive Larry Jackson and record executive Ike Youssef. Described as a competitor to major labels, the company uses the technology platform Vydia to distribute music directly to streaming services.

== History ==
Gamma was founded by music executive Larry Jackson with US$1 billion in start-up capital from investors including Todd Boehly's Eldridge Industries.

The company focuses primarily on Black culture, using social media and digital platforms to reach younger demographics. It operates a distribution platform and partners with film and television production companies, including A24, to assist artists in expanding into other media sectors.

Gamma's initial roster of artists included Usher, Rick Ross, Snoop Dogg, Sexyy Red, and French Montana. The company partnered with Kanye West and his YZY label to distribute his album Bully. Additionally, Gamma distributes back-catalog releases for Snoop Dogg and Tha Dogg Pound.

== Artists ==
=== Current ===
Act	Year signed	Releases under the label
Snoop Dogg	2023	2
Rick Ross	2023	1
Usher	2023	1
Sexyy Red	2023	3
French Montana	2023	1
D Smoke	2023	0
4Batz	2024	1
Jaden	2024	0
Willow	2024	1
Usimamane	2024	1
Rich the Kid	2024	1
Blaq Diamond	2024	0
Tha Dogg Pound	2024	1
DearALICE	2024	1
Moliy	2024	0
Mariah Carey	2025	1
Asake	2025	0
Loe Shimmy	2025	1
Hurricane Wisdom	2025	2
Kanye West	2026	1
North West	2026	1
Detahjae	2026	0
Olivia O'Brien	2026	0

=== Former ===
- F5ve (2024–2025), 4 releases

== Distributed labels ==
- Enforce Records (2023–present)
- Konvict Kulture (2020–present)
- Maybach Music Group (2023–present)
- Death Row Records (2023–present)
- Popular Demand Entertainment (2023–present)
- Mega (2023–present)
- Open Shift Distribution (2023–present)
- Three Six Zero Recordings (2024–2025)
- Whutitdo Music (2024–present)
- Bonfire (2021–present)
- YZY (2026–present)

== Discography ==
=== Studio albums ===
Artist	Album	Details
Rick Ross and Meek Mill	Too Good to Be True (released with Maybach)	Released: November 10, 2023; Chart position: #23 U.S.; RIAA certification: —
Usher	Coming Home (released with Mega)	Released: February 9, 2024; Chart position: #2 U.S.; RIAA certification: —
Willow	Empathogen (released with Three Six Zero)	Released: May 3, 2024; Chart position: —; RIAA certification: —
Tha Dogg Pound	W.A.W.G. (We All We Got) (released with Death Row)	Released: May 31, 2024; Chart position: —; RIAA certification: —
Rich the Kid	Life's a Gamble (released with RTK)	Released: July 19, 2024; Chart position: —; RIAA certification: —
Usimamane	20th: Days Before Maud	Released: September 13, 2024; Chart position: —; RIAA certification: —
Snoop Dogg	Iz It a Crime? (released with Death Row)	Released: May 15, 2025; Chart position: —; RIAA certification: —
Mariah Carey	Here for It All	Released: September 26, 2025; Chart position: #7 U.S.; RIAA certification: —
Kanye West	Bully (released with YZY)	Released: March 28, 2026; Chart position: #2 U.S.; RIAA certification: —
Snoop Dogg	10 Til' Midnight (released with Death Row)	Released: May 15, 2025; Chart position: —; RIAA certification: —
Sexyy Red	Yo Favorite Trappa Favorite Rappa (released with Rebel)	Released: April 15, 2026; Chart position: —; RIAA certification: —
Rick Ross	Set in Stone (released with Maybach)	Released: July 17, 2026; Chart position: #39 U.S.; RIAA certification: —

=== EPs ===
Artist	EP	Details
DearALICE	BitterSweetSummer	Released: June 27, 2025; Chart position: —; RIAA certification: —
North West	N0rth4evr	Released: May 1, 2026; Chart position: —; RIAA certification: —
DearALICE	DanceFloorKilla	Released: September 25, 2026; Chart position: —; RIAA certification: —

=== Mixtapes ===
Artist	Mixtape	Details
Sexyy Red	Hood Hottest Princess (released with Open Shift)	Released: June 9, 2023; Chart position: #62 U.S.; RIAA certification: Gold
French Montana	Mac & Cheese 5 (released with Coke Boys)	Released: February 23, 2024; Chart position: #14 U.S.; RIAA certification: —
4Batz	U Made Me a St4r	Released: May 3, 2024; Chart position: #30 U.S.; RIAA certification: —
Sexyy Red	In Sexyy We Trust (released with Open Shift)	Released: May 24, 2024; Chart position: #17 U.S.; RIAA certification: —
