= Ranchy =

- Commune
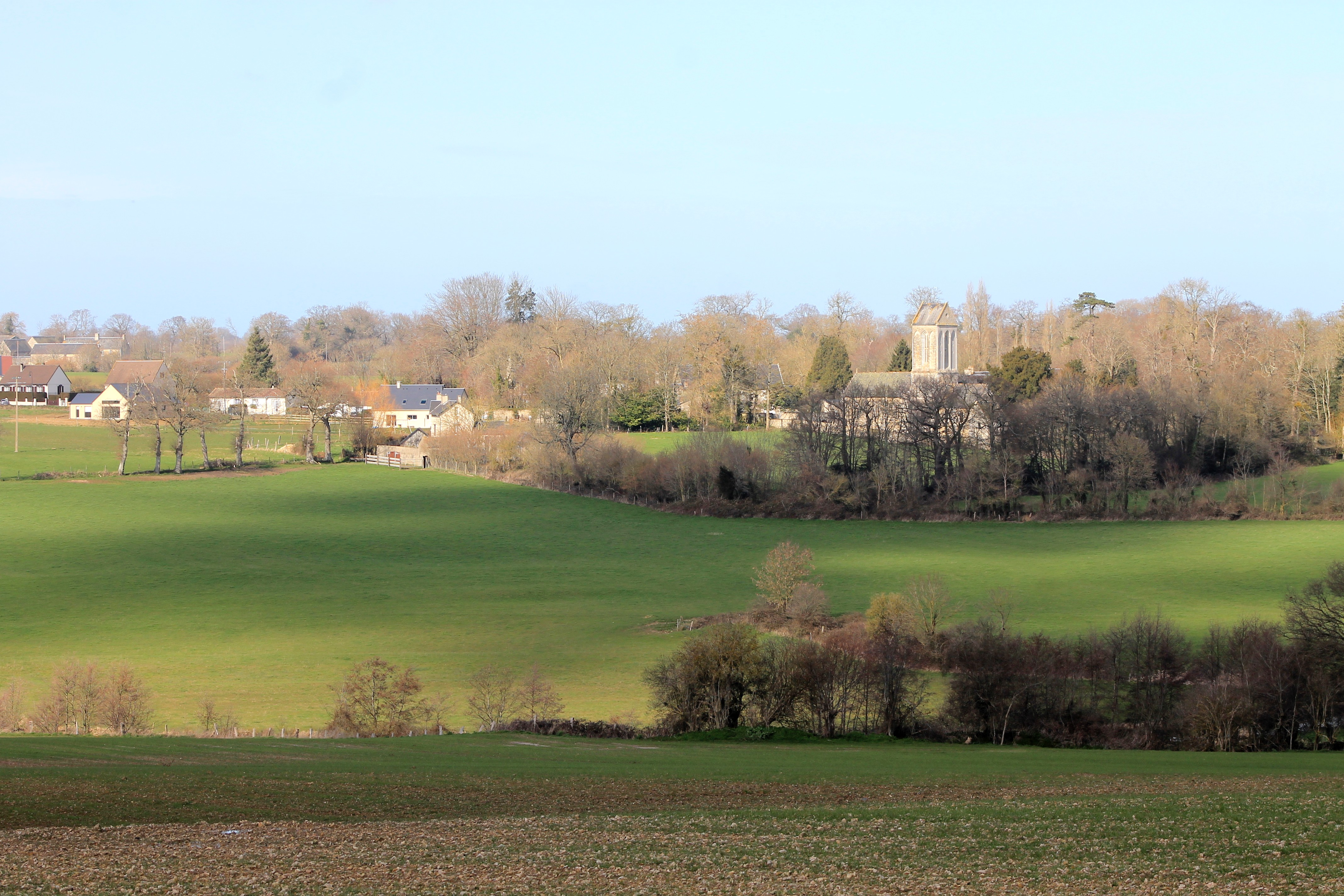
- A general view of Ranchy
- Location of Ranchy
- Location within France Location within Normandy
- Coordinates: 49°15′17″N 0°45′19″W
- Country: France
- Region: Normandy
- Department: Calvados
- Arrondissement: Bayeux
- Canton: Bayeux
- Intercommunality: CC Bayeux Intercom

Government
  - Mayor (2020–2026): Gilbert Michel
- Area^{1}: 5.14 km^{2} (1.98 sq mi)
- Elevation: 47 m (154 ft)
- Highest elevation: 82 m (269 ft)
- Lowest elevation: 27 m (89 ft)
- Population (2023): 270
  - Density: 53/km^{2} (140/sq mi)
- Time zone: UTC+01:00 (CET)
  - Summer (DST): UTC+02:00 (CEST)
- INSEE/Postal code: 14529 /14400
- ^{1} French Land Register data, which excludes lakes, ponds, glaciers > 1 km^{2} (0.386 sq mi or 247 acres) and river estuaries.

Ranchy (French pronunciation: [ʁɑ̃ʃi]) is a commune in Calvados, a department in the Normandy region in northwestern France.

== Population ==
Historical population
Year	Pop.	±% p.a.
1968	154	—
1975	132	−2.18%
1982	135	+0.32%
1990	167	+2.69%
1999	157	−0.68%
2007	189	+2.35%
2012	220	+3.08%
2017	248	+2.42%
2023	270	+1.43%
Source: INSEE

== See also ==
- Communes of the Calvados department
