= Pound Town =

2023 single by Sexyy Red and Tay Keith

Single by Sexyy Red and Tay Keith

from the album Hood Hottest Princess
- Released: January 27, 2023
- Genre: Dirty rap
- Length: 2:09
- Label: Open Shift
- Songwriters: Janae Wherry; Brytavious Chambers
- Producer: Tay Keith

Sexyy Red singles chronology
"Born by the River" (2022)	"Pound Town" (2023)	"Slut Me Out (Remix)" (2023)

Tay Keith singles chronology
"Lights Off" (2022)	"Pound Town" (2023)

Music video
- "Pound Town" on YouTube
- "Pound Town (Spring Break Edition)" on YouTube

Remix cover
- Cover art of the official remix featuring Nicki Minaj.

Nicki Minaj singles chronology
"Alone" (2023)	"Pound Town 2" (2023)	"Barbie World" (2023)

Audio video
- "Pound Town 2" on YouTube

"Pound Town" is a single by American rapper Sexyy Red and American record producer Tay Keith, released on January 27, 2023. It became Sexyy Red's breakout song through going viral on the video-sharing app TikTok. An official remix of the song featuring rapper Nicki Minaj was released on May 26, 2023.

== Background ==
In an interview with Complex, Sexyy Red spoke about the process of writing the song:

I was in the studio, just on some lazy stuff, and my people was like, "Come on, you got more songs to record." And I'm like, "I ain't got nothing wrote down, come on now." So I went in the booth, and this was my first time ever freestyling. I heard the beat and just started rapping from there. The whole thing was a freestyle.

According to Red, she was describing what was happening in her life that day when recording the song, in which she mentions looking for "hoochie daddies" and "dreadheads". She also stated in the interview, "I honestly didn't even know it was going to turn up like that. When I was recording it as a freestyle, I'm like, 'It's tight,' but I didn't say, 'Oh, this is going to be a hit, this is going to go viral.' I just was like, it's a cool little fun song to sing with your friends."

== Release and promotion ==
The song was first released on January 27, 2023, through Open Shift Distribution. When first promoting the song, Sexyy Red focused on the line "Too many bitches, where the niggas at?" because she had created a dance to accompany it. The song eventually attracted attention on TikTok, particularly due to the lyrics "My coochie pink, my booty-hole brown", which formed the basis for a number of Internet memes in early 2023. Sexyy Red has said, "I be seeing the memes, I be seeing the captions, and I be laughing every time. I ain't think that was going to be the part of the song that they liked, though." As a result of the song's popularity, Sexyy Red has received attention from celebrities such as Cardi B, Post Malone and Kai Cenat. The song also sparked the #PoundTownChallenge on TikTok.

Fellow rapper GloRilla posted a video of her rapping to "Pound Town". Summer Walker also covered the song.

== Remix ==
An official remix of the song titled "Pound Town 2" was released on May 26, 2023, and has a guest appearance from Nicki Minaj, who wrote in a message to fans: "I met with Sexyy Red & found her to be so down to earth & sweet. I couldn't hear myself on this song at first but once I let go & decided to just have fun with a bad b!ch, I ended up LOVING how it came out!"

Noah Grant of HotNewHipHop stated, "The song was already pretty dirty, but the Queen of Rap found clever ways to make it even dirtier with her verse." Shawn Grant of The Source commented that Minaj's verse "gives the music an unforeseen twist and increases the song's energy." Jordan Darville of The Fader wrote, "The New York rapper's verse, full of sharp bars about her prerogative for pleasure on her terms, is a nice contrast to Sexyy Red's more conversational style, which feels more like a slightly oversharing friend is confiding in you." Thanks to the remix, this earned Sexyy Red and Tay Keith (producer of the song) their first Billboard Hot 100 entries.

== Charts ==
=== Weekly charts ===
Weekly chart performance for "Pound Town 2"
Chart (2023)	Peak position
US Billboard Hot 100	66
US Hot R&B/Hip-Hop Songs (Billboard)	21
US R&B/Hip-Hop Airplay (Billboard)	17
US Rhythmic Airplay (Billboard)	19

=== Year-end charts ===
Year-end chart performance for "Pound Town 2"
Chart (2023)	Position
US Hot R&B/Hip-Hop Songs (Billboard)	64

== Certifications ==
Certifications for "Pound Town"
Region	Certification	Certified units/sales
United States (RIAA)	Platinum	1,000,000^{‡}
^{‡} Sales+streaming figures based on certification alone.
