= DaBaby discography =

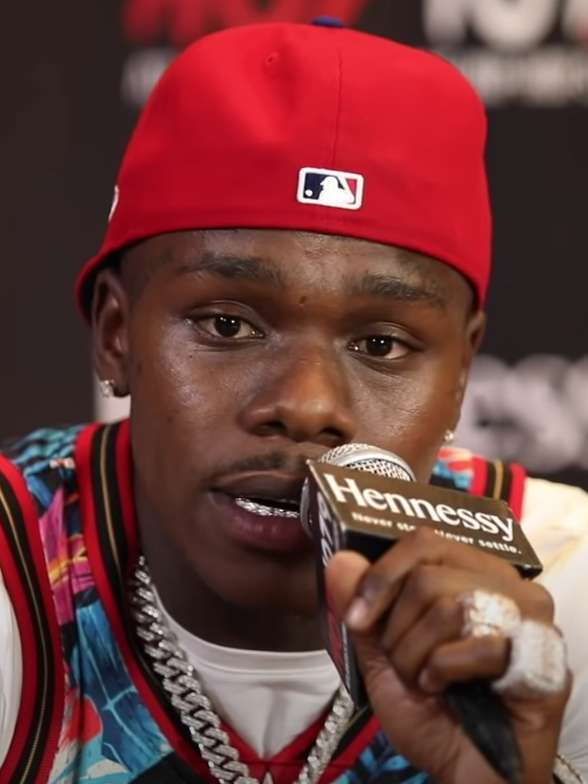
- DaBaby in 2019
- Studio albums: 5
- EPs: 4
- Singles: 138
- Mixtapes: 14

The discography of American rapper DaBaby consists of five studio albums, four extended plays, thirteen mixtapes, and 138 singles (including 92 as a featured artist).

DaBaby, who was known as Baby Jesus at the time, released his debut mixtape NonFiction in 2015, he then released three more mixtapes from 2015 to 2016. He followed them up with his Baby Talk mixtape series. His thirteenth mixtape, Blank Blank was released in 2018.

DaBaby released his debut studio album, Baby on Baby in March 2019. It included his breakthrough hit single, "Suge", which reached number 7 on the US Billboard Hot 100, becoming his first entry on the chart. His second studio album, Kirk was released months later in September 2019, and became his first album to top the US Billboard 200 chart. In April 2020, he released his third album Blame It on Baby, which includes the chart-topping single "Rockstar", featuring Roddy Ricch. In November 2020, he released his first EP, titled My Brother's Keeper (Long Live G).

In 2021, DaBaby dropped multiple non-album singles and released his second EP, Back on My Baby Jesus Sh!t Again, which acted as a sequel to his 2017 mixtape Back On My Baby Jesus Shit.

In 2022, DaBaby collaborated with fellow rapper YoungBoy Never Broke Again on a mixtape, titled Better than You, which charted in the top 10 of the Billboard 200.

== Albums ==
=== Studio albums ===
List of studio albums, with selected chart positions and sales figures
Title	Album details	Peak chart positions										Sales	Certifications
Title	Album details	US	AUS	CAN	DEN	FRA	IRE	NZ	NOR	SWE	UK	Sales	Certifications
Baby on Baby	Released: March 1, 2019; Label: SCMG, Interscope; Formats: Digital download, streaming	7	—	27	—	—	—	—	—	—	—		RIAA: Platinum
Kirk	Released: September 27, 2019; Label: SCMG, Interscope; Formats: Digital download, streaming	1	11	2	19	—	17	—	10	27	24		RIAA: 2× Platinum
Blame It on Baby	Released: April 17, 2020; Label: SCMG, Interscope; Formats: CD, LP, digital download, streaming	1	7	1	3	29	5	3	2	6	8	US: 57,700 (Note: In 2020 the album sold 57,700 pure copies.)	RIAA: 2× Platinum; MC: Platinum
Baby on Baby 2	Released: September 23, 2022; Label: SCMG, Interscope; Formats: Digital download, streaming	34	—	—	—	—	—	—	—	—	—		
Be More Grateful	Released: January 30, 2026; Label: SCMG, Interscope; Formats: Digital download, streaming	25	—	—	—	—	—	—	—	—	—		
"—" denotes a recording that did not chart or was not released in that territory.

== Extended plays ==
List of extended plays, with selected chart positions
Title	EP details	Peak chart positions		
Title	EP details	US	US R&B /HH	US Rap
My Brother's Keeper (Long Live G)	Released: November 20, 2020; Label: SCMG, Interscope; Formats: Digital download, streaming	40	19	17
Back on My Baby Jesus Sh!t Again	Released: November 12, 2021; Label: SCMG, Interscope; Formats: Digital download, streaming	44	19	14
Call da Fireman	Released: May 5, 2023; Label: SCMG, Interscope; Formats: Digital download, streaming	—	—	—
Let's Do It	Released: October 13, 2023; Label: SCMG, Interscope; Formats: Digital download, streaming	—	—	—
Ghetto Superstar: (The Intro)	Released: May 3, 2024; Label: SCMG, Interscope; Formats: Digital download, streaming	—	—	—
"—" denotes a recording that did not chart or was not released in that territory.

== Mixtapes ==
Title	Mixtape details	Peak chart positions	Certifications
Title	Mixtape details	US	Certifications
NonFiction	Released: April 7, 2015; Format: Digital download, streaming	—	
So Disrespectful	Released: September 26, 2015; Format: Digital download, streaming	—	
The 10 Minute Mixtape	Released: November 16, 2015; Format: Digital download, streaming	—	
God's Work	Released: June 9, 2016; Format: Digital download, streaming	—	
God's Work Resurrected	Released: December 2, 2016; Format: Digital download, streaming	—	
Baby Talk	Released: January 23, 2017; Format: Digital download, streaming	—	
Baby Talk 2	Released: March 31, 2017; Format: Digital download, streaming	—	
Billion Dollar Baby	Released: June 16, 2017; Format: Digital download, streaming	—	
Baby Talk 3	Released: August 18, 2017; Format: Digital download, streaming	—	
Back On My Baby Jesus Shit	Released: November 17, 2017; Format: Digital download, streaming	—	
Baby Talk 4	Released: December 25, 2017; Format: Digital download, streaming	—	
Baby Talk 5	Released: June 1, 2018; Format: Digital download, streaming	—	
Blank Blank	Released: November 2, 2018; Format: Digital download, streaming	—	RIAA: Gold
How TF Is This a Mixtape?	Released: September 27, 2024; Format: Digital download, streaming	154	
Please Say DaBaby, Vol. 1	Released: April 26, 2025; Format: Digital download, streaming	—	
"—" denotes a recording that did not chart or was not released in that territory.

=== Collaborative mixtapes ===
List of collaborative mixtapes with selected chart positions
Title	Mixtape details	Peak chart positions			
Title	Mixtape details	US	US R&B /HH	US Rap	CAN
Better than You (with YoungBoy Never Broke Again)	Released: March 4, 2022; Label: SCMG, Interscope, Never Broke Again, Atlantic; Format: Digital download, streaming	10	7	5	62

== Singles ==
=== As lead artist ===
Title	Year	Peak chart positions										Certifications	Album
Title	Year	US	US R&B /HH	AUS	CAN	IRE	NLD	NZ	SWE	UK	WW	Certifications	Album
"Light Show"	2016	—	— (Note: "Light Show" did not enter the Hot R&B/Hip-Hop Songs chart, but peaked at number 29 on the Mainstream R&B/Hip-Hop chart.)	—	—	—	—	—	—	—	—		God's Work and God's Work Resurrected
"Comin' Over" (featuring DJ Luke Nasty)	2017	—	—	—	—	—	—	—	—	—	—		Billion Dollar Baby
"Big Butt"	2017	—	—	—	—	—	—	—	—	—	—		Billion Dollar Baby
"Pull Up Music"	2017	—	—	—	—	—	—	—	—	—	—		Back On My Baby Jesus Shit
"Walker Texas Ranger"	2019	—	—	—	—	—	—	—	—	—	—	RIAA: Platinum	Blank Blank and Baby on Baby
"FuckYouTalmBout Freestyle" (with Chophouze) (Note: "FuckYouTalmBout Freestyle" was originally released to DaBaby's Spinrilla account as a solo release, but was later released to major streaming platforms with producer Chophouze credited as the lead artist and DaBaby credited as a featured artist.)	2019	—	—	—	—	—	—	—	—	—	—		Non-album singles
"Mini Van" (with BlocBoy JB)	2019	—	—	—	—	—	—	—	—	—	—		Non-album singles
"Crazy" (with Str8Barz)	2019	—	—	—	—	—	—	—	—	—	—		Non-album singles
"Baby on Baby Out Now Freestyle"	2019	—	—	—	—	—	—	—	—	—	—		Non-album singles
"Suge"	2019	7	3	58	32	65	—	— (Note: "Suge" did not enter the NZ Top 40 Singles Chart, but peaked at number 17 on the NZ Hot Singles Chart.)	—	—	—	RIAA: 7× Platinum; ARIA: Platinum; BPI: Silver; MC: Platinum; RMNZ: Platinum	Baby on Baby
"I'm a Star" (with Locx)	2019	—	—	—	—	—	—	—	—	—	—		Non-album single
"Baby" (with Quality Control and Lil Baby)	2019	21	11	—	54	—	—	— (Note: "Baby" did not enter the NZ Top 40 Singles Chart, but peaked at number 13 on the NZ Hot Singles Chart.)	—	—	—	RMNZ: Gold	Control the Streets, Volume 2
"Duck Sauce" (with Saint Vinci)	2019	—	—	—	—	—	—	—	—	—	—		Non-album single
"Baby Sitter" (featuring Offset)	2019	59	28	—	—	—	—	—	—	—	—	RIAA: 2× Platinum	Baby on Baby
"Gucci Bag Latina" (with Zaweso del Patio, 2Sober, and Jungle)	2019	—	—	—	—	—	—	—	—	—	—		Non-album singles
"Coochie Bag" (with 2Sober, Chxna, NRG Rose, 20Vision, and Tanya Stephens)	2019	—	—	—	—	—	—	—	—	—	—		Non-album singles
"Panini (DaBaby Remix)" (with Lil Nas X)	2019	—	—	—	—	—	—	— (Note: "Panini (DaBaby Remix)" did not enter the NZ Top 40 Singles Chart, but peaked at number 14 on the NZ Hot Singles Chart.)	—	—	—		Non-album singles
"Intro"	2019	13	8	—	26	70	—	— (Note: "Intro" did not enter the NZ Top 40 Singles Chart, but peaked at number six on the NZ Hot Singles Chart.)	—	97	—	RIAA: Platinum	Kirk
"Bop"	2019	11	4	63	23	39	100	38	—	66	—	RIAA: 6× Platinum; ARIA: Platinum; BPI: Gold; RMNZ: Platinum	Kirk
"Shut Up"	2020	—	—	—	—	—	—	—	—	—	—		Non-album single
"Oprah's Bank Account" (with Lil Yachty featuring Drake)	2020	55	32	93	38	—	—	— (Note: "Oprah's Bank Account" did not enter the NZ Top 40 Singles Chart, but peaked at number three on the NZ Hot Singles Chart.)	—	54	—	RIAA: Platinum; ARIA: Gold; RMNZ: Gold	Lil Boat 3
"Vibez"	2020	21	12	—	40	68	—	— (Note: "Vibez" did not enter the NZ Top 40 Singles Chart, but peaked at number 29 on the NZ Hot Singles Chart.)	—	—	—	RIAA: 3× Platinum; ARIA: Gold; BPI: Silver; RMNZ: Platinum	Kirk
"Find My Way"	2020	22	12	47	33	25	—	— (Note: "Find My Way" did not enter the NZ Top 40 Singles Chart, but peaked at number two on the NZ Hot Singles Chart.)	—	46	—	RIAA: Platinum	Blame It on Baby
"Rockstar" (featuring Roddy Ricch)	2020	1	1	1	1	1	1	1	3	1	8	RIAA: 8× Platinum; ARIA: 5× Platinum; BPI: 3× Platinum; MC: 8× Platinum; NVPI: Gold; RMNZ: 5× Platinum	Blame It on Baby
"No Dribble" (with Stunna 4 Vegas)	2020	92	36	—	—	—	—	—	—	—	—	RIAA: Gold	Blame It on Baby (Deluxe)
"Peep Hole"	2020	— (Note: "Peep Hole" did not enter the Billboard Hot 100, but peaked at number four on the Bubbling Under Hot 100 chart.)	46	—	—	—	—	— (Note: "Peep Hole" did not enter the NZ Top 40 Singles Chart, but peaked at number 17 on the NZ Hot Singles Chart.)	—	—	—	RIAA: Gold	Blame It on Baby (Deluxe)
"Blind" (featuring Young Thug)	2020	74	30	—	82	—	—	— (Note: "Blind" did not enter the NZ Top 40 Singles Chart, but peaked at number 9 on the NZ Hot Singles Chart.)	—	—	—	RIAA: Platinum; RMNZ: Gold	Blame It on Baby (Deluxe)
"Masterpiece"	2021	55	20	—	71	—	—	— (Note: "Masterpiece" did not enter the NZ Top 40 Singles Chart, but peaked at number 10 on the NZ Hot Singles Chart.)	—	—	93	RIAA: 2× Platinum	Non-album single
"Throat Baby (Go Baby) [Remix]" (with BRS Kash and City Girls)	2021	—	—	—	—	—	—	— (Note: "Throat Baby (Go Baby) [Remix]" did not enter the NZ Top 40 Singles Chart, but peaked at number 29 on the NZ Hot Singles Chart.)	—	—	—		Kash Only
"Ball If I Want To"	2021	39	13	—	48	—	—	— (Note: "Ball If I Want To" did not enter the NZ Top 40 Singles Chart, but peaked at number eight on the NZ Hot Singles Chart.)	—	—	60	RIAA: Platinum	Non-album singles
"Red Light Green Light"	2021	50	19	—	50	—	—	— (Note: "Red Light Green Light" did not enter the NZ Top 40 Singles Chart, but peaked at number 14 on the NZ Hot Singles Chart.)	—	—	74	RIAA: Platinum	Non-album singles
"Lonely" (with Lil Wayne)	2021	63	28	—	86	—	—	— (Note: "Lonely" did not enter the NZ Top 40 Singles Chart, but peaked at number 26 on the NZ Hot Singles Chart.)	—	—	125	RIAA: Platinum	Non-album singles
"Hit" (with YoungBoy Never Broke Again)	2022	— (Note: "Hit" did not enter the Billboard Hot 100, but peaked at number 25 on the Bubbling Under Hot 100 chart.)	—	—	—	—	—	—	—	—	—		Better than You
"Neighborhood Superstar" (with YoungBoy Never Broke Again)	2022	89	31	—	—	—	—	— (Note: "Neighborhood Superstar" did not enter the NZ Top 40 Singles Chart, but peaked at number 33 on the NZ Hot Singles Chart.)	—	—	—	RIAA: Gold	Better than You
"Bestie" (with YoungBoy Never Broke Again)	2022	— (Note: "Bestie" did not enter the Billboard Hot 100, but peaked at number 13 on the Bubbling Under Hot 100 chart.)	43	—	—	—	—	—	—	—	—	RIAA: Platinum	Better than You
"Wig" (with Moneybagg Yo)	2022	—	—	—	—	—	—	—	—	—	—		Non-album singles
"Bonnet" (featuring Pooh Shiesty)	2022	—	—	—	—	—	—	—	—	—	—		Non-album singles
"Showing Off Her Body" (with Davido)	2022	—	—	—	—	—	—	—	—	—	—		Non-album singles
"Tough Skin"	2022	—	—	—	—	—	—	—	—	—	—		Non-album singles
"Waitress"	2022	—	—	—	—	—	—	—	—	—	—		Non-album singles
"Joc in 06"	2022	—	—	—	—	—	—	—	—	—	—		Non-album singles
"Hate It or Love It" (with Rob49)	2023	—	—	—	—	—	—	—	—	—	—		4God II
"Shake Sumn"	2023	65	18	—	—	—	—	—	—	—	—	RIAA: Platinum	Call da Fireman
"Trickin'"	2023	—	—	—	—	—	—	—	—	—	—		Non-album single
"Point Em Out" (with That Mexican OT)	2024	— (Note: "Point Em Out" did not enter the Billboard Hot 100, but peaked at number eight on the Bubbling Under Hot 100 chart.)	44	—	—	—	—	—	—	—	—		Texas Technician
"Did It"	2024	—	—	—	—	—	—	—	—	—	—		How TF Is This a Mixtape?
"Can't Keep Keisha"	2024	—	—	—	—	—	—	—	—	—	—		How TF Is This a Mixtape?
"Letter to My YN"	2025	—	—	—	—	—	—	— (Note: "Letter to My YN" did not enter the NZ Top 40 Singles Chart, but peaked at number 39 on the NZ Hot Singles Chart.)	—	—	—		Be More Grateful
"Out Ya Business"	2025	—	—	—	—	—	—	—	—	—	—		Be More Grateful
"Paper Low"	2025	—	—	—	—	—	—	— (Note: "Paper Low" did not enter the NZ Top 40 Singles Chart, but peaked at number 17 on the NZ Hot Singles Chart.)	—	—	—		Be More Grateful
"PBJT"	2025	—	—	—	—	—	—	—	—	—	—		Be More Grateful
"Don't Insult Me"	2026	—	—	—	—	—	—	—	—	—	—		Be More Grateful
"Pop Dat Thang"	2026	26	5	45	49	50	—	40	—	86	126	RIAA: Gold; RMNZ: Gold	Be More Grateful
"—" denotes a recording that did not chart, was not eligible to chart, or was not released in that territory.

=== As featured artist ===
Title	Year	Peak chart positions										Certifications	Album
Title	Year	US	US R&B /HH	AUS	CAN	IRE	NLD	NZ	SWE	UK	WW	Certifications	Album
"All I Ever Wanted" (Moonie Music featuring DaBaby)	2017	—	—	—	—	—	—	—	—	—	—		The Bar Show 2 (Best Kept Secret)
"Struggle Baby" (Lil Jr. featuring Just Raven and DaBaby)	2017	—	—	—	—	—	—	—	—	—	—		Non-album singles
"Litty City" (Zac Keelo featuring DaBaby)	2017	—	—	—	—	—	—	—	—	—	—		Non-album singles
"High Rollin" (B.Hill featuring DaBaby)	2017	—	—	—	—	—	—	—	—	—	—		Non-album singles
"Ready" (DJ Jayy Hawk featuring Luke Nasty, Ricco Barrino, and DaBaby)	2017	—	—	—	—	—	—	—	—	—	—		Non-album singles
"Killa Cam" (Def Smove featuring DaBaby)	2017	—	—	—	—	—	—	—	—	—	—		Non-album singles
"Bank Roll" (Beach Bumz featuring DaBaby)	2018	—	—	—	—	—	—	—	—	—	—		#BeachBumz and Gelato
"Clubbin'" (Deejaytrap featuring Jxhines, DaBaby, and Yung Reason)	2018	—	—	—	—	—	—	—	—	—	—		Non-album single
"I Did" (DJ Luke Nasty featuring DaBaby)	2018	—	—	—	—	—	—	—	—	—	—		Cruise Control and Distractions
"Came from Nothing" (Ja'vee featuring DaBaby and Chophouze)	2018	—	—	—	—	—	—	—	—	—	—		They Gon Feel Me
"Hello" (SKZIY featuring DaBaby)	2018	—	—	—	—	—	—	—	—	—	—		Shit Don't Stop
"No Time" (D-Froz featuring DaBaby)	2018	—	—	—	—	—	—	—	—	—	—		Non-album single
"Wait a Minute" (NewCharlotte Saint featuring DaBaby)	2018	—	—	—	—	—	—	—	—	—	—		Saint the Album
"Blue Strips" (Gabby Dinero featuring DaBaby)	2018	—	—	—	—	—	—	—	—	—	—		Princess Prophet
"Hotline" (Producer20 featuring Jayway Sosa, DaBaby, and IV Montana)	2018	—	—	—	—	—	—	—	—	—	—		Non-album singles
"Sing" (Shawn Scrilla featuring DaBaby)	2018	—	—	—	—	—	—	—	—	—	—		Non-album singles
"How They Gon Eat" (Jerry White featuring DaBaby)	2018	—	—	—	—	—	—	—	—	—	—		Non-album singles
"Animal" (Stunna 4 Vegas featuring DaBaby)	2018	—	—	—	—	—	—	—	—	—	—		Non-album singles
"Juice" (Loudpack Leaf featuring DaBaby)	2018	—	—	—	—	—	—	—	—	—	—		Non-album singles
"Goin' Live on Em" (Micmanordj featuring DaBaby and Jayway Sosa)	2018	—	—	—	—	—	—	—	—	—	—		Non-album singles
"Draco" (Kash Addison featuring DaBaby)	2019	—	—	—	—	—	—	—	—	—	—		Non-album singles
"For the Team" (Str8 Cash Flowz featuring DaBaby and Eurogotit)	2019	—	—	—	—	—	—	—	—	—	—		Non-album singles
"On the Run" (G Step featuring DaBaby)	2019	—	—	—	—	—	—	—	—	—	—		Hood Allegations
"Lit" (Kam Hicks featuring DaBaby, Ricky Ruckus, and Roscoe Dash)	2019	—	—	—	—	—	—	—	—	—	—		Bigger
"She the Plug" (HeroGawd featuring DaBaby)	2019	—	—	—	—	—	—	—	—	—	—		Non-album singles
"Wave" (Money Counta Nard featuring Jayway Sosa and DaBaby)	2019	—	—	—	—	—	—	—	—	—	—		Non-album singles
"You Heard Now" (Young Money Yawn featuring DaBaby)	2019	—	—	—	—	—	—	—	—	—	—		Street Gospel 4
"Colors" (K Dos featuring DaBaby)	2019	—	—	—	—	—	—	—	—	—	—		Bombs
"Scared to Book Me" (Baebae Savo featuring DaBaby)	2019	—	—	—	—	—	—	—	—	—	—		Non-album single
"Look at God" (Garcia Vega featuring DaBaby)	2019	—	—	—	—	—	—	—	—	—	—		Trap Gospel
"Bust It" (2 Sober featuring DaBaby and Petey Pablo)	2019	—	—	—	—	—	—	—	—	—	—		Non-album singles
"Double or Nothin'" (Semi Sixteenz featuring DaBaby)	2019	—	—	—	—	—	—	—	—	—	—		Non-album singles
"Cash Shit" (Megan Thee Stallion featuring DaBaby)	2019	36	16	—	—	—	—	—	—	—	—	RIAA: 3× Platinum	Fever
"Did It" (YQ Dreams featuring DaBaby)	2019	—	—	—	—	—	—	—	—	—	—		Non-album singles
"Baby Shower" (Jamz featuring Lil Baby and DaBaby)	2019	—	—	—	—	—	—	—	—	—	—		Non-album singles
"Back Up Off Me" (704 Baggz featuring DaBaby)	2019	—	—	—	—	—	—	—	—	—	—		Non-album singles
"No Cap Zone" (Succeed Phlyguy featuring Stunna 4 Vegas and DaBaby)	2019	—	—	—	—	—	—	—	—	—	—		Non-album singles
"Pamper" (MrPostman featuring DaBaby)	2019	—	—	—	—	—	—	—	—	—	—		Non-album singles
"Power (Remix)" (Doobie featuring DaBaby and Icewear Vezzo)	2019	—	—	—	—	—	—	—	—	—	—		Non-album singles
"Freaky Dancer" (YK Osiris featuring DaBaby)	2019	—	—	—	—	—	—	—	—	—	—		Non-album singles
"One Phone Call" (Sy Ari Da Kid and Paxquiao featuring DaBaby)	2019	—	—	—	—	—	—	—	—	—	—		2 Sides of a Story
"Bag Mode" (Ou'ri Cuatros featuring DaBaby)	2019	—	—	—	—	—	—	—	—	—	—		Twin Dragons
"Cool" (Geezy Escobar featuring DaBaby)	2019	—	—	—	—	—	—	—	—	—	—		Section 8 Mind State
"What I Like" (Rob J featuring DaBaby)	2019	—	—	—	—	—	—	—	—	—	—		Non-album single
"Truth Hurts (DaBaby Remix)" (Lizzo featuring DaBaby)	2019	—	—	—	—	—	—	—	—	—	—		Cuz I Love You (Super Deluxe Japanese Edition)
"In & Out" (YHN Balla featuring DaBaby)	2019	—	—	—	—	—	—	—	—	—	—		Non-album singles
"Splash" (Spiro featuring DaBaby)	2019	—	—	—	—	—	—	—	—	—	—		Non-album singles
"Richer Than Errybody" (Gucci Mane featuring YoungBoy Never Broke Again and DaBaby)	2019	—	— (Note: "Richer Than Errybody" did not enter the Hot R&B/Hip-Hop Songs chart, but peaked at number four on the Bubbling Under R&B/Hip-Hop Singles chart.)	—	—	—	—	—	—	—	—		Woptober II
"Enemies" (Post Malone featuring DaBaby)	2019	16	9	28	15	—	32	37	—	—	—	RIAA: Platinum; ARIA: Platinum; BPI: Silver; MC: 3× Platinum; RMNZ: Platinum	Hollywood's Bleeding
"Heartless" (Viic Flair featuring DaBaby)	2019	—	—	—	—	—	—	—	—	—	—		Non-album singles
"Act Out" (Gatti800 featuring DaBaby)	2019	—	—	—	—	—	—	—	—	—	—		Non-album singles
"100 P's" (Tone Tone featuring DaBaby)	2019	—	—	—	—	—	—	—	—	—	—		Non-album singles
"Hot Shower" (Chance the Rapper featuring MadeinTYO and DaBaby)	2019	58	24	—	69	—	—	— (Note: "Hot Shower" did not enter the NZ Top 40 Singles Chart, but peaked at number 11 on the NZ Hot Singles Chart.)	—	—	—		The Big Day
"No Time" (re-release) (D-Major featuring DaBaby)	2019	—	—	—	—	—	—	—	—	—	—		Non-album singles
"Boss Friends" (Plies featuring DaBaby)	2019	—	—	—	—	—	—	—	—	—	—		Non-album singles
"Death" (Trippie Redd featuring DaBaby)	2019	59	27	—	58	—	—	—	—	—	—	RIAA: Platinum	A Love Letter to You 4
"1+1" (Akevius featuring DaBaby)	2019	—	—	—	—	—	—	—	—	—	—		Non-album single
"Like a Pro" (Blac Youngsta featuring DaBaby)	2019	—	—	—	—	—	—	—	—	—	—		Church on Sunday
"Suboxone" (Munk featuring Shakewell and DaBaby)	2019	—	—	—	—	—	—	—	—	—	—		Non-album single
"My Oh My" (Camila Cabello featuring DaBaby or remix also featuring Gunna)	2020	12	—	19	13	6	90	15	46	13	—	RIAA: 2× Platinum; ARIA: Platinum; BPI: Platinum; RMNZ: 2× Platinum	Romance
"Obama" (Blueface featuring DaBaby)	2020	—	—	—	—	—	—	—	—	—	—		Find the Beat
"Life Is Good (Remix)" (Future featuring Drake, DaBaby, and Lil Baby)	2020	—	—	—	—	—	—	— (Note: "Life Is Good (Remix)" did not enter the NZ Top 40 Singles Chart, but peaked at number 20 on the NZ Hot Singles Chart.)	—	—	—		High Off Life
"On Top" (Hollywood Hemi featuring DaBaby)	2020	—	—	—	—	—	—	—	—	—	—		Non-album singles
"Fucked Up" (Charlie Korman featuring DaBaby)	2020	—	—	—	—	—	—	—	—	—	—		Non-album singles
"S.O.E" (HotBoy Lil Shaq featuring DaBaby)	2020	—	—	—	—	—	—	—	—	—	—		Non-album singles
"Levi High" (DaniLeigh featuring DaBaby)	2020	—	— (Note: "Levi High" did not enter the Hot R&B/Hip-Hop Songs chart, but peaked at number 32 on the Rhythmic Songs chart.)	—	—	—	—	—	—	—	—		Movie
"Buss It Down" (Iamkeynotes featuring DaBaby and Petey Pablo)	2020	—	—	—	—	—	—	—	—	—	—		Non-album singles
"Don't Rush (Remix)" (Young T & Bugsey featuring DaBaby)	2020	—	—	—	—	—	—	—	—	—	—		Non-album singles
"Whats Poppin (Remix)" (Jack Harlow featuring DaBaby, Tory Lanez, and Lil Wayne)	2020	2	2	—	4	—	—	— (Note: "Whats Poppin (Remix)" did not enter the NZ Top 40 Singles Chart, but peaked at number three on the NZ Hot Singles Chart.)	—	—	17		Thats What They All Say
"Stuntin' on You" (Tyla Yaweh featuring DaBaby)	2020	—	— (Note: "Stuntin' on You" did not enter the Hot R&B/Hip-Hop Songs chart, but peaked at number 26 on the Rhythmic Songs chart.)	—	—	—	—	— (Note: "Stuntin' on You" did not enter the NZ Top 40 Singles Chart, but peaked at number 13 on the NZ Hot Singles Chart.)	—	—	—	RIAA: Gold; RMNZ: Gold	Non-album singles
"Tap In (Remix)" (Saweetie featuring Post Malone, DaBaby, and Jack Harlow)	2020	—	—	—	—	—	—	— (Note: "Tap In (Remix)" did not enter the NZ Top 40 Singles Chart, but peaked at number 11 on the NZ Hot Singles Chart.)	—	—	—		Non-album singles
"Said Sum (Remix)" (Moneybagg Yo featuring City Girls and DaBaby)	2020	—	—	—	—	—	—	—	—	—	—		Code Red
"Molly (Remix)" (Foogiano featuring DaBaby)	2020	—	—	—	—	—	—	—	—	—	—		Gutta Baby
"Levitating" (Note: Three versions of "Levitating" were released as singles: the original solo version, which appears on Future Nostalgia, The Blessed Madonna remix featuring Madonna and Missy Elliott, which appears on Club Future Nostalgia, and the remix featuring DaBaby, which appears on the digital, bonus, and French CD editions of Future Nostalgia. Chart positions and certifications are for regions where DaBaby is credited.) (Dua Lipa featuring DaBaby)	2020	2	—	—	1	—	23	5	—	—	2	MC: 3× Platinum; RMNZ: 6× Platinum	Future Nostalgia
"For the Night" (Pop Smoke featuring Lil Baby and DaBaby)	2020	6	4	13	7	14	15	9	18	15	7	RIAA: 8× Platinum; ARIA: 2× Platinum; BPI: Platinum; RMNZ: 3× Platinum	Shoot for the Stars, Aim for the Moon
"Nah Nah Nah (Remix)" (Kanye West featuring DaBaby and 2 Chainz)	2020	—	—	—	—	—	—	— (Note: "Nah Nah Nah (Remix)" did not enter the NZ Top 40 Singles Chart, but peaked at number 34 on the NZ Hot Singles Chart.)	—	—	—		Non-album single
"Coco" (24kGoldn featuring DaBaby)	2020	—	—	—	78	83	—	— (Note: "Coco" did not enter the NZ Top 40 Singles Chart, but peaked at number nine on the NZ Hot Singles Chart.)	—	—	—	RIAA: Gold; MC: Gold	El Dorado
"Cry Baby" (Megan Thee Stallion featuring DaBaby)	2021	28	13	—	86	91	—	—	—	—	66	RIAA: Platinum	Good News
"Beat Box 3" (Note: Billboard charts use a combined total from all versions of the song to calculate the song's peak and credits both Pooh Shiesty, who was on "Beat Box 2", and DaBaby as featured artists.) (SpotemGottem featuring DaBaby)	2021	12	6	—	55	—	—	— (Note: "Beat Box 3" did not enter the NZ Top 40 Singles Chart, but peaked at number 21 on the NZ Hot Singles Chart.)	—	—	38		Most Wanted
"Period" (Boosie Badazz featuring DaBaby)	2021	—	—	—	—	—	—	—	—	—	—		Goat Talk 3
"Girl from Rio (Remix)" (Anitta featuring DaBaby)	2021	—	— (Note: "Girl from Rio (Remix)" did not enter the Hot R&B/Hip-Hop Songs chart, but peaked at number 33 on the Rhythmic Songs chart.)	—	—	—	—	—	—	—	—		Non-album single
"I Did It" (DJ Khaled featuring Post Malone, Megan Thee Stallion, Lil Baby, and DaBaby)	2021	43	17	99	22	48	—	— (Note: "I Did It" did not enter the NZ Top 40 Singles Chart, but peaked at number seven on the NZ Hot Singles Chart.)	50	53	33	RIAA: Gold	Khaled Khaled
"Get Fly" (OhGeesy featuring DaBaby)	2021	— (Note: "Get Fly" did not enter the Billboard Hot 100, but peaked at number 22 on the Bubbling Under Hot 100 chart.)	—	—	—	—	—	— (Note: "Get Fly" did not enter the NZ Top 40 Singles Chart, but peaked at number 29 on the NZ Hot Singles Chart.)	—	—	—		GeezyWorld
"Drop" (Yo Gotti featuring DaBaby)	2021	—	—	—	—	—	—	—	—	—	—		CM10: Free Game (Deluxe)
"Skat" (Tory Lanez featuring DaBaby)	2021	— (Note: "Skat" did not enter the Billboard Hot 100, but peaked at number five on the Bubbling Under Hot 100 chart.)	47	—	83	—	—	— (Note: "Skat" did not enter the NZ Top 40 Singles Chart, but peaked at number 24 on the NZ Hot Singles Chart.)	—	—	—		Non-album singles
"Demon" (Rich Dunk featuring DaBaby)	2021	—	—	—	—	—	—	—	—	—	—		Non-album singles
"Yeah B*tch" (Kayykilo featuring DaBaby)	2021	—	—	—	—	—	—	—	—	—	—		Cutthroat Love Letter
"Twinnem" (Remix) (Coi Leray featuring DaBaby)	2021	—	—	—	—	—	—	—	—	—	—		Non-album singles
"Talk to Me" (Feder featuring DaBaby, Blacc Zacc, and Dayytona Fox)	2022	—	—	—	—	—	—	—	—	—	—		Non-album singles
"Luv N Hip-Hop" (Finesse2tymes featuring DaBaby)	2022	—	—	—	—	—	—	—	—	—	—		Non-album singles
"06 Gucci" (Gucci Mane featuring DaBaby and 21 Savage)	2023	— (Note: "06 Gucci" did not enter the Billboard Hot 100, but peaked at number 21 on the Bubbling Under Hot 100 chart.)	42	—	—	—	—	—	—	—	—		Breath of Fresh Air
"Perfect" (Icewear Vezzo featuring DaBaby)	2024	—	—	—	—	—	—	—	—	—	—		Live from the 6
"She Can Get It" (H3adband featuring DaBaby)	2026	—	—	—	—	—	—	—	—	—	—		Non-album single
"—" denotes a recording that did not chart, was not eligible to chart, or was not released in that territory.

== Other charted and certified songs ==
Title	Year	Peak chart positions						Certifications	Album
Title	Year	US	US R&B /HH	CAN	IRE	NZ Hot	WW	Certifications	Album
"Next Song"	2018	—	—	—	—	—	—	RIAA: Platinum	Blank Blank
"21"	2018	—	— (Note: "21" did not enter the Hot R&B/Hip-Hop Songs chart, but peaked at number four on the Bubbling Under R&B/Hip-Hop Singles chart.)	—	—	—	—	RIAA: Platinum	Blank Blank
"Today"	2018	—	—	—	—	—	—	RIAA: Gold	Baby Talk 5
"Taking It Out"	2019	—	—	—	—	—	—	RIAA: Gold	Baby on Baby
"Goin Baby"	2019	— (Note: "Goin Baby" did not enter the Billboard Hot 100, but peaked at number four on the Bubbling Under Hot 100 chart.)	46	—	—	—	—	RIAA: 2× Platinum	Baby on Baby
"Pony"	2019	—	—	—	—	—	—	RIAA: Gold	Baby on Baby
"Ashley" (Stunna 4 Vegas featuring DaBaby)	2019	—	— (Note: "Ashley" did not enter the Hot R&B/Hip-Hop Songs chart, but peaked at number six on the Bubbling Under R&B/Hip-Hop Singles chart.)	—	—	—	—		Big 4x
"Under the Sun" (Dreamville, J. Cole and Lute featuring DaBaby)	2019	44	18	72	—	5	—	RIAA: Platinum; RMNZ: Platinum	Revenge of the Dreamers III
"Pink Toes" (with Quality Control and Offset featuring Gunna)	2019	—	— (Note: "Pink Toes" did not enter the Hot R&B/Hip-Hop Songs chart, but peaked at number seven on the Bubbling Under R&B/Hip-Hop Singles chart.)	—	—	—	—		Control the Streets, Volume 2
"Off the Rip"	2019	47	24	—	—	—	—	RIAA: Gold	Kirk
"Pop Star" (featuring Kevin Gates)	2019	49	25	97	—	—	—	RIAA: Platinum	Kirk
"Gospel" (featuring Chance the Rapper, Gucci Mane, and YK Osiris)	2019	55	32	82	—	19	—	RIAA: Gold	Kirk
"iPhone" (with Nicki Minaj)	2019	43	22	72	—	—	—	RIAA: Gold	Kirk
"Toes" (featuring Lil Baby and Moneybagg Yo)	2019	28	16	40	63	17	—	RIAA: 3× Platinum; RMNZ: Gold	Kirk
"Really" (featuring Stunna 4 Vegas)	2019	63	30	—	—	—	—		Kirk
"Prolly Heard"	2019	73	38	—	—	—	—	RIAA: Gold	Kirk
"Raw Shit" (featuring Migos)	2019	51	27	73	—	18	—	RIAA: Gold	Kirk
"There He Go"	2019	89	46	—	—	—	—		Kirk
"XXL"	2019	69	36	—	82	—	—	RIAA: Gold	Kirk
"Protect da Brand" (Moneybagg Yo featuring DaBaby)	2020	89	44	—	—	—	—	RIAA: Gold	Time Served
"Stain" (A Boogie wit da Hoodie featuring DaBaby)	2020	80	38	—	—	39	—		Artist 2.0
"Can't Stop"	2020	63	27	86	—	—	—		Blame It on Baby
"Pick Up" (featuring Quavo)	2020	44	19	78	—	8	—	RIAA: Gold	Blame It on Baby
"Lightskin Shit" (featuring Future and JetsonMade)	2020	53	21	—	—	11	—	RIAA: Gold	Blame It on Baby
"Talk About It"	2020	74	34	—	—	—	—		Blame It on Baby
"Sad Shit"	2020	69	31	—	—	—	—		Blame It on Baby
"Jump" (featuring YoungBoy Never Broke Again)	2020	17	9	62	77	12	—	RIAA: Platinum	Blame It on Baby
"Champion"	2020	85	40	—	—	—	—		Blame It on Baby
"Drop" (featuring A Boogie wit da Hoodie and London on da Track)	2020	71	32	—	—	—	—		Blame It on Baby
"Blame It on Baby"	2020	64	28	77	—	—	—	RIAA: Gold	Blame It on Baby
"Nasty" (featuring Ashanti and Megan Thee Stallion)	2020	50	20	—	—	—	—	RIAA: Platinum	Blame It on Baby
"Amazing Grace"	2020	— (Note: "Amazing Grace" did not enter the Billboard Hot 100, but peaked at number four on the Bubbling Under Hot 100 chart.)	—	—	—	—	—		Blame It on Baby
"Thug of Spades" (YoungBoy Never Broke Again featuring DaBaby)	2020	99	49	—	—	—	—		38 Baby 2
"Practice"	2020	86	33	—	—	—	180	RIAA: 2× Platinum	Blame It on Baby (Deluxe)
"Brother's Keeper"	2020	— (Note: "Brother's Keeper" did not enter the Billboard Hot 100, but peaked at number 11 on the Bubbling Under Hot 100 chart.)	—	—	—	30	—		My Brother's Keeper (Long Live G)
"Gucci Peacoat"	2020	— (Note: "Gucci Peacoat" did not enter the Billboard Hot 100, but peaked at number six on the Bubbling Under Hot 100 chart.)	46	—	—	29	—		My Brother's Keeper (Long Live G)
"Handgun" (featuring NoCap and Polo G)	2020	—	—	—	—	20	—		My Brother's Keeper (Long Live G)
"Know No Better" (Justin Bieber featuring DaBaby)	2021	—	—	—	—	35	—		Justice (Triple Chucks Deluxe)
"Litty" (Young Stoner Life and Young Thug featuring DaBaby)	2021	— (Note: "Litty" did not enter the Billboard Hot 100, but peaked at number 25 on the Bubbling Under Hot 100 chart.)	—	—	—	32	—		Slime Language 2 (Deluxe)
"Party Lyfe" (Polo G featuring DaBaby)	2021	85	37	64	—	10	126		Hall of Fame
"Jail, Pt. 2" (Kanye West featuring DaBaby and Marilyn Manson)	2021	63	31	60	—	—	60		Donda
"Roof"	2021	— (Note: "Roof" did not enter the Billboard Hot 100, but peaked at number two on the Bubbling Under Hot 100 chart.)	32	—	—	37	—	RIAA: Gold	Back on My Baby Jesus Sh!t Again
"Sticked Up" (featuring 21 Savage)	2021	— (Note: "Sticked Up" did not enter the Billboard Hot 100, but peaked at number 23 on the Bubbling Under Hot 100 chart.)	—	—	—	—	—		Back on My Baby Jesus Sh!t Again
"On This Line" (with YoungBoy Never Broke Again)	2022	— (Note: "On This Line" did not enter the Billboard Hot 100, but peaked at number 15 on the Bubbling Under Hot 100 chart.)	—	—	—	—	—		Better than You
"WiFi" (with YoungBoy Never Broke Again)	2022	— (Note: "WiFi" did not enter the Billboard Hot 100, but peaked at number 19 on the Bubbling Under Hot 100 chart.)	—	—	—	—	—		Better than You
"Turbo" (with YoungBoy Never Broke Again)	2022	— (Note: "Turbo" did not enter the Billboard Hot 100, but peaked at number five on the Bubbling Under Hot 100 chart.)	46	—	—	—	—		Better than You
"Socks"	2022	— (Note: "Socks" did not enter the Billboard Hot 100, but peaked at number 14 on the Bubbling Under Hot 100 chart.)	41	—	—	—	—		Baby on Baby 2
"Phat"	2024	—	—	—	—	—	—	RIAA: Gold	HOW TF IS THIS A MIXTAPE?
"Don Julio Lemonade"	2026	— (Note: "Don Julio Lemonade" did not enter the Billboard Hot 100, but peaked at number 19 on the Bubbling Under Hot 100 chart.)	46	—	—	32	—		Be More Grateful
"—" denotes a recording that did not chart, was not eligible to chart, or was not released in that territory.

== Guest appearances ==
List of non-single guest appearances, with other performing artists, showing year released and album name
Title	Year	Other artist(s)	Album
"The Dealer"	2017	Deniro Farrar	Guilty Until Proven Innocent
"Plug Best Friend"	2017	CFN TrapGod	Born to Flex and Came from Nothin
"Vert"	2017	Quis Famous	Patience
"Literally"	2018	DJ E.Sudd, Sequence, Deniro Farrar	Still Servin
"I Shoulda Told Ya"	2018	Skully	It's Up There
"Sauced"	2018	N.F.L Nique	Ready or Not
"Hiccups"	2018	Lil Dre KND	Over Kill 2
"I'm Used to It"	2018	2deuce Corleone	Street Poetry
"In Charlotte"	2018	YajGrindin	Yaj Grindin'
"Woah"	2018	Rad BlueBillz	BlueBillz
"Back End"	2018	Lil Waldo	Where's Waldo?
"Gimme the Loot"	2018	YSM Swole, GetRichZay	Welcome to My World
"Posted in the Trap"	2018	DP Thablazer	Who Gone Stop Me
"Kool Aid"	2018	Rizzoo Rizzoo	Rario World
"Off the Boat"	2019	Slicc da Kidd	Life of a Finesser II (L.O.A.F II)
"Really Rich"	2019	CFN TrapGod	Trenchbaby 2
"In My Bag"	2019	King	Born 2 Die
"All I Ever Wanted Remixed"	2019	Moonie Music	From Me to You 2
"Sticks"	2019	Stunna 4 Vegas	Big 4x
"Ashley"	2019	Stunna 4 Vegas	Big 4x
"Hide the Money"	2019	Mir Fontaine	Who's Watching the Kids 2
"Stop Snitchin (Remix)"	2019	YG	4Real 4Real
"Under the Sun"	2019	Dreamville, J. Cole, Lute	Revenge of the Dreamers III
"Sauce"	2019	Bando Boy Shad	No Cap (Hosted by Kokethekendoll)
"Do It"	2019	Mak Sauce	Saturn Boy
"Tuesday"	2019	Blacc Zacc	Trappin Like Zacc
"Pink Toes"	2019	Quality Control, Offset, Gunna	Control the Streets, Volume 2
"Dispatch"	2019	Young Nudy, Pi'erre Bourne	Sli'merre
"100Ps"	2019	Shaquees, Tone Tone	Special Victims
"Protect da Brand"	2020	Moneybagg Yo	Time Served
"Do Dat"	2020	Stunna 4 Vegas, Lil Baby	Rich Youngin
"Stain"	2020	A Boogie wit da Hoodie	Artist 2.0
"Bang"	2020	Blacc Zacc	Carolina Narco
"Sick"	2020	Rich the Kid	Boss Man
"Thug of Spades"	2020	YoungBoy Never Broke Again	38 Baby 2
"Rich Criminals"	2020	NoCap	Steel Human
"Saving Money"	2020	Blac Youngsta	Fuck Everybody 3
"Monica Lewinsky, Election Year"	2020	Saint Jhn, A Boogie wit da Hoodie	While the World Was Burning
"Rich Off Words"	2020	Stunna 4 Vegas	Welcome to 4 Vegas
"Laughin"	2021	Rich the Kid	Lucky 7
"Know No Better"	2021	Justin Bieber	Justice (Triple Chucks Deluxe)
"Litty"	2021	Young Stoner Life, Young Thug	Slime Language 2 (Deluxe)
"Shop"	2021	Toosii	Thank You for Believing
"Party Lyfe"	2021	Polo G	Hall of Fame
"Jail, Pt. 2"	2021	Kanye West, Marilyn Manson	Donda
"Pop Pop"	2022	Snoop Dogg	BODR
"Wakanda"	2022	Anuel AA	LLNM2
"Nun"	2023	Trippie Redd	Mansion Musik
"Time Is Money"	2025	Joyner Lucas, J Balvin, Fireboy DML	ADHD 2
"In Ya City"	2025	Zeddy Will	TBA

== Music videos ==
=== As lead artist ===
List of music videos, showing year released and directors
Title	Year	Other artist(s)	Director(s)	Ref.
"No Compadre (Freestyle)"	2015	None	Travis Bravo	
"Best Friend (Freestyle)"	2015	None	Travis Bravo	
"Dab City"	2015	None	Travis Bravo	
"Dab City (Remix)"	2016	Skippa da Flippa	Travis Bravo	
"Look at Me Now"	2016	None	Travis Bravo	
"Light Show"	2016	None	Reel Goats	
"Safe Sex"	2016	None	Reel Goats	
"I Need You"	2016	None	Reel Goats	
"DaBaby (Intro)"	2016	None	Dorsey Wesley Jr.	
"Money"	2016	None	Reel Goats	
"Drug Money"	2016	None	Gwap God Films	
"On They Ass"	2016	None	Dorsey Wesley Jr.	
"Spend It (Remix)"	2017	None	Unknown	
"Caroline (Remix)"	2017	None	Unknown	
"Pull Up Music"	2017	None	TheFlyFamily	
"Switch"	2017	None	TheFlyFamily	
"S.O.E"	2017	Lil Shaq	TheFlyFamily	
"Mr. Clean"	2017	None	TheFlyFamily	
"No Hook"	2017	None	TheFlyFamily	
"Flip Phone"	2017	None	TheFlyFamily	
"Above the Rim"	2017	None	TheFlyFamily	
"Gorilla Glue"	2017	None	TheFlyFamily	
"Gucci Gang / Ice Tray (Freestyle)"	2018	None	TheFlyFamily	
"Above the Rim (Remix)"	2018	Money Man	TheFlyFamily	
"Laker"	2018	None	TheFlyFamily	
"Today – Intro"	2018	None	TheFlyFamily	
"Up the Street"	2018	None	TheFlyFamily	
"Keke / Zoom (Freestyle)"	2018	None	TheFlyFamily	
"No Love"	2018	None	Reel Goats	
"21"	2018	None	Savani Productions	
"Next Song"	2018	None	TheFlyFamily	
"No Tears"	2018	None	TheFlyFamily & ThePhotoFalcon	
"Blank Blank"	2018	None	Savani Productions	
"4X"	2018	Stunna 4 Vegas	Savani Productions	
"Walker Texas Ranger"	2019	None	Reel Goats	
"Leave Me Alone (Freestyle)"	2019	None	Medley Films	
"FuckYouTalmBout Freestyle"	2019	None	Medley Films	
"Beeper"	2019	None	Medley Films	
"Mini Van"	2019	BlocBoy JB	Reel Goats	
"Suge (Yea Yea)"	2019	None	Reel Goats	
"Baby on Baby Out Now Freestyle"	2019	None	Reel Goats	
"Goin Baby"	2019	None	Reel Goats	
"Baby Sitter"	2019	Offset	Reel Goats	
"Pony"	2019	None	Reel Goats	
"Carpet Burn"	2019	None	Reel Goats	
"Baby"	2019	Quality Control, Lil Baby	Daps	
"Panini (DaBaby Remix)"	2019	Lil Nas X	Emonee Larussa	
"Intro"	2019	None	Reel Goats	
"Vibez"	2019	None	Reel Goats	
"Off da Rip"	2019	None	Reel Goats	
"Bop"	2019	None	Reel Goats	
"Shut Up"	2020	None	Reel Goats	
"Oprah's Bank Account"	2020	Lil Yachty, Drake	Director X	
"Find My Way"	2020	None	Reel Goats	
"Jump"	2020	YoungBoy Never Broke Again	Reel Goats	
"Can't Stop"	2020	None	Reel Goats	
"Rockstar"	2020	Roddy Ricch	Reel Goats	
"No Dribble"	2020	Stunna 4 Vegas	Reel Goats	
"Peep Hole"	2020	None	Reel Goats	
"Pick Up"	2020	Quavo	Reel Goats	
"Practice"	2020	None	Gemini Vision	
"Blind"	2020	Young Thug	Motion Family	
"Gucci Peacoat"	2020	None	Gemini Vision	
"More Money More Problems"	2020	None	Gemini Vision	
"Masterpiece"	2021	None	Gemini Vision	
"Throat Baby (Go Baby) (Remix)"	2021	BRS Kash, City Girls	Edgar Esteves, Jon Primo	
"Beat Box (Remix)"	2021	None	Gemini Visions	
"Ball If I Want To"	2021	None	DaBaby	
"Red Light Green Light"	2021	None	DaBaby	
"Giving What It's Supposed to Give"	2021	None	DaBaby	
"Shake Sumn"	2023	None	Reel Goats	

=== As featured artist ===
List of music videos, showing year released and directors
Title	Year	Other artist(s)	Director(s)	Ref.
"Struggle Baby"	2017	Lil Jr., Just Raven	PJ Manderville	
"Litty City"	2017	Zac Keelo	Connor Milligan	
"The Dealer"	2017	Deniro Farrar	TheFlyFamily, Reel Goats	
"Plug Best Friend"	2017	CFN TrapGod	Illy Rock	
"Killa Cam"	2017	Def Smove	Mark Lee	
"I Shoulda Told Ya"	2018	Skully	TheFlyFamily	
"Back End"	2018	Waldo	TheFlyFamily	
"Blue Strips"	2018	Gabby Dinero	TheFlyFamily	
"Animal"	2018	Stunna 4 Vegas	Medley Films	
"Sing"	2018	Shawn Scrilla	Savani Productions	
"Fan Freestyle"	2018	Stunna 4 Vegas	Mello Vision	
"Juice"	2018	LoudPack Leaf	Medley Films	
"On the Run"	2019	G Step	TheFlyFamily	
"No Cap Zone"	2019	Succeed Phlyguy, Stunna 4 Vegas	Savani Productions	
"Kool Aid"	2019	Rizzoo Rizzoo	OG Visions	
"Billion Dollar Baby Freestyle"	2019	Stunna 4 Vegas	Reel Goats	
"Scared to Book Me"	2019	BaeBae Savo	J Taylor	
"Look at God"	2019	Garcia Vega	The DirectorZ	
"Stop Snitchin (Remix)"	2019	YG	Cole Bennett	
"Ashley"	2019	Stunna 4 Vegas	Reel Goats	
"Do It"	2019	Mak Sauce	Class Clown Films	
"How They Gon Eat"	2019	Jerry White	TheFlyFamily	
"Under the Sun"	2019	Dreamville, J. Cole, Lute	Scott Lazer, Aisultan Seitov, David Peters, and Chad Tennies	
"Hot Shower"	2019	Chance the Rapper, MadeinTYO	Reel Goats	
"Boss Friends"	2019	Plies	Plies, Legit Looks	
"Heartless"	2019	Viic Flair	Salz Filmz, NooRatchets	
"Suboxone"	2019	Munk, Shakewell	MeatCanyon	
"My Oh My"	2020	Camila Cabello	Dave Meyers	
"Do Dat"	2020	Stunna 4 Vegas, Lil Baby	Reel Goats	
"Obama"	2020	Blueface	Aaron Green	
"Levi High"	2020	DaniLeigh	Kat Webber	
"Hello"	2020	SKZIY	Unknown	
"In & Out"	2020	YHN Balla	Valley Vision	
"Stuntin' on You"	2020	Tyla Yaweh	Chris Villa	
"Protect da Brand"	2020	Moneybagg Yo	Guerilla Mike Mihail	
"Whats Poppin (Remix)"	2020	Jack Harlow, Tory Lanez, Lil Wayne	Eif Rivera	
"Molly (Remix)"	2020	Foogiano	iNightlyfe	
"Levitating"	2020	Dua Lipa	Warren Fu	
"Bang"	2020	Blacc Zacc	20K Visuals	
"Said Sum (Remix)"	2020	Moneybagg Yo, City Girls	BenMarc	
"Saving Money"	2020	Blac Youngsta	GT Films	
"Monica Lewinsky, Election Year"	2020	Saint Jhn, A Boogie wit da Hoodie	Taylor Foor	
"Tap In (Remix)"	2020	Saweetie, Post Malone, Jack Harlow	KDC Visions	
"Coco"	2020	24kGoldn	Cole Bennett	
"Cry Baby"	2021	Megan Thee Stallion	Colin Tilley	
"Shop"	2021	Toosii	Edgar Esteves	
"I Did It"	2021	DJ Khaled, Post Malone, Megan Thee Stallion, Lil Baby	Dave Meyers	
"Get Fly"	2021	OhGeesy	Austin Simkins	
"Girl from Rio (Remix)"	2021	Anitta	Giovanni Bianco	
"Drop"	2021	Yo Gotti	Arrad	
"Skat"	2021	Tory Lanez	Christian Breslauer	
"Party Lyfe"	2021	Polo G	Arrad	
"Demon"	2021	Rich Dunk	DaBaby	
