= Shut Up (DaBaby song) =

2020 single by DaBaby

Single by DaBaby
- Released: February 6, 2020
- Genre: Hip hop; trap
- Length: 2:52
- Label: Interscope
- Songwriters: Jonathan Kirk; De'Juane Dunwood
- Producer: DJ Kid

DaBaby singles chronology
"My Oh My" (2020)	"Shut Up" (2020)	"Obama" (2020)

Music video
- "Shut Up" on YouTube

"Shut Up" (stylized in all-caps) is a song by American rapper DaBaby, released as a single on February 6, 2020.

== Background ==
The song talks about DaBaby's haters talking bad about him, which is resulting in him telling them to shut up in the song. It brings up his lawsuits as well. He brings up the fact where he was seen "assaulting" a hotel worker after recording him with his two-year-old daughter without their permission, even after DaBaby denied it and respectfully explained to him that it would compromise the safety of his child.

The song is produced by DJ K.i.D, who also produced DaBaby's "Intro". A line in the first verse makes a reference to American rapper Kevin Gates, who was featured on DaBaby's "Pop Star" from his second studio album, Kirk (2019).

== Release ==
Although the song was released on February 6, 2020, on DaBaby's YouTube channel, the track was officially uploaded to all streaming services on February 12, 2020, (Note: This can be verified by looking at the cached date when doing a Google search with a date range.) but was listed under the release date as being released on February 6, 2020.

== Critical reception ==
Mitch Findlay of HotNewHipHop said that the track was a "banger", and that DaBaby "goes off".

== Music video ==
The music video was released on February 6, 2020. It shows DaBaby hanging out on Super Bowl weekend for Super Bowl LIV, and features clips with American rappers Diddy and Kanye West "to help him celebrate DaBaby's success. The video, directed by Reel Goats, was shot in Miami, Florida, where Super Bowl LIV, the 54th Super Bowl, was played by the Kansas City Chiefs and San Francisco 49ers.
