= Blind (DaBaby song) =

Single by DaBaby featuring Young Thug

Single by DaBaby featuring Young Thug

from the album Blame It on Baby (Deluxe)
- Released: September 1, 2020
- Length: 2:33
- Label: Interscope; South Coast
- Songwriters: Jonathan Kirk; Jeffery Williams; Wesley Glass; Lukasz Gottwald
- Producers: Wheezy; Dr. Luke

DaBaby singles chronology
"Tap In (Remix)" (2020)	"Blind" (2020)	"Said Sum (Remix)" (2020)

Young Thug singles chronology
"Dollaz on My Head" (2020)	"Blind" (2020)	"Ring" (2020)

Music video
- "Blind" on YouTube

"Blind" (stylized in all caps) is a song by American rapper DaBaby, featuring vocals from fellow American rapper Young Thug. It was sent to rhythmic contemporary radio as the third single from the deluxe edition of his third studio album, Blame It On Baby, and its fifth and final overall single, on September 1, 2020. The two artists wrote the song along with its producers Wheezy and Dr. Luke.

== Background and composition ==
The guitar-driven track finds DaBaby singing a bit, different from his usual rapping flow and similar to Young Thug's singing at the second half of the song. The rappers reflect on their life in the streets before fame.

== Music video ==
The official music video for the song was released on November 16, 2020. Directed by Motion Family, it begins with a tribute to DaBaby's older brother Glenn Johnson, who died earlier in the month. DaBaby invites his grandfather (played by himself) to spend the day with him and Young Thug at his video shoot as a treat for his 90th birthday. The senior follows the artists as they entertain themselves in the filming and sometimes disrupts it.

== Live performances ==
DaBaby performed the song at the MTV Video Music Awards on August 30, 2020, along with his songs from the album, "Rockstar" and "Peep Hole", as a medley of all three.

== Charts ==
Chart (2020)	Peak position
Canada Hot 100 (Billboard)	82
New Zealand Hot Singles (RMNZ)	9
US Billboard Hot 100	74
US Hot R&B/Hip-Hop Songs (Billboard)	30
US Rhythmic Airplay (Billboard)	6

== Certifications ==
Certifications for Blind
Region	Certification	Certified units/sales
New Zealand (RMNZ)	Gold	15,000^{‡}
United States (RIAA)	Gold	500,000^{‡}
^{‡} Sales+streaming figures based on certification alone.
