= Lonely (DaBaby and Lil Wayne song) =

2021 single by DaBaby and Lil Wayne

Single by DaBaby and Lil Wayne

from the album Baby on Baby 2 (intended)
- Released: September 9, 2021
- Length: 2:35
- Label: South Coast Music Group; Interscope
- Songwriter(s): Jonathan Kirk; Dwayne Carter, Jr.; De'Juane Dunwood; Benjamin Lasnier; Lasse Kramhøft
- Producer(s): DJ K.i.D; Lasnier; Pilfinger

DaBaby singles chronology
"Demon" (2021)	"Lonely" (2021)	"Yeah B*tch" (2021)

Lil Wayne singles chronology
"Lose" (2021)	"Lonely" (2021)	"Wockesha (Remix)" (2021)

Music video
- "Lonely" on YouTube

"Lonely" is a song by American rappers DaBaby and Lil Wayne. It was released through South Coast Music Group and Interscope Records originally intended as the third single from DaBaby's fourth studio album Baby on Baby 2. It was written alongside producers DJ K.i.D, Benjamin Lasnier, and Pilfinger.

== Credits and personnel ==
Credits adapted from Tidal.

- DaBaby – vocals, songwriting
- Lil Wayne – vocals, songwriting
- DJ K.i.D – production, songwriting, recording, studio personnel
- Benjamin Lasnier – production, songwriting
- Pilfinger – production, songwriting
- Derek "MixedByAli" Ali – mixing, studio personnel
- Cyrus "Nois" Taghipour – mixing, studio personnel
- Curtis "Sircut" Bye – assistant mixing, studio personnel
- Nicolas De Porcel – mastering, studio personnel

== Charts ==
Chart performance for "Lonely"
Chart (2021)	Peak position
Canada (Canadian Hot 100)	86
Global 200 (Billboard)	125
New Zealand Hot Singles (RMNZ)	26
US Billboard Hot 100	63
US Hot R&B/Hip-Hop Songs (Billboard)	28
