= Baby talk (disambiguation) =

Baby talk is a simplified form of language used by adults when speaking to babies.

Baby talk may also refer to:

== Speech of babies ==
- Babbling, a stage where an infant utters sounds of language, but not yet any recognizable words
- Baby language, the language of babies
- Infantile speech, a speech disorder

== Media and entertainment ==
- Babytalk (magazine), an American magazine targeted at new parents
- Baby Talk (TV series), a 1991 American sitcom
- "Baby Talk" (Jan and Dean song), 1959
- "Baby Talk" (Alisha song), 1985
- "Baby Talk" (George and Mildred), a 1976 television episode
- "Baby Talk" (How I Met Your Mother), a 2010 television episode
- "Baby Talk" (My Hero), a 2002 television episode
- Baby Talk, a series of five mixtapes from DaBaby released between 2017 and 2018, see his mixtapes discography
