= Find My Way =

Find My Way may refer to:

- Find My Way (DaBaby song), 2020
- Find My Way (Paul McCartney song), 2020
