= My Brother's Keeper (Long Live G) =

- DaBaby (left) and his late older brother, Glenn Johnson (right) as babies

EP by DaBaby
- Released: November 20, 2020
- Length: 17:52
- Label: Interscope; South Coast
- Producer: Bankroll Got It; Diego Ave; DJ K.i.D; Eliot Bohr; JetsonMade; Kevin Ave; Mantiz; P-Dub; SethInTheKitchen; Wizzle

DaBaby chronology
| Blame It on Baby (2020) | My Brother's Keeper (Long Live G) (2020) | Back on My Baby Jesus Sh!t Again (2021) |

Professional ratings
Review scores
| Source | Rating |
|---|---|
| AllMusic | 4/5 stars |

My Brother's Keeper (Long Live G) is the first extended play by American rapper DaBaby. It was released through Interscope Records and South Coast on November 20, 2020. The EP features guest appearances from Meek Mill, NoCap, Polo G, and Toosii. It consists of seven tracks and was released as a tribute to DaBaby's older brother, Glenn Johnson, who died from suicide, on November 3, 2020.

== Background ==
On November 3, 2020, DaBaby's older brother, Glenn Johnson, died at the age of thirty-four, from committing suicide. He had died from a self-inflicted gunshot wound. He had four kids, one son and three daughters. The following day, the rapper, via social media, reflected and shared lyrics from a few lines of one of his previous tracks, titled "Intro" (2019), which said "My brother be thinkin' that we don't love him and let him struggle like we ain't family / Like I won't give up all I got to see you happy, nigga".

=== Music videos ===
The official music video for "Gucci Peacoat" was premiered along with the EP, followed by the video for "More Money More Problems" three days later, on November 23.

== Track listing ==
Credits adapted from ASCAP.

| No. | Title | Writer(s) | Producer(s) | Length |
|---|---|---|---|---|
| 1. | "Brother's Keeper" | Jonathan Kirk; De'Juane Dunwood; Eliot Bohr | DJ K.i.D; Bohr | 2:06 |
| 2. | "8 Figures" (featuring Meek Mill) | Kirk; Robert Williams; Dunwood; Luis Witkiewitz | DJ K.i.D; Wizzle | 2:58 |
| 3. | "Shanyah" | Kirk; Dunwood | DJ K.i.D | 2:40 |
| 4. | "Gucci Peacoat" | Kirk; Dunwood; Clayton Penrose-Whitmore | DJ K.i.D; P-Dub | 2:52 |
| 5. | "Handgun" (featuring NoCap and Polo G) | Kirk; Kobe Crawford; Taurus Bartlett; Diego Avendano; Joel Banks; Taylor Banks | Diego Ave; Bankroll Got It | 2:34 |
| 6. | "Bidness" (featuring Toosii) | Kirk; Nau'Jour Grainger; Tahj Morgan; Jay McCorkle | JetsonMade; Mantiz | 3:03 |
| 7. | "More Money More Problems" | Kirk; Ross Portaro IV | SethInTheKitchen | 2:59 |
| Total length: | | | | 17:52 |

Notes

- "Gucci Peacoat" features a spoken conversation between DaBaby and his late brother Glenn Johnson.

== Charts ==
Chart performance for My Brother's Keeper (Long Live G)
| Chart (2020) | Peak position |
|---|---|
| US Billboard 200 | 40 |
| US Top R&B/Hip-Hop Albums (Billboard) | 19 |
| US Top Rap Albums (Billboard) | 17 |
