= Jump (DaBaby song) =

2020 song by DaBaby featuring YoungBoy Never Broke Again

Song by DaBaby featuring YoungBoy Never Broke Again

from the album Blame It on Baby
- Released: April 17, 2020
- Genre: Trap
- Length: 3:32
- Label: South Coast Music Group; Interscope
- Songwriters: Jonathan Kirk; Kentrell Gaulden; Dejuane Dunwood; Rocco Valdes
- Producers: Rocco Did It Again!; DJ K.i.D

Music video
- "Jump" on YouTube

"Jump" is a song by American rapper DaBaby featuring fellow American rapper YoungBoy Never Broke Again, released on April 17, 2020, as the eighth track from DaBaby's third studio album, Blame It on Baby. The bouncy trap beat sees DaBaby and YoungBoy going back and forth about their success.

== Composition ==
The song is built around a heavy baseline which builds the melody for both DaBaby and YoungBoy. Rocco Did It Again! and DJ K.i.D use squeaky and electronic instrumentals to enhance the song's trap beat.

== Critical reception ==
HipHopDX's Scott Glaysher noted that the song "isn't easy on the ears" and "sounds like a chaotic carnival of bad rhymes and even worse ad-libs." Listing it as one of the most forward on the album, Pitchfork's Dani Blum notes that the track is "familiarly propulsive," however it shows "YoungBoy Never Broke Again doing his best DaBaby impression."

== Music video ==
The song's official music video - released on side of the audio - sees DaBaby and YoungBoy Never Broke Again taking influence from the COVID-19 pandemic as Baby and YB are seen heavily cleaning and sanitizing the house in which the video is recorded in. The Reel Goats-directed video sees the two artists practicing social distancing while dancing and rapping the tune, "jump[ing]" around.

== Charts ==
Chart (2020)	Peak position
Canada (Canadian Hot 100)	62
Irish Singles Chart (IRE)	77
New Zealand Hot Singles (RMNZ)	12
US Billboard Hot 100	17
US Hot R&B/Hip-Hop Songs (Billboard)	9

== Certifications ==
Region	Certification	Certified units/sales
United States (RIAA)	Platinum	1,000,000^{‡}
^{‡} Sales+streaming figures based on certification alone.
