= Find My Way (DaBaby song) =

2020 single by DaBaby

Single by DaBaby

from the album Blame It on Baby
- Released: April 1, 2020
- Length: 2:19
- Label: Interscope; South Coast Music Group
- Songwriters: Jonathan Kirk; De'Juane Dunwood
- Producer: DJ Kid

DaBaby singles chronology
"Vibez" (2020)	"Find My Way" (2020)	"Rockstar" (2020)

Music video
- "Find My Way" on YouTube

"Find My Way" (stylized in all caps) is a song by American rapper DaBaby, released as the lead single from his third studio album Blame It On Baby on April 1, 2020.

== Composition ==
The song is produced by DJ K.i.D, who also produced DaBaby's "Intro" and "Shut Up". Lyrically, it deals with DaBaby finding the way to his career. DaBaby switches the flow and cadence on the song and sings on the chorus, while rapping on the two verses.

The guitar riff was sampled from Prime Loops' "Melodic Guitar Hooks 95amin Acoustic Groovy 2" from the sample pack "Melodic Guitar Hooks."

== Promotion ==
DaBaby teased the song for the first time with a video posted on Instagram on March 25, 2020. He later posted an acoustic video with guitarist Einer Bankz on March 30. The track was released with the music video on April 1, 2020.

=== Dating rumors ===
On March 30, 2020, B. Simone, who starred in the music video, shared a photo of DaBaby grabbing her butt, with the caption "❤️ 🔐". This sparked dating rumors between the two. However, DaBaby debunked these rumors with the announcement of the song and its accompanying music video.

== Music video ==
The music video, directed by Reel Goats, was released on April 1, 2020, and co-stars Instagram influencer B. Simone. The concept bears similarities to the story of Bonnie and Clyde. It shows DaBaby with B. Simone in a car, with flashbacks of the pair shooting people. They then check into in a hotel. Other patrons soon tell the hotel about them and the hotel staff knocks on DaBaby and Simone's hotel door and orders them to leave immediately saying they have two minutes to do so. DaBaby later talks from inside and uses obscene language. After, DaBaby and Simone do not talk, but Simone finds the gun and gives it to DaBaby. The hotel staff start shooting down the room to get in and DaBaby, who is hidden with Simone, begins returning fire.

=== Alternate ending ===
DaBaby shared an alternate ending to the music video on April 8, 2020, with the caption "Raise ya hand for the alternate ending ? 🙋🏾‍♂️". Reasoning for B. Simone being on the video was being on Wild 'n Out with being a guest star and captain of the New School at the time,

== Critical reception ==
The track received generally positive reviews. Bianca Gracie of Billboard called the track "melodic". Mitch Findlay of HotNewHipHop was extremely positive about the song, calling it his "most stylistically daring track in a minute", saying it was "certainly a promising direction for the rapper's upcoming third studio album". He also said the track "has all the making of a full-fledged hit", and called the delivery "passionate" and "confident", and the production "seductive yet dangerous".

== Commercial performance ==
"Find My Way" charted in the UK, Australia, New Zealand, and at number 22 on the US Billboard Hot 100.

== Charts ==
Chart performance for "Find My Way"
Chart (2020)	Peak position
Australia (ARIA)	47
Canada Hot 100 (Billboard)	33
Ireland (IRMA)	25
Lithuania (AGATA)	41
New Zealand Hot Singles (RMNZ)	2
Portugal (AFP)	72
Sweden Heatseeker (Sverigetopplistan)	1
Switzerland (Schweizer Hitparade)	68
UK Singles (Official Charts)	46
US Billboard Hot 100	22
US Hot R&B/Hip-Hop Songs (Billboard)	12

== Certifications ==
Certifications and sales for "Find My Way"
Region	Certification	Certified units/sales
United States (RIAA)	Platinum	1,000,000^{‡}
^{‡} Sales+streaming figures based on certification alone.
