= Back on My Baby Jesus Sh!t Again =

EP by DaBaby
- Released: November 12, 2021
- Length: 12:14
- Label: Interscope; South Coast
- Producer: Busco; CashMoneyAP; Charlie Heat; Dez Wright; Glacier; London on da Track; OG Parker; Pilgrim; Stoopid Lou; Tommy Parker; UzoHarbor; Wolf

DaBaby chronology
My Brother's Keeper (Long Live G) (2020)	Back on My Baby Jesus Sh!t Again (2021)	Better than You (2022)

Professional ratings
Review scores
Source	Rating
AllMusic	3.5/5 stars

Back on My Baby Jesus Sh!t Again is the second extended play by American rapper DaBaby. It was released through Interscope Records and South Coast on November 12, 2021. The EP features guest appearances from Kodak Black and 21 Savage. It serves as the sequel to DaBaby's tenth mixtape, Back on My Baby Jesus Sh!t (2017).

== Background ==
DaBaby announced the EP and its artwork on November 5, 2021. The EP sees DaBaby "rapping in his purest form". Although the EP did not hit the forefront of the Apple Music charts, American record producer Timbaland praised it, saying it "is hard".

== Track listing ==
Back on My Baby Jesus Sh!t Again track listing
No.	Title	Writer(s)	Producer(s)	Length
1.	"Draws"	Jonathan Kirk; Uzoma Harbor; Benjamin Abraham	UzoHarbor; Wolf	1:03
2.	"5 for a Dub"	Kirk; Dwayne Oats	Glacier	1:56
3.	"Levels" (featuring Kodak Black)	Kirk; Bill Kapri; Alex Petit; Dylan Cleary-Krell; Moritz Leppers	CashMoneyAP; Dez Wright; Stoopid Lou	2:36
4.	"Roof"	Kirk; London Holmes; Joshua Parker	London on da Track; OG Parker	1:34
5.	"Look Like Sumn"	Kirk; Ernest Brown III; Matthew Buscarino	Charlie Heat; Busco	1:55
6.	"Sticked Up" (featuring 21 Savage)	Kirk; Shayaa Abraham-Joseph; Harbor; Thomas Lumpkins; Beck Norling	UzoHarbor; Tommy Parker; Pilgrim	3:06
Total length:				12:14

== Charts ==
Chart performance for Back on My Baby Jesus Sh!t Again
Chart (2021)	Peak position
US Billboard 200	44
US Top R&B/Hip-Hop Albums (Billboard)	19
