= Said Sum =

2020 single by Moneybagg Yo

Single by Moneybagg Yo

from the album Code Red
- Released: June 30, 2020
- Genre: Trap
- Length: 2:35
- Label: Interscope; N-Less
- Songwriters: Demario White, Jr.; Christopher Pearson
- Producer: TurnMeUpYC

Moneybagg Yo singles chronology
| "Hollup" (2020) | "Said Sum" (2020) | "Time Today" (2021) |

Music video
- "Said Sum" on YouTube

"Said Sum" is a song by American rapper Moneybagg Yo, released on June 30, 2020. It serves as the lead single from Moneybagg Yo’s collaborative mixtape with Blac Youngsta, Code Red. It was produced by frequent Moneybagg producer, TurnMeUpYC. The track is aimed at Moneybagg Yo's detractors.

== Background and composition ==
Moneybagg Yo first previewed the track in an Instagram post on June 29, 2020. As noted by Revolt's Jon Powell, the song sees Moneybagg "taking shots at an adversary". He subliminally addresses people who have lots to say, but yet say nothing significant.

== Critical reception ==
Revolt's Jon Powell called it a "hard-hitting" cut.

== Music video ==
The BenMarc-directed video was released alongside the song, and is set inside a barbershop and nail salon, where Moneybagg gets pampered. He is also seen in studio, playing a violin, and showing off his wealth in the backseat of a car. On July 6, 2020, a behind the scenes video was released. On October 19, 2020, the music video for the remix was released. It features Moneybagg alongside City Girls and DaBaby. The original music video has over 110 million views, while the remix has over 60 million views as of March 2022.

== Remix ==
A remix of the song featuring City Girls and DaBaby, was released on September 17, 2020. It is also included on Code Red, along with the original version.

== Charts ==
The song originally peaked at 24 on the Billboard Hot 100 before peaking at 17 with a boost from the remix on the week of October 31.

=== Weekly charts ===
| Chart (2020–2021) | Peak position |
|---|---|
| Canada Hot 100 (Billboard) | 88 |
| US Billboard Hot 100 | 17 |
| US Hot R&B/Hip-Hop Songs (Billboard) | 8 |
| US Hot Rap Songs (Billboard) | 7 |
| US Rhythmic Airplay (Billboard) | 15 |
| US Rolling Stone Top 100 | 27 |

=== Year-end charts ===
| Chart (2020) | Position |
|---|---|
| US Billboard Hot 100 | 98 |
| US Hot R&B/Hip-Hop Songs (Billboard) | 48 |

| Chart (2021) | Position |
|---|---|
| US Hot R&B/Hip-Hop Songs (Billboard) | 75 |

== Certifications ==
| Region | Certification | Certified units/sales |
|---|---|---|
| New Zealand (RMNZ) | Gold | 15,000^{‡} |
| United States (RIAA) | 5× Platinum | 5,000,000^{‡} |
^{‡} Sales+streaming figures based on certification alone.
