= Baby on Baby 2 =

Studio album by DaBaby
- Released: September 23, 2022
- Length: 30:49
- Labels: South Coast; Interscope
- Producers: 1st Class; 800kay; Ambezza; ATL Jacob; Ben10k; Charlie Heat; CV; DrxftGod; Deuces RK; Fate F250; J. Stacks; Jack Rochon; Jee; jetsonmade; LMC; Lil Ty; Louis Yung; Neeko; Otxhello; Perx; Pooh Beatz; Sean da Firzt; Sim; Twoprxducers; Xjay; Zoo

DaBaby chronology
Better than You (2022)	Baby on Baby 2 (2022)	How TF Is This a Mixtape? (2024)

Baby on Baby 2 is the fourth studio album by American rapper DaBaby. It was released through Interscope Records and South Coast Music Group on September 23, 2022. The album features a sole guest appearance from fellow North Carolinian, singer Anthony Hamilton. It serves as a sequel to DaBaby's debut studio album, Baby on Baby (2019).

== Critical reception ==
Professional ratings
Review scores
Source	Rating
AllMusic	2/5 stars

AllMusic criticized that the material on Baby on Baby 2 "begins to feel one-dimensional and interchangeable." and also concluded "As ever, the songs here are energetic and fun, but ultimately feel a little disposable, with DaBaby's work becoming more and more like a particular and brawny mood than any specific creative statement."

== Background and promotion ==
In July 2022, DaBaby was interviewed by Canadian-American YouTube channel Nelk's Full Send Podcast, in which he revealed the title of the album and announced an initial release for the beginning of the next month, which did not happen for unknown reasons. On September 22, 2022, he shared its cover art and release date for the following day.

== Reception ==
The album received generally negative reviews, with critics citing a lack of originality, repetitive flows, and a general sense of the album feeling forced and desperate. Many reviews pointed to a decline in quality compared to his previous work, with some even calling it a "train wreck". Critics frequently noted that the album sounded too similar to his previous work, with little to no variation in his signature flow and beat selection. Songs were described as blending together, with a lack of nuance or distinctiveness. Several reviews highlighted the weak songwriting and repetitive hooks, with some songs being described as "bare bones" and lacking melody. Many reviewers felt that DaBaby was trying too hard to recapture past success, leading to an album that felt forced and lacking in genuine creativity.

== Commercial performance ==
The album was projected to earn significantly less units in its first week than DaBaby's previous album Blame It on Baby (2020), with both DaBaby himself and rapper Meek Mill claiming that DaBaby had been "blackballed". His previous album had nine guest appearances on the original version, and four additional guest appearances on the deluxe edition, while Baby on Baby 2 had only one guest appearance.

Baby on Baby 2 debuted at number 34 on the US Billboard 200 chart with approximately 17,000 album equivalent units.

== Track listing ==
Baby on Baby 2 track listing
No.	Title	Writer(s)	Producer(s)	Length
1.	"Go Again (Intro)"	Jonathan Kirk; Anthony Mosley; Adam Gamble; Michael Ferrell	Sean da Firzt; Kayothewizard; Fate F250	2:06
2.	"Drop Dat Diss"	Kirk; Tahj Morgan; Caleb Shannon; Ivan Pitesa	jetsonmade; 800kay; Zoo	1:23
3.	"Boogeyman"	Kirk; Morgan; Joseph Langston; Tyrese McGriff	jetsonmade; Jee; Lil Ty	2:06
4.	"Socks"	Kirk; Morgan; Darryl Clemons	jetsonmade; Pooh Beatz	2:51
5.	"No Condom"	Kirk; Morgan; Andre Harp	jetsonmade; Xjay; CV; Deuces RK	1:43
6.	"Summa Dat"	Kirk; Morgan; Shannon; Pitesa	jetsonmade; 800kay; Zoo	1:23
7.	"Still"	Kirk; Morgan; McGriff; Khaleel Griffin; Marcus Williams	jetsonmade; Lil Ty; 1st Class; DrxftGod	2:29
8.	"Act That Hard"	Kirk; Mathias Liyew; Benjamin Wilson; Louis Yung	Ambezza; Ben10k; Yung	2:03
9.	"Keep It Cute"	Kirk; Justus Stackhouse	J. Stacks	2:16
10.	"One Man Army"	Kirk; Morgan; Shannon; Robert McKenzie	jetsonmade; 800kay; Perx	2:13
11.	"Call of Duty"	Kirk; Morgan; Liam McAlister; Dondre Moore; Jake Martin; Paul Gachie	jetsonmade; LMC; Neeko; Twoprxducers	1:15
12.	"That's Why I Creep"	Kirk; Liyew; Yung; Othello Houston	Ambezza; Yung; Otxhello	3:19
13.	"Blank" (featuring Anthony Hamilton)	Kirk; Anthony Hamilton; Ernest Brown III; Jack Rochon; Ramon Montgomery	Charlie Heat; Rochon	3:19
14.	"Don't Let Em Lie"	Kirk; Jacob Canady; Simarpreet Bahia	ATL Jacob; Sim	2:17
Total length:				30:49

Notes

- ^{^[a]} signifies a co-producer

== Charts ==
Chart performance for Baby on Baby 2
Chart (2022)	Peak position
US Billboard 200	34
US Top R&B/Hip-Hop Albums (Billboard)	21
