= Blame It on Baby =

Studio album by DaBaby
- Released: April 17, 2020
- Genres: Hip hop; trap
- Length: 33:40
- Labels: South Coast; Interscope
- Producers: Dr Luke; DJ K.i.D; London on da Track; Foreign Teck; Jae Green; Jasper Harris; Jayston; JetsonMade; JW Lucas; L.N.K; LosTheProducer; Mario Petersen; MVABeats; Nils; Outtatown; Rocco Did It Again!; SethInTheKitchen; Starboy; Tom French; Wheezy

DaBaby chronology
Kirk (2019)	Blame It on Baby (2020)	My Brother's Keeper (Long Live G) (2020)

Deluxe edition cover

Singles from Blame It on Baby
- 1. "Find My Way" Released: April 1, 2020; 2. "Rockstar" Released: April 17, 2020; 3. "No Dribble" Released: July 27, 2020; 4. "Peep Hole" Released: August 3, 2020; 5. "Blind" Released: September 1, 2020

Blame It on Baby (stylized in all caps) is the third studio album by American rapper DaBaby. The album was released on April 17, 2020, by Interscope Records and South Coast Music Group. The album features guest appearances from Quavo from the hip-hop trio Migos, Future, JetsonMade, Roddy Ricch, YoungBoy Never Broke Again, A Boogie wit da Hoodie, London on da Track, Ashanti, and Megan Thee Stallion. The deluxe edition was released with ten bonus tracks on August 4, 2020. It features additional guest appearances from Young Thug, Stunna 4 Vegas, Gunna, and Rich Dunk.

The album is supported by the singles "Find My Way", released on April 1, 2020, and "Rockstar", featuring Roddy Ricch, released on April 24, 2020. The latter reached number one on the US Billboard Hot 100, with its Black Lives Matter (BLM) remix being included on the deluxe edition. The album received generally positive reviews from music critics.

== Background ==
The project is DaBaby's third studio album. He first announced the album on April 13, 2020, with a post on Twitter, and revealed the cover art and release date on April 14.

== Singles ==
"Find My Way" was released as the album's lead single on April 1, 2020, along with a music video. It co-stars Instagram influencer B. Simone. The concept bears similarities to the story of Bonnie and Clyde. It shows DaBaby with B. Simone in a car, with flashbacks of the pair shooting people. They then check into in a hotel. Other patrons soon tell the hotel about them and the hotel staff knocks on DaBaby and Simone's hotel door and orders them to leave immediately saying they have two minutes to do so. DaBaby later talks from inside and uses obscene language. After, DaBaby and Simone do not talk, but Simone finds the gun and gives it to DaBaby. The hotel staff start shooting down the room to get in and DaBaby, who is hidden with Simone, begins returning fire. The music video was filmed in the desert in California. DaBaby shared an alternate ending to the music video on April 8, 2020, with the caption "Raise ya hand for the alternate ending ?".

"Rockstar", featuring American rapper Roddy Ricch, was released as the album's second single on June 12, 2020, since DaBaby released a BLM (Black Lives Matter) remix on that day of the song featuring an extra verse from him before the rest of the song, regarding the George Floyd protests that started in May 2020, and his own experience with police abuse. The music video was released on June 26, 2020, starring the two rappers hunting zombies on an open field. "Rockstar" has spent seven non-consecutive weeks at number one on the US Billboard Hot 100. The song also topped the charts in Australia, Canada, Denmark, New Zealand, Ireland, Switzerland and the United Kingdom, and peaked within the top ten of the charts in Germany, the Netherlands, Norway, Italy, Portugal and Sweden.

A new song, "No Dribble" featuring DaBaby's artist Stunna 4 Vegas was released alongside a video as the album's third single on July 27, 2020. On August 3, 2020, DaBaby released another new song and video, "Peep Hole", as the fourth single, a day prior to the album's deluxe release.

"Blind", featuring Young Thug, was sent to rhythmic contemporary radio as the second radio single, following "Rockstar", and the fifth overall single from the album.

== Composition and recording ==
According to DaBaby's producer, engineer and DJ, DJ K.i.D, DaBaby recorded many of his verses for the album on the road, while touring, and in home studios. DJ K.i.D. is credited on six of the 13 tracks on Blame It on Baby. The album incorporates work from several producers who answered DJ K.i.D.'s call for beats on Instagram. The DJ recalled the great response he received: "I sent out that message online, and 5,000 people hit me [...] My DMs are on smash". The "fizzy and forceful" beat for "Jump", for instance, came from producer Rocco Did It Again!, who reached out to K.i.D. because he admired "Intro", a song from DaBaby's previous album Kirk. K.i.D. explained the production behind the song: "Rocco had a looped hi-hat on there that I cleaned up a little bit. The 808 he had was sounding a little weird on the speakers, so I added mine". Similarly, two German musicians, Mario Petersen and L.N.K., are responsible for the skeleton beat of "Drop". The inspiration for the beat came from the producers wanting "to make something R&B-sounding, so we were working with a guitar loop and a vocal chop". L.N.K. further elaborated, "We thought, 'Who could we send it to?' Summer Walker or Roddy Ricch came up. So we sent it to London [on da Track], because we knew he works with those people". London, instead, sent the song to DaBaby, and it ended up becoming a "shimmering, melancholy" collaboration with A Boogie wit da Hoodie. Marcello Pagin, who manages Petersen and L.N.K. explained the concept of sharing instrumentals: "For a lot of U.S. producers, getting sounds and sample ideas is a source of inspiration to get a lot of records done". Another German musician, Nils Noehden, sent a "chirpy" riff to producer Wheezy who eventually turned it into "Talk About It". The production work on "Rockstar", "the immediate fan-favorite from Blame It on Baby", was solely helmed by SethInTheKitchen, a beatmaker acquainted with DaBaby since the rapper was a local talent in Charlotte, North Carolina. "Rockstar" merges "delicate acoustic guitar with a thundering bass line and a deft verse from Roddy Ricch". The tracks "Sad Shit" and "Drop" sees DaBaby singing – an apparent response at cynic's' insistence on DaBaby having a one-dimensional flow. The vocal run on "Sad Shit" was not initially present on the song. DJ K.i.D. explained it was "really a mistake that we did somewhere else. I caught it and held on to it and then placed it at the beginning of that track".

Much of the album's verses were recorded in hotel rooms or venue rooms, but also on the road and sometimes even before DaBaby had to perform a show. DJ K.i.D. explained the recording process between him and DaBaby: "Usually I play some loops, and he'll start rapping to the melody. I'll lay down a clap, hi-hats, probably a kick, sequence it to the point where it's a good enough loop, let him rap over it. There will be times where we'll be recording a verse and then I've gotta run on stage and do the opening set". Out of the songs that were recorded for the album, only two did not make the cut.

Regarding the album's content as a whole, Rolling Stone's Elias Leight noted:

"The album mainly sticks to the succinct, punishing formula DaBaby has perfected on his last four releases: roughly a dozen tracks, most of them less than three minutes long, full of emphatic, slugging rapping and vicious yet melodic bass lines".

== Critical reception ==
Professional ratings
Aggregate scores
Source	Rating
Metacritic	61/100
Review scores
Source	Rating
AllMusic	2.5/5 stars
Clash	4/10
Entertainment Weekly	B−
Exclaim!	7/10
HipHopDX	2.5/5 stars
NME	4/5 stars
Pitchfork	6.8/10
Rolling Stone	2.5/5 stars

Blame it on Baby received generally positive reviews from music critics. On the review aggregate website Metacritic, Blame It on Baby received a score of 61, based on eight reviews, indicating "generally favorable reviews".

In a positive review, Sam Moore of NME wrote that "DaBaby's detractors might not be defeated with Blame It On Baby, but this latest project succeeds by further propelling the rapper's soaring momentum even while in lockdown. Once this pandemic ends, expect DaBaby to be one of the first out of the blocks." Moore considered Megan Thee Stallion's feature on the album as the best and stated that DaBaby, with the album, is beginning to fight back against the "one-trick-pony accusations" that have been made of him. Yoh Phillips of DJBooth called the album "interesting", and said "instead of introducing a new perspective or revealing anything about himself that we didn't already know, DaBaby repeats familiar tropes alongside famous friends and over contemporary productions". He noted "Nasty", "Pick Up", and "Talk About It" as highlights. Entertainment Weekly's Sam Hockley-Smith wrote the following: "For the most part, Blame It on Baby is classic DaBaby. Minimal bass stabs and toybox plinks and whirrs accent joyful s--- talking. Songs generally clock in under three minutes. He sounds like he's having a lot of fun, which is all the album needs to be. But as the industry dictates, doing one thing well enough to get popular is not enough to stay popular, so there are also songs on here that paint him as lovelorn and heartbroken. It's not a great fit, not because he can't pull it off lyrically, but because it doesn't really sound like he even believes himself." Erin Lowers of Exclaim! commended DaBaby's decision to "step out of the box" on the album, stating "In the moments that DaBaby peels back his layers to reveal more than a persona, he feels connected and centered. Though we love the bops, sometimes balance is necessary to keep a career fresh."

Writing for Clash, Shakeena Johnson gave the album a mixed review, stating that while Blame it on Baby is "offering 13 tracks of Hennessy-infused rhyming, drums on drums on drums and a nasty Kidz Bop styled beat to tie it all together, the album is sadly a fresh reminder that DaBaby is hip-hop's biggest one-trick pony." Johnson continued by saying that "While I applaud him for going against the grain of most artists who are holding off of dropping new music during these quarantining times, the album doesn't quite match up to his potential or skillset. It hurts to admit it, but DaBaby has let us down with this one." Charles Holmes of Rolling Stone criticized DaBaby for not successfully delivering "something new" with the album, stating that "For every song that sees him [DaBaby] trying to do something new, there's one that features the same flow, adlibs, and antics that got him here – albeit with a new edge – all to diminishing returns."

Pitchfork's reviewer Dani Blum also criticized the album's alikeness to previous releases from DaBaby, writing that "half the album is stacked with the same regurgitated phrases and flows from earlier projects, stale the third time around; for the rest, DaBaby follows formulas other than his own." However, Blum praised the song "Blame It on Baby", stating that "the album's payoff arrives on the title track, a two-minute opus that stitches together four beat switches and contorts DaBaby's flow over and over. It builds, it thrills, it makes you feel like you can run through a wall – everything a DaBaby song can and should do, when he asks it of himself." In another mixed review, AllMusic critic Fred Thomas wrote the following: "Even with a few successful ventures into new territory, Blame It on Baby is pretty evenly divided between strong songs and duds. The bold, swagger-heavy rap songs are growing more tedious, and the experiments with singing and emotional nuance are mostly underdeveloped." Scott Glaysher of HipHopDX wrote that "Blame It on Baby is an obvious misstep in DaBaby's otherwise flawless rise to rap stardom. This isn't to say that he won't be back soon with something more substantial but as it stands, this album has his least playback value. Due to the small handful of pulse-pumping tracks and slight variance in his song-making, this album shouldn't automatically mark a downwards trajectory in Baby's career [...] It does show, however, that no buzz lasts forever and impactful music often takes time to create."

== Commercial performance ==
Blame It on Baby debuted at number one on the US Billboard 200 with 124,000 album-equivalent units (including 12,000 pure album sales) in its first week, becoming DaBaby's second album to top the chart. Additionally, 12 tracks from the album appeared on the Billboard Hot 100, with the album's second single "Rockstar" debuting at number nine on the chart and later reaching the top, becoming DaBaby's first single to achieve this. In its second week, the album dropped to number two on the chart, earning an additional 56,000 units. In its third week, the album dropped to number four on the chart, earning 48,000 more units. In its fourth week, the album dropped to number six on the chart, earning 45,000 units, bringing its four-week total to 273,000 album-equivalent units.

== Track listing ==
Standard edition
No.	Title	Writer(s)	Producer(s)	Length
1.	"Can't Stop"	Jonathan Kirk; Michael Hernandez; John Lucas; Carlos Goodwin, Jr.	Foreign Teck; JW Lucas; LosTheProducer	2:48
2.	"Pick Up" (featuring Quavo)	Kirk; Quavious Marshall; Dejuane Dunwood	DJ K.i.D	1:58
3.	"Lightskin Shit" (featuring Future and JetsonMade)	Kirk; Nayvadius Wilburn; Tahj Morgan; Tobias Dekker; Anton Mendo	JetsonMade; Outtatown; Starboy	1:51
4.	"Talk About It"	Kirk; Nils Noehden; Wesley Glass	Wheezy; Nils	2:39
5.	"Sad Shit"	Kirk; Dunwood; Thomas French	DJ K.i.D; Tom French	3:37
6.	"Find My Way"	Kirk; Dunwood	DJ K.i.D	2:19
7.	"Rockstar" (featuring Roddy Ricch)	Kirk; Rodrick Moore, Jr.; Ross Portaro IV	SethInTheKitchen	3:01
8.	"Jump" (featuring YoungBoy Never Broke Again)	Kirk; Kentrell Gaulden; Dunwood; Rocco Valdes	DJ K.i.D; Rocco Did It Again!	3:32
9.	"Champion"	Kirk; Dunwood; French	DJ K.i.D; French	2:12
10.	"Drop" (featuring A Boogie wit da Hoodie and London on da Track)	Kirk; Artist Dubose; London Holmes; Leon Krol; Mario Petersen	London on da Track; L.N.K.; Petersen	2:29
11.	"Blame It on Baby"	Kirk; Gaulden; Dunwood; Jacob Greenspan; Jasper Harris; Juho Tuovinen; Vladislav Mokhin	DJ K.i.D; Jae Green; Harris; Jayston; MVABeats	2:05
12.	"Nasty" (featuring Ashanti and Megan Thee Stallion)	Kirk; Ashanti Douglas; Megan Pete; Holmes; Andre Parker; Brad Jordan; Irving Lorenzo; Marcus Vest; Michael Dean	London on da Track	3:35
13.	"Amazing Grace"	Kirk; Paul Dawson	Ghost-Kid Da Produca	1:28
Total length:				33:34

Deluxe edition
No.	Title	Writer(s)	Producer(s)	Length
14.	"Billboard Baby"	Kirk; Anthony Mosley; Johnny Dutra; Shane Lindstrom	Sean Da Firzt; Dutra	1:21
15.	"Practice"	Kirk; Mosley	Sean Da Firzt	2:03
16.	"Peep Hole"	Kirk; Christopher Rosser	Quay Global	2:17
17.	"Blind" (featuring Young Thug)	Kirk; Jeffery Williams; Glass; Lukasz Gottwald	Wheezy; Dr. Luke	2:33
18.	"No Dribble" (featuring Stunna 4 Vegas)	Kirk; Khalick Caldwell; Kia Sands; Teddy Pena	RetroFuture; SVNDS	2:43
19.	"Go"	Kirk; Dunwood; Aiden Williams; Mathew Gomez	DJ K.i.D; 808iden; Gomez	2:28
20.	"Trouble"	Kirk; Portaro IV	SethInTheKitchen	2:40
21.	"Call It Even"	Kirk; Rosser	Quay Global	1:27
22.	"TLC" (featuring Gunna)	Kirk; Sergio Kitchens; Dunwood; Mendo	DJ K.i.D; Starboy	2:56
23.	"Go First" (featuring Stunna 4 Vegas and Rich Dunk)	Kirk; Caldwell; Davion Clyburn; Christopher Dotson; Christian Ward	Chrishan; Hitmaka	2:19
24.	"Rockstar (BLM Remix)" (featuring Roddy Ricch)	Kirk; Moore; Portaro IV	SethInTheKitchen	3:25
Total length:				59:53

Japanese deluxe edition (bonus tracks)
No.	Title	Writer(s)	Producer(s)	Length
25.	"Bop"	Kirk; Morgan; Anton Mendo	JetsonMade; Starboy	2:39
26.	"Suge"	Kirk; Morgan; Darryl Clemons	JetsonMade; Pooh Beatz	2:43
Total length:				65:17

Notes

- Every song title is stylized in all capital letters, for example, "Can't Stop" is stylized as "CAN'T STOP".
- "Nasty" samples "Baby" by Ashanti.

== Personnel ==
Credits adapted from Tidal.

- DaBaby – vocals
- Young Thug – vocals (4)
- Stunna 4 Vegas – vocals (5, 10)
- Gunna – vocals (9)
- Rich Dunk – vocals (10)
- Quavo – vocals (12)
- Future – vocals (13)
- Roddy Ricch – vocals (17, 24)
- YoungBoy Never Broke Again – vocals (18)
- A Boogie wit da Hoodie – vocals (20)
- Megan Thee Stallion – vocals (22)
- Chris West – mixer (1–15, 17–24)
- Angad "Bainz" Bains – mixer (4, 9), recording engineer (4, 9)
- Derek "MixedByAli" Ali – mixer (16, 17, 24)
- Glenn A Tabor III – mastering engineer (1–15, 17–23)
- Nicolas de Porcel – mastering engineer (16)
- Chris White – recording engineer (1, 2, 4, 7)
- Ricky P – recording engineer (3, 5)
- Taylor Moser – recording engineer (5)
- DJ K.i.D – recording engineer (6, 11–16, 21)
- Jaylon "Lux" Charles – recording engineer (7, 24)
- TBC – recording engineer (9)
- Arieas J Lee – recording engineer (10)
- Armin Lopez – recording engineer (13)
- Chris Dennis – recording engineer (17, 24)
- Liz Robson – recording engineer (17, 18, 20, 24)
- Khris James – recording engineer (18)
- Alex Estevez – recording engineer (20)
- Thomas Cullison – recording engineer (22)
- Rick Hertz – recording engineer (22)
- Ghost-Kid Da Produca – recording engineer (23)
- Shawn "Source" Jarrett – engineer (22)
- Curtis "Sircut" Bye – assistant mixer (16, 17, 24)
- Cyrus "Nois" Taghipour – assistant mixer (16, 17, 24)

== Charts ==
=== Weekly charts ===
Chart performance for Blame It on Baby
Chart (2020)	Peak position
Australian Albums (ARIA)	7
Austrian Albums (Ö3 Austria)	10
Belgian Albums (Ultratop Flanders)	8
Belgian Albums (Ultratop Wallonia)	21
Canadian Albums (Billboard)	1
Danish Albums (Hitlisten)	3
Dutch Albums (Album Top 100)	4
Estonian Albums (Eesti Tipp-40)	4
Finnish Albums (Suomen virallinen lista)	11
French Albums (SNEP)	29
German Albums (Offizielle Top 100)	28
Icelandic Albums (Tónlistinn)	5
Irish Albums (Official Charts)	5
Italian Albums (FIMI)	7
Lithuanian Albums (AGATA)	4
New Zealand Albums (RMNZ)	3
Norwegian Albums (VG-lista)	2
Swedish Albums (Sverigetopplistan)	6
Swiss Albums (Schweizer Hitparade)	9
UK Albums (Official Charts)	8
US Billboard 200	1
US Top R&B/Hip-Hop Albums (Billboard)	1

=== Year-end charts ===
2020 year-end chart performance for Blame It on Baby
Chart (2020)	Position
Canadian Albums (Billboard)	18
Danish Albums (Hitlisten)	27
Dutch Albums (Album Top 100)	17
French Albums (SNEP)	158
US Billboard 200	16
US Top R&B/Hip-Hop Albums (Billboard)	8

2021 year-end chart performance for Blame It on Baby
Chart (2021)	Position
US Billboard 200	52
US Top R&B/Hip-Hop Albums (Billboard)	37

== Certifications ==
Certifications and sales for Blame It on Baby
Region	Certification	Certified units/sales
Canada (Music Canada)	Platinum	80,000^{‡}
Denmark (IFPI Danmark)	Platinum	20,000^{‡}
France (SNEP)	Gold	50,000^{‡}
New Zealand (RMNZ) Deluxe	Platinum	15,000^{‡}
Poland (ZPAV)	Gold	10,000^{‡}
United States (RIAA)	2× Platinum	2,000,000^{‡}
^{‡} Sales+streaming figures based on certification alone.

== See also ==
- List of Billboard 200 number-one albums of 2020
