= Masterpiece (DaBaby song) =

2021 single by DaBaby

Single by DaBaby
- Released: January 15, 2021
- Genre: Hip hop; trap
- Length: 3:02
- Label: South Coast; Interscope Records
- Songwriter(s): Jonathan Kirk; David Doman; Christopher Torpey; Justin Thomas
- Producer(s): D.A. Got That Dope

DaBaby singles chronology
| "Coco" (2020) | "Masterpiece" (2021) | "Throat Baby (Go Baby) [Remix]" (2021) |

Music video
- "Masterpiece" on YouTube

"Masterpiece" is a song by American rapper DaBaby. It was released via South Coast Music Group/Interscope Records as a standalone single on January 15, 2021. His first release of the year, it was written alongside Christopher Torpey, Justin Vibes, and producer D.A. Got That Dope.

== Background and composition ==
DaBaby previewed the track on Instagram in December 2020. In the song, DaBaby references his relationship with DaniLeigh and his involvement in the November 2018 shooting incident in which he pleaded self-defense; the charges were later dropped.

== Music video ==
The music video, directed by Gemini Visions, was released alongside the single on January 15, 2021. The visual sees DaBaby surrounded by sports cars, private jets, and fans, while wearing all Gucci. DaBaby's then-girlfriend DaniLeigh also appears in the video. As of July 2024. the video has over 61 million views.

== Personnel ==
Credits adapted from Tidal.

- DaBaby – songwriting, vocals, lyrics
- D.A. Got That Dope – songwriting, lyrics, production
- Christopher Torpey – songwriting, synthesizer
- Justin Thomas – songwriting, lyrics
- Curtis "Sircuit" Bye – assistant mixing
- Jacob Bryant – assistant mixing
- Nicolas De Porcel – mastering engineer
- Derek "MixedByAli" Ali – mixing
- Javaun Mundle – recording engineer

== Charts ==
=== Weekly charts ===
Weekly chart performance for "Masterpiece"
| Chart (2021) | Peak position |
|---|---|
| Canada (Canadian Hot 100) | 71 |
| Global 200 (Billboard) | 93 |
| New Zealand Hot Singles (RMNZ) | 10 |
| US Billboard Hot 100 | 55 |
| US Hot R&B/Hip-Hop Songs (Billboard) | 20 |
| US Rhythmic (Billboard) | 22 |
| US Rolling Stone Top 100 | 44 |

=== Year-end charts ===
Year-end chart performance for "Masterpiece"
| Chart (2021) | Position |
|---|---|
| US Hot R&B/Hip-Hop Songs (Billboard) | 58 |

== Certifications ==
| Region | Certification | Certified units/sales |
|---|---|---|
| United States (RIAA) | Gold | 500,000^{‡} |
^{‡} Sales+streaming figures based on certification alone.

== Release history ==
| Country | Date | Format | Label | Ref. |
|---|---|---|---|---|
| Various | January 15, 2021 | Digital download; streaming | South Coast Music Group; Interscope | |
| United States | February 9, 2021 | Rhythmic contemporary radio | South Coast Music Group; Interscope | |
