= Kirk (album) =

2019 studio album by DaBaby

Studio album by DaBaby
- Released: September 27, 2019
- Recorded: 2019
- Genres: Hip hop; trap
- Length: 35:08
- Labels: Billion Dollar Baby; South Coast; Interscope
- Producers: 1st Class; Ambezza; CashMoneyAP; DJ Clue?; DJ K.i.D; Flip_00; Jasper Harris; JetsonMade; Kenny Beats; London on da Track; Mantiz; Myles William; Neeko Baby; Producer 20; Queen Sixties; Sean Da Firzt; SethInTheKitchen; Star Boy; Tahj Money

DaBaby chronology
Baby on Baby (2019)	Kirk (2019)	Blame It on Baby (2020)

Singles from Kirk
- 1. "Intro" Released: September 19, 2019; 2. "Bop" Released: November 19, 2019; 3. "Vibez" Released: March 31, 2020

Kirk (stylized as KIRK) is the second studio album by American rapper DaBaby. It was released on September 27, 2019, by Interscope Records, South Coast Music Group, and DaBaby's Billion Dollar Baby Entertainment.

The album features guest appearances from rappers Kevin Gates, Chance the Rapper, Gucci Mane, YK Osiris, Nicki Minaj, Lil Baby, Moneybagg Yo, Stunna 4 Vegas and Migos. The album topped the US Billboard 200, becoming DaBaby's first album to do so. The lead single "Intro" was released on September 19, 2019. The second single "Bop" was released on November 19. The third single "Vibez" was released on March 31, 2020.

== Background ==
DaBaby released his debut studio album Baby on Baby on March 1, 2019. Almost six months later on August 26, he revealed his next album's title to be Kirk, a homage to his late father. The cover art features DaBaby as an infant, sitting on his father's lap, who died sometime after the release of Baby on Baby.

== Release and promotion ==
Kirk was released on September 27, 2019, for digital download and streaming. DaBaby and Stunna 4 Vegas performed a medley of "Intro", "Really", and "Bop" on The Tonight Show Starring Jimmy Fallon on October 1, 2019.

On October 4, 2019, DaBaby revealed that he was going on a North American tour titled the "Kirk Tour" featuring Stunna 4 Vegas to promote the album from November 16 until December 21.

=== Singles ===
The album's lead single, "Intro" was released on September 19, 2019. The song debuted at number 17 on the US Billboard Hot 100. A music video directed by Reel Goats and shot in Hawaii was released the following day.

On November 15, 2019, he released a Broadway-inspired, Reel Goats-directed "musical" video for "Bop", titled "BOP on Broadway (Hip Hop Musical)", which featured the Jabbawockeez. It was sent to US rhythmic contemporary radio on November 19, 2019, as the album's second single. The song peaked at number 11 on the Hot 100 chart, making it the highest-charting song from the album, and his second highest-charting song ever at the time.

On October 1, 2019, a music video for "Vibez" was released. It was later sent to US rhythmic contemporary radio on March 31, 2020, as the album's third single. The song peaked at number 21 on the Hot 100 chart.

=== Other songs ===
A music video for "Off the Rip", directed by Reel Goats, was released on November 1, 2019.

== Critical reception ==
Professional ratings
Aggregate scores
Source	Rating
Metacritic	74/100
Review scores
Source	Rating
AllMusic	2.5/5 stars
Consequence of Sound	B−
Highsnobiety	3.5/5
HipHopDX	3.9/5
NME	4/5 stars
Pitchfork	7.6/10
Rolling Stone	4/5 stars

Kirk received generally positive reviews from music critics. At Metacritic, which assigns a normalized rating out of 100 to reviews from mainstream publications, the album received an average score of 74, based on seven reviews.

Danny Schwartz of Rolling Stone said that the album "shows why [DaBaby is] one of the year's most compelling breakout stars." Writing for NME, Kyann-Sian Williams' stating that "Although this record is often emotional, Kirk also races over snappy hit-hats and repetitive synths, showing off his giddy flow."

== Commercial performance ==
Kirk debuted at number one on the US Billboard 200 with 145,000 album-equivalent units (including 8,000 pure album sales) in its first week, becoming DaBaby's first album to top the chart. In its second week, the album dropped to number four on the chart, earning 78,000 album-equivalent units. In its third week, the album remained at number four on the chart, earning 55,000 more units. In its fourth week, the album remained at number five on the chart for a third consecutive week, earning 49,000 units bringing its four-week total to 327,000 units. It has sold 779,000 copies by the end of the year.

Additionally, all 13 tracks from the album charted on the Billboard Hot 100, with 12 tracks debuting the week following the album's release, led by "Bop", at number 19 (joining the album's "Intro", in its second week). This helped DaBaby chart 22 songs on the Hot 100 in 2019, the most of any artist. Outside the US, the album reached the top 20 in six other countries, including Canada, where it peaked at number 2.

== Track listing ==
Kirk track listing
No.	Title	Writer(s)	Producer(s)	Length
1.	"Intro"	Jonathan Kirk; De'Juane Dunwood	DJ K.i.D	2:52
2.	"Off the Rip"	Kirk; Anthony Mosey	Sean Da Firzt	1:55
3.	"Bop"	Kirk; Tahj Morgan; Anton Mendo	JetsonMade; Star Boy	2:39
4.	"Vibez"	Kirk; Morgan; Dondre Moore; Jasper Harris	JetsonMade; Neeko Baby; Harris	2:24
5.	"Pop Star" (featuring Kevin Gates)	Kirk; Kevin Gilyard; Alex Petit	CashMoneyAP; Ambezza^{[a]}	3:03
6.	"Gospel" (featuring Chance the Rapper, Gucci Mane, and YK Osiris)	Kirk; Chancelor Bennett; Radric Davis; Osiris Williams; Morgan; Kenyatta Griffin; Jay McCorkle	JetsonMade; 1st Class; Mantiz	3:34
7.	"iPhone" (with Nicki Minaj)	Kirk; Onika Maraj; Ross Portaro IV	SethInTheKitchen	3:11
8.	"Toes" (featuring Lil Baby and Moneybagg Yo)	Kirk; Dominique Jones; Demario White, Jr.; Kenneth Blume III; Joseph Karnes; Jared Scharff; Jeremy Ruzumna	Kenny Beats; Queen Sixties	2:16
9.	"Really" (featuring Stunna 4 Vegas)	Kirk; Khalick Caldwell; Portaro	SethInTheKitchen	2:19
10.	"Prolly Heard"	Kirk; Ernesto Shaw; Myles Moraites; Mathias Liyew; Jiseok Lee	Ambezza; DJ Clue?; Flip_00; Myles William	2:23
11.	"Raw Shit" (featuring Migos)	Kirk; Quavious Marshall; Kirshnik Ball; Kiari Cephus; Tahj Vaughn	Tahj Money	3:36
12.	"There He Go"	Kirk; London Holmes	London on da Track; Dez Wright^{[a]}	2:23
13.	"XXL"	Kirk; Antwain Fox	Producer 20	2:33
Total length:				35:08

Notes

- ^{^[a]} signifies an uncredited co-producer
- Every song title is stylized all caps, for example, "Intro" is stylized as "INTRO".

Sample credits

- "Intro" interpolates NSYNC's rendition of "O Holy Night".

== Personnel ==
- DJ Kid – recording (tracks 1–5, 9, 10)
- Xavier Daniel – recording (track 6)
- Thurston McCrea – recording (tracks 8, 11)
- Todd Bergman – engineering (Lil Baby) (tracks 8)
- Rodolfo Cruz – recording (track 11)
- Andrew Grossman – recording (track 12)
- Corey "Willy Frank" Wright – recording (track 13)
- Kevin "Black Pearl" McCloskey – mixing (all tracks)
- Chris West – mixing assistance (tracks 1, 6–8, 12)
- Danny Hurley – mixing assistance (all tracks)
- Aubry "Big Juice" Delaine – engineering (track 7)
- Elton Chueng – mastering (all tracks)

== Charts ==
=== Weekly charts ===
Weekly chart performance for Kirk on weekly charts
Chart (2019–2020)	Peak position
Australian Albums (ARIA)	11
Austrian Albums (Ö3 Austria)	57
Belgian Albums (Ultratop Flanders)	31
Belgian Albums (Ultratop Wallonia)	80
Canadian Albums (Billboard)	2
Danish Albums (Hitlisten)	19
Dutch Albums (Album Top 100)	15
Finnish Albums (Suomen virallinen lista)	29
German Albums (Offizielle Top 100)	98
Irish Albums (IRMA)	17
Italian Albums (FIMI)	81
Latvian Albums (LAIPA)	27
Lithuanian Albums (AGATA)	5
Norwegian Albums (VG-lista)	10
Swedish Albums (Sverigetopplistan)	27
Swiss Albums (Schweizer Hitparade)	40
UK Albums (Official Charts)	24
US Billboard 200	1
US Top R&B/Hip-Hop Albums (Billboard)	1

=== Year-end charts ===
Annual sales chart performance for Kirk
Chart (2019)	Position
US Billboard 200	104
US Top R&B/Hip-Hop Albums (Billboard)	40
Chart (2020)	Position
Belgian Albums (Ultratop Flanders)	176
Canadian Albums (Billboard)	44
US Billboard 200	19
US Top R&B/Hip-Hop Albums (Billboard)	12
Chart (2021)	Position
US Billboard 200	168

== Certifications ==
Certifications and sales for Kirk
Region	Certification	Certified units/sales
Denmark (IFPI Danmark)	Gold	10,000^{‡}
United States (RIAA)	2× Platinum	2,000,000^{‡}
^{‡} Sales+streaming figures based on certification alone.
