= Rockstar (DaBaby song) =

Single by DaBaby featuring Roddy Ricch

from the album Blame It on Baby
- Released: April 17, 2020
- Recorded: 2019
- Genre: Hip hop; trap
- Length: 3:01
- Label: Interscope; SCMG
- Songwriters: Jonathan Kirk; Rodrick Moore Jr.; Ross Portaro IV
- Producer: SethInTheKitchen

DaBaby singles chronology
"Find My Way" (2020)	"Rockstar" (2020)	"Buss It Down" (2020)

Roddy Ricch singles chronology
"Numbers" (2020)	"Rockstar" (2020)	"High Fashion" (2020)

Music video
- "Rockstar" on YouTube

BLM remix cover

"Rockstar" (stylized in all caps) is a song by American rapper DaBaby, featuring fellow American rapper Roddy Ricch. The song was released on April 17, 2020, as the second single from DaBaby's third studio album Blame It on Baby (2020). It was written by the two rappers. "Rockstar" spent seven non-consecutive weeks at the top of the Billboard Hot 100. Outside of the United States, "Rockstar" topped the charts in Australia, Austria, Canada, Denmark, Greece, New Zealand, Portugal, the Republic of Ireland, Switzerland, and the United Kingdom, and peaked within the top ten of the charts in Belgium, Germany, the Netherlands, France, Norway, Sweden, and Finland. Its music video is set in a zombie apocalypse.

On June 12, 2020, DaBaby released a "BLM (Black Lives Matter) remix" of "Rockstar", which replaces the intro with an extra verse from him, before the rest of the song, regarding the George Floyd protests that started in May 2020, and his own experience with police abuse. The song received nominations for Record of the Year, Best Melodic Rap Performance, and Best Rap Song at the 63rd Annual Grammy Awards.

== Critical reception ==
Reviewing the song's predecessor album for Entertainment Weekly, Sam Hockley-Smith found "Rockstar" and "Find My Way" "catchy and brooding", "allowing him [DaBaby] to rehash harrowing moments of violence, inner turmoil, and PTSD." In Pitchfork, Dani Blum noticed DaBaby "doesn't imitate Roddy Ricch as much as adjust his tone to complement the feature," thus, "his voice becomes softer, as close as DaBaby gets to tender, as he talks about the physical jolt of PTSD."

== Commercial performance ==
"Rockstar" reached number one on the Billboard Hot 100 in its seventh week, for the chart issue dated June 13, 2020. It became DaBaby's first chart-topper and Roddy Ricch's second. It also became DaBaby's first number one and Ricch's second on Hot R&B/Hip-Hop Songs and Hot Rap Songs charts. Along with "The Box", Ricch became the first artist to achieve his first two number one singles in the same year since Ed Sheeran did it in 2017. Topping the chart for a second week, it became the first single to spend multiple weeks on top after a run in which five songs each spent a first and only week at the summit. It spent seven non-consecutive weeks atop the chart. "Rockstar" also spent six weeks at number one in both Australia and the United Kingdom, and eight weeks at the top in the Republic of Ireland.

== Music video ==
DaBaby teased a music video for "Rockstar" a week before its release, posting pictures on Instagram of the filming location. The Reel Goats-directed video was premiered on June 26, 2020, starring the two rappers hunting zombies in an open field. The seven-minute video also features a scene set to DaBaby's chorus and first verse to "Amazing Grace", which also is featured on Blame It On Baby following by the credits playing his verse from the Black Lives Matter remix.

In Rolling Stone, Jon Blistein noted the video "boasts a distinctly cinematic feel" as the two rappers are heavily armed shooting a horde of zombies with "plenty of over-the-top action," that is "balanced by a refreshingly self-aware sequence" in which the two perform the song backed by a group of zombies dancing and playing instruments.

== Production ==
"Rockstar" was produced by North Carolina producer SethInTheKitchen, who also co-wrote the song. The instrumental for "Rockstar" is a melodic trap beat featuring a guitar loop created from Spectrasonics' Omnisphere. The drums consist of a two-step hi-hat pattern with assorted hat rolls, sampled claps, snares, and kicks. Its bassline features an 808.

== Awards and nominations ==
Year	Organization	Award	Result	Ref.
2020	MTV Video Music Awards	Song of Summer	Nominated	
2021	Grammy Awards	Record of the Year	Nominated	
2021	Grammy Awards	Best Melodic Rap Performance	Nominated	
2021	Grammy Awards	Best Rap Song	Nominated	

== "Rockstar Black Lives Matter Remix" ==
On June 12, 2020, a remix of the song, titled "Rockstar Black Lives Matter Remix", was released. It joined many other protest songs that spoke out against police brutality in the wake of the killing of Breonna Taylor and murder of George Floyd. Jessica McKinney of Complex explained how on this version, DaBaby "discusses his multiple run-ins with the police, saying, 'Cops wanna pull me over, embarrass me/Abusin' power, you never knew me, thought I was arrogant/As a juvenile, police pulled their guns like they scared of me'", while Roddy Ricch "shares a similar experience, recalling a time the police stopped him at a gas station". It later ended up on the deluxe version of Blame It On Baby, which was released on August 4, 2020.

== Live performances ==
DaBaby and Ricch performed the song live at the 2020 BET Awards. The performance opened in a close-up shot of DaBaby on the ground with the knee of a police officer sitting on his neck — a recreation of George Floyd's murder. He then appeared surrounded by protesters — channeling the nationwide protests against police brutality — and performing in front of burning police cars. Ricch joined him for his verse, standing atop a cop car. The duo also performed the song at the Grammy Awards in 2021.

== Charts ==
=== Weekly charts ===
Chart (2020–21)	Peak position
Australia (ARIA)	1
Austria (Ö3 Austria Top 40)	1
Belgium (Ultratop 50 Flanders)	2
Belgium (Ultratop 50 Wallonia)	9
Canada Hot 100 (Billboard)	1
Canada CHR/Top 40 (Billboard)	7
Czech Republic Singles Digital (ČNS IFPI)	3
Denmark (Tracklisten)	1
Finland (Suomen virallinen lista)	4
France (SNEP)	6
Germany (GfK)	3
Global 200 (Billboard)	8
Greece (IFPI)	1
Hungary (Single Top 40)	10
Hungary (Stream Top 40)	4
Iceland (Tónlistinn)	9
Ireland (IRMA)	1
Italy (FIMI)	8
Lithuania (AGATA)	16
Malaysia (RIM)	15
Netherlands (Dutch Top 40)	12
Netherlands (Single Top 100)	1
New Zealand (Recorded Music NZ)	1
Norway (VG-lista)	2
Poland Airplay (ZPAV)	44
Portugal (AFP)	1
Romania (Airplay 100)	83
Scottish Singles Sales (Official Charts)	4
Singapore (RIAS)	8
Slovakia Airplay (ČNS IFPI)	41
Slovakia Singles Digital (ČNS IFPI)	2
Spain (PROMUSICAE)	38
Sweden (Sverigetopplistan)	3
Switzerland (Schweizer Hitparade)	1
UK Singles (Official Charts)	1
US Billboard Hot 100	1
US Dance Airplay (Billboard)	8
US Hot R&B/Hip-Hop Songs (Billboard)	1
US Pop Airplay (Billboard)	4
US Rhythmic Airplay (Billboard)	1
US Rolling Stone Top 100	1

=== Year-end charts ===
Chart (2020)	Position
Australia (ARIA)	5
Austria (Ö3 Austria Top 40)	8
Belgium (Ultratop Flanders)	16
Belgium (Ultratop Wallonia)	31
Canada (Canadian Hot 100)	13
Denmark (Tracklisten)	6
France (SNEP)	27
Germany (Official German Charts)	8
Hungary (Single Top 40)	72
Hungary (Stream Top 40)	10
Iceland (Tónlistinn)	43
Ireland (IRMA)	4
Italy (FIMI)	39
Netherlands (Dutch Top 40)	67
Netherlands (Single Top 100)	5
New Zealand (Recorded Music NZ)	8
Norway (VG-lista)	6
Portugal (AFP)	9
Sweden (Sverigetopplistan)	8
Switzerland (Schweizer Hitparade)	6
UK Singles (OCC)	7
US Billboard Hot 100	5
US Dance/Mix Show Airplay (Billboard)	27
US Hot R&B/Hip-Hop Songs (Billboard)	3
US Mainstream Top 40 (Billboard)	20
US Rhythmic (Billboard)	1
Worldwide (IFPI)	8

Chart (2021)	Position
Australia (ARIA)	64
Canada (Canadian Hot 100)	43
France (SNEP)	180
Global 200 (Billboard)	46
Portugal (AFP)	79
Switzerland (Schweizer Hitparade)	88
US Hot R&B/Hip-Hop Songs (Billboard)	49

== Certifications ==
Region	Certification	Certified units/sales
Australia (ARIA)	5× Platinum	350,000^{‡}
Austria (IFPI Austria)	Platinum	30,000^{‡}
Belgium (BRMA)	2× Platinum	80,000^{‡}
Brazil (Pro-Música Brasil)	2× Diamond	320,000^{‡}
Canada (Music Canada)	8× Platinum	640,000^{‡}
Denmark (IFPI Danmark)	2× Platinum	180,000^{‡}
France (SNEP)	Diamond	333,333^{‡}
Germany (BVMI)	3× Gold	600,000^{‡}
Italy (FIMI)	2× Platinum	140,000^{‡}
Netherlands (NVPI)	Gold	40,000^{‡}
New Zealand (RMNZ)	5× Platinum	150,000^{‡}
Poland (ZPAV)	2× Platinum	100,000^{‡}
Portugal (AFP)	3× Platinum	30,000^{‡}
Spain (Promusicae)	Platinum	40,000^{‡}
United Kingdom (BPI)	3× Platinum	1,800,000^{‡}
United States (RIAA)	9× Platinum	9,000,000^{‡}
Streaming
Greece (IFPI Greece)	2× Platinum	4,000,000^{†}
^{‡} Sales+streaming figures based on certification alone.^{†} Streaming-only figures based on certification alone.

== Release history ==
Region	Date	Format	Version	Label	Ref.
Various	April 17, 2020	Digital download; streaming	Original	Interscope; South Coast Music Group	
Italy	April 24, 2020	Contemporary hit radio	Original	Universal	
United Kingdom	April 24, 2020	Contemporary hit radio	Original	Universal	
United Kingdom	April 24, 2020	Urban contemporary radio	Original	Universal	
Various	June 12, 2020	Digital download; streaming	Remix	Interscope; South Coast Music Group	
United States	June 23, 2020	Contemporary hit radio	Original	Interscope; South Coast Music Group	
United States	December 5, 2025	7-inch vinyl	Original; remix	Interscope; South Coast Music Group	

== See also ==
- List of Billboard Hot 100 number ones of 2020
