= DJ K.i.D =

American record producer and DJ

- Birth name: De'Juane Malachi Dunwood
- Also known as: K.i.D; Ayo K.i.D
- Born: 1999; Santa Clara, California, United States
- Genres: Hip-hop; R&B
- Occupations: Record producer; DJ; entrepreneur
- Years active: 2018–present
- Labels: Interscope

De'Juane Malachi Dunwood (born 1999), better known by his stage name DJ K.i.D, is an American record producer, DJ, and entrepreneur. He is best known for being a DJ for rapper DaBaby and producing multiple of his songs.

== Early life ==
Dunwood was born in Santa Clara, California.

== Career ==
Dunwood started DJ'ing for rapper DaBaby on September 1, 2018, at The Biggest Pregame Block Party at East Carolina University. The first song he produced for DaBaby was his 2019 single "Intro", which peaked at number 13 on the Billboard Hot 100. Dunwood engineered seven songs on his follow-up album, Blame It on Baby (2020).

== Other ventures ==
Dunwood has also created his own brand of bottled water, titled K20 Water.

== Production discography ==
=== Charted singles ===
| Title | Year | Peak chart positions | | | | | Album |
| Title | Year | US | US R&B/HH | AUS | CAN | UK | Album |
|---|---|---|---|---|---|---|---|
| "Intro" (DaBaby) | 2019 | 13 | 8 | — | 26 | 97 | Kirk |
| "Find My Way" (DaBaby) | 2020 | 22 | 12 | 47 | 33 | 46 | Blame It on Baby |
