= Intro (DaBaby song) =

2019 single by DaBaby

Single by DaBaby

from the album Kirk
- Released: September 19, 2019
- Genre: Hip hop
- Length: 2:52
- Label: Interscope
- Songwriters: Jonathan Kirk; De'Juane Dunwood; Traditional
- Producer: DJ Kid

DaBaby singles chronology
"Enemies" (2019)	"Intro" (2019)	"Heartless" (2019)

Music video
- "Intro" on YouTube

"Intro" (stylized in all-caps) is a song by American rapper DaBaby, released as the lead single and opening track from his second studio album Kirk on September 19, 2019.

The song peaked at number 13 on the US Billboard Hot 100.

== Music and lyrics ==
The song explores themes of family and DaBaby handling his newfound success. The song strays away from his usual comedic subject matter, which is synonymous with his music. He explains how he found out about his father's passing only moments before he was informed that his debut studio album, Baby on Baby, debuted atop the Billboard Mainstream R&B/Hip-Hop chart.

The song is produced by DJ K.i.D, who sampled NSYNC's 1998 rendition of "O Holy Night" for the song. The song's chorus makes references to Martin and Gina, characters from the TV series Martin, and tennis players and sisters Venus and Serena Williams.

== Music video ==
The music video was released on September 20, 2019. It begins with DaBaby walking towards a casket at a church, before then cutting to a scene of DaBaby celebrating his newfound success. The video, directed by Reel Goats, was shot in Hawaii. As of April 2021 the video has over 60 million views on YouTube.

== Critical reception ==
The song received positive reviews, with Rolling Stone's Charles Holmes deeming it a "heart-wrenching portrait of loss", calling it DaBaby's "best song yet", as DaBaby drops his comedically tough facade in favor of a more sincere approach to the song.

== Chart performance ==
The song peaked at number 13 on the US Billboard Hot 100, becoming his third song to reach the top 20 on the chart, and second as the lead artist.

== Charts ==
=== Weekly charts ===
Chart (2019)	Peak position
Canada (Canadian Hot 100)	26
Ireland (IRMA)	70
New Zealand Hot Singles (RMNZ)	6
UK Singles (OCC)	97
US Billboard Hot 100	13
US Hot R&B/Hip-Hop Songs (Billboard)	8
US Rolling Stone Top 100	1

=== Year-end charts ===
Chart (2019)	Position
US Hot R&B/Hip-Hop Songs (Billboard)	98

== Certifications ==
Certifications and sales for Intro
Region	Certification	Certified units/sales
United States (RIAA)	Platinum	1,000,000^{‡}
^{‡} Sales+streaming figures based on certification alone.
