= DaBaby =

American rapper (born 1991)

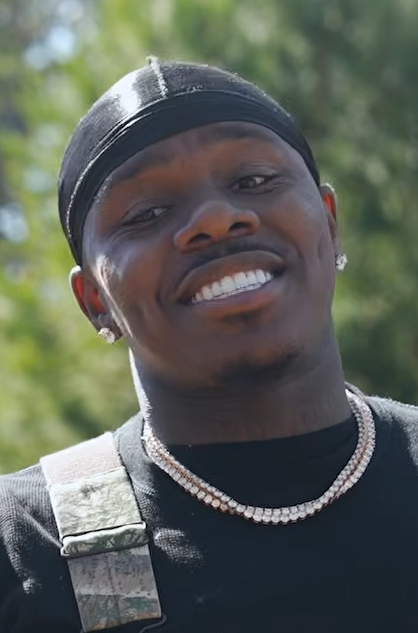
- DaBaby in 2026

Background information
- Also known as: Baby; Baby Jesus
- Born: Jonathan Lyndale Kirk; December 22, 1991 (age 34) (Note: Mecklenburg public records show DaBaby's birth date as being December 21, 1991. However, DaBaby himself has stated his birth date is December 22, 1991.); Cleveland, Ohio, U.S.
- Origin: Charlotte, North Carolina, U.S.
- Genres: Southern hip-hop; trap
- Occupations: Rapper; songwriter
- Works: DaBaby discography
- Years active: 2014–present
- Labels: Billion Dollar Baby; Interscope; South Coast
- Children: 4
- Website: officialdababy.com

Jonathan Lyndale Kirk (born December 22, 1991), known professionally as DaBaby (formerly Baby Jesus), is an American rapper. After releasing several mixtapes between 2014 and 2018, he signed with Interscope Records in January 2019. His debut studio album, Baby on Baby (2019), spawned the single "Suge", which peaked within the top ten of the Billboard Hot 100 a month after its release.

His second studio album, Kirk (2019), debuted atop the Billboard 200 and spawned the hit singles "Intro" and "Bop". That same year, he guest appeared on the singles "Enemies" by Post Malone and "Cash Shit" by Megan Thee Stallion. His third album, Blame It on Baby (2020), also peaked the Billboard 200; its single, "Rockstar" (featuring Roddy Ricch), spent seven non-consecutive weeks atop the Billboard Hot 100 in the wake of that year's George Floyd protests. Furthermore, it received quintuple platinum certification by the Recording Industry Association of America (RIAA) and was nominated for Record of the Year at the 63rd Annual Grammy Awards.

In 2020, he guest performed on the remix of "Whats Poppin" by Jack Harlow and the single "Levitating" by Dua Lipa, both of which peaked at number two on the Billboard Hot 100. In the wake of controversies regarding homophobia, he released the collaborative mixtape Better than You (2022) with YoungBoy Never Broke Again, followed by his fourth album, Baby on Baby 2 (2022). Kirk's fifth album, Be More Grateful (2026), included the top-40 single "Pop Dat Thang".

== Early life ==
Jonathan Lyndale Kirk was born on December 22, 1991, in Cleveland, Ohio. He moved to Charlotte, North Carolina, at age six, where he spent most of his early years. He attended Zebulon B. Vance High School, now called Julius L. Chambers High School, where he graduated in 2010.

He attended the University of North Carolina at Greensboro for two years. He did not complete his studies, saying he only went to college for his parents' sake. He grew up listening to Eminem, 50 Cent and Lil Wayne with his two older brothers.

== Career ==
=== 2014–2018: Early mixtapes ===
Kirk began taking music seriously between 2014 and 2015. In 2015, he started off his music career by releasing Nonfiction, his debut mixtape. He followed this up with his God's Work mixtape series, Baby Talk mixtape series, Billion Dollar Baby, and Back on My Baby Jesus Sh*t. He initially performed under the name Baby Jesus, which he eventually changed out of concern that it had become a distraction.

Kirk got his big break after signing to Arnold Taylor, the president of the South Coast Music Group label, a big radio promoter. Taylor saw Kirk perform around North Carolina clubs at the time he [Taylor] was launching his label. Taylor had been responsible for the early rise of Southern rap stars including Yo Gotti and Future. Once they started working together, the team kept building buzz around the South with mixtapes and club shows, while Kirk was finding his sound.

Through his deal with South Coast, Kirk signed a short-lived distribution deal with Jay-Z's Roc Nation for his Blank Blank mixtape that would prove to be his breakout in late 2018. Thanks to the guidance of Taylor, and following major label bidding wars, Kirk landed a seven-figure recording deal with Interscope.

=== 2019: Baby on Baby and Kirk ===
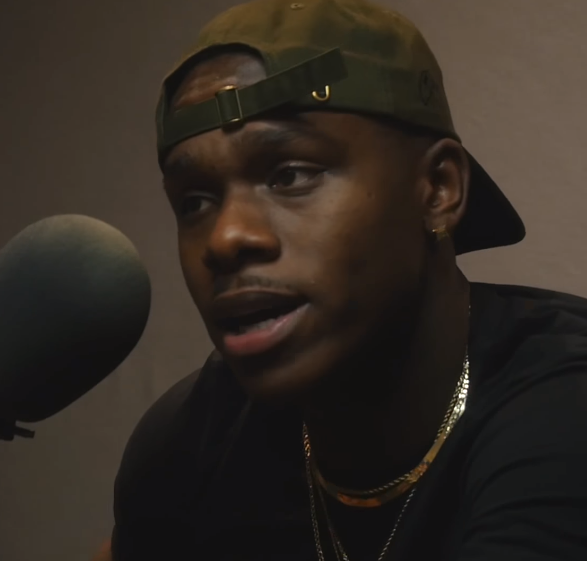
DaBaby during an interview in 2017

In January 2019, upon being signed to Interscope, Kirk launched his own imprint, Billion Dollar Baby Entertainment. In March 2019, Kirk's debut studio album Baby on Baby, was released via Interscope Records and South Coast Music Group in a joint venture with both labels. The thirteen-track project features guest appearances from Offset, Rich Homie Quan, Rich the Kid and Stunna 4 Vegas.

Baby on Baby debuted at number 25 on the Billboard 200 albums chart in the US. The song "Suge" debuted on the Billboard Hot 100 at number 87 on the chart, dated April 13, 2019, and reached the top 10 on the chart, dated June 8, 2019. Kirk was featured on the cover of XXL as part of the Freshman Class of 2019.

Kirk featured on various hit songs throughout mid-2019, including Megan Thee Stallion's "Cash Shit" and Quality Control's "Baby", both of which reached the top 40 on the Billboard Hot 100. In July 2019, Kirk was featured on Dreamville's compilation album Revenge of the Dreamers III, on the opening track, "Under the Sun". He received acclaim for his guest feature, with various publications ranking it as his best verse of 2019, including Complex magazine calling it a "defining breakout moment for a new rap superstar".

In August 2019, he announced that his second album would be titled Kirk, named after his surname. It was released in September, and debuted atop the US Billboard 200. Its lead single, "Intro", was successful, peaking at number 13 on the US Billboard Hot 100 chart. Around that time, Kirk also made notable appearances on singles such as Post Malone's "Enemies", which peaked at number 16 on the Billboard Hot 100, and on the remixes to YG's "Stop Snitchin", Lizzo's "Truth Hurts", and Lil Nas X's "Panini", released in May, August, and September 2019, respectively. In October, he made a cameo appearance in the music video for his protégé, Rich Dunk's single "High School".

Kirk closed 2019 having 22 entries on the Billboard Hot 100 for the year, the most of any artist that year.

=== 2020–present: Blame It on Baby, My Brother's Keeper, allegations of homophobia, Baby on Baby 2, and Be More Grateful ===
At the 62nd Annual Grammy Awards, held in 2020, Kirk received two nominations, both for "Suge", in the categories Best Rap Performance and Best Rap Song. His third studio album, Blame It on Baby, was released in April 2020. The album received mixed to positive reviews, and achieved commercial success, debuting atop the Billboard 200 with 124,000 album-equivalent units, becoming Kirk's second number-one album. It produced his highest-charting song, "Rockstar", featuring Roddy Ricch, which spent seven non-consecutive weeks at number-one on the Billboard Hot 100, and reached number-one in the United Kingdom.

In June, Kirk was featured on the remix for the Jack Harlow song "Whats Poppin", which peaked at number two on the Hot 100 while "Rockstar" was still at the top. This made DaBaby the 20th act to occupy the chart's top 2 positions, and the first since Ariana Grande in 2019. In July, Kirk was featured on "For the Night" by Pop Smoke and Lil Baby, which debuted at number six on the Hot 100. As a result, DaBaby became the seventh act to chart at least three songs in the top six simultaneously.

In July 2020, Kirk released a single with his signee Stunna 4 Vegas, titled "No Dribble", included on the deluxe edition of Blame It on Baby, which was released in August 2020, and described by DaBaby as a "brand new album". In November 2020, DaBaby released his debut EP, My Brother's Keeper (Long Live G). It pays tribute to his late brother, Glenn Johnson, and features appearances from Meek Mill, NoCap, Toosii, and Polo G. Kirk contributed a feature on the remix of "Levitating" by English singer Dua Lipa. Though the remix was released in late 2020, the song began climbing up the charts and peaked at number 2 on the Billboard Hot 100 in 2021.

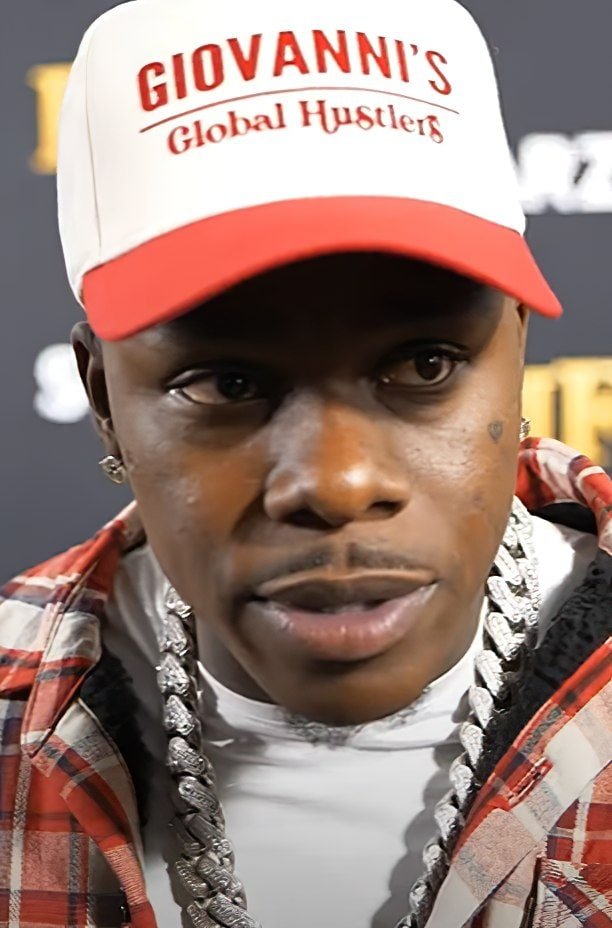
DaBaby in 2021

In January 2021, DaBaby released the single "Masterpiece" alongside a music video for the track directed by Gemini Visions. The track includes references to his relationship with DaniLeigh and to his past legal troubles. In February, DaBaby released a remix to SpotemGottem's single Beat Box, along with a music video. He released the June singles "Ball If I Want To", and "Red Light Green Light", and "Giving What It's Supposed To Give" in July.

In July 2021, Kirk faced backlash for remarks largely regarded to be homophobic. While performing at the Rolling Loud Festival in Miami Gardens, Florida on July 25, he said, "[If] you didn't show up today with HIV/AIDS, or any of them deadly sexually transmitted diseases that'll make you die in two to three weeks, then put a cellphone light in the air. Ladies, if your pussy smell [sic] like water, put a cellphone light in the air. Fellas, if you ain't sucking dick in the parking lot, put a cellphone light in the air." In the wake of his remarks, DaBaby's scheduled appearance at Lollapalooza on August 1 was cancelled and later replaced by G Herbo. The fashion brand BoohooMAN ended its collaboration with Kirk. On August 2, the organizers of the Governors Ball Music Festival announced Kirk had been removed from the 2021 lineup as a result of his comments. He was also cut from Parklife Festival, Day N Vegas, Austin City Limits Festival, Music Midtown, and the iHeartRadio Music Festival. Radio stations substituted a version of the "Levitating" remix without his contribution, resulting in his credit being removed on the Billboard Airplay Charts on August 9. On August 24, he also addressed being "canceled" in a freestyle over Bia's song "Whole Lotta Money".

In March 2022, he released the mixtape Better than You with YoungBoy Never Broke Again. In September, he released his fourth studio album, Baby on Baby 2.

In 2025, DaBaby performed in Russia, despite his record label (owned by Universal Music Group) suspending all activities in Russia following the Russian invasion of Ukraine.

On January 5, 2026, he announced his fifth studio album, Be More Grateful. DaBaby said it would be a reflective album with more sensitive topics such as family and growing up. It released on January 16. The album spawned the single "Pop Dat Thang", which peaked in the top 40 of the Billboard Hot 100 and was commercially successful worldwide.

== Billion Dollar Baby Entertainment ==
Billion Dollar Baby
- Founded: 2017
- Founder: DaBaby
- Status: Active
- Distributor: Interscope Capitol Labels Group
- Genre: Hip hop; trap
- Country of origin: U.S.
- Location: Charlotte, North Carolina

Billion Dollar Baby Entertainment is an American record label founded by DaBaby in 2017, based in Charlotte, North Carolina. DaBaby spoke about intending to focus on the record label saying "I won't be rapping in five years; I won't be rapping. I'll be creating other superstars."

=== Roster ===
- Stunna 4 Vegas
- DJ K.i.D
- Rich Dunk
- KayyKilo
- Wisdom

== Artistry ==
=== Music ===
Charles Holmes of Rolling Stone described Kirk's flow as a "staccato, precise, and brutal rapping style, a syllable-crushing force delivered with such forward momentum it often gives the illusion that he starts rapping before the beat begins". According to Holmes, the most notable example of this effect is in his breakthrough hit "Suge".

Speaking on his influences, Kirk has said he studied artists like Future, Lil Wayne and Kanye West, who he says "came up and consistently progressed". He further elaborated: "I've studied all the genius marketers throughout the rap game. I borrow from anybody with something to offer". Jeff Weiss of The Guardian favorably compared to Kirk to Busta Rhymes, Eminem, Missy Elliott and Ludacris, noting the similarities in their musical styles which include "inventive rap stylists unafraid to make videos full of funny parodies and rubber-faced camera goofs". According to Weiss, Kirk "reflects an anachronistic approach to the rap game. If the charts are filled with opiated threnodies about addiction and sadness, he eschews singing in favor of raps that could take your head off". Kirk has said "I can't sing, but I'll hit some notes here and there".

=== Music videos ===
DaBaby often collaborates with Reel Goats. Jessica McKinney of Complex wrote that their videos "always have comedic and fun elements to them."

== Personal life ==
Kirk has a stepson born in 2014 and three daughters born in 2017, 2020, and 2021.

Kirk's father died in 2019 shortly after the release of his debut studio album. His second album is a tribute to his last name, with the cover being his father holding him as an infant. Kirk's brother, Glen Johnson, died in November 2020, at age 34, from a self-inflicted gunshot wound.

Regarding his religious beliefs, he stated in 2019 that "I'm blessed. I'm covered by the blood of Christ."

He dated fellow American rapper and singer DaniLeigh in 2020. The couple split in February 2021. Months after the split, a viral incident of the two was recorded and posted on Instagram where it was reportedly confirmed that Kirk had fathered a child with her.

He supported but did not vote for Kanye West's 2020 presidential campaign and supported Donald Trump's 2024 presidential campaign.

== Legal issues ==
In November 2018, Kirk shot a 19-year-old man in the abdomen at a Walmart in Huntersville, North Carolina. The man, Jaylin Domonique Craig, died soon after. Kirk confirmed his involvement in the shooting and said that he acted in self-defense. The most serious charges were dropped in March 2019, and he pleaded guilty to carrying a concealed weapon, a misdemeanor.

In April 2022, Rolling Stone released the surveillance tape of the incident, sparking renewed scrutiny in the incident after Kirk shot a trespasser at his Troutman, North Carolina, estate earlier that month. No one was charged for the incident in Troutman.

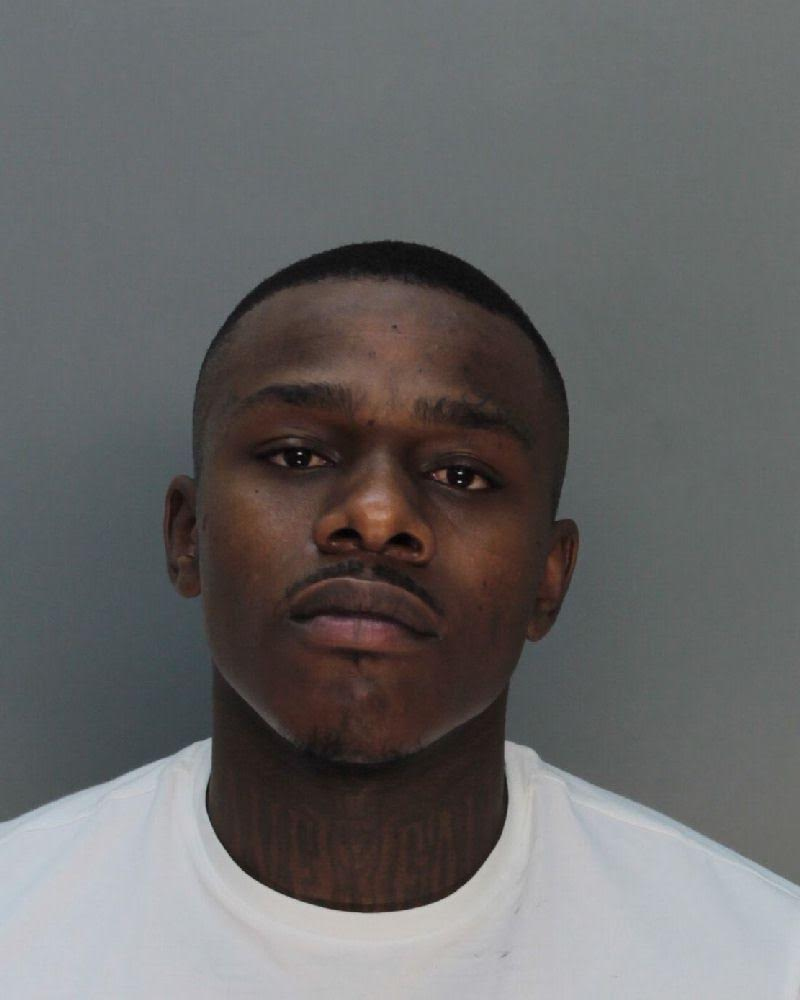
A 2020 mugshot

In January 2020, Kirk was detained and questioned in Miami in connection with a robbery investigation. He was later arrested after authorities found he had an arrest warrant out in Texas stemming from a battery charge. According to TMZ and other outlets, members of his crew allegedly assaulted and robbed a music promoter who only paid Kirk $20,000 of the $30,000 he was owed for a performance in Miami. Reports state that he and his associates allegedly took $80 cash, an iPhone 7, and a credit card from the promoter. Kirk was charged with battery and released from Miami-Dade County jail 48 hours later.

During Kirk's 2020 "Up Close N Personal" tour, he slapped a female fan on his way to the stage for a performance in Tampa, Florida. The crowd responded by booing, and he left the venue without performing any songs. He said that he struck her because she placed her phone too close to his face while taking a video with the flash on. In a video posted on Instagram, Kirk said, "I do apologize that there was a female on the other end. I think by this time, you know it's a well known fact that male or female, I would've responded the same exact way."

In February 2022, Kirk and his crew assaulted DaniLeigh's brother Brandon Bills at a bowling alley in the Los Angeles area. Later that year, Kirk was charged with felony battery for an alleged assault against a rental property owner in Los Angeles. In 2024, he pleaded guilty to misdemeanor simple battery for the incident.

== Discography ==
Studio albums

- Baby on Baby (2019)
- Kirk (2019)
- Blame It on Baby (2020)
- Baby on Baby 2 (2022)
- Be More Grateful (2026)

== Tours ==
=== Headlining ===
- Baby on Baby Tour (2019)
- Kirk Tour (2019)
- Live Show Killa Tour (2021)
- Baby on Baby 2 Tour (2022)
- Be More Grateful Tour

== Awards and nominations ==
List of awards and nominations received by DaBaby
Award	Year	Recipient(s) and nominee(s)	Category	Result	Ref.
ASCAP Rhythm & Soul Music Awards	2020	"Baby Sitter"	Winning R&B/Hip-Hop Songs	Won	
ASCAP Rhythm & Soul Music Awards	2020	"Cash Shit" (with Megan Thee Stallion)	Winning R&B/Hip-Hop Songs	Won	
ASCAP Rhythm & Soul Music Awards	2020	"Suge"	Top R&B/Hip-Hop Song	Won	
BET Awards	2020	Kirk	Album of the Year	Nominated	
BET Awards	2020	"Bop"	Video of the Year	Nominated	
BET Awards	2020	"Bop"	Viewers' Choice Award	Nominated	
BET Awards	2020	Himself	Best Male Hip Hop Artist	Won	
BET Awards	2021	Blame It on Baby	Album of the Year	Nominated	
BET Awards	2021	"Rockstar" (feat. Roddy Ricch)	Viewers' Choice Award	Nominated	
BET Awards	2021	"Rockstar" (feat. Roddy Ricch)	Best Collaboration	Nominated	
BET Awards	2021	"Whats Poppin (Remix)" (with Jack Harlow, Tory Lanez, and Lil Wayne)	Best Collaboration	Nominated	
BET Awards	2021	"Cry Baby" (with Megan Thee Stallion)	Best Collaboration	Nominated	
BET Awards	2021	"For the Night" (with Pop Smoke and Lil Baby)	Best Collaboration	Nominated	
BET Awards	2021	Himself	Best Male Hip Hop Artist	Nominated	
BET Hip Hop Awards	2019	"Suge"	Best Hip Hop Video	Nominated	
BET Hip Hop Awards	2019	Himself	Hot Ticket Performer	Nominated	
BET Hip Hop Awards	2019	Himself	Best New Hip Hop Artist	Won	
BET Hip Hop Awards	2022	DaBaby & YoungBoy Never Broke Again	Best Duo/Group	Nominated	
BET Hip Hop Awards	2023	"Shake Sumn"	Best Hip-hop Video	Nominated	
BET Hip Hop Awards	2023	Himself	Best Live Performer	Nominated	
BET Hip Hop Awards	2023	DaBaby & Reel Goats	Video Director of the Year	Nominated	
Billboard Music Awards	2021	Himself	Top Hot 100 Artist	Nominated	
Billboard Music Awards	2021	Himself	Top Streaming Songs Artist	Nominated	
Billboard Music Awards	2021	Himself	Top Rap Artist	Nominated	
Billboard Music Awards	2021	Blame It on Baby	Top Rap Album	Nominated	
Billboard Music Awards	2021	"Rockstar" (feat. Roddy Ricch)	Top Hot 100 Song	Nominated	
Billboard Music Awards	2021	"Rockstar" (feat. Roddy Ricch)	Top Streaming Song	Won	
Billboard Music Awards	2021	"Rockstar" (feat. Roddy Ricch)	Top Collaboration	Nominated	
Billboard Music Awards	2021	"Rockstar" (feat. Roddy Ricch)	Top Rap Song	Won	
Grammy Award	2020	"Suge"	Best Rap Performance	Nominated	
Grammy Award	2020	"Suge"	Best Rap Song	Nominated	
Grammy Award	2021	"Rockstar" (feat. Roddy Ricch)	Record of the Year	Nominated	
Grammy Award	2021	"Rockstar" (feat. Roddy Ricch)	Best Melodic Rap Performance	Nominated	
Grammy Award	2021	"Rockstar" (feat. Roddy Ricch)	Best Rap Song	Nominated	
Grammy Award	2021	"Bop"	Best Rap Performance	Nominated	
Grammy Award	2022	Justice (Triple Chucks Deluxe) (Justin Bieber)	Album of the Year	Nominated	
Grammy Award	2022	Donda (Kanye West)	Album of the Year	Nominated	
iHeartRadio Music Awards	2020	Himself	Best New Hip-Hop Artist	Won	
iHeartRadio Music Awards	2020	"Suge"	Hip-Hop Song of the Year	Won	
iHeartRadio Music Awards	2021	Himself	Hip-Hop Artist of the Year	Nominated	
iHeartRadio Music Awards	2021	"Rockstar" (featuring Roddy Ricch)	Song of the Year	Nominated	
iHeartRadio Music Awards	2021	"Rockstar" (featuring Roddy Ricch)	Hip-Hop Song of the Year	Nominated	
iHeartRadio Titanium Awards	2021	"Rockstar" (featuring Roddy Ricch)	1 Billion Total Audience Spins on iHeartRadio Stations	Won	
MTV Video Music Awards	2019	"Suge"	Song of Summer	Nominated	

== See also ==
- List of artists who reached number one in the United States
