= 2019 in hip-hop =

This article summarizes the events, album releases, and album release dates in hip-hop for the year 2019.

== Events ==
=== January ===
- On January 8, Cupcakke was hospitalized following a suicide scare.
- On January 23, 6ix9ine admitted to being guilty of all charges related to racketeering and gang violence.
- On January 25, DMX was again released from prison.
- On January 27, Florida rapper Jayo Sama was killed in a drive-by shooting in West Palm Beach, Florida. He was 22 years old.

=== February ===
- On February 3, 21 Savage was arrested by the U.S. Immigration and Customs Enforcement (ICE) for having an expired visa and was revealed to be a United Kingdom national.
- On February 9, English grime rapper Cadet was killed in a car accident, at age 28.
- On February 10, Cardi B won a Grammy Award for Best Rap Album with Invasion of Privacy and Drake won a Grammy Award for Best Rap Song with "God's Plan".
- On February 12, Mystikal was released from prison on $3 million bond.
- On February 13, YNW Melly turned himself in to authorities and was charged with the double murder of rappers and childhood friends YNW Sakchaser and YNW Juvy. The same day that 21 Savage was released from ICE custody on bond.
- On February 28, BlocBoy JB was arrested for drug and weapons charges.

=== March ===
- On March 26, Billboard controversially removes Lil Nas X's breakout single "Old Town Road" from the Hot Country Songs chart for "not [embracing] enough elements of today's country music".
- On March 31, Nipsey Hussle was fatally shot outside his clothing store in Los Angeles, CA. He was 33 years old.

=== April ===
- On April 18, Cypress Hill receives a star in the walk of fame, making them the first Latino group to receive a star in the walk of fame.
- On April 21, Kanye West lead an Easter Sunday Service performance at Coachella, the group's first public performance.

=== May ===
- On May 18, it was revealed that Tyler, the Creator's ban in the United Kingdom had been lifted in an announcement for a London concert promoting his newly released album Igor. However, the show was cancelled due to overcrowding audience.

=== June ===
- On June 9, Bushwick Bill of the Geto Boys died at the age of 52, from pancreatic cancer.
- On June 20, the 2019 XXL Freshman Class was revealed, in which it included Gunna, DaBaby, Roddy Ricch, Cordae, Megan Thee Stallion, Lil Mosey, Blueface, Comethazine, Tierra Whack, YK Osiris, and Rico Nasty.

=== July ===
- On July 1, Lil Nas X's "Old Town Road" becomes the longest-running hip-hop song at number one on the Billboard Hot 100 after thirteen weeks, surpassing "Lose Yourself" by Eminem, "Boom Boom Pow" by the Black Eyed Peas, and "See You Again" by Wiz Khalifa featuring Charlie Puth, which had each achieved twelve weeks at number one.
- On July 23, Tay-K was sentenced to 55 years in prison on a murder charge for a 2016 robbery that left a man dead.

=== September ===
- On September 5, Nicki Minaj announces her retirement from making music to "have my family".
- On September 19, Dave wins the Mercury Prize, given to the best album released by a British musician each year, for his debut album Psychodrama.

=== October ===
- On October 2, Gucci Mane partnered with Gucci.
- On October 6, 2 Chainz partnered with Atlantic Records with his independent label The Real University.
- On October 15, Tyga signed a multi-million dollar deal to be with Columbia Records.
- On October 23, Lil Nas X's "Old Town Road" received an RIAA Diamond certification, 2019's first Diamond certification and the fastest song in history to reach this milestone.

=== November ===
- On November 6, Drake signed with the cannabis industry.
- On November 11, Bad Azz died four days earlier by the time he was arrested and jailed at Southwest Detention Center in Murrieta, California, on domestic violence charges.
- On November 13, Kodak Black is sentenced to three years and eight months prison time for lying about his criminal record while purchasing firearms.
- On November 21, French Montana was hospitalized due to stomach pains nausea and elevated heart rate.

=== December ===
- On December 8, Juice WRLD was pronounced dead after suffering a seizure in Chicago Midway Airport. According to TMZ, he died of a percocet overdose and swallowed all the pills so federal agents wouldn't find them on the jet.
- On December 18, 6ix9ine was sentenced to two years in jail after already serving 13 months because of racketeering and gang violence. However, he would get out of jail only months after originally being incarcerated due to his life-threatening asthma diagnosis.

== Released albums ==
=== January ===
Day	Artist(s)	Album	Record label(s)	Entering chart position
2	8Ball & MJG	Classic Pimpin	Push Management	
11	Comethazine	Bawskee 2	Alamo, Empire	Debuted at No. 61 on the Billboard 200
11	Watsky	Complaint	Steel Wool Media	
11	Wifisfuneral & Robb Banks	Conn3ct3d	Alamo	
11	Big K.R.I.T.	TDT	Multi Alumni	
15	Falz	Moral Instruction	Bahd Guys Records	
18	Blockhead	Free Sweatpants	Backwoodz Studioz	
18	Boondox	Liquor, Lies and Legacy	Majik Ninja Entertainment	
18	Future	The Wizrd	Freebandz, Epic	Debuted at No. 1 on the Billboard 200
18	Harry Mack	Contents Under Pressure	Self-released	
18	Malibu Ken (Aesop Rock & Tobacco)	Malibu Ken	Rhymesayers	Debuted at No. 176 on the Billboard 200
18	YNW Melly	We All Shine	Self-released	Debuted at No. 27 on the Billboard 200
23	Members Only	Members Only, Vol. 4	Bad Vibes Forever, Empire	Debuted at No. 23 on the Billboard 200
25	Boogie	Everythings for Sale	Shady, Interscope	Debuted at No. 28 on the Billboard 200
25	Boston George & Diego	Boston George & Diego	YJ Music, Def Jam	
25	Dendemann	Da Nich Für!	Vertigo, Paroli Beats	Debuted at No. 1 on Germany Charts
25	DJ Kay Slay	Hip Hop Frontline	Streetsweepers, Empire	
25	Dreezy	Big Dreez	Interscope	
25	K-Rino	Lightning Language (The 4-Piece #1)	Black Book International, SoSouth	
25	K-Rino	Then and Now (The 4-Piece #2)	Black Book International, SoSouth	
25	K-Rino	Three Weeks Later (The 4-Piece #3)	Black Book International, SoSouth	
25	K-Rino	The S-Project (The 4-Piece #4)	Black Book International, SoSouth	

=== February ===
Day	Artist(s)	Album	Record label(s)	Entering chart position
1	Fredo	Third Avenue	RCA Records	
1	G Herbo	Still Swervin	Machine Entertainment Group	Debuted at No. 41 on the Billboard 200
1	People Under the Stairs	Sincerely, the P	Piecelock 70	
8	AJ Tracey	AJ Tracey	Self-released	Debuted at No. 3 on the UK Albums Chart
8	Boston George & Slim Thug	Big Bad Boston and the Boss	Hogg Life	
8	Demrick	No Wasting Time	DEM	
8	Mars & Young Swizz	The Hangover	Mad Insanity Records, Empire	
8	Sean Price & Small Professor	86 Witness	Ruck Down, Duck Down, Coalmine Records	
8	Wiz Khalifa & Currensy	2009	Jet Life Recordings, Taylor Gang	Debuted at No. 35 on the Billboard 200
11	ASAP Ant	Addie Pitino	Self-released	
11	Bones	SparrowsCreek	TeamSESH	
13	Berner & Mozzy	Slimey Individualz	Bern One Ent., Mozzy Records, Empire	
13	Eem Triplin	Nowh3r3	Self-released	
14	Slim Thug	Suga Daddy Slim: On tha Prowl	Hogg Life	
15	Czarface & Ghostface Killah	Czarface Meets Ghostface	Silver Age	
15	Insane Clown Posse	Fearless Fred Fury	Psychopathic Records	Debuted at No. 44 on the Billboard 200
15	Papoose	Underrated	Honorable Records, Empire	
15	Struggle Jennings	The Widow's Son	Angels & Outlaws	
15	Wicca Phase Springs Eternal	Suffer On	Run for Cover Records	
22	Giggs	Big Bad...	No BS, Island Records	
22	Gorilla Zoe	I Am Atlanta 4ever	Hood Figga	
22	Gunna	Drip or Drown 2	YSL, 300	Debuted at No. 3 on the Billboard 200
22	Higher Brothers	Five Stars	88rising Records	
22	Hilltop Hoods	The Great Expanse	Universal	Debuted at No. 1 on the ARIA Australian Top 50 Albums
22	Lil Pump	Harverd Dropout	Tha Lights Global, Warner Bros.	Debuted at No. 7 on the Billboard 200
22	Night Lovell	Goodnight Lovell	SCPP	
22	Offset	Father of 4	Quality Control Music, Motown	Debuted at No. 4 on the Billboard 200
22	Smif-N-Wessun	The All	Duck Down Records	
22	The Dirtball	Skull Hollow	Throttle House Inc	
27	T-Pain	1Up	Cinematic Music Group	Debuted at No. 115 on the Billboard 200

=== March ===
Day	Artist(s)	Album	Record label(s)	Entering chart position
1	2 Chainz	Rap or Go to the League	Def Jam Recordings	Debuted at No. 4 on the Billboard 200
1	Blu & Oh No	A Long Red Hot Los Angeles Summer Night	Nature Sounds	
1	DaBaby	Baby on Baby	Interscope	Debuted at No. 25 on the Billboard 200
1	Eto & DJ Muggs	Hell's Roof	Soul Assassins	
1	Lil Skies	Shelby	Atlantic Records	Debuted at No. 5 on the Billboard 200
1	Little Simz	Grey Area	Age 101 Music	Debuted at No. 87 on the UK Albums Chart
1	Myka 9 & Adriatic	In Motion	Automatic Records	
2	Nugz	Stashbox Chronicles	Loretta Records	
7	Bullies (Denmark Vessey, DrxQuinnx & Azarias)	いじめっ子	Fxckrxp Records	
8	Dave	Psychodrama	Neighbourhood Recordings	Debuted at No. 1 on the UK Albums Chart
8	Juice Wrld	Death Race for Love	Grade A Productions, Interscope	Debuted at No. 1 on the Billboard 200
8	Kerser	Lifestyle	ABK, Warner Music Australia	Debuted at No. 2 on the ARIA Australian Top 50 Albums
14	Lil Gotit	Crazy But It's True	Alamo Records, Empire	
14	Nav	Brown Boy	XO	
15	Chief Keef & Zaytoven	GloToven	Glo Gang, RBC Records	Debuted at No. 153 on the Billboard 200
15	Dizzy Wright	Nobody Cares, Work Harder	Dizzy Wright, Empire	
15	Scarlxrd	Infinity	Lxrd Records, Island	
17	Lil' Flip	La Clover Nostra: Clover Gang	GT Digital, Lil' Flip	
18	Frenzo Harami	Chaabian Boyz: Volume 1	Dubba Squad	
22	Don Trip	Don't Feed the Guerillas	MRVL Recording Group	
22	Nav	Bad Habits	XO, Republic Records	Debuted at No. 1 on the Billboard 200
22	Rich the Kid	The World Is Yours 2	Interscope, Rich Forever Music	Debuted at No. 4 on the Billboard 200
29	Birdman & Juvenile	Just Another Gangsta	Cash Money Records	
29	Boosie Badazz	Badazz 3.5	Lil Boosie Music	
29	Ill Bill & Stu Bangas	Cannibal Hulk	Uncle Howie Records	
29	MED	Child of the Jungle	Bang Ya Head	
29	Quelle Chris	Guns	Mello Music Group	
29	Yelawolf	Trunk Muzik 3	Slumerican, Shady Records, Interscope	Debuted at No. 28 on the Billboard 200

=== April ===
Day	Artist(s)	Album	Record label(s)	Entering chart position
5	JellyRoll	Whiskey Sessions II	Jingle Punks Music	
12	Anderson .Paak	Ventura	Aftermath Entertainment	Debuted at No. 4 on the Billboard 200
12	Caleb Steph	Bellwood Product	Dirty Hit, INgrooves	
12	Iann Dior	Nothings Ever Good Enough	10k	
12	KSI and Randolph	New Age	Self-released	Debuted at No. 17 on the UK Albums Chart
12	Riff Raff	Pink Python	Jody Highroller Ent.	
12	Vinnie Paz & Tragedy Khadafi	Camouflage Regime	Iron Tusk Music, Enemy Soil	
15	JellyRoll	Crosses and Crossroads	War Dog	
19	03 Greedo	Still Summer in the Projects	Alamo Records	
19	Erick Sermon	Vernia	Def Squad	
19	Lizzo	Cuz I Love You	Nice Life, Atlantic Records	Debuted at No. 6 on the Billboard 200
19	Loyle Carner	Not Waving, But Drowning	AMF Records, Virgin EMI Records	Debuted at No. 3 on the UK Albums Chart
19	Pivot Gang	You Can't Sit with Us	Pivot Gang	
19	Tech N9ne	N9NA	Strange Music, RBC, INgrooves	Debuted at No. 34 on the Billboard 200
19	Your Old Droog	It Wasn't Even Close	Gogul Mogul, Mongoloid Banks	
20	Bun B & Statik Selektah	TrillStatik	ShowOff Records, II Trill Enterprises	
20	Kokane	Finger Roll	Bud E. Boy Entertainment	
20	Upchurch	Creeker II	Redneck Nation Records	Debuted at No. 66 on the Billboard 200
20	Wiz Khalifa	Fly Times Vol. 1: The Good Fly Young	Taylor Gang, Rostrum Records, Atlantic Records	Debuted at No. 70 on the Billboard 200
25	Kevin Abstract	Arizona Baby	Question Everything, RCA Records	Debuted at No. 53 on the Billboard 200
25	OMB Peezy	Preacher to the Streets	Sick Wid It Records	
26	Madchild	Demons	Battle Axe	
26	Pete Rock	Return of the SP1200	Tru Soul Records	
26	Rico Nasty & Kenny Beats	Anger Management	Sugar Trap	
26	Schoolboy Q	Crash Talk	Top Dawg Entertainment, Interscope	Debuted at No. 3 on the Billboard 200
26	Twiztid	Generation Nightmare	Majik Ninja Entertainment	Debuted at No. 51 on the Billboard 200
26	Various artists	For the Throne (Music Inspired by the HBO Series Game of Thrones)	Columbia	Debuted at No. 37 on the Billboard 200

=== May ===
Day	Artist(s)	Album	Record label(s)	Entering chart position
3	Asian Da Brat	Unfuccwithable	1017 Eskimo, Alamo Records	
3	PnB Rock	TrapStar Turnt PopStar	Atlantic, WEA International	Debuted at No. 4 on the Billboard 200
3	Styles P	S.P. The GOAT: Ghost of All Time	The Phantom Entertainment LLC, Empire	
3	TOBi	STILL	Same Plate Entertainment, Sony Music	
3	Bones	UnderTheWillowTree	TeamSESH	
5	Berner	El Chivo	Bern One Entertainment	
5	Suga Free	The Resurrection	Buss Clinic LLC	
7	Kutt Calhoun	Truth Be Told	Black Gold Entertainment	
10	Diamond D	The Diam Piece 2	Dymond Mine Records	
10	DJ Paul	Power, Pleasure & Painful Things	Scale-A-Ton Ent.	
10	Logic	Confessions of a Dangerous Mind	Visionary Music Group, Def Jam Recordings	Debuted at No. 1 on the Billboard 200
10	Quando Rondo	From the Neighborhood to the Stage	Never Broke Again, Atlantic	Debuted at No. 29 on the Billboard 200
10	Smokepurpp	Lost Planet 2.0	Alamo Records	
17	Curren$y & Statik Selektah	Gran Turismo	Jet Life, Showoff, Empire	
17	Digga D	Double Tap Diaries	CGM Records	Debuted at No. 11 on the UK Albums Chart
17	DJ Khaled	Father of Asahd	We the Best, Epic	Debuted at No. 2 on the Billboard 200
17	Injury Reserve	Injury Reserve	Loma Vista Recordings	Debuted at No. 14 on the Billboard Heatseekers Albums
17	Megan Thee Stallion	Fever	1501 Certified Ent, 300	Debuted at No. 10 on the Billboard 200
17	Slowthai	Nothing Great About Britain	Method Records	Debuted at No. 9 on the UK Albums Chart
17	Tyler, the Creator	Igor	Columbia	Debuted at No. 1 on the Billboard 200
21	PlayThatBoiZay	Year 300	VIP$HIT	
24	Beast Coast	Escape from New York	Columbia	Debuted at No. 29 on the Billboard 200
24	Collie Buddz	Hybrid	Harper Digital	
24	Moneybagg Yo	43va Heartless	N-Less Entertainment	Debuted at No. 4 on the Billboard 200
24	$uicideboy$ & Travis Barker	Live Fast Die Whenever	G*59 Records	
24	YG	4Real 4Real	4Hunnid Records, Def Jam Recordings	Debuted at No. 7 on the Billboard 200
31	Denzel Curry	Zuu	Loma Vista Recordings	Debuted at No. 32 on the Billboard 200
31	Jim Jones	El Capo	Vamplife, Empire	Debuted at No. 114 on the Billboard 200
31	Philthy Rich	East Oakland Legend	SCMMLLC, Empire	
31	Skepta	Ignorance Is Bliss	Boy Better Know	Debuted at No. 2 on the UK Albums Chart
31	Yung Gravy	Sensational	Republic	Debuted at No. 52 on the Billboard 200

=== June ===
Day	Artist(s)	Album	Record label(s)	Entering chart position
7	Casey Veggies	Organic	Peas & Carrots International	
7	Che Noir & 38 Spesh	The Thrill of the Hunt 2	TCF	
7	Future	Save Me	Epic, Freebandz	Debuted at No. 5 on the Billboard 200
7	MoStack	Stacko	MizerMillion Entertainment, Virgin, EMI	Debuted at No. 3 on the UK Albums Chart
7	Polo G	Die a Legend	Polo G, Columbia	Debuted at No. 6 on the Billboard 200
7	Tee Grizzley	Scriptures	Grizzly Gang, 300	Debuted at No. 20 on the Billboard 200
7	Tyga	Legendary	Last Kings, Empire	Debuted at No. 17 on the Billboard 200
12	GoldLink	Diaspora	Squaaash Club, RCA	Debuted at No. 77 on the Billboard 200
14	Lil Keed	Long Live Mexico	300 Entertainment, YSL Records	Debuted at No. 26 on the Billboard 200
14	Your Old Droog	Transportation	Mongoloid Banks	
21	Benny the Butcher	The Plugs I Met	Black Soprano Family	
21	B.o.B	Southmatic	No Genre, The Dispensary	
21	Gucci Mane	Delusions of Grandeur	1017, Atlantic	Debuted at No. 7 on the Billboard 200
21	K Camp	Wavy 2 Kritical	RARE Sound, Interscope, Empire	
21	Lil Nas X	7	Columbia	Debuted at No. 2 on the Billboard 200
21	Trina	The One	Rockstarr Music Group	Debuted at No. 126 on the Billboard 200
28	Chris Brown	Indigo	RCA	Debuted at No. 1 on the Billboard 200
28	Freddie Gibbs & Madlib	Bandana	Keep Cool, RCA	Debuted at No. 21 on the Billboard 200
28	Mustard	Perfect Ten	10 Summers, Interscope	Debuted at No. 8 on the Billboard 200

=== July ===
Day	Artist(s)	Album	Record label(s)	Entering chart position
5	Dreamville	Revenge of the Dreamers III	Dreamville Records, Interscope	Debuted at No. 1 on the Billboard 200
5	Jaden Smith	Erys	MSFTSMusic, Roc Nation	Debuted at No. 12 on the Billboard 200
5	Machine Gun Kelly	Hotel Diablo	Bad Boy, Interscope	Debuted at No. 5 on the Billboard 200
12	Big K.R.I.T.	K.R.I.T. Iz Here	Multi Alumni, BMG	Debuted at No. 16 on the Billboard 200
12	Inspectah Deck	Chamber No. 9	Music Generation Corp.	
12	Kool Keith	Keith	Mello Music Group	
19	Iggy Azalea	In My Defense	Bad Dreams, Empire	Debuted at No. 50 on the Billboard 200
19	Jasiah	Jasiah I Am	Atlantic	
19	Maxo Kream	Brandon Banks	Big Persona, 88 Classic, RCA Records	
19	Nas	The Lost Tapes 2	Mass Appeal, Def Jam	Debuted at No. 10 on the Billboard 200
24	Yung Bans	Misunderstood	Freebandz	
26	Anybody Killa	Tampon Juice	Native World Inc.	
26	Chance the Rapper	The Big Day	Self-released	Debuted at No. 2 on the Billboard 200
26	Comethazine	Bawskee 3.5	Alamo, Empire	Debuted at No. 53 on the Billboard 200
26	E-40	Practice Makes Paper	Heavy on the Grind	Debuted at No. 65 on the Billboard 200
26	NF	The Search	Capitol CMG, NF Real Music LLC	Debuted at No. 1 on the Billboard 200
26	Rich Brian	The Sailor	88rising	Debuted at No. 62 on the Billboard 200
26	Spice 1	Platinum OG	Elder Entertainment	
26	YBN Cordae	The Lost Boy	YBN Records, Atlantic Records	Debuted at No. 13 on the Billboard 200
26	BJ the Chicago Kid	1123	Motown	
26	UBI	Under Bad Influence	Strange Music, RBC, Ingrooves	
26	Slim Thug	King of the Nawf	Hogg Life, SoSouth	
28	Big Que	The Madness Is Out EP	Madness Records	

=== August ===
Day	Artist(s)	Album	Record label(s)	Entering chart position
2	Lil Durk	Love Songs 4 the Streets 2	Alamo Records	Debuted at No. 4 on the Billboard 200
2	Saint Dog	Bozo	Suburban Noize, Force 5 Records	
2	Tobi Lou	Live on Ice	ArtClub, Empire	
9	Blueface	Dirtbag	Cash Money Records	Debuted at No. 48 on the Billboard 200
9	Murs and 9th Wonder	The Iliad is Dead and the Odyssey is Over	Self-released	
9	Rick Ross	Port of Miami 2	Maybach Music, Epic	Debuted at No. 2 on the Billboard 200
9	Trippie Redd	!	Caroline, 10k	Debuted at No. 3 on the Billboard 200
9	Ugly God	Bumps & Bruises	Asylum Records	Debuted at No. 46 on the Billboard 200
13	PlayThatBoiZay	Vipzhit	Self-released	
16	A$AP Ferg	Floor Seats	RCA	Debuted at No. 50 on the Billboard 200
16	Snoop Dogg	I Wanna Thank Me	Doggy Style, Empire	Debuted at No. 76 on the Billboard 200
16	Quality Control Music	Control the Streets, Volume 2	Quality Control Music, Motown, Capitol	Debuted at No. 3 on the Billboard 200
16	Young Thug	So Much Fun	YSL Records, 300 Entertainment	Debuted at No. 1 on the Billboard 200
	Sematary & Ghost Mountain	Grave House	Self-released	
20	Little Brother	May the Lord Watch	Imagine Nation Music, For Members Only, Empire	
23	Brockhampton	Ginger	Question Everything, RCA	Debuted at No. 3 on the Billboard 200
23	Jeezy	TM104: The Legend of the Snowman	CTE, Def Jam Recordings	Debuted at No. 5 on the Billboard 200
23	Jidenna	85 to Africa	Wondaland, Epic Records	
23	Missy Elliott	Iconology	Atlantic	Debuted at No. 24 on the Billboard 200
23	Obie Trice	The Fifth	Black Market Entertainment	
23	Rapsody	Eve	Roc Nation	Debuted at No. 76 on the Billboard 200
23	Trae tha Truth	Exhale	ABN, Empire	
30	Alchemist	Yacht Rock 2	ALC	
30	Common	Let Love	Loma Vista	Debuted at No. 118 on the Billboard 200
30	Kano	Hoodies All Summer	Parlophone, Bigger Picture Music	Debuted at No. 8 on the UK Albums Chart
30	Joell Ortiz	Monday	Mello	
30	Lil Tecca	We Love You Tecca	Republic Records	Debuted at No. 4 on the Billboard 200
30	Bones	KickingTheBucket	TeamSESH	

=== September ===
Day	Artist(s)	Album	Record label(s)	Entering chart position
4	IDK	Is He Real	Warner Music Group	
6	EarthGang	Mirrorland	Dreamville, Interscope, Spillage Village	Debuted at No. 40 on the Billboard 200
6	Ghostface Killah	Ghostface Killahs	Music Generation Corp.	
6	Post Malone	Hollywood's Bleeding	Republic	Debuted at No. 1 on the Billboard 200
6	Ras Kass	Soul on Ice 2	Mello Music Group	
12	Bizzy Bone	Carbon Monoxide	Bizzy Bone	
13	Young Noble	3rd Eye View	Outlaw Recordz	
13	JPEGMafia	All My Heroes Are Cornballs	EQT Records	Debuted at No. 105 on the Billboard 200
13	Sampa the Great	The Return	Ninja Tune	
20	Skyzoo & Pete Rock	Retropolitan	Mello Music Group	
20	The Gatlin and Yukmouth	Double Dragon	Tal Boi Entertainment	
24	Ryan Upchurch	Parachute	Redneck Nation	Debuted at No. 52 on the Billboard 200
27	Kevin Gates	I'm Him	Bread Winners' Association	Debuted at No. 4 on the Billboard 200
27	DaBaby	Kirk	Billion Dollar Baby, Interscope	Debuted at No. 1 on the Billboard 200
27	Pitbull	Libertad 548	Mr. 305 Records	
27	Young M.A	Herstory in the Making	M.A Music, 3D	Debuted at No. 16 on the Billboard 200
27	Joey Cool	Old Habits Die Hard	Strange Music, RBC, Ingrooves	

=== October ===
Day	Artist(s)	Album	Record label(s)	Entering chart position
4	Akon	El Negreeto	Akonik Label Group	
4	Compton's Most Wanted	Gangsta Bizness	Bluestamp Music Group	
4	Danny Brown	U Know What I'm Sayin?	Warp	Debuted at No. 134 on the Billboard 200
4	Peewee Longway & Money Man	Long Money	Black Circle, MPA BandCamp, Empire	Debuted at No. 45 on the Billboard 200
4	Radamiz	Nothing Changes If Nothing Changes	Payday, Ultra	
9	Father	Hu$band EP	Awful Records, RCA	
11	Curren$y, Trademark & Young Roddy	Plan of Attack	Babygrande	
11	Lil' Kim	9	Queen Bee, eOne Music	
11	Lil Tjay	True 2 Myself	Columbia	Debuted at No. 5 on the Billboard 200
11	Wale	Wow... That's Crazy	Maybach, Warner	Debuted at No. 7 on the Billboard 200
11	YoungBoy Never Broke Again	Al YoungBoy 2	Never Broke Again, Atlantic	Debuted at No. 1 on the Billboard 200
11	YK Osiris	The Golden Child	Def Jam	Debuted at No. 90 on the Billboard 200
17	Homeboy Sandman	Dusty	Mello Music Group	
17	Kool Keith	Computer Technology	Junkadelic Music	
18	BEAM	95	BE I AM, Epic	
18	Black Moon	Rise of da Moon	Duck Down Music	
18	Mavi	Let the Sun Talk	MAVI	
18	Smoke DZA, Benny the Butcher & Pete Rock	Statue of Limitations	RFC Music Group, Cinematic	
18	Clipping.	There Existed an Addiction to Blood	Sub Pop	
18	G-Eazy	Scary Nights EP	RVG, BPG, RCA	Debuted at No. 27 on the Billboard 200
18	Gucci Mane	Woptober II	1017, Atlantic	Debuted at No. 9 on the Billboard 200
25	Akon	Akonda	Akonik Label Group	
25	Kanye West	Jesus Is King	GOOD, Def Jam	Debuted at No. 1 on the Billboard 200
25	Quin NFN	4Nun	10K Projects	
31	Lil' Flip	The Art of Freestyle 2	Clover G, SoSouth	
31	Uncommon Nasa & Kount Fif	City As School	Man Bites Dog	

=== November ===
Day	Artist(s)	Album	Record label(s)	Entering chart position
1	Earl Sweatshirt	Feet of Clay	Tan Cressida, Warner	Debuted at No. 102 on the Billboard 200
1	Gang Starr	One of the Best Yet	To the Top, Gang Starr Enterprises	Debuted at No. 82 on the Billboard 200
1	Krept & Konan	Revenge Is Sweet	Virgin	
1	Rod Wave	Ghetto Gospel	Alamo	Debuted at No. 10 on the Billboard 200
1	Stalley	Reflection of Self: The Head Trip	Nature Sounds	
1	Westside Gunn	Hitler Wears Hermes 7	Griselda Records, Empire	
1	Yelawolf	Ghetto Cowboy	Slumerican	Debuted at No. 76 on the Billboard 200
1	Brother Ali	Secrets & Escapes	Rhymesayers Entertainment	
8	Dave East	Survival	From The Dirt, Mass Appeal, Def Jam	Debuted at No. 11 on the Billboard 200
8	Doja Cat	Hot Pink	Kemosabe, RCA	Debuted at No. 93 on the Billboard 200
8	Iann Dior	Industry Plant	10k	Debuted at No. 44 on the Billboard 200
8	Jacquees	King of R&B	Cash Money, Republic	Debuted at No. 20 on the Billboard 200
8	Lil Mosey	Certified Hitmaker	Interscope Records	Debuted at No. 12 on the Billboard 200
8	Maez301	Maez301	Strange Music, RBC, Ingrooves	
15	DJ Shadow	Our Pathetic Age	Mass Appeal Records	
15	Lil Peep	Everybody's Everything	Columbia	Debuted at No. 14 on the Billboard 200
15	PlayThatBoiZay	Nocturnal	Self-released	
15	Styles P	Presence	The Phantom Entertainment LLC, Empire	
15	Tory Lanez	Chixtape 5	Mad Love, Interscope	Debuted at No. 2 on the Billboard 200
17	Frenzo Harami	Gundeh Paseh	Dubba Squad	
22	03 Greedo & Kenny Beats	Netflix & Deal	Alamo, Empire	
22	Flipp Dinero	Love for Guala	We The Best, Cinematic, Epic	Debuted at No. 132 on the Billboard 200
22	Slaine	One Day	AR Classic Records	
22	Trippie Redd	A Love Letter to You 4	Caroline, TenThousand Projects	Debuted at No. 1 on the Billboard 200
22	YNW Melly	Melly vs. Melvin	300	Debuted at No. 8 on the Billboard 200
22	24kGoldn	DROPPED OUTTA COLLEGE	Columbia	Debuted at No. 122 on the Billboard 200
28	Paul Wall & Statik Selektah	Give Thanks EP	Showoff	
29	Blac Youngsta	Church on Sunday	Heavy Camp, Collective Music Group, Epic	Debuted at No. 91 on the Billboard 200
29	Fabolous	Summertime Shootout 3: Coldest Summer Ever	Desert Storm, Def Jam	Debuted at No. 7 on the Billboard 200
29	Rittz	Put a Crown on It	CNT Records	
29	The Game	Born 2 Rap	Prolific Records, eOne	Debuted at No. 19 on the Billboard 200
29	Griselda	WWCD	Griselda Records, Shady, Interscope	
29	Smoke DZA & Curren$y	Prestige Worldwide	RFC Music Group, Jet Life, Cinematic	
29	Lil' Flip	The Music Machine	GT Digital, Clover G	
29	Bones	IFeelLikeDirt	TeamSESH	

=== December ===
Day	Artist(s)	Album	Record label(s)	Entering chart position
2	Roc Marciano	Marcielago	Marci Enterprises	
2	Iggy Azalea	Wicked Lips	Bad Dreams, Empire	
5	Eem Triplin	No More Tears	Self-released	
6	Fat Joe & Dre	Family Ties	RNG, Terror Squad, Empire	Debuted at No. 81 on the Billboard 200
6	French Montana	Montana	Coke Boys, Bad Boy, Epic	Debuted at No. 25 on the Billboard 200
6	Max B	House Money	PhaseOne Network	
6	Roddy Ricch	Please Excuse Me For Being Antisocial	Atlantic	Debuted at No. 1 on the Billboard 200
6	XXXTentacion	Bad Vibes Forever	Bad Vibes Forever, Empire	Debuted at No. 5 on the Billboard 200
10	Bizarre	Rufus	No Money Records	
11	Only The Family & Lil Durk	Family over Everything	Only the Family, Alamo, Interscope	Debuted at No. 93 on the Billboard 200
13	Atmosphere	Whenever	Rhymesayers	
13	KXNG Crooked & Bronze Nazareth	Gravitas	Fat Beats, Holy Toledo Productions	
13	KAYTRANADA	Bubba	KAYTRANADA, RCA	Debuted at No. 56 on the Billboard 200
13	Rich Homie Quan	Coma	RAIS	
13	Robb Bank$	Road to Falconia	Empire	
13	Smokepurpp	Deadstar 2	Alamo, Interscope	Debuted at No. 137 on the Billboard 200
13	Stormzy	Heavy is the Head	#Merky Records	
13	YFN Lucci	HIStory	Think It's A Game Entertainment, Warner	Debuted at No. 152 on the Billboard 200
13	K-Rino	Mind Vision	Black Book International, SoSouth	
18	Various artists	1800 Seconds Vol.2: Curated by Future	UnitedMasters	
20	Cam'ron	Purple Haze 2	Killa Entertainment	Debuted at No. 180 on the Billboard 200
20	Gucci Mane	East Atlanta Santa 3	Guwop, Atlantic	Debuted at No. 68 on the Billboard 200
20	Sean Price & Lil' Fame	Price of Fame	Duck Down Music	
20	Too $hort	The Vault	Dangerous Music, Empire	
20	Curren$y	Back at Burnie's	Jet Life, Empire	
23	Your Old Droog	Jewelry	Mongoloid Banks	
27	JackBoys and Travis Scott	JackBoys	Cactus Jack, Grand Hustle, Epic	Debuted at No. 1 on the Billboard 200
27	Jme	Grime MC	Boy Better Know	

== Highest-charting songs ==
=== United States ===
Hip hop songs from any year which charted in the 2019 Top 40 of the Billboard Hot 100
Song	Artist	Project	Peak position
"Circles"	Post Malone	Hollywood's Bleeding	1
"Highest in the Room"	Travis Scott	JackBoys	1
"Old Town Road"	Lil Nas X featuring Billy Ray Cyrus	7	1
"Sunflower"	Post Malone and Swae Lee	Spider-Man: Into the Spider-Verse	1
"Truth Hurts"	Lizzo	Cuz I Love You	1
"Wow."	Post Malone	Hollywood's Bleeding	2
"Good as Hell"	Lizzo	Coconut Oil	3
"Goodbyes"	Post Malone featuring Young Thug	Hollywood's Bleeding	3
"Please Me"	Cardi B and Bruno Mars	—N/a	3
"Middle Child"	J. Cole	Revenge of the Dreamers III	4
"Ransom"	Lil Tecca	We Love You Tecca	4
"Roxanne"	Arizona Zervas	—N/a	4
"Futsal Shuffle 2020"	Lil Uzi Vert	Eternal Atake	5
"Homicide"	Logic featuring Eminem	Confessions of a Dangerous Mind	5
"Panini"	Lil Nas X	7	5
"Follow God"	Kanye West	Jesus Is King	7
"Money in the Grave"	Drake featuring Rick Ross	The Best in the World Pack	7
"Suge"	DaBaby	Baby on Baby	7
"Take What You Want"	Post Malone featuring Ozzy Osbourne and Travis Scott	Hollywood's Bleeding	8
"Thotiana"	Blueface	Famous Cryp	8
"Bandit"	Juice Wrld and YoungBoy Never Broke Again	Death Race for Love	10
"Bop"	DaBaby	Kirk	11
"Hot"	Young Thug featuring Gunna	So Much Fun	11
"Hot Girl Summer"	Megan Thee Stallion featuring Nicki Minaj and Ty Dolla Sign	—N/a	11
"Pop Out"	Polo G featuring Lil Tjay	Die a Legend	11
"A Lot"	21 Savage featuring J. Cole	I Am > I Was	12
"The London"	Young Thug featuring J. Cole and Travis Scott	So Much Fun	12
"Earfquake"	Tyler, the Creator	Igor	13
"Intro"	DaBaby	Kirk	13
"Murder on My Mind"	YNW Melly	I Am You	14
"Hollywood's Bleeding"	Post Malone	Hollywood's Bleeding	15
"Enemies"	Post Malone featuring DaBaby	Hollywood's Bleeding	16
"Press"	Cardi B	—N/a	16
"Closed on Sunday"	Kanye West	Jesus Is King	17
"Saint-Tropez"	Post Malone	Hollywood's Bleeding	18
"Selah"	Kanye West	Jesus Is King	19
"Wish Wish"	DJ Khaled featuring Cardi B and 21 Savage	Father of Asahd	19
"Die for Me"	Post Malone featuring Future and Halsey	Hollywood's Bleeding	20
"Leave Me Alone"	Flipp Dinero	Love for Guala	20
"Megatron"	Nicki Minaj	—N/a	20
"Baby"	Lil Baby and DaBaby	Control the Streets, Volume 2	21
"Higher"	DJ Khaled featuring Nipsey Hussle and John Legend	Father of Asahd	21
"My Type"	Saweetie	Icy	21
"Vibez"	DaBaby	Kirk	21
"On Chill"	Wale featuring Jeremih	Wow... That's Crazy	22
"On the Road"	Post Malone featuring Meek Mill and Lil Baby	Hollywood's Bleeding	22
"Rodeo"	Lil Nas X and Cardi B	7	22
"On God"	Kanye West	Jesus Is King	23
"Pure Water"	Mustard and Migos	Perfect Ten	23
"Act Up"	City Girls	Girl Code	26
"Racks in the Middle"	Nipsey Hussle featuring Roddy Ricch and Hit-Boy	—N/a	26
"Look Back at It"	A Boogie wit da Hoodie	Hoodie SZN	27
"Robbery"	Juice Wrld	Death Race for Love	27
"Sanguine Paradise"	Lil Uzi Vert	—N/a	28
"Toes"	DaBaby featuring Lil Baby and Moneybagg Yo	Kirk	28
"A Thousand Bad Times"	Post Malone	Hollywood's Bleeding	29
"Legends"	Juice Wrld	Too Soon..	29
"Twerk"	City Girls featuring Cardi B	Girl Code	29
"Envy Me"	Calboy	Wildboy	31
"Bad Bad Bad"	Young Thug featuring Lil Baby	So Much Fun	32
"Everything We Need"	Kanye West featuring Ty Dolla Sign and Ant Clemons	Jesus Is King	33
"I'm Gonna Be"	Post Malone	Hollywood's Bleeding	33
"223's"	YNW Melly featuring 9lokkNine	Melly vs. Melvin	34
"Staring at the Sun"	Post Malone featuring SZA	Hollywood's Bleeding	34
"Omertà"	Drake	The Best in the World Pack	35
"Cash Shit"	Megan Thee Stallion featuring DaBaby	Fever	36
"God Is"	Kanye West	Jesus Is King	36
"Shotta Flow"	NLE Choppa	Cottonwood	36
"Allergic"	Post Malone	Hollywood's Bleeding	37
"Camelot"	NLE Choppa	Top Shotta	37
"Use This Gospel"	Kanye West featuring Clipse and Kenny G	Jesus Is King	37
"Hear Me Calling"	Juice Wrld	Death Race for Love	38
"Keanu Reeves"	Logic	Confessions of a Dangerous Mind	38
"Swervin"	A Boogie wit da Hoodie featuring 6ix9ine	Hoodie SZN	38
"Clout"	Offset featuring Cardi B	Father of 4	39
"Gold Roses"	Rick Ross featuring Drake	Port of Miami 2	39
"I"	Lil Skies	Shelby	39
"Backin' It Up"	Pardison Fontaine featuring Cardi B	Under8ed	40

=== United Kingdom ===
Hip hop songs from any year which charted in the 2019 Top 10 of the UK Singles Chart
Song	Artist	Project	Peak position
"Own It"	Stormzy featuring Ed Sheeran and Burna Boy	Heavy Is the Head	1
"Vossi Bop"	Stormzy	Heavy Is the Head	1
"Taste (Make It Shake)"	Aitch	AitcH20	2
"Ladbroke Grove"	AJ Tracey	AJ Tracey	3
"Crown"	Stormzy	Heavy Is the Head	4
"Must Be"	J Hus	Big Conspiracy	5
"Location"	Dave featuring Burna Boy	Psychodrama	6
"Audacity"	Stormzy featuring Headie One	Heavy Is the Head	6
"18Hunna"	Headie One featuring Dave	Music x Road	6
"Kiesha & Becky"	Russ Millions and Tion Wayne	—N/a	7
"Options"	NSG featuring Tion Wayne	Roots	7
"So High"	MIST featuring Fredo	—N/a	7
"Fashion Week"	Steel Banglez featuring AJ Tracey and MoStack	—N/a	7
"Disaster"	Dave featuring J Hus	Psychodrama	8
"Buss Down"	Aitch featuring ZieZie	AitcH20	8
"Strike a Pose"	Young T & Bugsey featuring Aitch	Plead the 5th	9
"Streatham"	Dave	Psychodrama	9
"Gun Lean"	Russ Millions	—N/a	9
"Lessons"	Stormzy	Heavy Is the Head	9
"Down Like That"	KSI featuring Rick Ross, Lil Baby and S-X	Dissimulation	10

== Highest first-week consumption ==
List of albums with the highest first-week consumption (sales + streaming + track equivalent), as of December 2019 in the United States
Number	Album	Artist	1st-week consumption	1st-week position	Refs
1	Hollywood's Bleeding	Post Malone	489,000	1	
2	Jesus Is King	Kanye West	264,000	1	
3	Igor	Tyler, the Creator	165,000	1	
4	Death Race for Love	Juice Wrld	165,000	1	
5	Kirk	DaBaby	145,000	1	
6	Father of Asahd	DJ Khaled	136,000	2	
7	So Much Fun	Young Thug	131,000	1	
8	The Search	NF	130,000	1	
9	The Wizrd	Future	125,000	1	
10	Revenge of the Dreamers III	Dreamville & J. Cole	115,000	1	

== All critically reviewed albums ranked ==
=== Metacritic ===
Number	Artist	Album	Average score	Number of reviews	Reference
1	Little Simz	Grey Area	91	15 reviews	
2	Dave	Psychodrama	90	10 reviews	
3	Rapsody	Eve	90	8 reviews	
4	Freddie Gibbs & Madlib	Bandana	88	23 reviews	
5	Little Brother	May the Lord Watch	86	5 reviews	
6	JPEGMafia	All My Heroes Are Cornballs	85	14 reviews	
7	Denzel Curry	Zuu	85	8 reviews	
8	Lizzo	Cuz I Love You	84	24 reviews	
9	Maxo Kream	Brandon Banks	84	5 reviews	
10	Krept & Konan	Revenge Is Sweet	84	5 reviews	
11	Jme	Grime MC	84	4 reviews	
12	Danny Brown	U Know What I'm Sayin?	83	21 reviews	
13	Sampa the Great	The Return	83	9 reviews	
14	Stormzy	Heavy Is the Head	82	17 reviews	
15	Slowthai	Nothing Great About Britain	82	15 reviews	
16	2 Chainz	Rap or Go to the League	82	8 reviews	
17	Westside Boogie	Everythings for Sale	82	7 reviews	
18	GoldLink	Diaspora	82	6 reviews	
19	Giggs	BIG BAD	82	6 reviews	
20	The Game	Born 2 Rap	82	4 reviews	
21	Tyler, the Creator	IGOR	81	18 reviews	
22	AJ Tracey	AJ Tracey	81	9 reviews	
23	Megan Thee Stallion	Fever	81	9 reviews	
24	Cordae	The Lost Boy	81	5 reviews	
25	Quelle Chris	Guns	81	4 reviews	
26	Skepta	Ignorance Is Bliss	79	14 reviews	
27	Kano	Hoodies All Summer	79	13 reviews	
28	Young Thug	So Much Fun	79	10 reviews	
29	Post Malone	Hollywood's Bleeding	79	10 reviews	
30	Rico Nasty & Kenny Beats	Anger Management	79	4 reviews	
31	EarthGang	Mirrorland	77	8 reviews	
32	03 Greedo	Still Summer in the Projects	77	5 reviews	
33	Malibu Ken	Malibu Ken	76	7 reviews	
34	Gunna	Drip or Drown 2	76	6 reviews	
35	Kevin Abstract	ARIZONA BABY	76	4 reviews	
36	Gucci Mane	Woptober II	76	4 reviews	
37	Brockhampton	GINGER	75	12 reviews	
38	Injury Reserve	Injury Reserve	75	7 reviews	
39	DaBaby	KIRK	74	7 reviews	
40	clipping.	There Existed an Addiction to Blood	73	11 reviews	
41	Lil Durk	Love Songs 4 the Streets 2	73	4 reviews	
42	Offset	Father of 4	72	8 reviews	
43	Czarface & Ghostface Killah	Czarface Meets Ghostface	72	7 reviews	
44	Roddy Ricch	Please Excuse Me for Being Antisocial	72	4 reviews	
45	Homeboy Sandman	Dusty	72	4 reviews	
46	Chance the Rapper	The Big Day	71	21 reviews	
47	Gang Starr	One of the Best Yet	71	12 reviews	
48	Ghostface Killah	Ghostface Killahs	71	4 reviews	
49	Future	The Wizrd	70	12 reviews	
50	Loyle Carner	Not Waving, but Drowning	70	12 reviews	
51	YG	4Real 4Real	70	8 reviews	
52	Common	Let Love	70	8 reviews	
53	Jidenna	85 to Africa	70	4 reviews	
54	DJ Shadow	Our Pathetic Age	69	13 reviews	
55	ScHoolboy Q	CrasH Talk	69	7 reviews	
56	Big K.R.I.T.	K.R.I.T. Iz Here	69	4 reviews	
57	Fredo	Third Avenue	68	4 reviews	
58	Rick Ross	Port of Miami 2	67	7 reviews	
59	03 Greedo & Kenny Beats	Netflix & Deal	67	5 reviews	
60	Rich the Kid	The World Is Yours 2	67	4 reviews	
61	Logic	Confessions of a Dangerous Mind	65	4 reviews	
62	Juice Wrld	Death Race for Love	61	11 reviews	
63	DJ Khaled	Father of Asahd	59	7 reviews	
64	Trippie Redd	!	59	6 reviews	
65	NF	The Search	58	6 reviews	
66	Jaden	ERYS	58	5 reviews	
67	XXXTENTACION	Bad Vibes Forever	55	6 reviews	
68	Kanye West	Jesus Is King	53	25 reviews	
69	NAV	Bad Habits	52	4 reviews	
70	Lil Pump	Harverd Dropout	46	8 reviews	
71	Iggy Azalea	In My Defense	39	4 reviews	

=== AnyDecentMusic? ===
Number	Artist	Album	Average score	Number of reviews	Reference
1	Dave	Psychodrama	8.8	8 reviews	
2	Little Simz	Grey Area	8.5	15 reviews	
3	JPEGMafia	All My Heroes Are Cornballs	8.3	10 reviews	
4	Freddie Gibbs & Madlib	Bandana	8.1	24 reviews	
5	Kano	Hoodies All Summer	8.1	14 reviews	

== See also ==
- Previous article: 2018 in hip-hop
- Next article: 2020 in hip-hop
