= Quando Rondo discography =

Hip hop recording artist discography

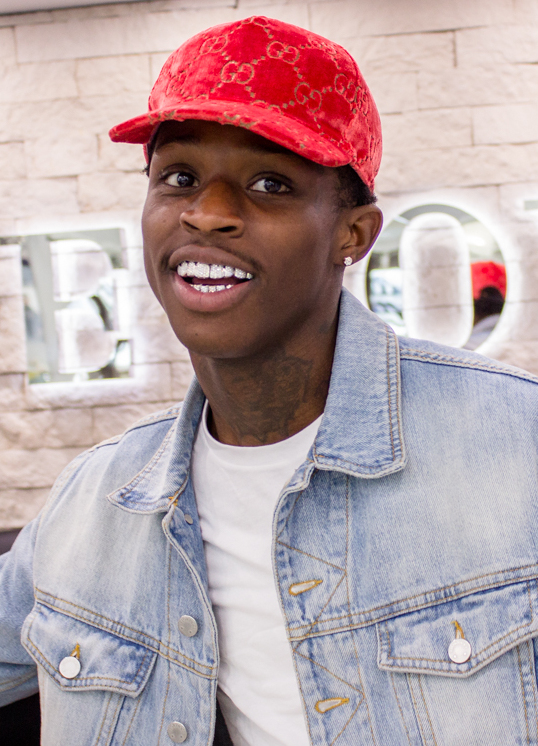
- Quando Rondo in 2019
- Studio albums: 4
- Singles: 45
- Mixtapes: 6

The discography of American rapper Quando Rondo consists of two studio albums, six mixtapes, and forty-five singles.

== Albums ==
=== Studio albums ===
List of albums with selected details
Title	Album details	Peak chart positions			
Title	Album details	US	US R&B/HH	US Rap	CAN
QPac	Released: January 10, 2020; Label: Never Broke Again, Atlantic; Format: Digital download, streaming	22	14	13	78
Recovery	Released: March 24, 2023; Label: Quando Rondo LLC, Never Broke Again, Atlantic; Format: CD, digital download, streaming	—	—	—	—
Here for a Reason	Scheduled: November 15, 2024; Label: Quando Rondo LLC, Never Broke Again, Atlantic; Format: Digital download, streaming	—	—	—	—

== Mixtapes ==
List of mixtapes with selected album details
Title	Mixtape details	Peak chart positions		
Title	Mixtape details	US	US R&B/HH	US Rap
Life B4 Fame	Released: April 17, 2018; Label: Self-released; Format: Digital download, streaming	—	—	—
Life After Fame	Released: September 24, 2018; Label: Never Broke Again, Atlantic; Format: Digital download streaming	138	—	—
From the Neighborhood to the Stage	Released: May 10, 2019; Label: Never Broke Again, Atlantic; Format: Digital download, streaming	29	16	14
Diary of a Lost Child	Released: August 26, 2020; Label: Never Broke Again, Atlantic; Format: Digital Download, streaming	—	—	—
Still Taking Risks	Released: May 7, 2021; Label: Quando Rondo LLC, Never Broke Again, Atlantic; Format: Digital download, streaming	101	—	—
"—" denotes a recording that did not chart or was not released in that territory.

=== Collaborative mixtapes ===
List of collaborative mixtapes with selected chart positions
Title	Mixtape details	Peak chart positions		
Title	Mixtape details	US	US R&B/HH	US Rap
3860 (with YoungBoy Never Broke Again)	Released: November 25, 2022; Label: Quando Rondo LLC, Never Broke Again, Atlantic; Format: Digital download, streaming	62	24	15

== Extended plays ==
List of extended plays
Title	EP details
Here for a Reason: In The Darkest Time	Released: August 16, 2024; Label: Quando Rondo LLC, Never Broke Again, Atlantic; Format: Digital download, streaming

== Singles ==
=== As lead artist ===
List of singles as lead artist showing year released and album name
Title	Year	Certifications	Album
"I Remember" (featuring Lil Baby)	2018	RIAA: Platinum	Life B4 Fame
"Motivation"	2018		Life B4 Fame
"Paradise"	2018		Life B4 Fame
"ABG"	2018	RIAA: Platinum	Life B4 Fame
"Kiccin' Shit"	2018		Life After Fame
"Rich Homie Quando" (featuring Rich Homie Quan)	2018		Life After Fame
"Lovers and Friends" (featuring YK Osiris)	2018		Life After Fame
"I Dunno"	2018		The Prophesy – A Blueprint of Future Reality
"First 48"	2018		Non-album single
"Gun Powder"	2019		From the Neighborhood to the Stage
"Scarred from Love"	2019	RIAA: Gold	From the Neighborhood to the Stage
"Neighborhood Hero"	2019		From the Neighborhood to the Stage
"Imperfect Flower"	2019	RIAA: Platinum	Non-album singles
"Picture Me This Way"	2019		Non-album singles
"Red Roses" (with Richi Ray and NL Skooby)	2019		Non-album singles
"Couldn't Beat the Odds"	2019		Non-album singles
"Just Keep Going"	2019		QPac
"Double C's"	2019		QPac
"Caught Up In My Thoughts"	2019		Non-album single
"My Killer Comin"	2019		Before My Time Up
"Marvelous" (featuring Polo G)	2019		QPac
"Collect Calls"	2019		QPac
"How'd I Make It"	2019		Non-album single
"Bad Vibe" (featuring A Boogie wit da Hoodie and 2 Chainz)	2020		QPac
"Depression"	2020		Diary of a Lost Child
"Groupie Bitches"	2020		Non-album single
"Shorty"	2020		RGB 3
"Nita's Grandson"	2020		Non-album singles
"Who Died"	2020		Non-album singles
"Sticc to the Code"	2020		Non-album singles
"1999"	2020		Non-album singles
"My Life Story"	2020		Non-album singles
"End of Story"	2020		Still Taking Risks
"Have You Ever"	2020		Non-album single
"Soul Reaper"	2021		Still Taking Risks
"Red Eye"	2021		Still Taking Risks
"Okay"	2021		Still Taking Risks
"Dead Wrong"	2022		Non-album singles
"Jakiyah"	2022		Non-album singles
"Six-0 Business"	2022		Non-album singles
"10.27"	2022		Non-album singles
"24"	2022		Non-album singles
"War Baby"	2022		Non-album singles
"Give Me A Sign" (with YoungBoy Never Broke Again)	2022		3860, Recovery & Here for a Reason: In The Darkest Time
"Cream Soda"	2022		3860
"Keep Me Dry" (with YoungBoy Never Broke Again)	2022		3860
"It's On" (with YoungBoy Never Broke Again)	2022		3860
"Speeding"	2023		Recovery
"Long Live Pabb"	2023		Recovery
"Me First"	2023		Recovery
"Tear It Down"	2023		Recovery
"Feel This Way"	2023		Non-album singles
"Cash"	2023		Here for a Reason
"Gotta Do Better & Pray"	2024		Here for a Reason & Here for a Reason: In The Darkest Time
"Luh Wodie"	2024		Here for a Reason

== Other charted and certified songs ==
List of other charted songs, with selected chart positions
Title	Year	Peak chart positions			Certifications	Album
Title	Year	US	US R&B/HH	US Rap	Certifications	Album
"I Am Who They Say I Am" (YoungBoy Never Broke Again featuring Kevin Gates and Quando Rondo)	2018	69	24	21	RIAA: 2× Platinum	4Respect
"This for The" (YoungBoy Never Broke Again featuring Quando Rondo)	2018	—	—	—	RIAA: Gold	4Respect 4Freedom 4Loyalty 4WhatImportant
"Nobody Hold Me" (YoungBoy Never Broke Again featuring Quando Rondo)	2018	—	—	—	RIAA: Gold	4Respect 4Freedom 4Loyalty 4WhatImportant
"Bacc To The Basics"	2018	—	—	—	RIAA: Gold	Life After Fame
"New Ones" (Quando Rondo featuring NoCap)	2019	—	—	—	RIAA: Gold	From the Neighborhood to the Stage
"Dope Boy Dreams"	2019	—	—	—	RIAA: Gold	From the Neighborhood to the Stage
"Outta Here Safe" (YoungBoy Never Broke Again featuring Quando Rondo and NoCap)	2019	— (Note: "Outta Here Safe" did not chart on the Billboard Hot 100, but peaked at number 23 on the Bubbling Under Hot 100 Singles chart.)	—	—	RIAA: Gold	AI YoungBoy 2
"Suited Panamera" (YoungBoy Never Broke Again featuring Quando Rondo)	2020	— (Note: "Suited Panamera" did not chart on the Billboard Hot 100, but peaked at number four on the Bubbling Under Hot 100 Singles chart.)	48	—		Still Flexin, Still Steppin
"Gangsta" (YoungBoy Never Broke Again featuring Quando Rondo)	2022	— (Note: "Gangsta" did not chart on the Billboard Hot 100, but peaked at number nine on the Bubbling Under Hot 100 Singles chart.)	49	—		Colors

== Guest appearances ==
List of non-single guest appearances, with other performing artists, showing year released and album name
Title	Year	Other performer(s)	Album
"Need a Best Friend"	2018	A Boogie wit da Hoodie, Lil Quee	Hoodie SZN
"Problems"	2018	Shy Glizzy, Lil Durk	Fully Loaded
"Brag Different"	2019	NoCap	The Hood Dictionary
"Pain"	2019	Yung Bleu	Throw Aways
"Been Thru"	2019	Lil Poppa	Almost Normal
"Want Beef?" (Remix)	2020	YSN Flow	Flow $ZN
"Violent Livin"	2021	BROKEASF	WRONG 1
"Average"	2021	YFN Lucci	—N/a
"Do U Luv Me"	2021	Never Broke Again	Never Broke Again: The Compilation, Vol. 1
"Did Me Wrong"	2021	Never Broke Again, P Yungin	Never Broke Again: The Compilation, Vol. 1
"Gangsta"	2022	YoungBoy Never Broke Again	Colors
"All Day Lurkin"	2022	Never Broke Again	Never Broke Again Presents: Green Flag Activity
"In The Dark"	2022	Never Broke Again	Never Broke Again Presents: Green Flag Activity
"Birdz"	2022	88GLAM	Close to Heaven Far from God
"I Been Tryin"	2022	Meechy Baby	Who is Meechy 2
