= Jetsonmade =

American record producer and songwriter from South Carolina

JetsonMade
- Born: Tahj Morgan; July 27, 1996 (age 30); Columbia, South Carolina, U.S.
- Genres: Hip hop; trap
- Occupations: Record producer; songwriter; record executive
- Years active: 2010–present
- Labels: Sony/ATV; BoyMeetsSpace

Tahj Morgan (born July 27, 1996), known professionally as JetsonMade (stylized in all lowercase), is an American record producer and songwriter. He has been noted as a pioneer of the growing rap scene in the Carolinas. He has produced many hit songs, with the most notable being "Suge" and "Bop" by fellow North Carolinian, rapper DaBaby, as well as "Whats Poppin" by Kentucky rapper Jack Harlow, and “@ Meh” by Atlanta rapper Playboi Carti. He is also noted for his popular producer tag, "Oh Lord, Jetson made another one!".

== Early life ==
Tahj Morgan was born on July 27, 1996, in Columbia, South Carolina. He graduated from Richland Northeast High School in 2014. He then went to college for two semesters, but dropped out.

== Career ==
Morgan earned his first production placement on 21 Savage's 2015 mixtape The Slaughter King, on the track "Slime" with Young Nudy.

In March 2019, Morgan produced DaBaby's hit single "Suge", which peaked at number seven on the Billboard Hot 100. Shortly after, he signed a publishing deal with Sony/ATV Music Publishing. He later on produced other hit singles, such as "Bop" by DaBaby and "Start wit Me" by Roddy Ricch and Gunna, both of which charted on the Billboard Hot 100. He also was at the Dreamville recording sessions.

Going into 2020, Morgan produced Jack Harlow's breakout single "Whats Poppin", which peaked at number two on the Billboard Hot 100, making it Harlow's first Hot 100 hit, and was certified Platinum by the RIAA. He also earned his first two Grammy nominations for his work on DaBaby's "Suge".

In August 2020 he became the first person to curate the music for XXL's 2020 Freshman Class.

== Other ventures ==
Morgan founded the record label BoyMeetSpace in Mid 2019. Its artists included the late rapper 18veno, while its record producers include 1st Class, Neeko Baby, Psilo, Kaycxs, Deskhop, and the label's latest addition, Jee.

In August 2020 he became the first person to curate the music for XXL's 2020 Freshman Class. The 2020 XXL Class included frequent collaborators of jetsonmade's like Jack Harlow and Lil Keed.

In 2021, he produced for NLE Choppa and Young Nudy, and in 2022, he guest featured and produced on DC The Don's song "Rerout3", as well ss Rot Ken's song "No Mind", which he produced with OG Parker, Beezo, liltyh, Humblebee, and Taz Taylor.

== Controversy ==
In July 2020, it was revealed that Morgan was selling one of American rapper Playboi Carti's unreleased songs to leaker Shogani for $17,000 in Bitcoin, whom he previously worked with on his song "@ MEH". He has since denied this claim, claiming that he was "trolling".

== Discography ==
=== Studio albums ===
Title	Album details
TBA	Scheduled: TBA; Label: BoyMeetSpace; Format: Digital download

=== Collaborative albums ===
Collaboration Albums
Title	Album details
The Way (with Highway)	Released: February 19, 2021; Label: Highway; Format: Digital download

=== Singles ===
Title	Year	Album
"Tik Tik Tik" (with Yung Bans)	2019	Non-album single
"Anotha One" (with Yxng K.A)	2020	Baby Reaper
"REROUT3" (with DC the Don)	2021	My Own Worst Enemy

=== Other charted and certified songs ===
Title	Year	Peak chart positions			Certifications	Album
Title	Year	US	US R&B/HH	NZ Hot	Certifications	Album
"I Wanna See Some Ass" (Jack Harlow featuring and JetsonMade)	2020	—	—	—	RMNZ Gold	Sweet Action
"Lightskin Shit" (DaBaby featuring Future and JetsonMade)	2020	53	21	11		Blame It on Baby
"—" denotes a recording that did not chart or was not released in that territory.

== Production discography ==
=== Charted singles ===
Title	Year	Peak chart positions						Album
Title	Year	US	US R&B/HH	AUS	CAN	IRE	UK	Album
"Suge" (DaBaby)	2019	7	3	58	32	65	—	Baby on Baby
"Start wit Me" (Roddy Ricch featuring Gunna)	2019	56	25	—	63	—	—	Please Excuse Me for Being Antisocial
"Bop" (DaBaby)	2019	11	4	63	23	39	66	Kirk
"Whats Poppin" (Jack Harlow or remix featuring DaBaby, Tory Lanez, & Lil Wayne)	2020	2	2	9	24	26	44	Sweet Action and Thats What They All Say
"Vibez" (DaBaby)	2020	21	12	—	40	68	—	Kirk
"@ MEH" (Playboi Carti)	2020	35	17	—	27	32	51	Non-album single
"Lion King on Ice" (J. Cole)	2020	51	15	—	59	45	65	Lewis Street
"Way Out" (Jack Harlow featuring Big Sean)	2020	74	18	—	51	77	—	Thats What They All Say
"Vette Motors" (YoungBoy Never Broke Again)	2022	62	19	—	—	—	—	The Last Slimeto
"—" denotes a recording that did not chart or was not released in that territory.

=== Other charted songs ===
Title	Year	Peak chart positions				Album
Title	Year	US	US R&B/HH	CAN	NZ Hot	Album
"Gospel" (DaBaby featuring Gucci Mane, Chance the Rapper, and YK Osiris)	2019	55	32	82	19	Kirk
"Ranada" (YoungBoy Never Broke Again)	2019	— (Note: "Ranada" did not chart on the Billboard Hot 100, but peaked at number four on the Bubbling Under Hot 100 chart.)	—	—	—	AI YoungBoy 2
"Peace Hardly" (YoungBoy Never Broke Again)	2020	— (Note: "Peace Hardly" did not enter the Billboard Hot 100, but did peak at number 13 on the Bubbling Under Hot 100 chart.)	—	—	—	Top
"Already Best Friends" (Jack Harlow featuring Chris Brown)	2020	—	—	—	16	Thats What They All Say
"—" denotes a recording that did not chart or was not released in that territory.

== Production credits ==
Year	Song	Artist	Album	Notes
2015	"Slime"	21 Savage	Slaughter King	N/A
2018	"Zone 6"	Young Nudy	Slimeball 3	produced w/ Fore'n
2019	"Suge"	DaBaby	Baby on Baby	produced w/ Pooh Beatz
2019	"Goin Baby"	DaBaby	Baby on Baby	produced w/ OJ Finessey & Eddie Priest
2019	"Carpet Burn"	DaBaby	Baby on Baby	produced w/ 1st Class & Nick Mira
2019	"Tupac"	DaBaby	Baby on Baby	produced w/ Yung Lan
2019	"Backend"	DaBaby	Baby on Baby	N/A
2019	"Drop the Top"	Lil Gotit, Lil Keed	Crazy But It's True	produced w/ Supah Mario
2019	"Sticks"	Stunna 4 Vegas, DaBaby	Big 4x	N/A
2019	"Havin My Way"	Stunna 4 Vegas, Young Nudy	Big 4x	produced w/ 1st Class
2019	"Oh My God"	Lil Keed	Long Live Mexico	produced w/ OJ Finessey
2019	"Pull Up"	Lil Keed, Lil Uzi Vert, YNW Melly	Long Live Mexico	produced w/ Producer 20
2019	"It's Up Freestyle"	Lil Keed	Non-album single	produced w/ OJ Finessey & Fore'n
2019	"Bop"	DaBaby	Kirk	produced w/ Starboy
2019	"Vibez"	DaBaby	Kirk	produced w/ Neeko Baby & Jasper Harris
2019	"Gospel"	DaBaby, Chance the Rapper, Gucci Mane, YK Osiris	Kirk	produced w/ 1st Class & Mantiz
2019	"Ranada"	YoungBoy Never Broke Again	AI YoungBoy 2	produced w/ Yung Lan
2019	"Bats Fly"	Kid Ink, Rory Fresco	Non-album singles	produced w/ CashMoneyAP & Nils
2019	"Fashion Week"	Rico Nasty	Non-album singles	N/A
2019	"Full Time Cappers"	G-Eazy, French Montana, Moneybagg Yo	Scary Nights	produced w/ 1st Class
2019	"Start wit Me"	Roddy Ricch, Gunna	Please Excuse Me for Being Antisocial	produced w/ Jasper Harris
2020	"Dripped Out"	Quando Rondo, Luh Kel	QPac	produced w/ Neeko Baby & Einer Bankz
2020	"Lightskin Shit"	DaBaby, Future	Blame It on Baby	produced w/ Outtatown & Starboy
2020	"I'm Up"	Nav	Brown Boy 2	produced w/ Tay Keith & Nils
2022	"Donatello"	DC the Don	My Own Worst Enemy	produced w/ Tom Levesque, Alex Goldblatt, Neeko Baby, Rio Leyva, & Jasper Harris

== Awards and nominations ==
Year	Nominee / work	Award	Result	Ref.
2020	"Suge"	Grammy Award for Best Rap Song	Nominated	
