= Levi High =

Single by DaniLeigh featuring DaBaby

Single by DaniLeigh featuring DaBaby
- Released: March 13, 2020
- Length: 2:23
- Label: Def Jam
- Songwriters: Danielle Curiel; David Biral; Denzel Baptiste; Jonathan Lyndale Kirk
- Producer: Take a Daytrip

DaniLeigh singles chronology
"Cravin" (2019)	"Levi High" (2020)	"Dominican Mami" (2020)

DaBaby singles chronology
"S.O.E" (2020)	"Levi High" (2020)	"Vibez" (2020)

Music video
- "Levi High" on YouTube

"Levi High" is a song by Dominican-American singer and rapper DaniLeigh featuring fellow American rapper DaBaby. The song was released on March 16, 2020, marking the second collaboration between the two following the former's choreography work on the latter's "Bop" music video.

== Background and composition ==
Prior to the song's release, DaniLeigh teased the single on her Instagram account, inviting fans to take part in the "#levihighchallenge". The song is a reference to Levi denim jeans.

== Music video ==
The single was released alongside a music video directed by Kat Webber. The video portrays the two artists as a "Bonnie and Clyde" duo that pull off a heist. A behind-the-scenes video was released on March 18, 2020.

== Charts ==
Chart (2020)	Peak position
US Rhythmic (Billboard)	32

== Release history ==
Region	Date	Format	Label	Ref.
Various	March 13, 2020	Digital download; streaming	Def Jam	
United States	March 17, 2020	Urban contemporary radio	Def Jam	
