= Wrong (Luh Kel song) =

2019 single by Luh Kel

Single by Luh Kel

from the album Mixed Emotions
- Released: April 5, 2019
- Length: 3:00
- Label: Cinematic
- Songwriter: Turran Coleman
- Producers: BubbaGotBeatz; Jonny Shipes; 11VN

Luh Kel singles chronology
"Wrong" (2019)	"BRB" (2019)

Music video
- "Wrong" on YouTube

"Wrong" is a debut single by American rapper Luh Kel, released on April 5, 2019. It gained recognition through the video-sharing app TikTok, becoming his breakout hit, and is the lead single from his debut studio album Mixed Emotions (2019).

== Background ==
In an interview with Genius, Luh Kel stated:

So, I was in the living room and I was actually genuinely talking about a girl. And it was about me showing my affection to her. See, but while I was making the little video, I got a call. And they had told me, they was like, "Yeah, your girlfriend here doing this, dah, dah, dah." So, I'm like, "Aight." Then I got sad, I got mad, you hear me.

Luh Kel initially recorded "Wrong" only for Instagram and did not plan for it to be a song. But when it started attracting attention, he took it to the studio and received the beat from Bubba Got Beats.

According to him, he teased the song for seven months, lying about when it would be released until he was ready to do so. The song found popularity via a dance challenge on TikTok, which largely helped Kel to prominence.

== Content ==
In the song, Luh Kel sings about his heartbreak as a result of being cheated on by a girl he loved.

== Remix ==
An official remix of the song was released on April 10, 2020, and features American rapper Lil Tjay. It appears on Luh Kel's second studio album L.O.V.E. (2020).

== Charts ==
Chart (2019)	Peak position
US Bubbling Under Hot 100 (Billboard)	1
US Hot R&B/Hip-Hop Songs (Billboard)	37

== Certifications ==
Region	Certification	Certified units/sales
New Zealand (RMNZ)	Platinum	30,000^{‡}
United States (RIAA)	Platinum	1,000,000^{‡}
^{‡} Sales+streaming figures based on certification alone.
