= Umm Hmm =

2022 song by YoungBoy Never Broke Again

Song by YoungBoy Never Broke Again

from the album The Last Slimetop
- Released: August 5, 2022
- Length: 2:12
- Label: Never Broke Again; Atlantic
- Songwriters: Kentrell Gaulden; Samuel Thanni; Gregory Sanders Jr.; Julien B. Anderson
- Producers: Khris James; HitmanAudio

"Umm Hmm" is a song by American rapper YoungBoy Never Broke Again from his fourth studio album The Last Slimeto (2022). It was produced by Khris James and HitmanAudio.

== Critical reception ==
In a review of The Last Slimeto, Robin Murray of Clash cited the song as one of the album's rather subpar tracks, writing that it "struggles to assert itself." In contrast, Mosi Reeves of Rolling Stone considered it one of the album's standout tracks which YoungBoy is "bringing to the fore".

== Charts ==
Chart performance for "Umm Hmm"
Chart (2022)	Peak position
Global 200 (Billboard)	119
US Billboard Hot 100	37
US Hot R&B/Hip-Hop Songs (Billboard)	11

== Certifications ==
Region	Certification	Certified units/sales
United States (RIAA)	Gold	500,000^{‡}
^{‡} Sales+streaming figures based on certification alone.
