= @ Meh =

2020 single by Playboi Carti

Single by Playboi Carti
- Released: April 16, 2020
- Recorded: December 2019
- Length: 2:46
- Label: AWGE; Interscope
- Songwriters: Jordan Carter; Tahj Morgan; Dondre Moore; Ian Wells
- Producers: JetsonMade; Neeko Baby; Deskhop

Playboi Carti singles chronology
"Get Dripped" (2018)	"@ Meh" (2020)	"Miss the Rage" (2021)

Music video
- @ Meh on YouTube

"@ Meh" (stylized in all caps; pronounced "at me") is a song by American rapper Playboi Carti, released on April 16, 2020. It was released in promotion for Carti's second studio album Whole Lotta Red; however, it was excluded from the project's final tracklist. The song was produced by jetsonmade, Neeko Baby, and Deskhop. Playboi Carti uses his "baby voice" in the song, which was notably heard in the unreleased track "Pissy Pamper" prior to the song's release.

== Critical reception ==
Charles Holmes of Rolling Stone writes that "'@ Meh' sounds like a Fisher-Price Fruity Loops jamboree as performed by a PlayStation 4. In a high-pitched 'baby voice', Carti sings about everything he hates about 'pussy ass niggas'."

In September 2024, Pitchfork included "@ Meh" on their list of "The 100 Best Songs of the 2020s So Far", ranking it at number 63.

== Music video ==
The music video for "@ Meh" debuted on the same day as the song's release, and was directed by Carti himself and Nick Walker. Playboi Carti is seen in a blue, dimly lit backdrop while he lip-syncs and gestures throughout the song. There are various cuts which show young female models in the same backdrop. "@ Meh" has around 35 million views on YouTube as of November 2026.

== Personnel ==
Credits adapted from Tidal.

- Jordan Carter – composer
- DeskHop – producer, composer
- JetsonMade – producer, composer
- Neeko Baby – producer, composer
- Colin Leonard – mastering engineer
- Roark Bailey – mixer, recording engineer

== Charts ==
Chart (2020)	Peak position
Austria (Ö3 Austria Top 40)	68
Belgium Urban (Ultratop Flanders)	49
Canada Hot 100 (Billboard)	27
France (SNEP)	197
Ireland (IRMA)	32
New Zealand (Recorded Music NZ)	34
Portugal (AFP)	74
Switzerland (Schweizer Hitparade)	53
UK Singles (Official Charts)	51
US Billboard Hot 100	35
US Hot R&B/Hip-Hop Songs (Billboard)	17
