= Bestie (DaBaby and YoungBoy Never Broke Again song) =

2022 single by DaBaby and YoungBoy Never Broke Again

Single by DaBaby and YoungBoy Never Broke Again

from the album Better than You
- Released: January 10, 2022 (as Bestie/Hit); April 19, 2022
- Length: 1:51
- Label: Atlantic; Interscope; South Coast; Never Broke Again
- Songwriters: Jonathan Kirk; Kentrell Gaulden; Uzoma Harbor; Adam Gamble
- Producers: Uzoh; Kayothewizard

DaBaby singles chronology
"Neighborhood Superstar" (2022)	"Bestie" (2022)	"Don't Rate Me" (2022)

YoungBoy Never Broke Again singles chronology
"Pull Up Actin" (2022)	"Bestie" (2022)	"Wig" (2022)

Music video
- "Bestie" on YouTube

"Bestie" is a song by American rappers DaBaby and YoungBoy Never Broke Again. It was first released on January 10, 2022 along with their other single "Hit", as a combined record called "Bestie/Hit". It is the third single from their collaborative mixtape Better than You (2022), and was sent to rhythmic contemporary radio on April 19, 2022.

== Composition ==
Jon Powell of Revolt described the song as "full of the hard-hitting vibes that both artists are well known for".

== Music video ==
The official music video was released on March 23, 2022 and directed by DaBaby. It finds two women entering DaBaby's house to party and take over his residence with drugs such as lean. NBA YoungBoy appears through FaceTime. The video also features a compilation of TikTok clips of a dance challenge to the song.

== Charts ==
Chart performance for "Bestie"
Chart (2022)	Peak position
US Bubbling Under Hot 100 (Billboard)	13
US Hot R&B/Hip-Hop Songs (Billboard)	43
US Rhythmic Airplay (Billboard)	39
