= Vibez (DaBaby song) =

2020 single by DaBaby

Single by DaBaby

from the album Kirk
- Released: March 31, 2020
- Genre: Hip hop
- Length: 2:24
- Label: Interscope; South Coast
- Songwriters: Jonathan Kirk; Tahj Morgan; Dondre Moore; Jasper Harris
- Producers: JetsonMade; Neeko Baby; Harris

DaBaby singles chronology
"Levi High" (2020)	"Vibez" (2020)	"Find My Way" (2020)

Music video
- "Vibez" on YouTube

"Vibez" (stylized in all caps) is a song by American rapper DaBaby. It was released to US rhythmic contemporary radio through Interscope Records on March 31, 2020, as the third single from DaBaby's second studio album Kirk (2019). It peaked at number 21 on the US Billboard Hot 100.

== Music video ==
The music video was released on October 1, 2019, and was directed by Reel Goats.

=== Reception ===
Michael Saponara of Billboard called the video "reckless".

== Critical reception ==
Noah C of HotNewHipHop called the track "ebullient" and "ferocious". On a less positive note, Trent Clark of HipHopDX called the track a "reheated version of 'Suge'".

== Charts ==
=== Weekly charts ===
Chart (2019–2020)	Peak position
Canada Hot 100 (Billboard)	27
Ireland (IRMA)	68
New Zealand Hot Singles (RMNZ)	12
US Billboard Hot 100	21
US Hot R&B/Hip-Hop Songs (Billboard)	12
US Rhythmic Airplay (Billboard)	16
US Rolling Stone Top 100	6

=== Year-end charts ===
Chart (2020)	Position
Canada (Canadian Hot 100)	74
US Hot R&B/Hip-Hop Songs (Billboard)	58

== Certifications ==
Certifications and sales for "Vibez"
Region	Certification	Certified units/sales
Australia (ARIA)	Gold	35,000^{‡}
Brazil (Pro-Música Brasil)	Platinum	40,000^{‡}
New Zealand (RMNZ)	Platinum	30,000^{‡}
Poland (ZPAV)	Gold	25,000^{‡}
Portugal (AFP)	Gold	5,000^{‡}
United Kingdom (BPI)	Silver	200,000^{‡}
United States (RIAA)	2× Platinum	2,000,000^{‡}
^{‡} Sales+streaming figures based on certification alone.

== Release history ==
Country	Date	Format	Label	Ref.
Various	September 27, 2019	Digital download; streaming	South Coast Music Group; Interscope	
United States	March 31, 2020	Rhythmic contemporary radio	South Coast Music Group; Interscope	
