= Better than You (mixtape) =

Mixtape by DaBaby and YoungBoy Never Broke Again

Mixtape by DaBaby and YoungBoy Never Broke Again
- Released: March 4, 2022
- Genre: Hip-hop; trap
- Length: 33:43
- Label: Atlantic; Interscope; South Coast; Never Broke Again
- Producer: Ambezza; Bapsxx; Ben10k; BlakeSale; Cardo; Cheese; Dmac; Glacier; Haze; Hurtboy AG; Indiagotthembeats; J. Stacks; Jahniya C.; Jhint; Johnny Juliano; Juko; Kayothewizard; Leor; Nash; Oxthello; Outofair; Paco Black; Red Jon; Sheila's Son; TnTXD; Tommy Parker; Uzoh; Yung Exclusive

DaBaby chronology
Back on My Baby Jesus Sh!t Again (2021)	Better than You (2022)	Baby on Baby 2 (2022)

YoungBoy Never Broke Again chronology
Colors (2022)	Better than You (2022)	The Last Slimeto (2022)

Singles from Better than You
- 1. "Hit" Released: January 10, 2022; 2. "Neighborhood Superstar" Released: February 25, 2022; 3. "Bestie" Released: April 19, 2022

Better than You (stylized in all caps) is a collaborative mixtape by American rappers DaBaby and YoungBoy Never Broke Again. It was released through record labels Atlantic Records, Interscope Records, South Coast Music Group, and Never Broke Again on March 4, 2022. The mixtape was supported by three singles: "Hit", "Neighborhood Superstar", and "Bestie". It includes production from Cardo, Johnny Juliano, Yung Exclusive, Cheese, BlakeSale, Leor, TnTXD, Ambezza, Uzoh, Kayothewizard, and Red Jon.

== Release and promotion ==
On January 10, 2022, DaBaby and YoungBoy released a two-track bundle on YouTube, titled Bestie / Hit, which consisted of the songs "Bestie" and "Hit", as part one and part two, respectively. "Hit" was released to streaming services as the lead single from Better than You the same day, while "Bestie" remained on YouTube without an official release until the mixtape's release. On February 24, Navjosh of the online hip-hop website HipHop-N-More published an article in which he said that the website "can exclusively confirm" the mixtape and its details. DaBaby and YoungBoy released the second single, "Neighborhood Superstar" the next day. On February 28, 2022, DaBaby reacted to the news and subtly revealed the cover art and tracklist, referring to the joint effort as the "collab of the century".

== Critical reception ==
Professional ratings
Review scores
Source	Rating
AllMusic	3/5 stars
HipHopDX	3.4/5

Writing for HotNewHipHop, Erika Marie predicted that "the very mention of Better Than You" can create controversy, especially considering King Von's posthumous album, What It Means to Be King, was also released today (March 4). She felt that "Louisiana and North Carolina collide as DaBaby and YoungBoy only rely on one another's talents on the record". Thomas Galindo of HotNewHipHop felt that YoungBoy's voice sounded like that of fellow American rapper Playboi Carti throughout the mixtape.

In a mixed review of the project, Preezy Brown of Vibe opined that "taking a more melodic approach throughout, YoungBoy leaves much of the traditional rapping to DaBaby, who rises to the occasion with a succession of cocksure rhyme spills tinged with oddball humor", adding that it "falls short of that lofty expectation and is spotty at best", "but the record includes moments that merit giving it a listen to hear two of the biggest superstars in rap joining forces if nothing else." AllMusic stated, "Better Than You doesn't expose any new collaborative chemistry, but offers several solid tracks of DaBaby doing what he does best, while NBA YoungBoy tries on some new guises".

== Commercial performance ==
Better than You debuted at number ten on the US Billboard 200 chart, earning 28,500 album-equivalent units (including 1,000 copies in pure album sales) in its first week. The album also accumulated 40.35 million on-demand streams of the album's songs.

== Track listing ==
All tracks are mixed, mastered, and recorded by producer Cheese. Alejandro Rodriguez-Dawson joins Cheese in recording for tracks 10 and 12.

Better than You track listing
No.	Title	Writer(s)	Producer(s)	Length
1.	"Hit"	Jonathan Kirk; Kentrell Gaulden; Ronald LaTour, Jr.; John Julian; Daveon Jackson; Jason Goldberg; Blake Jacob	Cardo; Johnny Juliano; Yung Exclusive; Cheese; BlakeSale	2:05
2.	"On this Line"	Kirk; Gaulden; Goldberg; India Williams; Leor Shavah; Jahniya Campbell	Cheese; Indiagotthembeats; Leor; Jahniya C	2:29
3.	"Little to a Lot"	Kirk; Gaulden; Goldberg; Thomas Horton; David McDowell; Nathan Lamarche; Ethan Hayes	Cheese; TnTXD; Dmac; Nash; Haze	3:38
4.	"WiFi"	Kirk; Gaulden; Dwayne Oats	Glacier	2:40
5.	"Turbo"	Kirk; Gaulden; Goldberg; Mathias Liyew; Othello Houston; Niklas Koellner; Phillip Mueller	Cheese; Ambezza; Oxthello; Outofair	2:59
6.	"BBL"	Kirk; Gaulden; Uzoma Harbor; Jalen Hinton; Adam Gamble	Uzoh; Jhint; Kayothewizard	3:12
7.	"Count on Me"	Kirk; Gaulden; Goldberg; Horton; Aaron Gilfenbain; Alexander Baptist; João Carneiro	Cheese; TnTXD; Hurtboy AG; Bapsxx; Red Jon	2:54
8.	"Syracuse"	Kirk; Gaulden; LaTour; Brian McClain, Jr.	Cardo; Sheila's Son	2:05
9.	"Creeper"	Kirk; Gaulden; Justus Stackhouse; Tyrik Bradley	J. Stacks; Paco Black	2:48
10.	"Head Off"	Kirk; Gaulden; Goldberg; Liyew; Thomas Lumpkins; Benjamin Wilson	Cheese; Ambezza; Tommy Parker; Ben10k	3:00
11.	"Neighborhood Superstar"	Kirk; Gaulden; Goldberg; Shavah; Jacob Sclaver	Cheese; Leor; Juko	3:55
12.	"Bestie"	Kirk; Gaulden; Harbor; Gamble	Uzoh; Kayothewizard	1:51
Total length:				33:43

== Personnel ==
- DaBaby – rap vocals
- YoungBoy Never Broke Again – rap vocals
- Jason Goldberg – mastering, mixing, engineering
- India Got Them Beats – bass, drums, percussion (2)
- Leor – bass, drums, percussion (2)
- Jahniya C – guitar, keyboards (2)
- Alejandro Rodriguez-Dawsøn – engineering (10, 12)

== Charts ==
Chart performance for Better than You
Chart (2022)	Peak position
Canadian Albums (Billboard)	62
US Billboard 200	10
US Top R&B/Hip-Hop Albums (Billboard)	7
