= Baby Sitter (song) =

2019 single by DaBaby

Single by DaBaby featuring Offset

from the album Baby on Baby
- Released: August 13, 2019
- Recorded: 2018
- Genre: Hip hop; trap
- Length: 2:37
- Label: Interscope; South Coast
- Songwriters: Jonathan Kirk; Kiari Cephus; Jamarii Massey; Patrick Joseph; Kevin Price
- Producers: MariiBeatz; Go Grizzly; P.Kaldone

DaBaby singles chronology
"Duck Sauce" (2019)	"Baby Sitter" (2019)	"Gucci Bag Latina" (2019)

Offset singles chronology
"Bussdown" (2019)	"Baby Sitter" (2019)	"Let's Get Married" (2019)

Music video
- "Baby Sitter" on YouTube

"Baby Sitter" is a song by American rapper DaBaby featuring fellow American rapper Offset from the former's debut studio album Baby on Baby (2019). It was released to rhythmic contemporary radio on August 13, 2019, as the album's second single. The song was produced by Go Grizzly and MariiBeatz.

== Composition ==
In the song, DaBaby raps about how he cannot resist trying to have sexual intercourse with a woman in his presence. In the chorus, he talks about wanting to fool around with the "baby sitter". Meanwhile, Offset's contributing verse outlines keeping his girl under control by ensuring she is not trying to make him lose his wealth and fame.

== Live performances ==
DaBaby performed the song with Offset at the 2019 BET Hip Hop Awards.

== Music video ==
The music video was released on April 3, 2019 and was directed by Reel Goats. Inspired by The Fresh Prince of Bel-Air television series, the visual finds DaBaby and Offset as brothers. While their "White step dad" is gone with a babysitter in charge, the rappers cause mischief around their sprawling Beverly Hills mansion. DaBaby's song "Pony" plays in the credits, and the clip ends with DaBaby being reprimanded by his father.

== Charts ==
=== Weekly charts ===
Chart (2019)	Peak position
US Billboard Hot 100	59
US Hot R&B/Hip-Hop Songs (Billboard)	28
US Rhythmic Airplay (Billboard)	11

=== Year-end charts ===
Chart (2019)	Position
US Hot R&B/Hip-Hop Songs (Billboard)	74

== Certifications ==
Region	Certification	Certified units/sales
United States (RIAA)	2× Platinum	2,000,000^{‡}
^{‡} Sales+streaming figures based on certification alone.
