= Vette Motors =

2022 single by YoungBoy Never Broke Again

Single by YoungBoy Never Broke Again

from the album The Last Slimeto
- Released: June 10, 2022
- Genre: Trap
- Length: 2:53
- Label: Never Broke Again; Atlantic
- Songwriters: Kentrell Gaulden; Jason Goldberg; Tahj Morgan; Joshua Parker; Bishop Grinnage
- Producers: Cheese; jetsonmade; OG Parker; Beezo

YoungBoy Never Broke Again singles chronology
| "Goals" (2022) | "Vette Motors" (2022) | "All My Shit Is Stupid" (2022) |

Music video
- "Vette Motors" on YouTube

"Vette Motors" is a song by American rapper YoungBoy Never Broke Again, released on June 10, 2022 as the fourth single from his fourth studio album The Last Slimeto (2022). It was produced by Jason "Cheese" Goldberg, jetsonmade, OG Parker and Beezo.

== Composition ==
In the song, NBA YoungBoy "flexes new flows and cadences", switching between aggressive rapping and melodic crooning, as he lists off his accomplishments, such as having new cars. The production is based on piano.

== Critical reception ==
Charles Lyons-Burt of Slant Magazine considered the song to be a standout from The Last Slimeto, describing it as "YoungBoy savoring the syllables of every one of his words in a manner that recalls Playboi Carti's just-short-of-possessed vocalizations."

== Charts ==
Chart performance for "Vette Motors"
| Chart (2022) | Peak position |
|---|---|
| US Billboard Hot 100 | 62 |
| US Hot R&B/Hip-Hop Songs (Billboard) | 19 |

== Certifications ==
| Region | Certification | Certified units/sales |
|---|---|---|
| United States (RIAA) | Platinum | 1,000,000^{‡} |
^{‡} Sales+streaming figures based on certification alone.
