= Goin Baby =

Song by DaBaby

Song by DaBaby

from the album Baby on Baby
- Released: March 1, 2019
- Genre: Hip hop; trap
- Length: 2:21
- Label: Interscope; South Coast
- Songwriters: Jonathan Kirk; Tahj Morgan; Gavin Valencia; Eze Ugbor, Jr.
- Producers: JetsonMade; OJ Finessey; Eddie Priest

Music video
- "Goin Baby" on YouTube

"Goin Baby" is a song by American rapper DaBaby, released on March 1, 2019, as the third track from his debut studio album Baby on Baby.

== Background ==
In an interview with Rolling Stone, DaBaby explained the song's title, saying, "Anything that you do [to] the best it could be done, you goin' baby... Anything that you do exceedingly well you goin' baby."

== Music video ==
The music video was released on March 25, 2019, and directed by Reel Goats. In it, DaBaby is seen on a private jet with many dolls, as well as at Times Square with "life-size baby blow-up suits".

== Charts ==
Chart (2019)	Peak position
US Bubbling Under Hot 100 (Billboard)	4
US Hot R&B/Hip-Hop Songs (Billboard)	46

== Certifications ==
Region	Certification	Certified units/sales
United States (RIAA)	2× Platinum	2,000,000^{‡}
^{‡} Sales+streaming figures based on certification alone.
