= The Last Slimeto =

Studio album by YoungBoy Never Broke Again
- Released: August 5, 2022
- Recorded: 2021–2022
- Genre: Hip-hop
- Length: 80:27
- Label: Never Broke Again; Atlantic
- Producer: 17OnDaTrack; 27 Heavy; Andy Made The Beat; ArmoTunez; Badmarks; Bans; BeatsAintFree JG; Beezo; BJondatrakk; Bobby Raps; Charlie Handsome; Cheese; Dissan; DJ Suede the Remix God; D-Roc; Duhvinci; DY Krazy; Eliot Bohr; Havokondabeatz; Haze; Hellgang Hitty; HitmanAudio; Horridrunitup; Hurtboy AG; Hzrd; Jay Lv; JB Sauced Up; Jetsonmade; K10Beatz; Kacey Khaliel; Karltin Bankz; Khris James; Kid Greer; Lastwordbeats; LayZBeats; LeeKickin; liltyh; LondnBlue; Loso; MalikOTB; MarcussMuzik Of Beat Execz; Medusa Beats; Menace Beats; Nick Schmidt; Nick Seeley; OG Parker; Palaze; Priority Beats; ProdByBerge; Prodsauceboy; Ran Beats; Rellmadedat; Ricci; Santo; Saucey Beats; S.L.M.N; Southside; TnTXD; UV Killin Em; Vadebeatz; Vani; WayV; Wylo; Xclusive; Yo Benji; Zuus

YoungBoy Never Broke Again chronology
| Better than You (2022) | The Last Slimeto (2022) | Realer 2 (2022) |

Singles from The Last Slimeto
- 1. "Mr. Grim Reaper" Released: February 8, 2022; 2. "I Hate YoungBoy" Released: February 22, 2022; 3. "Don't Rate Me" Released: May 5, 2022; 4. "Vette Motors" Released: June 10, 2022

The Last Slimeto is the fourth studio album by American rapper YoungBoy Never Broke Again, released on August 5, 2022, by Never Broke Again and Atlantic Records. The album serves as YoungBoy's final release in his contract with Atlantic Records. The album features guest appearances from Kehlani, Rod Wave, and Quavo, alongside production from Bobby Raps, DJ Suede the Remix God, Jetsonmade, OG Parker, Southside, and Jason "Cheese" Goldberg who mixed and mastered the entirety of the record. The album serves as a follow-up to Gaulden's sixteenth solo mixtape, Colors (2022).

The Last Slimeto received "generally favorable" reviews from music critics who applauded the album's content of "love, lust, and violence", whereas, some criticized the album's length. It debuted at number two on the US Billboard 200 chart, in which it earned 108,400 album-equivalent units, of which 4,600 were pure album sales. Fourteen of the thirty tracks from the album debuted on the Billboard Hot 100. The album was supported by four official singles: "Mr. Grim Reaper", "I Hate YoungBoy", "Don't Rate Me" featuring Quavo, and "Vette Motors".

== Background and recording ==
On July 5, 2022, it was announced through the Never Broke Again label that the entirety of the album was recorded while Gaulden was on house arrest, by Jason "Cheese" Goldberg and Khris "XO" James. During an interview, Goldberg went into depth about his recording process with Gaulden at his Utah home:

I'm recording YoungBoy at his home in Utah at the moment, and because of house arrest restrictions, we can only work 14 hours a day from 7am to 9pm. In the past we worked 24 hours a day. I'd fly to where he was, set up the studio there and then we'd work for two weeks straight. I sleep in the studio, because I want to be ready to go whenever he is. He loves working early in the morning. So if he comes into the studio at 4am, ready to work, he'll say, "Let me hear something," and I play him things until he says, "Pull that up".

The tracks on the album were recorded in several spontaneous areas in his home, including his garage—where "Proof" was recorded, his Tesla—where "Umm Hmm" was recorded, alongside several other areas such as Gaulden's Bentley Continental GT and his patio, "[Gaulden] was just looking over the mountain, giving me that record on a microphone with no booth". Goldberg stated that he would record songs wherever Gaulden sought comfort and felt free to express himself. He also stated that he'd be the one to choose the beats, contact the producers, and help Gaulden clear his mind before recording. Goldberg noted that they had over three hundred tracks to choose from during the album's selection process.

== Release and promotion ==
Following the release of Gaulden's third full-length studio album, Sincerely, Kentrell, he was released from jail on a $1.5 million bail. Gaulden was released on house arrest in Utah and released three mixtapes, From the Bayou (2021) with Birdman, Colors (2022), and Better than You (2022) with DaBaby. The album was first teased by Gaulden's in-house producer and engineer, Jason Goldberg through his Instagram, as he shared the album's official artwork. During the rollour of Colors, Gaulden expressed that Atlantic Records were attempting to blackball him form the music industry; it was later announced that The Last Slimeto would be Gaulden's last project under the label and that he allegedly turned down $25 million to re-sign.

On March 20, the Never Broke Again label officially shared the album's artwork, noting that it would be available for pre-order on April 1. The Last Slimeto Sampler—a seven-track sample of the album—was released on April 1 while teasing a total of thirty tracks to be released officially on August 5, the album's release date. This was released alongside the official music video for "4KT Baby", the album's twentieth cut. During the rollout of the album, Gaulden's label and music collective Never Broke Again released their compilation album, Green Flag Activity on June 10. Aiding the album's hype, on July 15, Gaulden was found not guilty in one of his two federal firearm charges, after which he noted that he's "feeling great". Just a day prior to the official release of the album, on August 4, Gaulden shared the album's official tracklist, teasing features from Kehlani, Rod Wave, and Quavo. Upon the release of the album, Gaulden had taken to his Instagram to share a message regarding the album and the completion of his record deal with Atlantic Records:

To be honest I really don't care about this being my last album. I finally can say I completed something. I ain't finish school. I never finish nothing but my smoke… but nah gangster I then shedded tears from the way y'all been doing me but it's all for the better tell li Dave and my grandma I completed something and I'm doing fine

On the day of the album's release, the official music video for the album's intro, "I Know" was released. The music video for the album's fifteenth cut, "Digital" was released on August 7, soon followed by the official music video for "Proof" on August 8.

=== Singles ===
The album's lead single, "Mr. Grim Reaper" was released on February 8, 2022. On February 14, Gaulden released the non-album single, "Superbowl", an ode to the Super Bowl LVI; in the song's bio on YouTube, he hinted at the release of the album: "I'm stalling into the album (get ready) I'm gone keep dropping". On February 22, he dropped the non-album single, "Opposite", in which he teased the release of his mixtape, Realer 2. On February 22, as a response to Lil Durk's disstrack, "Ahhh Ha", Gaulden released the album's second single, "I Hate YoungBoy", produced by Jason Goldberg, K10Beatz, Horridrunitup, and Rellmadedat. It later peaked at number 79 on the Billboard Hot 100. On March 14, YoungBoy exclusively released the music video for the album's twenty-eight cut, "I Got the Bag". On March 17, YoungBoy released the music video for "Holy", the album's twenty-seventh cut. The latter two tracks later officially appeared on the album. On May 1, Gaulden released the official music video for "Loner Life". The album's third single, "Don't Rate Me", featuring Quavo was released on May 5. In the months leading up to the release of the album, Gaulden released several non-album singles, "See Me Now" on May 14, "Proud of Myself" on May 23, and "Goals" on May 29. On June 9, Gaulden released the music video for "Vette Motors", before it was officially released on June 10 as the album's fourth and final single. It was produced by Jason "Cheese" Goldberg, Jetsonmade, OG Parker, and Beezo. The track peaked at number 62 on the Billboard Hot 100. This was followed by several more non-album singles such as, "Feel Good" on July 2, "I Don't Talk" on July 18, "Change" on July 25, and "She Want Chanel" on July 27.

== Critical reception ==
Professional ratings
Aggregate scores
| Source | Rating |
|---|---|
| Metacritic | 62/100 |
Review scores
| Source | Rating |
| AllMusic | 3/5 stars |
| Clash | 6/10 |
| HipHopDX | 3/5 stars |
| Pitchfork | 5.8/10 |
| Rolling Stone | 3/5 stars |
| Slant Magazine | 3.5/5 stars |
| Spectrum Culture | 2/5 stars |

The Last Slimeto received generally positive reviews from music critics. Robin Murray from Clash stated "At times frustrating, 'The Last Slimeto' is never less than entertaining. A bracing, defiant gesture, it finds NBA YoungBoy embracing freedom with both hands." Writing for Pitchfork, Alphonse Pierre described the 30-track long album as "overwhelming" despite naming it "the neatest YoungBoy album." Alphonse described some tracks as "They fluctuate between fickle emotions like pain, anguish, and paranoia, usually with a hint of bitterness" while describing the album as a whole as "The Last Slimeto suppresses the knottiest and most uncomfortable aspects of his music." Mosi Reeves from Rolling Stone described the album as "overstuffed and overlong, but it's also undeniably compelling."

Charles Lyons-Burt from Slant Magazine describes songs on the album as "[a] namely melodrama marked by fatalistic romanticism and a flirtation with the specter of death", however, he also states that the 30-track long album "start[s] to cave under its unruly duration". He describes the album's entirety as "the album merely conjures a series of—albeit passionately relayed—images of love, lust, and violence." Paul Simpson from AllMusic stated that "Sitting through the entirety of The Last Slimeto is bound to be an exhausting experience to anyone but YoungBoy's many devout fans, but even if it seems to function more as a playlist than an album, it's definitely not monotonous, and the rapper's dedication to the game is unquestioned."

Writing for HipHopDX, Scott Glaysher noted that, "as enjoyable as these five or six songs are on The Last Slimeto, its merely too long to appreciate" and that "The Last Slimeto can't be enjoyed as a full "project" but instead a half dozen songs scattered across playlists that have the same album cover."

=== Year-end lists ===
Select year-end rankings of The Last Slimeto
| Publication | List | Rank | Ref. |
|---|---|---|---|
| Slant Magazine | The 20 Best Hip-Hop Albums of 2022 | 1 | |

== Commercial performance ==
The Last Slimeto debuted at number two on the US Billboard 200 chart, (earning 108,400 album-equivalent units [including 4,600 pure sales]) around 400 margins less than the week's number one album, Bad Bunny's Un Verano Sin Ti. The album also accumulated a total of 161.92 million on-demand streams of the album's songs. In its second week, the album dropped to number five, moving an additional 50,000 units. In its third week, the album dropped to number six, moving an additional 30,000 units. On November 7, 2022, The Last Slimeto was certified gold by the Recording Industry Association of America. As of December 2022, The Last Slimeto was the 48th best-selling album in the United States, moving 634,000 album-equivalent units in the year, consisting of 6,000 pure sales, 13,000 song sales, 851,040,000 audio streams, and 155,596,000 video streams.

== Track listing ==
The Last Slimeto track listing
| No. | Title | Writer(s) | Producer(s) | Length |
|---|---|---|---|---|
| 1. | "I Know" | Kentrell Gaulden; Jason Goldberg; Eliot Bohr | Cheese; Bohr | 2:30 |
| 2. | "Hold Your Own" | Gaulden; Samuel Thanni; Junior Sinchi; Malik Bynoe-Fisher; Leonardo Mateus | Khris James; Jay LV; MalikOTB; WassupBans | 3:07 |
| 3. | "Umm Hmm" | Gaulden; Thanni; Gregory Sanders Jr.; Julien B. Anderson | Khris James; HitmanAudio | 2:12 |
| 4. | "Top Sound" | Gaulden; Thanni; Thomas Horton | Khris James; TnTXD | 1:41 |
| 5. | "My Time" | Gaulden; Goldberg; Joshua Luellen; Robert Richardson; Ryan Vojtesak; Dwan Avery | Cheese; Southside; Bobby Raps; Charlie Handsome; DY Krazy | 2:38 |
| 6. | "Free Dem 5's" | Gaulden; Thanni; Mateus; Marin Maric; Cedric Leutwyler | WassupBans; Kid Greer; Wylo | 2:49 |
| 7. | "My Go To" (featuring Kehlani) | Gaulden; Kehlani Parrish; Goldberg; Keenan Webb; Derrico Peck; Robert Halatuituia; Mohamed Sulaiman; Adam Feeney | Cheese; DJ Suede the Remix God; Priority Beats; Ricci; SLMN | 3:23 |
| 8. | "Lost Soul Survivor" | Gaulden; Goldberg; Mateus; Andy Chen; Aman Nikhanji | Cheese; WassupBans; Andy Made the Beat; Saucey Beats | 2:35 |
| 9. | "Fuck da Industry" | Gaulden; Thanni; Daniel Lebrun; Jeremy Bradley; Sven Steenbergen | 17ondatrack; D-Roc; JB Sauced Up | 3:01 |
| 10. | "Kamikaze" | Gaulden; Goldberg; Sanders Jr.; Maurice Polite Jr. | Cheese; HitmanAudio; Havokondabeatz | 3:20 |
| 11. | "Swerving" | Gaulden; Goldberg; Kyler Mathis; Gene Wagenaar; Anton Ingvarsson | Cheese; K10 Beatz; Medusa Beats; 27 Heavy | 2:27 |
| 12. | "Stay the Same" | Gaulden; Goldberg; Horton; Sterling Reynolds; Lukas Payne | Karltin Bankz; LONDNBLUE; TnTXD | 2:20 |
| 13. | "Home Ain't Home" (featuring Rod Wave) | Gaulden; Rodarius Green; Goldberg; Lebrun; Vilyam Vardumyan; Benjamin Hubble; Giovanni Rana | Cheese; D-Roc; Hzrd; LayZBeats; Vani | 2:21 |
| 14. | "7 Days" | Gaulden; Goldberg; Sanders Jr.; Marcus Gotch Jr. | Cheese; HitmanAudio; Marcussmuzik | 2:55 |
| 15. | "Digital" | Gaulden; Goldberg; Mathis; Wagenaar; Ingvarsson | Cheese; K10 Beatz; Medusa Beats; 27 Heavy | 2:34 |
| 16. | "Vette Motors" | Gaulden; Goldberg; Bishop Grinnage; Joshua Parker; Tahj Morgan | Cheese; Jetsonmade; OG Parker; Beezo | 2:53 |
| 17. | "Slow Down" | Gaulden; Thanni; Leburn; Julian Varlet; Benjamin Ibrahimovic; Aaron Ho | D-Roc; Dissan; WayvBeats; Yo Benji | 2:21 |
| 18. | "Don't Rate Me" (featuring Quavo) | Gaulden; Quavious Marshall; Goldberg; Nick Seeley; Kacey Khaliel; Sanders Jr. | Cheese; Hellgang Hitty; Pop Nick; Khaliel | 2:33 |
| 19. | "Proof" | Gaulden; Goldberg; Yuval Chain; Christoffer Marcussen; Randy De Boer; Francis Varela | Cheese; Palaze; Ran; Santo; UV killin em | 3:06 |
| 20. | "4KT Baby" | Gaulden; Goldberg; Lebrun; Traevon Walker; Duhvinci; BJondatrakk | Cheese; D-Roc; Xclusive; Duhvinci | 2:17 |
| 21. | "The North Bleeding" | Gaulden; Goldberg; Leonardo Mateus; Malike Bynoe-Fisher | Cheese; WassupBans; MalikOTB | 3:27 |
| 22. | "Loner Life" | Gaulden; Goldberg; Vilyam Vardumyan; Ethan Hayes; Brian Mitchell; Aaron Gilfenbain | Cheese; Zuus; Haze; Hzrd; Hurtboy AG | 2:13 |
| 23. | "Acclaimed Emotions" | Gaulden; Goldberg; Lebrun; Payne; Reynolds; Gineau Johan | Cheese; D-Roc; Karltin Bankz; LondnBlue; Loso | 3:00 |
| 24. | "Wagwan" | Gaulden; Goldberg; Adnan Khan; Varela | Cheese; Badmarks; Menace Beats; Santo | 2:29 |
| 25. | "Ghost" | Gaulden; Goldberg; Lebrun; Aaron Hill; Michael Roberge | Cheese; D-Roc; ProdByBerge; Lastwordbeats | 2:15 |
| 26. | "Nightfall" | Gaulden; Goldberg; Kareem Price; Kyler Mathis; LeeKickin | Cheese; K10 Beatz; LeeKickin; Sauceboy | 2:23 |
| 27. | "Holy" | Gaulden; Goldberg; Gilfenbain; Jonathan Gabor; Nicholas Schmidt | Cheese; BeatsAintFree JG; Nick Schmidt; Hurtboy AG | 1:57 |
| 28. | "I Got the Bag" | Gaulden; Goldberg; Lebrun; Thomas Mkrtchyan | Cheese; D-Roc; ArmoTunez | 2:18 |
| 29. | "Mr. Grim Reaper" | Gaulden; David Boonpetch | Vadebeatz | 2:52 |
| 30. | "I Hate YoungBoy" | Gaulden; Goldberg | Cheese; K10 Beatz; Horridrunitup; Rellmadedat | 4:21 |
| Total length: | | | | 80:28 |

Sample credits

- "Top Sound" contains an interpolation from "My Sound", written by Chico Rose, Alessandro Silveri, and Nick Leonardus van de Wall, as performed by Chico Rose and SLVR.
- "Don't Rate Me" contains a sample of "Dirty Harry", written by Damon Albarn and Romye Robinson, as performed by Gorillaz and Bootie Brown.

== Personnel ==
Credits adapted from Tidal.

Musicians

- YoungBoy Never Broke Again – vocals (all tracks)
- Kehlani – vocals (7)
- Rod Wave – vocals (13)
- Anna Krendel – additional vocals (18)
- Joshua Blond – additional vocals (18)
- Maya Shtangrud – additional vocals (18)
- Olivia Miranda – additional vocals (18)
- Sadie Stallcup – additional vocals (18)
- Quavo – vocals (18)

Technical

- Jason "Cheese" Goldberg – mastering, mixing (1–28, 30), recording (1, 5, 7–8, 10–14, 16, 18–28, 30)
- Khris James XO – mastering, mixing (29), recording (2–4, 6, 9, 10, 15, 17, 29)
- Cub$kout – recording (18)
- Schneider Sienes – assistant mixing (21–23, 25)

== Charts ==
=== Weekly charts ===
Chart performance for The Last Slimeto
| Chart (2022) | Peak position |
|---|---|
| Australian Digital Albums (ARIA) | 36 |
| Australian Hitseekers Albums (ARIA) | 2 |
| Canadian Albums (Billboard) | 12 |
| Dutch Albums (Album Top 100) | 92 |
| UK Albums (OCC) | 87 |
| UK R&B Albums (OCC) | 36 |
| US Billboard 200 | 2 |
| US Top R&B/Hip-Hop Albums (Billboard) | 1 |

=== Year-end charts ===
2022 year-end chart performance for The Last Slimeto
| Chart (2022) | Position |
|---|---|
| US Billboard 200 | 139 |
| US Top R&B/Hip-Hop Albums (Billboard) | 45 |

== Certifications ==
| Region | Certification | Certified units/sales |
|---|---|---|
| United States (RIAA) | Platinum | 1,000,000^{‡} |
^{‡} Sales+streaming figures based on certification alone.

== Release history ==
Release dates and formats for The Last Slimeto
| Region | Date | Label(s) | Format(s) | Edition(s) | Ref. |
|---|---|---|---|---|---|
| Various | April 1, 2022 | Never Broke Again; Atlantic | Digital download; streaming | The Last Slimeto Sampler | |
| Various | August 5, 2022 | Never Broke Again; Atlantic | Digital download; streaming | Standard | |
| United States | August 26, 2022 | Never Broke Again; Atlantic | CD | Standard | |
| Various | May 19, 2023 | Never Broke Again; Atlantic | LP | Standard | |

== See also ==
- 2022 in hip-hop
