= Neighborhood Superstar =

2022 single by DaBaby and YoungBoy Never Broke Again

Single by DaBaby and YoungBoy Never Broke Again

from the album Better than You
- Released: February 25, 2022
- Genre: Hip hop
- Length: 3:55
- Label: Atlantic; Interscope; South Coast; Never Broke Again
- Songwriters: Jonathan Kirk; Kentrell Gaulden; Jason Goldberg; Leor Shavah; Jacob Sclaver
- Producers: Cheese; Leor; Juko

DaBaby singles chronology
"Sneaky Link Anthem" (2022)	"Neighborhood Superstar" (2022)	"Bestie" (2022)

YoungBoy Never Broke Again singles chronology
"I Hate YoungBoy" (2022)	"Neighborhood Superstar" (2022)	"Pull Up Actin" (2022)

Music video
- "Neighborhood Superstar" on YouTube

"Neighborhood Superstar" is a song by American rappers DaBaby and YoungBoy Never Broke Again, released on February 25, 2022, as the second single from their collaborative mixtape Better than You (2022).

== Composition ==
The song contains a "heavy-hitting" beat and a hook from NBA YoungBoy. The rappers use a "street-oriented approach" from, rapping about overcoming conflict and their enemy gangs.

== Charts ==
Chart (2022)	Peak position
New Zealand Hot Singles (RMNZ)	33
US Billboard Hot 100	89
US Hot R&B/Hip-Hop Songs (Billboard)	31
