= Scary Nights (EP) =

EP by G-Eazy
- Released: October 18, 2019
- Recorded: 2019
- Genre: Hip hop
- Length: 26:54
- Label: BPG; RVG; RCA
- Producer: 1st Class; Audi; Boi-1da; Ben Billions; Charlie Heat; Christoph Andersson; CHY; Dnny Phntm; Foreign Teck; Jahaan Sweet; JetsonMade; Nik Dean; Nils; Nitrose; Preme; Sauceboy; Serato; Sevn Thomas; TheBoyKam; The Rascals

G-Eazy chronology
B-Sides (2019)	Scary Nights (2019)	Everything's Strange Here (2020)

Singles from Scary Nights
- 1. "I Wanna Rock" Released: October 15, 2019

Professional ratings
Review scores
Source	Rating
HipHopDX	3.4/5

Scary Nights is the ninth extended play by American rapper G-Eazy. It was released on October 18, 2019, by RCA Records. Production was handled by several record producers, including Boi-1da, Charlie Heat, Sevn Thomas, and The Rascals, among others. It features guest appearances from Gunna, French Montana, Moneybagg Yo, Ant Clemons, Preme, Dex Lauper, Miguel, and The Game. The EP charted at number 18 on the US Billboard 200. Music videos were released for "I Wanna Rock", "Hit Licks", and "K I D S", with the first two were directed by Daniel Cz, and "K I D S" were directed by Bryan Allen Lamb.

== Track listing ==
No.	Title	Writer(s)	Producer(s)	Length
1.	"Scary Nights"	Gerald Gillum; Matthew Samuels; Jahaan Sweet; Benjamin "Ben Billions" Diehl; Nils Noehden; Khris Riddick-Tynes; Leon Thomas III; Raynford "Preme" Humphrey; Tavoris "Vory" Hollins, Jr.	Boi-1da; Sweet; Ben Billions; Nils; The Rascals	3:56
2.	"I Wanna Rock" (featuring Gunna)	Gillum; Sergio Kitchens; Samuels; Sweet; Rupert Thomas, Jr.; Anthony "Audi" Phillips; Larry Gashi; Quentin Miller; Tahrence Brown	Boi-1da; Sweet; Sevn Thomas; Audi	2:43
3.	"Full Time Cappers" (featuring French Montana, Moneybagg Yo, and Ant Clemons)	Gillum; Karim Kharbouch; Demario White, Jr.; Anthony Clemons, Jr.; Tahj Morgan; Khaleel "1st Class" Griffin	JetsonMade; 1st Class	3:51
4.	"Big Ben" (featuring Preme)	Gillum; Humphrey; Daniel "Dnny Phntm" Cash; Phillip "Sauceboy" Campbell; Kamyar "TheBoyKam" Karimi	Dnny Phntm; Preme; Sauceboy; TheBoyKam	3:07
5.	"K I D S" (featuring Dex Lauper)	Gillum; Declyn "Dex" Lauper; Chy'enne "CHY" Williams; William "Nitrose" Hobbs IV	CHY; Nitrose	2:48
6.	"Hittin Licks"	Gillum; Ernest Brown III; Stephan "Serato" Ruggiero; Thomas Goodwin	Charlie Heat; Serato	2:35
7.	"Demons & Angels" (featuring Miguel and The Game)	Gillum; Miguel Pimentel; Jayceon Taylor; Michael "Foreign Teck" Hernandez; Dejan "Nik Dean" Nikolic; Clemons, Jr.; Eric McCaine; Keith Sweat; Tabitha Duncan	Foreign Teck; Nik Dean	4:14
8.	"A Very Strange Time"	Gillum; Christoph Andersson; Charles Thompson	Andersson	3:40
Total length:				26:54

== Charts ==
Chart (2019)	Peak position
Canadian Albums (Billboard)	30
Finnish Albums (Suomen virallinen lista)	42
Swiss Albums (Schweizer Hitparade)	91
US Billboard 200	27
US Top R&B/Hip-Hop Albums (Billboard)	19
US Top Rap Albums (Billboard)	16
