= I Am Who They Say I Am =

2018 song by YoungBoy Never Broke Again featuring Kevin Gates and Quando Rondo

Song by YoungBoy Never Broke Again featuring Kevin Gates and Quando Rondo

from the album 4Respect 4Freedom 4Loyalty 4WhatImportant
- Released: September 14, 2018
- Length: 3:20
- Label: Never Broke Again; APG; Atlantic
- Songwriters: Kentrell Gaulden; Tyquian Bowman; Keenan Webb
- Producers: DJ Suede the Remix God; Abby "Samir" Urbina

Music video
- "I Am Who They Say I Am" on YouTube

"I Am Who They Say I Am" is a song by American rapper YoungBoy Never Broke Again from his first compilation album 4Respect 4Freedom 4Loyalty 4WhatImportant (2018). It features American rappers Kevin Gates and Quando Rondo. The song was produced by DJ Suede the Remix God and Abby "Samir" Urbina.

== Content ==
The song finds NBA YoungBoy reflecting on issues in his life, including those related to his romance. Quando Rondo and Kevin Gates perform the second and third verses respectively.

== Music video ==
The music video was directed by Louie Knows and released on October 16, 2018. It finds the rappers roaming around a neighborhood as they rap, with YoungBoy lifting weights on a bench press in his front yard. The clip features animations of holographic images depicting them in their scenarios.

== Charts ==
| Chart (2018) | Peak position |
|---|---|
| US Billboard Hot 100 | 69 |
| US Hot R&B/Hip-Hop Songs (Billboard) | 24 |

== Certifications ==
| Region | Certification | Certified units/sales |
|---|---|---|
| United States (RIAA) | 2× Platinum | 2,000,000^{‡} |
^{‡} Sales+streaming figures based on certification alone.
