= Luh Kel =

American singer and rapper

- Born: Turran Coleman; May 20, 2002 (age 24); Tennessee, U.S.
- Origin: St. Louis, Missouri, U.S.
- Genres: R&B; hip hop
- Occupations: Singer; rapper; songwriter
- Years active: 2019–present
- Label: Cinematic
- Website: luhkel.com

Turran Coleman (born May 20, 2002), known professionally as Luh Kel, is an American singer and rapper. He gained popularity after releasing his debut single "Wrong" in 2019, which peaked at number 1 on the Bubbling Under Hot 100 Singles chart and spawned a remix with Lil Tjay. The official music video gained over 180 million views on YouTube.

== Early life ==
Kel was born in Tennessee but grew up in St. Louis, Missouri. He began freestyle rapping with his cousin Kai, and gained popularity on Instagram. He initially recorded songs in his grandparents' home. Kel was a member of the local R&B group, Project X.

== Career ==
Kel released his single "Wrong" on April 5, 2019. The song peaked at number 37 on the Billboard Hot R&B / Hip-Hop Songs chart. It was certified Platinum by RIAA. "Wrong" gained him global recognition, with the song being played worldwide, shared on streaming services and social media platforms like YouTube and TikTok.

== Discography ==
=== Studio albums ===
Title	Details	Peak chart positions			
Title	Details	US	US R&B	US Heat	US Indie
Mixed Emotions	Released: November 15, 2019; Label: Cinematic Music Group; Format: Digital download, Streaming	188	25	6	30
L.O.V.E.	Released: October 23, 2020; Label: Cinematic Music Group; Format: Digital download, Streaming	—	—	—	—

=== As lead artist ===
List of charted songs, showing year released and album name
Title	Year	Peak chart positions			Certifications	Album
Title	Year	US Bub.	US R&B/HH	US R&B	Certifications	Album
"Wrong" (solo or with Lil Tjay)	2019	1	37	7	RIAA: Platinum	Mixed Emotions
"BRB"	2019	—	—	—	RIAA: Gold	Mixed Emotions
"Old Me"	2019	—	—	—		Non album-single
"Pull Up"	2019	—	—	—	RIAA: Gold	Mixed Emotions
"Cold Heart"	2019	—	—	—		Mixed Emotions
"Movie" (featuring PnB Rock)	2019	—	—	—		Mixed Emotions
"Y.O.U."	2020	—	—	—		L.O.V.E.
"How To Love"	2020	—	—	—		L.O.V.E.
"Want You"	2020	—	—	—		L.O.V.E.
"Real"	2020	—	—	—		L.O.V.E.

=== Guest appearances ===
List of non-single guest appearances, with other performing artists, showing year released and album name
Title	Year	Other performer(s)	Album
"Dripped Out"	2020	Quando Rondo	QPac
