= From the Neighborhood to the Stage =

Mixtape by Quando Rondo
- Released: May 10, 2019
- Genre: Hip hop
- Length: 38:39
- Label: Never Broke Again; Atlantic
- Producer: Boyfifty; Brandon Finessin; Drum Dummie; Figurez Made It; FreshDuzIt; JD On Tha Track; KiddFreddo; Mook On The Beats; Pooh Beatz; Quay Global; Ruel Stop Playin; SephGotTheWaves; Tahj Money; TiaN; Vicasso; Zaytoven

Quando Rondo chronology
Life After Fame (2018)	From the Neighborhood to the Stage (2019)	QPac (2020)

Singles from From the Neighborhood to the Stage
- 1. "Gun Powder" Released: February 22, 2019; 2. "Scarred from Love" Released: March 15, 2019

From the Neighborhood to the Stage is the third mixtape by American rapper Quando Rondo. It was released by Never Broke Again and Atlantic Records Group, on May 10, 2019. The mixtape serves as a follow-up to Quando's first two 2018 releases, Life B4 Fame and Life After Fame. It features guest appearances from NoCap, Shy Glizzy, BlocBoy JB and Polo G. Production on the mixtape was handled by Quay Global, Zaytoven, Tahj Money, Mook On The Beats, JD On Tha Track, Pooh Beatz, and Figurez Made It, among others.

The mixtape was supported by three singles: "Gun Powder" and "Scarred from Love". The mixtape received generally favorable reviews and debuted at number 29 on the US Billboard 200 chart, with 17,000 album-equivalent units in its first week, dated May 25, 2019.

== Release and promotion ==
=== Singles ===
The music video for the song "Gun Powder" was released on February 2, 2019, and was released on February 22, 2019, for streaming and digital download, as the mixtape's lead single. The song was produced by Tahj Money and Mook On The Beats.

"Scarred from Love" was released on March 15, 2019, as the mixtape's second and final single. The music video for the song was released on April 12, 2019. The song was produced by Drum Dummie and Reuel Stop Playin.

=== Music video ===
The song from the mixtape, "Imperfect Flower", was released on May 9, 2019, before the mixtape's release.

== Critical reception ==
Professional ratings
Review scores
Source	Rating
AllMusic	3.5/5 stars

Fred Thomas of AllMusic commented, "the production is cleaner and feels more driven than earlier material, though he still gravitates towards moody piano loops and beats that combine meaty trap drums with softly creeping R&B elements". He also commented, "the rapper stays in one of two gears for much of the album: aggressive and threat-heavy flexing ("Out the Gym" and "Where I'm From") or mournfully reflecting on all the hardships he had to overcome ("Imperfect Flower" and "Emotional Way of Thinking")". The critic goes on to say that Quando "excels at both, but similar tempos, melodies, and production twists tend to blur songs of both types into one another".

== Track listing ==
Track listing and credits adapted from Genius, Spotify, and Tidal.

All tracks are written by Tyquian Bowman.

From the Neighborhood to the Stage track listing
No.	Title	Producer(s)	Length
1.	"Imperfect Flower"	TiaN	2:58
2.	"In My Section"	JD On Tha Track; Boyfifty	3:09
3.	"4th Qtr"	Quay Global	2:40
4.	"Out the Gym"	Pooh Beatz; Figurez Made It	2:40
5.	"New Ones" (featuring NoCap)	SephGotTheWaves; Vicasso	2:58
6.	"Gun Powder"	Tahj Money; Mook On The Beats	2:14
7.	"My Yoppa" (featuring Shy Glizzy)	Zaytoven	2:48
8.	"Dope Boy Dreams"	Brandon Finessin	3:24
9.	"Why We Can't"	Pooh Beatz; Figurez Made It	2:50
10.	"Emotional Way of Thinking"	KiddFreddo	2:47
11.	"Scarred from Love"	Drum Dummie; Ruel Stop Playin	3:27
12.	"Where I'm From" (featuring BlocBoy JB and Polo G)	FreshDuzIt	3:25
13.	"Lil Minute"	Mook On The Beats	3:06
Total length:			38:39

== Charts ==
Chart performance for From the Neighborhood to the Stage
Chart (2019)	Peak position
US Billboard 200	29
US Top R&B/Hip-Hop Albums (Billboard)	16
