= Baby on Baby =

Studio album by DaBaby
- Released: March 1, 2019
- Recorded: 2018–19
- Genres: Hip hop; trap
- Length: 31:36
- Labels: South Coast; Interscope; Alamo
- Producers: 1st Class; Cubeatz; Eddie Priest; FortyOneSix; Go Grizzly; James Maddocks; jetsonmade; Marii Beatz; Nick Mira; OJ Finessey; Pooh Beatz; Producer 20; Pyrex; Sean Da Firzt; SethInTheKitchen; Yung Lan

DaBaby chronology
Blank Blank (2018)	Baby on Baby (2019)	Kirk (2019)

Singles from Baby on Baby
- 1. "Suge" Released: April 23, 2019; 2. "Baby Sitter" Released: August 13, 2019

Baby on Baby is the debut studio album by American rapper DaBaby. It was released on March 1, 2019, by Interscope Records, Alamo Records, and South Coast Music Group. It features guest appearances from fellow rappers Offset, Rich Homie Quan, Rich the Kid and Stunna 4 Vegas.

== Release and promotion ==
A music video for "Baby Sitter" was released on April 3, 2019. A music video for "Pony" was released May 20, 2019. The songs "Walker Texas Ranger" and an alternate version of "Best Friend" without Rich the Kid were featured on DaBaby's previous mixtape Blank Blank.

=== Singles ===
"Suge" was released to rhythmic contemporary radio on April 23, 2019, as the album's lead single. A music video for "Suge" was released on March 4, 2019. The song has since peaked at number 7 on the US Billboard Hot 100 and at number 5 on the Hot R&B/Hip-Hop Songs chart. On May 15, 2019, the single was certified gold by the Recording Industry Association of America (RIAA) for sales of over 500,000 digital copies in the United States.

"Baby Sitter" featuring Offset was released to rhythmic contemporary radio on August 13, 2019, as the album's second single.

== Critical reception ==
Professional ratings
Review scores
Source	Rating
AllMusic	3.5/5 stars
HipHopDX	3.8/5
Pitchfork	7.7/10

Fred Thomas of AllMusic gave the album a positive review, saying "DaBaby's charm lies in how he's not even taking his irreverent cockiness too seriously, much less asking his audience to bow down to his greatness. Springy, uncluttered, and unable to contain its own grinning excitement, Baby on Baby zooms by in a captivating rush." Marcus Blackwell of HipHopDX rated the album 3.8 stars out of 5, saying "DaBaby has staked his claim as an artist by developing a compelling balance of street and lighthearted content that effectively highlights his personality. Baby On Baby at its best delivers an energetic, fun sound that stands out in rap's current landscape, making for a refreshing listen." Paul Thompson of Pitchfork, rating the album 7.7 out of 10, said "Baby on Baby comes in the middle of a prolific period for the rapper [...] the music is refreshingly without pretense or artifice, concerned less with the way it will play in boardrooms and more with the way it will play out of trunks."

== Commercial performance ==
The album debuted at number 25 on the Billboard 200 albums chart in the United States, before eventually rising to number 7. As of July 2019, the album has earned 473,000 equivalent album units.

== Track listing ==
Track listing adapted from Tidal.

No.	Title	Writer(s)	Producer(s)	Length
1.	"Taking It Out"	Jonathan Kirk; Anthony Mosley	Sean Da Firzt	1:58
2.	"Suge"	Kirk; Tahj Morgan; Darryl Clemons	jetsonmade; Pooh Beatz	2:43
3.	"Goin Baby"	Kirk; Morgan; Gavin Valencia; Eze Ugbor, Jr.	jetsonmade; OJ Finessey; Eddie Priest	2:21
4.	"Pony"	Kirk; Kedrick Cannady; Kevin Gomringer; Tim Gomringer	Pyrex; Cubeatz	3:24
5.	"Deal Wit It"	Kirk; Jamarii Massey; Jason Hernandez	MariiBeatz; FortyOneSix	1:08
6.	"Baby Sitter" (featuring Offset)	Kirk; Kiari Cephus; Massey; Kevin Price	Go Grizzly; MariiBeatz	2:37
7.	"Celebrate" (featuring Rich Homie Quan)	Kirk; Dequantes Lamar; Milan Modi; James Maddocks	Yung Lan; Maddocks	3:12
8.	"Joggers" (featuring Stunna 4 Vegas)	Kirk; Khalick Caldwell; Mosley	Sean Da Firzt	2:13
9.	"Carpet Burn"	Kirk; Morgan; Khaleel Griffin; Nicholas Mira	jetsonmade; 1st Class; Nick Mira	1:42
10.	"Best Friend" (featuring Rich the Kid)	Kirk; Dimitri Roger; Ross Portaro IV	SethInTheKitchen	3:06
11.	"Tupac"	Kirk; Morgan; Modi	jetsonmade; Yung Lan	1:54
12.	"Backend"	Kirk; Morgan	jetsonmade	2:46
13.	"Walker Texas Ranger"	Kirk; Antwain Fox	Producer 20	2:30
Total length:				31:36

== Charts ==
=== Weekly charts ===
Chart (2019)	Peak position
Canadian Albums (Billboard)	27
Latvian Albums (LAIPA)	30
US Billboard 200	7
US Top R&B/Hip-Hop Albums (Billboard)	3

=== Year-end charts ===
Chart (2019)	Position
Icelandic Albums (Plötutíóindi)	75
US Billboard 200	28
US Top R&B/Hip-Hop Albums (Billboard)	16
Chart (2020)	Position
US Billboard 200	107
US Top R&B/Hip-Hop Albums (Billboard)	62

=== Decade-end charts ===
Chart (2010–2019)	Position
US Billboard 200	172

== Certifications ==
Sales certifications for Baby on Baby
Region	Certification	Certified units/sales
United States (RIAA)	Platinum	1,000,000^{‡}
^{‡} Sales+streaming figures based on certification alone.
