= QPac =

Studio album by Quando Rondo
- Released: January 10, 2020
- Recorded: 2019–2020
- Length: 49:53
- Label: Never Broke Again; Atlantic
- Producer: 16yrold; Beezo; CashMoneyAP; C4; Danny Majic; DJ Swift; Drell on the Track; Einer Bankz; Figurez Made It; Go Grizzly; Hood Famous; India Got Them Beats; jetsonmade; Jonuel Colon; KC Supreme; MalikOTB; Mook; MP808; Neeko Baby; Pierre; Pliznaya; Pooh Beatz; Tahj Money; TJ Produced It; TnTXD

Quando Rondo chronology
From the Neighborhood to the Stage (2019)	QPac (2020)	Diary of a Lost Child (2020)

QPac is the debut studio album by American rapper Quando Rondo. It was released on January 10, 2020, by Never Broke Again and Atlantic Records, following his 2019 mixtape From the Neighborhood to the Stage. The album's name makes reference to 2Pac. It features guest appearances from 2 Chainz, A Boogie wit da Hoodie, Lil Durk, Luh Kel and Polo G. The album also features production from several prestigious artists such as CashMoneyAP, jetsonmade, MP808, Tahj Money, and TnTXD.

QPac was supported by five singles: "Just Keep Going", "Double C's", "Marvelous" featuring Polo G, "Collect Calls", and "Bad Vibe" featuring A Boogie wit da Hoodie and 2 Chainz. The album received generally positive reviews from music critics. It debuted at number 22 on the US Billboard 200 chart, earning 20,000 album-equivalent units in its first week.

== Critical reception ==
Professional ratings
Review scores
Source	Rating
AllMusic	3.5/5 stars

QPac received generally positive reviews from critics. Fred Thomas from AllMusic stated that "Quando Rondo sharpened his talents for his official studio debut, QPac." He further noted that "Quando expands on the sung/rapped style he broke through with." Concluding his review, Tomas notes that QPac is "the rapper's most versatile collection up to this point, QPac displays more versatility and considered production choices than his great but sometimes monotonous mixtapes."

== Track listing ==
QPac tracklisting
No.	Title	Producer(s)	Length
1.	"Blue Opps"	Pliznaya	2:06
2.	"Real Love"	Go Grizzly; Pooh Beatz	2:25
3.	"Double C's"	CashMoneyAP; 16yrold	2:34
4.	"Dripped Out" (featuring Luh Kel)	jetsonmade; Neeko Baby; Einer Bankz	3:12
5.	"Nothing Else Matters"	Hood Famous; Pooh Beatz	2:39
6.	"Poetic Justice"	DJ Swift; Mook; Jonuel Colon	2:58
7.	"Marvelous" (featuring Polo G)	MalikOTB; TnTXD; Tahj Money	3:30
8.	"Expensive Edibles"	C4	2:17
9.	"Collect Calls"	KC Supreme	2:38
10.	"Bad Vibe" (featuring A Boogie wit da Hoodie and 2 Chainz)	Danny Majic; Pierre	3:19
11.	"101"	Drell on the Track	3:23
12.	"Safest" (featuring Lil Durk)	TJ Produced It	3:54
13.	"Just Keep Going"	Beezo; MP808	2:05
14.	"Legitimate Drugz"	Go Grizzly	2:27
15.	"Perfect Timing"	Drell on the Track	2:21
16.	"Codeine Tales"	Figurez Made It; Pooh Beatz	2:41
17.	"Love or Lust"	Drell on the Track	2:16
18.	"Letter to My Daughter"	India Got Them Beats	3:10
Total length:			49:53

== Charts ==
Chart performance for QPac
Chart (2020)	Peak position
US Billboard 200	22
US Top R&B/Hip-Hop Albums (Billboard)	14
