= Suge (song) =

2019 single by DaBaby

Single by DaBaby

from the album Baby on Baby
- Released: April 23, 2019
- Recorded: 2018
- Genre: Trap
- Length: 2:43
- Label: Interscope; South Coast
- Songwriters: Jonathan Kirk; Tahj Morgan; Darryl Clemons
- Producers: jetsonmade; Pooh Beatz

DaBaby singles chronology
"Animal" (2018)	"Suge" (2019)	"Baby Shower" (2019)

Music video
- "Suge (Yea Yea)" on YouTube

"Suge" (also known as "Suge (Yea Yea)") is a song by American rapper DaBaby, released as the lead single from his debut studio album Baby on Baby on April 23, 2019. Produced by jetsonmade and Pooh Beatz, the song finds DaBaby comparing himself to former music executive Suge Knight.

"Suge" peaked number seven on the US Billboard Hot 100. It was nominated for Best Rap Performance and Best Rap Song at the 62nd Annual Grammy Awards. "Suge" was ranked as the 2nd best song of 2019 by Complex, and the 12th best by Billboard.

== Composition and lyrics ==
"Suge" contains "throbbing production", a beat that sounds like "ticking drums and a croaking synth-bass". The chorus contains a "yeah, yeah" interjection, hence the subtitle of the song. The song's lyrics have been described as "brazenly confident", with DaBaby rapping about keeping $32,000 in one of his pockets (and a Glock in the other), paired with "powerful vocal delivery, clever bars, and an oversize personality".

== Critical reception ==
The Washington Post said the song "showcases DaBaby's versatility" in sounding "suave" and then being able to "flip the switch". Noisey called the track "one of the album's best singles and a restless mess of lines", adding that DaBaby "free associates in a way that feels like Young Thug".

== Live performances ==
DaBaby performed the song, along with "Bop", on the December 7, 2019, episode of Saturday Night Live.

== Commercial performance ==
"Suge" debuted on the US Billboard Hot 100 at number 87 during the week of April 13, 2019, becoming DaBaby's first Hot 100 entry. Suge continued to climb the Hot 100 over the next several weeks, and has since peaked at number seven on the chart and at number three on the Hot R&B/Hip-Hop Songs chart. On June 23, 2019, the single was certified platinum by the Recording Industry Association of America (RIAA) for sales of over a million digital copies in the United States.

== Music video ==
The music video for "Suge" was released on March 4, 2019. It features DaBaby as a mailman, as well as in a muscle suit impersonating Suge Knight, and dancing in an office. The video also features an excerpt from the intro song to his previous album, "Taking It Out".

== Remix ==
On August 8, American rapper Joyner Lucas and Canadian rapper Tory Lanez ended their feud that started in 2018 by releasing a remix of the song together.

Nicki Minaj also made a non-official remix of the song premiering on her show, Queen Radio and also a snippet of her verse in an Instagram page.

== In popular culture ==
In 2021, memes related to the song blew up on social media such as Twitter. They included surrealist descriptions/depictions of DaBaby as a convertible, inspired by his lyrics in the song, where he stated: "I will turn a nigga into a convertible; Push me a lil' nigga top back (Vroom)." DaBaby was then noted for his apparent resemblance to a convertible. The sound effects and producer tags used in the song, such as ‘No Cap’ and ‘Oh Lord, jetsonmade Another One’ also became very popular.

== Charts ==
=== Weekly charts ===
Chart (2019)	Peak position
Australia (ARIA)	58
Belgium (Ultratip Bubbling Under Flanders)	36
Belgium Urban (Ultratop Flanders)	23
Canada Hot 100 (Billboard)	32
Ireland (IRMA)	65
Lithuania (AGATA)	36
New Zealand Hot Singles (RMNZ)	17
Sweden Heatseeker (Sverigetopplistan)	19
US Billboard Hot 100	7
US Hot R&B/Hip-Hop Songs (Billboard)	3
US R&B/Hip-Hop Airplay (Billboard)	1
US Rhythmic Airplay (Billboard)	2
US Rolling Stone Top 100	10

=== Year-end charts ===
Chart (2019)	Position
Canada (Canadian Hot 100)	75
US Billboard Hot 100	24
US Hot R&B/Hip-Hop Songs (Billboard)	11
US Rhythmic (Billboard)	24
US Rolling Stone Top 100	12

== Certifications ==
Region	Certification	Certified units/sales
Australia (ARIA)	Platinum	70,000^{‡}
Brazil (Pro-Música Brasil)	Platinum	40,000^{‡}
Canada (Music Canada)	Platinum	80,000^{‡}
Denmark (IFPI Danmark)	Gold	45,000^{‡}
New Zealand (RMNZ)	Platinum	30,000^{‡}
Portugal (AFP)	Gold	5,000^{‡}
United Kingdom (BPI)	Silver	200,000^{‡}
United States (RIAA)	4× Platinum	4,000,000^{‡}
^{‡} Sales+streaming figures based on certification alone.
