= Bop (DaBaby song) =

2019 single by DaBaby

Single by DaBaby

from the album Kirk
- Released: November 19, 2019
- Length: 2:39
- Label: Interscope; South Coast
- Songwriter(s): Jonathan Kirk; Tahj Morgan; Anton Mendo
- Producer(s): JetsonMade; Starboy

DaBaby singles chronology
"1+1" (2019)	"Bop" (2019)	"fish" (2019)

Music video
- "Bop" on YouTube

"Bop" (stylized in all caps) is a song by American rapper DaBaby, released to US rhythmic contemporary radio through Interscope Records and South Coast Music Group on November 19, 2019, as the second single from DaBaby's sophomore album Kirk (2019). It peaked at number 11 on the US Billboard Hot 100. The song received a nomination for Best Rap Performance at the 63rd Annual Grammy Awards.

The popular game Fortnite has used this song two times for 2 different Fortnite emotes, which both cost 500 V-Bucks respectfully. The 2 emotes are named Go Mufasa, and Jabba Switchway.

== Live performances ==
DaBaby performed the song as a part of a medley with "Intro" and "Really" on The Tonight Show Starring Jimmy Fallon on September 30, 2019, to promote Kirk.

DaBaby performed the song, along with "Suge", on the December 7, 2019, episode of Saturday Night Live.

== Music video ==
The music video was released on November 16, 2019, and was directed by Reel Goats. It is styled as a "Broadway hip-hop musical" and features a flash mob as well as American dance crew the Jabbawockeez. James Rico, the head of the production team Reel Goats, stated that he was inspired by the intro sequences of Austin Powers and how people would want to dance around the title character. Rico went on to say that he wanted to recreate that same feeling of community in the music video, drawing additional inspiration from Rocky, with the end goal being a "rap version of" the intro scene from La La Land.

== Charts ==
=== Weekly charts ===
Chart (2019–2020)	Peak position
Australia (ARIA)	63
Belgium (Ultratip Bubbling Under Flanders)	8
Belgium (Ultratip Bubbling Under Wallonia)	25
Canada (Canadian Hot 100)	23
France (SNEP)	84
Ireland (IRMA)	39
Netherlands (Single Top 100)	100
New Zealand (Recorded Music NZ)	38
Portugal (AFP)	49
Sweden Heatseeker (Sverigetopplistan)	5
Switzerland (Schweizer Hitparade)	49
UK Singles (OCC)	66
US Billboard Hot 100	11
US Hot R&B/Hip-Hop Songs (Billboard)	4
US Rhythmic (Billboard)	2
US Rolling Stone Top 100	3

=== Year-end charts ===
Chart (2020)	Position
Canada (Canadian Hot 100)	70
US Billboard Hot 100	29
US Hot R&B/Hip-Hop Songs (Billboard)	14
US Rhythmic (Billboard)	23

== Certifications ==
Region	Certification	Certified units/sales
Australia (ARIA)	Platinum	70,000^{‡}
Brazil (Pro-Música Brasil)	Diamond	160,000^{‡}
Denmark (IFPI Danmark)	Gold	45,000^{‡}
France (SNEP)	Platinum	200,000^{‡}
Italy (FIMI)	Gold	35,000^{‡}
New Zealand (RMNZ)	2× Platinum	60,000^{‡}
Poland (ZPAV)	Gold	25,000^{‡}
Portugal (AFP)	Platinum	10,000^{‡}
Spain (PROMUSICAE)	Gold	30,000^{‡}
United Kingdom (BPI)	Gold	400,000^{‡}
United States (RIAA)	3× Platinum	3,000,000^{‡}
Streaming
Greece (IFPI Greece)	Platinum	2,000,000^{†}
^{‡} Sales+streaming figures based on certification alone.^{†} Streaming-only figures based on certification alone.

== Release history ==
Country	Date	Format	Label	Ref.
Various	September 27, 2019	Digital download; streaming	South Coast Music Group; Interscope	
United States	November 19, 2019	Rhythmic contemporary radio	South Coast Music Group; Interscope	
United States	February 11, 2020	Contemporary hit radio	South Coast Music Group; Interscope	
