= Quando Rondo =

American rapper (born 1999)

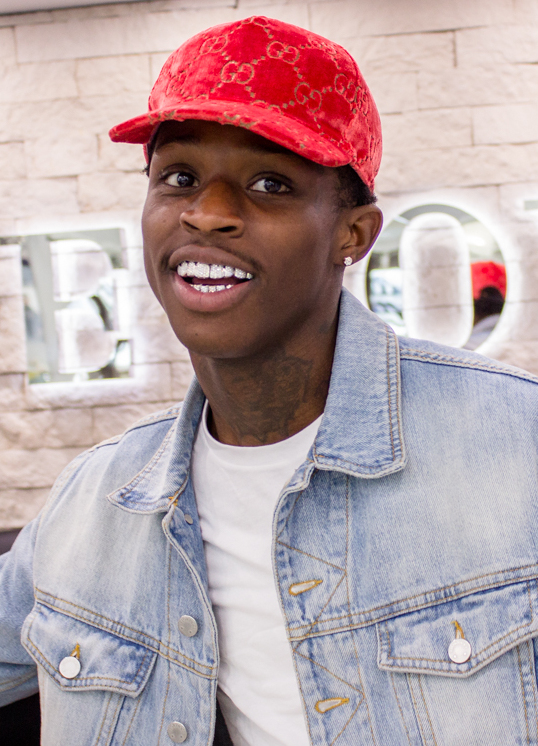
- Bowman in 2019

Background information
- Also known as: Ty-Quando; Q-Pac; QRN
- Born: Tyquian Terrel Bowman; March 23, 1999 (age 27); Savannah, Georgia, U.S.
- Genres: Southern hip-hop; trap; gangsta rap; mumble rap
- Occupations: Rapper; songwriter; singer
- Works: Quando Rondo discography
- Years active: 2017–present
- Labels: Atlantic; Never Broke Again
- Website: quandorondoofficial.com

Tyquian Terrel Bowman (born March 23, 1999), better known by his stage name Quando Rondo, is an American rapper, singer, and songwriter. He signed with YoungBoy Never Broke Again's namesake record label, an imprint of Atlantic Records shortly after the release of his 2018 single, "I Remember" (featuring Lil Baby). The song received platinum certification by the Recording Industry Association of America (RIAA) and preceded his debut studio album, QPac (2020), which entered the Billboard 200 and contained his second platinum-certified song, "ABG". His second and third albums are Recovery (2023) and Here for a Reason (2024).

== Early life ==
Tyquian Bowman was born and raised in Savannah, Georgia. Before developing an interest in music, Bowman participated in track and field during his high school years. As a teenager, he spent some time in juvenile detention centers. In 2017, he spent months in county jail and was released in October. At that time, he decided to pursue music full-time. During his teenage years, he also joined the Savannah and Atlanta subset of the Rollin' 60s Neighborhood Crips.

His stage name is a play on his nickname, "Quando". He is also a fan of basketball player Rajon Rondo. He grew up listening to Chief Keef, Rich Homie Quan, Young Thug, and Camoflauge.

== Career ==
=== 2017–2019: Career beginnings, Life B4 Fame, Life After Fame and From the Neighborhood to the Stage ===
Bowman adopted his stage name "Quando Rondo" in 2017. It derives from his nickname "Ty-Quando" and "Rondo" was added as he liked the sound of it. Quando's earliest song is dated back to March 1, 2017, after uploading a track titled "Gangsta Bitch" directly to his official SoundCloud page.

In November 2017, after being released from jail, he made a freestyle that he wrote while incarcerated titled "I Remember" on YouTube, which went viral quickly. In January 2018, he released the song "I Remember", featuring rapper Lil Baby. He followed that up with the release of the songs "Motivation" and "Paradise". The videos for all three songs accumulated millions of views on YouTube. This led to the release of his debut mixtape Life B4 Fame on April 17, 2018. Guest appearances such as Lil Baby, Lil Durk, and OMB Peezy. The mixtape also featured Quando's viral track, "ABG" which has accumulated over 71 million views on WorldStarHipHop's official YouTube channel.

In June 2018, Quando Rondo released the single "Kiccin' Shit". Later that month, it was announced that he was the first signee to YoungBoy Never Broke Again's Atlantic Records imprint, Never Broke Again. Following the announcement, Quando's Life B4 Fame was re-released through the NBA, Atlantic imprint.

In August of that year, he and Kevin Gates were featured on the YoungBoy Never Broke Again song, "I Am Who They Say I Am". The following month, Quando Rondo was featured on three of the four tracks of YoungBoy Never Broke Again's 4Loyalty EP.

On September 24, 2018, Quando Rondo released his single mixtape, Life After Fame, a sequel to his debut. The album featured guest verses from Boosie Badazz, JayDaYoungan, Rich Homie Quan, Shy Glizzy, YK Osiris, and NBA YoungBoy. The mixtape proceeded to peak at #174 on the Billboard 200, marking his first entry. He went on to open for SOB X RBE on select tour dates in the United States on their "Global Gangin" tour, which was scheduled to end in December 2018.

In February 2019, Quando Rondo released the single "Scarred from Love", which appeared on his third mixtape, From the Neighborhood to the Stage, released on May 10, 2019. The mixtape features guest appearances from BlocBoy JB, NoCap, Polo G and Shy Glizzy.

=== 2020–2021: Career controversies, QPac, Diary of a Lost Child and Still Taking Risks ===
He released his debut studio album, QPac, on January 10, 2020, through Never Broke Again and Atlantic. The album features guest appearances from 2 Chainz, A Boogie wit da Hoodie, Lil Durk, Luh Kel, and Polo G. The album was preceded by five singles, "Just Keep Going", "Double C's", "Marvelous" featuring Polo G, "Collect Calls", "Bad Vibe" featuring 2 Chainz and A Boogie wit da Hoodie.

Quando's fourth mixtape Diary of a Lost Child was released on August 26, 2020, in the middle of the week, on a Wednesday. Months later, on December 4, 2020, Quando released a YouTube exclusive mixtape, Before My Time Up.

Following months of controversy surrounding his involvement in King Von's death, Quando released his sixth mixtape, Still Taking Risks, on May 7, 2021. The mixtape has no features, consisting of 15 tracks and three bonus records.

=== 2022–present: 3860, Recovery, and Here for a Reason ===
On November 25, 2022, Quando teamed up with YoungBoy Never Broke Again for their collaborative mixtape, 3860. The mixtape was preceded by four singles, "Give Me a Sign," Cream Soda" (Performed by Quando), "Keep Me Dry," and "It's On." Despite the project being uploaded to YoungBoy's YouTube channel, on the day of the mixtape's release, YoungBoy revealed that he did not want the mixtape to be released due to his past disputes with Atlantic Records, the label under which the mixtape was released under, subsequently leading to the removal of the mixtape from YoungBoy's YouTube channel. YoungBoy further noted that Quando respected his wishes for the mixtape to not be released, however, Atlantic Records proceeded to release the project.

"Give Me a Sign", with YoungBoy, would appear on Quando Rondo's second studio album, Recovery, on the twentieth track, marking the album's lead single. Four other singles would be released prior to the album. "Speeding", the album's second single was released on January 22, 2023. "Long Live Pabb", the album's third single dedicated to the death of Lul Pab was released just a day later on January 23, 2023. "Me First", the album's fourth single was released on February 15, 2023. The album's final single, "Tear It Down", was released on March 9, 2023, prior to the album's official announcement.

On November 15, 2024, Quando released his third studio album, Here for a Reason, featuring a sole guest appearance from Winter Rae. The album was preceded by the sampler EP, Here for a Reason: In The Darkest Time, released in August of the same year, and by three singles, "Cash", "Gotta Do Better & Pray", and "Luh Wodie".

== Legal issues ==
=== 2019: Assault lawsuit ===
On March 12, 2019, it was reported that Rondo and YoungBoy Never Broke Again had a suit filed by a man claiming to be the rappers' bodyguard, tour manager and/or tour DJ for assault, battery and emotional distress. The lawsuit claims that on December 21, 2018, during a concert in Florence, South Carolina, the two performers were annoyed by a crazed fan resulting in an argument. The claimant states that he, Gaulden, Bowman and members of their entourage were escorted backstage by management, venue owners and concert organizers where he claims to have been assaulted by the two aforementioned. The person, who claimed he was confronted by the two defendants, commented that Bowman (although unprovoked) instigated the incident by attempting to force him back onstage to break up the fan craze to secure his team, but after he refused, Bowman and Gaulden immediately assaulted him as he tried to explain to both parties of his deeds. It resulted in the victim sustaining a "cracked tooth, bloody face and injuries to his reputation". Gaulden's attorney stated that he had no prior knowledge of the incident but would look into the outcome of the lawsuit.

=== 2020: Altercation and death of King Von ===
On November 6, 2020, an altercation broke out between the crews of rappers King Von and Quando Rondo outside of the Monaco Hookah Lounge in Atlanta, leading to a shoot-out that left King Von dead. Quando and his entourage claimed that they were acting in self-defense and that Von was the aggressor; TMZ reported that previous to the brawl, Quando was napping in a car outside of the nightclub, awaking to find King Von and his crew aggressively approaching him and his associates. Footage of the altercation would later come out the same day of the shooting showing Von throwing punches at Quando Rondo prior to the gunfight. Surveillance videos also showed Rondo helping Von's shooter, Timothy "Lul Timm" Leeks, get to the hospital afterwards.

Quando Rondo publicly remained silent on the incident until two weeks later, when he released his song "End of Story", which was assumed to be a reference to Von's song trilogy, "Crazy Story". In the song, he recalls the shooting and addresses his involvement. In the song, he again states that he was defending himself and even shows support for Lul Timm, who was charged for the murder of King Von. In April 2021, Quando denied that the song was a diss toward Von, and claimed he did not know that Von had songs with that title. Despite receiving strong criticism, Quando has continued to publicly support Leeks.

=== 2022–2024: state drug charges and federal gang-related arrest ===
In June 2023, Bowman was arrested in Chatham County, Georgia, and indicted on charges related to drug sales and gang activity. Prosecutors allege Bowman has a leadership role in the Rollin' 60s Neighborhood Crips gang and that he is involved in the sale of marijuana. Bowman was released on a $100,000 bond following his arrest, after Atlantic Records representatives showed up in court. However, on July 19, 2023, weeks after being granted bond, Bowman was in a car crash and showed signs of an overdose. Prosecutors filed a motion to have Bowman's bond revoked; the motion was rejected but Bowman was barred from driving until his trial is complete.

On December 9, 2023, months after being released on bond, Bowman was arrested by the FBI regarding federal drug charges despite being on bond for state drug charges. On December 21, Bowman was released from federal custody on a $100,000 bond and was placed on house arrest awaiting trial.

On February 6, 2024, Bowman was arrested and charged with a DUI and reckless driving. He was released on a $4,600 bond. On June 25, the United States Department of Justice announced that Bowman had reached a plea agreement regarding his federal drug charges. On August 13, Bowman entered a guilty plea regarding his federal drug charges. On December 12, Bowman was sentenced to 33 months in a federal prison, followed by 3 years of supervised release, alongside a $40,000 fine, beginning on January 10, 2025.

==== Los Angeles shooting ====
On August 19, 2022, Bowman and his cousin Saviay’a 'Lul Pabb' Robinson were shot at in a gas station in Los Angeles, killing Robinson. On October 23, 2024, Lil Durk, Kavon Grant, Deandre Wilson, Keith Jones, David Lindsey, and Asa Houston were arrested and have been indicted for conspiracy to commit murder-for-hire, committing murder-for-hire involving a death, and the use of a machine gun in a violent crime resulting in death in connection with the attack on Bowman and the death of Robinson. All five defendants were affiliates of Durk's Only the Family record label. The shooting was allegedly revenge for the 2020 altercation which resulted in death of King Von, with prosecutors for the case noting that flights and rental cars for the accused which would place them at the shooting were paid for with a credit card tied to the label.

== Personal life ==
Bowman is a Muslim and has one daughter.

== Discography ==
Studio albums

- QPac (2020)
- Recovery (2023)
- Here for a Reason (2024)
