= YNW Melly discography =

Hip hop recording artist discography

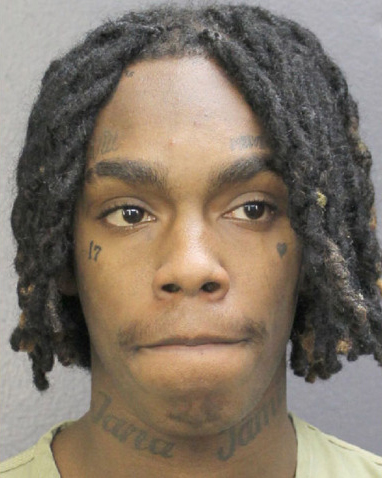
- YNW Melly's February 2019 mugshot
- Studio albums: 3
- EPs: 2
- Singles: 29
- Mixtapes: 2

The discography of American rapper YNW Melly consists of three studio albums, two mixtapes, one extended play, and twenty-nine singles (including seventeen as a featured artist).

Melly was born and raised in Gifford, Florida, and criminal activity stemming from the area's violence rate is frequently discussed in his subject matter. In 2017, he released four singles leading up to his debut extended play (EP), Collect Calls, which was released in December of that year. The EP received regional attention, and contained a guest appearance from California rapper Lil B, as well as a then-unknown fellow Floridian, singer Rod Wave. Also in March of that year, he released the song "Murder on My Mind" on SoundCloud, which would receive viral popularity online during the following year. A sleeper hit, the song eventually peaked at number 14 on the Billboard Hot 100, prompting 300 Entertainment to sign the rapper and re-release it as a single in promotion for Melly's debut mixtape, I Am You (2018).

The mixtape, released in August 2018, saw generally positive reviews and marked the rapper's first entry on the Billboard 200—at number 20. The mixtape also spawned four other singles, including the platinum-certified local hit "Virtual (Blue Balenciagas)". His follow-up mixtape, We All Shine, was released in January 2019, preceded by the underperforming promotional single "Butter Pecan". A track off the mixtape, "Mixed Personalities" (featuring Kanye West) became his second song to reach viral status, supported in part by a Cole Bennett-directed video coinciding with the mixtape's release. A month later, Melly was arrested for two counts of premeditated murder stemming from a shooting in October 2018, in which YNW Juvy and YNW Sakchaser—two characters often mentioned in Melly's lyrics—were shot and killed. Some believe the criminal activity documented in the lyrics of "Murder on My Mind" served as an attestation of his involvement, however, the song was recorded over a year prior to the incident.

While incarcerated, Melly briefly maintained commercial success. Much of his subsequent releases would consist of material he had recorded in 2018, such as his next single, "223's" (featuring 9lokkNine). The gangsta rap song was originally featured on a mixtape by the artist credited as a guest feature, but was given to Melly as a lead performer for a commercial release. It reached number 34 on the Hot 100 and preceded the long-delayed release of Melly's debut studio album, Melly vs. Melvin in November 2019. The album peaked at number eight on the Billboard 200 and became his most successful project, although many critics considered it inferior to his previous material. In March of the following year, the album spawned a second single: "Suicidal".

The heartbreak-grieving record first gained popularity from TikTok, as Melly posted a video of late Illinois rapper Juice Wrld recording a remix of the song prior to his death the same day. The official remix featuring the artist was released in March 2020 and peaked at number 20 on the Hot 100, and also landed at number 75 on the Billboard Year-End charts. 300 Entertainment released his second album, Just a Matter of Slime in August 2021 to similar commercial success despite a further decline in critical reception—with critics disparaging the use of recycled material. The only song from the album that entered the Billboard Hot 100 was "Mind of Melvin" (featuring Lil Uzi Vert) at number 78. As of October 6, 2026, the trial of YNW Melly is still awaiting a verdict. If convicted, Melly faces life imprisonment or the death penalty.

== Studio albums ==
Title	Album details	Peak chart positions						Certifications
Title	Album details	US	US R&B/ HH	US Rap	CAN	NLD	NOR	Certifications
Melly vs. Melvin	Released: November 22, 2019; Label: 300; Formats: Digital download, streaming	8	3	3	17	81	39	RIAA: Gold
Just a Matter of Slime	Released: August 13, 2021; Label: 300; Formats: Digital download, streaming	11	5	4	44	—	—	
Young New Wave	Released: April 19, 2024; Label: YNW4L; Formats: Digital download, streaming	—	—	—	—	—	—	

== Mixtapes ==
Title	Mixtape details	Peak chart positions				Certifications
Title	Mixtape details	US	US R&B/ HH	US Rap	CAN	Certifications
I Am You	Released: August 3, 2018; Label: 300; Formats: Digital download, streaming	20	12	12	18	RIAA: Gold
We All Shine	Released: January 18, 2019; Label: 300; Format: Digital download, streaming	27	17	17	56	RIAA: Gold

== Extended plays ==
Title	EP details
Collect Call	Released: December 20, 2017; Label: 100K; Formats: Digital download, streaming

== Singles ==
=== As lead artist ===
Title	Year	Peak chart positions								Certifications	Album
Title	Year	US	US R&B/HH	US Rap	AUS	CAN	NZ	SWE	UK	Certifications	Album
"Legendary (Remix)" (featuring John Wicks)	2017	—	—	—	—	—	—	—	—		Collect Call
"Catching Feelings"	2017	—	—	—	—	—	—	—	—		Collect Call
"Florida Water" (featuring JGreen)	2017	—	—	—	—	—	—	—	—		Collect Call
"First Day Out. First Day In."	2017	—	—	—	—	—	—	—	—		Collect Call
"Melly the Menace"	2018	—	—	—	—	—	—	—	—		Collect Call
"Virtual (Blue Balenciagas)"	2018	—	—	—	—	—	—	—	—	RIAA: Platinum	I Am You
"Slang That Iron"	2018	—	—	—	—	—	—	—	—		I Am You
"Whodie"	2018	—	—	—	—	—	—	—	—		Non-album single
"Murder on My Mind"	2018	14	7	7	57	9	18	39	20	RIAA: 6× Platinum; ARIA: Platinum; BPI: Platinum	I Am You
"4 Real"	2018	—	—	—	—	—	—	—	—		I Am You
"Versatile"	2018	—	—	—	—	—	—	—	—		Non-album single
"Medium Fries"	2018	—	—	—	—	—	—	—	—		Collect Call
"772 Love"	2018	—	—	—	—	—	—	—	—	BPI: Silver	Collect Call
"Till the End" (featuring Skooly)	2018	—	—	—	—	—	—	—	—		Collect Call
"Butter Pecan"	2018	—	—	—	—	—	—	—	—	RIAA: Platinum	We All Shine
"Freddy Krueger" (featuring Tee Grizzley or Tee Grizzley and Future)	2018	—	—	—	—	—	—	—	—	RIAA: Platinum	Non-album singles
"223's" (featuring 9lokkNine)	2019	34	17	14	56	27	38	94	69	RIAA: 2× Platinum; BPI: Silver	Melly vs. Melvin
"Gang"	2019	—	—	—	—	—	—	—	—		Non-album singles
"Suicidal" (solo or featuring Juice Wrld)	2020	20	11	7	50	29	—	71	37	RIAA: 4× Platinum; ARIA: Gold; BPI: Gold	Melly vs. Melvin
"Banana Split" (with Murda Beatz featuring Lil Durk)	2020	—	—	—	—	—	—	—	—		Non-album singles
"Thugged Out" (featuring Kodak Black)	2021	— (Note: "Thugged Out" did not enter the Billboard Hot 100, but peaked at number 22 on the Bubbling Under Hot 100 chart.)	—	—	—	—	—	—	—		Just a Matter of Slime
"Na Na Na Boo Boo"	2021	—	—	—	—	—	—	—	—		Just a Matter of Slime
"Pieces" (featuring Queen Naija)	2021	—	—	—	—	—	—	—	—		Just a Matter of Slime
"Yung N**** Shit" (featuring YNW Gunna and Hotboii)	2021	—	—	—	—	—	—	—	—		Just a Matter of Slime
"Best Friends 4L" (featuring Lil Tjay)	2021	—	—	—	—	—	—	—	—		Just a Matter of Slime
"772 Love, Pt. 3 (Your Love)" (with YNW BSlime and YNW4L)	2024	—	—	—	—	—	—	—	—		Young New Wave
"—" denotes a recording that did not chart or was not released in that territory.

=== As a featured artist ===
Title	Year	Album
"Sushii Gang" (Tiurakh$ushii featuring YNW Melly)	2018	Non-album singles
"4 Everybody" (Lil Polo Da Don featuring YNW Melly, JGreen, and Schooly)	2018	Non-album singles
"Nightmares at the Bottom" (Burga featuring YNW Melly)	2018	Keep That Same Energy
"Twin #3" (YNW SakChaser featuring YNW Melly & 9lokkNine)	2018	Non-album singles
"Facetime" (Aly Ryan featuring YNW Melly)	2018	Non-album singles
"BackEnd" (YNW SakChaser featuring YNW Melly & YNW Peso)	2018	Non-album singles
"Just Woke Up" (Supreme Patty featuring YNW Melly)	2018	Non-album singles
"Murk Sum" (Petho Burr featuring YNW Melly & Fredo Bang)	2018	Non-album singles
"Just Woke Up" (Draco Wave featuring YNW Melly & Supreme Patty)	2018	Non-album singles
"Maserati" (Foolie featuring YNW Melly)	2019	Non-album singles
"No Chillin (Get to That Gwap)" (RBM Bonez featuring YNW Melly & Rod Wave)	2019	Non-album singles
"We Want Smoke" (Tray Plus featuring YNW Melly & JayDaYoungan)	2019	Non-album singles
"Gave You My All" (BTR Chris featuring YNW Melly)	2019	Non-album singles
"Miami Vibe" (A1Gento featuring YNW Melly & Jay Maly)	2019	Non-album singles
"Pull Up" (Lil Keed featuring Lil Uzi Vert and YNW Melly)	2019	Long Live Mexico
"100k Cypher 2" (100K Track featuring FCG Heem, Slatt Zy, Ar'Mon & Trey, and YNW Melly)	2021	Non-album single
"No Love" (100k Track & Ar'mon & Trey featuring YNW Melly)	2021	Trapped In Blues
"Slums" (100k Track featuring YNW Melly)	2022	Mercury
"The Mob" (YNW BSlime featuring YNW Melly, Trippie Redd & YNW Bortlen)	2022	Non-album single
"Brazy" (Fredo Bang featuring YNW Melly)	2022	Two-Face Bang 2

== Other charted and certified songs ==
Title	Year	Peak chart positions					Certifications	Album
Title	Year	US	US R&B/sHH	CAN	NZ Hot	UK	Certifications	Album
"Mama Cry"	2018	— (Note: "Mama Cry" did not enter the Billboard Hot 100, but peaked at number 14 on the Bubbling Under Hot 100 chart.)	—	—	—	—	RIAA: Platinum; BPI: Silver	I Am You
"Mind on My Murder"	2018	—	—	—	—	—	RIAA: Gold	I Am You
"Mixed Personalities" (featuring Kanye West)	2019	42	19	51	—	97	RIAA: 2× Platinum; BPI: Silver	We All Shine
"City Girls"	2019	—	—	—	—	—	RIAA: Gold	We All Shine
"No Heart"	2019	—	—	—	—	—	RIAA: Gold	We All Shine
"6 Kiss" (Trippie Redd featuring Juice Wrld and YNW Melly)	2019	60	28	64	15	—	RIAA: Platinum	A Love Letter to You 4
"Young Grizzley World" (Tee Grizzley featuring A Boogie wit da Hoodie and YNW Melly)	2019	—	—	—	—	—	RIAA: Platinum	Scriptures
"Bang Bang"	2019	— (Note: "Bang Bang" did not enter the Billboard Hot 100, but peaked at number 7 on the Bubbling Under Hot 100 chart.)	—	—	28	—		Melly vs. Melvin
"Two Face"	2019	— (Note: "Two Face" did not enter the Billboard Hot 100, but peaked at number 22 on the Bubbling Under Hot 100 chart.)	—	—	—	—		Melly vs. Melvin
"Mind of Melvin" (featuring Lil Uzi Vert)	2021	78	25	96	35	—		Just a Matter of Slime
"Take Kare" (featuring Lil Baby and Lil Durk)	2021	— (Note: "Take Kare" did not enter the Billboard Hot 100, but peaked at number 20 on the Bubbling Under Hot 100 chart.)	—	—	—	—		Just a Matter of Slime
"—" denotes a recording that did not chart or was not released in that territory.

== Guest appearances ==
List of other non-single guest appearances, with other performing artists, showing year released and album name
Title	Year	Other artist(s)	Album
"Homicicde"	2018	Project Youngin	Resurrected
"I'm Rollin"	2018	Paper Lovee	Waiting to Exhale
"Speed up My Wrist"	2018	Bossman JD	Fox World
"Chiefin"	2018	Fredo Bang	2 Face Bang
"Lost and Found"	2018	Tee Grizzley	Still My Moment
"Game"	2018	Only The Family, Lil Durk, Tee Grizzley, Sada Baby	Lil Durk Presents: Only the Family Involved, Vol. 2
"Young Grizzley World"	2019	Fredo Bang	Big Ape
"Young Grizzley World"	2019	Tee Grizzley, A Boogie wit da Hoodie	Scriptures
"100 Shells"	2019	Yung Bans	Misunderstood
"6 Kiss"	2019	Trippie Redd, Juice WRLD	A Love Letter to You 4
"Rollin"	2020	King Von	Levon James
"Air It Out"	2020	Fredo Bang	Most Hated
"Free Jamell"	2020	Lil Durk	The Voice
"Really Be Slime"	2021	Young Stoner Life, Bslime, FN DaDealer	Slime Language 2
"Careless"	2021	Tee Grizzley	Built For Whatever
"Make You Sick"	2021	Project Youngin, Foolio	Letter From The Projects
"No Love Too"	2022	100k Track, FCG Heem, DKE AUTHOR, Toosii	Mercury
