= Use of lyrics as evidence =

As of 2026, more than 800 criminal cases in the United States have used lyrics as evidence. They are typically used to establish character, intent, or motive. Hip-hop lyrics have primarily been used, with first know instance of lyrics being used as evidence, being of hip-hop. Lyrics have since been used as evidence in the trials of rappers such as Tay-K, Young Thug, and YNW Melly, among others. Its use has been criticized.

== History ==
The first known instance of hip-hop lyrics being used was in United States v. Foster (1991). Illinois resident Derek Foster, the defendant, was charged with Possession with the Intent to Distribute, after police found cocaine in his luggage as he exited a train. When searched, police found the lyrics "[k]ey for key, pound for pound. I'm the biggest dope dealer and I serve all over town" written in a notebook, for a song he planned to record later. Foster argued the lyrics described fictional events, though the United States Court of Appeals for the Seventh Circuit saw the lyrics as motive and upheld his conviction.

In State v. Cheeseboro (2001), Felix Cheeseboro of South Carolina was charged with armed robbery and murder. He wrote the song "The Ruckus" while awaiting trial, which described shooting and murder in several lyrics. The lyrics were seen as too ambiguous and the evidence was dismissed. Cook v. State (2001) reached the Arkansas Supreme Court, an aggravated robbery case which also used lyrics as evidence. Despite having similarly ambiguous lyrics, he was found guilty. The Kentucky Supreme Court also upheld the use of lyrics in Greene V. Commonwealth (2006), though the defendant's lyrics were more descript than those of his precedents.

In Broadnax v. State (2009), after James Broadnax had been convicted for murder, prosecutors at the sentencing hearing submitted lyrics written by him. After reading the lyrics, the nearly all-white jury sentenced him to the death penalty instead of life without parole.

New Jersey v. Skinner (2014) is the primary precedent used when presenting lyrics as evidence. In 2008, Vonte Skinner was charged with murdering a rival drug dealer. He claimed to have been a witness, though not the murderer. Prosecutors used lyrics he wrote prior to the shooting as evidence, which were found in a notebook in the backseat of his car. The Supreme Court of New Jersey held that the lyrics were fictional, and that lyrics as evidence "[bear] little or no probative value as to any motive or intent behind the attempted murder offense with which [one is] charged".

In 2017, Tay-K had his lyrics presented as evidence, namely "The Race", which he had released while on the run from police.

In 2023, the prosecution in the YSL Records racketeering trial were granted access to play the music of Young Thug, which led to the song "Lifestyle" being played in the courtroom on January 11. It has been criticized as a double standard. Also in 2023, the prosecution in the trial of YNW Melly planned to introduce 55 of YNW Melly's songs – including "Murder on My Mind" – four album covers, and eighteen other recordings as evidence.

Other rappers who have had their lyrics used as evidence include Mac Dre (1992), Snoop Dogg (1996), Big Lurch (2002), Boosie Badazz (2012), Bobby Shmurda (2014), Drakeo the Ruler (2018), and 6ix9ine (2019).

=== Legislation ===
On July 27, 2022, the Restoring Artistic Protection Act (RAP Act) was introduced to the United States House of Representatives by congressmen Jamaal Bowman and Hank Johnson. The bill would have expanded the First Amendment protections of musicians and prohibited the use of song lyrics as evidence. The bill died, though was reintroduced to the house by sponsors from Johnson and Sydney Kamlager-Dove, with support from the nonprofit Free Our Art. The law has passed in the state legislatures of California and Louisiana, and has been introduced in the state legislatures of Maryland, Missouri, New Hampshire, and New York.

== Analysis ==
The use of lyrics as court evidence is controversial.

It has been argued that the commercialization of hip-hop and the push for more violent lyrics in the industry has led to rappers lying and exaggerating their lyrics. A distinction between the artist as an individual and the artist in their art is needed, as the actions described in their lyrics are often hyperbolic and metaphorical. Literal interpretation – typical practice when lyrics are presented as evidence – should not be done because of this. Its use as character evidence is also discouraged for this reason.

The use of lyrics as evidence has been argued to be done as a result of racism in United States courts, as it has primarily been used in cases against rappers. Hip-hop lyrics, which are stereotypically violent and dangerous, are used in order to depict defendants as such. The protection of lyrics under the First Amendment to the United States Constitution have been cited as reason against its use as evidence. In 2024, the documentary As We Speak was released, which too argued that its use is racist.

As of April 2026, rap lyrics have been used as evidence in at least 826 cases. 33 of the cases ended in death sentences.

== See also ==
- Elonis v. United States
