= Fredo Bang discography =

- Fredo Bang in 2026
- Studio albums: 1
- Compilation albums: 2
- Singles: 44
- Mixtapes: 7

The discography of American rapper Fredo Bang consists of a studio album, two compilation albums, seven mixtapes, and forty-four singles.

== Albums ==
=== Studio albums ===
Title	Album details	Peak chart positions
Title	Album details	US
Most Hated	Released: April 17, 2020; Label: Se Lavi, Def Jam; Format: Digital download, streaming	110
Yes, I'm Sad	Released: January 18, 2024; Label: Se Lavi, Def Jam; Format: Digital download, streaming	—N/a

=== Compilation albums ===
List of albums
Title	Album details
Lost Files	Released: July 4, 2018; Label: Bang Biz Ent., LLC, Create Music Group; Format: Digital download, streaming
Steppa Music	Released: March 19, 2021; Label: Se Lavi, Def Jam; Format: Digital download, streaming

== Mixtapes ==
Title	Mixtape details	Peak chart positions		
Title	Mixtape details	US	US R&B/HH	US Rap
2 Face Bang	Released: October 31, 2018; Label: Self-released; Format: Digital download, streaming	—	—	—
Big Ape	Released: April 19, 2019; Label: Self-released; Format: Digital download, streaming	—	—	—
Pain Made Me Numb	Released: November 22, 2019; Label: Se Lavi, Def Jam; Format: Digital download, streaming	—	—	—
In the Name of Gee	Released: September 25, 2020; Label: Se Lavi, Def Jam; Format: Digital download, streaming	40	22	19
Murder Made Me	Released: August 6, 2021; Label: Se Lavi, Def Jam; Format: Digital download, streaming	89	50	—
Two-Face Bang 2	Released: April 15, 2022; Label: Se Lavi, Def Jam; Format: Digital download, streaming	119	—	—
UNLV	Released: October 21, 2022; Label: Se Lavi, Def Jam; Format: Digital download, streaming	—	—	—
"—" denotes a recording that did not chart or was not released in that territory.				

== Singles ==
List of singles, with selected chart positions
Title	Year	Peak chart positions			Certifications	Album
Title	Year	US Bub.	US R&B/HH	US Main. R&B/HH	Certifications	Album
"Thuggin'"	2016	—	—	—		Non-album singles
"Body Bag" (featuring Blvd Quick)	2018	—	—	—		Non-album singles
"Oouuh" (solo or featuring Kevin Gates)	2018	—	—	—	RIAA: Gold	2 Face Bang and Big Ape
"Die Na"	2018	—	—	—		Non-album singles
"Slide" (with CMO Marcelo)	2018	—	—	—		Non-album singles
"Envy" (featuring Marley G)	2018	—	—	—		Non-album singles
"Free Melvin"	2019	—	—	—		Big Ape
"Mansion Party" (featuring Tee Grizzley)	2019	—	—	—		Non-album singles
"Story to Tell"	2019	—	—	—		Big Ape
"Fredo 2X" (with Big Fredo)	2019	—	—	—		Non-album singles
"OFF GRID" (with PH4DE)	2019	—	—	—		Non-album singles
"Gangsta Talk" (featuring NLE Choppa)	2019	—	—	—		Big Ape
"Why"	2019	—	—	—		Non-album singles
"Face Down"	2019	—	—	—		Pain Made Me Numb
"Slidin"	2019	—	—	—		Pain Made Me Numb
"Cap a Lot"	2019	—	—	—		Pain Made Me Numb
"Vest Up"	2020	—	—	—		Most Hated
"Yo Slime"	2020	—	—	—		Most Hated
"Trust Issues" (solo or featuring NLE Choppa)	2020	—	—	—	RIAA: Gold	Most Hated
"Saucy"	2020	—	—	—		Most Hated
"Top" (solo or featuring Lil Durk)	2020	1	34	21	RIAA: Platinum	In the Name of Gee
"Receipts"	2020	—	—	—		In the Name of Gee
"Steppin" (with Pakman Jitt)	2020	—	—	—		Non-album singles
"Monsters"	2020	—	—	—		In the Name of Gee
"Clock Out"	2020	—	—	—		In the Name of Gee
"No Security" (featuring Kevin Gates)	2020	—	—	—		In the Name of Gee
"Second Line"	2020	—	—	—		In the Name of Gee
"21" (with Lary Over)	2020	—	—	—		Non-album singles
"Big Steppa" (featuring Sada Baby)	2020	—	—	—		In The Name Of Gee (Still Most Hated)
"Loose Screws"	2020	—	—	—		In The Name Of Gee (Still Most Hated)
"Gwym (Go Wit Yo Move)" (with DaLovely)	2021	—	—	—		Non-album singles
"Click Up"	2021	—	—	—		Murder Made Me
"H2O" (with DJ Chose)	2021	—	—	—		MULTI
"SeeSaw(Remix)" (with 407 Duke)	2021	—	—	—		Non-album singles
"Oppanese"	2021	—	—	—		Murder Made Me
"Slow Roll It"	2021	—	—	—		Non-album singles
"Bless His Soul" (featuring Polo G)	2021	—	—	—		Murder Made Me
"War Time"	2021	—	—	—		Murder Made Me
"Jail Blues"	2021	—	—	—		Non-album singles
"Street Team"	2021	—	—	—		Murder Made Me
"Many Men" (featuring JayDaYoungan)	2021	—	—	—		Non-album singles
"Don't Miss"	2021	—	—	—		Non-album singles
"Get Back"	2021	—	—	—		Non-album singles
"Fool for Love"	2021	—	—	—		Two-Face Bang 2
"Throw It Back"	2022	—	—	—		Two-Face Bang 2
"She Luv Me" (with DJ Chose)	2022	—	—	—		Non-album singles
"4's Up"	2022	—	—	—		Two-Face Bang 2
"Federal Raid"	2022	—	—	—		Two-Face Bang 2
"No Love" (featuring Sleepy Hallow)	2022	—	—	—		Two-Face Bang 2
"Last One Left" (with Roddy Ricch)	2022	—	—	36		Two-Face Bang 2
"Brazy" (with YNW Melly)	2022	—	—	—		Two-Face Bang 2
"Keep Shining" (with Eazy)	2022	—	—	—		Non-album singles
"Dead Man"	2022	—	—	—		Non-album singles
"Astronaut Status" (with Trapland Pat)	2022	—	—	—		Trapnificent
"Addy"	2022	—	—	—		Non-album singles
"Murda Man" (with No More heroes & Foolio)	2022	—	—	—		Non-album singles
"Bee Crazy"	2022	—	—	—		UNLV
"Big Poppin" (with Lil PJ)	2022	—	—	—		Non-album singles
"Free Thug"	2022	—	—	—		UNLV
"2 Death"	2022	—	—	—		UNLV
"Fuck The World"	2022	—	—	—		UNLV
"Fearless" (with DJ B Real)	2022	—	—	—		Non-album singles
"Double Dutch"	2022	—	—	—		Non-album singles
"DIE" (with Hotboy Due)	2022	—	—	—		Smacker Turned Rapper
"Lullaby"	2023	—	—	—		Non-album singles
"Hop Out"	2023	—	—	—		Non-album singles
"Sloppy Na" (with Einer Bankz)	2023	—	—	—		Non-album singles
"On His Neck" (with Hotboy Due)	2023	—	—	—		Smacker Turned Rapper
"Smooth Criminal"	2023	—	—	—		Non-album singles
"On Dat"	2023	—	—	—		Non-album singles
"No Mo (Fuck Luv)"	2023	—	—	—		Non-album singles
"How To Love, Pt. 2" (with Badd Tattoo)	2023	—	—	—		Non-album singles
"Free Melly"	2023	—	—	—		Non-album singles
"Undivided Attention" (with Tray Haggerty)	2023	—	—	—		Non-album singles
"Bang Man"	2023	—	—	—		Non-album singles
"Sideways" (with NLE Choppa)	2023	—	—	—		Non-album singles
"—" denotes a recording that did not chart or was not released in that territory.
