= YNW =

YNW or ynw may refer to:

- YNW Melly (born Jamell Maurice Demons, 1999), an American rapper and singer
  - Trial of YNW Melly, involving other rappers in the YNW hip-hop collective
- YNW BSlime (born Brandon Curtis King, 2007), an American rapper and singer, and the younger brother of YNW Melly
- YNW, the National Rail code for Ynyswen railway station in Wales, UK
- Your News Wire, a former name of the fake news website The People's Voice
