= Catching Feelings =

Catching Feelings may refer to:

- Catching Feelings (film), a 2017 South African romantic drama film
- "Catching Feelings" (Drax Project song), a 2019 song
- "Catching Feelings", a 2012 song by Justin Bieber from Believe
- "Catching Feelings", a 2005 song by Faith Evans from The First Lady
- "Catching Feelings", a 2017 song by YNW Melly from Collect Call
