= We All Shine =

Mixtape by YNW Melly
- Released: January 18, 2019
- Genre: Hip-hop
- Length: 55:44
- Label: 300
- Producers: BoogzDaBeast; C-clipz Beatz; CorMill; Izzie on da Beat; EY3ZLOWBEATZ; JayO; LJOnDaTrack; SaiDon; Savion; SkipOnDaBeat; SMKEXCLSV; Yung Shad; TrillGotJuice; Z3N

YNW Melly chronology
| I Am You (2018) | We All Shine (2019) | Melly vs. Melvin (2019) |

Singles from We All Shine
- 1. "Butter Pecan (Bonus)" Released: June 9, 2018

We All Shine is the second mixtape by American rapper and singer YNW Melly, released on January 18, 2019, through 300 Entertainment. It features the song "Mixed Personalities", which became famous after the rapper obtained a feature from Kanye West.

== Commercial performance ==
In YNW Melly's home country of the United States, We All Shine debuted at number 27 on the US Billboard 200. In Canada, the mixtape peaked at number 27 on the Canadian Albums Chart. On April 9, 2020, the mixtape was certified gold by the Recording Industry Association of America for over 500,000 album-equivalent units.

== Track listing ==
Credits adapted from Genius.
All tracks written by Jamell Demons & Fredrick Givens II.

| No. | Title | Producer | Length |
|---|---|---|---|
| 1. | "City Girls" | EY3ZLOWBEATZ | 2:53 |
| 2. | "No Heart" | Z3N; SkipOnDaBeat | 3:41 |
| 3. | "Rolling Loud" | SaiDon | 3:24 |
| 4. | "Robbery" | JOnDaTrack | 4:01 |
| 5. | "Beat a N*gga Block" | EY3ZLOWBEATZ | 2:26 |
| 6. | "Hold Up (Wait 1 Min)" | CorMill | 3:51 |
| 7. | "No More" | C-clipzBeatz | 3:42 |
| 8. | "No Holidays" | TrillGotJuice | 4:25 |
| 9. | "Mixed Personalities" (featuring Kanye West) | BoogzDaBeast; C-ClipBeatz | 3:50 |
| 10. | "Why You Gotta Walk Like That?" | EY3ZLOWBEATZ | 2:16 |
| 11. | "F*ck PNC Bank" | JayO | 3:37 |
| 12. | "Ingredients" (featuring Fredo Bang) | SMKEXCLSV | 3:12 |
| 13. | "Curtains (Burtains)" | SMKEXCLSV | 3:12 |
| 14. | "Control Me" | EY3ZLOWBEATZ | 2:45 |
| 15. | "Alarm" | Savion; Yung Shad | 3:44 |
| 16. | "Butter Pecan" (bonus track) | Yung Shad; Izzie on da Beat | 3:42 |
| Total length: | | | 55:44 |

== Charts ==
=== Weekly charts ===
| Chart (2019) | Peak position |
|---|---|
| Canadian Albums (Billboard) | 56 |
| US Billboard 200 | 27 |
| US Top R&B/Hip-Hop Albums (Billboard) | 17 |

=== Year-end charts ===
| Chart (2019) | Position |
|---|---|
| US Billboard 200 | 178 |
| US Top R&B/Hip-Hop Albums (Billboard) | 17 |

== Certifications ==
| Region | Certification | Certified units/sales |
|---|---|---|
| United States (RIAA) | Gold | 500,000^{‡} |
^{‡} Sales+streaming figures based on certification alone.
