= Santana World =

Mixtape by Tay-K
- Released: July 29, 2017
- Recorded: 2016–2017
- Genres: Hip-hop; gangsta rap; trap
- Length: 16:00 (Standard); 21:10 (Deluxe)
- Labels: 88 Classic; RCA
- Producers: 4jay; Hella Sketchy; PuertoView; Rob Surreal; Russ808; S. Diesel; Team Jacob

Singles from Santana World
- 1. "The Race" Released: June 16, 2017; 2. "The Race (Remix)" Released: December 14, 2017

Professional ratings
Review scores
Source	Rating
AllMusic	4/5 stars

Santana World (stylized as #SantanaWorld) is the second mixtape by American rapper Tay-K. It was released after his arrest on July 29, 2017, through 88 Classic and RCA Records. It contains all three songs that were included on his previously released extended play, #LivingLikeLarry, which surfaced before his arrest, as well as five additional tracks. The mixtape consists of eight tracks and features guest appearances from Diego Money and BandManFari, and serves as a follow-up to his debut mixtape #3Tay-K47 (2017).

A deluxe edition of the mixtape, titled Santana World (+), was released on December 14, 2017, featuring two additional tracks, "The Race (Remix)" and "I <3 My Choppa (Remix)", with the former being released as a single. The deluxe edition features guest appearances from 21 Savage, Young Nudy and Maxo Kream. The album peaked at 128 on the US Billboard 200. The track "The Race" became a fan favorite and one of Tay-K's most popular songs, peaking at number 44 on the US Billboard Hot 100, and was certified Platinum by the Recording Industry Association of America (RIAA) in January 2018.

== Track listing ==
Santana World – Standard edition
No.	Title	Writer(s)	Producer(s)	Length
1.	"The Race"	Taymor McIntyre; Shawn Young, Jr.	S. Diesel	2:20
2.	"Murder She Wrote"	McIntyre; Robert Robinson	Rob Surreal	1:52
3.	"I <3 My Choppa"	McIntyre; Aaron West, Jr.	PuertoView	1:45
4.	"Lemonade"	McIntyre; Steven Small	Team Jacob	2:12
5.	"Gotta Blast" (featuring Diego Money and BandManFari)	McIntyre; Rodrick Dickerson, Jr.; Bailey Phillips; Jerry Jones	Luci4	2:11
6.	"Megaman"	McIntyre; Robert Russo	Russ808	2:13
7.	"Saran Pack"	McIntyre; Jacob Thureson	Hella Sketchy	1:10
8.	"Dat Way"	McIntyre; Small	Team Jacob	2:11
Total length:				16:00

Santana World (+) – Reissue deluxe edition
No.	Title	Writer(s)	Producer(s)	Length
9.	"The Race (Remix)" (featuring 21 Savage and Young Nudy)	McIntyre; Young, Jr.; Shéyaa Abraham-Joseph; Quantavious Thomas	S. Diesel	3:31
10.	"I <3 My Choppa (Remix)" (featuring Maxo Kream)	McIntyre; West, Jr.; Emekwanem Biosah, Jr.	PuertoView	1:45
Total length:				21:10

== Charts ==
Chart performance for Santana World
Chart (2017)	Peak position
US Billboard 200	128
