= Young Pappy =

American drill rapper (c. 1995 – 2015)

- Young Pappy in the "Killa" music video, 2014
- Born: Shaquon Jerome Thomas c. 1995 (Note: Sources conflict on Thomas's age at the time of his death on May 29, 2015. The Chicago Tribune, DNAinfo, and HipHopDX reported he was 20, while CBS Chicago and the Chicago Sun-Times reported he was 19.); Chicago, Illinois, U.S.
- Died: May 29, 2015 (aged 19 or 20); Advocate Illinois Masonic Medical Center, Chicago, Illinois, U.S.
- Cause of death: Gunshot Wound
- Occupation: Rapper
- Relatives: Ryan "BuDouble" Thomas II (brother) Tayvion "TaySav" Thomas (brother)
- Musical career
- Genre: Drill
- Instrument: Vocals
- Years active: 2007–2015

Shaquon Jerome Thomas (c. 1995 – May 29, 2015), known professionally as Young Pappy, was an American rapper from Chicago, Illinois, associated with the North Side iteration of drill. He drew attention primarily on YouTube for what Pitchfork called a "harsh, breathless delivery" and for videos that taunted rivals; the outlet later named his 2014 track "Killa" essential to the subgenre. The Chicago Reader listed his 2015 mixtape 2 Cups: Part 2 of Everything among the decade's best Chicago albums.

Raised in Rogers Park and Uptown, Thomas began releasing singles and videos in the early 2010s and developed a local following. He survived two 2014 shooting attempts that killed bystanders and was frequently discussed in reporting on the links among drill, neighborhood conflict and social media. In 2015 the Chicago Police Department monitored him through its "Strategic Subject List" (SSL), an early predictive-policing program that scored individuals by perceived likelihood of involvement in gun violence.

Thomas was shot and killed on May 29, 2015, in Chicago's Uptown neighborhood; contemporaneous reporting announced no arrests. Coverage of his killing and earlier targeting prompted police to increase patrols to discourage retaliation. In subsequent weeks, prosecutors charged a teenager in a separate Rogers Park shooting that they said stemmed from Facebook comments about Thomas; charges were upgraded to first-degree murder when the victim died. Scholars, journalists and officials later used his case in discussions of social-media taunts and offline violence, and North Side artists cited him as an influence. Chicago performers have included his name in tributes.

== Early life ==
Thomas was born in Chicago around 1995. He grew up on the city's North Side, primarily in Rogers Park and Uptown, and had an older brother, Ryan Thomas II, who raps as "BuDouble", and a younger brother, Tayvion Thomas, who raps as "TaySav". According to his mother, he performed well in grade school but struggled after falling in with a "bad crowd" while attending Sullivan High School. Police sources stated his first arrest occurred at age 13; by 2015 he had been arrested 23 times. Law-enforcement and court records identified him as a member of the Insane Cutthroat Gangsters (also known as "PBG"), a faction of the Gangster Disciples.

== Career ==
Performing as an unsigned rapper, Thomas released tracks and videos primarily via YouTube, building a local following with a string of singles and visuals. By October 2015, coverage noted that "Killa" had accumulated nearly two million views and situated his output within the rise of drill and social-media antagonism. He promoted the mixtape 2 Cups: Part 2 of Everything in 2015 and at times stated on social media that music could keep him focused and support his family. His collaborators included North Side rapper Shawn "Lil Shawn" Randall, who appeared with him in the "Shooters" video.

=== 2013–2014: Convictions and bystander killings ===
By 2015, Thomas had accumulated eleven misdemeanor cases and one felony conviction. In 2013 he was convicted of felony aggravated unlawful use of a weapon and sentenced to one year in prison after violating probation. He also served jail time for multiple misdemeanor convictions in 2014, including retail theft and reckless conduct. On February 5, 2014, a masked gunman opened fire in a McDonald's parking lot in Rogers Park; police stated Thomas was the intended target. He was wounded in the arm; 17-year-old Markeyo Carr, who was with him, was killed, and three others were injured. On July 12, 2014, gunmen again targeted Thomas on West Devon Avenue; he escaped, but a bullet struck 28-year-old photographer Wil Lewis, who died at a bus stop.

=== 2015: Police monitoring and final months ===
On January 14, 2015, Thomas fought with a man at the same McDonald's; that man was later shot in the leg across the street. Police arrested Thomas at his mother's home and charged him with reckless conduct and felony marijuana possession; his mother said officers "stormed" the apartment but found no gun. The marijuana charge was dropped. Thomas pleaded guilty to reckless conduct and was released in February after 29 days in jail (time served). On May 8, 2015, Thomas held a release party for 2 Cups: Part 2 of Everything at his father's residence. Reports of gunfire led to a five-hour SWAT standoff after partygoers barricaded themselves inside; Thomas and 30 others surrendered and were charged with misdemeanor disorderly conduct. During this period, CPD placed him on its Strategic Subject List (SSL), a predictive-policing algorithm intended to score individuals by perceived likelihood of involvement in gun violence. The New York Times reported that Thomas's score exceeded 500, placing him near the top of the list; a "custom notification" visit was scheduled but did not occur before his death. Local television coverage described the SSL as ranking roughly 1,500 individuals and guiding targeted outreach; it named Thomas as someone who had been on the list until he was killed in May 2015.

== Musical style and artistry ==
"Killa"
A 2014 track cited by Pitchfork as defining Chicago drill

Pitchfork characterized Young Pappy as "drill's underdog", noting his atypical North Side origins and describing his "demon-voiced" delivery as a development within the subgenre; the outlet identified "Killa" as his essential track and noted that Tay-K referenced him on "The Race". The Chicago Reader included 2 Cups: Part 2 of Everything among the best Chicago albums of the 2010s, arguing that he expanded drill's geography to the North Side and used "graphic accounts of aggression and passion" to build a consistent aesthetic. Commentators have cited his intensity and breathless flow as touchstones for later artists. Thomas's lyrics and explicit taunts were frequently cited as catalysts in neighborhood conflicts. Former Rogers Park Police Cmdr. Thomas Waldera described such videos as "technological kerosene" that could fuel violence, while members of Thomas's family countered that the "Young Pappy" persona functioned as a protective performance aligned with early gangsta rap marketing rather than a literal reflection of his identity. In prepared remarks about Chicago violence, the U.S. Attorney for the Northern District of Illinois used Thomas's case to illustrate how online taunts escalated offline shootings.

== Death ==
In the early morning of May 29, 2015 at 1:30 a.m, Thomas was walking on the 4800 block of North Kenmore Avenue in Uptown, when two gunman snuck up from behind and opened fire. Witnesses reported a thin man in a gray hoodie fleeing in a waiting black car. Thomas was struck twice in the back and was taken to Advocate Illinois Masonic Medical Center, where he was pronounced dead at 2:04 a.m.

== Legacy and cultural impact ==
In response to the killing, police increased patrols in the area to discourage retaliation.

=== Retaliatory violence ===
On June 1, 2015, 22-year-old Clifton Frye was shot multiple times in Rogers Park. Prosecutors charged 17-year-old Germel Dossie, alleging Frye had posted disparaging Facebook comments about Thomas; police identified Dossie as a member of the Insane Cutthroat Gangsters. Frye died on June 18, and charges were upgraded to first-degree murder. On September 13, 2015, Thomas's brother, Ryan "BuDouble" Thomas II, survived after being shot nine times near the site of his brother's killing.

=== Academic and media analysis ===
Thomas's career appears in reporting and scholarship on "cyberbanging"—the migration of street disputes to social media, where public taunts can create perceived obligations to retaliate offline. Author Matt Rosenberg described Thomas within a pattern in which YouTube "taunting violent-themed raps" exacerbated neighborhood conflict. The reference work Gangland: An Encyclopedia of Gang Life from Cradle to Grave cited "Killa" as emblematic of drill artists who glorify gangs and violence. In a 2015 speech, U.S. Attorney Zachary T. Fardon summarized the 2014 attempts on Thomas's life and his 2015 murder to argue that "trash talk" and taunting on social networks can be deadly. A 2018 interview tied Thomas's case to the argument of LikeWar—that viral attention can serve as a weapon in modern conflict on and offline. In 2024, professor and rapper Jabari M. Evans listed Thomas among notable drill artists killed during his fieldwork on Chicago's scene.

=== Posthumous recognition and influence ===
Later North Side artists have cited Thomas as an influence; in 2023, Uptown rapper Marko Stat$ named him a "major inspiration". In October 2024, Lil Durk included Thomas in a video tribute to deceased Chicago figures during a United Center concert.

== Discography ==
Year	Official Mixtape(s)
2014	2 Cups: Part 1
2015	2 Cups: Part 2 of Everything
2016	2 Cups: Part 3 (posthumous)
2021	2 Cups: Part 4 (posthumous)

=== Selected songs ===
- "Killa" — 2014 single highlighted by Pitchfork as essential to the Chicago drill canon; noted for Thomas's "harsh, breathless" delivery and enduring influence within the subgenre.
- "Shooters" (featuring Lil Shawn) — collaborative track whose video circulated locally; later coverage identified collaborator Shawn "Lil Shawn" Randall.
- "Homicide" — cited in contemporaneous profiles as part of Thomas's breakout run of aggressive singles and visuals associated with North Side drill.
- "Faneto Freestyle" — among the songs mentioned in local broadcast reporting as typical of his notoriety.

== See also ==
- List of murdered hip-hop musicians
