= Suicidal (song) =

2019 song by YNW Melly

Single by YNW Melly featuring Juice Wrld

from the album Melly vs. Melvin
- Released: March 13, 2020
- Genre: Emo rap; trap
- Length: 3:42
- Label: 300
- Songwriters: Jamell Demons; Juan Guerrieri-Maril; Jarad Higgins
- Producer: Z3N

YNW Melly singles chronology
"223's" (2019)	"Suicidal" (2020)	"Banana Split" (2020)

Juice Wrld singles chronology
"Godzilla" (2020)	"Suicidal" (remix) (2020)	"No Me Ame" (2020)

Music video
- "Suicidal" on YouTube
- "Suicidal" (remix) on YouTube

"Suicidal" is a song by American rapper YNW Melly from his debut studio album Melly vs. Melvin (2019). It is YNW Melly's second song to enter the top 20, peaking at number 20 on the Billboard Hot 100, and his second highest-charting single as well, following "Murder on My Mind". A remix featuring Juice Wrld was released on March 13, 2020.

== Background ==
The song was originally released in November 2019 as a track from YNW Melly's debut studio album Melly vs. Melvin. The remix of the song, featuring Juice Wrld, was first previewed by Melly on Instagram on December 8, 2019, the same day that Juice Wrld died. It was announced on March 11, 2020, and released two days later, following the song's virality on TikTok. It is Juice's third posthumous feature, following his guest appearances on "Godzilla" by Eminem and "PTSD" by G Herbo.

== Composition ==
The lyrics deal with the consequences of anguish, hatred and depression that resulted from a contemptuous breakup. Melly sings about drinking Hennessy to forget about the relationship, only to worsen his condition by abusing alcohol. Thus, the love is described as "suicidal".

== Charts ==
=== Weekly charts ===
Chart (2019–2021)	Peak position
Australia (ARIA)	50
Austria (Ö3 Austria Top 40)	75
Belgium (Ultratip Bubbling Under Flanders)	2
Canada (Canadian Hot 100)	29
Czech Republic Singles Digital (ČNS IFPI)	97
Iceland (Tónlistinn)	20
Ireland (IRMA)	27
Lithuania (AGATA)	38
Netherlands (Single Top 100)	68
New Zealand Hot Singles (RMNZ)	8
Norway (VG-lista)	29
Portugal (AFP)	55
Sweden (Sverigetopplistan)	71
Switzerland (Schweizer Hitparade)	75
UK Singles (OCC)	37
US Billboard Hot 100	20
US Hot R&B/Hip-Hop Songs (Billboard)	11
US Rolling Stone Top 100	7

=== Year-end charts ===
Chart (2020)	Position
Canada (Canadian Hot 100)	56
US Billboard Hot 100	75
US Hot R&B/Hip-Hop Songs (Billboard)	33

== Certifications ==
Region	Certification	Certified units/sales
Australia (ARIA)	Gold	35,000^{‡}
Denmark (IFPI Danmark)	Platinum	90,000^{‡}
France (SNEP)	Gold	100,000^{‡}
Germany (BVMI)	Gold	200,000^{‡}
Italy (FIMI)	Gold	50,000^{‡}
New Zealand (RMNZ)	2× Platinum	60,000^{‡}
Poland (ZPAV)	Gold	25,000^{‡}
Portugal (AFP)	Gold	5,000^{‡}
Spain (Promusicae)	Gold	30,000^{‡}
United Kingdom (BPI)	Platinum	600,000^{‡}
United States (RIAA)	4× Platinum	4,000,000^{‡}
^{‡} Sales+streaming figures based on certification alone.
