= The Race (Tay-K song) =

- Official remix cover

Single by Tay-K

from the album Santana World
- Released: June 16, 2017
- Recorded: May 2017
- Genre: Gangsta rap; trap
- Length: 2:20
- Label: 88 Classic; RCA
- Songwriters: Taymor McIntyre; Shawn Young, Jr.
- Producer: S. Diesel

Tay-K singles chronology
"The Race" (2017)	"After You" (2018)

Music video
- "The Race" on YouTube

"The Race" is the debut single by American rapper Tay-K. It was originally released on SoundCloud independently on June 16, 2017. It was re-released for digital download and streaming by 88 Classic and RCA Records on July 29, 2017. The song charted at number 44 on the US Billboard Hot 100, and is from his debut album Santana World.

== Background ==
Tay-K, whose real name is Taymor Travon McIntyre, recorded and released "The Race" while a fugitive from the U.S. Marshals Service. This was due to his escape from house arrest while on trial for capital murder charges in Texas. Tay-K makes references to this during the song, with the chorus being: "Fuck a beat, I was tryna beat a case. But I ain't beat that case, bitch I did the race." The charges, for which McIntyre was later convicted, stemmed from a home invasion in which 21-year-old Ethan Walker was killed.

The song was later used as evidence during the sentencing phase of Tay-K's trial as it appeared that he had been boasting about being on the run from authorities. During the chorus of the song, Tay-K says:

Pop a nigga, then I go out my way
Do the dash, then I go out the way
Rob a nigga shoes, rob a nigga lace
We tryna see a hunnid bands in our face

McIntyre released several songs while on the run from the police, including "The Race", which was recorded during McIntyre's stay in New Jersey. The music video was released on YouTube two hours after his capture. "The Race" debuted at number 70 on the US Billboard Hot 100 after a large hashtag campaign pursuing the release of McIntyre using the hashtag "#FREETAYK". "The Race" peaked at 44 on the Billboard Hot 100.

== Remixes ==
"The Race" has been remixed by numerous artists, including YBN Nahmir, Lil Wayne, Lil Yachty, Fetty Wap, Tyga, Moneybagg Yo, Montana of 300, Isaiah Rashad, Rico Nasty, and Key Glock among others. The official remix features guest vocals from 21 Savage and Young Nudy.

== Music video ==
McIntyre premiered the official music video for "The Race" on July 1, 2017, on the ALL BUT 6 YouTube channel. The song quickly went viral with Shawn Cotton, the owner of a popular rap news page, Say Cheese TV, confirming that it was shot while Tay-K was on the run and became a smash hit. "It's real. Look at the story. It's so authentic. It's real, and he has the story to back up. Rappers talk shit all day about what they do, but everything he's saying, happened. It's like Tay-K was telling us a story. It's like we're little kids about to go to bed, and Tay-K's telling us a story about himself, and he's visualizing it in the video. And it happened. It's all on the news."

The music video currently has over 200 million views on YouTube. The video was used as evidence at Tay K's trial for robbery and murder in July 2019. He was sentenced to 55 years in prison.

== Charts ==
=== Weekly charts ===
Chart (2017–2018)	Peak position
Canada Hot 100 (Billboard)	69
US Billboard Hot 100	44
US Hot R&B/Hip-Hop Songs (Billboard)	17

=== Year-end charts ===
Chart (2017)	Position
US Hot R&B/Hip-Hop Songs (Billboard)	64
US Streaming Songs (Billboard)	66

== Certifications ==
Region	Certification	Certified units/sales
Canada (Music Canada)	Gold	40,000^{‡}
Poland (ZPAV)	Gold	25,000^{‡}
United States (RIAA)	Platinum	1,000,000^{‡}
^{‡} Sales+streaming figures based on certification alone.
