= No Me Ame =

2020 song by Anuel AA

Single by Anuel AA, Rvssian, and Juice Wrld
- Language: Spanish; English
- English title: "Don't Love Me"
- Released: April 17, 2020
- Recorded: 2019
- Genre: Latin trap; emo rap
- Length: 3:50
- Label: Head Concussion; Sony Music Latin
- Songwriters: Emmanuel Gazmey; Jarad Higgins; Tarik Johnston
- Producer: Rvssian

Anuel AA singles chronology
"Sola y Vacía" (2020)	"No Me Ame" (2020)	"Illuminati" (2020)

Juice Wrld singles chronology
"Suicidal (Remix)" (2020)	"No Me Ame" (2020)	"Righteous" (2020)

"No Me Ame" (transl. "Don't Love Me") is a song by Puerto Rican rapper Anuel AA, Jamaican record producer Rvssian, and American rapper Juice Wrld, the latter appearing posthumously in this song. The song was released under Head Concussion Records and Sony Music Latin on April 17, 2020. A music video directed by Arrad Rahgoshay was released alongside the single.

"No Me Ame" debuted and peaked at number 15 on the Billboard Hot Latin Songs chart.

== Background ==
"No Me Ame" was recorded months before Juice Wrld's death from a drug-related seizure on December 8, 2019. According to Rvssian, he and Anuel AA had recorded the track in Miami when he suggested that Juice Wrld would fit this song. Rvssian stated that Anuel was on board with the idea, going on to say that Anuel and Juice had "mutual respect" for each other and their music. Rvssian presented the song to Juice Wrld, and he immediately loved it and started recording for the song.

"No Me Ame" is the first collaboration between Anuel and Juice Wrld. Rvssian had previously worked with Juice Wrld on the song "Ring Ring" from his 2019 studio album Death Race for Love.

== Music video ==
The music video, directed by Arrad Rahgoshay, was released alongside the single on April 17, 2020. The videoclip features all artists and was released as a tribute to Juice Wrld, who himself posthumously appears in the video as an angel through computer animation. Various references and images relating to Juice Wrld and his work were interspersed throughout the visual, including a scene at the end where Rvssian and other people release lit lanterns that form the number 999, a number that was used as Juice Wrld's symbol throughout his career and was also the name of his breakout EP.
