= Trapland Pat =

American rapper (born c.1999)

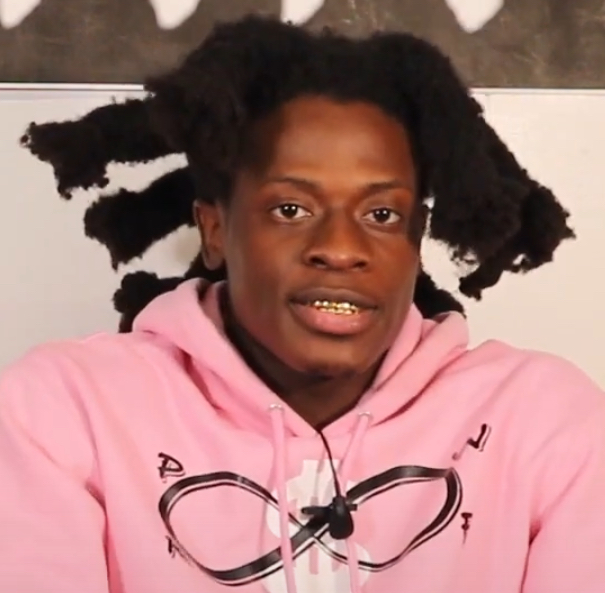
- Menard in 2021

Background information
- Born: Patterson Menard; October 29, 1999 (age 26); Deerfield Beach, Florida, U.S.
- Genres: Hip hop; trap
- Instrument: Vocals
- Labels: Alamo; Bang Biz; Create

Patterson Menard (born c. 1999), professionally known as Trapland Pat, is an American rapper.

== Early life and education ==
Patterson Menard was born c. 1999, in Deerfield Beach, Florida, a first generation born Haitian American. He grew up listening to other Florida rappers, and his older brother freestyle. He began rapping at age 13. He played football in high school, trying to play for the Miami Hurricanes. He received a scholarship for Indiana State University, where he played cornerback and wide receiver for the Sycamores, until his scholarship was revoked in 2018.

== Career ==
After leaving Indiana State, Menard moved back to Deerfield Beach to pursue rapping. After gaining notoriety from the song "Big Business", he signed to rapper Fredo Bang's, Bang Biz Entertainment.

In early 2022, Menard was signed to record executive Todd Moscowitz's Alamo Records. In June, he released his major-label debut mixtape Trapnificent, which contained features from Fredo Bang, Mozzy and Big30. Pitchfork rated the album a 7.0. Shortly after, he took a break from music to focus on his mental health. He came back in December with the song "Woo".

In June 2023, Menard released the mixtape Professor Trap, which contained features from Tee Grizzley, Luh Tyler, Fredo Bang, and Lil Toe. It also featured Rick Ross in a remix to his hit song "Big Business". In August, he and Luh Tyler were features on BLP Kosher's Bars Mitzvah.

== Personal life ==
On 8 July 2026, his older brother, Matt Menard, was murdered in a shooting.

== Discography ==
=== Mixtapes ===
List of mixtapes, with selected details
Title	Mixtape details
Exit 41	Released: July 30, 2019; Label: Bang Biz, Create; Format: Digital download, streaming
Pak Man	Released: October 30, 2019; Label: Bang Biz, Create; Format: Digital download, streaming
Interstate Baby	Released: May 16, 2020; Label: Bang Biz, Create; Format: Digital download, streaming
2020 Vision	Released: November 19, 2020; Label: Bang Biz, Create; Format: Digital download, streaming
Thru Da Door	Released: April 16, 2021; Label: Bang Biz, Create; Format: Digital download, streaming
Trapnificent	Released: June 9, 2022; Label: Bang Biz, Alamo; Format: Digital download, streaming
Professor Trap	Released: June 2, 2023; Label: Bang Biz, Alamo; Format: Digital download, streaming
Traplander	Released: October 19, 2024; Label: Bang Biz, Alamo; Format: Digital download, streaming

=== Extended plays ===
List of EPs, with selected details
Title	EP details
Pre Heat	Released: May 12, 2019; Label: Bang Biz, Create; Format: Digital download, streaming
