= Most Hated =

Studio album by Fredo Bang
- Released: April 17, 2020
- Length: 30:48
- Label: Se Lavi; Def Jam
- Producer: Moneybagg Yo (exec.); Bj Beatz; DJ Chose; DMacTooBangin; Hagan; Hardbody B-Eazy; KGrayWhatitDo; Mykel On The Beat; P-Crisco; ThisABeats; Yung Tago

Fredo Bang chronology
Pain Made Me Numb (2019)	Most Hated (2020)	In the Name of Gee (2020)

Singles from Most Hated
- 1. "Vest Up" Released: December 18, 2019; 2. "Yo Slime" Released: February 21, 2020; 3. "Waitin 4" Released: March 10, 2020; 4. "Trust Issues" Released: April 3, 2020; 5. "Saucy" Released: April 10, 2020

Most Hated is the debut studio album by American rapper Fredo Bang. After it had originally been scheduled for release on March 27, 2020, the album was released on April 17, 2020, via Se Lavi Productions and Def Jam Recordings. It features guest appearances from Lil Baby, Moneybagg Yo, Tee Grizzley, YNW Melly, and CeeFineAss.

The album debuted at number 110 on the US Billboard 200, marking his first appearance on the chart.

== Background and release ==
The album was originally scheduled to be released on March 27, 2020, but the date was pushed back to April 17, 2020, due to delays caused by the COVID-19 pandemic. Fredo was also unable to join Moneybagg Yo as a supporting act in his Time Served Tour, which was scheduled from March to May, after it was postponed indefinitely.

== Promotion ==
The first single from the album, "Vest Up," was released on December 18, 2019. It was accompanied by a music video on the same day.

The second single, "Yo Slime," was released on February 20, 2020. The music video was released the next day.

The third single, "Waitin 4," was released on March 10, 2020, along with a music video directed by ShotByDemarcusTV.

The fourth single, "Trust Issues," was released on April 3, 2020. It was accompanied by a music video on the same day.

The fifth single, "Saucy," was released on April 10, 2020, along with its music video.

The music video for "Traffic" was released on April 17, 2020, the same day as the album.

== Critical reception ==
Professional ratings
Review scores
Source	Rating
HipHopDX	3.3/5

Josh Svetz of HipHopDX rated the album 3.3/5, stating that "while it doesn't quite hit the mark, Fredo's willingness to experiment, coupled with refined production choices, shows he's not content with being just another face in the crowd."

== Commercial performance ==
Most Hated debuted at number 110 on the US Billboard 200. The album also helped Fredo reach the number one spot on the May 2020 edition of Rolling Stone's Breakthrough 25 Chart. It was streamed over 79 million times in the first six months after its release.

== Track listing ==
Most Hated track listing
No.	Title	Producer(s)	Length
1.	"Get Even" (featuring Lil Baby)	Hardbody B-Eazy; DJ Chose	3:16
2.	"Air It Out" (featuring YNW Melly)	Hardbody B-Eazy; DJ Chose	3:00
3.	"Saucy"	Hardbody B-Eazy; DJ Chose	2:19
4.	"Yo Slime"	Hardbody B-Eazy; DJ Chose	2:31
5.	"Bag Talk" (featuring Moneybagg Yo)	Hardbody B-Eazy; DJ Chose	2:51
6.	"Droppin" (featuring CeeFineAss)	DJ Chose; KGrayWhatitDo; Mykel On The Beat	2:37
7.	"Trust Issues"	Hardbody B-Eazy; DJ Chose	2:43
8.	"Traffic"	DJ Chose; P-Crisco	2:40
9.	"Let Me Tell You (Kianna)"	Bj Beatz; Hagan; Yung Tago	2:20
10.	"Vest Up"	Hardbody B-Eazy	2:17
11.	"Waitin 4"	DJ Chose; ThisABeats	1:47
12.	"Like A Gee" (featuring Tee Grizzley)	DMacTooBangin	2:22
Total length:			30:48

== Charts ==
Chart (2020)	Peak position
US Billboard 200	110
US Heatseekers Albums (Billboard)	1
