= YNW BSlime =

American rapper (born 2007)

- Born: Brandon King; April 10, 2007 (age 19); Gifford, Florida, U.S.
- Genres: Hip hop; trap; R&B
- Occupations: Rapper; singer; songwriter
- Relatives: YNW Melly (brother)
- Years active: 2018–present
- Labels: YNW4L; Sparta; 300

Brandon King (born April 10, 2007), better known by his stage name YNW BSlime (initialism for Young Nigga World BSlime) is an American rapper and singer. He is the younger brother of fellow rapper YNW Melly.

== Early life ==
Brandon King was born on April 10, 2007, in Gifford, Florida. He dropped out of high school following the success of his music career.

== Career ==
King first started making music in early-mid 2018, being featured on several songs with YNW Melly, YNW Sakchaser and YNW Juvy; he recalls freestyling during school lunch in 7th grade. During middle school vacation, his brother YNW Melly threatened to stop paying for King's V-Bucks in the game Fortnite if he did not come to a recording studio with him which pushed King to start recording.

In May 2019, during the 2019 Rolling Loud Miami festival, American rapper Yung Bans invited King to perform his brother YNW Melly's song "Murder on My Mind". In July 2019, King released his first single titled "Hot Sauce" produced by DJ Chose.

In November 2019, King released his album Baby Goat, with appearances from American rappers Lil Tjay and YNW Melly. In November 2020, he released his single "Nightmares" with American rapper Trippie Redd along with an accompanying music video.

In February 2021, King released his singles titled "Valenslime" and "OTW". In October 2021, he released his single "Citi Trends" with American rapper NLE Choppa.

In January 2022, King appeared on American singer and rapper Kidd G's single "Left Me", which is noted as a crossover between rap music and country music. He also collaborates with YBT Anubis (rapper on SoundCloud), and they recorded a song together. In 2022, King made another notable collaboration when he released "The Mob", which had appearances from YNW Melly, Trippie Redd, and YNW Bortlen.

In October 2022, King released his single "Free Melly" (with an appearance from American rapper DC the Don). He also released singles "Keep Trying" featuring BabyTron and Going Through Some Things.

In 2023, King released the singles "I Got A Bag" (featuring Hotboii), "Case Closed", and "Vulnerable".

In 2024, he appeared on four songs ("Top Off", "772 Love Pt. 3", "Save Me" and "Vile"), all on his brother YNW Melly's studio album "Young New Wave".

In September 2024, King released his second studio album, titled "Selfless".

== Musical style ==
In a mixed review by Alphonse Pierre of Pitchfork King's musical style on his debut album Baby Goat is described in the following manner: "As a singer, King's vocals were similar; you could tell he grew up on Young Thug like his brother. But instead of Melly's rough edge, BSlime's raps are brighter, like he sings hopped up on Honey Buns and dollar cans of Arizona iced tea." Steve Juon, writing for Rap Reviews also notes his style's similarity to Juice WRLD and Future. In an interview with RapTV, he calls Travis Scott, XXXTentacion, and older brother YNW Melly his biggest influences.

== Discography ==
=== Studio albums ===
Title	Details
Baby Goat	Released: November 15, 2019; Label: YNW; Format: Digital Download, Streaming

==== As lead artist ====
List of singles as lead artist, with selected chart positions and certifications, showing year released and album name
Title	Year	Peak chart positions	Certifications	Album
Title	Year	NZ Hot	Certifications	Album
"Baby Slime Freestyle"	2019	—		Non-album singles
"Stop Playing"	2019	—		Non-album singles
"Free Melly (YNW Melly Tribute)"	2019	—		Non-album singles
"Just Want You" (solo or featuring Lil Yachty)	2019	—		Baby Goat
"Homework"	2019	—		Baby Goat
"Freestyle LOL"	2020	—		Non-album singles
"Luv U"	2020	—		Non-album singles
"Just Wait"	2020	—		Non-album singles
"One Step" (featuring YNW Melly)	2020	—		Non-album singles
"Nightmares" (featuring Trippie Redd)	2020	—		Non-album singles
"Need You"	2020	—		Non-album singles
"OTW"	2021	—		Non-album singles
"Citi Trends" (featuring NLE Choppa)	2021	—		Non-album singles
"Call Back"	2021	—		Non-album singles
"Freestyle LOL 2"	2022	—		Non-album singles
"Valenslime"	2022	—		Non-album singles
"The Mob" (featuring YNW Melly, YNW Bortlen and Trippie Redd)	2022	—		Non-album singles
"No Kizzy" (featuring Deric)	2022	—		Non-album singles
"Pocket Watchin'"	2022	—		Non-album singles
"Don't Kill My Vibe"	2022	—		Non-album singles
"Free Melly" (featuring DC the Don)	2022	—		Non-album singles
"Keep Trying" (featuring BabyTron)	2022	—		Non-album singles
"Going Through Some Things"	2022	—		Non-album singles

==== As featured artist ====
List of singles as lead artist, with selected chart positions and certifications, showing year released and album name
Title	Year	Peak chart positions	Certifications	Album
Title	Year	US R&B/HH Main.	Certifications	Album
"Left Me" (Kidd G featuring YNW BSlime)	2022	—		Non-album single
"Change" (100k Track featuring YNW BSlime and Slatt Zy)	2022	—		Mercury
"Fair Enough" (Snow Banks featuring YNW BSlime)	2022	—		Non-album single
"How It Feels" (Hurricane Wisdom featuring YNW BSlime)	2022	—		State of Emergency
"Meatloaf" (Snow Banks featuring YNW BSlime)	2022	—		Non-album single
