= Melly vs. Melvin =

Studio album by YNW Melly
- Released: November 22, 2019
- Genres: Southern hip-hop; gangsta rap; trap
- Length: 46:38
- Labels: 300; Atlantic
- Producers: 9lokkNine; C-Clip Beatz; Chopsquad DJ; Dun Deal; Foreign Teck; JordanXL; Justin Clemons; Pitt Tha Kid; MariiBeatz; Murda Beatz; NEDO; Nils; SMKEXCLSV; QST; Rocco Did It Again!; Turn Me Up Josh; Wallis Lane; YNG Josh; Yung Shad; Z3N

YNW Melly chronology
We All Shine (2019)	Melly vs. Melvin (2019)	Just a Matter of Slime (2021)

Singles from Melly vs. Melvin
- 1. "223's" Released: August 9, 2019; 2. "Suicidal" Released: March 13, 2020

Melly vs. Melvin is the debut studio album by American rapper YNW Melly. It released on November 22, 2019, by 300 Entertainment and Atlantic Records. It includes the lead single "223's" featuring 9lokkNine, released on August 9, 2019. "Suicidal" received a remix, featuring late American rapper Juice Wrld, on March 13, 2020, making it the second single of the album.

== Background ==
In an interview with Uproxx, Melly said that the album would be released in April 2019. During a phone call from prison in October 2019, Melly announced he was releasing the album very soon.

On November 18, 2019, Melly's social media confirmed the release date and released the cover art. The album title is a reference to Melly's claim of having multiple personalities, two of which named Melly and Melvin. The album cover shows a juxtaposition of two faces of Melly, depicting his multiple personalities.

== Critical reception ==
Professional ratings
Review scores
Source	Rating
AllMusic	3/5 stars
HipHopDX	3/5 stars
Pitchfork	4.8/10

Melly vs. Melvin received mixed reviews from music critics. Fred Thomas from AllMusic stated that "It's unclear how much of Melly Vs. Melvin was written during the rapper's murder case," however, "the uncharacteristically bright pop instrumental and pleas for forgiveness of "Waitin' on You" sound like the last-ditch effort of a lost soul seeking salvation." Thomas concludes his review by stating that, "Melly plays things relatively safe on Melly Vs. Melvin." Josh Svetz from HipHopDX wrote that, "the inconsistent, but fun project featured a mix of bright harmonies slathered in grit and soulful love-sick ballads showing glimpses of his burgeoning talent," however, he also states that, "a few high points don’t save this release from a disposable existence." Concluding his review, Svetz adds, "As it stands though, the uninspired and indistinct assembly of rough ideas ends up being a major misfire in his discography."

Evan Rytlewski from Pitchfork rated the album a 4.8/10. He stated that, "It’s a powerful concept, evoking the dueling images that the media often uses to depict young black men and suggesting how easily their portrayals can be spun. It’s a shame the idea is wasted on an album as superficial as Melly vs. Melvin, which pads Melly’s precious few original ideas with second-rate material and third-rate Young Thug-isms." He continues his review by noting that, "Melly’s contrition isn’t especially convincing, however, nor is he effective at engendering sympathy." Rytlewski concluded his review by stating that, "Melly distinguished himself from his many SoundCloud variants with a ’90s R&B influence," however he states that, "assuming Melvin is the best music he had left in the vault, that doesn’t bode well for his prospects, either."

== Commercial performance ==
Melly vs. Melvin debuted at number eight on the US Billboard 200 on December 7, 2019, with 43,000 album-equivalent units. It is YNW Melly's highest-peaking album thus far.

== Track listing ==
No.	Title	Writer(s)	Producer(s)	Length
1.	"Two Face"	Jamell Demons; Darrell Jackson; David Cunningham; Jamarii Massey	Chopsquad DJ; Dun Deal; MariiBeatz	3:58
2.	"Suicidal"	Demons; Juan Guerrieri-Maril	Z3N	3:42
3.	"Adam Sandler"	Demons; Joshua Conerly; Justin Clemons	YNG Josh; Clemons	2:41
4.	"Bang Bang"	Demons; Jermaine Smith; Cornell Haynes, Jr.; Akon Thaim; Ashanti Douglas; Giorgio Tuinfort	C-Clip Beatz	4:20
5.	"Billboard"	Demons; Conerly; Samuel	YNG Josh; Turn Me Up Josh	2:45
6.	"I Ain't Lying"	Demons; Conerly	YNG Josh	3:15
7.	"I'm a Star"	Demons; Steven Kubie; Nicholas Steele; Franck Bondrille; Gerald Yusuf	QST	3:12
8.	"My Slime"	Demons; Eduardo Hernandez; Martin Pitt	SMKEXCLSV; Pitt Tha Kid	2:26
9.	"100K"	Demons; Tariq Sharrieff; Jordan Orvosh	BLSSD; JordanXL	2:53
10.	"Nobody's Around"	Demons; Shane Lindstrom; Nils Nohden; Nedim Melkic	Murda Beatz; Nils; NEDO	2:58
11.	"Killuminati" (featuring Foreign Teck)	Demons; Michael Hernandez; Nima Jahanbin; Paimon Jahanbin	Foreign Teck; Wallis Lane	2:39
12.	"Stay Up"	Demons; Smith	C-Clip Beatz	4:12
13.	"Waitin on You" (featuring Tonk wit tha Gift)	Demons; Antonio Francis; Rashad Simmons; Steve Porcaro; John Bettis	Yung Shad	4:41
14.	"223's" (featuring 9lokkNine)	Demons; Jacquavius Smith; Rocco Valdes	Rocco Did It Again!; 9lokkNine
Total length:				50:43

Sample credits

- "Bang Bang" contains a sample of "Body On Me" as performed by Nelly, written by Cornell Haynes, Jr., Akon, Ashanti and Giorgio Tuinfort.
- "Waitin on You" contains a sample of "Human Nature" as performed by Michael Jackson, written by Steve Porcaro and John Bettis.

== Charts ==
=== Weekly charts ===
Chart (2019–2020)	Peak position
Canadian Albums (Billboard)	17
Dutch Albums (Album Top 100)	81
Latvian Albums (LAIPA)	30
Norwegian Albums (VG-lista)	39
US Billboard 200	8
US Top R&B/Hip-Hop Albums (Billboard)	3

=== Year-end charts ===
Chart (2020)	Position
US Billboard 200	104
US Top R&B/Hip-Hop Albums (Billboard)	46

== Certifications ==
Region	Certification	Certified units/sales
New Zealand (RMNZ)	Gold	7,500^{‡}
United States (RIAA)	Gold	500,000^{‡}
^{‡} Sales+streaming figures based on certification alone.
