= 9lokkNine =

American rapper (born 2000)

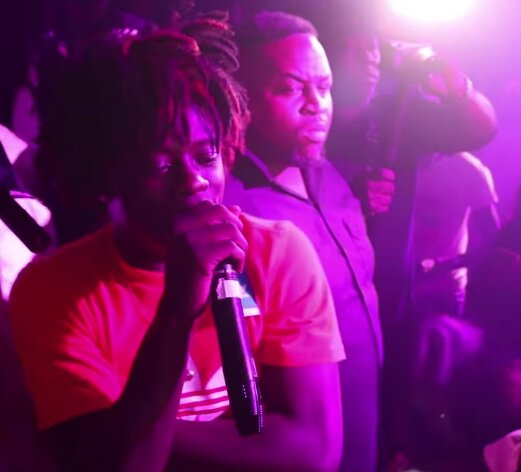
- 9lokkNine performing in 2018

Background information
- Also known as: GlokkNine; YJB Quay; Lil G9
- Born: Jacquavius Dennard Smith; May 1, 2000 (age 26); Orlando, Florida, U.S.
- Genres: Southern hip-hop; trap
- Occupation: Rapper
- Years active: 2018–2021
- Labels: Cash Money; Republic; AFNF
- Criminal information
- Status: Incarcerated since December 20, 2021
- Criminal charges: Possession of a handgun and ammunition as a convicted felon (x1); Aggravated identity theft (x1); Illegal short-barreled semi-automatic rifle possession (x1)
- Penalty: 7 years (87 months)

Details
- Date apprehended: July 14, 2021

Jacquavius Dennard Smith (born May 1, 2000), known professionally as 9lokkNine (pronounced "Glock nine"; formerly typeset as GlokkNine), is an American rapper. He is best known for his guest appearance on YNW Melly's 2019 single "223's", which peaked at number 34 on the Billboard Hot 100. Prior, he garnered a regional following with the release of his 2018 singles "10 Percent" and "Crayola", and signed with Birdman's Cash Money Records, an imprint of Republic Records in August of that year. His 2019 single and major label debut, "Beef" (featuring NLE Choppa and Murda Beatz), preceded the release of his debut commercial mixtape, Mind of Destruction (2019), both of which failed to chart.

== Early life ==
Jacquavius Smith, born on May 1, 2000, is described as being of Bahamian, Haitian and African-American descent. He grew up on Mercy Drive in West Orlando, Florida. During his youth, he had aspirations of becoming a footballer, a prospect which was halted due to his numerous legal encounters as a teenager. He lists his musical influences as T-Pain and Lil Wayne. His stage name was derived from friends giving him the nickname "Glock", referring the pistol's reliability to Smith's "grind and determination".

== Career ==
Smith released his first extended play, Kold Face Kold Case with nine tracks on January 2, 2018. He released his first mixtape, Bloodshells Revenge with 18 tracks on April 17, 2018. On May 8, 2018, Smith released a music video for his single "I Don't Need No Help". On July 23, 2018, he released his 17-track mixtape, Loyalty Kill Love. On August 3, 2018, he signed with Birdman's Cash Money Records, an imprint of Republic Records. According to a press release, the contract was worth US$2 million. On December 19, 2018, he released the 11-track mixtape, Lil Glokk That Stole Khristmas. In April 2019, Smith released his single "Party Pooper".

In August of that year, in the wake of YNW Melly's incarceration, 300 Entertainment released Smith's song "223's" as a single for the rapper, with Smith credited a guest feature. The song was initially included on Smith's mixtape Lil Glokk That Stole Khristmas mixtape, which released the previous December. Its commercial release became popularized on the video service TikTok, where numerous popular creators took to dancing to the song. As a result, "223's" peaked at number 34 on the Billboard Hot 100 and received double platinum certification by the Recording Industry Association of America (RIAA).

On October 25, 2019, Smith released his 16-track mixtape Mind of Destruction, which served as his first commercial release on Cash Money and Republic. On February 5, 2020, he released his single "Moods". Smith performed at the 2018 Rolling Loud Festival on May 13, 2018, in Miami, Florida.

== Legal issues ==
In September 2015, Smith, who was 15 years old at the time, was arrested in connection to a shooting that left a 17-year-old hospitalized. He was charged with aggravated battery with a firearm and unlawful discharge of a firearm and also had a violation of probation for trespassing. He was then taken to the Orange Regional Juvenile Detention Center.

On October 3, 2018, Smith was arrested on multiple charges, including possession of a concealed weapon by a convicted delinquent, grand theft in the third degree, and possession of less than 20 grams of marijuana.

On May 31, 2019, Smith was arrested in Orlando, Florida, and charged with multiple counts including possession of marijuana and illegal firearm possession.

On January 3, 2020, Smith was arrested in Miami, Florida, and charged with carrying a concealed weapon.

On October 8, 2020, he was arrested in Orlando on an outstanding warrant related to charges for possession of a firearm by a convicted felon and possession of a short-barreled rifle.

In January 2021, he was charged with multiple counts of attempted second-degree murder.

On June 21, 2021, he was arrested on charges including racketeering and conspiracy to commit racketeering.

On December 15, 2021, Smith was sentenced to seven years in federal prison after pleading guilty to identity theft and possession of unregistered firearms charges. He had fraudulently applied for and received benefits through the Paycheck Protection Act under another person's name.

== Discography ==
=== Mixtapes ===
List of mixtapes, with selected details
Title	Mixtape details
Bloodshells Revenge	Released: April 18, 2018; Label: 916% Entertainment; Format: CD, digital download, streaming
Loyalty Kill Love	Released: July 23, 2018; Label: AFNF; Format: CD, digital download, streaming
Mind of Destruction	Released: October 25, 2019; Label: AFNF, Cash Money, Republic; Format: CD, digital download, streaming
"—" denotes a recording that did not chart or was not released in that territory.

=== Extended plays ===
List of EPs, with selected details
Title	EP details
Kold Face Kold Kase	Released: January 2, 2018; Label: Self-released; Format: Digital download, streaming

=== Singles ===
==== As lead artist ====
List of singles as lead artist, showing year released and album name
Title	Year	Album
"Beef" (featuring NLE Choppa and Murda Beatz)	2019	Mind of Destruction

==== As a featured artist ====
Title	Year	Peak chart positions							Certifications	Album
Title	Year	US	US R&B/HH	AUS	CAN	NZ	SWE	UK	Certifications	Album
"223's" (YNW Melly featuring 9lokkNine)	2019	34	17	56	27	38	— (Note: "223's" did not enter the Swedish Singellista Chart, but peaked at number three on the Swedish Heatseeker Chart.)	75	RIAA: 2× Platinum; BPI: Silver	Melly vs. Melvin
"Tour" (Blueface featuring Asian Doll, NLE Choppa, 9lokkNine, Sada Baby and Kiddo Curry)	2020	—	—	—	—	—	—	—		Famous Cryp
