= Mixed Personalities =

Song by YNW Melly featuring Kanye West

from the album We All Shine
- Released: January 18, 2019
- Recorded: 2018
- Length: 3:50
- Label: 300
- Songwriter(s): Jamell Demons; Kanye West; Jermaine Smith; Jahmal Gwin
- Producer(s): C-Clip Beatz; BoogzDaBeast

Music video
- "Mixed Personalities" on YouTube

"Mixed Personalities" is a song by American rapper YNW Melly featuring fellow American rapper Kanye West, from the former's mixtape We All Shine. Written alongside producers C-Clip Beatz and BoogzDaBeast, it was released on the same day as the tape on January 18, 2019.

== Background ==
In mid-2018, Kanye West began collaborating with newer generation rappers, such as Lil Pump for "I Love It", XXXTentacion posthumously for "One Minute" and "The Storm", and 6ix9ine for "Mama" and "Kanga". West was introduced to YNW Melly's music through CyHi the Prynce and decided to fly him over to Los Angeles. YNW Melly previewed many songs from We All Shine to West, including "Mixed Personalities", after which West asked to feature on the track.

On December 5, 2018, YNW Melly shared videos onto Instagram of him meeting with West in a recording studio.

== Composition ==
Lyrically, the song describes a romantic partner who undergoes mood swings. West sings in auto-tune, which is reminiscent of the rapper's sound from his fourth studio album 808s & Heartbreak (2008). Dialogue of late former Marine drill instruct-turned-actor R. Lee Ermey saying "Because I am hard, you will not like me" is sampled from the 1987 war film Full Metal Jacket.

== Music video ==
A still from the video showing Melly and West's faces morphed together

The music video for "Mixed Personalities" was directed by Cole Bennett and released on January 18, 2019, the same day as the release of its parent mixtape, We All Shine. The video includes West and Melly hanging out with CGI robots with grass, trees and vines behind them.

== Personnel ==
Credits adapted from Tidal.

- C-Clip Beats – production
- BoogzDaBeast – additional production

== Charts ==
=== Weekly charts ===
Chart (2019)	Peak position
Canada (Canadian Hot 100)	51
UK Singles (OCC)	97
US Billboard Hot 100	42
US Hot R&B/Hip-Hop Songs (Billboard)	19

=== Year-end charts ===
Chart (2019)	Position
US Hot R&B/Hip-Hop Songs (Billboard)	49
US Rolling Stone Top 100	72

== Certifications ==
Region	Certification	Certified units/sales
New Zealand (RMNZ)	Platinum	30,000^{‡}
United Kingdom (BPI)	Silver	200,000^{‡}
United States (RIAA)	2× Platinum	2,000,000^{‡}
^{‡} Sales+streaming figures based on certification alone.
