= Just a Matter of Slime =

Studio album by YNW Melly
- Released: August 13, 2021
- Length: 43:26
- Labels: 300; Atlantic
- Producers: Yoda Yae1k; Ey3zLowBeatz; Go Grizzly; Mazouz Beats; Mega Beats; Official Smallman; Savion; Squat Beats; TrillGotJuice; William Van Zandt; Yarico Beats; Yung Shad

YNW Melly chronology
Melly vs. Melvin (2019)	Just a Matter of Slime (2021)	Young New Wave (2024)

Singles from Just a Matter of Slime
- 1. "Na Na Na Boo Boo" Released: September 3, 2018; 2. "Thugged Out" Released: March 5, 2021; 3. "Pieces" Released: July 2, 2021; 4. "Yung N**** Shit" Released: July 23, 2021; 5. "Best Friends 4L" Released: August 6, 2021

Just a Matter of Slime is the second studio album by American rapper YNW Melly. It was released on August 13, 2021, by 300 Entertainment and Atlantic Records. The album features guest appearances from Lil Uzi Vert, YNW Gunna, Hotboii, Kodak Black, Lil Baby, Lil Durk, Queen Naija, Young Thug, Lil Tjay, Kevin Gates, Future, and Tee Grizzley.

== Background ==
While in prison, Melly said that the album would be released in July 2021. At first the album was originally meant to be released on July 30, 2021, with ten tracks, however, it was pushed back to add more tracks; on August 6, it was announced that the album would be released on August 13, 2021 and that it would feature 12 tracks. Five out of the 12 tracks of the album were released as singles and four of them have music videos.

On August 6, 2021, Melly's social media confirmed the release date and released the cover art. The album title is a reference to Melly's incarceration; he references "Just a Matter of Slime" as being released soon. The album cover shows a snake looping around a Patek Philippe with some white VVS diamonds on them. Melly also confirmed on his Instagram from a video call from jail that he had been helping to produce this album from jail while awaiting his murder trial.

== Critical reception ==
Professional ratings
Review scores
Source	Rating
AllMusic	2/5 stars

AllMusic stated that "the project features old vocals from the pre-2019 vault -- and as a result, the album's features tend to take the main stage." He further notes that, "unfortunately, Melly's own vocals don't quite match the energy of his contemporaries", noting that "much of the album lacks the outlandish personality that made him so popular in the late 2010s." Concluding his review, Staff stated, "When combined with uninspired and sonically incohesive production, these tracks result in a lethargic layover tape, rather than a second full album."

== Commercial performance ==
Just a Matter of Slime debuted at number eleven on the US Billboard 200 on August 28, 2021, with 26,000 album-equivalent units. It is YNW Melly's second highest-peaking album following his November 2019 Melly vs. Melvin.

== Track listing ==
No.	Title	Writer(s)	Producer(s)	Length
1.	"Mind of Melvin" (featuring Lil Uzi Vert)	Jamell Demons; Symere Woods; Mega Beats	Mega Beats	3:50
2.	"Yung N**** Shit" (featuring YNW Gunna and Hotboii)	Demons; YNW Gunna; Javarri Walker; Will Jeffery	Will Jeffery	4:16
3.	"Thugged Out" (featuring Kodak Black)	Demons; Bill Kapri; Mazouz Beats	Mazouz Beats	3:05
4.	"Take Kare" (featuring Lil Baby and Lil Durk)	Demons; Dominique Jones; Durk Banks; YodaYae1K	YodaYae1K	4:28
5.	"Pieces" (featuring Queen Naija)	Demons; Queen Naija Bulls; Rashad Simmons; Yarico Beats	Yung Shad; Yarico Beats	4:05
6.	"Loving My Life"	Demons; Official Smallman; Yarico Beats; Simmons; Savion	Official Smallman; Yarico Beats; Yung Shad; Savion	3:52
7.	"Caprisun Fun" (featuring Young Thug)	Demons; Jeffery Williams; Kevin Price; Squat Beats	Go Grizzly; Squat Beats	2:44
8.	"Best Friends 4L" (featuring Lil Tjay)	Demons; Tione Merritt; TrillGotJuice	TrillGotJuice	2:40
9.	"Far Apart" (featuring Kevin Gates & Lil Tjay)	Demons; Kevin Gilyard; Tione Merritt; Ey3zLowBeatz	Ey3zLowBeatz	4:43
10.	"Greensight"	Demons; SMKExclsv	SMKExclsv	1:52
11.	"Freddy Krueger Remix" (featuring Future and Tee Grizzley)	Demons; Nayvadius Wilburn; Terry Wallace, Jr.; William Van Zandt	William Van Zandt	4:32
12.	"Na Na Na Boo Boo"	Demons; Simmons; Savion	Yung Shad; Savion	3:19
Total length:				43:26

Sample credits

- "Best Friends 4L" uses the same instrumental as "No Holidays" written and performed by YNW Melly.

== Personnel ==
- Chris Athens – mastering
- Christian "The Scientist" Perez – mixing
- Salvador Majail – audio engineer
- Chenet Charles – audio engineer

== Charts ==
Chart performance for Just a Matter of Slime
Chart (2021)	Peak position
Canadian Albums (Billboard)	44
US Billboard 200	11
US Top R&B/Hip-Hop Albums (Billboard)	5
