= I Am You (mixtape) =

2018 mixtape by YNW Melly

Mixtape by YNW Melly
- Released: August 3, 2018
- Genre: Hip-hop
- Length: 55:50
- Label: 300
- Producer: 17OnDaTrack; ForeignGotEm; Yung Shad; Yung Lan; EY3ZLOWBEATZ; Turbo; SMKEXCLSV; KiloKeys Beatz; ThaOnlySensei; Trauma Tone; Savion Beats; KhenaanT

YNW Melly chronology
Collect Call (2017)	I Am You (2018)	We All Shine (2019)

Singles from I Am You
- 1. "Virtual (Blue Balenciagas)" Released: April 5, 2018; 2. "Slang That Iron" Released: May 18, 2018; 3. "Murder on My Mind" Released: June 1, 2018; 4. "4 Real" Released: June 17, 2018; 5. "Mind on My Murder" Released: July 31, 2018

I Am You is the debut mixtape by American rapper and singer YNW Melly, released on August 3, 2018, through 300 Entertainment. It features the single "Murder on My Mind", which gained notoriety after the rapper turned himself in for double murder charges on February 13, 2019.

== Critical reception ==
Professional ratings
Review scores
Source	Rating
4orMyPeople	positive

I Am You received generally positive reviews. Robert Halliman of 4orMyPeople praised Melly's vocal abilities, stating "YNW Melly expertly displayed his brilliance on I Am You, as he gave his fans exactly what they were looking for while showing off his talents to a world of new listeners." Writing for AllMusic, Paul Simpson said, "His songs are raw and emotional ballads, showcasing his unfiltered vocals as well as his brash rapping."

== Commercial performance ==
In YNW Melly's home country of the United States, I Am You debuted at number 192 on the US Billboard 200. After the rapper turned himself in for double murder charges on February 13, 2019, the album peaked at number 20 on the chart. In Canada, the mixtape peaked at number 18 on the Canadian Albums Chart. On December 12, 2019, the mixtape was certified Gold by the Recording Industry Association of America for over 500,000 album-equivalent units.

== Track listing ==
Credits adapted from Genius.
All tracks written by Jamell Demons.

No.	Title	Producer	Length
1.	"I Am You"	Yung Lan; Trauma Tone	3:14
2.	"Virtual (Blue Balenciagas)"	EY3ZLOWBEATZ	3:14
3.	"Risk Taker"	Yung Lan; KiloKeys Beatz; ForeignGotEm	5:53
4.	"Freaky Girl"	Yung Lan; KiloKeys Beatz; ThaOnlySensei	3:34
5.	"YNW Home Invasion"	Yung Shad; Savion Beats; Khenaan.T	3:32
6.	"Mama Cry"	SMKEXCLSV	3:51
7.	"Wine 4 Me"	EY3ZLOWBEATZ	2:15
8.	"4 Real"	Yung Lan; Turbo	3:38
9.	"Drop Top"	Yung Shad	3:19
10.	"In the Mourning"	Yung Shad	3:19
11.	"Free Trell"	17OnDaTrack	4:16
12.	"Had a Dream"	HypeBeatz	4:21
13.	"Murder on My Mind"	SMKEXCLSV	4:26
14.	"Mind on My Murder"	SMKEXCLSV	4:36
15.	"Slang That Iron"	SMKEXCLSV	2:25
Total length:			55:50

== Charts ==
=== Weekly charts ===
Chart (2018–19)	Peak position
US Billboard 200	20
US Top R&B/Hip-Hop Albums (Billboard)	12

=== Year-end charts ===
Chart (2019)	Position
US Billboard 200	85
US Top R&B/Hip-Hop Albums (Billboard)	62

== Certifications ==
Region	Certification	Certified units/sales
New Zealand (RMNZ)	Gold	7,500^{‡}
United States (RIAA)	Gold	500,000^{‡}
^{‡} Sales+streaming figures based on certification alone.
