= 223's =

Single by YNW Melly featuring 9lokkNine

from the album Melly vs. Melvin
- Released: August 9, 2019
- Recorded: 2018
- Genre: Gangsta rap
- Length: 2:56
- Label: 300
- Songwriters: Jamell Demons; Jacquavius Smith; Rocco Valdes
- Producers: Rocco Did It Again!; 9lokkNine

YNW Melly singles chronology
"100 Shells" (2019)	"223's" (2019)	"Suicidal" (2020)

9lokkNine singles chronology
"Beef" (2019)	"223's" (2019)	"Moods" (2020)

Music video
- "223's" on YouTube

"223's" is a song by American rapper YNW Melly featuring fellow American rapper 9lokkNine, released as the lead single from the former's debut studio album Melly vs. Melvin on August 9, 2019. Written by the artists alongside Rocco Did It Again!, who produced it with the latter, it reached the top 40 of the US Billboard Hot 100, as well as in New Zealand, Canada, and Latvia.

== Background ==
The track, originally by 9lokknine and released on his December 2018 mixtape Lil Glokk That Stole Khristmas, was "rebranded" as a collaboration with YNW Melly, who has been in jail since February 2019 after turning himself in on double murder charges and possession of marijuana. It was released as a single in August 2019 after going viral on the video app TikTok.

== Lyrics ==
The lyric refers to gang violence, with the title referring to semi-automatic rifles that fire .223 cartridges.

== Music video ==
An official music video was released on YNW Melly's official YouTube channel on November 2, 2019.

The video featured the now-rapper Lil Mabu as a cameo.

== Charts ==
=== Weekly charts ===
Chart (2019)	Peak position
Australia (ARIA)	56
Canada (Canadian Hot 100)	27
Ireland (IRMA)	53
Latvia (LAIPA)	15
Lithuania (AGATA)	41
New Zealand (Recorded Music NZ)	38
Sweden (Sverigetopplistan)	94
UK Singles (Official Charts)	69
US Billboard Hot 100	34
US Hot R&B/Hip-Hop Songs (Billboard)	17
US Rolling Stone Top 100	16

=== Year-end charts ===
Chart (2019)	Position
US Hot R&B/Hip-Hop Songs (Billboard)	81
Chart (2020)	Position
US Hot R&B/Hip-Hop Songs (Billboard)	97

== Certifications ==
Region	Certification	Certified units/sales
New Zealand (RMNZ)	Platinum	30,000^{‡}
United Kingdom (BPI)	Silver	200,000^{‡}
United States (RIAA)	2× Platinum	2,000,000^{‡}
^{‡} Sales+streaming figures based on certification alone.
