= Tay-K =

American rapper and convicted murderer (born 2000)

- Also known as: Tay-K 47
- Born: Taymor Travon McIntyre; June 16, 2000 (age 26); Long Beach, California, U.S.
- Origin: Arlington, Texas, U.S.
- Genres: Southern hip hop; trap; gangsta rap; cloud rap; plugg
- Occupation: Rapper
- Years active: 2014–2017; 2025–present
- Labels: 88 Classic; RCA
- Formerly of: Daytona Boyz
- Criminal information
- Status: Incarcerated since June 30, 2017
- Convictions: Murder (×2); Aggravated robbery (×3)
- Penalty: 80 years imprisonment (Note: McIntyre was previously sentenced to 27.5 to 55 years in prison for the murder of Ethan Walker, but the sentences run concurrent.)

Details
- Killed: Mark Anthony Saldivar and Ethan Walker
- Date apprehended: June 30, 2017
- Imprisoned at: John B. Connally Unit, Karnes County, Texas, U.S.

Taymor Travon McIntyre (born June 16, 2000), better known by his stage name Tay-K, is an American convicted murderer and rapper. He is best known for his 2017 song "The Race", which peaked at number 44 on the US Billboard Hot 100 and received platinum certification by the Recording Industry Association of America (RIAA). Its lyrics detailed criminal activity carried out by McIntyre, and became popular following a nationwide manhunt that led to his arrest and eventual conviction for murder.

McIntyre spent parts of his childhood in California and Nevada before settling in the Dallas–Fort Worth metroplex in Texas at the age of ten. After dropping out of high school during his freshman year, he began his music career as a member of the rap group Daytona Boyz in 2014. In July 2016, he was charged in connection with a home invasion and robbery that left 21-year-old Ethan Walker dead. He was released in January 2017 on house arrest until his trial. In March of that year, Tay-K cut off his ankle monitor and went on the run.

McIntyre was captured by U.S. marshals in Elizabeth, New Jersey; on June 30, 2017, 14 days after the release of "The Race" and after three months evading authorities. Upon his detainment and subsequent transportation back to Texas, McIntyre received online support from fans of the song. While being held at Tarrant County Jail in Fort Worth, Tay-K's management team released his second mixtape, Santana World (2017), which was met with generally positive critical reception and entered the Billboard 200.

In July 2019, McIntyre was found guilty of murder for his involvement in the 2016 home invasion resulting in the death of Ethan Walker. He was sentenced to 55 years in prison. In November 2019, McIntyre was indicted on a second murder charge, for shooting 23-year-old Mark Anthony Saldivar while on the run in 2017; he was convicted in April 2025 and sentenced to 80 years in prison.

== Early life ==
McIntyre was born in Long Beach, California, on June 16, 2000, into an African American family. His father was imprisoned during McIntyre's youth. McIntyre's mother moved him and his sister to Las Vegas, Nevada, when he was eight years old. Two years later, when McIntyre's father was released from prison, he moved the family to Arlington, Texas, in search of a better environment. McIntyre attended Young Junior High School and Martin High School. He dropped out during his freshman year. He was influenced by Chief Keef, Eazy-E, Young Pappy, Lud Foe, and his favorite rapper Soulja Boy.

== Career ==
McIntyre started his rap career as part of the rap group Daytona Boyz alongside rappers Pimpyz and Santana Sage in 2014. The group released their first track "Drift" on audio distribution platform SoundCloud on December 25, 2014. The group released a series of songs, barely getting attention as they performed at various parties attempting to create a presence in the local rap scene.

McIntyre released his first solo song in August 2015 titled "Biff Xannen" on his SoundCloud account. This and his September 2015 song "Sly Cooper" garnered local attention within the Arlington rap scene. McIntyre's song "Megaman" was released on his SoundCloud on March 16, 2016, and, along with several other songs McIntyre released, became popular after he was arrested on capital murder charges.

McIntyre released several songs while on the run from the police, including "The Race" which was recorded during McIntyre's stay in New Jersey. The music video was released on YouTube the same day as his capture. The song debuted at number 70 on the US Billboard Hot 100 after a large hashtag campaign pursuing the release of McIntyre using the hashtag "#FreeTayK". It peaked at 44 on the Billboard Hot 100 and has over 255 million views on YouTube. "The Race" has been remixed by numerous artists including Tyga, Lil Yachty, YBN Nahmir, Fetty Wap, and Rico Nasty among others.

While incarcerated, McIntyre released the mixtape Santana World. WorldStarHipHop released "Coolin" on September 14, 2017. McIntyre's official Twitter account tweeted that the version released by WorldStarHipHop was a leak and not official, saying "we have something major in store." The track was later released on November 7, 2025, as a single, along with two other tracks "Half Off" and "Lay Low."

On December 14, 2017, McIntyre's debut mixtape Santana World was re-released by 88 Classic and RCA Records, which was updated with a remix of his single "The Race" featuring vocals from rappers 21 Savage and Young Nudy. "The Race" was certified platinum by the RIAA in January 2018. On February 2, 2018, McIntyre's official Twitter account tweeted two pictures of McIntyre, the first time he had been seen since May 2017. The following day, the song "After You" was released on McIntyre's SoundCloud account.

It was revealed in March 2018 that McIntyre had earned around $600,000 to $700,000 with his record deal with 88 Classic and RCA Records. Following the creation of the No Jumper music label, Tay-K was featured alongside BlocBoy JB on No Jumper's song "Hard" which entered the Bubbling Under Hot 100 charts at number 14. Tay-K was featured on the shortlist for the 2018 XXL Freshman list.

On November 23, 2019, McIntyre's Twitter account was maintained by a family member, against his manager, Ezra Averill's wishes. The relative tweeted numerous claims on the rapper's behalf, citing disaffection with his contract with 88 Classic and RCA, as well as his strained communication from Averill, promising to help McIntyre "make sure the truth about my life and my character gets out with or without management or a label". The tweets read:

I wanna apologize to all my fans and supporters for letting my management and label convince me that it wouldn't be a good decision to speak out against the way the media makes me look and the complete lies they spread... but I'm gonna make sure the truth about my life and my character gets out with or without management or a label. And whoever don't like it fuck you... the way the media inaccurately portrays me has affected my life directly. So instead of waiting on my "team" to get the bright idea to speak up on my behalf, things will be done differently... Of course I'm not perfect or nothing, but I'm most definitely not this monster that they try to portray me as. with that being said, I also apologize for the way I may have presented myself, I was young and inconsiderate.

Averill later retweeted the topic with an additional reply, "Change the narrative. It begins now #FreeTayK".

In November 2026, McIntyre released the prison-recorded album #MonstersUnderMyBed, which serves as his first official release since 2017.

== Legal issues ==
=== New Year's Day 2016: Bystander to a fatal shooting ===
McIntyre's legal problems began on January 1, 2016. After performing at a New Year’s Eve celebration event in Denton, Texas, McIntyre was in a car with U.S. Marine and fellow Daytona Boyz member Eric "Santana Sage" Johnson, who shot University of North Texas student Sara Mutschlechner in the head, killing her, following an argument between occupants of the car carrying Johnson and McIntyre, and occupants of another car carrying people leaving the same party, including Mutschlechner.

=== July 2016–2019: Mansfield burglary and capital murder ===
In July 2016, McIntyre and six other people were arrested on capital murder charges, related to a home invasion that resulted in the death of Ethan Walker in Mansfield, Texas. On July 26, 2016, Megan Holt, 19, and Ariana Bharrat, 20, conspired with McIntyre and other friends to rob 17-year-old Zachary Beloate. The pair planned to seduce him and then let McIntyre enter the house, armed with guns, to steal drugs and money. One of the two women unlocked the door and the gunmen proceeded to rob Beloate and his friend Ethan Walker, which led to a fatal confrontation and the death of Walker as they were attempting to leave. Two other non-fatal gunshot wounds were sustained. McIntyre admitted his role in the botched robbery in an approximate two-and-a-half-hour interrogation, telling detectives that he searched for drugs in the house.

McIntyre was transferred to an adult jail in July 2017. A preliminary certification hearing to decide McIntyre's status as a juvenile was held in August 2017. Trent Loftin, a lawyer for McIntyre, said to The New York Times that McIntyre was optimistic and that they were confident he would be cleared of all charges. It was decided that McIntyre would be tried as an adult in the case. The trial was eventually pushed back due to lack of evidence.

In February 2018, one of McIntyre's accomplices, an unnamed minor described as a "petite, pretty blonde" was sentenced to twenty years in prison after being found guilty on capital murder and aggravated robbery charges. In February 2018, accomplice Megan Holt pleaded guilty to aggravated robbery and agreed to testify against her co-defendants in exchange for a 20-year sentence. In May 2018, Latharian Merritt was sentenced to life in prison without parole after being convicted of capital murder. In August 2018, Ariana Bharrat pleaded guilty to aggravated robbery and was sentenced to 25 years in prison. In August 2018, Sean Robinson pleaded guilty to murder and was sentenced to 40 years in prison. In November 2018, McIntyre's last accomplice, Jalen Bell (Pimpyz), pleaded guilty to aggravated robbery charges and was sentenced to 30 years in prison.

McIntyre's defense attorneys argued that because McIntyre's case had started in the juvenile system — which does not have a bail or bond system in place — he was now entitled to one under Texas law (as of March 2018). State District Judge Wayne Salvant denied McIntyre's request for bond, expressing concern that McIntyre's alleged crimes had been "glorified" and that he was a "high, violent assessment".

In May 2018, it was confirmed McIntyre was not facing the death penalty or life imprisonment without the possibility of parole under Miller v. Alabama and Roper v. Simmons. If convicted, he faced 40 years to life in prison with the possibility of parole.

On July 15, 2019, on the first day of his trial, McIntyre pleaded guilty to two counts of aggravated robbery in the Mansfield home invasion case. On July 19, 2019, a jury found McIntyre guilty of murder and a third count of aggravated robbery. He faced up to 99 years in prison. His single, "The Race", which was written while he was on the run from the U.S. Marshals Service, was introduced as evidence during the sentencing phase of the trial.

On July 23, 2019, he was given 55 years for murder, 30 years for one count of aggravated robbery, and 26 years for the remaining two counts of aggravated robbery. The four prison terms will be served concurrently. He will be eligible for parole after serving twenty-eight years. He was fined $21,000, $10,000 for the murder charge and $11,000 combined for three counts of aggravated robbery.

==== January–June 2017: House arrest, manhunt and "The Race" ====
McIntyre was placed under house arrest in January 2017 while awaiting certification hearings. A few days before the hearings were held, on March 27, 2017, McIntyre and Bell cut off their ankle monitors and fled to San Antonio, Texas. Just before cutting his ankle monitor off and going on the run, McIntyre wrote the following on Twitter: "fuck dis house arrest shit fuck 12 they gn hav 2 catch me on hood". McIntyre made his way to Elizabeth, New Jersey, where he recorded the song "The Race", which described his run from the police and his legal troubles. The song's chorus is "Fuck a beat, I was tryna beat a case/but I ain't beat that case, bitch I did the race".

The suspect that McIntyre fled with was captured in May 2017. On June 30, 2017, McIntyre was captured by the U.S Marshal Service in Elizabeth, New Jersey. When McIntyre was captured, in order to avoid custody, he claimed to have swallowed a bottle of pills and was taken to a hospital. When nothing was found wrong with McIntyre, he claimed that he was hearing voices, and was then taken to a psychiatric ward for evaluation, where he was kept for a day and a half before being taken into custody.

=== April–May 2017: San Antonio shooting and Arlington mugging ===
While on the run after cutting off his ankle monitor, on April 23, 2017, McIntyre shot and killed twenty-three year-old Mark Anthony Saldivar while participating in a robbery outside of a Chick-fil-A in San Antonio, Texas. According to the allegations, McIntyre and Bell lured Saldivar into a black SUV to try to steal his photography equipment. Saldivar escaped the SUV and started to shout for help. McIntyre accelerated in an attempt to hit him. Saldivar jumped onto the hood of the SUV, kicking the windscreen until McIntyre allegedly exited the car and shot him once before driving away.

A month later, on May 25, McIntyre allegedly attacked and robbed sixty-five year-old Owney "Skip" Pepe in Cravens Park, Arlington, Texas. McIntyre allegedly held a gun to Pepe's head before knocking him unconscious in the park, where Pepe was later found by a jogger. Pepe later identified McIntyre during a photo lineup.

On October 3, 2017, additional capital murder charges were added to McIntyre's case involving the incident in San Antonio. Police claim that McIntyre was in the vehicle during the shooting and that there is surveillance footage of the incident. At the time, McIntyre was held on $500,000 bail. In February 2018, the bail was revoked.

In August 2019, less than two weeks after his sentencing for the Mansfield home invasion and murder, McIntyre was extradited to the Bexar County Jail to await trial for the Mark Saldivar murder case. In November 2019, a Bexar County grand jury indicted him for capital murder. In February 2024, Tay-K rejected his plea deal and decided to take the case to trial. The trial started on April 1, 2025. On April 11, 2025 closing statements were delivered, and the trial entered stage of jury deliberation. On April 14, 2025, McIntyre was found guilty of lesser offense of murder, instead of capital murder.

=== Other criminal activities ===
While in jail on August 2, 2018, McIntyre was charged with possession of a prohibited item after a mobile phone was found hidden in his sock during a search. McIntyre was moved from Tarrant County Jail to maximum-security Lon Evans Corrections Center on August 14, where he spent 23 hours in solitary confinement with one hour allotted to go to the gym. During his time in Tarrant County Jail, he allegedly shouted profanities and made death threats toward a Tarrant County Sheriff sergeant, threw his food tray and wet toilet paper, and went over his allotted phone time. McIntyre won a legal battle on August 16, when the Texas Second Court of Appeals ruled that State District Judge Wayne Salvant made a mistake in refusing to set bail for McIntyre concerning his aggravated robbery case. However, he was still denied bail for the case involving the murder of Ethan Walker.

On March 1, 2019, several online outlets reported that McIntyre was on the verge of forming a prison gang to affiliate with the Crips, called the Rug Ratz, named after the Nickelodeon animated series of the same name, to fuel a rivalry with the Texas-based Puro Tango Blast. A warden received a tip from an informant and as a result, McIntyre was placed in solitary confinement. The Fort Worth Star-Telegram was informed that a list of rules for the gang called the "Laws of Power" was being set up. They are not to inform police nor correctional officers "if caught in illegal activities, never to steal from a fellow Rug-Rat or disobey a higher rank and no hurting or slaughter of children, unless necessary." Members were to be "jumped in" or voted in by a sergeant and couldn't leave unless jumped out or two sergeants gave the member their blessing. Above all, "Love, respect, protect and cherish your fellow Rug-Rat always."

=== Industry responses ===
On May 10, 2018, Tay-K's management team claimed that his music was removed from playlists sponsored or curated by Spotify, alongside XXXTentacion and R. Kelly, as part of the platform's "Hate Content & Hateful Conduct" policy. A spokesperson for Spotify stated, "when we look at promotion, we look at issues around hateful conduct, where you have an artist or another creator who has done something off-platform that is so particularly out of line with our values, egregious, in a way that it becomes something that we don't want to associate ourselves with."

These decisions were met with criticism, citing the streaming platform's lack of confidence and cancellation of other controversial artists' content. On May 31, the CEO of Spotify, Daniel Ek, admitted that the policy was "handled wrongfully".

On June 1, Spotify received a threatening letter from Kendrick Lamar, who was once an artist of Top Dawg Entertainment, as well as its founder, Anthony "Top Dawg" Tiffith, wanting to remove the label and its artists' back catalogue from Spotify if the service did not reconsider its policy. Ultimately, Spotify reversed the decision to pursue the "anti-hate" conduct policy. XXXTentacion's music was recovered through Spotify's playlists and recommendations, but not Tay-K nor R. Kelly.

=== Lawsuits ===
McIntyre has been involved in three lawsuits as a result of his participation in the murders of Mark Saldivar, Ethan Walker, the attempted murder of Zachary Beloate and the robbery and assault of Skip Pepe. In June 2018, Saldivar's family, the victim of the San Antonio shooting, filed a wrongful death lawsuit seeking more than $1 million in damages. A month later, Walker's family and survivor Zachary Beloate jointly sued McIntyre and his former record labels, 88 Classic and RCA Records, for the profits of his music following Walker's death and Beloate's injuries.

On May 2, 2019, Skip Pepe and his wife filed a lawsuit against McIntyre, his former manager Ezra Averill, and the labels 88 Classic and RCA Records. "These Defendants chose to financially profit from McIntyre's violent crimes, and take money for themselves from the sale of his music that otherwise would be available to compensate McIntyre's victims", as read by Pepe's attorney in the lawsuit.

== Personal life ==
While in prison, McIntyre developed a hobby of reading; he began reading The Quran and also developed a fascination with manga. In his interview, McIntyre said he read Chainsaw Man, Fullmetal Alchemist, Hunter X Hunter, and The Promised Neverland, and that he still considers the latter his favorite manga.

== Discography ==
=== Studio albums ===
Title	Album details
#MonstersUnderMyBed	Released: November 13, 2026; Label: RR4L Worldwide, Create, broke; Format: LP, digital download, streaming

=== Mixtapes ===
List of mixtapes, with selected details and chart positions
Title	Details	Peak chart positions
Title	Details	US
#3Tay-K47	Released: July 4, 2017; Label: Self-released; Format: Digital download, streaming	—
Santana World	Released: July 17, 2017; Label: 88 Classic, RCA; Format: Digital download, streaming	128

=== Extended plays ===
Extended play with selected details
Title	EP details
#LivingLikeLarry	Released: May 4, 2017; Label: Self-released; Format: Digital download, streaming

=== Singles ===
==== As lead artist ====
List of singles as lead artist, with selected chart positions and certifications
Title	Year	Peak chart positions				Certifications	Album
Title	Year	US	US R&B/HH	US Rap	CAN	Certifications	Album
"The Race"	2017	44	17	12	69	RIAA: Platinum; MC: Gold	Santana World
"After You"	2018	—	—	—	—		Non-album singles
"Coolin"	2025	—	—	—	—		Non-album singles
"Half Off"	2025	—	—	—	—		Non-album singles
"Lay Low"	2025	—	—	—	—		Non-album singles
"Everywhere I Go"	2026	—	—	—	—		#MonstersUnderMyBed
"Erupt"	2026	—	—	—	—		#MonstersUnderMyBed
"Punch You Down"	2026	—	—	—	—		#MonstersUnderMyBed

==== As featured artist ====
List of singles as featured artist, with selected chart positions and certifications
Title	Year	Peak chart positions		Certifications	Album
Title	Year	US Bub.	US R&B/HH Bub.	Certifications	Album
"Hard" (No Jumper featuring Tay-K and BlocBoy JB)	2018	14	4	RIAA: Gold	Non-album single
