= Trial of YNW Melly =

Murder trial in Florida

State of Florida v. Jamell Demons
- Court: 17th Judicial Circuit in and for Broward County, Florida
- Full case name: State Florida v. Jamell Demons
- Submitted: February 13, 2019
- Started: June 12, 2023
- Decided: July 22, 2023 (First trial)
- Verdict: First trial: Hung jury
- Charge: The first-degree murder of Anthony Williams; The first-degree murder of Christopher Thomas Jr.; Witness tampering (second trial only)
- Prosecution: Alixandra Buckelew
- Defense: Stuart Adelstein, Jaime Benjamin

Court membership
- Judges sitting: John J. Murphy III, Brayden K. Poirier, Martin Fein

State of Florida v. Jamell Demons is an ongoing American criminal case in Florida's 17th Judicial Circuit in which rapper Jamell Demons, professionally known as YNW Melly, is accused of murdering his two friends, Anthony D'Andre Williams (YNW Sakchaser) and Christopher Jermaine Thomas Jr. (YNW Juvy) in October 2018. If convicted, he faces either life in prison without the possibility of parole or the death penalty.

If convicted, Demons could be one of the first defendants sentenced under Governor Ron DeSantis’ new non-unanimous death penalty law, which allows a jury to recommend death if at least eight out of twelve jurors agree. The case gained public attention because Demons’ hit single "Murder on My Mind" discusses hypothetical homicidal ideation. On July 22, 2023, Judge John Murphy declared a mistrial after the jury remained deadlocked on the charges, with a 9-to-3 vote favoring conviction on the lesser offenses of manslaughter.

As of May 2024, the retrial is on hold pending adjudication of a video from Demons' YouTube channel as evidence. Demons’ attorneys have requested to move forward with the discovery phase of the trial, but as of August 2025, the judge has not ruled due to ongoing appeals over evidence. The retrial is now postponed until January 6, 2027, meaning Demons will have spent over eight years in custody without a conviction. The trial continues to attract attention from both media and fans, in part because of the notoriety of Demons’ music, the length of time he has been incarcerated, and the potential implications of Florida’s new non-unanimous death penalty law.

== Arrests and charges ==
Following a grand jury indictment of Demons and Henry for the murders, Demons and Henry were arrested on February 13, 2019, and charged with the premeditated first-degree murders of Williams and Thomas. Demons pleaded not guilty.

== Trial ==
The Jury selection for the trial of Demons started on April 11, 2023. The trial began on June 12, 2023. Prosecutors sought the death penalty.

=== Opening statements ===
Both the prosecution and defense gave opening statements on June 12, 2023.

==== Prosecution ====
Former Prosecutor Kristine Bradley gave the state's opening statement. She stated that Melly and Henry murdered their two friends, Anthony Williams and Christopher Thomas, and attempted to stage it as a drive-by shooting. She claimed that Demons confessed to murdering Williams and Thomas when he stated on Instagram direct messages in response to a question about their deaths, "Shhhh. I did that."

==== Defense ====
Defense attorney David A. Howard stated that there was zero motive for Demons to murder his friends, and that the state's case is "riddled" with reasonable doubt. He went on to discuss his perspective of the murder investigation, "And, if after four years of investigation, the state comes and says, 'Hey, he killed two of his best friends.' And you're wondering why, and their answer is, 'Uh, I dunno.' That's the first indication that they're just guessing and don't know what they're talking about. And that, ladies and gentlemen, is, by itself, reasonable doubt."

=== Mistrial ===
The jury deliberated for fourteen hours over three days but were unable to reach a unanimous verdict, even after the judge gave them an Allen charge, a direction which urged them to try to come to unanimous conclusion. "Melly" remained in custody awaiting retrial in October. The new trial proceedings were set to begin on October 9, 2023. Jury selection began on October 17, 2023. In early 2024, the case was placed on an indefinite pause awaiting the inclusion of a video as evidence. On July 8, 2024, Judge Martin Fein, the new judge presiding over the case scheduled September 10, 2025, for the beginning of the upcoming re-trial. Judge Fein also set a pretrial meeting for December 5, 2024 regarding Demons' tampering case.

A juror in the case stated in an interview to Local 10 that the hung jury was a vote of 9-to-3 in favor of convicting Demons on two lesser offenses of manslaughter, an option that must be considered in capital murder cases per Beck v. Alabama (1980). The juror stated that it was initially a vote of 11-to-1, but accused another juror of being explosive and manipulative to other members of the jury, going as far as to shout homophobic slurs at a juror, eventually persuading two others to come to her side.
