= Murder on My Mind =

2018 single by YNW Melly

Single by YNW Melly

from the album I Am You
- Released: March 4, 2017 (SoundCloud); June 1, 2018 (Single)
- Recorded: 2016
- Genre: Trap; horrorcore; gangsta rap
- Length: 4:29
- Label: 300
- Songwriters: Jamell Demons; Eduardo Hernandez
- Producer: SMKEXCLSV

YNW Melly singles chronology
"Whodie" (2018)	"Murder on My Mind" (2018)	"For Real" (2018)

Music video
- "Murder on My Mind" on YouTube

"Murder on My Mind" (censored as "Mischief on My Mind") is the third single by American rapper YNW Melly from his debut mixtape I Am You. The song was originally uploaded onto SoundCloud on March 4, 2017, and later released as a single by 300 Entertainment on June 1, 2018. "Murder on My Mind" is considered YNW Melly's breakout hit, and garnered even further attention after the rapper turned himself in for double murder charges on February 13, 2019.

== Background ==
YNW Melly thought up the chorus of "Murder on My Mind" in early 2016 when he was first incarcerated at the age of 16. The song was released in March 2017, with him allegedly committing the double homicide in October 2018. Despite this, his prosecutors attempted to gain the ability to use the lyrics to the song, alongside 55 others, as evidence in his 2023 retrial. In 2019, YNW Melly's father remixed the song, in which he claimed his son to be innocent.

A music video for "Murder on My Mind", directed by Gabriel Hart, was released on August 3, 2018. In 2020, a TikTok trend emerged – in which an action was tied to the first beat of the song – which used the song.

== Composition ==
"Murder on My Mind" is 4 minutes and 29 seconds long. It was written by Melly and Eduardo Juarez Hernandez, known professionally as SMKEXCLSV. SMKEXCLSV produced the song, while J Lacy contributed as a mastering engineer and Michael Nguyen was the mixing and recording engineer. It is a trap song with piano-oriented production described as "mesmerizing". SMKEXCLSV created the beat for the song through FL Studio. He said in a Genius interview that he first established the melody of the song by using a stock piano plugin from the software which gave a "dark vibe". He then programmed the percussions, including the claps, snares, hi-hats, a kick, and an 808, before adding a stock vocal sample and finally a flute sample, which he likened to the orchestral song Lux Aeterna.

Lyrically, "Murder on My Mind" has been described as "haunting" and "deeply personal". It revolves around the first-person account by Melly of a protagonist who commits a homicide and struggles emotionally to deal with the consequences, "with the detachment of a narrator numb to chaos" according to Billboard writer Charles Holmes. The first part of the song sees Melly rap about his conditions and thoughts while incarcerated. He says that he was imprisoned over Christmas and was unable to visit his friends or mother, and that "When I'm all alone in my jail cell, I tend to get in my feelings." When asked if this line and other parts of the song were derived from his own experience in prison, he said: "Yes, certain parts".

The chorus of the song sees the protagonist say he won't let his detractors "knock me off my grind" before repeatedly proclaiming that "I got murder on my mind". The second verse describes an emotional scene where the protagonist accidentally kills his friend. In the verse, Melly says:

I didn't even mean to shoot 'em, he just caught me by surprise

I reloaded my pistol, cocked it back, and shot him twice

His body dropped down to the floor and he got teardrops in his eyes

He grabbed me by my hands and said he was afraid to die

I told 'em it's too late my friend, it's time to say "Goodbye"

And he died inside my arms, blood all on my shirt

== Commercial performance ==
After news broke of YNW Melly's murder charges on February 13, 2019, "Murder on My Mind" garnered major public interest. Days later, the song reached number one on the US Apple Music chart. On national charts, it peaked inside the top 20 in the US, the UK, and New Zealand, as well as reaching the top 10 in both Canada and Belgium.

As of 2022, "Murder on My Mind" is certified four-times platinum.

== Charts ==
=== Weekly charts ===
Weekly chart performance for "Murder on My Mind"
Chart (2019)	Peak position
Australia (ARIA)	57
Belgium (Ultratip Bubbling Under Flanders)	9
Canada (Canadian Hot 100)	9
Ireland (IRMA)	24
Netherlands (Single Top 100)	66
New Zealand (Recorded Music NZ)	18
Norway (VG-lista)	30
Portugal (AFP)	58
Sweden (Sverigetopplistan)	39
UK Singles (Official Charts)	20
US Billboard Hot 100	14
US Hot R&B/Hip-Hop Songs (Billboard)	7
US Rolling Stone Top 100	86

2023 weekly chart performance for "Murder on My Mind"
Chart (2023)	Peak position
Portugal (AFP)	53

=== Year-end charts ===
Year-end chart performance for "Murder on My Mind"
Chart (2019)	Position
Canada (Canadian Hot 100)	57
Portugal (AFP)	200
US Billboard Hot 100	66
US Hot R&B/Hip-Hop Songs (Billboard)	30
US Rolling Stone Top 100	25

== Certifications ==
Certifications for "Murder on My Mind"
Region	Certification	Certified units/sales
Australia (ARIA)	Platinum	70,000^{‡}
Denmark (IFPI Danmark)	Platinum	90,000^{‡}
France (SNEP)	Platinum	200,000^{‡}
Italy (FIMI)	Gold	50,000^{‡}
New Zealand (RMNZ)	2× Platinum	60,000^{‡}
Poland (ZPAV)	Gold	25,000^{‡}
Portugal (AFP)	Platinum	10,000^{‡}
United Kingdom (BPI)	Platinum	600,000^{‡}
United States (RIAA)	6× Platinum	6,000,000^{‡}
^{‡} Sales+streaming figures based on certification alone.
