= Fredo Bang =

American rapper (born 1999)

- Fredo Bang in 2026

Background information
- Also known as: Bang Man
- Born: Fredrick Dewon Thomas Givens II; March 29, 1996 (age 30); Baton Rouge, Louisiana, U.S.
- Genres: Southern hip-hop; gangsta rap; trap
- Occupations: Rapper; songwriter
- Works: Fredo Bang discography
- Years active: 2015–present
- Labels: Alamo; Se Lavi; Bang Biz; Def Jam (former)
- Producer(s): Hardbody B-Eazy
- Children: 1
- Website: fredobang.com

Fredrick Dewon Thomas Givens II (born March 29, 1996), known professionally as Fredo Bang, is an American rapper from Baton Rouge, Louisiana. He is best known for his 2020 single "Top" (remixed featuring Lil Durk), which received platinum certification by the Recording Industry Association of America (RIAA). His debut studio album, Most Hated (2020), was released by Se Lavi Productions and Def Jam Recordings, and executive produced by Moneybagg Yo.

== Early life ==
Givens was born on March 29, 1996 and raised on the south side of Baton Rouge, Louisiana. Givens grew up close to rappers Krazy Trey and Gee Money, both of whom were eventual victims of homicide in 2014 and 2017 respectively. Givens would serve two and a half years in the East Baton Rouge Parish Prison for a second degree attempted murder charge. In jail he made two of his most famous songs named “Oouuh” and “Father” which expressed how he was feeling while he was in jail. After being released he made a strategic plan to record as many songs as possible before letting people know he was released. This would give attraction and demand for his music, causing him to release his first solo mixtape “2 Face Bang” in October 2018. He would also remix his song “Oouuh” which would feature another fellow Baton Rouge rap legend, Kevin Gates, gaining over 92 million streams on Spotify.

== Career ==
Givens started his career in early 2015 when him, Blvd Mel, Gee Money, and YMM Captain released the song “iPhone 6,” which garnered regional attention in their Baton Rouge hometown.

Givens gained mainstream recognition after the release of his July 2018 single "Oouuh". His highest viewed videos are "Top", "Father", Oouuh" and "Trust Issues" which all have reached over 20 million views on YouTube.

In January 2020, he was featured on Moneybagg Yo's track "Spin on Em", which received a music video in May 2020. The record was produced by Fredo Bang's go-to producers and close affiliates, DJ Chose and Hardbody B-Eazy. In April 2020, he released his debut studio album Most Hated, which peaked at number 110 on the Billboard 200. On September 25, 2020, he released his fourth mixtape, In the Name of Gee, which peaked at number 40 on the Billboard 200.

== Personal life ==
Givens identifies as spiritual but not religious, although he believes in God. He has one biological child with Annisaa Buffins and raises Gee Money's children after Gee was murdered in late 2017.

=== Legal issues ===
In January 2016, Givens was arrested on charges of attempted second degree murder. He served two years in jail for the charge before being released in 2018. He got off parole in 2023.

On July 22, 2020, Givens was arrested again in Miami on a fugitive warrant out of Louisiana. He was arrested a day after his fellow Top Boy Gorilla artist Lit Yoshi, who was arrested on attempted murder charges.

== Discography ==
Studio albums

- Most Hated (2020)
- Yes, I'm Sad (2024)
