= YNW Melly =

American rapper (born 1999)

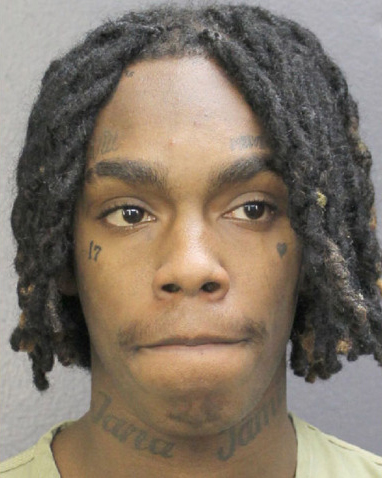
- YNW Melly's mugshot in February 2019

Background information
- Also known as: Melly, Melvin
- Born: Jamell Maurice Demons; May 1, 1999 (age 27)
- Origin: Gifford, Florida, U.S.
- Genres: Southern hip-hop; trap; R&B
- Occupations: Rapper; singer; songwriter
- Works: YNW Melly discography
- Years active: 2016–2019
- Labels: 300; Atlantic
- Relatives: YNW BSlime (brother)
- Website: ynw4life.com
- Criminal information
- Status: Incarcerated since February 13, 2019
- Criminal charge: Premeditated first-degree murder (×2)

Details
- Date apprehended: February 13, 2019
- Imprisoned at: Broward County Jail, Fort Lauderdale, Florida, U.S.

Jamell Maurice Demons (born May 1, 1999), known professionally by his stage name YNW Melly (initialism for Young Nigga World Melly), is an American rapper and singer. He rose to fame in 2018 following the release of his single "Murder on My Mind", a trap song that explores homicidal ideation. His commercial breakthrough, its release garnered him further attention after he was charged with the double-murder of two fellow rappers in the "YNW" collective the following year, resulting in an ongoing legal battle and incarceration. Prior to this, "Murder on My Mind" peaked at number 14 on the Billboard Hot 100 and led him to sign with 300 Entertainment. The label released his debut commercial mixtape I Am You (2018), which was met with positive critical reception along with its follow-up, We All Shine (2019).

Both mixtapes entered the Billboard 200 chart and received gold certifications by the Recording Industry Association of America (RIAA); We All Shine contained the double platinum-certified song "Mixed Personalities" (featuring Kanye West). His first two studio albums, Melly vs. Melvin (2019) and Just a Matter of Slime (2021), both maintained his commercial success, although critical responses were mixed. The former was supported by two Billboard Hot 100-top 40 singles—"223's" (featuring 9lokkNine) and "Suicidal" (remixed featuring Juice Wrld)—and peaked at number eight on the Billboard 200, while the latter peaked at number 11. His third studio album, Young New Wave (2024), was generally panned by critics, and failed to chart.

In February 2019, he was arrested and charged with two counts of premeditated murder for which he faces life without the possibility of parole or the death penalty if convicted. He is also a suspect in the 2017 murder of a sheriff's deputy in Gifford. In March 2019, Demons pleaded not guilty to the double-murder charges. His first trial ended in a hung jury. As of January 2024, his retrial was paused and awaited adjudication regarding the inclusion of digital evidence. The retrial has been rescheduled for January 2027.

== Early life ==
Jamell Demons was born on May 1, 1999, and grew up in Gifford, Florida. He was raised by his single mother, Jamie Demons-King, and does not know who his father is. Another rapper, Donte "Tha Gift" Taylor, claims to be Demons’ father. His mother was 14 years old when she became pregnant with him, giving birth to him in ninth grade. Later moving to a poorer part of Gifford, she struggled to pay for housing and basic necessities.

Demons joined the Bloods gang at a young age. He started posting his songs on SoundCloud when he was 15. In late 2015, Demons was arrested for shooting at 3 students near Vero Beach High School. He was subsequently convicted of aggravated battery, discharging a firearm in public, and two counts of aggravated assault, for which he served a year in juvenile detention.

Demons' younger brother, YNW BSlime (b. 2007), is also a rapper.

== Career ==
=== 2016–2018: Early fame, Collect Call EP, and I Am You ===
Demons adopted the stage name "YNW Melly" in 2016. YNW (an initialism of "Young Nigga World" or "Young New Wave") is a hip-hop collective that included Demons, Anthony "YNW Sakchaser" Williams, Christopher "YNW Juvy" Thomas Jr., and Cortlen "YNW Bortlen" Henry.

In late 2017, while still incarcerated, Demons released his first project, an EP called Collect Call, which contained features from numerous well-known artists, including Lil B and John Wicks. In 2018, he released the singles "Virtual (Blue Balenciagas)", "Melly the Menace", and "Slang That Iron". Other singles include "4 Real", "Butter Pecan", and "Medium Fries". The respective music videos have amassed 26 million, 16 million and 11 million views on YouTube, as of January 2019.

In 2018, he met and bonded with the Chicago rapper King Von, with whom he shared the same music manager, Jameson "100K" Francois.

In August 2018, Demons released his debut mixtape I Am You, which later appeared on the Billboard 200 at number 192 on January 10, 2019.

=== 2019–2021: We All Shine, Melly vs. Melvin, and Just a Matter of Slime ===
On January 18, 2019, while incarcerated, Demons released We All Shine, his second commercial mixtape, consisting of 16 tracks. The project featured collaborations with Kanye West and Fredo Bang. A music video directed by Cole Bennett with Lyrical Lemonade for "Mixed Personalities" featuring West was released with the album.

As of March 2019, Demons had amassed over 200 million streams on Spotify with over 10 million monthly listeners. His most-streamed song was "Murder on My Mind", which was originally released as a single before being added to I Am You.

On November 22, 2019, Demons released his debut studio album, Melly vs. Melvin. It peaked at number eight on the Billboard 200, making it his highest-charting album. The album included the singles "223's", which peaked at number 34 on the Billboard Hot 100.

On November 29, 2019, Demons was featured on "Rollin" single by his friend, etiquette colleague and Chicago artist King Von this is specifically the second single for Levon James mixtape, this song was also accompanied by a music video filmed by DrewFilmedIt.

On March 13, 2020, Demons released a remix of his track "Suicidal", making it the second single from Melly vs. Melvin. The remix included a feature from late American rapper and singer Juice Wrld, making it his third official posthumous feature. The song has peaked at number 20 on the Hot 100, becoming Demons' second top 20 entry.

After a year of not releasing music and still fighting his pending murder case, on March 5, 2021, Demons recruited fellow Florida artist Kodak Black for the release of "Thugged Out". This was followed up with other notable singles such as "Pieces" featuring Queen Naija and "Bestfriend 4L" featuring Lil Tjay. The singles leading up to Demons' sophomore studio album, Just a Matter of Slime, like Melly vs. Melvin were released while incarcerated and were put together with pre-recorded vocals prior to his incarceration.

=== Musical style ===
YNW Melly has been noted for his melodic vocals and his "mix of bright harmonies slathered in grit and soulful love-sick ballads".

== Legal issues ==
=== 2015: Aggravated assault ===
Demons was arrested on October 19, 2015, on three counts of aggravated assault with a deadly weapon and one count of discharging a firearm in public, after firing shots at three people near Vero Beach High School. Demons spent a year in jail before being released on probation.

=== 2017–2018: Probation violation and possession of marijuana and firearms ===
In 2017, Demons was arrested for violating probation and spent several months in jail before being released in March 2018.

Demons was arrested on June 30, 2018, in Fort Myers, Florida, for possession of marijuana, possession of weapon or ammunition by a convicted felon, and drug paraphernalia.

=== 2019–present: Double homicide and possession of marijuana ===
YNW Melly's January 2019 mugshot, which was widely circulated on the internet

Demons was again arrested on January 3, 2019, in Fort Myers for possession of marijuana.

On February 13, 2019, Demons was charged with two counts of premeditated murder in connection with the October 2018 shooting deaths in Fort Lauderdale, Florida, of two YNW associates described as his close friends, rappers YNW Sakchaser and YNW Juvy. Authorities purport that Demons conspired with fellow YNW rapper Cortlen Malik Henry (YNW Bortlen) to stage the double-murder of Anthony D'Andre Williams (YNW Sakchaser) and Christopher Thomas Jr. (YNW Juvy) and make it appear as if they were fatally injured in a drive-by shooting. Demons turned himself in on February 13, 2019. He announced on his Instagram:

"No I did not get locked up in Washington, but I am turning myself in today... a couple months ago I lost my two brothers by violence and now the system want to find justice.. unfortunately a lot of rumors and lies are being said but no worries god is with me and my brother @ynw.bortlen and we want y'all to remember it's a ynw Family I love you"

— @ynwmelly

On February 22, 2019, Complex reported that Demons and Henry were suspects in the fatal 2017 shooting of off-duty Indian River County Sheriff's Department deputy Garry Chambliss in Gifford.

On November 30, 2021, Demons' double murder trial was set for March 7, 2022. The trial was later delayed and reset for May 23, 2022. Delayed again, the trial was pushed back until June 6, 2022.

After the trial did not proceed, Demons' defense team decided to submit a speedy trial request on May 26, 2022. The trial would have to commence in the next 175 days.

On July 6, 2022, a decision was announced that Demons would no longer face capital punishment if convicted. However, on November 9, 2022, the decision was overruled by an appellate judge, once again making Demons eligible for capital punishment if sentenced. Following the eligibility, Demons' team attempted to get this thrown out with an appeal to the Supreme Court of Florida; however, this attempt was unsuccessful.

Jury selection for Demons' double murder case had begun on April 11, 2023. Melly's trial began on June 12, 2023.

According to the prosecutors, forensic and video evidence point to Demons as the killer. Surveillance footage showed him taking the seat inside the car from which experts determined the shots were fired. Demons alleged the victims died as a result of a drive-by, even though prosecution evidence showed the fatal shots that killed the pair had come from inside the car. Demons and Henry were accused of parking, exiting the car, then staging the killings by shooting back into the vehicle, after which Henry solely drove the victims to Memorial Hospital in Miramar, where they were pronounced deceased. The jury deliberated for fourteen hours over three days but were unable to reach a unanimous verdict, even after the judge gave them an Allen charge, a direction that urged them to try to come to unanimous conclusion. A mistrial was declared July 22, 2023, as the jury could not come to a unanimous decision. Demons remains in custody awaiting his retrial. On September 22, 2023, Broward Circuit Judge John Murphy declined to grant the rapper bond as he awaited a new trial set for October 2, 2023. In January 2024, the trial was put on hold indefinitely after a judge's ruling to suppress a promotional video about Melly's life from evidence prompted prosecutors to file an appeal.

The retrial has been rescheduled for January 2027.

== Personal life ==
On April 2, 2020, Demons (via management) told fans on Twitter that he tested positive for COVID-19. He was in the process of trying to get an early release from prison due to health concerns, as 6ix9ine was released from prison due to asthma and bronchitis. On April 14, his motion was denied.

Demons claims to suffer from split personality disorder, in which he has a second personality called Melvin. Demons claims Melvin is the violent side of his personality and Melly is the happy and loving side.

== Discography ==
- Melly vs. Melvin (2019)
- Just a Matter of Slime (2021)
- Young New Wave (2024)
