= Kenny Mason discography =

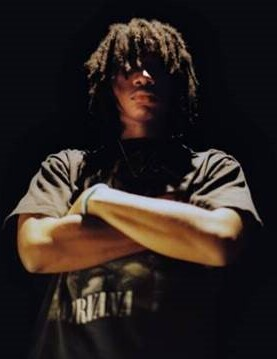
- Mason in 2021
- Studio albums: 3
- EPs: 12
- Singles: 15
- Music videos: 18
- Mixtapes: 4

American rapper Kenny Mason has released three studio albums, twelve extended plays (EP), two mixtapes and fifteen singles.

Kenny Mason's debut studio album, Angelic Hoodrat, was released on April 15, 2020. He released the deluxe edition of the album Angelic Hoodrat: Supercut on April 16, 2021. The deluxe edition features guest appearances from Freddie Gibbs, Denzel Curry, Ambar Lucid and Angel White.

On September 28, 2022, Kenny Mason released his debut mixtape, Ruffs. The mixtape contains guest appearances from Young Nudy, Jean Dawson, DavidTheTragic and Amindi.

== Albums ==
=== Studio albums ===
Title	Album details
Angelic Hoodrat	Released: April 15, 2020; Label: RCA; Format: Digital download, streaming
9	Released: March 14, 2024; Label: RCA; Format: Digital download, streaming
Bulldawg	Released: May 12, 2026; Label: Self-released; Format: Digital download, streaming

== Mixtapes ==
=== Mixtapes ===
Title	Album details
Ruffs	Released: September 28, 2022; Label: RCA; Format: Digital download, streaming
Angel Eyes	Released: November 20, 2024; Label: RCA; Format: Digital download, streaming

=== Collaborative mixtapes ===
Title	Album details
TvDinner (with Clark Scott)	Released: September 12, 2014; Label: Self-released; Format: Digital download, streaming
The SUPER Tape (with DvDx)	Released: April 28, 2016; Label: Self-released; Format: Digital download, streaming

== Extended plays ==
Title	Album details
KennyTurns20	Released: 2015; Label: Self-released; Format: Digital download, streaming
Free Mason	Released: July 21, 2015; Label: Self-released; Format: Digital download, streaming
Free Mason 2	Released: October 12, 2015; Label: Self-released; Format: Digital download, streaming
Avondale Angels	Released: 2016; Label: Self-released; Format: Digital download, streaming
Avondale Angels 2	Released: 2016; Label: Self-released; Format: Digital download, streaming
KennyTurns22	Released: December 17, 2016; Label: Self-released; Format: Digital download, streaming
November '19	Released: October 19, 2019; Label: Self-released; Format: Digital download, streaming
Pup Pack	Released: August 17, 2022; Label: RCA; Format: Digital download, streaming
pr3	Released: February 7, 2023; Label: RCA; Format: Digital download, streaming
3	Released: March 3, 2023; Label: RCA; Format: Digital download, streaming
6	Released: June 6, 2023; Label: RCA; Format: Digital download, streaming
Highway 9	Released: December 8, 2023; Label: RCA; Format: Digital download, streaming
Pup Pack: 1st Shift	Released: November 19, 2025; Label: RCA; Format: Digital download, streaming
Pup Pack: 2nd Shift	Released: December 17, 2025; Label: RCA; Format: Digital download, streaming
Pup Pack: 3rd Shift	Released: February 4, 2026; Label: RCA; Format: Digital download, streaming

== Singles ==
=== As lead artist ===
Title	Year	Album
"22"	2016	KennyTurns22
"4real"	2017	Non-album single
"Nike 2"	2018	Non-album single
"G.O.A.T"	2019	A3C, Vol.8
"Hit"	2019	Angelic Hoodrat
"Angelic Hoodrat"	2019	Angelic Hoodrat
"Metal Wings"	2020	Angelic Hoodrat
"A+" (featuring Denzel Curry)	2020	Ruffs
"Much Money"	2020	Ruffs
"Freak" (featuring Jayxin)	2020	Ruffs
"Partments"	2021	Angelic Hoodrat: Supercut
"Pup"	2021	Angelic Hoodrat: Supercut
"Play Ball"	2021	Angelic Hoodrat: Supercut
"Rih"	2021	Angelic Hoodrat: Supercut
"Dracula"	2023	6

== Guest appearances ==
List of notable guest appearances, with other performing artists, showing year released and album name
Title	Year	Artist(s)	Album
"Lucy Pearl"	2016	Salvatore Perigio, L-T Terror, TopNotch Swave	PowerUp Z
"Facade"	2016	Salvatore Perigio, L-T Terror, TopNotch Swave, Mr. Epic	PowerUp Z
"Whole Life"	2016	Salvatore Perigio, L-T Terror, TopNotch Swave, Mr. Epic, DvDx	PowerUp Z
"Internet"	2017	Jazz Ingram	Baby New Years
"Illiterate"	2018	Boregard.	The Rap Game Bo Jackson Vol. 1
"Talk Is Cheap"	2018	Boregard.	Free Action
"Deal"	2018	Boregard.	Free Action
"Moovin'"	2018	DavidTheTragic	NatureWorld
"Digit"	2018	Salvatore Perigio, DvDx	#MaybeThisWeek Trilogy
"Touch N Buss"	2018	Salvatore Perigio	#MaybeThisWeek Trilogy
"Montage (Put on a show)"	2019	TopNotch Swave	Mania
"Shells on the Rug"	2019	Wiley From Atlanta	Blue Don't Make Me Cry
"It Rains"	2019	Wiley From Atlanta	Non-album single
"Yums!"	2019	Jelani Imani	Non-album single
"Okay"	2020	Jelani Imani	The Shell (Deluxe)
"Goldmember"	2020	Jelani Imani	Floatin
"What U Seen"	2020	Popstar Benny, Jelani Imani, Jayxin, DavidTheTragic, Vonta	2020
"Cereal"	2020	IDK, JID	USee4Yourself (Deluxe)
"Grip 3:16"	2020	Grip, JID	Proboscidea
"How Does It Feel"	2020	Deante' Hitchcock	Better (Deluxe)
"Raygun"	2020	redveil	Non-album single
"Tweak"	2020	DavidTheTragic	How It Feel
"Pennies...Exit Stage Left!?"	2021	Grip, Kay Nellz	I Died for This!?
"Pyro (Sango Leak)"	2021	Denzel Curry	Unlocked 1.5
"ANEMIC"	2021	DavidTheTragic	Non-album single
"Starts Right Here"	2021	League of Legends, Foreign Air	Non-album single
"Burning Bush"	2021	Grip	Non-album single
"Stick"	2022	Dreamville, JID, J. Cole, Sheck Wes	D-Day: A Gangsta Grillz Mixtape
"Overseas"	2022	Powers Pleasant, Maxo Kream, Bas, Erick The Architect	Non-album single
"Dance Now"	2022	JID	The Forever Story
"Just In Time"	2022	JID, Lil Wayne	The Forever Story
"Dawg!"	2022	Marco Plus	Tha Soufside Villain
"CENTIPEDE"	2022	Amindi	Non-album single
"DnD"	2023	Paris Texas	Mid Air
"Heaven On Beam"	2023	House 9 Jayxin	Heaven’s Auditorium
"LET’S PLAY"	2023	DavidTheTragic	Fried
"Flatline"	2023	TOBi	Panic
"Sked"	2023	Denzel Curry	King of the Mischievous South Vol. 2
"Pocket"	2023	Amindi	Take What You Need

== Music videos ==
=== As lead artist ===
List of music videos as lead artist, showing year released and director(s)
Title	Year	Director(s)
"Hit"	2019	Nasser Boulaich
"Angelic Hoodrat"	2020	Nasser Boulaich
"Chevron / PTSD"	2020	Nasser Boulaich
"Firestarter"	2020	Nasser Boulaich, Aditya Pamidi
"Exxon"	2020	Nasser Boulaich, Aditya Pamidi
