= Slimeball 3 =

Mixtape by Young Nudy
- Released: August 8, 2018
- Genre: Trap
- Length: 52:00
- Label: RCA
- Producer: Bixtel; BLSSD; Cardiak; Cubeatz; Fore'n; Illmind; Javar Rockamore; JetsonMade; Joe Millionaire; Kid Hazel; Pi'erre Bourne; Maaly Raw; Metro Boomin; Rex Kudo; Stonii; Tasha Catour; Wheezy; Yonni

Young Nudy chronology
Nudy Land (2017)	Slimeball 3 (2018)	Sli'merre (2019)

Singles from Slimeball 3
- 1. "Zone 6 (Remix)" Released: November 2, 2018

Professional ratings
Review scores
Source	Rating
Allmusic	4/5 stars
Pitchfork	7.2/10

Slimeball 3 is the fourth mixtape by American rapper Young Nudy. It was released on August 8, 2018, by RCA Records. It is a follow-up to 2017's Slimeball 2 and Nudy Land and serves as the third mixtape in the Slimeball series. The production was handled by several high-profile record producers, including Maaly Raw, Cardiak, Cubeatz, Illmind, Metro Boomin, Pi'erre Bourne, and Wheezy, among others. The album debuted at number 146 on the Billboard 200 albums chart in the United States. The mixtape was supported by one single, "Zone 6 (Remix)" featuring American rapper Future and American singer 6lack.

== Track listing ==
Credits adapted from Tidal.

No.	Title	Writer(s)	Producer(s)	Length
1.	"One Dolla"	Quantavious Thomas; Jordan Jenks	Pi'erre Bourne	2:43
2.	"Know What's Happenin"	Thomas; Javar Rockamore; Theodore Thomas	Rockamore; Stonii	3:25
3.	"Middle Fingers"	Thomas; Tariq Sharrieff; Julian Bixtel	BLSSD; Bixtel	3:21
4.	"Indastreet"	Thomas; Jamaal Henry; Kevin Gomringer; Tim Gomringer	Maaly Raw; Cubeatz	3:15
5.	"Friday"	Thomas; Carl McCormick; Ramon Ibanga, Jr.; Danielle Curiel; Desmond Peterson; Francesca Richard; George Ramirez; Joseph Domovitch; Omari Massenburg	Cardiak; Illmind; Yonni	2:58
6.	"Zone 6"	Thomas; Tahj Morgan; Jeremiah Maldonado	JetsonMade; Fore'n	3:02
7.	"Do That"	Thomas; Rockamore	Rockamore	3:01
8.	"ABM"	Thomas; Ahmar Bailey	Kid Hazel	3:59
9.	"Robbin and Gettin"	Thomas; Latasha Williams; Joseph Foster	Tasha Catour; Joe Millionaire	2:50
10.	"Mercy with Doubt"	Thomas; Williams	Tasha Catour	3:23
11.	"Unemotional"	Thomas; Bailey	Kid Hazel	3:18
12.	"Sherbert"	Thomas; Sharrieff; Bixtel	BLSSD; Bixtel	3:45
13.	"Right Now"	Thomas; Leland Wayne; Wesley Glass	Metro Boomin; Wheezy	5:05
14.	"Slimeball"	Thomas; Henry; Masamune Kudo	Maaly Raw; Rex Kudo	2:52
15.	"Zone 6" (Remix featuring Future and 6lack)	Thomas; Morgan; Maldonado; Nayvadius Wilburn; Ricardo Valentine, Jr.	JetsonMade; Fore'n	3:56
Total length:				52:00

== Personnel ==
- Cory Mo – mixing
- Joe LaPorta – mastering

== Charts ==
Chart (2018)	Peak position
US Billboard 200	146
