= Peaches & Eggplants =

2023 single by Young Nudy featuring 21 Savage

- Remix cover art

Single by Young Nudy featuring 21 Savage

from the album Gumbo
- Released: May 16, 2023
- Genre: Hip-hop; dirty rap
- Length: 3:23
- Label: RCA
- Songwriters: Quantavious Thomas; Shéyaa Abraham-Joseph; Edward Cooper III; Richard Sims, Jr; Miguel Willis; Reginald Jones; Jarvis Griffin
- Producer: Coupe

Young Nudy singles chronology
"Duntsane" (2022)	"Peaches & Eggplants" (2023)

21 Savage singles chronology
"06 Gucci" (2023)	"Peaches & Eggplants" (2023)

"Peaches & Eggplants" is a song by American rapper Young Nudy featuring his cousin, British-American rapper 21 Savage. It was sent to rhythmic contemporary radio on May 16, 2023, as the lead single from Nudy's fourth studio album, Gumbo (2023). The song was produced by Coupe, who wrote the song with the two artists.

== Composition ==
The production of the song contains a "pounding" drum, as well as synths. Young Nudy also imitates gunshot sounds in the song. Peter A. Berry of HipHopDX described the song as seeing the rappers "skitter across a subdued, yet ominous soundbed for a tongue-in-cheek strip club anthem that feels like Nudy's own twist on a Juicy J song."

== Critical reception ==
The song received generally favorable reviews. AllMusic described the production as "updating the tense simmer of some of the Neptunes' best late-aughts productions." In regard to Young Nudy's vocals, Andre Gee of Rolling Stone stated, "Even when he simulates gunshot bucks at the end of 'Peaches & Eggplant,' with 21 Savage, it sounds like he's being just forceful enough to be felt, but not so much so that he wrinkles his shirt. Nadine Smith of Pitchfork commented that the song "sounds like it could have been ghost-produced by BeatKing––it's a beguiling piece of strip-club minimalism propelled by little more than a pounding drum and a noodling synth line."

== Remix ==
On September 8, 2023, Nudy released a remix for the song featuring fellow rappers Latto and Sexyy Red.

== Charts ==
=== Weekly charts ===
Chart performance for "Peaches & Eggplants"
Chart (2023)	Peak position
Canada Hot 100 (Billboard)	93
Global 200 (Billboard)	148
US Billboard Hot 100	33
US Hot R&B/Hip-Hop Songs (Billboard)	7
US Rhythmic Airplay (Billboard)	30

=== Year-end charts ===
Year-end chart performance for "Peaches & Eggplants"
Chart (2023)	Position
US Billboard Hot 100	94
US Hot R&B/Hip-Hop Songs (Billboard)	31

== Certifications ==
Certifications for "Peaches & Eggplants"
Region	Certification	Certified units/sales
New Zealand (RMNZ)	Gold	15,000^{‡}
United States (RIAA)	2× Platinum	2,000,000^{‡}
^{‡} Sales+streaming figures based on certification alone.
