= Dr. Ev4l =

DR. Ev4l

Studio album by Young Nudy
- Released: May 18, 2021
- Genre: Hip-hop; trap; horrorcore
- Length: 45:01
- Label: RCA
- Producer: 20 Rocket; Bavier on the Beat; Coupe; Forthenight; Mahd McLaren; Mojo Krazy

Young Nudy chronology
Anyways... (2020)	DR. Ev4l (2021)	Rich Shooter (2021)

Professional ratings
Review scores
Source	Rating
AllMusic	3.5/5 stars
Beats Per Minute	79%/100
HipHopDX	3.7/5
Pitchfork	7.7/10

Dr. Ev4l is the second studio album by American rapper Young Nudy. It was released on May 18, 2021, via Young Nudy LLC under exclusive license to RCA Records. Production was handled by Coupe, 20 Rocket, Mahd McLaren, Mojo Krazy, Bavier On The Beat, and Forthenight. It features guest appearances from 21 Savage, G Herbo, and Lil Uzi Vert. The album debuted at number 93 on the US Billboard 200.

== Track listing ==
Dr. Ev4l track listing
No.	Title	Producer(s)	Length
1.	"Revenge"	Coupe	4:12
2.	"Mini Me"	Coupe	3:22
3.	"Yellow Tape" (featuring Lil Uzi Vert)	20 Rocket	3:17
4.	"Roughneck"	Coupe	2:51
5.	"Perc 30"	Coupe	3:27
6.	"The Rustlers"	Bavier on the Beat; Mojo Krazy	3:18
7.	"Child's Play" (featuring 21 Savage)	Coupe	3:05
8.	"Soul Keeper"	Coupe	3:04
9.	"2Face" (featuring G Herbo)	Coupe; Mojo Krazy; Forthenight	3:57
10.	"Scott Evil"	Mahd McLaren	4:02
11.	"Dr. Ev4l"	Mahd McLaren	2:59
12.	"Colombian Necktie"	20 Rocket	4:06
13.	"Walking Dead"	Coupe	3:16

== Charts ==
Chart performance for Dr. Ev4l
Chart (2021)	Peak position
US Billboard 200	93
