= Stunna 4 Vegas =

American rapper

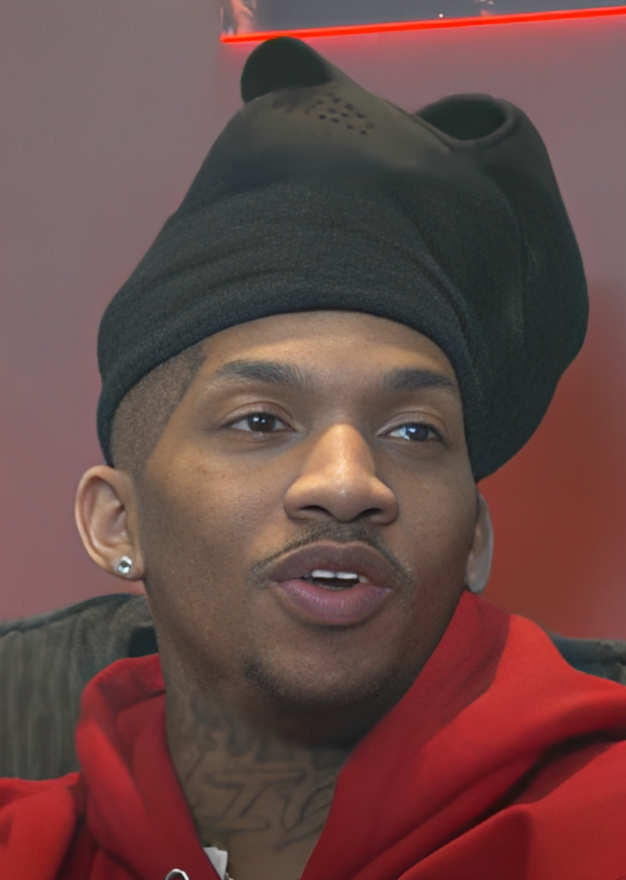
- Stunna 4 Vegas in 2021

Background information
- Also known as: Stunna; Big 4x; Rich Youngin
- Born: Khalick Antonio Caldwell; January 1, 1996 (age 30); Charlotte, North Carolina, U.S.
- Origin: Salisbury, North Carolina, U.S
- Genres: Southern hip-hop; gangsta rap; trap
- Occupations: Rapper; songwriter
- Years active: 2014–present
- Labels: Billion Dollar Baby; Interscope
- Spouse: Monaleo (m. 2025)
- Children: 1
- Website: officialstunna4vegas.com

Khalick Antonio Caldwell, better known as Stunna 4 Vegas (stylised as $tunna 4 Vegas), (born January 1, 1996) is an American rapper from Salisbury, North Carolina. He is best known for his 2020 single "Go Stupid" (with Polo G and NLE Choppa featuring Mike Will Made It), which received quadruple platinum certification by the Recording Industry Association of America (RIAA). Two years prior, he signed with fellow North Carolina–based rapper DaBaby's Billion Dollar Baby Entertainment, an imprint of Interscope Records to release his debut album, Big 4x (2019) and its follow-up, Rich Youngin (2020). Both albums performed moderately on the Billboard 200—the latter peaked at number 29 on the chart. His third and fourth albums, Welcome to 4 Vegas (2020) and Rae Rae's Son (2022), both failed to chart.

Despite having the city as part of his stage name, Caldwell claims no personal connection to Las Vegas; the "4" was adapted from his hometown area code.

== Early life ==
Khalick Caldwell grew up without a father figure, learning how to rap at an early age after figuring that he would not be successful in sports. Notwithstanding, he was a member of the basketball and football teams in high school.

His cousin is Green Bay Packers defensive tackle Javon Hargrave.

== Career ==
=== 2018: "Animal" and signing to DaBaby ===
In late September 2018, Caldwell released the track "Animal", which featured fellow North Carolina rapper DaBaby. The track gained popularity after it was posted on DaBaby's channel. Caldwell signed to DaBaby's record label Billion Dollar Baby Entertainment, and was featured on his track "4X" produced by Producer 20 (Igot20onmybeat) from his November 2018 mixtape Blank Blank.

=== 2019: Further success and debut album ===
Caldwell was featured on DaBaby's track "Joggers" from his debut album Baby on Baby in March 2019. He was then featured on Asian Da Brat's 2019 mixtape Unfuccwitable, on the track "I Love It".

In May 2019, Caldwell signed with Interscope Records. He then released his debut album under the label, BIG 4X, on May 10, 2019. The album contained guest features from DaBaby, Offset, NLE Choppa, Young Nudy, & Lil Durk. The album peaked at number 50 on the Billboard 200, and received positive reviews.

In the following months, he released singles such as "Tomorrow" featuring Moneybagg Yo, "Flintstones" featuring BannUpPrince, "Boat 4 Vegas" featuring Lil Yachty, "Up The Smoke" with Offset, and "Long." He revealed the album's title during an interview with music website Groovy Tracks. In September 2019, he was featured on the track "Really" from DaBaby's second studio album Kirk. The song debuted and peaked at number 63 on the Billboard Hot 100, making it Caldwell's first entry on the Hot 100.

=== 2020: Rich Youngin ===
On January 17, 2020, Caldwell released his second studio album, Rich Youngin. It included features from DaBaby, Lil Baby, Blac Youngsta, and Offset. It peaked at number 29 on the Billboard 200. The album received lukewarm reviews from critics.

In February 2020, Caldwell earned his first Billboard-charting single as a lead artist and his second charting single overall, with "Go Stupid" debuting and peaking at number 60 on the Billboard Hot 100. On July 27, 2020, Stunna 4 Vegas released a collaboration with DaBaby titled "No Dribble". Later on, in November 2020, Caldwell released his third studio album, Welcome to 4 Vegas, which included features from DaBaby, Murda Beatz, Toosii, and Ola Runt and did not chart.

=== Since 2022: Rae Rae's Son and Stunna 4 Files ===
On May 20, 2022, Caldwell released his fourth studio album, Rae Rae's Son which included features from DaBaby, Icewear Vezzo, NoCap, SpinaBenz and YRB Tezz. This was his final release with Billion Dollar Baby Entertainment.

On September 1, 2022, Caldwell was featured on "Big 6," a collaborative single with North Carolina artist Bos Flip. Later that same month, Caldwell released his fifth studio album, Stunna 4 Files.

== Discography ==
=== Studio albums ===
Title	Album details	Peak chart positions		
Title	Album details	US	US R&B/HH	US Rap
Big 4x	Released: May 8, 2019; Label: Billion Dollar Baby, Interscope; Format: CD, digital download, streaming	50	27	24
Rich Youngin	Released: January 17, 2020; Label: Billion Dollar Baby, Interscope; Format: CD, digital download, streaming	29	16	16
Welcome to 4 Vegas	Released: November 27, 2020; Label: Billion Dollar Baby, Interscope; Format: CD, digital download, streaming	—	—	—
Rae Rae's Son	Released: May 20, 2022; Label: Billion Dollar Baby, Interscope; Format: CD, digital download, streaming	—	—	—
4Ever	Released: February 23, 2024; Label: STB Entertainment; Format: CD, digital download, streaming	—	—	—

=== Compilation albums ===
Title	Mixtape details
Stunna 4 Files	Released: September 24, 2022; Label: WT4V Records; Format: Digital download, streaming

=== Mixtapes ===
Title	Mixtape details
Boot Up	Released: January 13, 2017; Label: Self-released; Format: Digital download
Stunna Season	Released: April 26, 2017; Label: Self-released; Format: Digital download
Young Nigga Shit	Released: September 25, 2017; Label: Self-released; Format: Digital download
4 Way or No Way	Released: January 26, 2018; Label: Self-released; Format: Digital download, streaming
Stunna Season 2	Released: September 3, 2018; Label: Self-released; Format: Digital download, streaming
4MF (4 My Fans Tape)	Released: June 27, 2025; Label: WT4V Records; Format: Digital download, streaming

=== Extended plays ===
Title	EP details
B4 Stunna Season 2	Released: September 2018; Label: Self-released; Format: Streaming
Slime Talk 1 (with Fat Dave)	Released: January 2019; Label: Self-released; Format: Streaming

=== Singles ===
==== As lead artist ====
Title	Year	Peak chart positions					Certifications	Album
Title	Year	US	US R&B/HH	CAN	IRE	NZ Hot	Certifications	Album
"Animal" (featuring DaBaby)	2018	—	—	—	—	—		Non-album singles
"Hell Yea"	2019	—	—	—	—	—		Non-album singles
"Billion Dollar Baby Freestyle" (featuring DaBaby)	2019	—	—	—	—	—		Non-album singles
"Rap Game Lebron"	2019	—	—	—	—	—		Non-album singles
"Goner" (with Blacc Zacc)	2019	—	—	—	—	—		Trappin Like Zacc
"Ashley" (featuring DaBaby)	2019	—	— (Note: "Ashley" did not enter the Hot R&B/Hip-Hop Songs chart, but peaked at number 6 on the Bubbling Under Hot R&B/Hip-Hop Songs chart.)	—	—	—		Big 4x
"Mr. 1 Take Freestyle" (with Chophouze)	2019	—	—	—	—	—		Non-album singles
"Boat 4 Vegas" (featuring Lil Yachty)	2019	—	—	—	—	—		Non-album singles
"Up the Smoke" (with Offset)	2019	—	—	—	—	—		Rich Youngin
"Do Dat" (featuring DaBaby and Lil Baby)	2020	—	—	—	—	—		Rich Youngin
"Change My Life" (with Blac Youngsta)	2020	—	—	—	—	—		Rich Youngin
"Go Stupid" (with Polo G and NLE Choppa featuring Mike Will Made It)	2020	60	29	28	97	16	RIAA: 4× Platinum; RMNZ: Gold	The Goat
"Freestyle"	2020	—	—	—	—	—		Non-album singles
"No Dribble" (with DaBaby)	2020	92	36	—	—	—	RIAA: Gold	Blame It on Baby (Deluxe)
"Gun Smoke"	2020	—	—	—	—	—		Welcome to 4 Vegas
"Suspect"	2022	—	—	—	—	—		Rae Rae's Son
"The One"	2022	—	—	—	—	—		Rae Rae's Son
"Pay Me to Speak"	2022	—	—	—	—	—		Rae Rae's Son
"BMF" (featuring Icewear Vezzo)	2022	—	—	—	—	—		Rae Rae's Son
"Made Men" (featuring Skilla Baby)	2023	—	—	—	—	—		4Ever
"Ask Around" (featuring YTB Fatt)	2023	—	—	—	—	—		4Ever
"Punch Me In Again"	2023	—	—	—	—	—		4Ever
"Go" (featuring Skilla Baby and Peso Peso)	2024	—	—	—	—	—		4Ever (Deluxe)

==== As featured artist ====
Title	Year	Album
"Casper" (Jonah Raine featuring Stunna 4 Vegas)	2018	Non-album single
"Fisherman" (Carus2cold featuring Stunna 4 Vegas)	2019	Pack Life
"The Wave" (Semi Sixteenz featuring Stunna 4 Vegas)	2019	Non-album singles
"Reloaded" (King Pin featuring Project Pat & Stunna 4 Vegas)	2019	Non-album singles
"Mana" (St0n3 featuring Stunna 4 Vegas)	2019	Non-album singles
"High Horse" (Teyg featuring Stunna 4 Vegas)	2019	Non-album singles
"Peephole" (Boogatti Boy featuring Stunna 4 Vegas)	2019	Non-album singles
"No Cap Zone" (Succeed Phlyguy featuring DaBaby & Stunna 4 Vegas)	2019	Non-album singles
"Pop Out" (Chop Mobb featuring Cash Hakavelli & Stunna 4 Vegas)	2019	Non-album singles
"Big Racks" (Producer 20 featuring 2 Lettaz OZ & Stunna 4 Vegas)	2019	Non-album singles
"Blitz" (Lilgaysoscammy featuring Stunna 4 Vegas)	2019	No Risk No Reward
"Mitchell & Ness" (Fat Dave featuring Stunna 4 Vegas)	2019	Non-album singles
"Talk Yo Shit" (Blaatina featuring Stunna 4 Vegas)	2019	Non-album singles
"Crank Up 2.0" (Dee Mula featuring Moneybagg Yo & Stunna 4 Vegas)	2019	Non-album singles
"Four's Up" (Dunny Kamakazi featuring Stunna 4 Vegas)	2019	Non-album singles
"All I Know" (CashMoneyAP featuring Rich the Kid and Stunna 4 Vegas)	2019	Non-album singles
"Back to Back" (Trap $wagg featuring Stunna 4 Vegas)	2019	Non-album singles
"No Case" (Dubie featuring Stunna 4 Vegas)	2019	Non-album singles
"Cream On Her Top" (SneakThePiper featuring Stunna 4 Vegas)	2019	Non-album singles
"Nawfside Menace" (HXNDRO featuring Stunna 4 Vegas)	2019	Non-album single
"Pack In" (Silk Dollar featuring Stunna 4 Vegas)	2020	TBA
"Get On Yo Shit" (Bloxk Rixh Fendi featuring Stunna 4 Vegas)	2020	TBA

=== Other charted songs ===
Title	Year	Peak chart positions		Album
Title	Year	US	US R&B/HH	Album
"Really" (DaBaby featuring Stunna 4 Vegas)	2019	63	30	Kirk

=== Guest appearances ===
Title	Year	Other artist(s)	Album
"Joggers"	2019	DaBaby	Baby on Baby
"I Love It"	2019	Asian Da Brat	Unfuccwitable
"Beast In The Studio"	2019	BannUpPrince	Bos Talk
"Really"	2019	DaBaby	Kirk
"Brand New"	2019	Yungeen Ace	Step Harder
"Fuck Nigga (Remix)"	2020	TLE Cinco	Self Conscious
"All I Know (Remix)"	2020	704Chop	Loyalty Means Everything
