= Angelic Hoodrat: Supercut =

Studio album by Kenny Mason
- Released: April 16, 2021
- Genre: Hip hop
- Length: 50:00
- Label: RCA
- Producer: Kenny Mason; Angel White; DvDx; SKFUL; Julian Cruz; Julien Earle; Juberlee; Roark Bailey; Michael Uzowuru

Kenny Mason chronology
Angelic Hoodrat (2020)	Angelic Hoodrat: Supercut (2021)	PUP PACK EP (2022)

Singles from Angelic Hoodrat: Supercut
- 1. "Partments" Released: February 19, 2021; 2. "Pup" Released: March 12, 2021; 3. "Play Ball" Released: March 26, 2021; 4. "Rih" Released: April 2, 2021

Professional ratings
Review scores
Source	Rating
Exclaim!	8/10
Fantastic Hip Hop	7.8/10
Stanford Daily	68/100

Angelic Hoodrat: Supercut is the second studio album by American rapper Kenny Mason. It was released on April 16, 2021, through RCA Records. The album contains 12 tracks.

== Track listing ==
No.	Title	Producer(s)	Length
1.	"43"	Kenny Mason	2:59
2.	"Rih"	Mason	2:31
3.	"A+" (featuring Denzel Curry)	SKUFL; Julian Cruz	2:48
4.	"Fasho"	Mason	3:19
5.	"Much Money" (featuring Freddie Gibbs)	Mason; DvDx	3:07
6.	"Play Ball"	Angel White; Cruz	2:40
7.	"Pup"	Mason; Cruz; SKUFL; DvDx	4:39
8.	"Titan" (featuring Angel White)	Mason; Cruz	5:24
9.	"Breathe Again" (featuring Ambar Lucid)	Mason; Cruz; DvDx	2:26
10.	"Partments"	Mason; Cruz	2:07
11.	"4ever"	Mason; Michael Uzowuru; Cruz	3:55
12.	"Storm"	Mason	2:23
Total length:			50:00
