= Pissy Pamper =

Unreleased 2019 song by Young Nudy and Pi'erre Bourne featuring Playboi Carti

Song by Young Nudy featuring Playboi Carti
- Released: April 18, 2019 (leak)
- Genre: Hip hop
- Length: 3:21
- Label: RCA
- Songwriters: Quantavious Thomas; Jordan Jenks; Jordan Carter; Makoto Matsushita; Scott Mescudi
- Producer: Pi'erre Bourne

Audio sample
- Audio sample featuring Young Nudy rapping and Playboi Carti's "baby voice".: file; help

"Pissy Pamper" (unofficially known under the de facto title "Kid Cudi") is an unreleased song by American rapper Young Nudy. It was produced by Pi'erre Bourne and features vocals by Playboi Carti. The song initially leaked online on April 18, 2019. An unofficial upload of the song featuring just Playboi Carti's verse topped the Spotify US Viral 50 chart in late May 2019, after a performance at the Coachella Valley Music and Arts Festival.

On December 22, 2020, a snippet of the song featuring new vocals from Kid Cudi himself was previewed on Playboi Carti's Twitter and TikTok accounts, leading to speculations about the song being released on Carti's second studio album Whole Lotta Red (2020). The song, however was ultimately unable to be released due to sample clearance issues.

== Background ==
"Pissy Pamper" was produced by Pi'erre Bourne for Sli'merre, his collaborative mixtape with Young Nudy. The song was not included on the mixtape due to a sample clearance issue. Young Nudy had sent the song to Playboi Carti to record a verse. Upon being sent back the verse, Nudy reacted by saying "Man, what the fuck is Carti talking about? He sound like a goddamn baby."

Carti's verse was first previewed on Instagram Live as a snippet in March 2019, where the song was dubbed "Kid Cudi" due to Carti referencing American rapper Kid Cudi by name twice: "Brand-new pack like Kid Cudi / I smoke dope like Kid Cudi". Internet memes, usually featuring NBA players of the Brooklyn Nets, using Carti's verse quickly became popular prior to the song's full leak.

== Composition ==
The song is built upon a sample of Japanese singer Mai Yamane's 1980 song "Tasogare". It is a "jazzy pop" song, with Young Nudy and Carti trading "stoned thoughts" in their verses. Carti uses his viral "baby voice" technique for his guest feature, with his voice hitting a high pitch with unclear pronunciations and frantic cadences. Due to the sample of Tasogare not being cleared, the song was never released.

== Leak and success ==
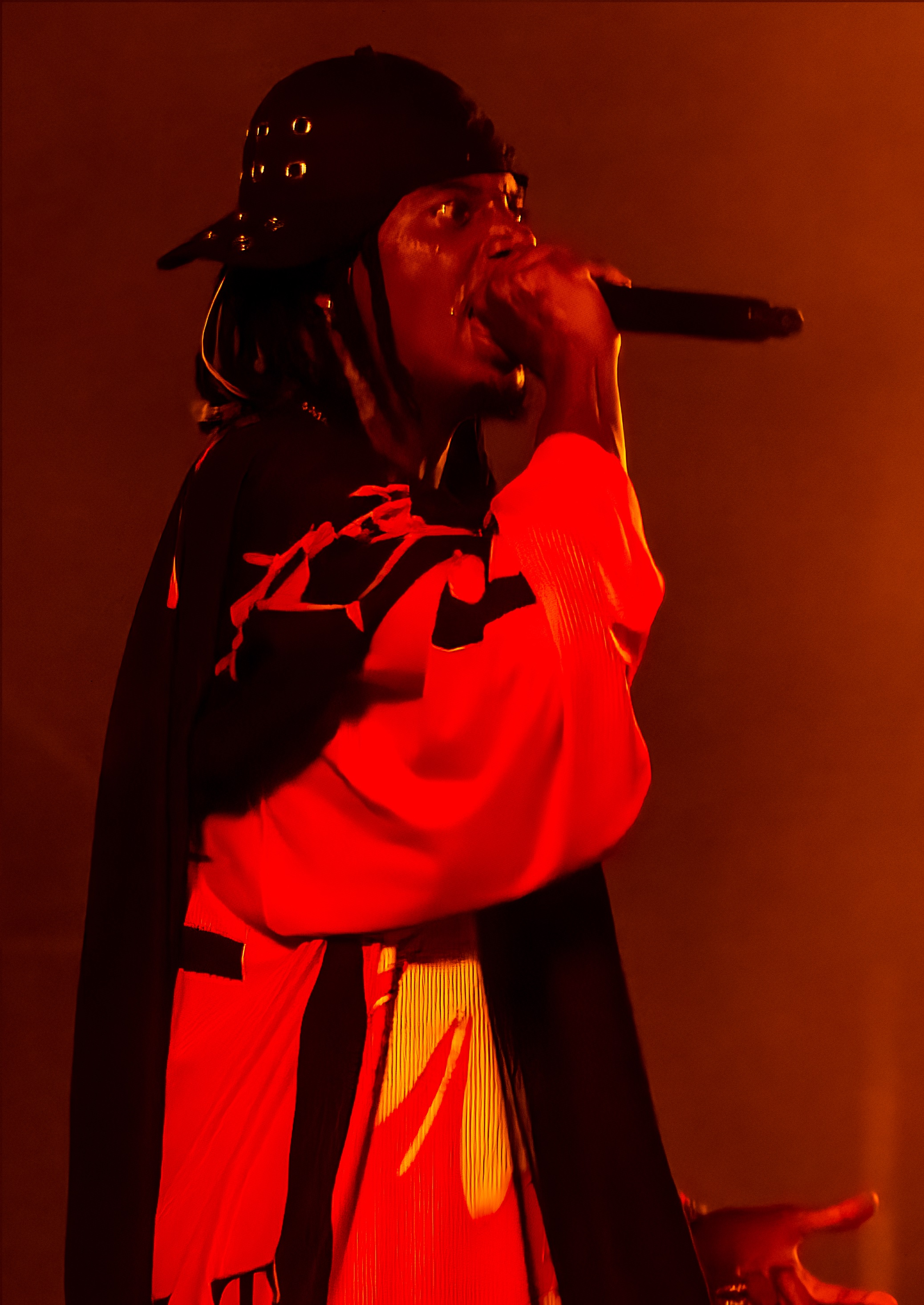
Playboi Carti's use of his high pitch "baby voice" allowed an unofficial upload of just his verse to top the Spotify US Viral 50 chart in May 2019

The song was leaked on April 18, 2019. The "baby voice" verse, a voice technique previously used by Carti on Solange's "Almeda" and Tyler, the Creator's "Earfquake", became popular and was boosted by Internet memes.

A high school sophomore under the name Lil Kambo uploaded Carti's verse to Spotify under the title "Kid Carti". In an interview with Genius, Kambo explained "I first made my Spotify account to post songs that aren’t already on Spotify. Before the song came out there was a snippet on YouTube and it sounded like it would be a hit if it was released. A couple weeks later the song got leaked and I posted it to my channel not thinking about how big it would get." After Kambo shared the link to his upload on Reddit, along with Carti's performance of his verse during his set at the 2019 Coachella Valley Music and Arts Festival, the unofficial upload topped the US Viral 50 chart on May 20, 2019, with over two million streams. The song was removed from Spotify on May 22, 2019. By June 26, 2019, another unofficial upload of Carti's verse, under the title "Kid Cudi Only Carti", by YungGen, had climbed up into the top 5 of the Spotify Viral 50 chart, but then got taken down. By July 2019, yet another unofficial upload of the full song, by King Zay, had climbed to the Spotify US Viral 50 chart until it was removed.

In a May 2019 interview with Pitchfork, Nudy stated that he did not "give a damn" that the song did not make it onto Sli'merre. He added that, "Sometimes you think you made the best song in the world, and someone come out the blue talking about, 'You can't use that sample.' You just gotta move on." Young Nudy reiterated that he "ain't give a fuck" that the song had leaked in a June 2019 interview with The Fader.

== Reception ==
On June 27, 2019, Connecticut Public Radio's The Colin McEnroe Show named "Pissy Pamper" as a contender for 2019 Song of the Summer. In a July 2019 article, the Phoenix New Times included "Pissy Pamper" on the newspaper's list of "Favorite Songs of 2019 (So Far)". In its year-end list, Pitchfork listed "Pissy Pamper" at number 43 on its list of the 100 best songs of 2019.

== See also ==
- "@ Meh", an officially released Playboi Carti single featuring his "baby voice"
