= Rich Youngin =

Studio album by Stunna 4 Vegas
- Released: January 17, 2020
- Genre: Hip hop; trap
- Length: 29:33
- Label: Billion Dollar Baby; Interscope
- Producer: Bankroll Got It; Hollo; Sean Da Firzt; Beat By Jeff; Cre8; DJ Lil Sprite; EVRGRN; Fokus P; Milan; Producer 20; Pyroman; Rvssian

Stunna 4 Vegas chronology
Big 4x (2019)	Rich Youngin (2020)	Welcome to 4 Vegas (2020)

Singles from Rich Youngin
- 1. "Up the Smoke" Released: November 8, 2019; 2. "Do Dat" Released: January 17, 2020; 3. "Change My Life" Released: January 20, 2020

Rich Youngin is the second studio album by American rapper Stunna 4 Vegas and it was released on January 17, 2020, by Billion Dollar Baby Entertainment and Interscope Records. It features guest appearances from his mentor/label boss DaBaby, and other rappers such as Lil Baby, Blac Youngsta and Offset. The album peaked at number 29 on the Billboard 200, making it his second entry on any chart after his previous album, Big 4X . The cover art for Rich Youngin is themed around an old-fashioned mansion with Stunna 4 Vegas's Maids. One is polishing his shoes while the others are standing around his house cleaning, or just standing there.

== Singles ==
The album was supported with three singles, the lead single "Up the Smoke" was released on November 8, 2019 and is a collaboration with American rapper and Migos member, Offset. The second single "Do Dat" was released on January 17, 2020 and it features his mentor/label boss DaBaby, and fellow American rapper Lil Baby, "Do Dat" is also at a small section at the bottom of the page. The third and final single "Change My Life" was also released on January 20, 2020, and it is a collaboration with American rapper Blac Youngsta.

== Music videos ==
The album is supported with seven music videos, The first music video is for "Change my Life", which is a collaboration with fellow rapper Blac Youngsta and the video was released the same day as the song. The second music video is for "Do Dat", which features his mentor/label boss DaBaby and fellow rapper Lil Baby, the music video was released the same day as the song on January 17, 2020. The third through seventh music videos for "On Fye", "Lou Will", "Fucking Up Freestyle", "Wet", and "A Hunnid" were all released on January 17, 2020, the same day as the album released.

== Critical reception ==
Professional ratings
Review scores
Source	Rating
HipHopDX	3/5
Pitchfork	4.9/10

Rich Youngin received mixed reviews from music critics. HipHopDX rated the album a three out of five, while Pitchfork rated the album a 4.9 out of ten. Critics made particular note of the quality of the guest features.

== Commercial performance ==
Rich Youngin debuted at number 29 on the Billboard 200, making it his second entry on any chart after his previous album, Big 4X . Rich Youngin also charted higher than his previous album, his previous album debuted at number 50, while this album debuted at number 29.

== Track listing ==
Rich Youngin track listing
No.	Title	Writer(s)	Producer(s)	Length
1.	"Do Dat" (featuring DaBaby and Lil Baby)	Khalick Caldwell; Jonathan Kirk; Dominique Jones; Joel Banks; Taylor Banks; Sean Mula	Bankroll Got It	2:56
2.	"On Fye"	Caldwell; Lamarcus Robertson; Mula	Hollo	2:43
3.	"R&Beef"	Caldwell; Jordan Ortiz	Fokus P	3:02
4.	"Change My Life" (with Blac Youngsta)	Caldwell; Sammie Benson; J. Banks; T. Banks; Mula	Bankroll Got It	2:33
5.	"Russian"	Caldwell; Nicolas Zita; Tarik Johnston	Pyroman; Rvssian	1:27
6.	"Punch Me in 5"	Caldwell; Anthony Mosley	Sean Da Firzt	2:45
7.	"Lou Will"	Caldwell; Ruslan Nikolaev	DJ Lil Sprite	2:42
8.	"Fucking Up Freestyle"	Caldwell; Jefferson Ogendi	Beat By Jeff	1:58
9.	"Wet"	Caldwell; Antwain Fox; Mosley	Producer 20; Sean Da Firzt	1:36
10.	"Up the Smoke" (with Offset)	Caldwell; Kiari Cephus; Corey Anderson; Amman Nurani	Cre8; EVRGRN	3:08
11.	"Walk Up"	Caldwell; Milan Tone	Tone	2:24
12.	"A Hunnid"	Caldwell; Mula; Robertson	Hollo	2:15
Total length:				29:33

=== Notes ===
- All tracks are stylized in all caps, for example "Do Dat" would be "DO DAT"

== Charts ==
Chart performance for Rich Youngin
Chart (2020)	Peak position
US Billboard 200	29
US Top R&B/Hip-Hop Albums (Billboard)	16

== Do Dat ==
"Do Dat"

Single by Stunna 4 Vegas featuring DaBaby and Lil Baby

from the album Rich Youngin
- Genre: Hip hop
- Length: 2:56
- Label: Billion Dollar Baby Entertainment, Interscope
- Songwriters: Khalick Caldwell; Jonathan Kirk; Dominique Jones; Joel Banks; Taylor Banks; Sean Mula
- Producer: Bankroll Got It

"Do Dat" (Stylized as "DO DAT") is a single by Stunna 4 Vegas, released on January 17, 2020. Featuring his mentor/label boss DaBaby and fellow rapper Lil Baby while being produced by Bankroll Got It. It serves as the second single to his second studio album, Rich Youngin and the music video is directed by Reel Goats. The music video sees the three rappers at a mansion with people, and there is an investigator that appears at the beginning and end of the music video that spies on the three, at the end, DaBaby finds the investigator and knocks him out, he then silently leaves.
