= Gumbo (Young Nudy album) =

2023 studio album by Young Nudy

Studio album by Young Nudy
- Released: February 28, 2023
- Genres: Hip-hop; trap
- Length: 43:53
- Label: RCA
- Producers: Cicero; Coupe; Kid Hazel; Naestro; Pi'erre Bourne

Young Nudy chronology
Rich Shooter (2021)	Gumbo (2023)

Singles from Gumbo
- 1. "Peaches & Eggplants" Released: May 16, 2023

Gumbo is the fourth studio album by American rapper Young Nudy, released on February 28, 2023 via RCA Records. The album features guest appearances from Key Glock and 21 Savage and chief production from Coupe. It was supported by the single "Peaches & Eggplants".

== Singles ==
The album's only single, "Peaches & Eggplants", was sent to rhythmic contemporary radio on May 16, 2023.

== Critical reception ==
Professional ratings
Aggregate scores
Source	Rating
Metacritic	82/100
Review scores
Source	Rating
AllMusic	4/5 stars
Clash	7/10
HipHopDX	4/5
Pitchfork	7.7/10

Gumbo was met with widespread critical acclaim. At Metacritic, which assigns a normalized rating out of 100 to reviews from professional publications, the album received an average score of 82, based on five reviews.

Thandie Sibanda of Clash wrote, "We can celebrate production credits across Nudy's discography and 'Gumbo' is no exception. While it may not be the East Atlanta rapper's best, it still stands as a solid successor to EA Monster". Andre Gee stated the album "excels musically based on Coupe's most impressive attribute: his ability to create melodic interplay between disparate textures" and added that Young Nudy "could have used the album to show a bit more of who Nudy from Eastside Atlanta is, as he does during revelatory moments on 'Fish & Chips' and 'Portabella.' But overall Gumbo is another strong offering from an artist who has mastered his craft, and is just fine sticking with it." Peter A. Berry of HipHopDX wrote, "Checking in at 13 tracks, the project distills Nudy's best qualities into a tidy package, and everything from its artwork to its beat selections and his deliveries on each song feels hyper-meticulous, yet loose enough so it doesn't feel rigid."

== Track listing ==
All tracks are written by Quantavious Thomas and Edward Cooper III and produced by Coupe, except where listed.

Gumbo track listing
No.	Title	Writer(s)	Producer(s)	Length
1.	"Brussel Sprout"			3:39
2.	"Pancake"			3:25
3.	"Portabella"			3:36
4.	"Pot Roast" (featuring Key Glock)	Thomas; Markeyvius Cathey; Jordan Jenks	Pi'erre Bourne	3:18
5.	"M.R.E."			3:18
6.	"McChicken"			3:05
7.	"Okra"			3:03
8.	"Peaches & Eggplants" (featuring 21 Savage)	Thomas; Shéyaa Abraham-Joseph; Cooper		3:23
9.	"Shrimp"	Thomas; Nicolas Muscadin	Naestro	4:00
10.	"Duck Meat"	Thomas; Rashan Kyles; Travis Marsh	Cicero	2:52
11.	"Fish & Chips"			2:53
12.	"Hot Grease"	Thomas; Ahmar Bailey	Kid Hazel	4:00
13.	"Passion Fruit"			3:14
Total length:				50:59

== Charts ==
Chart performance for Gumbo
Chart (2023)	Peak position
US Billboard 200	83
