= Anyways (album) =

Studio album by Young Nudy
- Released: February 24, 2020
- Genre: Hip-hop
- Length: 57:59
- Label: RCA
- Producer: 20 Rocket; BLSSD; Coupe; DJ Marc B; Jake One; Lamb; Mojo Krazy; Young Lord Sean

Young Nudy chronology
Sli'merre (2019)	Anyways (2020)	Dr. Ev4l (2021)

Singles from Anyways
- 1. "No Go" Released: January 28, 2020

Professional ratings
Review scores
Source	Rating
AllMusic	4/5 stars
Exclaim!	9/10
Pitchfork	7.5/10

Anyways (also written with an ellipsis, as Anyways...) is the debut studio album by American rapper Young Nudy. It was released on February 24, 2020, through RCA Records. Production was handled by 20 Rocket, BLSSD, Coupe, DJ Marc B, Jake One, Lamb, Mojo Krazy, and Young Lord Sean. The album debuted at number 109 on the Billboard 200 in the United States. It was supported by the single "No Go", which was released on January 28, 2020.

== Track listing ==
Anyways... track listing
No.	Title	Writer(s)	Producer(s)	Length
1.	"Understanding"	Quantavious Thomas; Marcus Bennett	DJ Marc B	4:35
2.	"No Go"	Thomas; Delvin Northcut	20 Rocket	3:12
3.	"Blue Cheese Salad"	Thomas; Edward Cooper III	Coupe	3:34
4.	"GTA Lyfestyle"	Thomas; Cooper III; Sean Robertson	Coupe; Young Lord Sean	3:15
5.	"A Nudy Story"	Thomas; Cooper III; Northcut	Coupe; 20 Rocket	3:32
6.	"Deeper Than Rap"	Thomas; Cooper III	Coupe	3:32
7.	"Cap Dem"	Thomas; Cooper III; Northcut	Coupe; 20 Rocket	3:55
8.	"That's Why"	Thomas; Maurice McAdams	Lamb	3:41
9.	"No Comprende"	Thomas; Northcut	20 Rocket	3:48
10.	"Fuck Me Mean"	Thomas; Northcut	20 Rocket	4:02
11.	"Influencer"	Thomas; Tariq Sharrieff	BLSSD	3:57
12.	"I Won't Flex"	Thomas; Northcut	20 Rocket	3:06
13.	"Anyways"	Thomas; Cooper III; Northcut	Coupe; 20 Rocket	3:27
14.	"No Pretending"	Thomas; Cooper III; Jacob Dutton	Coupe; Jake One	2:57
15.	"Marathon"	Thomas; Jakhari Fears	Mojo Krazy	4:00
16.	"Do It With The..."	Thomas; Cooper III	Coupe	3:24
Total length:				57:59

== Personnel ==
- Alverne "Verne" Emmanuel – mixing & recording
- Colin Leonard – mastering (track 2)

== Charts ==
Chart performance for Anyways...
Chart (2020)	Peak position
US Billboard 200	109
