= Big 4x =

Studio album by Stunna 4 Vegas
- Released: May 10, 2019
- Genre: Hip hop
- Length: 30:11
- Label: Billion Dollar Baby; Interscope
- Producer: Producer 20; DeeJayTrap; JetsonMade; Ron Lui; 1st Class; Sean Da Firzt; Cre8; DJ K.i.D; Milan Torne

Stunna 4 Vegas chronology
Stunna Season 2 (2018)	Big 4x (2019)	Rich Youngin (2020)

Singles from Big 4x
- 1. "Ashley" Released: July 18, 2019

Big 4x (stylized in all caps) is the debut studio album by American rapper Stunna 4 Vegas. It was released on May 10, 2019, by Billion Dollar Baby Entertainment and Interscope Records. The album features guest appearances from Offset, NLE Choppa, Young Nudy, his mentor/label boss DaBaby, and Lil Durk. The album peaked at number 50 on the Billboard 200 which made it his first entry on any charts.

== Promotion ==
"Ashley" featuring DaBaby, was released as the album's lead single on July 18, 2019, along with a music video, however the music video is on DaBaby's channel.

== Music videos ==
- A music video for "Intro" was released on May 10, 2019.
- A music video for "Punch Me In Pt. 4" was released on May 24, 2019.
- A music video for "Big 4x Freestyle" was released on May 28, 2019.
- A music video for "Double D's" was released on September 5, 2019.
- A music video for "100 or Better" featuring NLE Choppa was released on November 19, 2019.

== Critical reception & Commercial performance ==
Big 4x received generally positive reviews. Erika Marie of HotNewHipHop called the album "impressive" and "solid". John Yu of KZSC Santa Cruz said the album was "full of potential and high-energy songs". Big 4x debuted at number 50 on the Billboard 200 on the week ending May 24, 2019, making it his first entry on any Billboard chart.

== Track listing ==
No.	Title	Writer(s)	Producer(s)	Length
1.	"Intro"	Khalick Caldwell; Daniel "DeeJayTrap" Sekyi; Antwain "Producer 20" Fox	DeeJayTrap; Producer 20	2:08
2.	"Sticks" (featuring DaBaby)	Caldwell; Jonathan Kirk; Tahj Morgan	JetsonMade	3:04
3.	"Big 4x Freestyle"	Caldwell; Ronald "Ron Lui" Johnson	Ron Lui	2:02
4.	"4th of July" (featuring Offset)	Caldwell; Kiari Cephus; Milan Torne	Torne	2:11
5.	"Fuckery"	Caldwell; Johnson	Ron Lui	2:30
6.	"100 or Better" (featuring NLE Choppa)	Caldwell; Bryson Potts; Fox	Producer 20	2:47
7.	"Double D's"	Caldwell; Fox	Producer 20	2:36
8.	"Havin My Way" (featuring Young Nudy)	Caldwell; Quantavious Thomas; Morgan; Khaleel "1st Class" Griffin	JetsonMade; 1st Class	2:57
9.	"Hittin 4"	Caldwell; Corey "Cre8" Anderson	Cre8	2:00
10.	"Ashley" (featuring DaBaby)	Caldwell; Kirk; Anthony "Sean Da Firzt" Mosley	Sean Da Firzt	2:32
11.	"Punch Me In, Pt. 4"	Caldwell; Fox	Producer 20	2:22
12.	"Durkio" (featuring Lil Durk)	Caldwell; Durk Banks; DeJuane Dunwood; Sekyi	DJ K.i.D; DeeJayTrap	3:02
Total length:				30:11

== Personnel ==
Credits adapted from Tidal

- Khalick Antonio Caldwell – vocals
- Jonathan Lyndale Kirk – vocals (tracks: 2, 10)
- Kiari Kendrell Cephus – vocals (track 4)
- Bryson Lashun Potts – vocals (track 6)
- Quantavious Tavario Thomas – vocals (track 8)
- Durk Derrick Banks – vocals (track 12)
- Antwain Lamont Fox – producer (tracks: 1, 6, 7, 11), recording (tracks: 1, 3, 5–7, 11, 12)
- Daniel Sekyi – producer (tracks: 1, 12)
- Tahj Morgan – producer and recording (tracks: 2, 8)
- Ronald Luis Johnson – producer (tracks: 3, 5)
- Milan Torne – producer (track 4)
- Khaleel Griffin – producer (track 8)
- Corey Anderson – producer (track 9)
- Anthony Lesean Mosley – producer (track 10)
- De Juane Malachi Dunwood – producer (track 12), recording (track 10)
- Weston McKnight – recording (track 4)
- BJ Mekk – recording (track 9)
- Kevin Mccloskey – mixing

== Charts ==
Chart (2019)	Peak position
US Billboard 200	50
US Top R&B/Hip-Hop Albums (Billboard)	27
