= Young Nudy =

American rapper (born 1992)

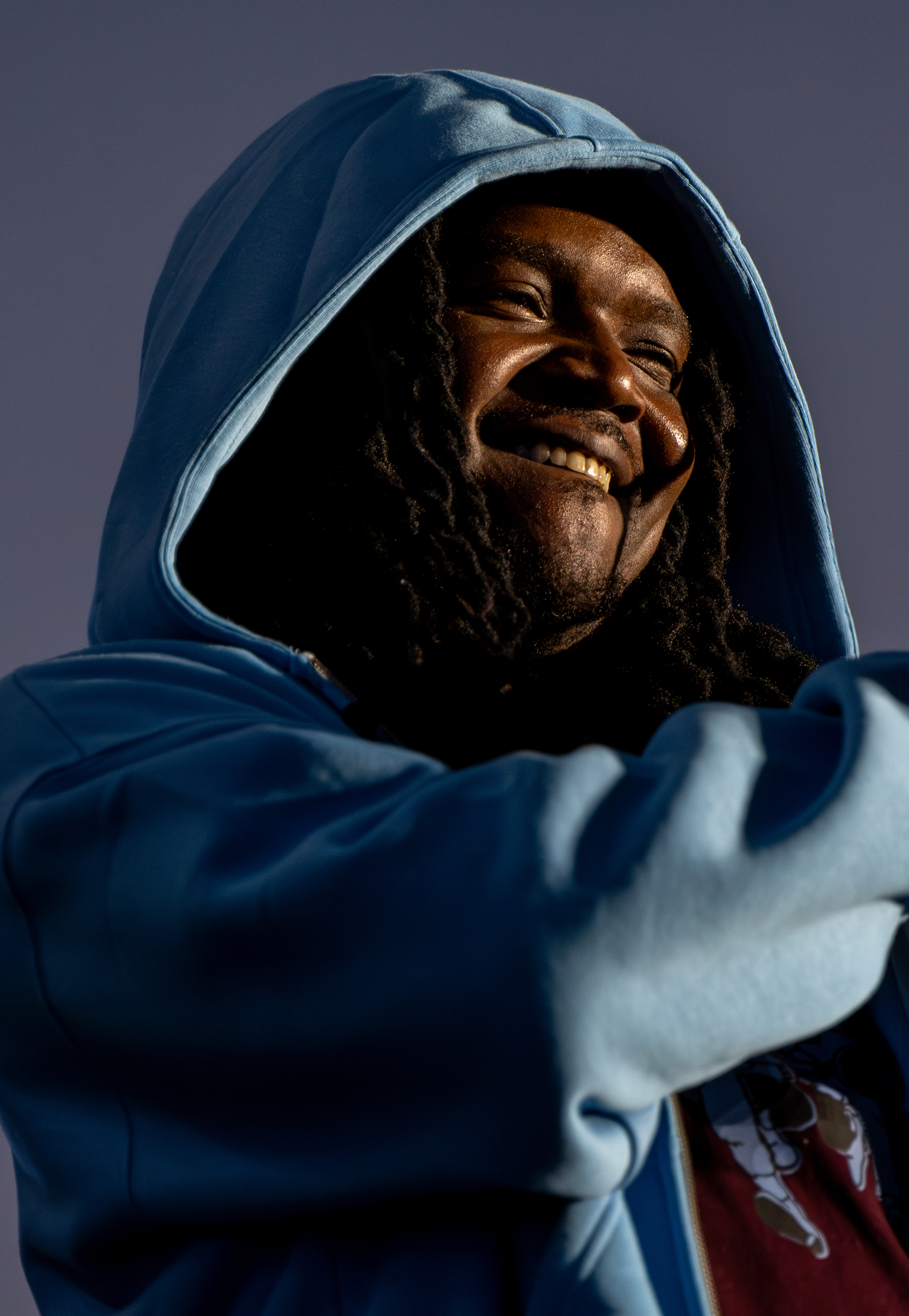
- Young Nudy in 2024

Background information
- Also known as: PDE Young Nudy; Slimeball
- Born: Quantavious Tavario Thomas; December 17, 1992 (age 33); Atlanta, Georgia, U.S.
- Genres: Southern hip-hop; trap; gangsta rap
- Occupations: Rapper; singer; songwriter
- Years active: 2014–present
- Labels: Paradise East; RCA; Same Plate
- Children: 1
- Relatives: 21 Savage (cousin)
- Website: youngnudy.com

Quantavious Tavario Thomas (born December 17, 1992), known professionally as Young Nudy, is an American rapper and singer. Based in Atlanta, Georgia, he is the cousin of fellow rapper 21 Savage. Thomas signed with RCA Records to release his debut studio album Anyways (2020), which was followed by Dr. Ev4l (2021), Rich Shooter (2021), EA Monster (2022), Gumbo (2023), which spawned the single "Peaches and Eggplants" (featuring 21 Savage), which peaked within the top 40 of the Billboard Hot 100, PARADISE (2025) and Just Doin Me (2026).

Thomas initially gained fame for his Slimeball mixtape series, which led to him to sign with RCA and Same Plate Entertainment to release Slimeball 3 in 2018. His collaborative album with Pi'erre Bourne, Sli'merre (2019), became his breakout project and peaked at number 63 on the Billboard 200. During this time, he also became known for his unreleased song "Pissy Pamper" (with Pi'erre Bourne featuring Playboi Carti), which became a viral Internet meme following its leak that same year. Also in 2019, he guest appeared on Dreamville Records' single "Down Bad", which became his first entry—at number 64—on the Billboard Hot 100.

== Early life ==
Thomas was born on December 17, 1992, on the east side of Atlanta, Georgia. He lived in the Paradise East Apartments. He is a cousin of 21 Savage. Thomas grew up with his mother, but says he had a closer relationship with his grandparents. He is of Jamaican descent.

== Career ==
=== 2015–2018: Slimeball 2, Nudy Land, and Slimeball 3 ===
In 2015, Thomas was featured on 21 Savage's song "Air It Out". Later that year, Thomas released the collaborative mixtape Paradise 2 East Atlanta with rapper Kourtney Money. In 2017, Thomas released the sequel to Slimeball: Slimeball 2, which featured artists including Juicy J, Drugrixh Peso, 21 Savage, Kourtney Money, as well as production by Metro Boomin, Pi'erre Bourne, and Richie Souf. Its lead single, "EA" (featuring 21 Savage) garnered 146 million streams on Spotify, and was certified Platinum by the Recording Industry Association of America (RIAA).

In late 2017, Thomas released the Nudy Land mixtape, which featured rappers Offset and Lil Yachty. It was once more produced by Pi'erre Bourne.

Prior to the release of Slimeball 3, Thomas signed a multi-million dollar, four-album record deal with Paradise East Records, RCA Records and Same Plate Entertainment.

In August 2018, Thomas released the 14-track Slimeball 3 mixtape, as the sequel to the previous Slimeballs. The mixtape featured production by Pi'erre Bourne, Metro, Wheezy, 13teen and Maaly Raw, among others. Previous singles "Do That" and "Sherbert" were among the 14 tracks on the mixtape. The mixtape became Thomas's first charting project on the Billboard 200, peaking at number 146. The project has a total of over 18 million streams on Apple Music as of May 2019.

=== 2019–2020: Faded in the Booth, Sli'merre, and Anyways ===
In April 2019, Thomas released a surprise project titled Faded in the Booth. Just two weeks before the release of the mixtape Sli'merre, a collaborative project with producer Pi'erre Bourne, a song entitled "Pissy Pamper" with Playboi Carti surfaced. The track initially intended to be released as a part of Sli'merre, but it was not due to sample clearance issues. The track became an internet meme, with Playboi Carti performing the song at Coachella, and a slightly altered version peaking at number 1 on Spotify's US Viral 50. Following this, Sli'merre debuted at number 167 on the US Billboard 200 and peaked at number 63 the following week. The album included guest appearances from 21 Savage, Megan Thee Stallion, DaBaby, and Lil Uzi Vert.

On May 11, producer ChaseTheMoney revealed what was thought to be a tracklist for Thomas's debut album, CTMX2. The tracklist has a number of artists such as Billie Eilish, Young Thug and most notably featured the song "God Flinch" featuring Thomas, J. Cole and Drake; the song was eventually released without Drake as "Sunset" on Dreamville's mixtape Revenge of the Dreamers III on July 5, 2019. Thomas appeared on the Cole-executively produced album twice, including the aforementioned "Sunset" and on the single "Down Bad" along with JID, Bas, EarthGang and Cole himself. Later on, Young Nudy, alongside Calboy were added as supporting acts on 21 Savage's I Am Greater than I Was Tour across the United States.

On November 20, 2019, the Grammy Awards announced the nominations for the 62nd Annual Grammy Awards, in which Thomas was nominated for his feature on the 2019 Dreamville Records single 'Down Bad", along with JID, Bas, J. Cole and Earthgang, as well as for his contributions to the aforementioned record label's compilation album Revenge of the Dreamers 3 and his cousin 21 Savage's I Am Greater Than I Was.

On February 27, 2020, Young Nudy released his debut studio album titled Anyways, which totaled 16 tracks. The album received positive critical reception, receiving a 7.5/10 by Pitchfork critic Israel Daramola. The album peaked at 109 on the Billboard 200.

After the release of Anyways, in 2020, Young Nudy announced a North American tour which was set to run from March 20 to April 30, and travel to 25 different cities in the United States. However, COVID-19 concerns caused the tour to be postponed.

=== 2021-2022: Dr. Ev4l, Rich Shooter, and EA Monster ===
On May 18, 2021, Thomas released his second studio album, Dr. Ev4l. It features fellow rappers Lil Uzi Vert, 21 Savage, and G Herbo, with production from Coupe, Mojo, Bavier, and 20 Rocket. The album was preceded by the May 11-released single "2Face", featuring G Herbo. The album was released to generally positive reviews and peaked at 93 on the Billboard 200.

In May 2021, Nudy and 21 Savage's track "EA" from Nudy's 2017 mixtape SlimeBall 3 went viral after a video in which the song plays shows a floor collapsing at a graduation party, with the partygoers falling through the floor. Nudy responded to the incident and donated money to the homeowner.

On August 4, 2021, Thomas introduced his third studio project, Rich Shooter. It released to generally positive reviews, with Pitchfork giving it a 7.8/10, while AllMusic awarded it 4/5 stars. The project included 7 total guest features, notably from Future and Gucci Mane. Rich Shooter is Nudy's longest project to date, featuring 20 tracks and a total runtime of 1 hour and 6 minutes. The work peaked at 123rd on the Billboard Hot 200.

On August 8, 2022, Nudy released his sixth mixtape overall, EA Monster. The official album cover was created by artist Liam Archibald. The project, like many of his previous works, received generally positive reviews, with Steve Juon of RapReviews giving the work a 6.5/10 overall score, praising his style: "(Nudy's) artistic vision paints a portrayal of a dude who is living Halloween all year 'round." The album includes only one feature, labelmate BabyDrill, on the track "Duntsane".

=== 2023-present: Gumbo, Sli'merre 2, and Paradise ===
In 2023, Young Nudy's song "Peaches & Eggplants" released as the lead single from his fourth studio album Gumbo, after which became a viral hit, peaking at 33 on the Billboard Hot 100. Following this success, the song was remixed, including features from Latto and Sexxy Redd, officially releasing on September 7th of the same year. In July, he made an appearance on Ateyaba's second album on the title Ghana, and soon after released the single John Wayne, which was produced by Metro Boomin.

On November 6th, 2024, Nudy and Pi'erre Bourne released the lead single "Right Now" for the next collaborative project between the two, Sli'merre 2, and announced the official release as the 13th of that same month, also sharing the tracklist and the official cover art. The album released to mixed reception, receiving a 5.5/10 critic score from Pitchfork.

On August 8th, 2025, Nudy released his fifth studio album, Paradise. The project was supported by two lead singles, BTA and Iced Tea, with the latter featuring 21 Savage and Project Pat. The second track, What's Happenin' featuring Latto and produced by Coupe, became a viral TikTok sensation due to a lyric criticizing U.S. president Donald Trump, amassing over 37,000 uses on the platform as of May 2026. Following this, Nudy went on a joint tour with fellow rapper JID, titled "God Does Like Paradise". The tour's North American section ran from October 15th to December 16th of the same year, and featured 34 total stops.

== Legal issues ==
On February 3, 2019, while Nudy and his cousin 21 Savage were riding in a car in Atlanta, they were pulled over by police and arrested in an operation targeting Nudy and two other men. Savage was arrested by Immigration and Customs Enforcement and charged with being in the United States illegally from Britain. Nudy was charged with aggravated assault and violation of the Georgia Gang Act. Nudy's lawyer stated "We believe that Young Nudy is innocent and this is a case of mistaken identity. Young Nudy's legal team is working closely with law enforcement to ensure this case does not get blown out of proportion." Nudy's attorney stated that the charges stem from a 2017 investigation, which he states Atlanta Police investigated Nudy on and dropped the charges. On February 12, Savage was released on bail, and on February 19, Nudy was granted $100,000 bail, and was released the next day.

== Musical style ==
Young Nudy raps, combining elements of hip-hop and contemporary R&B. Nudy's style has been compared to other rappers such as 03 Greedo, Yung Bans, and Lil Keed. Despite his close relationship with his cousin 21 Savage, he has been noted for having a "completely opposite" style from Savage.

== Discography ==
=== Studio albums ===
Title	Details	Peak chart positions
Title	Details	US
Anyways	Released: February 24, 2020; Label: RCA; Formats: Digital download, streaming	109
Dr. Ev4l	Released: May 18, 2021; Label: RCA; Formats: Digital download, streaming	93
Rich Shooter	Released: August 4, 2021; Label: RCA; Formats: Digital download, streaming	123
Gumbo	Released: February 28, 2023; Label: RCA; Formats: Digital download, streaming	83
PARADISE	Released: August 8, 2025; Label: RCA; Formats: Digital download, streaming	
Just Doin Me	Released: October 28, 2026; Label: Atlantic; Formats: Digital download, streaming	

=== Collaborative albums ===
Title	Details	Peak chart positions	
Title	Details	US	US R&B/HH
Sli'merre (with Pi'erre Bourne)	Released: May 8, 2019; Label: RCA; Formats: Digital download, streaming	63	35
Sli'merre 2 (with Pi'erre Bourne)	Released: November 13, 2024; Label: RCA; Formats: Digital download, streaming	—	—
"—" denotes a recording that did not chart or was not released in that territory.

=== Mixtapes ===
Title	Details	Peak chart positions
Title	Details	US
Slimeball	Released: August 8, 2016; Label: 1230 Entertainment; Format: Digital download, streaming	—
Slimeball 2	Released: August 11, 2017; Label: Paradise East; Format: Digital download, streaming	—
Nudy Land	Released: September 13, 2017; Label: Paradise East; Format: Digital download, streaming	—
Slimeball 3	Released: August 8, 2018; Label: RCA; Formats: Digital download, streaming	146
Faded in the Booth	Released: August 21, 2019; Label: RCA; Formats: Digital download, streaming	—
EA Monster	Released: August 8, 2022; Label: RCA; Formats: Digital download, streaming	135
"—" denotes a recording that did not chart or was not released in that territory.

=== Singles ===
==== As lead artist ====
List of singles as a lead artist
Title	Year	Peak chart positions					Certifications	Album(s)
Title	Year	US	US R&B /HH	US Rap	CAN	WW	Certifications	Album(s)
"Since When" (featuring 21 Savage)	2018	—	—	—	—	—		Non-album single
"Zone 6" (solo or featuring Future and 6lack)	2018	—	—	—	—	—		Slimeball 3
"Mister" (featuring 21 Savage)	2019	—	—	—	—	—		Sli'merre
"Extendo" (featuring Lil Uzi Vert)	2019	—	—	—	—	—		Sli'merre
"No Go"	2020	—	—	—	—	—		Anyways
"Vice City"	2021	—	—	—	—	—		Non-album single
"Peaches & Eggplants" (featuring 21 Savage or Remix featuring Latto and Sexyy Red)	2023	33	7	6	93	148	RIAA: Platinum	Gumbo
"—" denotes a recording that did not chart or was not released in that territory.

==== As featured artist ====
Title	Year	Peak chart positions					Certifications	Album
Title	Year	US	US R&B/HH	US Rap	CAN	NZ Hot	Certifications	Album
"Down Bad" (Dreamville featuring J. Cole, JID, Bas, EarthGang, and Young Nudy)	2019	64	26	24	69	10	RIAA: Platinum; RMNZ: Gold	Revenge of the Dreamers III

=== Other charted and certified songs ===
Title	Year	Peak chart positions		Certifications	Album(s)
Title	Year	US	US R&B/HH	Certifications	Album(s)
"EA" (featuring 21 Savage)	2017	—	—	RIAA: Platinum; RMNZ: Gold	Slimeball 2
"Hell Shell"	2017	—	—	RIAA: Gold	Nudy Land
"4L" (21 Savage featuring Young Nudy)	2018	— (Note: "4L" did not enter the Billboard Hot 100, but peaked at number 18 on the Bubbling Under Hot 100 chart.)	— (Note: "4L" did not enter the Hot R&B/Hip-Hop Songs chart, but peaked at number three on the Bubbling Under R&B/Hip-Hop Singles chart.)		I Am > I Was
"Sunset" (Dreamville featuring J. Cole and Young Nudy)	2019	— (Note: "Sunset" did not chart on the Billboard Hot 100, but did peak at number 13 on the Bubbling Under Hot 100 chart.)	50		Revenge of the Dreamers III
"Money Spread" (Lil Uzi Vert featuring Young Nudy)	2020	89	50		Lil Uzi Vert vs. the World 2
"Snitches & Rats" (21 Savage and Metro Boomin featuring Young Nudy)	2020	61	28		Savage Mode 2
"Umbrella" (with Metro Boomin and 21 Savage)	2022	23	7		Heroes & Villains
"Stepbrothers" (with 21 Savage)	2025	89	15		What Happened to the Streets?
"—" denotes a recording that did not chart or was not released in that territory.

=== Guest appearances ===
List of non-single guest appearances, with other performing artists, showing year released and album name
Title	Year	Other artist(s)	Album
"4L"	2018	21 Savage	I Am > I Was
"Havin My Way"	2019	Stunna 4 Vegas	Big 4x
"Attitude"	2020	Deante' Hitchcock	Better
"Ends"	2020	Smokepurpp	Florida Jit
"Deep Blue"	2021	Isaiah Rashad	The House Is Burning (homies begged)
"Richer Dreams"	2021	Pi'erre Bourne, TM88	Yo!88
"NICE"	2022	Cochise	THE INSPECTION
"Moving Too Fast"	2022	Pi'erre Bourne	Good Movie
"SPIN N FLIP"	2022	Kenny Mason	Ruffs
"Umbrella"	2022	Metro Boomin, 21 Savage	Heroes & Villains
"PB&J"	2023	Lil Gnar, Chief Keef	—N/a
"Ghana"	2023	Ateyaba	La Vie en Violet
"Act Up"	2023	Killer Mike	MICHAEL (Deluxe)
"Say Too Much"	2023	Kaliii	FCK GIRL SZN
"Middle of the Hood"	2023	Young Scooter	Streetz Krazy
"Little Foot Big Foot"	2024	Childish Gambino	Atavista
"Shrimp & Grits"	2024	Latto	Sugar Honey Iced Tea
"Stepbrothers"	2025	21 Savage	What Happened to the Streets?
