= Sli'merre =

Mixtape by Young Nudy and Pi'erre Bourne
- Released: May 8, 2019
- Genre: Hip-hop
- Length: 39:49
- Label: RCA
- Producer: Pi'erre Bourne

Young Nudy chronology
Faded in the Booth (2019)	Sli'merre (2019)	Anyways (2020)

Pi'erre Bourne chronology
Pi'erre & Cardo's Wild Adventure (2018)	Sli'merre (2019)	The Life of Pi'erre 4 (2019)

Singles from Sli'merre
- 1. "Mister" Released: April 23, 2019; 2. "Extendo" Released: May 1, 2019

Professional ratings
Review scores
Source	Rating
AllMusic	4/5 stars
The Guardian	4/5 stars
Pitchfork	8/10
RapReviews	6/10

Sli'merre is a collaborative mixtape by American rapper Young Nudy and American record producer Pi'erre Bourne. It was released on May 8, 2019, by RCA Records. It features guest appearances from 21 Savage, DaBaby, Lil Uzi Vert, and Megan Thee Stallion, while the production was handled entirely by Pi'erre. The album peaked at number 63 on the Billboard 200 albums chart in the United States. The mixtape was supported by two singles: "Mister" and "Extendo".

== Background ==
"Pissy Pamper" is an unreleased song that leaked on April 18, 2019, which was meant for Sli'merre, but was scrapped due to sample clearance issues. It features American rapper Playboi Carti, performing his "baby voice" verse, a voice technique previously used by Carti on American singer Solange's "Almeda". The song went viral on social media, which resulted an unofficial upload of the song, featuring just Carti's verse, to top the Spotify US Viral 50 chart in May 2019.

== Track listing ==
All tracks produced by Pi'erre Bourne.

No.	Title	Writer(s)	Length
1.	"Long Ride"	Quantavious Thomas; Jordan Jenks	4:20
2.	"Mister" (featuring 21 Savage)	Thomas; Jenks; Shéyaa Abraham-Joseph; Joseph Hall III	2:54
3.	"Sunflower Seeds"	Thomas; Jenks	3:02
4.	"Hot Wings"	Thomas; Jenks	3:40
5.	"Shotta" (featuring Megan Thee Stallion)	Thomas; Jenks; Megan Pete	2:44
6.	"Dispatch" (featuring DaBaby)	Thomas; Jenks; Jonathan Kirk	3:05
7.	"Black Hippie, White Hipster"	Thomas; Jenks	2:38
8.	"Extendo" (featuring Lil Uzi Vert)	Thomas; Jenks; Symere Woods; August Johnson; Stephen Beckmeier	4:19
9.	"Gas Station"	Thomas; Jenks	2:58
10.	"Swisher Backwood"	Thomas; Jenks	2:59
11.	"Call Dat Bitch Homicide"	Thomas; Jenks	3:34
12.	"Joker"	Thomas; Jenks	3:30
Total length:			39:49

Sample credits

- "Mister" contains a sample of "Lady", written by Joseph Hall III and performed by The Blackbyrds.
- "Extendo" contain samples of "There She Goes Again", written by August Johnson and Stephen Beckmeier and performed by Side Effect.

== Personnel ==
- Pi'erre Bourne – mixing (tracks: 1, 9, 12), recording (tracks: 2, 3, 8, 12)
- Bradley "DJ BJ" Whitaker – assistant engineering (tracks: 1, 5, 9–12), mixing (tracks: 2, 8), recording (tracks: 4–6, 9)
- David "Dos Dias" Bishop – assistant engineering (tracks: 2, 6, 8)
- Mac Attkisson – recording (track 2)
- Alverne Emmanuel – mixing (tracks: 3–6, 10, 11), recording (tracks: 10, 11)
- Daniel "DSims" Simmons – mixing and recording (track 7)
- Joe LaPorta – mastering

== Charts ==
Chart (2019)	Peak position
US Billboard 200	63
US Top R&B/Hip-Hop Albums (Billboard)	35
