= Ruffs (mixtape) =

Mixtape by Kenny Mason
- Released: September 28, 2022
- Genre: Hip hop
- Length: 46:00
- Label: RCA
- Producer: Kenny Mason; 1Mind; Ben10k; COUPE; Danes Blood; DavidTheTragic; DEVIN MALEK; James Kang; Julian Cruz; Rio Leyva; SKUFL; Zach Fogarty

Kenny Mason chronology
PUP PACK EP (2022)	Ruffs (2022)	3 (2023)

Singles from Ruffs
- 1. "Halloween" Released: August 17, 2022; 2. "Dip!" Released: August 17, 2022

Professional ratings
Review scores
Source	Rating
Pitchfork	7.6/10
The Lantern	4/5
WRBB	3/5 stars

Ruffs (stylized in all caps) is the debut mixtape by American rapper Kenny Mason. It was released on September 28, 2022 through RCA Records.

== Track listing ==
No.	Title	Producer(s)	Length
1.	"Zoomies"	Mason	1:57
2.	"Halos"	Mason	2:11
3.	"Halloween"	SKUFL, Julian Cruz	2:09
4.	"Dip!" (featuring DavidTheTragic)	Mason	2:23
5.	"Minute Forever"	Mason, DvDx	2:47
6.	"Double Up"	Angel White, Julian Cruz	3:16
7.	"Rx" (featuring Amindi)	Mason, Julian Cruz, SKUFL, DvDx	2:32
8.	"Spin N Flip" (featuring Young Nudy)	Mason, Julian Cruz	3:01
9.	"Mama Don’t Know"	Mason, Julian Cruz, DvDx	3:12
10.	"Nosedive" (featuring Jean Dawson)	Mason, Julian Cruz	3:24
11.	"333 / Atom"	Mason, Julian Cruz	4:22
12.	"Boa"	Mason	3:32
13.	"Givenchy Bag"	Mason, Julian Cruz	2:37
14.	"Black Heart"	Julien Earle	2:38
15.	"Shell"	Julien Earle	3:30
16.	"Westside"	Julien Earle	2:55
Total length:			46:00
