= Angelic Hoodrat =

Studio album by Kenny Mason
- Released: April 15, 2020
- Genres: Southern hip hop; boom bap; alt rock
- Length: 42:00
- Label: RCA
- Producers: Kenny Mason; Angel White; DvDx; SKFUL; Julian Cruz; Julien Earle

Kenny Mason chronology
November ‘19 (2019)	Angelic Hoodrat (2020)	Angelic Hoodrat: Supercut (2021)

Singles from Angelic Hoodrat
- 1. "Hit" Released: August 18, 2019; 2. "Angelic Hoodrat" Released: December 17, 2019; 3. "Metal Wings" Released: February 26, 2020

Angelic Hoodrat is the debut studio album by American rapper Kenny Mason. It was released on April 15, 2020 through RCA Records. Production was primarily handled by Mason alongside Angel White, DvDx, SKFUL, Julian Cruz and Julien Earle.

A year later, on April 16, the sequel to the album, titled Angelic Hoodrat: Supercut was released.

== Singles ==
On August 18, 2019, Mason released the single "Hit". The second single, "Angelic Hoodrat", was released on December 17, 2019. On February 26, 2020, the album's third single, "Metal Wings", was released.

== Critical reception ==
Professional ratings
Review scores
Source	Rating
Stereovision	8.5/10
Exclaim!	7/10

Angelic Hoodrat was met with very positive reviews. Josiah Nelson of Exclaim! described the album as a "testament to experimentation, shifting between a gritty, boom-bap smart southern sound with 808s and cinematic bass, and a grungy, melodic alt-rock sound."

=== Accolades ===
Publication	List	Rank	Ref.
Complex	The Best Albums of 2020	22	
ImAtlanta	The Top 20 Local Records of 2020	1	

== Track listing ==
No.	Title	Producer(s)	Length
1.	"Firestarter"	Kenny Mason	2:37
2.	"Angelic Hoodrat"	Mason	2:53
3.	"PTSD"	SKUFL; Julian Cruz	2:06
4.	"Lean"	Mason	2:45
5.	"Chevron"	Mason; DvDx	2:52
6.	"Handles"	Angel White; Cruz	1:41
7.	"Metal Wings"	Mason; Cruz; SKUFL; DvDx	2:43
8.	"30"	Mason; Cruz	4:04
9.	"Pretty Thoughts"	Mason; Cruz; DvDx	4:22
10.	"Anti-Gravity"	Mason; Cruz	2:33
11.	"Angels Calling // My Dad"	Mason; Cruz	4:13
12.	"Once Again"	Mason	2:52
13.	"U in a Gang // Exxon"	Mason; Cruz	4:15
14.	"Hit"	Julien Earle	2:39
Total length:			42:00
