= Kenny Mason =

American rapper (born 1994)

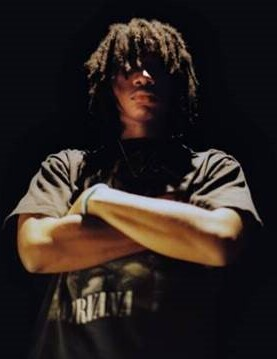
- Mason in 2021

Background information
- Also known as: Pup; The Angelic Grinch of Dill; Superpuppyboy; Ken; KJ
- Born: Edwin Kenneth Green Jr. December 17, 1994 (age 31); Atlanta, Georgia, U.S.
- Genres: Southern hip-hop; trap; punk rap; rap rock
- Occupations: Rapper; singer; songwriter; record producer
- Years active: 2014–present
- Labels: Atlantic (current); RCA (former)
- Website: kennymason.dog angelichoodrat.com

Edwin Kenneth Green Jr. (born December 17, 1994), professionally known as Kenny Mason, is an American rapper, singer, songwriter, and record producer, known for his distinctive sound which consists of a fusion between grunge, hip-hop, and elements of shoegaze.

Kenny Mason began gaining recognition in 2019 with the release of his breakout single "Hit". He built on that momentum with his 2020 debut album, Angelic Hoodrat, which earned praise from both fans and peers for its raw, distinctive sound. In 2021, he expanded the project with Angelic Hoodrat: Supercut, a reimagined sequel featuring appearances from Denzel Curry and Freddie Gibbs. Beyond his solo releases, Kenny has been featured on significant singles such as "Dance Now" with JID, which is certified Gold, and "Stick" alongside J. Cole, which has surpassed 75 million streams on Spotify. Mason's subsequent releases included the mixtape Ruffs, which included collaborations with Young Nudy and Jean Dawson, and the 2024 project Angel Eyes. Kenny has also released the EP 9 and notable singles such as "Slip" with Toro y Moi and "Easy Dub" with BabyDrill.

== Early life ==
Kenny Mason's upbringing plays a central role in both his story and his sound. Raised in Atlanta, he has spoken openly about growing up in a rough area and being exposed to violence at a young age. In interviews, he has reflected on how those experiences shaped his perspective early on. A pivotal moment came when he was 10 years old and lost his grandmother, a devastating event he discussed in Rolling Stone, which disrupted his sense of stability at a formative age and deeply impacted his understanding of home and security.

Years later, in 2014, he survived being shot, an experience he described in an interview with Clash as life-altering. He has shared that having his mother by his side in the ambulance forced him to confront who he was and ultimately accept himself, a turning point that continues to echo through his music.

Amid that uncertainty, music became both refuge and release. Kenny began rapping in 2007 at age 12, and around the same time discovered bands like Title Fight, My Chemical Romance, the Smashing Pumpkins, My Bloody Valentine, and Deftones through video games. He later told Rolling Stone that he draws inspiration from “the heaviness of their guitars and their melodies,” a blend of aggression and emotion that would become foundational to his musical identity. Today, he works closely with Shane and Ben from Title Fight, collaborating on records that continue to shape his evolving sound.

By 19, after a brief stint working at Krispy Kreme and later Best Buy, Kenny realized neither job was his path and fully committed to pursuing music as a career.

== Musical career ==
In 2014, Kenny Mason formed the collective House 9 with friends, releasing the mixtapes TvDinner, The Super Tape, and The Big 9 Theory on SoundCloud between 2014 and 2016. He later described that era as a period of creative self-education: "That was me trying to teach myself how to make beats for me and my homeboys, and figure out how to work Auto-Tune, how to record and make art at the same time. It’s the definition of experimental". The House 9 years laid the groundwork for his hands-on approach and evolving sound.

Between 2016 and 2018, Mason began building momentum with singles like 22 and 4Real, followed by Nike 2 and 2019's G.O.A.T, which was featured in the first episode of Euphoria. His breakout arrived later that year with Hit, which amassed millions of streams. In April 2020, he released his debut album Angelic Hoodrat, an experimental fusion of melodic alternative rock, trap, and R&B. That same year, he appeared on Cereal alongside IDK and JID, and introduced the capsule [ruffs], which included a feature from Denzel Curry.

He continued expanding his catalog with the mixtape Ruffs in 2022, the EP 6 in 2023, followed by Highway 9 later that year. In March 2024, Mason released his second studio album, 9. In May 2026, Kenny Mason released an album titled Bulldawg. This album included features from JID, SMJ, Dominic Fike, and Paris Texas.

== Discography ==
Studio albums

- Angelic Hoodrat (2020)
- Angelic Hoodrat: Supercut (2021)
- 9 (2024)
- Angel Eyes (2024)
- Bulldawg (2026)

== Tours ==
Headlining

- Ruffs Tour (2022)
- Route 9 Tour (2024)
- American Bulldawg Tour (2026)

Supporting

- Melt My Eyez Tour (Denzel Curry) (2022)
- Scaring the Hoes Tour (Danny Brown & JPEGMafia) (2023)
- Mischievous Tour (Denzel Curry) (2025)
