= Ambar Lucid =

American singer (born 2001)

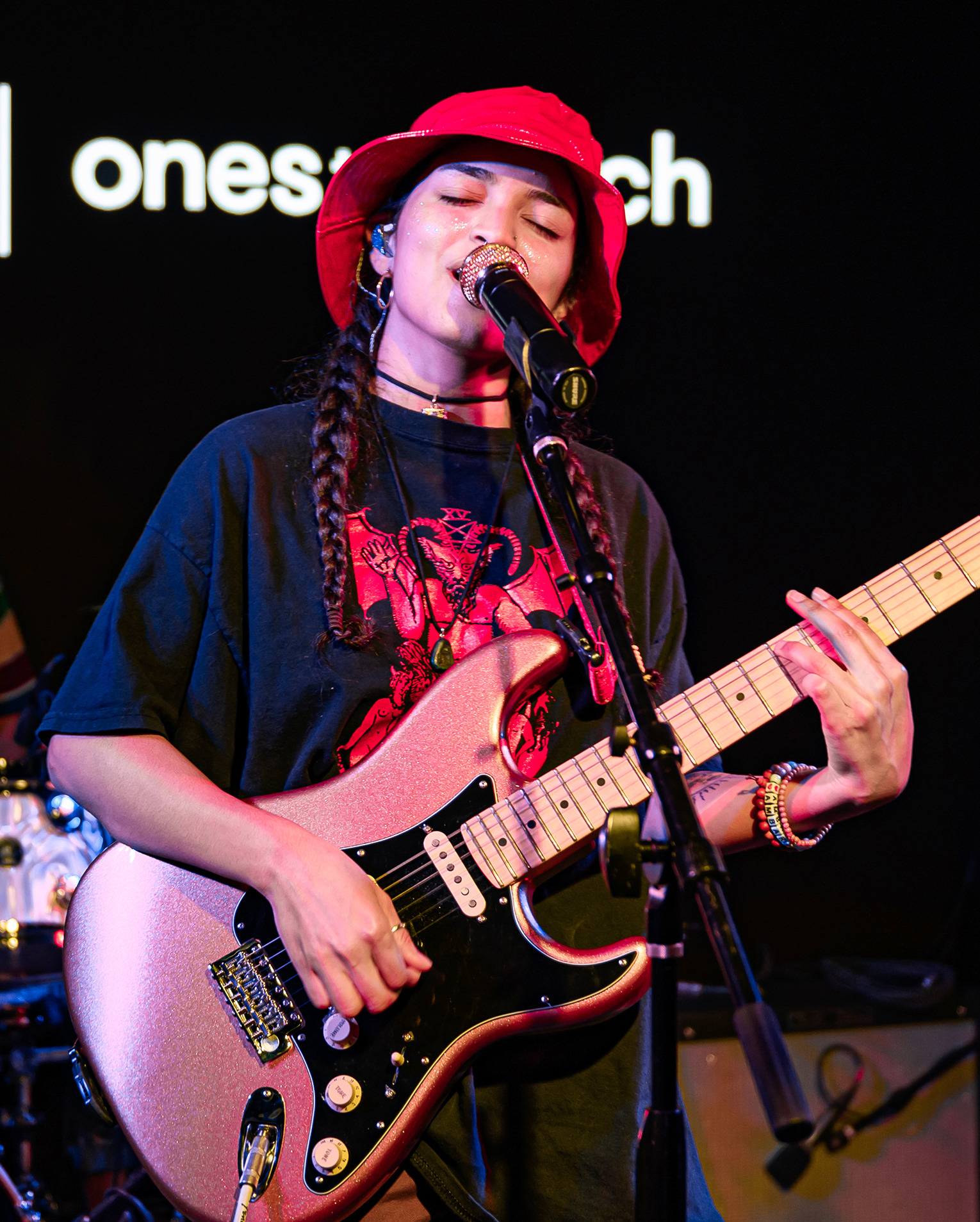
- Ambar Lucid, at Live Nation 2019

Background information
- Also known as: Ambar Lucid, "Estrella"
- Born: Ambar Carolina Crúz Rodriguez; January 2, 2001 (age 25)
- Origin: Little Ferry, New Jersey, U.S.
- Genres: Pop; R&B; Alternative; Indie
- Occupations: Singer; songwriter
- Instruments: Vocals; guitar; piano; ukulele
- Years active: 2017–present
- Label: Nice Life Recording Company
- Website: http://www.ambarlucid.com/

Ambar Carolina Crúz Rodriguez (born January 2, 2001), known professionally as Ambar Lucid, or Estrella, is an American singer-songwriter from the suburb of Little Ferry, New Jersey.

== Life and career ==
Crúz was born to a Dominican mother and Mexican father. She spent two years, between ages 5 and 7, moving between the Dominican Republic and New Jersey until finally settling in New Jersey. As a child, her father was deported to Mexico, and she did not see him again until they were reunited in 2019 when she was 18 years old. She also met her little sister for the first time. The documentary Llegaron Las Flores was created to capture the experience of separation and reuniting with family. She remains an advocate for immigrant rights, having also performed at the "Selena For Sanctuary" concert in 2019 in New York, which raised money for immigrant advocacy groups. The documentary was released the same week more ICE raids were announced in multiple large cities.

She started singing at the age of 5, and started by posting song covers on YouTube. She is completely self-taught on the piano, guitar, and ukulele and used YouTube videos as guidance for vocal technique. She dropped out of high school before her senior year to move to Los Angeles and pursue music. She released her debut album Garden of Lucid in 2020 and an EP, Dreaming Lucid, in 2019. In 2019, Crúz announced she was going on tour with Omar Apollo.

In 2024, Crúz signed a record deal with Nice Life Recording Company. She began releasing music with Nice Life Recording Company in 2025, starting with the song "There Goes My Baby" in March, and "6am" in April. Both songs will be featured on her May 2025 EP release, El Jardín de Lágrimas.

Beginning in April 2026, Crúz will co-headline the Entre Dos Mundos tour with singer Maye.

== Artistry ==
Crúz sings in both Spanish and English. She has stated "If one day I decided, 'Listen, I'ma sing all in Spanish,' it would be fine. If I write songs that don't have any Spanish in them, it would be fine. It feels really good to prove the person that said ['no one's gonna pay attention to your music if you sing in Spanish'] wrong, just because it was such a hurtful thing to hear as a child with such a big dream."

Crúz has cited Alice Phoebe Lou, Willow Smith, and Kali Uchis as inspirations for her songwriting, and notes peers Omar Apollo and Cuco as the new generation of young Latino artists whose music speaks to immigrant kids.

== Discography ==
=== Albums ===
- Garden of Lucid (2020)

=== EPs ===
- El Jardín de Lágrimas (2025)
- Get Lost In The Music (2021)
- Dreaming Lucid (2019)

=== Singles ===
- "6am" (2025)
- "There Goes My Baby" (2025)
- "Timeless" (2022)
- "Timeless - A COLORS SHOW" (2022)
- "La Torre" (2022)
- "girl ur so pretty" (2022)
- "Dead Leaves" (2022)
- "Lizard (Alternate Version) - Spotify Singles" (2021)
- "Ambar Bossa Nova - Spotify Singles" (2021)
- "Get Lost In The Music" (2021)
- "Lolita" (2020)
- "Head Down" (2020)
- "Garden (Sir Sly Remix)" (2020)
- "Questioning My Mind (Joey Pecoraro Remix)" (2020)
- "Fantasmas (Felly Remix)" (2020)
- "Universe (IHF Remix)" (2020)
- "A Letter to My Younger Self (Sarcastic Sounds Remix)" (2020)
- "Story to Tell" (2020)
- "Fantasmas" (2020)
- "Garden" (2019)
- "Questioning My Mind" (2019)
- "Mar de Llanto" (2019)
- "Candy" (2018)
- "Listen" (2018)
- "Eyes" (2018)
- "A letter to my younger self" (2018)
