= Don Cannon production discography =

The following is a discography of production by Don Cannon.

== Production credits ==
List of songs as producer or co-producer, with performing artists and other credited producers, showing year released and album name
Title	Year	Performing artist(s)	Other producer(s)	Album
"Go Crazy feat. Jay-Z"	2005	Young Jeezy, Jay-Z	none	Let's Get It: Thug Motivation 101
"Mr. 17.5"	2006	Young Jeezy	none	The Inspiration
"Can't Get Enough feat. Mase"	2006	Claudette Ortiz, Mase	none	Can't Get Enough
"Get Right feat. Yo Gotti"	2006	Lil Scrappy, Yo Gotti	none	Bred 2 Die Born 2 Live
"It Is What It Is"	2006	Cassidy, Swizz Beatz	Swizz Beatz	The Best of the Hustla
"Chunk Up The Deuce"	2006	Lil Keke, Paul Wall, UGK	none	The Chronicles
"Cannon Remix"	2007	Lil Wayne, Freeway, T.I, Drama, Willie the Kid	none	Gangsta Grillz: The Album
"The Art of Storytellin' Part 4"	2007	Outkast, Marsha Ambrosius	none	Gangsta Grillz: The Album
"No More"	2007	T.I, Lloyd	Detroit Red	Gangsta Grillz: The Album
"Throw Ya Sets Up"	2007	Yung Joc, Jadakiss, Willie the Kid	none	Gangsta Grillz: The Album
"Walk Wit Me"	2007	Freeway, Busta Rhymes, Jadakiss	none	Free At Last
"Jokes On You feat. Pusha T"	2007	Fabolous, Pusha T	none	From Nothin' to Somethin'
"Man Down"	2007	50 Cent	none	Curtis
"Let It Go feat. Mavado"	2008	G-Unit, Mavado	none	T.O.S.: Terminate on Sight
"Circulate"	2008	Young Jeezy	none	The Recession
"Undisputed feat. Floyd Mayweather"	2008	Ludacris	none	Theater of the Mind
"Everybody Hates Chris feat. Chris Rock"	2008	Ludacris, Chris Rock	none	Theater of the Mind
"Light Up a Fire"	2008	Busta Rhymes	none	Back On My BS
"Dope Boys (Remix)"	2009	Lupe Fiasco	none	Certified Worldwide
"La Di Da"	2009	Asher Roth	none	Asleep in the Bread Aisle
"On & On "	2010	Macy Gray	Hit-Boy	The Sellout
"Out The Ghetto"	2010	Sheek Louch	none	Donnie G: Don Gorilla
"All The Way Gone feat. Mario, Wale, "	2011	The Game, Wale, Mario	Mars Of 1500 or Nothin'	The R.E.D. Album
"Test Drive, "	2011	T-Pain,	Mars Of 1500 or Nothin'	Revolver
"This Thing Of Ours feat. Nas "	2012	Maybach Music Group, Nas	none	Self Made 2
"I Feel Good "	2012	2 Chainz	none	Based on a T.R.U. Story
"Break My My feat. Rick Ross"	2012	Estelle, Rick Ross	none	All Of Me
"Numbers On the Board"	2013	Pusha T	Kanye West, 88-Keys	MNIMN
"Nasty"	2013	Logic	none	Welcome To Forever

== 2005 ==
=== Young Jeezy - Let's Get It: Thug Motivation 101 ===
- 6. "Go Crazy" (featuring Jay-Z)

== 2006 ==
=== Young Jeezy - The Inspiration ===
- 14. "Mr. 17.5"

=== Claudette Ortiz - Non-album release ===
- 00. "Can't Get Enough" (featuring Mase)

=== Lil Scrappy - Bred 2 Die Born 2 Live ===
- 12. "Get Right" (featuring Yo Gotti)

=== Cassidy - Best Of The Hustla ===
- 00. "It Is What It Is" (Produced with Swizz Beatz)

== 2007 ==
=== DJ Drama - Gangsta Grillz: The Album ===
- 5. "Cannon Remix" (featuring Lil Wayne, Freeway, T.I, and Willie The Kid)
- 8. "The Art of Storytellin' Part 4" (featuring Outkast, and Marsha Ambrosius)
- 14. "No More" (featuring T.I, and Lloyd)
- 16. "Throw Ya Sets Up" (featuring Yung Joc, Jadakiss, and Willie The Kid)

=== Freeway - Free At Last ===
- 12. "Walk Wit Me" (featuring Busta Rhymes, and Jadakiss)

=== Fabolous - From Nothin' to Somethin' ===
- 13. "Joke's On You" (featuring Pusha T)

=== 50 Cent - Curtis ===
- 3. "Man Down"

== 2008 ==
=== G-Unit - T.O.S.: Terminate on Sight ===
- 12. "Let It Go" (featuring Mavado)

=== Young Jeezy - The Recession ===
- 10. "Circulate"

=== Ludacris - Theater of the Mind ===
- 2. "Undisputed" (featuring Floyd Mayweather Jr.)
- 7. "Everybody Hates Chris" (featuring Chris Rock)

=== Dj Greg Street - Certified Worldwide ===
- 00. "Dope Boys (Remix)" (featuring Lupe Fiasco, Wale and Kardinall Official)

=== Asher Roth - Asleep in the Bread Aisle ===
- 4. "La Di Da"

== 2010 ==
=== Macy Gray - The Sellout ===
- 11. "On & On" (Produced with Hit-Boy)

=== Sheek Louch - Donnie G: Don Gorilla ===
- 4. "Out The Ghetto"

=== CJ Hilton - Non-album release ===
- 00. "We Can Get It In" (Produced with Mars Of 1500 or Nothin')

== 2011 ==
=== The Game - The R.E.D. Album ===
- 14. "All The Way Gone" (featuring Wale and Mario) (Produced with Mars Of 1500 or Nothin')

=== Estelle - All Of Me ===
- 7. "Break My Heart" (featuring Rick Ross) (Produced with Mars Of 1500 or Nothin')

== 2012 ==
=== Maybach Music Group - Self Made 2 ===
- 3. "This Thing Of Ours" (featuring Nas)

=== 2 Chainz - Based on a T.R.U. Story ===
- 16. "I Feel Good"

== 2013 ==
=== Pusha T - My Name Is My Name ===
- 2. "Numbers On the Board" (Produced with Kanye West, and 88-Keys)

=== Logic - Young Sinatra: Welcome to Forever ===
- 11. "Nasty"

== 2014 ==
=== Young Jeezy - Seen It All ===
- 5. "Holy Ghost" (Produced with Lyle Leduff)

== 2015 ==
=== Lil Uzi Vert - Luv Is Rage ===
- 1. "Safe House" (Produced with Maaly Raw)
- 7. "Top"
- 12. "Paradise"

=== WE55 - The Black Prince Charles ===
- 10. "Crazy"

== 2016 ==
=== Lil Uzi Vert - Lil Uzi Vert Vs. The World ===
- 3. "Money Longer" (Produced with Maaly Raw)
- 4. "Grab The Wheel"
- 7. "Ps And Qs"
- 8. "Team Rocket" (Produced with Lyle Leduff)

=== Lil Uzi Vert - The Perfect LUV Tape ===
- 1. "Do What I Want" (Produced with Maaly Raw)
- 7. "You're Lost" (Produced with Slade Da Monsta)
- 8. "Erase Your Social" (Produced with Lyle Leduff)
- 10. "Seven Million" (Produced with Nard & B)

=== Mod Sun - Non-album release ===
- 00. "Smoking' What I'm Smokin' On" (featuring Rich the Kid and D.R.A.M)

=== Lyquin - The Other Side ===
- 2. "Confianza"

== 2017 ==
=== Nick Grant - Return of the Cool ===
- 4. "All of You" (featuring B. Hess)
- 9. "Get Down (Poonana)"

=== Wale - Shine ===
- 6. "Colombia Heights (Te Llamo)" featuring J Balvin

=== DJ Drama - Shine ===
- 2. "Big Money (C4 Remix)" featuring Rich Homie Quan, Lil Uzi Vert and Skeme (Produced with C4)
- 4. "Audible" featuring WDNG Crshrs

=== Mod Sun - Movie ===
- 7. "WWYGADT"
- 8. "Smokin' What I'm Smokin' On" featuring DRAM and Rich the Kid

=== Lil Uzi Vert - Luv Is Rage 2 ===
- 1. "Two®" (Produced with Lil Uzi Vert and LeDuff)
- 3. "Sauce It Up" (Produced with Michael Piroli and BeldonDidThat)
- 4. "No Sleep Leak" (Produced with Cubeatz)
- 5. "The Way Life Goes" featuring Oh Wonder (Produced with Ike Beatz)
- 10. "UnFazed" featuring The Weeknd (Produced with DaHeala, The Weeknd, and Maaly Raw)
- 11. "Pretty Mami" (Produced with Illmind)

=== Lil Uzi Vert - Non-album release ===
- 00. "The Way Life Goes Remix" featuring Oh Wonder, and Nicki Minaj (Produced with Ike Beatz)

== 2018 ==
=== Problem - S2 ===
- 15. "Multiply" (featuring Mozzy and YBN Cordae) (Produced with JB minor and Cypress Merona)

=== Meek Mill - Championships ===
- 2. "Trauma"

=== Future and Juice Wrld - Wrld on Drugs ===
- 12. "WRLD On Drugs" (Produced with Oogie Mane and B Hunna)

=== Offset - Father of 4 ===
- 12. "After Dark" (Produced with Metro Boomin, Allen Ritter and Dre Moon)

=== G Herbo - Humble Beast ===
- 2. "Black" (Produced with Maaly Raw and DP Beats)
- 3. "Bi Polar" (Produced with Watson The Great)

=== Killumantii - Yellow Tape ===
- 2. "Kill Em" (Produced with Oz Betaz)
- 5. "Envious" (featuring Juicy J)(Produced with Kill Beats)

=== Playboi Carti - Die Lit ===
- 15. "No time" (featuring Gunna)

== 2019 ==
=== The Game - Born 2 Rap ===
- 10. "Gucci Flip Flops" (Produced with Swizz Beatz)

=== Jack Harlow - Confetti ===
- 3. "Ice" (Produced with 2Fowoyne)
- 7. "Goin Back Down" (Produced with 2Fowoyne)

=== Young Dolph - Role Model ===
- 8. "On God" (Produced with Rickie Lamar Thomas)

=== Seddy Hendrinx - Roots II ===
- 8. "Low Key"

== 2020 ==
=== Lil Uzi Vert - Lil Uzi Vert vs. the World 2 ===
- 2. "Lotus" (Produced with Oogie Mane and Treshaun Beats)

=== Tory Lanez - The New Toronto 3 ===
- 5. "Dope Boy Diary" (Produced with Oogie Mane and Sean Momberger)

=== G Herbo - PTSD ===
- 1. "Intro" (Produced with Dopson)
- 5. "Party In Heaven"(featuring Lil Durk) (Produced with Lyle LeDuff and Sean Momberger)

=== G Herbo - PTSD Deluxe Edition ===
- 5. "In A Minute" (Produced with Sean Momberger)
- 11. "Trenches" (Produced with Sean Momberger)

=== Seddy Hendrinx - B.H.D. (Black Hearted Demon) ===
- 1. "Emotional Pt 2"
- 3. "Hands Down"

=== Black Soprano Family - Benny the Butcher & DJ Drama Present: The Respected Sopranos ===
- 8. "Its Over" featuring Benny the Butcher, Heems & Rick Hyde

=== Wiz Khalifa - The Saga of Wiz Khalifa (Deluxe) ===
- 3. "On Top"
- 5. "This Time Around"

=== Rapsody - Non-album release ===
- 00. "12 Problems"

=== Jeezy - The Recession 2 ===
- 2. "Here We Go" (Produced with Sean Momberger)
- 3. "Modern Day"
- 4. "Back" (Produced with Cubeatz)

=== Symba - Don't Run From R.A.P. ===
- 11. "Westside Story"

=== 24hrs and DJ Drama - 12 AM in Atlanta 2 ===
- 9. "Love Atlanta" featuring Nessly

== 2021 ==
=== Fedd The God - Non-album release ===
- 00. "42"

=== Conway The Machine - La Maquina ===
- 4. "Clarity"
- 9. "Scatter Brain" featuring Ludacris and JID

=== Big Sean - What You Expect ===
- 4. "Loyal To A Fault" featuring Bryson Tiller and Lil Durk

=== Childish Major - Thank You, God. For it all. ===
- 4. "Down South"

=== G Herbo - 25 ===
- 8. "Whole Hearts"

=== Rick Ross - Richer Than I Ever Been ===
- 6. "Wiggle"

== 2022 ==
=== Lecrae - Church Clothes 4 ===
- 12. "Journey"
