= 20 minutes =

20 minutes may refer to:

- 20 minutes (France), a newspaper
- 20 minutes (Switzerland), a French-language newspaper

20 Minutes refers to:

- A 2023 film inspired by the 2018 Hawaii false missile alert

== See also ==
- 20 Dakika (transl. "20 Minutes"), a 2013 Turkish television series
- 20 Minuten, a Swiss German-language newspaper
- 20 minutos, a Spanish newspaper
- 20 Min, a song by American Rapper Lil Uzi Vert
