= Luv Is Rage 2 =

Studio album by Lil Uzi Vert
- Released: August 25, 2017
- Studios: Abel's Crib (Toronto); Chalice (Los Angeles); Conway (Los Angeles); Germano (New York City); Means Street (Atlanta); NightBird (West Hollywood)
- Genre: Emo rap
- Length: 56:13
- Labels: Generation Now; Atlantic
- Producers: Bobby Kritical; Cubeatz; D. Rich; DaHeala; DJ Plugg; Don Cannon; Honorable C.N.O.T.E.; Ike Beatz; Illmind; JW Lucas; Lil Uzi Vert; Lyle LeDuff; Maaly Raw; Metro Boomin; Pharrell Williams; Pi'erre Bourne; Rex Kudo; TM88; The Weeknd; WondaGurl

Lil Uzi Vert chronology
Luv Is Rage 1.5 (2017)	Luv Is Rage 2 (2017)	Eternal Atake (2020)

Singles from Luv Is Rage 2
- 1. "XO Tour Llif3" Released: March 24, 2017; 2. "The Way Life Goes" Released: October 3, 2017; 3. "Sauce It Up" Released: February 27, 2018

Luv Is Rage 2 is the debut studio album by the American rapper and singer Lil Uzi Vert, released on August 25, 2017, through Generation Now and Atlantic Records. The album's production was handled by various producers, including Lil Uzi Vert themself, Don Cannon, Honorable C.N.O.T.E., Maaly Raw, Pharrell Williams, Pi'erre Bourne and TM88, and features guest appearances from the Weeknd, Oh Wonder, and Pharrell Williams. An emo rap album, Luv Is Rage 2 is characterized by its vibrant, emotionally charged soundscape, blending Auto-Tune-heavy vocals, melodic hooks, and high-energy beats with themes of heartbreak, hedonism, and nihilistic bravado. Serving as a successor to Uzi's third extended play, Luv Is Rage 1.5 (2017), and debut commercial mixtape, Luv Is Rage (2015). A deluxe edition, featuring four bonus tracks, was released on November 17, 2017, followed by a Japan-exclusive edition with two additional tracks.

The album was supported by three singles, "XO Tour Llif3", "The Way Life Goes", and "Sauce It Up". Luv Is Rage 2 received generally positive reviews from critics, debuting at number one on the US Billboard 200 with 135,000 album-equivalent units, of which 28,000 were pure album sales. On December 10, 2024, the album was certified five-times platinum by the Recording Industry Association of America (RIAA) for combined sales, streaming, and track-sale equivalents of 5,000,000 units.

== Background ==
In November 2016, after the release of 1017 vs. the World, a collaborative extended play with American rapper Gucci Mane, Lil Uzi Vert initially announced Luv Is Rage 2, that would suffer from numerous delays amid confusion. In February 2017, Lil Uzi released an extended play, Luv Is Rage 1.5 containing four tracks for streaming on SoundCloud. It serves as a prequel for Luv Is Rage 2; as well as Uzi previewing snippets of those songs online throughout the whole year. In July 2017, DJ Drama and Don Cannon premiered five songs on their Shade 45 radio show, which were not to be included on the album. On August 24, 2017, Lil Uzi unexpectedly announced the release of Luv Is Rage 2 a day before release via social media, including the cover art and track listing.

== Composition ==
Luv Is Rage 2 is an emo rap album. The album's 16 tracks (expanded to 20 in the deluxe edition) showcase a blend of melodic hooks, Auto-Tune-saturated vocals, and high-energy beats, reflecting Uzi's exploration of heartbreak, hedonism, and post-breakup bravado. Its production, helmed by a roster including Don Cannon, TM88, Metro Boomin, WondaGurl, and Pharrell Williams, features booming trap drums, ethereal synths, and understated piano, creating a cohesive yet diverse sound.

The opener, "Two®", establishes a bold tone with accordion-driven production and Uzi's sing-rap style, though its vocoder-heavy, half-spoken delivery polarizes listeners. "444+222" employs repetitive, chant-like structures, emphasizing atmosphere over lyrical complexity, which some critics found draining. The album's emotional peak, "XO Tour Llif3", a haunting emo rap anthem with a creeping beat inspired by The Nightmare Before Christmas and melodies echoing Young Thug and Linkin Park, its iconic "All my friends are dead" refrain capturing 2017's nihilistic zeitgeist. "The Way Life Goes", interpolating Oh Wonder's "Landslide", juxtaposes tender pop melodies with raw heartbreak, delivering accessible emotional depth.

Uzi's vocals are a focal point, oscillating between animated yelps, rapid-fire rap, and emotive singing, often enhanced by Auto-Tune to heighten the album's raw intensity. "Neon Guts", featuring Pharrell Williams, highlights Uzi's smooth delivery and vivid imagery over vibraphone chimes, creating a lush, standout track. "X", produced by Metro Boomin and Pi'erre Bourne, channels prideful defiance through pulsating trap beats, masking underlying insecurities. "Sauce It Up" and "Pretty Mami" offer infectious, club-ready hooks, with the former echoing "XO Tour Llif3"'s catchy appeal.

The album's introspective side surfaces in "Dark Queen", a supernatural tribute to Uzi's mother, and "Feelings Mutual", where WondaGurl's guitar-heavy production amplifies Uzi's anguished delivery. "Early 20 Rager" brings brash energy, while "For Real" captivates with its hypnotic beat and memorable chorus. Conversely, "UnFazed", featuring the Weeknd, feels disjointed, with Abel's reserved performance clashing with Uzi's vulnerability, possibly a strategic inclusion for streaming appeal.

Lyrically, Uzi favors vibe-driven, quotable lines over narrative depth, touching on heartbreak, wealth, and toxic masculinity. However, some tracks slip into repetitive flexing or problematic tropes, especially toward the album's end. The album's loose, chaotic structure—marked by abrupt tonal shifts and unconventional song formats—reflects Uzi's restless psyche but can challenge listener engagement, with critics noting its length tests attention spans.

== Release and promotion ==
Lil Uzi Vert began teasing Luv Is Rage 2 in late 2016, following the success of their 2016 mixtapes Lil Uzi Vert vs. the World and The Perfect LUV Tape. On December 13, 2016, Uzi announced the album via Twitter, though no release date was specified. In February 2017, Uzi released the precursor extended play Luv Is Rage 1.5 on SoundCloud, featuring four tracks, including "XO Tour Llif3", which generated significant online buzz. In July 2017, DJ Drama and Don Cannon premiered five unreleased tracks on their Gangsta Grillz show on SiriusXM. On August 24, 2017, Uzi unexpectedly announced the album's release via social media, sharing the cover art and tracklist, and dropped Luv Is Rage 2 the next day, August 25, 2017, for streaming and digital download through Generation Now and Atlantic Records.

On November 17, 2017, a deluxe edition was released, adding four bonus tracks: "Skir Skirr", "Loaded", "Diamonds All on My Wrist", and "20 Min", with Urban Outfitters offering an exclusive cassette version. The album was released a few days later in Japan, with two additional tracks: "Money Longer" and "Do What I Want", both originally featured on Lil Uzi Vert vs. the World and The Perfect LUV Tape, respectively. The album's promotion leaned heavily on Uzi's social media engagement and live performances, with producer Maaly Raw describing in an XXL interview that the album was "about 90% finished" by early 2017, with extra tracks recorded to perfect the final product.

=== Singles ===
The lead single, "XO Tour Llif3", was released for free streaming on March 24, 2017, initially as part of Luv Is Rage 1.5. Produced by TM88 and JW Lucas, its emo-rap style and introspective lyrics about heartbreak and mental health resonated widely, peaking at number seven on the US Billboard Hot 100. A music video, directed by Virgil Abloh and released on September 4, 2017, featured dark, surreal visuals that amplified the song's emotional weight. "The Way Life Goes" was released as the second single to urban contemporary radio on October 3, 2017, with a remix featuring Trinidadian-American rapper Nicki Minaj dropping on November 3, 2017. "Sauce It Up" followed as the third single, sent to urban contemporary radio on February 27, 2018.

== Critical reception ==
Luv Is Rage 2 ratings
Aggregate scores
Source	Rating
Metacritic	75/100
Review scores
Source	Rating
AllMusic	3.5/5 stars
Consequence	B
HipHopDX	3.7/5
HotNewHipHop	77%
Pitchfork	7.7/10
RapReviews	6.5/10
Spectrum Culture	2.75/5 stars
Sputnikmusic	3.0/5
Tiny Mix Tapes	3.5/5
XXL	4/5

Luv Is Rage 2 was met with generally positive reviews. At Metacritic, which assigns a normalized rating out of 100 to reviews from professional publications, the album received an average score of 75, based on eight reviews.

Scott Glaysher of XXL gave a positive review, stating "Despite the long-winded nature of the album, Uzi definitely got it right with Luv Is Rage 2. The songs are catchy, the beats are hot and Uzi gives a vocal performance that redefines the term rap rock star". Hip hop website HotNewHipHop stated that "Uzi is changed a person now, more weary of the world, less naively cheerful, and this is reflected on Luv Is Rage 2. If [they do] have a heart, it may soon be blackened. Uzi is feeling vindictive, rather than just being "happy to be here" (as [they were] on Luv Is Rage), [they're] looking, now, for admiration and acknowledgement that's deserved of [them]". Dan Weiss of Consequence said, "Nearly every song on Luv Is Rage 2 comes with a distinct enough hook to break up the limited set of things it does and subjects it ponders". In his review, Aaron McKrell of HipHopDX states, "Luv Is Rage 2 is proof that Lil Uzi Vert is simply an artist who succeeds in making music [they love], for people that hold tightly to [Uzi's] carpe-diem attitude". Corrigan B of Tiny Mix Tapes said, "The breadth of sounds covered will scan as inconsistency to all but the most pious Uzi devotees, but it's hard to imagine anything else serving as a more comprehensive document of rap in 2017".

Neil Z. Yeung of AllMusic said, "Although Uzi's post-breakup pain rears its head throughout the entirety of the album, many of the tracks are too fun to get too bogged down in emotions". Paul Thompson of Pitchfork stated that Luv Is Rage 2 is Lil Uzi Vert's "most musically developed work and features a bulk of [their] most interesting songs to date", as well as commending the subject matter and production, concluding: "Whether [they're] full of joy or howling into the void, [Uzi] pushes [their] songs to their edge, which helps to deliver on the promise shown in [Uzi's] earlier work. We knew Lil Uzi Vert would become one of rap's biggest stars, but Rage 2 suggests that [they] may spend [their] time on top experimenting rather than retreating to a comfort zone." Steve "Flash" Juon of RapReviews wrote: "As for today's singing rappers, Vert fits in comfortably next to the likes of Fetty Wap and French Montana, and I have little qualms with calling [Uzi] a better writer than the latter. The production is a little bit more of a mixed bag." In a mixed review, Sputnikmusic's Robert Lowe stated: "A lot of tracks start off OK, but [Uzi's] flow and style are so unfocused and muddled the songs become a chore to sit through."

=== Year-end lists ===
Select year-end rankings of Luv Is Rage 2
Publication	List	Rank	Ref.
Billboard	Billboard's 50 Best Albums of 2017	13	
Complex	The Best Albums of 2017	8	
Noisey	The 100 Best Albums of 2017	51	
NPR Music	The 50 Best Albums of 2017	22	
Rap-Up	Rap-Up's 20 Best Albums of 2017	8	

== Commercial performance ==
Luv Is Rage 2 debuted at number one on the US Billboard 200 with 135,000 album-equivalent units, of which 28,000 were pure album sales. In its second week on the chart, Luv Is Rage 2 moved another 73,000 units bringing the total sales to 208,000. On December 10, 2024, the album was certified five-times platinum by the Recording Industry Association of America (RIAA) for combined sales, streaming and track-sale equivalents of five million units.

The album also entered at number 14 on the UK Albums Chart, selling 3,000 album-equivalent units in its first week.

== Track listing ==
Luv Is Rage 2 track listing
No.	Title	Writer(s)	Producer(s)	Length
1.	"Two®"	Symere Woods; Donald Cannon; Lyle LeDuff	Lil Uzi Vert; Don Cannon; LeDuff	3:05
2.	"444+222"	Woods; Jamaal Henry; Ivison Smith	Maaly Raw; Ike Beatz	4:07
3.	"Sauce It Up"	Woods; Cannon	Don Cannon; Michael Piroli^{[b]}; BeldonDidThat^{[b]}	3:27
4.	"No Sleep Leak"	Woods; Cannon; Kevin Gomringer; Tim Gomringer	Don Cannon; Cubeatz	3:09
5.	"The Way Life Goes" (featuring Oh Wonder)	Woods; Josephine Vander West; Anthony Vander West; Cannon; Smith	Don Cannon; Ike Beatz	3:41
6.	"For Real"	Woods; Kenneth Smith; Bobby Turner, Jr.	DJ Plugg; Bobby Kritical	2:57
7.	"Feelings Mutual"	Woods; Ebony Oshunrinde; Francis Nguyen-Tran	WondaGurl; FrancisGotHeat^{[a]}	3:53
8.	"Neon Guts" (featuring Pharrell Williams)	Woods; Pharrell Williams	Williams	4:18
9.	"Early 20 Rager"	Woods; Henry	Maaly Raw	4:34
10.	"UnFazed" (featuring The Weeknd)	Woods; Abel Tesfaye; Jason Quenneville; Cannon; Henry	DaHeala; The Weeknd; Don Cannon; Maaly Raw	3:10
11.	"Pretty Mami"	Woods; Cannon; Ramon Ibanga, Jr.	Don Cannon; Illmind	4:24
12.	"How to Talk"	Woods; Oshunrinde	WondaGurl	3:21
13.	"X"	Woods; Leland Wayne; Jordan Jenks	Metro Boomin; Pi'erre Bourne	2:53
14.	"Malfunction"	Woods; Oshunrinde	WondaGurl	3:19
15.	"Dark Queen"	Woods; Henry; Masamune Kudo	Maaly Raw; Rex Kudo	2:53
16.	"XO Tour Llif3"	Woods; Bryan Simmons; John Lucas	TM88; JW Lucas	3:02
Total length:				56:13

Deluxe edition (bonus tracks)
No.	Title	Writer(s)	Producer(s)	Length
17.	"Skir Skirr"	Woods; Dwayne Richardson	D. Rich	3:01
18.	"Loaded"	Woods; Simmons; Larry Griffin, Jr.	TM88; S1^{[a]}	3:39
19.	"Diamonds All on My Wrist"	Woods; Turner, Jr.	Bobby Kritical	2:50
20.	"20 Min"	Woods; Carlton Mays, Jr.	Honorable C.N.O.T.E.	3:40
Total length:				69:23

Japanese edition (bonus tracks)
No.	Title	Writer(s)	Producer(s)	Length
21.	"Money Longer"	Woods; Cannon; Henry	Don Cannon; Maaly Raw	3:19
22.	"Do What I Want"	Woods; Cannon; Henry	Don Cannon; Maaly Raw	2:55

Notes

- ^{^[a]} signifies a co-producer
- ^{^[b]} signifies an uncredited co-producer
- "Two®" features additional vocals from Kesha Lee
- "The Way Life Goes" originally didn't credit featured vocals by Oh Wonder
- "How to Talk" features additional vocals from DreamDoll
- "XO Tour Llif3" is stylized as "XO TOUR Llif3"

Sample credits

- "The Way Life Goes" contains a sample of "Landslide", written by Josephine Vander West and Anthony Vander West, as performed by Oh Wonder.

== Personnel ==
Credits were adapted from the album's liner notes.

Performers

- Lil Uzi Vert – primary artist
- Oh Wonder – featured artist (track 5)
- Pharrell Williams – featured artist (track 8)
- The Weeknd – featured artist (track 10)

Technical

- Kesha Lee – mixing engineer (tracks 1, 2, 9, 12, 17–20), recording engineer (tracks 1–9, 11–20)
- Chris Athens – mastering engineer (tracks 1–15)
- Don Cannon – mixing engineer (tracks 2, 9, 15, 20)
- Leslie Braithwaite – mixing engineer (tracks 3, 4, 6, 8, 11, 16)
- Jaycen Joshua – mixing engineer (tracks 5, 7, 10, 13, 14)
- Michael Piroli – mixer (tracks 3, 5)
- Ben Sedano – engineer (track 8)
- Jon Sher – engineer (track 8)
- Thomas Cullison – engineer (track 8)
- Mike Larson – recording engineer (track 8)
- Colin Leonard – mastering engineer (track 16)

Production

- Lil Uzi Vert – producer (track 1)
- Don Cannon – producer (tracks 1, 3, 4, 5, 10, 11)
- Lyle LeDuff – producer (track 1)
- Maaly Raw – producer (tracks 2, 9, 10, 15)
- Ike Beatz – producer (tracks 2, 5)
- BeldonDidThat – uncredited co-producer (track 3)
- Michael Piroli – uncredited co-producer (track 3)
- Cubeatz – producer (track 4)
- DJ Plugg – producer (track 6)
- Bobby Kritical – producer (tracks 6, 19)
- WondaGurl – producer (tracks 7, 12, 14)
- FrancisGotHeat – co-producer (track 7)
- Pharrell Williams – producer (track 8)
- DaHeala – producer (track 10)
- The Weeknd – producer (track 10)
- Illmind – producer (track 11)
- Metro Boomin – producer (track 13)
- Pi'erre Bourne – producer (track 13)
- Rex Kudo – producer (track 15)
- TM88 – producer (tracks 16, 18)
- JW Lucas – producer (track 16)
- D. Rich – producer (track 17)
- S1 – co-producer (track 18)
- Honorable C.N.O.T.E. – producer (track 20)

Additional personnel

- Don Cannon – executive producer
- DJ Drama – executive producer, album producer
- Leighton "LakeShow" Morrison – executive producer
- Ron Cabiltes – sample clearance
- Spike Jordan – photographer, art direction and design
- Matt Meiners – art direction and design

== Charts ==
=== Weekly charts ===
Chart performance for Luv Is Rage 2
Chart (2017)	Peak position
Australian Albums (ARIA)	22
Belgian Albums (Ultratop Flanders)	27
Belgian Albums (Ultratop Wallonia)	88
Canadian Albums (Billboard)	3
Czech Albums (ČNS IFPI)	80
Danish Albums (Hitlisten)	12
Dutch Albums (Album Top 100)	13
Finnish Albums (Suomen virallinen lista)	8
French Albums (SNEP)	51
German Albums (Offizielle Top 100)	80
Italian Albums (FIMI)	27
Latvian Albums (LaIPA)	32
New Zealand Albums (RMNZ)	10
Norwegian Albums (VG-lista)	9
Slovak Albums (ČNS IFPI)	47
Swedish Albums (Sverigetopplistan)	15
Swiss Albums (Schweizer Hitparade)	91
UK Albums (Official Charts)	14
UK R&B Albums (Official Charts)	7
US Billboard 200	1
US Top R&B/Hip-Hop Albums (Billboard)	1

=== Year-end charts ===
2017 year-end chart performance for Luv Is Rage 2
Chart (2017)	Position
US Billboard 200	41
US Top R&B/Hip-Hop Albums (Billboard)	17

2018 year-end chart performance for Luv Is Rage 2
Chart (2018)	Position
Canadian Albums (Billboard)	32
Danish Albums (Hitlisten)	92
Icelandic Albums (Plötutíóindi)	89
US Billboard 200	16
US Top R&B/Hip-Hop Albums (Billboard)	12

2019 year-end chart performance for Luv Is Rage 2
Chart (2019)	Position
US Billboard 200	58
US Top R&B/Hip-Hop Albums (Billboard)	27

2020 year-end chart performance for Luv Is Rage 2
Chart (2020)	Position
US Billboard 200	74
US Top R&B/Hip-Hop Albums (Billboard)	41

2021 year-end chart performance for Luv Is Rage 2
Chart (2021)	Position
US Billboard 200	80
US Top R&B/Hip-Hop Albums (Billboard)	51

2022 year-end chart performance for Luv Is Rage 2
Chart (2022)	Position
US Billboard 200	74
US Top R&B/Hip-Hop Albums (Billboard)	38

2023 year-end chart performance for Luv Is Rage 2
Chart (2023)	Position
US Billboard 200	91
US Top R&B/Hip-Hop Albums (Billboard)	67

2024 year-end chart performance for Luv Is Rage 2
Chart (2024)	Position
US Billboard 200	132

=== Decade-end charts ===
Decade-end chart performance for Luv Is Rage 2
Chart (2010–2019)	Position
US Billboard 200	61

== Certifications ==
Certifications for Luv Is Rage 2
Region	Certification	Certified units/sales
Denmark (IFPI Danmark)	Platinum	20,000^{‡}
France (SNEP)	Gold	50,000^{‡}
Italy (FIMI)	Gold	25,000^{‡}
United Kingdom (BPI)	Gold	100,000^{‡}
United States (RIAA)	5× Platinum	5,000,000^{‡}
^{‡} Sales+streaming figures based on certification alone.

== Release history ==
Release dates and formats for Luv Is Rage 2
Region	Date	Label(s)	Format(s)	Edition	Ref.
Various	August 25, 2017	Generation Now; Atlantic	Digital download; streaming	Standard	
Various	November 17, 2017	Generation Now; Atlantic	CD; digital download; streaming	Deluxe	
Various	December 8, 2017	Generation Now; Atlantic	Cassette	Deluxe	
Japan	December 20, 2017	Warner Music Japan	CD	Japan	
Various	January 12, 2018	Generation Now; Atlantic	Vinyl	Deluxe	

== See also ==
- List of Billboard 200 number-one albums of 2017
