= Do What I Want =

2016 song by Lil Uzi Vert

Song by Lil Uzi Vert

from the album The Perfect LUV Tape
- Released: July 31, 2016
- Genre: Trap
- Length: 2:55
- Label: Atlantic
- Songwriters: Symere Woods; Donald Cannon; Jamaal Henry
- Producers: Don Cannon; Jamaal Henry

"Do What I Want" is a song by American rapper Lil Uzi Vert. It was released on July 31, 2016, as the first track off of their mixtape The Perfect LUV Tape. The track peaked at number one on the Bubbling Under Hot 100 chart.

== Music video ==
The music video for the track was released on April 27, 2017. The video was filmed in Honolulu, Hawaii.

== Critical reception ==
The track received generally positive reviews. Michael Saponara of Billboard called the track "an inspiration to fans across the globe". Sheldon Pearce of Pitchfork said that the track "sums up Uzi’s core philosophy".

== Media usage ==
The song was used in an October 2016 commercial for Westbrook 0.2 Jordans featuring Russell Westbrook.

The song was used in NBA 2K18 (2017) soundtrack.

== Charts ==
Chart (2017)	Peak position
Canada (Canadian Hot 100)	95
US Bubbling Under Hot 100 Singles (Billboard)	1
US Bubbling Under R&B/Hip-Hop Singles (Billboard)	1

== Certifications ==
Region	Certification	Certified units/sales
United States (RIAA)	3× Platinum	3,000,000^{‡}
^{‡} Sales+streaming figures based on certification alone.
