= The Perfect LUV Tape =

Mixtape by Lil Uzi Vert
- Released: July 31, 2016
- Studio: Means Street Studios (Atlanta)
- Genre: Trap
- Length: 32:33
- Labels: Atlantic; Generation Now
- Producers: Don Cannon; Cubeatz; DP Beats; Ike Beatz; Lyle LeDuff; Maaly Raw; Metro Boomin; Nard & B; Slade Da Monsta; XL Eagle; Zaytoven

Lil Uzi Vert chronology
| Lil Uzi Vert vs. the World (2016) | The Perfect LUV Tape (2016) | 1017 vs. the World (2016) |

The Perfect LUV Tape is the fourth mixtape by the American rapper and singer Lil Uzi Vert. It was released on July 31, 2016, by Atlantic Records and Generation Now. Following the success of Uzi's second commercial mixtape, Lil Uzi Vert vs. the World, the mixtape continues the bright, melodic trap sound they (Note: Lil Uzi Vert identifies as gender-nonconforming and uses they/them pronouns.) had developed on that project. It was primarily produced by Don Cannon and Maaly Raw and features guest appearances from Playboi Carti, Offset, and Future. The Perfect LUV Tape debuted at number 55 on the US Billboard 200, and was certified Platinum by the Recording Industry Association of America (RIAA) in December 2024. It received generally positive reviews from music critics, who praised Uzi's melodic vocals, energetic production, and versatility, although some considered the mixtape less cohesive than its predecessor.

== Background and release ==
In December 2015, Lil Uzi Vert signed to Atlantic Records under DJ Drama's Generation Now imprint. Following the release of Lil Uzi Vert vs. the World in April 2016, Lil Uzi Vert continued to develop their sound, which had become associated with the melodic and emotionally expressive style emerging from Atlanta's rap scene. Their growing reputation as a distinctive voice in hip hop stemmed from collaborations with producers such as Metro Boomin, Southside, TM88, and 808 Mafia, whose trap-influenced production shaped much of their early music. During this period, Uzi's personal life and creative process were closely tied to their relationship with their then-partner, Brittany Byrd. Their relationship influenced Uzi's songwriting and public image, with Byrd often contributing creative input on visuals and styling. Uzi also described her as an important source of support during their early success. On June 25, 2016, Uzi released "Stole Your Luv" on SoundCloud, shortly after announcing their split from Byrd on Twitter.

On July 12, 2016, Uzi announced The Perfect LUV Tape and shared a short audio preview on Twitter. On July 29, the mixtape's cover art was revealed. Designed by Farris Knudsen; it retained the animated visual aesthetic of Uzi's earlier releases. The Perfect LUV Tape was released by Atlantic and Generation Now on July 31, 2016. A music video for "Do What I Want" was released on April 27, 2017. Filmed in Honolulu, the music video was directed by Spike Jordan.

== Composition ==
=== Overview ===
Critics described The Perfect LUV Tape as continuing the bright, melodic trap sound developed on Lil Uzi Vert vs. the World. The mixtape was primarily produced by Don Cannon and Maaly Raw, with additional production from Metro Boomin, Zaytoven, DP Beats, and Nard & B. Its production features "day-glo" and "springy trap" beats with auto-tuned, singsong vocals. Andy Kellman of AllMusic wrote that Uzi maintains their "offhanded approach", delivering boastful and taunting lyrics in a "choppy and singsongy fashion". Sputnikmusic similarly described that while the mixtape offers "nothing new stylistically", it captures an "eccentric trap vibe" and a "bubbly, brightly colored" sound. The review described Uzi's music as "made for in-the-moment processing", emphasizing their "effortless charisma" and "rockstar swagger".

=== Songs ===
The opening track, "Do What I Want", features a "glistening trap beat" and lyrics referencing Uzi's debut single "Money Longer". Sheldon Pearce of Pitchfork wrote that it introduces Uzi's "sense of newfound freedom" and includes "effortless, earwormy" hooks. He also praised the Don Cannon and Maaly Raw production, describing its alternating and interlocking synthesizer riffs as complementing the song's carefree atmosphere. Bianca Giulione of Highsnobiety compared the song to "Money Longer", describing it as one of Uzi's most optimistic and uplifting tracks, and praised the production by Don Cannon and Maaly Raw for its hazy, melodic synthesizers. "Of Course We Ghetto Flowers", featuring Playboi Carti and Offset, pairs melodic vocals with the lyric "You a broke boy got bad luck, don't even talk to me", which Pearce described as central to the mixtape's fascination with love and status. Sputnikmusic highlighted the song's "youthful exuberance" and called it "excitingly fun". Giulione praised the performances of Uzi, Carti, and Offset, writing that all three artists brought their "mumble-esque A-game", while also highlighting Maaly Raw's "raw" and "wavy" production. Brian Duricy of PopMatters wrote that "Original Uzi (4 of Us)" showcases Uzi's confidence and "feel-good brags", while Lyons called the track "gorgeously hyperactive". Pearce also mentioned Zaytoven's "Money Mitch" and DP Beats' "I Can Drive" as stylistic variations.

"Erase Your Social"
"Erase Your Social" features a slower vocal cadence over melodic production, which samples Witt Lowry's "Wake Up"

"Money Mitch", produced by Zaytoven, was described by Sputnikmusic as "hard-hitting". Michael Saponara of Billboard praised Uzi's rapping, highlighting their "diverse array of flows", and described that the song's title references the character Mitch, portrayed by Mekhi Phifer in the 2002 film Paid in Full. "Sideline Watching (Hold Up)" was described by Sputnikmusic as featuring "syrupy and bouncing vocals", observing that each track "has its own idiosyncratic ability to brighten the mood". "Erase Your Social", produced by Lyle LeDuff and Don Cannon, features a slower vocal cadence over melodic production and samples Witt Lowry's "Wake Up". Saponara also highlighted the song's lyrical references to social media platforms. "Ronda (Winners)", produced by Metro Boomin and Cubeatz, was called "one of 2016's few inventive takes" on the tropical sound by Patrick Lyons of HotNewHipHop. Giulione characterized the track as featuring a marimba-inspired beat, reverb-heavy vocals, and an inspirational tone, suggesting it served as a tribute to mixed martial artist Ronda Rousey. "Seven Million", featuring Future and produced by Nard & B, contains "astronautical space screeches" and was described by Andy Kellman as a "straightforward and effective Future collaboration". Sputnikmusic referred to it as a "speaker-slapping" highlight. Giulione praised Future's cadence and highlighted Uzi's performance, writing that they transitioned seamlessly between melodic verses and ad-libs over what she described as one of the mixtape's strongest and most unconventional beats.

== Critical reception ==
The Perfect LUV Tape ratings
Review scores
| Source | Rating |
|---|---|
| AllMusic | 3/5 stars |
| HotNewHipHop | 76% |
| Pitchfork | 6.9/10 |
| PopMatters | 6/10 |
| Sputnikmusic | 3.0/5 |

Kellman of AllMusic described the mixtape as a similarly sized project of slightly lower quality than Lil Uzi Vert vs. the World. He emphasized its role in maintaining Uzi's 2016 commercial presence despite minimal stylistic development, with standout tracks like "Seven Million" and "Original Uzi (4 of Us)". Lyons of HotNewHipHop acknowledged the mixtape's consistency and "gooey melodies". Despite this, he felt it lacked the freshness and energy of Lil Uzi Vert vs. the World, critiquing Uzi's occasionally unadventurous vocal delivery, though tracks like "Canadian Goose" and "Ronda (Winners)" were highlighted for their infectious momentum.

Pearce's of Pitchfork review positioned The Perfect LUV Tape as a reaffirmation of Uzi's talent for synthesizing rap trends into a "catchy melodic soup", praising their earworm hooks and unconventional song structures. However, he highlighted a dip in vocal dynamism and a tendency to replicate past successes, making it less impactful than Lil Uzi Vert vs. the World. Duricy of PopMatters viewed the mixtape as a step forward in Uzi's progression. He considered it to be "more consistent than he's ever been" and commending their confident delivery and meta references, such as interpolating "Money Longer" in "Do What I Want", though he acknowledged Uzi had yet to match the potency of peers like Young Thug or 21 Savage. Sputnikmusic described the mixtape as offering "nothing new stylistically" but retaining an "eccentric trap vibe" with a "bubbly, brightly colored" sound.

== Commercial performance ==
The Perfect LUV Tape debuted at number 55 on the US Billboard 200. It also reached number 20 on Billboard's Top R&B/Hip-Hop Albums chart. The mixtape was certified Gold by the Recording Industry Association of America (RIAA) on February 5, 2018, and Platinum on December 10, 2024. "Do What I Want" was also certified Platinum by the RIAA.

== Track listing ==
Credits were adapted from the album's liner notes.

| No. | Title | Writer(s) | Producer(s) | Length |
|---|---|---|---|---|
| 1. | "Do What I Want" | Symere Woods; Donald Cannon; Jamaal Henry | Don Cannon; Maaly Raw | 2:55 |
| 2. | "Of Course We Ghetto Flowers" (featuring Playboi Carti and Offset) | Woods; Henry; Jordan Carter; Kiari Cephus | Maaly Raw | 4:22 |
| 3. | "Original Uzi (4 of Us)" | Woods; Henry; Ivison Smith | Maaly Raw; Ike Beatz | 2:46 |
| 4. | "Money Mitch" | Woods; Xavier Dotson | Zaytoven | 4:07 |
| 5. | "SideLine Watching (Hold Up)" | Woods; Dotson | Zaytoven | 3:11 |
| 6. | "I Can Drive" | Woods; Don Paschall | DP Beats | 2:33 |
| 7. | "You're Lost" | Woods; Cannon; Marcus Slade | Don Cannon; Slade Da Monsta | 2:38 |
| 8. | "Erase Your Social" | Woods; Cannon; Lyle LeDuff | Don Cannon; LeDuff^{[a]} | 3:20 |
| 9. | "Ronda (Winners)" | Woods; Leland Wayne; Kevin Gomringer; Tim Gomringer | Metro Boomin; Cubeatz^{[a]} | 3:36 |
| 10. | "Seven Million" (featuring Future) | Woods; Cannon; Nayvadius Cash; James Rosser Jr.; Brandon Rackley | Don Cannon; Nard & B; XL Eagle^{[b]} | 3:02 |
| Total length: | | | | 32:33 |

Notes

- ^{^[a]} signifies a co-producer
- ^{^[b]} signifies an uncredited co-producer

== Personnel ==
Credits were adapted from Tidal, and the album's liner notes.

Musicians

- Cubeatz – co-production (9)
- DP Beats – production (6)
- Don Cannon – production (1, 7, 8, 10)
- Future – vocals (10)
- Ike Beatz – production (3)
- LeDuff – co-production (8)
- Lil Uzi Vert – vocals
- Maaly Raw – production (1, 2, 3)
- Metro Boomin – production (9)
- Nard & B – production (9)
- Offset – vocals (2)
- Playboi Carti – vocals (2)
- Slade Da Monsta – production (7)
- XL Eagle – co-production (10)
- Zaytoven – production (4, 5)

Technical

- Don Cannon – mixing (7, 10), executive producer
- Leighton "LakeShow" Morrison – executive producer, management
- Tyree "DJ Drama" Simmons – executive producer
- Kesha "K. Lee" Lee – recording (all tracks), mixing (1, 6)
- Chris Athens – mastering (all tracks)

Artwork

- Farris Knudsen – art design
- Matt Meiners – package design

== Charts ==
=== Weekly charts ===
| Chart (2016) | Peak position |
|---|---|
| US Billboard 200 | 55 |
| US Top R&B/Hip-Hop Albums (Billboard) | 20 |

=== Year-end charts ===
| Chart (2017) | Position |
|---|---|
| US Billboard 200 | 110 |
| US Top R&B/Hip-Hop Albums (Billboard) | 86 |

== Certifications ==
| Region | Certification | Certified units/sales |
|---|---|---|
| United States (RIAA) | Platinum | 1,000,000^{‡} |
^{‡} Sales+streaming figures based on certification alone.
