= Luv Is Rage 1.5 =

- The project does not have a cover art. These are the covers for its tracks.

EP by Lil Uzi Vert
- Released: February 26, 2017
- Recorded: 2016–2017
- Genres: Hip-hop; trap; cloud rap
- Length: 12:29
- Label: Leaked
- Producers: Derelle Rideout; DJ Plugg; DP Beats; JW Lucas; TM88

Lil Uzi Vert chronology
1017 vs. the World (2016)	Luv Is Rage 1.5 (2017)	Luv Is Rage 2 (2017)

Singles from Luv Is Rage 1.5
- 1. "XO Tour Llif3" Released: March 24, 2017

Luv Is Rage 1.5 is the second extended play by American rapper and singer Lil Uzi Vert. It was released independently on February 26, 2017 exclusively on SoundCloud as throwaway tracks from their debut studio album, Luv Is Rage 2 (2017). The project includes four tracks – including the single "XO Tour Llif3" which was included later on Luv Is Rage 2 – and features production from Derelle Rideout, DJ Plugg, DP Beats, JW Lucas and TM88. The cover art features Young Thug and The Weeknd with Lil Uzi Vert, because the songs "YSL" and "XO Tour Llif3" are named after their respective labels YSL Records and XO, as well as the latter's fandom.

== Background ==
The four-track project was uploaded exclusively to Lil Uzi Vert's SoundCloud account, with the intention of generating excitement for their following release, Luv Is Rage 2. The EP quickly amassed millions of plays despite not having a commercial release. Most notably the song "XO Tour Llif3" gained significant online attention, resulting in its commercial release as a single and later its inclusion on Luv Is Rage 2.

== Singles ==
On March 24, 2017, Lil Uzi Vert released "XO Tour Llif3" to streaming services as a single and in May 2017 peaked at number 7 on the US Billboard Hot 100.

== Track listing ==
Track listing is in order of upload date on SoundCloud, as no track order was officially released.

No.	Title	Writer(s)	Producer(s)	Length
1.	"Boring Shit"	Symere Woods; Derelle Rideout	Derelle Rideout	3:10
2.	"Luv Scars K.o 1600"	Woods; Kenneth Smith	DJ Plugg	3:02
3.	"XO Tour Llif3"	Woods; Bryan Simmons; John Lucas	TM88; JW Lucas	3:02
4.	"YSL"	Woods; Don Paschall Jr.	DP Beats	3:15
Total length:				12:29

Sample credits

- "Boring Shit" contains uncredited samples of theme music of Reading Rainbow, written by Stephen Horelick, Dennis Neil Kleinman, and Janet Weir, as a rendition for "PBS Kids Medley" by The James Finley Chorale
