= Sauce It Up =

Single by Lil Uzi Vert

from the album Luv Is Rage 2
- Released: February 27, 2018
- Length: 3:27
- Label: Generation Now; Atlantic
- Songwriters: Symere Woods; Don Cannon
- Producers: Don Cannon; Michael Piroli; BeldonDidThat

Lil Uzi Vert singles chronology
"Wanted You" (2017)	"Sauce It Up" (2018)	"Watch" (2018)

"Sauce It Up" is a song by American rapper Lil Uzi Vert from their debut album Luv Is Rage 2 (2017). It was released as the album's third single to urban contemporary radio on February 27, 2018. The track was produced by Don Cannon and written by Cannon and Lil Uzi Vert. It peaked at number 49 on the US Billboard Hot 100.

== Chart performance ==
"Sauce It Up" debuted at number 49 on the Billboard Hot 100 for the chart dated September 23, 2017.

== Charts ==
=== Weekly charts ===
Chart (2017–2018)	Peak position
Canada (Canadian Hot 100)	82
US Billboard Hot 100	49
US Hot R&B/Hip-Hop Songs (Billboard)	21
US Rhythmic Airplay (Billboard)	15

=== Year-end charts ===
Chart (2017)	Position
US Hot R&B/Hip-Hop Songs (Billboard)	94

=== Year-end charts ===
Chart (2018)	Position
US Hot R&B/Hip-Hop Songs (Billboard)	60

== Certifications ==
Region	Certification	Certified units/sales
New Zealand (RMNZ)	Gold	15,000^{‡}
United States (RIAA)	4× Platinum	4,000,000^{‡}
^{‡} Sales+streaming figures based on certification alone.
