= List of Billboard 200 number-one albums of 2017 =

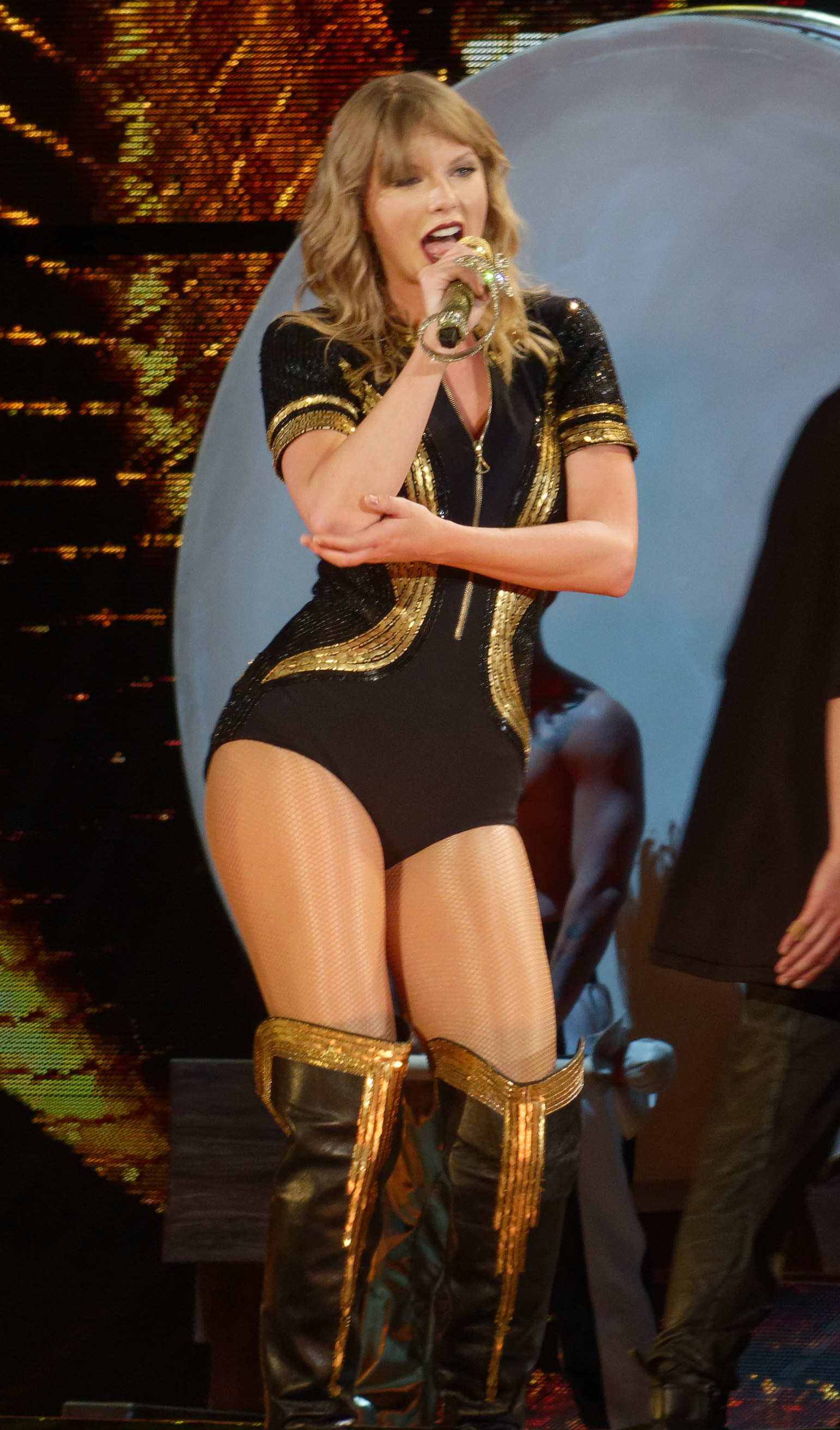
Taylor Swift's sixth studio album, Reputation, earned the biggest sales week of 2017, selling over 1.2 million copies in its first week. It became the best-selling album of 2017.

The highest-selling albums and EPs in the United States are ranked in the Billboard 200, which is published by Billboard magazine. The data are compiled by Nielsen Soundscan based on each album's weekly physical and digital sales, as well as on-demand streaming and digital sales of its individual tracks.

In 2017, a total of 38 albums claimed the top position of the chart. Beginning with vocal group Pentatonix's Christmas album, A Pentatonix Christmas, issue dated January 7, another one of which, Canadian singer The Weeknd's third studio album, Starboy returned to the top slot a week later after three weeks from the slot, issue dated December 17, 2016.

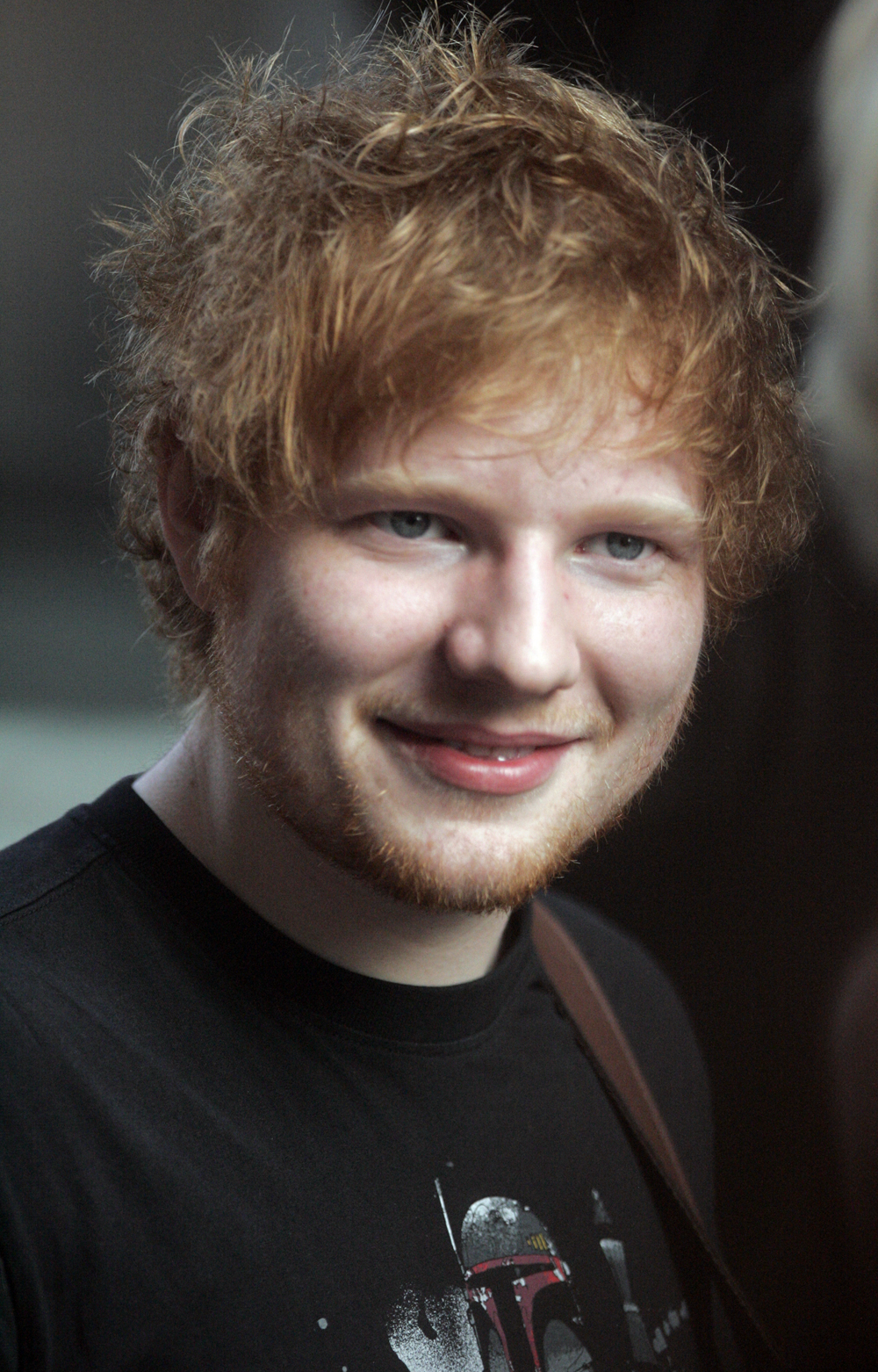
British singer-songwriter Ed Sheeran's third studio album, ÷, was the most consumed album. It moved over 2.764 million album equivalent units in 2017.

Ed Sheeran's third studio album, ÷ (Divide) was the most consumed album of 2017 with 2.764 million equivalent album units with 1.1 million of that sum coming from traditional album sales according to Nielsen Music. Kendrick Lamar's fourth studio album Damn was the second best-selling album of 2017 with 2.747 million equivalent album units according to Nielsen Music. Taylor Swift's sixth studio album, Reputation, was the best-selling album of 2017 with 1.9 million sales, and the third most consumed, with 2.336 million units moved in 2017.

Rapper Future also made Billboard history releasing two different albums in a week apart: his fifth self-titled album and sixth follow-up, Hndrxx. Both managed to peak atop the chart. Aside from A Pentatonix Christmas, Starboy, ÷, More Life, Damn and Reputation, the only two number-ones with extended chart runs include: Grateful by DJ Khaled and 4:44 by Jay-Z, four of which spent only two weeks at the top position.

== Chart history ==
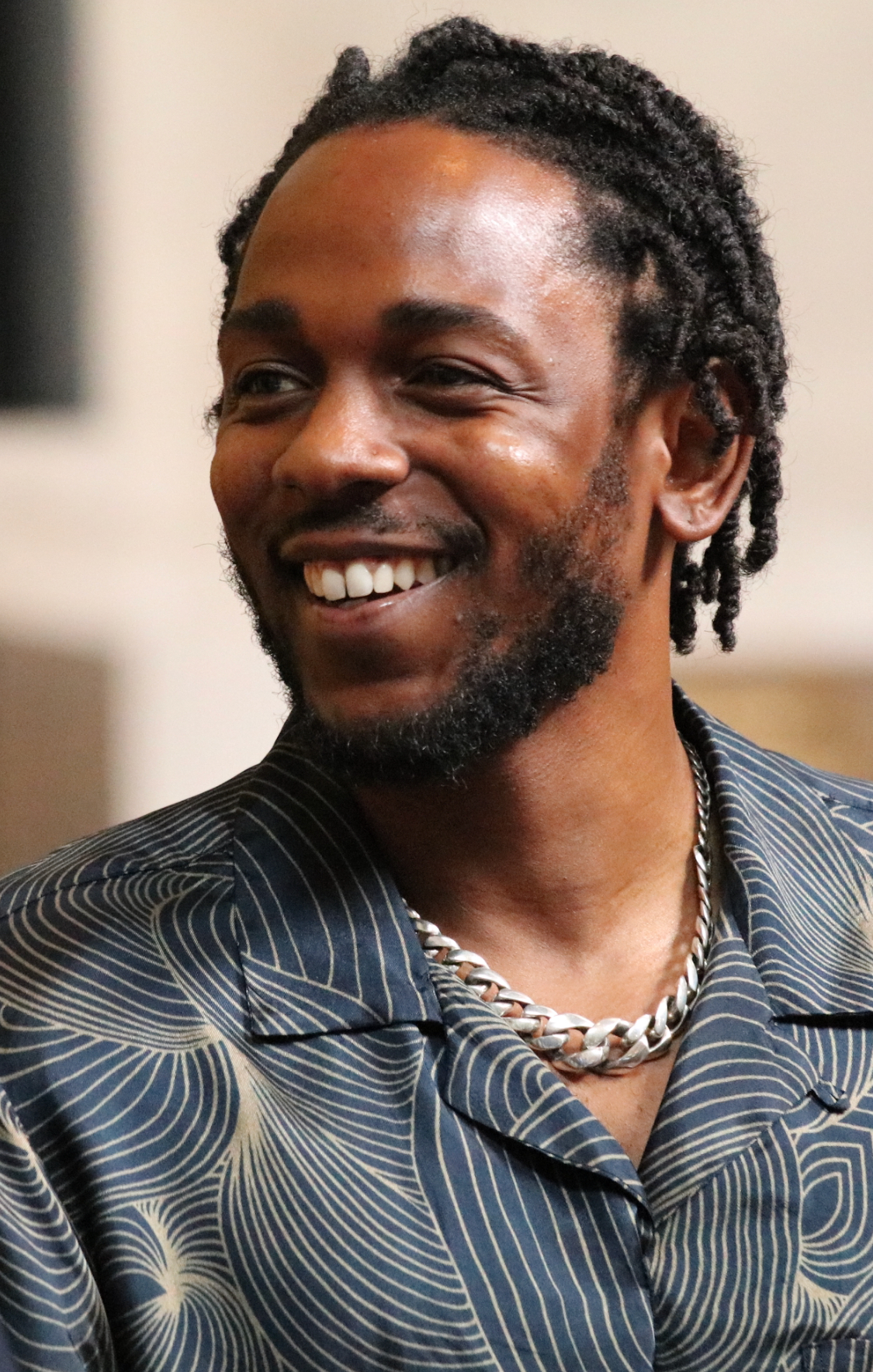
Rapper Kendrick Lamar's Damn spent four weeks atop the chart. It was the second most consumed album of 2017, moving 2.747 million units in 2017.

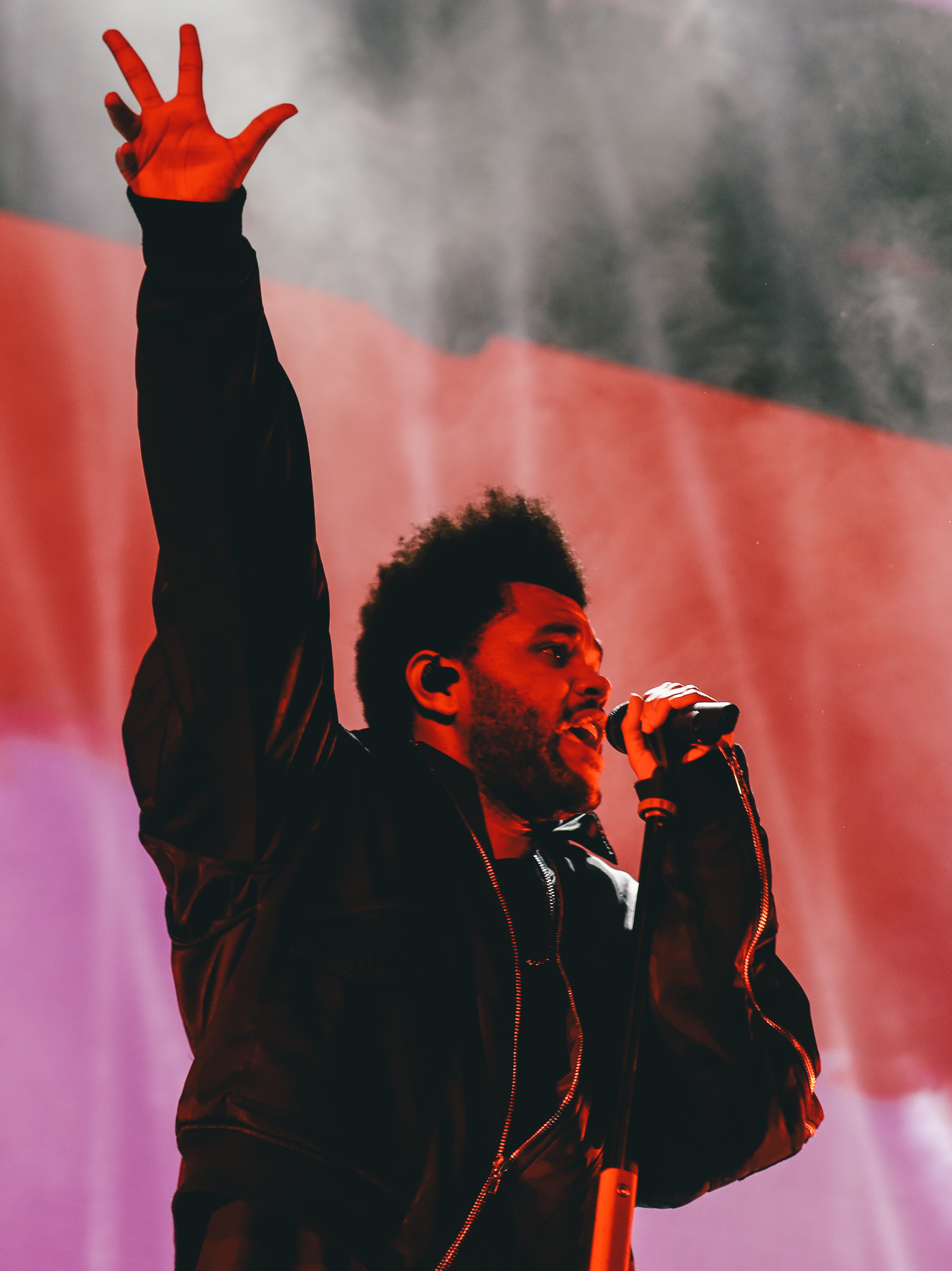
The Weeknd's Starboy topped the chart for four consecutive weeks, standing as his second number-one album in the US.

Key
†	Indicates best performing album of 2017

Issue date	Album	Artist(s)	Album- equivalent units	Ref.
January 7	A Pentatonix Christmas	Pentatonix	206,000	
January 14	A Pentatonix Christmas	Pentatonix	101,000	
January 21	Starboy	The Weeknd	69,000	
January 28	Starboy	The Weeknd	63,000	
February 4	Starboy	The Weeknd	61,000	
February 11	Starboy	The Weeknd	56,000	
February 18	Culture	Migos	131,000	
February 25	I Decided.	Big Sean	151,000	
March 4	Fifty Shades Darker	Soundtrack	123,000	
March 11	Future	Future	140,000	
March 18	Hndrxx	Future	121,000	
March 25	÷	Ed Sheeran	451,000	
April 1	÷	Ed Sheeran	180,000	
April 8	More Life	Drake	505,000	
April 15	More Life	Drake	226,000	
April 22	More Life	Drake	136,000	
April 29	Memories...Do Not Open	The Chainsmokers	221,000	
May 6	Damn †	Kendrick Lamar	603,000	
May 13	Damn †	Kendrick Lamar	239,000	
May 20	Damn †	Kendrick Lamar	173,000	
May 27	Everybody	Logic	247,000	
June 3	Harry Styles	Harry Styles	230,000	
June 10	One More Light	Linkin Park	111,000	
June 17	True to Self	Bryson Tiller	107,000	
June 24	Hopeless Fountain Kingdom	Halsey	106,000	
July 1	Witness	Katy Perry	180,000	
July 8	Melodrama	Lorde	109,000	
July 15	Grateful	DJ Khaled	149,000	
July 22	Grateful	DJ Khaled	70,000	
July 29	4:44	Jay-Z	262,000	
August 5	4:44	Jay-Z	87,000	
August 12	Lust for Life	Lana Del Rey	107,000	
August 19	Everything Now	Arcade Fire	100,000	
August 26	Damn †	Kendrick Lamar	47,000	
September 2	Rainbow	Kesha	117,000	
September 9	Science Fiction	Brand New	58,000	
September 16	Luv Is Rage 2	Lil Uzi Vert	135,000	
September 23	American Dream	LCD Soundsystem	85,000	
September 30	Life Changes	Thomas Rhett	123,000	
October 7	Concrete and Gold	Foo Fighters	127,000	
October 14	Wonderful Wonderful	The Killers	118,000	
October 21	Now	Shania Twain	137,000	
October 28	Perception	NF	55,000	
November 4	Beautiful Trauma	Pink	408,000	
November 11	Flicker	Niall Horan	152,000	
November 18	Live in No Shoes Nation	Kenny Chesney	219,000	
November 25	The Thrill of It All	Sam Smith	237,000	
December 2	Reputation	Taylor Swift	1,238,000	
December 9	Reputation	Taylor Swift	256,000	
December 16	Reputation	Taylor Swift	147,000	
December 23	Songs of Experience	U2	186,000	
December 30	What Makes You Country	Luke Bryan	108,000	

== Number-one artists ==
List of number-one artists by total weeks at number one
Position	Artist	Weeks at No. 1
1	The Weeknd	4
1	Kendrick Lamar	4
4	Drake	3
4	Taylor Swift	3
9	Pentatonix	2
9	Future	2
9	Ed Sheeran	2
9	DJ Khaled	2
9	Jay-Z	2
13	Migos	1
13	Big Sean	1
13	The Chainsmokers	1
13	Logic	1
13	Harry Styles	1
13	Linkin Park	1
13	Bryson Tiller	1
13	Halsey	1
13	Katy Perry	1
13	Lorde	1
13	Lana Del Rey	1
13	Arcade Fire	1
13	Kesha	1
13	Brand New	1
13	Lil Uzi Vert	1
13	LCD Soundsystem	1
13	Thomas Rhett	1
13	Foo Fighters	1
13	The Killers	1
13	Shaina Twain	1
13	NF	1
13	Pink	1
13	Niall Horan	1
13	Kenny Chesney	1
13	Sam Smith	1
13	U2	1
13	Luke Bryan	1

== See also ==
- 2017 in American music
- List of Billboard Hot 100 number ones of 2017
