= Wanted You =

2017 single by Nav featuring Lil Uzi Vert

Single by Nav featuring Lil Uzi Vert

from the album Reckless
- Released: November 3, 2017
- Genre: Emo rap
- Length: 3:48
- Label: XO; Republic
- Songwriters: Navraj Goraya; Symere Woods; Amir Esmailian; Khaled Khaled; Benjamin Diehl
- Producer: Ben Billions

Nav singles chronology
"Perfect Timing (Intro)" / "Call Me" (2017)	"Wanted You" (2017)	"Freshman List" (2018)

Lil Uzi Vert singles chronology
"The Way Life Goes" (2017)	"Wanted You" (2017)	"Sauce It Up" (2018)

"Wanted You" is a song by Canadian rapper Nav featuring American rapper Lil Uzi Vert. It was released on November 3, 2017, as the lead single from Nav's debut studio album Reckless (2018). The song was written alongside Cash, DJ Khaled, and producer Ben Billions.

== Composition ==
The song is a "mellow trap ballad" featuring keys with "punctuations of drums and shimmering hi-hats". On the track, Nav and Lil Uzi Vert sing about their past failed relationships. In the first verse, Nav expresses disappointment in having a relationship with a girl he met on Instagram, only to find she cares only about the luxurious lifestyle he offers. In the second verse, Lil Uzi sing-raps about being cheated on and having gratitude for what they have.

== Charts ==
Chart (2017)	Peak position
Canada Hot 100 (Billboard)	33
Latvia (DigiTop100)	95
US Billboard Hot 100	64
US Hot R&B/Hip-Hop Songs (Billboard)	27

== Certifications ==
Region	Certification	Certified units/sales
Canada (Music Canada)	4× Platinum	320,000^{‡}
New Zealand (RMNZ)	Gold	15,000^{‡}
United States (RIAA)	2× Platinum	2,000,000^{‡}
^{‡} Sales+streaming figures based on certification alone.
