= XO Tour Llif3 =

2017 single by Lil Uzi Vert

Single by Lil Uzi Vert

from the album Luv Is Rage 1.5 and Luv Is Rage 2
- Released: February 26, 2017 (SoundCloud); March 24, 2017 (single)
- Recorded: January 2017
- Genre: Emo rap; trap
- Length: 3:02
- Label: Generation Now; Atlantic
- Songwriters: Symere Woods; Bryan Simmons; John Wesley Lucas
- Producers: TM88; JW Lucas

Lil Uzi Vert singles chronology
"Go Off" (2017)	"XO Tour Llif3" (2017)	"Wokeuplikethis" (2017)

Original cover

Music video
- "XO Tour Llif3" on YouTube

Audio sample
- file; help

"XO Tour Llif3" (stylized as "XO TOUR Llif3" and pronounced "XO Tour Life") is a song by American rapper Lil Uzi Vert from the EP Luv Is Rage 1.5 (2017) and debut album Luv Is Rage 2 (2017). It was released on SoundCloud on February 26, 2017, and later on all music streaming platforms on March 24, 2017. The track was written by Lil Uzi Vert and produced by TM88 and JW Lucas, who are also credited as co-writers. The song's title references the record label of the same name, founded by Canadian pop/R&B singer The Weeknd and the song was recorded while Lil Uzi Vert was embarking on tour with The Weeknd.

The song received widespread critical acclaim and peaked at number seven on the US Billboard Hot 100, becoming Lil Uzi Vert's highest-charting single as a solo artist until the release of "Futsal Shuffle 2020", which peaked at number five. It was also their second top 10 entry overall after their feature on "Bad and Boujee" by Migos. It is Lil Uzi Vert's most popular song, and has amassed over two billion streams on Spotify. On December 10, 2024, the song was certified RIAA Diamond selling over 14 million copies, giving them their first Diamond certification and making it one of the best-selling emo rap songs, and also one of the best-selling digital singles. A sequel to the song, titled "P2" was included on Lil Uzi Vert's second album Eternal Atake (2020). The song has since come to be regarded as Lil Uzi Vert's signature song.

It was later featured on the soundtrack for WWE 2K20.

== Background ==
"XO Tour Llif3" began when Lil Uzi Vert started collaborating with producer TM88. Lil Uzi Vert originally contacted TM88 through FaceTime while TM88 was in Miami to work with rappers Future and Gucci Mane. TM88's return flight to Atlanta was delayed due to the Fort Lauderdale airport shooting. During the ten-hour wait at the airport following the shooting, TM88 lost his laptop charger. When TM88 returned to Atlanta, he could not access his laptop, leading to him using an old computer and a Beats Pill speaker to produce the instrumental for "XO Tour Llif3".

On February 26, 2017, Lil Uzi Vert released Luv Is Rage 1.5, an extended play consisting of four tracks, including "XO Tour Llif3", on their SoundCloud account. The song quickly amassed millions of plays and attention across social media, and as a result was given a commercial release. The popularity of "XO Tour Llif3" resulted in the viral "Lil Uzi Vert Challenge".

== Composition ==
"XO Tour Llif3" is an emo rap and trap song composed in common time (4/4 time) with a length of three minutes two seconds and written in B minor with a tempo of 155 beats per minute with a common chord progression of Gmaj7—Em—Bm—A. The song is inspired by Lil Uzi Vert's relationship with Brittany Byrd and the couple's eventual break-up in June 2016. The themes of the song focus around substance abuse, quoting Xanax and prescription drug abuse as a way to relieve heartbreak. Lil Uzi Vert references money numerous times on the track with one line stating "all my friends are dead" citing the use of deceased presidents on banknotes.

TM88 produced "XO Tour Llif3" on FL Studio. The song's instrumental was created by remixing a beat he had produced three years earlier in collaboration with JW Lucas. TM88 sped up the original beat and chopped the intro and the first verse before using the FL Studio plugin Gross Beat to manipulate the volume and the time of the instrumental.

== Critical reception ==
"XO Tour Llif3" was lauded by music critics. Pitchfork writer Matthew Strauss stated, "Uzi resists total caricature with [their] liberal use of dark, manic details, and on 'XO TOUR Llif3' [they channel] the indulgence of dulled senses perfected by Future at his DS2 peak." Regarding the production, Strauss claimed, "TM88's slightly psychedelic minor key production, gives Uzi's nonchalance the feeling of a daydream." Jordan Sargent of Spin wrote, "Though the song is an instant hit among Uzi Vert's growing and feverish fanbase—so much so that [their] label fast tracked an animated video that hit YouTube this morning—it also works as a good entry point for anyone who has not yet approached an artist who is poised to become one of the most ubiquitous voices in rap".

Complex and Pigeons & Planes named it the best song of the year, Billboard and Pitchfork considered it the fifth-best song of the year, The New York Times's Jon Caramanica the eighth, Rolling Stone staff considered it the seventeenth, and Entertainment Weekly the twelfth.

== Commercial performance ==
"XO Tour Llif3" entered the Billboard Hot 100 chart issued April 4, 2017 at number 49 and peaked at number 7 in May 2017. Spotify recognized the song as one of the most streamed tracks of the summer of 2017 in the US.

By September 2017, the song had generated 1.3 billion streams across all streaming platforms, generating $4.5 million with Lil Uzi Vert only earning $900,000. Lil Uzi Vert made an estimated $0.00069231 per play.

The song currently sits at over 2 billion streams across streaming platforms.

== Music videos ==
On March 13, 2017, an animated music video for "XO Tour Llif3" was released on Lil Uzi Vert's YouTube channel. The video, which has been quoted as "trippy", was animated by Andrew William Ralph and features a cartoon version of Lil Uzi Vert gripping a steering wheel while holding a lit blunt in between their fingers. It received over 290 million views as of August 2018. The video has been unlisted on YouTube since the release of the official video on September 4, 2017.

On August 4, 2017, the song's official lyric video was released. Directed by Jered Harrison, the video shows an animated version of Uzi riding their motorcycle out of the cargo hold of an airplane and into a purple sky as dollar bills materialize in the air around them before landing in a crowd of fans. The video also became unlisted on YouTube beginning on September 4 but was made public again by December 16, 2017.

On September 4, 2017, the official music video for "XO Tour Llif3" was released; it features XO artists The Weeknd and Nav in cameo appearances. Directed by fashion designer Virgil Abloh, the video was shot in France in the 10th arrondissement of Paris. The video contains mirrored Arabic subtitles which "translate to gibberish" as a stylistic element. Arabic translators had been enlisted to produce accurate subtitles, but these went unused, with co-director Alvin Sonic opining that he "loved" the final subtitles' "'wrong' look"; The Fader criticized the decision as "blatantly disrespectful" to Arabic speakers. The official video has received over 544 million views as of August 2024.

== Sequel ==
On March 6, 2020, Lil Uzi Vert released a "lyrically reflective" sequel to the song, simply titled "P2", as part of their second studio album, Eternal Atake. The song contains the same drum beat and melodic elements of the original's chorus, with Lil Uzi changing the chorus line to "I don't really care 'cause I'm done".

== Charts ==
=== Weekly charts ===
Weekly chart performance for "XO Tour Llif3"
Chart (2017)	Peak position
Australia (ARIA)	37
Australia Urban (ARIA)	5
Austria (Ö3 Austria Top 40)	65
Belgium (Ultratop 50 Flanders)	35
Belgium (Ultratip Bubbling Under Wallonia)	20
Canada Hot 100 (Billboard)	10
Czech Republic Singles Digital (ČNS IFPI)	35
Denmark (Tracklisten)	32
France (SNEP)	87
Germany (GfK)	77
Hungary (Stream Top 40)	33
Ireland (IRMA)	45
Italy (FIMI)	62
Latvia (DigiTop100)	16
Netherlands (Single Top 100)	60
New Zealand (Recorded Music NZ)	16
Philippines (Philippine Hot 100)	69
Portugal (AFP)	14
Slovakia Singles Digital (ČNS IFPI)	32
Sweden (Sverigetopplistan)	33
Switzerland (Schweizer Hitparade)	48
UK Singles (Official Charts)	25
UK Hip Hop/R&B (Official Charts)	26
US Billboard Hot 100	7
US Hot R&B/Hip-Hop Songs (Billboard)	5
US Rhythmic Airplay (Billboard)	6

=== Year-end charts ===
2017 year-end chart performance for "XO Tour Llif3"
Chart (2017)	Position
Brazil (Pro-Música Brasil)	171
Canada (Canadian Hot 100)	18
Denmark (Tracklisten)	43
New Zealand (Recorded Music NZ)	26
Portugal (AFP)	22
Sweden (Sverigetopplistan)	60
Switzerland (Schweizer Hitparade)	87
UK Singles (Official Charts Company)	61
US Billboard Hot 100	13
US Hot R&B/Hip-Hop Songs (Billboard)	9
US Rhythmic (Billboard)	24

2018 year-end chart performance for "XO Tour Llif3"
Chart (2018)	Position
Estonia (Eesti Tipp-40)	53
Portugal (AFP)	67

== Certifications ==
Certifications for "XO Tour Llif3"
Region	Certification	Certified units/sales
Australia (ARIA)	3× Platinum	210,000^{‡}
Austria (IFPI Austria)	Platinum	30,000^{‡}
Belgium (BRMA)	Gold	10,000^{‡}
Denmark (IFPI Danmark)	2× Platinum	180,000^{‡}
France (SNEP)	Diamond	333,333^{‡}
Germany (BVMI)	Platinum	400,000^{‡}
Italy (FIMI)	2× Platinum	100,000^{‡}
New Zealand (RMNZ)	6× Platinum	180,000^{‡}
Poland (ZPAV)	2× Platinum	40,000^{‡}
Portugal (AFP)	2× Platinum	20,000^{‡}
Spain (Promusicae)	Platinum	60,000^{‡}
United Kingdom (BPI)	3× Platinum	1,800,000^{‡}
United States (RIAA)	14× Platinum	14,000,000^{‡}
^{‡} Sales+streaming figures based on certification alone.

== See also ==
- List of best-selling singles in the United States
