= Watch (Travis Scott song) =

Single by Travis Scott featuring Lil Uzi Vert and Kanye West

from the album Astroworld (intended)
- Released: May 4, 2018
- Genre: Trap
- Length: 3:37
- Label: Cactus Jack; Grand Hustle; Epic
- Songwriters: Jacques Webster II; Symere Woods; Kanye West; Jordan Jenks
- Producer: Pi'erre Bourne

Travis Scott singles chronology
"Close" (2018)	"Watch" (2018)	"Champion" (2018)

Lil Uzi Vert singles chronology
"Sauce It Up" (2018)	"Watch" (2018)	"Wasted" (2018)

Kanye West singles chronology
"Ye vs. the People" (2018)	"Watch" (2018)	"Yikes" (2018)

"Watch" is a song by American rapper Travis Scott featuring fellow American rappers Lil Uzi Vert and Kanye West. Written alongside producer Pi'erre Bourne, it was released by Cactus Jack, Grand Hustle, and Epic Records on May 4, 2018. It was expected to be the second single from Scott's third studio album Astroworld, before being excluded when the album was released on August 3, 2018.

== Release ==
American supermodel and reality star and Travis Scott's girlfriend at the time, Kylie Jenner, first teased the track via her Snapchat story on April 24, 2018, West also teased it on Twitter the following day. A day before the song's release, Scott revealed its release date and cover art, the latter of which includes a roller coaster, a skull with fire in its eye sockets, flowers and a gem-encrusted gold watch. On May 11, Scott premiered a vertical video for the song exclusively on Spotify, in which Uzi and West were absent. It was shot at Six Flags Magic Mountain.

== Composition ==
"Watch" is a trap song which samples Ronald Jenkees' 2012 song "Early Morning May" and KSupreme's unreleased song "Expensive Shit". According to Rolling Stone's Althea Legaspi, "the track opens with an amusement park clip of a child at AstroWorld, and a whimsical, woozy musical vibe follows that befits that theme". Lyrically, Uzi raps about their cash flow, while West raps about opioid addiction and addresses his controversial social position. The outro was spoken by Scott's then-girlfriend Kylie Jenner.

== Critical reception ==
Sheldon Pearce of Pitchfork regarded the song as "an enjoyable ego trip full of empty-calorie raps, reliant entirely on the premise that you are as enthralled by these three artists as they are with themselves". He noted "Pi'erre's superb ear-bending production" as "the song's best feature", writing that "Scott is largely forgettable" due to his "toneless, flat, and unchanging" hums.

== Live performances ==
On May 6, 2018, Scott made a live performance debut of the song during an appearance at Avenue nightclub in Los Angeles.

== Personnel ==
Credits adapted from Tidal.

- Travis Scott – vocals
- Lil Uzi Vert – vocals
- Kanye West – vocals
- Pi'erre Bourne – production
- Jimmy Cash – engineering
- Noah Goldstein – engineering
- Mike Dean – mixing engineering, mastering engineering

== Charts ==
Chart (2018)	Peak position
Australia (ARIA)	65
Canada Hot 100 (Billboard)	24
New Zealand Heatseekers (RMNZ)	2
Portugal (AFP)	78
Switzerland (Schweizer Hitparade)	62
UK Singles (Official Charts)	53
US Billboard Hot 100	16
US Hot R&B/Hip-Hop Songs (Billboard)	9
US Rhythmic Airplay (Billboard)	21

== Certifications ==
Region	Certification	Certified units/sales
Canada (Music Canada)	Gold	40,000^{‡}
New Zealand (RMNZ)	Gold	15,000^{‡}
United States (RIAA)	Platinum	1,000,000^{‡}
^{‡} Sales+streaming figures based on certification alone.

== Release history ==
Region	Date	Format	Label	Ref.
Various	May 4, 2018	Digital download; streaming	Epic	
United States	May 29, 2018	Rhythmic contemporary radio	Epic	
