= 20 Min =

Song by Lil Uzi Vert

from the album Luv Is Rage 2
- Released: November 17, 2017
- Genre: Cloud rap
- Length: 3:41
- Label: Generation Now; Atlantic
- Songwriters: Symere Woods; Carlton Mays, Jr.
- Producer: Honorable C.N.O.T.E.

Music video
- "20 Min" on YouTube

"20 Min" is a song by American rapper Lil Uzi Vert. It was released on November 17, 2017, as a bonus track on their debut album Luv Is Rage 2. Though it did not chart upon release, it became a viral sleeper hit in 2020 after gaining popularity on the TikTok video sharing app.

== Background ==
Lil Uzi Vert first previewed the song's demo on Instagram Live in January 2017, featuring a different synth which was changed in the final version.

== Composition and lyrics ==
Over a Cloud rap beat, Lil Uzi Vert raps about their rise to fame, and their fleeting encounters with women, specifically that of their ex lover Brittany Byrd.

== Charts ==
Chart performance for "20 Min"
| Chart (2017) | Peak position |
|---|---|
| US Bubbling Under Hot 100 (Billboard) | 17 |

== Certifications ==
Certifications for "20 Min"
| Region | Certification | Certified units/sales |
|---|---|---|
| France (SNEP) | Gold | 100,000^{‡} |
| Italy (FIMI) | Gold | 50,000^{‡} |
| New Zealand (RMNZ) | 3× Platinum | 90,000^{‡} |
| Poland (ZPAV) | Platinum | 50,000^{‡} |
| Portugal (AFP) | Gold | 5,000^{‡} |
| United Kingdom (BPI) | Gold | 400,000^{‡} |
| United States (RIAA) | 6× Platinum | 6,000,000^{‡} |
^{‡} Sales+streaming figures based on certification alone.
