= The Way Life Goes (song) =

2017 single by Lil Uzi Vert

- Cover art for the remix featuring Nicki Minaj

Single by Lil Uzi Vert featuring Nicki Minaj

from the album Luv Is Rage 2
- Released: October 3, 2017 (album version); November 3, 2017 (remix)
- Recorded: 2017
- Genre: Emo rap
- Length: 3:41 (album version); 4:28 (remix)
- Label: Generation Now; Atlantic
- Songwriters: Symere Woods; Donald Cannon; Ivison Smith; Anthony West; Josephine Gucht; Onika Maraj (remix)
- Producers: Don Cannon; Ike Beatz

Lil Uzi Vert singles chronology
"Raf" (2017)	"The Way Life Goes" (2017)	"Wanted You" (2017)

Oh Wonder singles chronology
"High On Humans" (2017)	"The Way Life Goes" (2017)	"Superlove" (2018)

Nicki Minaj singles chronology
"MotorSport" (2017)	"The Way Life Goes (Remix)" (2017)	"Plain Jane (Remix)" (2017)

Music video
- "The Way Life Goes (Remix)" on YouTube

"The Way Life Goes" is a song by American rapper Lil Uzi Vert featuring British indie pop group Oh Wonder from Vert's debut album Luv Is Rage 2 (2017). According to Vert, the song was meant for people that were going through hard times. The song was released as the album's second single to urban contemporary radio on October 3, 2017. The track, produced by Don Cannon and Ike Beatz, samples vocals from Oh Wonder's 2015 song "Landslide". It debuted at number 39 on the Billboard Hot 100.

The remix to the single was released on November 3 with a guest appearance from rapper Nicki Minaj. This version would peak at number 24 on the Hot 100. The music video for it was released on December 4, 2017.

== Critical reception ==
Paul A. Thompson of Pitchfork opined that "[In] 'The Way Life Goes,' which is produced by Don Cannon and Ike Beatz, Uzi opens with a brief introduction to the other half of [their] failed relationship, punctuated with, "I like that girl too much, I wish I never met her." From there, [they launch] into a full interpolation of the first verse from Oh Wonder's "Landslide": "I know it hurts sometimes, but you’ll get over it/You’ll find another life to live." Uzi's less interested in the granular drama of the breakup than in the fallout, the moment three or four days later when reality starts to set in."

== Personnel ==
Credits adapted from YouTube and Tidal.

- Jaycen Joshua – mixing
- Michael Piroli – mixing
- Kesha Lee – engineering
- Chris Athens – mastering
- David Skinner – graphic design

== Charts ==
=== Weekly charts ===
Weekly chart performance
Chart (2017–2018)	Peak position
Australia (ARIA)	85
Canada Hot 100 (Billboard)	44
Portugal (AFP)	61
UK Singles (Official Charts)	87
US Billboard Hot 100	24
US Hot R&B/Hip-Hop Songs (Billboard)	11
US Rhythmic Airplay (Billboard)	13

=== Year-end charts ===
Annual chart rankings
Chart (2017)	Position
US Hot R&B/Hip-Hop Songs (Billboard)	70
Chart (2018)	Position
US Hot R&B/Hip-Hop Songs (Billboard)	58
US Streaming Songs (Billboard)	66

== Certifications ==
Region	Certification	Certified units/sales
Denmark (IFPI Danmark)	Gold	45,000^{‡}
New Zealand (RMNZ)	4× Platinum	120,000^{‡}
Poland (ZPAV)	Gold	25,000^{‡}
Portugal (AFP)	Gold	5,000^{‡}
United Kingdom (BPI) for remix version	Platinum	600,000^{‡}
United States (RIAA)	9× Platinum	9,000,000^{‡}
^{‡} Sales+streaming figures based on certification alone.
