= 16*29 =

- Artwork for the single "Bankroll"

Mixtape by Lil Uzi Vert and Playboi Carti
- Released: Unreleased
- Recorded: 2015–2024
- Studios: Various, including London sessions
- Genre: Hip-hop

16*29 is an unreleased collaborative mixtape by American rappers Lil Uzi Vert and Playboi Carti. Despite multiple leaks, recorded tracks, and a planned promotional tour, the mixtape was never officially released and is considered scrapped, though periodic updates from the artists have sustained public interest. The title 16*29 is thought to reference the artists' respective neighborhoods: Lil Uzi Vert's 1600 block in North Philadelphia and Playboi Carti's 2900 section in Atlanta.

== Background and development ==
Lil Uzi Vert and Playboi Carti rose to prominence in the mid-2010s with their innovative blend of trap and cloud rap. Their chemistry was evident in early collaborations, such as "Wokeuplikethis" and "Lookin" from Carti's self-titled debut commercial mixtape (2017), which featured Uzi and helped establish the foundation for a joint project. The concept of 16*29 was first hinted at in September 2017, when Carti posted a Snapchat featuring the punk rock band The Damned, captioned "Carti Uzi Tape * Uzi Carti Tape * 16.29".

According to Carti, recording sessions for 16*29 began as early as 2015, with the duo reportedly creating around 100 songs together. In a 2022 livestream with American streamer Adin Ross, Uzi revealed that approximately 40 tracks were recorded specifically for 16*29 during sessions in London, though the files were reportedly lost. Between 2018 and 2023, multiple tracks believed to be from the 16*29 sessions leaked online. "Bankroll", produced by DP Beats, leaked in February 2018 before being officially released on DponTheBeat Vol. 3 later that month. Other tracks, including "Big Bank" and "Break the Bank", showcased the project's bass-heavy, energetic sound. In 2023, following the release of Pink Tape, an unreleased collaboration with Carti briefly appeared on Uzi's YouTube channel before being replaced with "Patience" featuring Don Toliver.

== Tour and cancellation ==
In October 2017, Lil Uzi Vert and Playboi Carti announced the 16*29 Tour, an 18-city North American concert tour featuring support from G Herbo and SOB x RBE. The tour was intended to promote the forthcoming mixtape and included scheduled stops in Houston, Memphis, and Boston. However, only days after its announcement, the tour was canceled following Uzi's withdrawal, citing a need to "focus" in a Twitter post. The sudden cancellation led to speculation of a falling-out between the two artists, though Uzi later stated in 2019 that them and Carti had physically fought to resolve their differences.

By late 2017, 16*29 remained unreleased, and no official updates were provided regarding its status. The two artists later reconnected during recording sessions in 2021, when Uzi was working on Pink Tape and Carti on his unreleased Narcissist project, reviving interest in 16*29. In March 2023, Uzi further fueled speculation by posting an Instagram Story tagging Carti with the caption, "Me and my luv about 2 take over the world". In March 2025, Carti stated that his album Music (2025) faced delays due to sample clearance issues but highlighted Uzi’s contributions to the tracks "Jumpin" and "Twin Trim", indicating the possibility of a future collaboration.
