= Lil James =

American rapper

- Born: James Weddle Lacy; Detroit, Michigan
- Origin: Atlanta, Georgia
- Genres: Hip hop
- Years active: 2017–present
- Labels: Atlantic Records; Generation Now

James Weddle Lacy, better known by his stage name Lil James, is an American rapper. He was born in Detroit, Michigan and raised Atlanta, Georgia. He released his major label mixtape, 21 Years Later in August 2018 through Don Cannon and DJ Drama's record label Generation Now, an imprint of Atlantic Records.

== Early life ==
Lil James was born in Detroit, Michigan. His mother died early in his life, and he spent a large portion of his childhood in foster care. He began rapping at age 3. When he was 10 years old, Lil James moved to Atlanta, Georgia. As an adolescent, he had occasional run-ins with law enforcement, but later turned his focus toward music.

== Career ==
Lil James released two singles in 2017, "Followers" and "Can't Do It." By March 2018, he had been signed to Don Cannon and DJ Drama's Atlantic Records imprint, Generation Now. That month, he performed at South by Southwest for the first time. In April 2018, he released a music video for his song, "Followers", directed by SpuddsMckenzie.

In June 2018, he was featured alongside Jack Harlow and Sixteen on the Skeme song, "Get Sumn." The following month, Lil James was featured on the song, "Gang," as part of Skeme's Big Money Sonny mixtape. In August 2018, he released his first major label mixtape, 21 Years Later. The album had features from Kap G and Jacquees. The music video for the lead single, "Traphouse," was released in October 2018 via WorldStarHipHop.

== Discography ==
=== Mixtapes ===
List of mixtapes with selected album details
Title	Details
21 Years Later	Released: August 10, 2018 (US); Label: Generation Now, Atlantic Records; Formats: Digital download

=== Singles ===
List of singles showing year released and album name
Title	Year	Album
"Followers"	2017	Non-album single
"Can't Do It"	2017	Non-album single
"Traphouse"	2018	21 Years Later
