= Generation Now =

Generation Now may refer to:

- the American Hip-Hop record label founded by DJ Drama
- the 501(c) organization allegedly paid during the Ohio nuclear bribery scandal
- a professional wrestling show, see Generation Next (professional wrestling)
- a children's theatre partnership, see Children's Theatre Company
- a TV show that ran from 2012–2014 on Christian Television Network

== See also ==
- Now Generation, a 2014 Brazilian telenovela
- Now Generation Band, a Jamaican reggae band
