= Luv Is Rage =

Mixtape by Lil Uzi Vert
- Released: October 30, 2015
- Genres: R&B; trap
- Length: 60:25
- Labels: Generation Now; Atlantic
- Producers: Bobby Kritical; Chapo; Charlie Handsome; Charlie Heat; Digi; DJ Plugg; Don Cannon; DP Beats; FKi 1st; FKi; Lex Luger; Maaly Raw; MP808; Slade Da Monsta; Sonny Digital; TM88; Treez Lowkey; V12 The Hitman; Xay Scott; Wheezy

Lil Uzi Vert chronology
The Real Uzi (2014)	Luv Is Rage (2015)	Lil Uzi Vert vs. the World (2016)

Luv Is Rage is the second mixtape by American rapper Lil Uzi Vert. It was released on October 30, 2015, by Generation Now and Atlantic Records. The mixtape includes features from Young Thug and Wiz Khalifa. A sequel was released on August 25, 2017.

The project was reissued to the streaming services with 12 of the 16 tracks present. "Moist", "Queso", "Wit My Crew x 1987" and "Nuyork Nights at 21" are excluded.

== Background ==
In a 2016 interview with GlobalGrindTV, Lil Uzi Vert explained the title of Luv Is Rage:

It goes two different ways. It's, like, I usually just say the one way, but it go both ways. Like 'Luv Is Rage' is, like, L-U-V: it's Lil Uzi Vert, and, like, I'm a rockstar, I am rage, like everything I do, I'm raging. And, it's more, like, you know rage is, like, it's not that good, like, raging is, like, rebellious, like, and, like, with love, like, you know, love is good. Like, but love is also bad too. It's horrible. And it was, like, a lot of songs are a little darker and stuff and, like, you can hear the stuff that I say–stuff, like, yeah–I don't know, I'm always in a bad space, even if I'm, like–I don't know, I'm crazy.

The mixtape features Atlanta rapper Young Thug and fellow Pennsylvanian rapper Wiz Khalifa, whom Lil Uzi Vert considers to be one of their leading inspirations.

== Release and promotion ==
The music video for the Mixtape's first track "Safe House" was released on November 10, 2015 as a WorldStarHipHop exclusive directed by Spike Jordan. As of September 2024, the music video has accumulated over 122 million views.

The music video for "Super Saiyan Trunks" was released on July 8, 2015. The music video features clips from Dragon Ball, a Japanese animated television series. As of September 2024, the music video has accumulated over 10 million views. In November 2020 Lil Uzi Vert teased Super Saiyan 2 on Twitter as well as playing a short clip featuring a similar beat, flow and intro as well as the similar opening line "Have you ever made 10 million dollars with your talent?" after revealing they will be revising older styles of their music on their next project.

The music video for "All My Chains" was released on February 19, 2016. The music video features Lil Uzi Vert in North Philadelphia, where they were born and raised. As of September 2024, the music video has accumulated over 7 million views.

== Critical reception ==
The mixtape received generally positive reviews. Darryl Robertson of Vibe called the project "solid". Rose Lilah of HotNewHipHop called the features on the mixtape "quality". Kemet High of XXL said that the mixtape "depicts Uzi at [their] rawest state", and said that the project was "packed with swift melodies". In November 2018, The Nicholls Worth included Luv Is Rage in its list of the best mixtapes of the past decade, alongside Acid Rap (Chance the Rapper, 2013), Days Before Rodeo (Travis Scott, 2014), No Ceilings (Lil Wayne, 2009), Barter 6 (Young Thug, 2015), and A Love Letter to You (Trippie Redd, 2017).

== Commercial performance ==
"7AM" spent a total of ten weeks on the Bubbling Under R&B/Hip-Hop Singles chart, peaking at number five on August 6, 2016.

== Track listing ==
No.	Title	Writer(s)	Producer	Length
1.	"Safe House"	Symere Woods; Soulja Boy; Jamaal Henry	Don Cannon; Maaly Raw	3:56
2.	"Banned from TV"	Woods; Ernest Brown	Charlie Heat	6:55
3.	"Super Saiyan"	Woods; Marcus Slade	Slade Da Monsta	2:27
4.	"7AM"	Woods; Don Paschall Jr.; Elijah Johnson III; Lexus Lewis	DP Beats; Xay Scott; Lex Luger	3:40
5.	"Yamborghini Dream" (featuring Young Thug)	Woods; Jeffery Williams; Bryan Simmons; Terrell McNeal	TM88; MP808	3:48
6.	"Right Now"	Woods; Sonny Uwaezuoke	Sonny Digital	3:48
7.	"Moist"	Woods; Trocon Roberts Jr.; Ryan Vojtesak; Jamil Chammas	FKi 1st; Charlie Handsome; Digi	4:00
8.	"Top"	Woods; Cannon; Tre Cooper	Don Cannon; Treez Lowkey	3:56
9.	"Queso" (featuring Wiz Khalifa)	Woods; Simmons; Cameron Thomaz; Wesley Glass	TM88; Wheezy	3:56
10.	"All My Chains"	Woods; Slade	Slade Da Monsta	3:29
11.	"Belly"	Woods; Kenneth Smith; Bobby Turner Jr.	DJ Plugg; Bobby Kritical	3:38
12.	"Wit My Crew x 1987"	Woods; Roberts Jr.; Steven Bolden; Darius Lassiter	FKi; Chapo	6:21
13.	"Nuyork Nights at 21"	Woods; Roberts Jr.	FKi 1st	2:50
14.	"Enemies"	Woods; Henry	Maaly Raw	4:08
15.	"Ballin"	Woods; Cannon; Mack Loggins	Don Cannon; V12 The Hitman	4:38
16.	"Paradise"	Woods; Cannon	Don Cannon	2:53
Total length:				60:25

Notes

- "Moist", "Queso", "Wit My Crew x 1987" and "Nuyork Nights at 21" are not available on streaming services.
- "Ballin" is also known as "Ballin' to the End".

== Charts ==
=== Weekly charts ===
Chart (2024)	Peak position
Croatian International Albums (HDU)	33
Hungarian Physical Albums (MAHASZ)	39

== Release history ==
Region	Date	Format(s)	Label	Ref.
Worldwide	October 30, 2015	Streaming; digital download	Generation Now; Atlantic	
Worldwide	April 21, 2018	LP	Generation Now; Atlantic	
