= 1017 vs. the World =

Mixtape by Lil Uzi Vert and Gucci Mane
- Released: November 23, 2016
- Recorded: 2016
- Genres: Hip-hop; trap
- Length: 20:53
- Labels: Generation Now; GUWOP
- Producers: DP Beats; D. Rich; GLOhan Beats; Honorable C.N.O.T.E.; Mannie Fresh; Zaytoven

Lil Uzi Vert chronology
The Perfect LUV Tape (2016)	1017 vs. The World (2016)	Luv Is Rage 1.5 (2017)

Gucci Mane chronology
Free Bricks 2: Zone 6 Edition (2016)	1017 vs. The World (2016)	The Return of East Atlanta Santa (2016)

Professional ratings
Review scores
Source	Rating
HipHopDX	2.8/5
HotNewHipHop	67%
Pitchfork	6.8/10

1017 vs. the World is a collaborative mixtape by American rappers Lil Uzi Vert and Gucci Mane. It was released through Generation Now and GUWOP on November 23, 2016. The project features production by Honorable C.N.O.T.E., D. Rich, Mannie Fresh, Zaytoven, DP Beats and GLOhan Beats.

== Track listing ==
No.	Title	Writer(s)	Producer(s)	Length
1.	"Changed My Phone"	Symere Woods; Radric Davis; Carlton Mays Jr.; Dwayne Richardson	Honorable C.N.O.T.E.; D. Rich	2:57
2.	"Today" (performed by Lil Uzi Vert)	Woods; Mays Jr.	Honorable C.N.O.T.E	1:54
3.	"Blonde Brigitte"	Woods; Davis; Byron Thomas	Mannie Fresh	3:44
4.	"Threesome"	Woods; Davis; Xavier Dotson	Zaytoven	3:09
5.	"Fresh"	Woods; Davis; Dotson	Zaytoven	2:58
6.	"In 04'"	Woods; Davis; Don Paschall Jr.	DP Beats	2:51
7.	"Secure the Bag"	Woods; Davis; Nicholas Leveston	GLOhan Beats	3:21
Total length:				20:53

Notes

- "In 04'" is stylised as "IN O4'".
- "Secure the Bag" contains a sample of the "Clock Tower" level theme by Hidenori Shoji and Haruyoshi Tomita, from the video game Super Monkey Ball 2.
