= Lil Uzi Vert =

American rapper and singer (born 1994 or 1995)

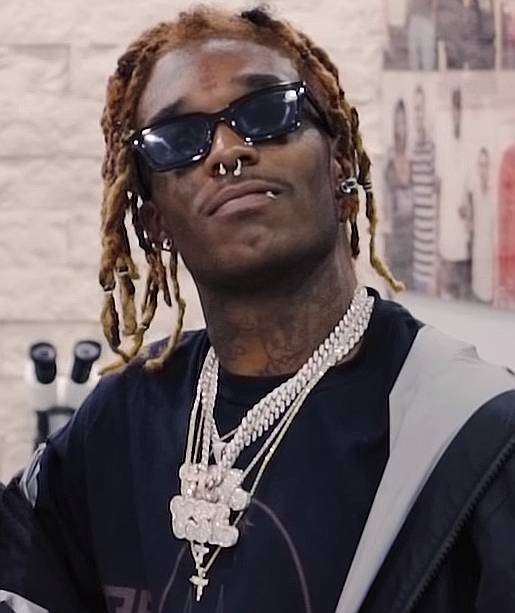
- Lil Uzi Vert in 2018

Background information
- Also known as: Orenji; Renji; Baby Pluto; Sasuke; Uzi London; Leslie Chow; Sealab Vertical; Boop
- Born: Symere Bysil Woods; July 31, 1994, or 1995 (age 31 or 32); Philadelphia, Pennsylvania, US
- Genres: Hip-hop; emo rap; trap; SoundCloud rap; punk rap; psychedelic rap; rage
- Occupations: Rapper; singer-songwriter
- Works: Discography
- Years active: 2010–present
- Labels: Generation Now; Atlantic Records; Roc Nation; Cor(e)
- Publisher: Roc Nation Publishing
- Partner: JT (2019–present)
- Website: liluziofficial.com

Logo
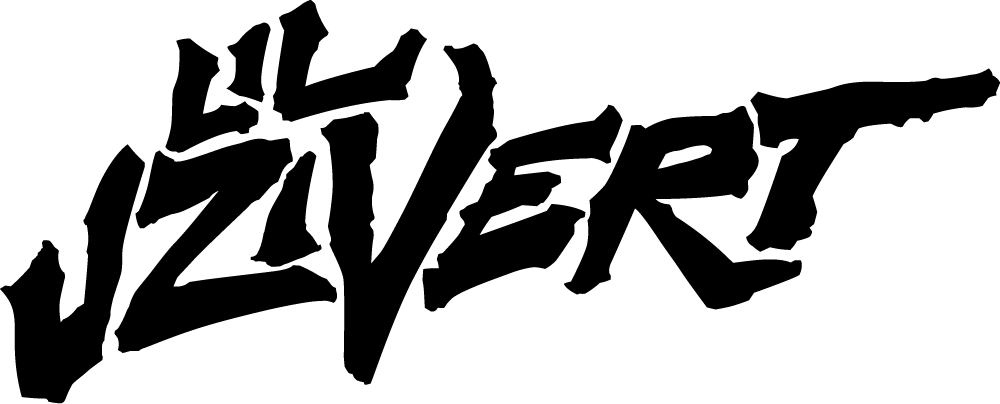

Symere Bysil Woods (/saɪˈmɪər ˈbaɪsəl/ sy-MEER BY-səl; born July 31, 1994 or 1995), known professionally as Lil Uzi Vert, is an American rapper and singer-songwriter. Known for their (Note: Lil Uzi Vert identifies as gender-nonconforming and uses they/them pronouns.) eclectic fashion style and genre-blending music, they are considered an influential figure in contemporary hip-hop. Born and raised in Philadelphia, Pennsylvania, they gained initial recognition following the release of the commercial mixtape Luv Is Rage (2015), which led to a recording contract with Atlantic Records, to whom they signed under DJ Drama's Generation Now imprint.

Lil Uzi Vert attracted mainstream attention following the release of their 2016 debut single "Money Longer". The song served as lead single for their third mixtape Lil Uzi Vert vs. the World (2016), which spawned the rapper's first Billboard Hot 100-top 40 single, "You Was Right". After releasing an additional mixtape and EP, Lil Uzi Vert guest appeared on Migos' 2016 single "Bad and Boujee", which peaked atop the chart. They later secured their first top ten single as a lead artist with their 2017 single "XO Tour Llif3", which won the MTV Video Music Award for Song of Summer.

"XO Tour Llif3" also served as lead single for Lil Uzi Vert's debut studio album Luv Is Rage 2 (2017), which debuted atop the Billboard 200 and received double platinum certification by the Recording Industry Association of America (RIAA). At the 2018 Grammy Awards, they were nominated for Best New Artist. Following several delays, their second studio album, Eternal Atake (2020), became their second project to debut atop the Billboard 200. That same year, they released Pluto × Baby Pluto (2020), a collaborative album with Future, and spent the next three years teasing their third solo album, Pink Tape (2023). Upon release, it became their third consecutive solo project to debut atop the Billboard 200, and included the Billboard Hot 100 top-ten single "Just Wanna Rock".

== Early life ==
Symere Bysil Woods was born on July 31, 1994, or 1995, in Philadelphia, Pennsylvania, and raised in the Francisville neighborhood of North Philadelphia, Pennsylvania. They grew up listening to Mike Jones and Ying Yang Twins; Jones' 2005 debut album was the first album they purchased. Woods later began listening to Wiz Khalifa and Meek Mill, who influenced their future style. They also began listening to Marilyn Manson, Paramore, Smash Mouth, the Rocket Summer, Simian, My Chemical Romance, and the All-American Rejects when they were 13 years old and K-Pop group GFriend since 2015.

Woods dropped out of school and soon started working at a Bottom Dollar store, but quit after four days and was kicked out of their home by their mother. The situation led to Woods getting their first face tattoo, the word "Faith" under their hairline, which provoked them to take their rap career seriously.

== Career ==
=== 2010–2015: Career beginnings ===
Woods began to rap in tenth grade after hearing classmate William Aston freestyle over a remade Chris Brown instrumental. Woods referred to themself at that point in their life as a "regular kid", claiming that they "didn't really want to rap" at that time. Woods, Aston, and another friend created the musical group Steaktown and in what they say was "just for money" under the name "Sealab Vertical". They later changed this name to Lil Uzi Vert inspired by the way someone described their rap "flow" as "fast, like a machine gun."

Woods' first project, an EP titled Purple Thoughtz Vol. 1 was released on January 19, 2014. The project, which was described as "phonk" and having cloud rap beats from The Guardian due to its psychedelic and "trippy" production and was released with the single "White Shit" which included a video. The track, which was produced by SpaceGhostPurrp, went viral in 2017 within hip-hop circles following Wood's entry into the mainstream. Shortly after the release of Purple Thoughtz Vol. 1, Woods caught the attention of then industry-mainstays like the ASAP Mob.

The project and following features caught the attention of producer and Def Jam A&R Don Cannon after DJ Diamond Kuts played one of Woods' songs on a local radio station, who signed Woods to their The Academy imprint and produced their first mixtape, The Real Uzi which was released on August 5, 2014. After the release of The Real Uzi, Woods signed a record deal with Atlantic Records through DJ Drama, Don Cannon's and Leighton Morrison's imprint, Generation Now.

Following their signing to Atlantic Records, Woods was featured alongside Rich the Kid and ASAP Ferg on Carnage's single "WDYW". They also released several songs on SoundCloud including the Metro Boomin produced "No Wait", "Pressure" which is a collaboration with Lil Durk and "Dej Loaf". They were featured on Fall Out Boy and Wiz Khalifa's "Boys of Zummer" tour in August 2015. Woods released their second mixtape, Luv Is Rage on October 30, 2015. The project, which features production from then-bubbling producers Sonny Digital, TM88 and Maaly Raw with features from Billboard charting rappers Wiz Khalifa and Young Thug, was received positively and was featured on numerous music blogs such as The Fader, XXL, and Vibe. They were called a "breakout artist of 2015" by HotNewHipHop.

=== 2016: Breakthrough ===
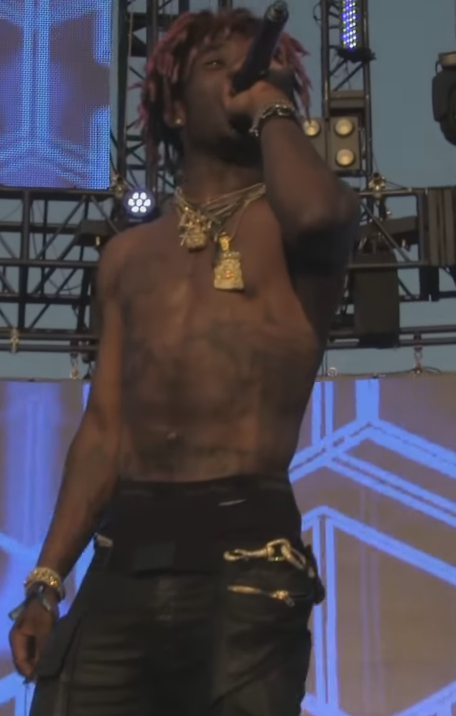
Lil Uzi Vert performing at the Hard music festival, July 31, 2016

In January 2016, Woods appeared at an ASAP Mob show in New York City to honor the deceased ASAP Yams, and in February, released the single "Money Longer" on their SoundCloud following a radio debut on Shade 45. Controversy arose in March 2016 after a riot broke out on the final day of South by Southwest during a Woods set, caused by a fight in the crowd. On April 15, 2016, Woods released their third mixtape and first commercial mixtape Lil Uzi Vert vs. the World. The mixtape debuted at number 37 on the Billboard 200 chart, making it Woods' first entry on the chart. The project spent 55 weeks on the Billboard 200 album chart, eventually being certified double platinum. Woods and Kodak Black embarked on a joint tour in May 2016, titled the "Parental Advisory" tour.

In June 2016, Lil Uzi Vert appeared in XXL magazine as part of their 2016 Freshman Class. As part of this appearance, Woods performed in a 'freshman cypher', a group of underground rappers, alongside Denzel Curry, Lil Yachty, 21 Savage, and Kodak Black. Riding the wave of recognition the XXL Freshman list gave them, Woods released the video for "Money Longer". The single debuted on the Billboard Hot 100 the following week at number 92, their first entry on the chart. The song later peaked at number 54 and is currently certified seven-times platinum in the United States. Another single from Lil Uzi Vert vs. the World, Metro Boomin produced "You Was Right", became Woods second entry on the chart, debuting at number 89 and peaking at number 40.

On July 31, 2016, Woods released their fourth mixtape, The Perfect LUV Tape. The mixtape debuted at number 55 on the Billboard 200 album chart and is certified gold by the RIAA. In October 2016, Woods was announced to be an additional artist on Canadian singer the Weeknd's tour.

Woods announced a collaboration mixtape with Gucci Mane, 1017 vs. the World, which was released on November 23, 2016. Four days later, Woods announced Luv Is Rage 2 which eventually went through a series of delays.

=== 2017: Luv Is Rage 2 ===
Woods featured on the hip-hop trio Migos' single "Bad and Boujee". The single was released on October 28, 2016, and is from the trio's second studio album, Culture (2017). In January 2017, around the time the album released, the single peaked atop the US Billboard Hot 100, becoming Woods' first number 1 single as a lead or featured artist, and their highest-charting single overall. On February 27, 2017, Woods released the EP Luv Is Rage 1.5 while on tour with the Weeknd. The EP was positively received for its "nerdy" nature, with Kingdom Hearts themed instrumentals and lyrics referring to anime, Steven Universe and hentai. The EP was also credited as the start of Woods' affiliation with the "emo rapper" label due to the heartbreak-associated lyrics on the song "Luv Scars K.o 1600" and references to threats of suicide and depression on the stand-out track "XO Tour Llif3".

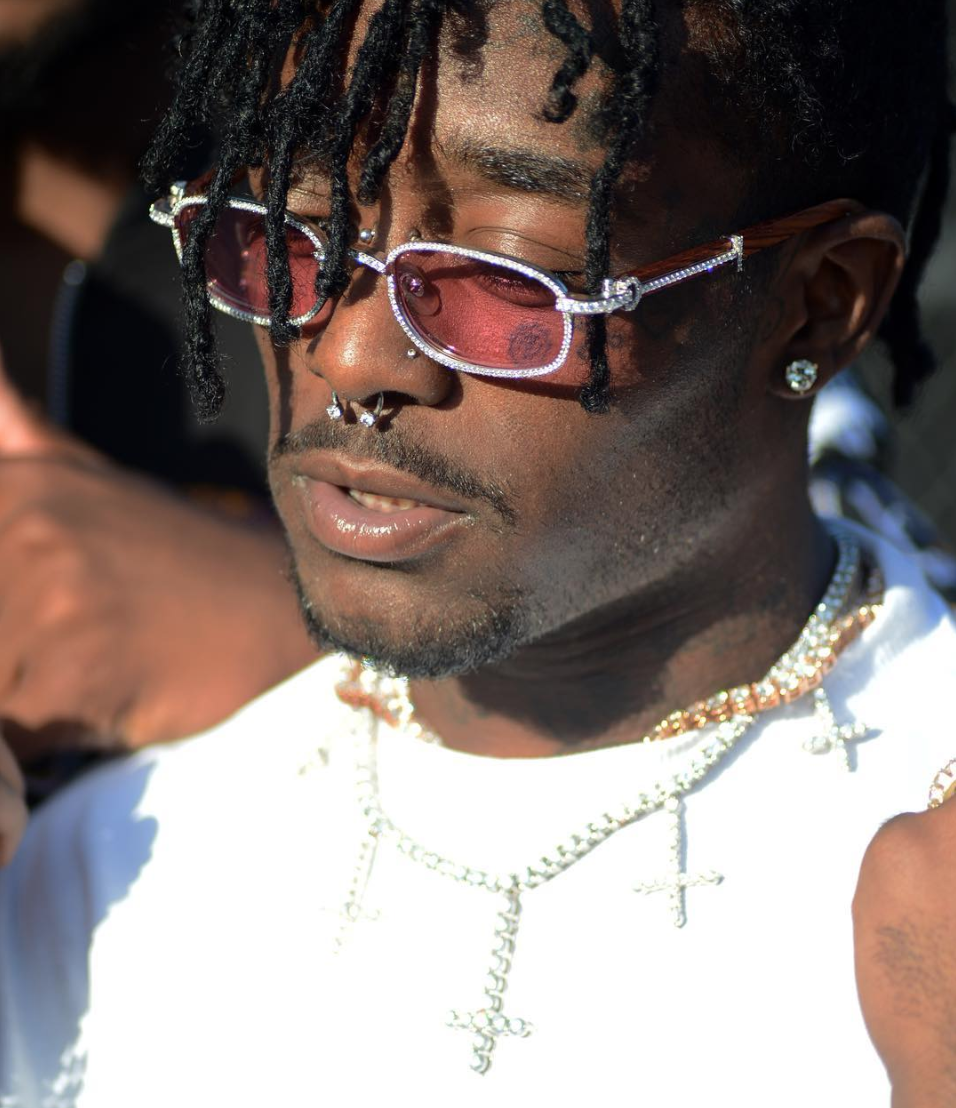
Lil Uzi Vert in 2017

"XO Tour Llif3"'s significant popularity on SoundCloud resulted in Woods playing it live on the European leg of the Weeknd's tour and was subsequently released as an official single. On April 4, 2017, "XO Tour Llif3" debuted on Billboard Hot 100 at number 49 and peaked at number seven, becoming the rapper's highest-charting song, being certified fourteen-times platinum as of December 2024.

Luv Is Rage 2 was delayed from an unspecified due date on April 2, 2017, with Woods blaming it on DJ Drama. On April 9, Don Cannon confirmed the project would not be released "any time soon" but confirmed that "XO Tour Llif3" would appear on the album. Woods was featured on fellow rapper Playboi Carti's single "Wokeuplikethis". It was released on April 7, 2017, and is from Carti's debut commercial mixtape, Playboi Carti (2017). The single was performed by the pair at Coachella 2017.

Woods was featured alongside ASAP Rocky, Playboi Carti, Quavo and Frank Ocean on ASAP Mob's single "Raf". The single was released by surprise on May 15, 2017, and is from the collective's second studio album, Cozy Tapes Vol. 2: Too Cozy. In early August, hip hop media personality DJ Akademiks claimed that Luv Is Rage 2 would release within 30 days. On August 24, 2017, Luv Is Rage 2 was announced for a surprise release at midnight and on August 25, Lil Uzi Vert released the album which included top ten single, "XO Tour Llif3" as the lead single.

"Wokeuplikethis" was eventually certified platinum and peaked at number 76 on the Billboard Hot 100. The album debuted at number one on the Billboard 200 albums chart, with 135,000 album-equivalent units and has since been certified platinum. The album also created ten Billboard Hot 100 charting tracks, with two, "The Way Life Goes", featuring Oh Wonder, and "Sauce It Up" becoming singles. During British singer Ed Sheeran's set at the Video Music Awards, Woods and Sheeran performed a medley of "XO Tour Llif3" and Sheeran's chart-topping single, "Shape Of You".

In September 2017, Woods teased a possible sequel project to Lil Uzi Vert vs. the World possibly titled Lil Uzi Vert vs. the World 2 and a collaboration project with Playboi Carti titled 16*29. In October, a joint-tour with Playboi Carti called the 16*29 Tour was announced further promoting the possibility of a collaboration project. The tour was canceled shortly thereafter due to Woods claiming they needed to "focus". In October 2017, Woods headlined Power 105.1's annual Powerhouse music celebration, alongside the Weeknd, Migos, and Cardi B, at the Barclays Center in Brooklyn, New York. Woods was also featured on Canadian rapper Nav's platinum-certified single "Wanted You". The song was released on November 9, 2017, and is from Nav's debut studio album, Reckless (2018).

On December 4, 2017, "The Way Life Goes" music video was released with a remix, featuring rapper Nicki Minaj. The song subsequently peaked at number 24 on the Billboard Hot 100. Woods performed on Stephen Colbert's The Late Show performing "The Way Life Goes" on February 6, 2018, and was later featured alongside Kanye West on Travis Scott's song, "Watch", which was released on May 3, 2018. "Watch" debuted at number 16 on the Billboard Hot 100 chart. They were also featured on a remix for fellow rapper Lil Tracy's single "Like a Farmer". Two months after "Watch", Woods' collaboration with Juice Wrld on the track "Wasted" was released July 10, 2018.

=== 2018–2020: Eternal Atake, Lil Uzi Vert vs. the World 2, and Pluto × Baby Pluto ===
In January 2018, Woods announced that they had completed a mixtape with record producer Wheezy. In May 2018, Don Cannon confirmed that their new project would be released in 2018 and speculation arose in July 2018 when Woods tweeted the words Eternal Atake, their second studio album (2020), pinning the tweet and announcing it was "coming soon" and then at the end of the month sharing the then-chosen cover art for the project. The then-chosen cover art for Eternal Atake references the logo of the cult Heaven's Gate. The two members who survived the cult suggested that legal actions could be taken against Woods for copying the logo style. The then-thought lead single from Eternal Atake, "New Patek" was released on September 18, 2018. Woods was then featured on Lil Pump's single, "Multi Millionaire". The single was released on October 5, 2018, and is from Pump's second studio album, Harverd Dropout.

In April 2019, following label trouble with Generation Now, Woods signed to Roc Nation Management. Two new promotional singles were released in April 2019, titled "Sanguine Paradise" and "That's a Rack", originally thought to be from their highly anticipated studio album, Eternal Atake. On December 13, 2019, Woods released a new single titled, "Futsal Shuffle 2020", which is the lead single of Eternal Atake. They then released the second single of the album, titled "That Way", on March 1, 2020. Eternal Atake was released on March 6, 2020, with a sole guest appearance from American singer Syd. The release date of the album was a week earlier than fans expected it to release. "New Patek", "That's a Rack" and "Sanguine Paradise" did not appear on the album. Eternal Atake debuted atop the Billboard 200.

On March 12, 2020, Woods teased that the deluxe version of Eternal Atake and the sequel to their July 2016 mixtape, Lil Uzi Vert vs. the World, titled Lil Uzi Vert vs. the World 2, would release the following day, the date fans expected the release date of the original album. The deluxe edition would have fourteen new tracks, featuring guest appearances from Chief Keef, 21 Savage, Future, Young Thug, Gunna, Lil Durk, Young Nudy and Nav. The first half of the album maintained a leading number one position (equal to 288,000 album sales in the United States) with 400 million streams in early 2020, during the COVID-19 pandemic. This marked the largest streaming count for any album since 2018 when Lil Wayne's twelfth studio album, Tha Carter V, garnered 433 million streams.

On April 24, 2020, Woods released a new single titled "Sasuke", the first since the release of the deluxe version of Eternal Atake, with a name referencing the eponymous character from Naruto. On July 21, 2020, Woods and Future hinted at an upcoming joint project titled Pluto × Baby Pluto on their social media. The two later released two new singles, "Patek" and "Over Your Head", on July 31, which was Woods' 26th birthday. Pluto × Baby Pluto was released on November 13, 2020, and peaked at number two on the Billboard 200. A deluxe version containing the two previously released singles as well as 6 new tracks was released four days later on November 17.

=== 2021–present: Red & White, Pink Tape, and Eternal Atake 2 ===
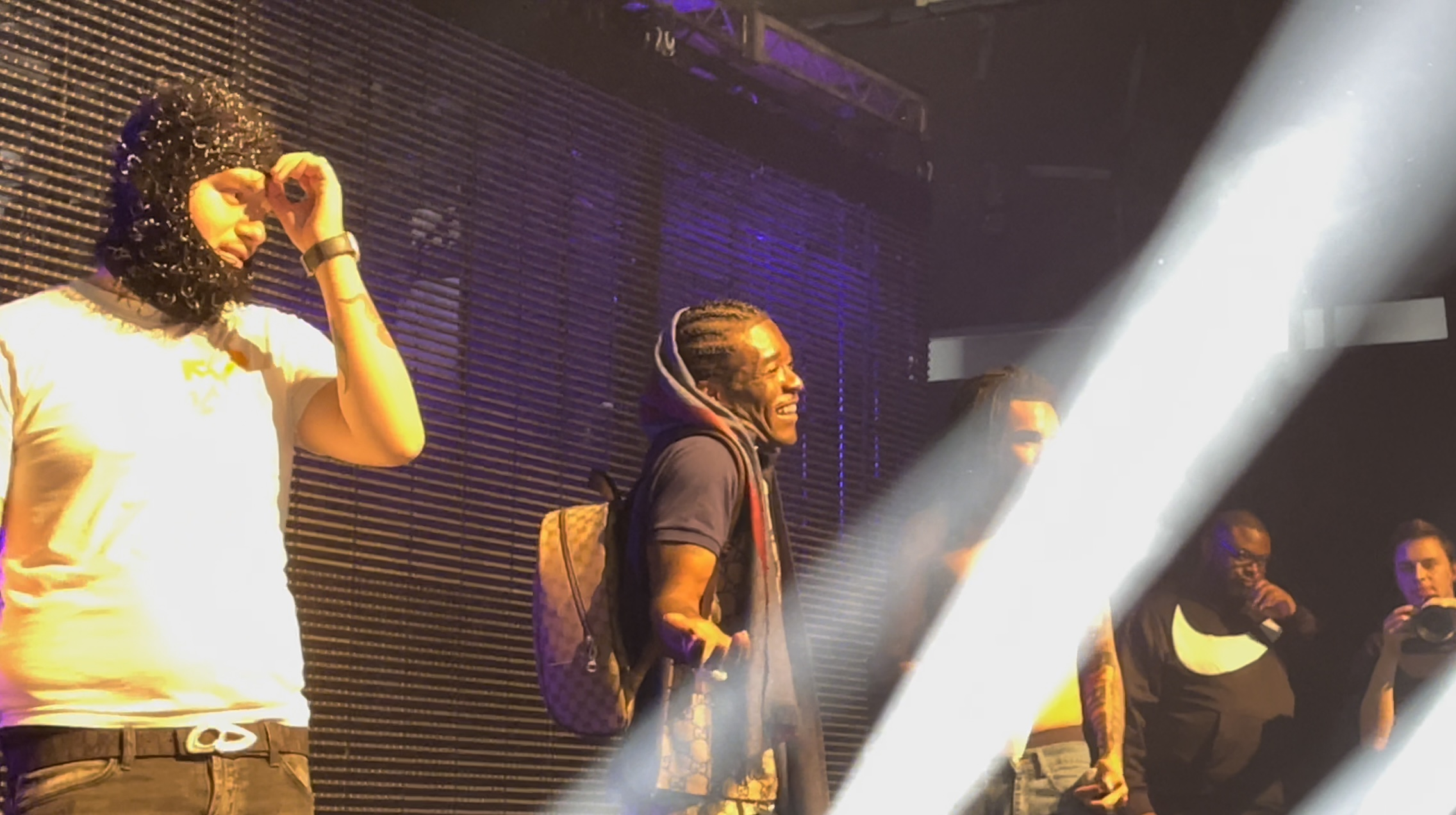
Lil Uzi Vert (second from left) performing with Yeat at The Fonda Theatre in California, May 9, 2022

In late 2020, Woods began promoting new singles on Instagram live videos that were sonically similar to popular releases early in their career. On July 16, 2021, they also announced the title of their upcoming album as The Pink Tape. Woods subsequently announced an upcoming project titled Forever Young, as well as a follow-up to Luv Is Rage 2 and a project to be released exclusively on SoundCloud. On October 29, 2021, Lil Uzi Vert released the single "Demon High".

Woods released an EP titled Red & White on July 22, 2022, with them releasing a number of highly anticipated tracks exclusively on SoundCloud in the lead-up to its release. In October 2022, they released their single "Just Wanna Rock", which had gone viral on the video-sharing app TikTok. "Just Wanna Rock", a Jersey club-inspired song with production from Synthetic and rising Jersey club producer McVertt, peaked at number 10 on the Billboard Hot 100, their highest-charting single since the release of Eternal Atake.

On June 30, 2023, Woods released their third solo studio album Pink Tape, containing 26 songs, including 3 bonus tracks. The album featured guest appearances from Travis Scott, Nicki Minaj, Bring Me the Horizon, Don Toliver and Babymetal. Pink Tape debuted at number one on the Billboard 200, making Woods just the third hip-hop artist of the 21st century, along with Drake and J. Cole, to have their first three studio albums reach the top spot on the chart. It was the first hip-hop album of 2023 to top the charts.

After the release of Pink Tape, Woods teased their fifth mixtape Barter 16, promising to release it if Pink Tape reached number one on the Billboard 200, this would be released next. On August 16, 2023, Uzi teased the artwork cover for the mixtape on Instagram, which was inspired by Young Thug's debut commercial mixtape, Barter 6 (2015). On August 19, 2023, multiple songs from Barter 16 were leaked on the internet, leading to the project being scrapped. While on a nationwide tour for Pink Tape, Woods teased an album titled Luv Is Rage 3 and suggested they would retire following the release of their fourth studio album. Woods released Eternal Atake 2 on November 1, 2024.

In November 2025, Woods signed to Roc Nation Distribution and Roc Nation Publishing, and they released the singles "Chanel Boy" and "Relevant", while also launching their own imprint, Cor(e). On July 31, 2026, Woods released a surprise EP titled Maverick "Almost Forever", which corresponded with their birthday.

== Musical style ==
Woods has been consistently been considered to be avant-garde by critics and journalists. Lil Uzi Vert has been repeatedly characterized by their facial tattoos, facial piercings, eccentric hairstyles and androgynous fashion, imagery built on a melodic approach to trap. Complex called Woods "one of those names to pay attention to in 2016", and Spin wrote "the 22-year-old has solidified [their] spot as one to watch" with their "signature rapid delivery." Noisey called them "articularly charismatic", a "natural entertainer" who is "for better or for worse, yanking people into the future." Time's Andrew Chow and Cady Lang called them an "unlikely superstar", highlighting that Woods "has rejected convention at every step of [their] young career."

Lil Uzi Vert's style of rap has been compared to rock music, as well as being labeled with the terms emo rap and punk rap. They have also been described as a lo-fi rapper and compared to rapper Lil Wayne.

=== Influences ===
Lil Uzi Vert calls Marilyn Manson their "greatest inspiration", and called the band's 1998 album Mechanical Animals their favorite. They are also a fan of the band Paramore, specifically citing frontwoman Hayley Williams as an influence. In an interview with Complex, Lil Uzi Vert cited ASAP Rocky, Pharrell Williams (with whom they collaborated on "Neon Guts"), Kanye West, Simple Plan, Young Thug, Wiz Khalifa, Lil Wayne, and the Ying Yang Twins as influences.

== Feuds ==
=== DJ Drama ===
Woods has had a long-standing stand-still with Generation Now imprint owners Don Cannon and DJ Drama over their music. Woods has insulted Don Cannon and DJ Drama over the delays to their Luv Is Rage 2 album, advised people against signing with Generation Now and referred to DJ Drama as an "old person".

=== Reese LaFlare and OG Maco ===
On April 29, 2016, Atlanta rapper OG Maco went on a rant on social media and claimed that he "paved the way" for Woods, whom he stated was "stealing [his] sauce". Maco implied there was no issue between the two, though Woods took offense to Maco mentioning fellow Atlanta rapper Reese LaFlare, with whom Woods was feuding. In August, Woods attempted to assault LaFlare at Day N Night Fest after seeing him through a security barrier, though they were stopped by security. In September, Maco and Woods resolved their feud. In January 2018, Woods punched LaFlare in the face and bragged about it on Twitter, though they later deleted the tweet.

=== Rich the Kid ===
In early 2018, Woods tweeted that they were unhappy at DJ Drama's label, Generation Now. Fellow rapper Rich the Kid replied to say that if Woods had signed to their label, Rich Forever Music, they would have never had that problem. Woods responded by stating that they would not sign to Rich's label for $20,000, implying this was the amount offered and that it was not enough. Rich then replied that it would have been worth accepting the offer either way. Things escalated with disses on social media between the two.

In March 2018, Rich the Kid released a diss track on Woods titled "Dead Friends", a play on words of Woods' catchphrase in their hit single "XO Tour Llif3". This was to be followed by Woods' track "Rich Forever", which would never see an official release. An incident occurred between the two at a Starbucks in June 2018, when Woods attempted to attack Rich but was stopped by security.

== Personal life ==
Woods was in a relationship with fashion designer Brittany Byrd from 2014 to 2017. Byrd moved from California to attend the Parsons School of Design, where she was studying when she met Woods. Woods first referenced Byrd in their song "Nuyork Nights at 21" from Luv Is Rage and later made multiple other songs about her. A popular figure among Woods' fans, she also appeared in the music video for Woods' breakout single "Money Longer". On June 26, 2017, Woods and Byrd broke up, which Woods announced with a song titled "Stole Your Luv". Since 2019, Woods has been in a relationship with JT of the hip hop duo City Girls.

In July 2022, Woods announced on Instagram that they use they/them pronouns, which was later confirmed by their spokesperson in a statement to Pitchfork. In 2023, Woods confirmed their identify as gender-nonconforming. JT refers to Woods with he/him pronouns.

In February 2021, Woods revealed that they had a 10-carat pink diamond implanted in their forehead, which they had planned to do since 2017. They acquired the diamond, whose value was reported as $24 million, from jeweler Elliot Eliantte. Woods stated that the decision was influenced by the animated series Steven Universe, of which they are a fan, and by fellow rapper Lil B, who has used decorative jewels similarly. Woods said that they "could die" if their diamond is not removed "the right way". In June 2021, they had the diamond removed from their forehead. In July, they had it reimplanted for their performance at Rolling Loud, and revealed in September that fans ripped it out while Woods was crowd surfing at that event. They did not suffer serious damage and said that they still have the diamond. They have since replaced it with a barbell piercing.

Following the 2017 death of rapper Lil Peep from an accidental fentanyl overdose, Woods announced they were quitting drugs and attempting sobriety. Also, after the 2018 murder of fellow musician XXXTentacion, Woods asked for help on social media from other rappers to build a foundation against gun violence, which would also provide for XXXTentacion's family and his future child.

Woods has spoken about being an avid fan of manga and anime. They own several cars decorated with anime characters (also known as itasha), including one with characters from K-On! and Sword Art Online. They have frequently mentioned anime throughout their discography; the song "Sasuke" is named after the character of the same name, Woods' favorite character from the Naruto franchise.

Woods is 5 ft 4 in (163 cm) tall, as mentioned in the lyrics of "Sanguine Paradise".

=== Satanism allegations ===
Woods has been accused of being a Satanist, originally by battle rapper Daylyt who claimed that Woods worshipped Satan. It has also been noted that quickly saying "Lil Uzi Vert" sounds similar to "Lucifer". In July 2018, Woods told a crowd of fans that they were "going to hell" with them.

In August 2017, Woods created controversy by adding satanic imagery to their social media accounts and saying phrases often associated with Satanism such as "666". Woods at one point had promoted Satanism on their social media, which resulted in their Instagram access being taken from them by their record label. In March 2023, Woods stated that references to Satan they make are figurative and not literal, and that they do not believe Satan exists.

== Legal issues ==
=== 2016 arrests in Atlanta and Philadelphia ===
On December 8, 2016, Woods was arrested in Atlanta for recklessly driving a dirtbike. Woods and a friend were driving a dirtbike without lights and helmets before being noticed by police. While being chased by the police, Woods fell off their dirtbike and attempted to run away on foot before being caught and held on $6,500 bond. In November 2017, the charge was resolved with Woods receiving a community service sentence.

In October 2020, Woods and several others were arrested in the streets of Philadelphia after being involved in a paintball gun fight. They were caught after sharing a video of the dispute on Instagram.

=== 2021 assault charges ===
On July 2, 2021, Woods and Saint Jhn got into a confrontation after Saint Jhn was spotted by Woods with their ex-girlfriend Brittany Byrd. The confrontation led to a physical altercation between the two which resulted in Woods flashing a gun at the two, then holding the gun to their ex-girlfriend's stomach. It was reported that no one was harmed and everybody left the scene.

On July 6, 2021, XXL reported that Woods allegedly hospitalized Byrd by punching her in the face multiple times, and that they had held a gun to her stomach. Woods and their team did not respond to the claims made by Byrd.

On February 2, 2022, TMZ reported Woods pleaded no contest in court to one count each of felony assault with a firearm and misdemeanor injury. They later accepted a plea deal for a sentence of three years of formal probation, one year of treatment for mental health and substance abuse, 52 weeks of domestic violence counseling, restitution and a 10-year criminal protective order.

== Discography ==
Studio albums

- Luv Is Rage 2 (2017)
- Eternal Atake (2020)
- Pink Tape (2023)
- Eternal Atake 2 (2024)

Collaborative albums

- Pluto × Baby Pluto (with Future) (2020)

== Awards and nominations ==
Year	Award	Nominated work	Category	Result	Ref.
2017	Billboard Music Awards	Themself	Top New Artist	Nominated	
2017	Billboard Music Awards	"Bad and Boujee" (with Migos)	Top Rap Song	Nominated	
2017	Billboard Music Awards	"Bad and Boujee" (with Migos)	Top Rap Collaboration	Nominated	
2017	MTV Video Music Awards	"Bad and Boujee" (with Migos)	Best Hip-Hop Video	Nominated	
2017	MTV Video Music Awards	"XO Tour Llif3"	Song of Summer	Won	
2018	Grammy Awards	Themself	Best New Artist	Nominated	
2018	Grammy Awards	"Bad and Boujee" (with Migos)	Best Rap Performance	Nominated	
2018	iHeartRadio Music Awards	"Bad and Boujee" (with Migos)	Hip-Hop Song of the Year	Nominated	
2018	iHeartRadio Music Awards	Themself	Best New Hip-Hop Artist	Nominated	
2018	MTV Video Music Awards	Themself	Best New Artist	Nominated	
2020	American Music Awards	Eternal Atake	Favorite Rap/Hip-Hop Album	Nominated	
2022	Grammy Awards	Justice (Triple Chucks Deluxe) (by Justin Bieber)	Album of the Year	Nominated	
2023	MTV Video Music Awards	"Just Wanna Rock"	Best Hip-Hop Video	Nominated	
2024	Grammy Awards	"Just Wanna Rock"	Best Rap Song	Nominated	
2026	Berlin Music Video Awards	"What You Saying"	Best Art Direction	Nominated	

== See also ==
- List of hip hop musicians
- Music of Philadelphia
