= Don Cannon =

American record producer and DJ

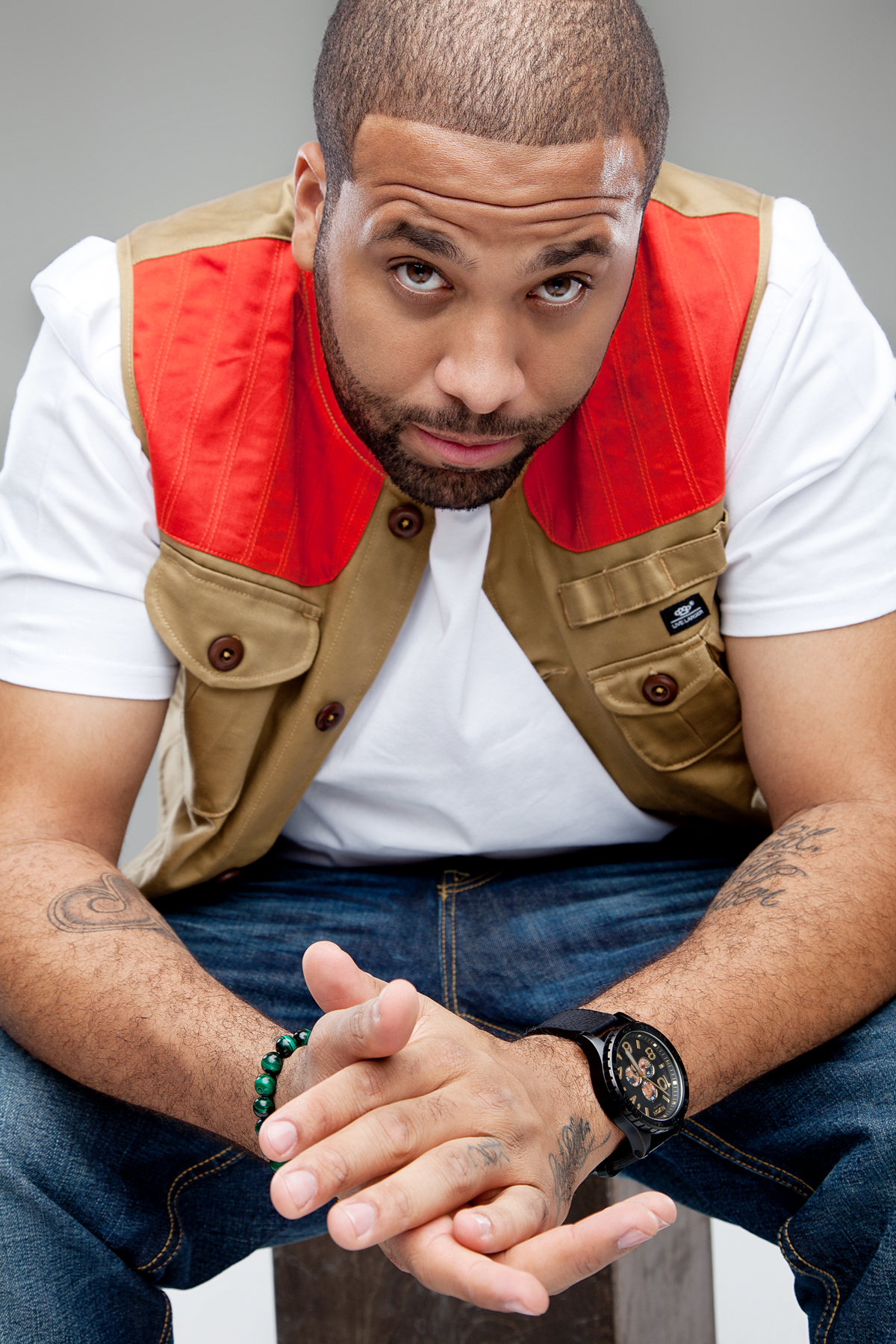
- Dj Don Cannon 2011

Background information
- Also known as: DJ Don Cannon
- Born: August 2, 1979 (age 46); Philadelphia, Pennsylvania, U.S.
- Genres: Hip hop; R&B
- Occupations: DJ; record producer; songwriter; record executive
- Years active: 2003–present
- Labels: Cannon Music; Def Jam; Atlantic; Generation Now

Donald Cannon (born August 2, 1979) is an American DJ, record producer, and record executive who served as Vice President of A&R at Def Jam Recordings from 2012 to 2018. With DJ Drama, he is the co-founder of the record label Generation Now, an imprint of Atlantic Records that has signed artists including Lil Uzi Vert and Jack Harlow. Furthermore, Cannon and DJ Drama are members of the Atlanta-based mixtape collective, Aphilliates Music Group.

As a record producer, Cannon has produced singles and albums for artists including Jeezy, Logic, Lil Uzi Vert, Lil Wayne, Ludacris, 50 Cent, and Eminem, among others.

== Early life and education ==
Cannon was born on August 2, 1979, in Philadelphia, Pennsylvania. He was raised largely in West Philadelphia. At the age of 5, he received his first set of turntables, a mixer, and a karaoke machine. By age 11, he had DJed numerous events, including his aunt's wedding reception. After high school, Cannon moved to Atlanta, Georgia to attend Clark Atlanta University. While there, he met up with other Philadelphia natives, DJ Drama and DJ Sense. The three formed the Aphilliates while in college together as a loose collection of DJs. Cannon also began DJing parties and clubs in Atlanta's inner city.

== Career ==
Cannon, along with DJ Drama and DJ Sense, officially co-founded the Aphilliates Music Group (AMG) in Atlanta in 2003. Cannon often produced tracks on DJ Drama's prominent mixtape series, Gangsta Grillz, which featured artists like Jeezy, Lil Wayne, Gucci Mane, Ludacris, Fabolous, T.I., and numerous others.

Some of Cannon's most notable early production credits with Aphilliates included Jeezy's "Go Crazy" featuring Jay-Z, 50 Cent's "Man Down," and Ludacris' "Everybody Hates Chris." Cannon also helped develop mixtape series like Lil Wayne's Dedication, T.I. and P$C's In da Streets, and Jeezy's Trap or Die. He would go on to co-host a show on Atlanta's WHTA and became a music director for the show Streets Iz Watchin on the Sirius XM Radio station, Shade 45. Good Day Atlanta, the morning show on Atlanta's Fox affiliate, also named him "Atlanta's Best DJ."

In September 2006, the Aphilliates Music Group entered into a strategic partnership with Asylum Records. In January 2007, however, Aphilliates' Atlanta offices were raided by local police at the behest of the RIAA, and Cannon and DJ Drama were arrested on RICO charges. Authorities seized 81,000 mixtapes and various pieces of recording equipment in the raid.

That raid and others like it were subject to public outcry in the aftermath, with some music industry insiders describing the RIAA and its constituent members as "schizophrenic." Aphilliates had largely operated with the express permission of major record labels at the time, because AMG helped promote their artists. Neither Cannon nor DJ Drama were ever convicted in relation to the raid.

In December 2008, Cannon announced his departure from the Aphilliates, opting to focus on his own production and promotion company, Cannon Music, LLC. In 2009, he produced the theme song for Tyler Perry's TBS sitcom, House of Payne. He also produced season themes for the Atlanta Hawks and the Atlanta Thrashers. From 2009 to 2012, Cannon produced, mixed, and/or hosted numerous mixtapes and tracks for artists like Big Sean (Finally Famous Vol. 3: Big), The Cool Kids (Gone Fishing), Curren$y (Smokee Robinson), Lecrae (Church Clothes) Jeezy (Trap or Die II), Trouble (Green Light), and Lil Reese (Don't Like; hosted with DJ Drama).

In July 2013, Cannon was named the Vice President of A&R at Def Jam Recordings. He is credited with signing and fostering numerous artists while at the label. In August 2013, Cannon reunited with DJ Drama and DJ Sense to co-found a new media collective called The academy. In September of that year, The academy announced its initial roster of 23 DJs.

In 2015, Cannon and DJ Drama founded the record label, Generation Now, as an imprint of Atlantic Records. One of the first artists they signed that year was Lil Uzi Vert. Cannon served as executive producer on Uzi's 2015 debut commercial mixtape, Luv Is Rage. He also served as executive producer on Uzi's 2017 studio album, Luv Is Rage 2, which topped the Billboard 200 chart. Other artists that Cannon and Drama have signed to the label include, Skeme, Jack Harlow, Lil James, and Killumantii.

== Recognition and awards ==
Year	Award	Category	Nominee(s)	Result	Ref.
2008	Justo Mixtape Awards	Best Mixtape Producer	Don Cannon	Won	
2008	Justo Mixtape Awards	Best Mixtape Team	The Aphilliates	Won	
2008	Justo Mixtape Awards	Best Mixtape Series	Gangsta Grillz	Won	
2018	Global Spin Awards	DJ Record Label of the Year	Don Cannon and DJ Drama (Generation Now)	Won	
