= Lil Uzi Vert discography =

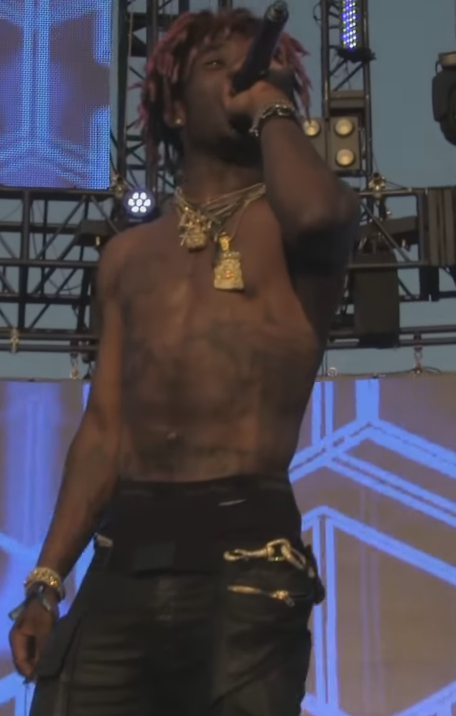
- Lil Uzi Vert performing in 2016
- Studio albums: 4
- EPs: 9
- Singles: 54
- Music videos: 15
- Mixtapes: 5

The discography of American rapper and singer Lil Uzi Vert includes four studio albums, nine extended plays (EPs), five mixtapes, and 54 singles (including 32 as a featured artist). Lil Uzi Vert first gained recognition with their commercial mixtape Luv Is Rage (2015), which led to a recording contract with Atlantic Records under DJ Drama's imprint, Generation Now. A standout track from the mixtape, "7AM", spent ten weeks on the Bubbling Under R&B/Hip-Hop Singles chart, peaking at number five as of August 6, 2016. Their breakthrough came with the release of the mixtape Lil Uzi Vert vs. the World (2019), which peaked at number 37 on the US Billboard 200 and spent a total of 55 weeks on the chart. The mixtape also reached number 18 on the US Top R&B/Hip-Hop Albums chart and was eventually certified platinum by the Recording Industry Association of America (RIAA) for combined sales and album-equivalent units of over 1,000,000 in the United States. The mixtape produced three singles: "Money Longer", "Ps and Qs", and "You Was Right", with the first two entering the US Billboard Hot 100. Both "Money Longer" and "You Was Right" have been certified double platinum by the Recording Industry Association of America (RIAA). According to a 2017 Billboard profile by Steven J. Horowitz, Lil Uzi Vert drew early attention for his genre-defying style, energetic live performances, and social-media influence, with tracks like “Money Longer” and his 1017 vs. the World collaboration achieving tens of millions of streams.Their fourth mixtape, The Perfect LUV Tape (2016), debuted at number 55 on the US Billboard 200. In February 2018, the mixtape was certified gold by the Recording Industry Association of America (RIAA), signifying combined sales and album-equivalent units of 500,000. Lil Uzi Vert also released a collaborative mixtape with Gucci Mane titled 1017 vs. the World (2016).

In early 2017, Lil Uzi Vert released the EP Luv Is Rage 1.5, featuring the hit single "XO Tour Llif3". The single peaked at number 7 on the US Billboard Hot 100 and number 5 on the US Hot R&B/Hip-Hop Songs chart. It has since been certified diamond by the Recording Industry Association of America (RIAA) for selling over 14 million units, making it one of the best-selling singles in the United States. Their debut studio album, Luv Is Rage 2 (2017), debuted at number one on the US Billboard 200 with 135,000 album-equivalent units, including 28,000 in pure album sales. The album remained popular, moving an additional 73,000 units in its second week, bringing total sales to 208,000. On March 19, 2019, Luv Is Rage 2 was certified double platinum by the Recording Industry Association of America (RIAA).

Lil Uzi Vert's second studio album, Eternal Atake (2020), debuted atop the US Billboard 200 with 288,000 album-equivalent units, including 9,000 in pure album sales. Supported by singles "Futsal Shuffle 2020" and "That Way," the album was certified platinum by the Recording Industry Association of America (RIAA). A week later, they released a deluxe edition titled Lil Uzi Vert vs. the World 2, which also debuted at number one on the Billboard 200, earning 247,000 album-equivalent units in its first week. The deluxe edition's release helped the original album maintain its number-one position on the Billboard 200 for a second consecutive week. In November 2020, Lil Uzi Vert collaborated with rapper Future on the studio album Pluto × Baby Pluto, which debuted at number two on the US Billboard 200, with 105,000 album-equivalent units, including 5,500 in pure album sales.

Lil Uzi Vert's third EP, Red & White (2022), debuted at number 23 on the US Billboard 200, earning 20,000 album-equivalent units in its first week. Their third studio album, Pink Tape (2023), debuted at number one on the Billboard 200, with 167,000 album-equivalent units, consisting of 11,000 album sales and 154,000 streaming units. The album was supported by the singles "Just Wanna Rock" and "Endless Fashion". In late 2025, after completing their deal with Atlantic Records, Lil Uzi Vert began releasing music independently through Roc Nation Distribution, issuing the singles "Chanel Boy" and "Relevant" as their first releases under the new partnership.

== Albums ==
=== Studio albums ===
List of studio albums, with selected chart positions, sales figures and certifications
Title	Album details	Peak chart positions										Sales	Certifications
Title	Album details	US	US R&B /HH	AUS	CAN	ITA	NLD	NOR	NZ	SWE	UK	Sales	Certifications
Luv Is Rage 2	Released: August 25, 2017; Label: Generation Now, Atlantic; Format: CD, LP, cassette, digital download	1	1	22	3	27	13	9	10	15	14	US: 135,000	RIAA: 5× Platinum; BPI: Gold
Eternal Atake	Released: March 6, 2020; Label: Generation Now, Atlantic; Format: CD, LP, streaming, digital download	1	1	1	1	8	2	2	2	5	3	US: 247,000	RIAA: 3× Platinum; BPI: Gold; MC: 2× Platinum; RMNZ: Gold
Pink Tape	Released: June 30, 2023; Label: Generation Now, Atlantic; Format: CD, LP, streaming, digital download	1	1	7	2	19	3	3	1	41	7	US: 154,000	RIAA: Platinum; MC: Platinum
Eternal Atake 2	Released: November 1, 2024; Label: Generation Now, Atlantic; Format: CD, LP, digital download, streaming	3	2	71	11	—	49	—	19	—	47	US: 59,000	
"—" denotes a recording that did not chart or was not released in that territory.

=== Collaborative albums ===
List of collaborative studio albums, with selected chart positions, sales figures and certifications
Title	Album details	Peak chart positions										Certifications
Title	Album details	US	US R&B /HH	BEL	CAN	ITA	NLD	NOR	NZ	SWE	UK	Certifications
Pluto × Baby Pluto (with Future)	Released: November 13, 2020; Label: Epic, Freebandz, Generation Now, Atlantic; Format: Streaming, digital download	2	1	34	5	61	26	20	29	49	39	MC: Gold

=== Reissues ===
List of albums, with date released
Title	Album details	Peak chart positions	
Title	Album details	NOR	SWE
Lil Uzi Vert vs. the World 2 (Note: Lil Uzi Vert vs. the World 2 is also called Eternal Atake (Deluxe) – LUV vs. the World 2.)	Released: March 13, 2020; Label: Generation Now, Atlantic; Format: CD, LP, Streaming, digital download	2	36

== Mixtapes ==
List of mixtapes, with date released and peak chart positions
Title	Mixtape details	Peak chart positions			Certifications
Title	Mixtape details	US	US R&B /HH	US Rap	Certifications
The Real Uzi	Released: August 5, 2014; Label: Self-released; Format: digital download	—	—	—	—
Luv Is Rage	Released: October 30, 2015; Label: Generation Now, Atlantic; Format: LP, streaming, digital download	—	—	—	—
Lil Uzi Vert vs. the World	Released: April 15, 2016; Label: Generation Now, Atlantic; Format: LP, streaming, digital download	37	18	12	RIAA: 2× Platinum
The Perfect LUV Tape	Released: July 31, 2016; Label: Generation Now, Atlantic; Format: LP, streaming, digital download	55	20	12	RIAA: Platinum
1017 vs. the World (with Gucci Mane)	Released: November 23, 2016; Label: Generation Now, GUWOP; Format: Digital download	—	—	—	—

== EPs ==
=== Studio EPs ===
List of EPs, with selected details
Title	EP details	Peak chart positions		
Title	EP details	US	US R&B /HH	CAN
Purple Thoughtz EP Vol. 1	Released: January 19, 2014; Label: Self-released; Format: Digital download	—	—	—
Luv Is Rage 1.5	Released: February 26, 2017; Label: Self-released; Format: Streaming	—	—	—
Red & White	Released: July 22, 2022; Label: Generation Now, Atlantic; Format: CD, LP, streaming	23	13	55
Maverick "Almost Forever" EP	Released: July 31, 2026; Label: Cor(e), Roc Nation; Format: Streaming	25	8	—

=== Compilation EPs ===
List of EPs, with selected details
Title	EP details
Pink Tape: Level 1	Released: August 4, 2023; Label: Warner Music Group, X5 Music Group; Format: Streaming, digital download
Pink Tape: Level 2	Released: August 25, 2023; Label: Warner Music Group, X5 Music Group; Format: Streaming, digital download
Pink Tape: Level 3	Released: September 1, 2023; Label: Warner Music Group, X5 Music Group; Format: Streaming, digital download
Pink Tape: Level 4	Released: September 8, 2023; Label: Warner Music Group, X5 Music Group; Format: Streaming, digital download
Pink Tape: Boss Battle	Released: September 15, 2023; Label: Warner Music Group, X5 Music Group; Format: Streaming, digital download

== Singles ==
=== As lead artist ===
List of singles, with showing year released, peak chart positions and album name
Title	Year	Peak chart positions										Certifications	Album
Title	Year	US	US R&B/HH	US Rap	AUS	CAN	FRA	IRE	NZ	UK	WW	Certifications	Album
"Count Dem Rolls" (featuring Uzi Gang)	2014	—	—	—	—	—	—	—	—	—	—		Non-album single
"Money Longer"	2016	54	15	9	—	—	—	—	—	—	—	RIAA: 7× Platinum; BPI: Silver; RMNZ: Platinum	Lil Uzi Vert vs. the World
"You Was Right"	2016	40	16	11	—	—	—	—	—	—	—	RIAA: 5× Platinum; BPI: Silver; RMNZ: Gold	Lil Uzi Vert vs. the World
"Go Off" (with Quavo and Travis Scott)	2017	— (Note: "Go Off" did not enter the Billboard Hot 100, but peaked at number seven on the Bubbling Under Hot 100 Singles chart.)	39	—	—	—	—	—	—	—	—	RIAA: Platinum	The Fate of the Furious: The Album
"XO Tour Llif3"	2017	7	5	4	37	10	87	45	16	25	—	RIAA: 14× Platinum; ARIA: 3× Platinum; BPI: 3× Platinum; BVMI: Platinum; RMNZ: 6× Platinum; SNEP: Platinum	Luv Is Rage 2
"The Way Life Goes" (featuring Oh Wonder or remix featuring Nicki Minaj)	2017	24	11	11	85	44	—	—	— (Note: "The Way Life Goes" did not enter the NZ Top 40 Singles Chart, but peaked at number four on the NZ Heatseeker Singles Chart.)	87	—	RIAA: 9× Platinum; BPI: Gold; RMNZ: 4× Platinum	Luv Is Rage 2
"Sauce It Up"	2018	49	21	15	—	82	—	—	—	—	—	RIAA: 4× Platinum; RMNZ: Gold	Luv Is Rage 2
"New Patek"	2018	24	14	12	—	30	—	76	— (Note: "New Patek" did not enter the NZ Top 40 Singles Chart, but peaked at number six on the NZ Hot Singles Chart.)	68	—	RIAA: Platinum; RMNZ: Gold	Non-album singles
"Free Uzi"	2019	—	—	—	—	—	—	—	—	—	—		Non-album singles
"That's a Rack"	2019	76	27	—	—	77	—	—	— (Note: "That's a Rack" did not enter the NZ Top 40 Singles Chart, but peaked at number 18 on the NZ Hot Singles Chart.)	—	—	RIAA: Gold	Non-album singles
"Sanguine Paradise"	2019	28	12	10	—	36	70	—	— (Note: "Sanguine Paradise" did not enter the NZ Top 40 Singles Chart, but peaked at number 11 on the NZ Hot Singles Chart.)	—	—	RIAA: 4× Platinum; BPI: Silver; RMNZ: Gold	Non-album singles
"Futsal Shuffle 2020"	2019	5	2	2	62	8	—	36	— (Note: "Futsal Shuffle 2020" did not enter the NZ Top 40 Singles Chart, but peaked at number four on the NZ Hot Singles Chart.)	57	—	RIAA: 2× Platinum; MC: 2× Platinum; RMNZ: Gold	Eternal Atake
"That Way"	2020	20	11	7	53	27	—	41	38	47	—	RIAA: 2× Platinum; MC: Platinum; RMNZ: Gold	Eternal Atake
"Sasuke"	2020	65	29	24	—	79	—	—	— (Note: "Sasuke" did not enter the NZ Top 40 Singles Chart, but peaked at number ten on the NZ Hot Singles Chart.)	—	—		Non-album single
"Party Girl" (remix) (with StaySolidRocky)	2020	—	—	—	—	—	—	—	— (Note: "Party Girl" (remix) did not enter the NZ Top 40 Singles Chart, but peaked at number twelve on the NZ Hot Singles Chart.)	—	—		Fallin
"Over Your Head" (with Future)	2020	— (Note: "Over Your Head" did not enter the Billboard Hot 100, but peaked at number one on the Bubbling Under Hot 100 chart.)	41	—	—	91	—	—	—	—	—		Pluto × Baby Pluto
"Patek" (with Future)	2020	— (Note: "Patek" did not enter the Billboard Hot 100, but peaked at number two on the Bubbling Under Hot 100 chart.)	43	—	—	—	—	—	—	—	—	MC: Gold	Pluto × Baby Pluto
"Dolly" (with Lil Tecca)	2020	80	26	25	—	63	—	—	— (Note: "Dolly" did not enter the NZ Top 40 Singles Chart, but peaked at number 15 on the NZ Hot Singles Chart.)	—	132		Virgo World
"His & Hers" (with Internet Money and Don Toliver featuring Gunna)	2021	67	34	—	—	53	—	—	— (Note: "His & Hers" did not enter the NZ Top 40 Singles Chart, but peaked at number nine on the NZ Hot Singles Chart.)	—	74	RIAA: Gold; RMNZ: Gold	Non-album singles
"Demon High"	2021	61	18	13	—	87	—	—	— (Note: "Demon High" did not enter the NZ Top 40 Singles Chart, but peaked at number 20 on the NZ Hot Singles Chart.)	—	121		Non-album singles
"Heavy" (with Nigo)	2022	— (Note: "Heavy" did not enter the Billboard Hot 100, but peaked at number 14 on the Bubbling Under Hot 100 chart.)	—	—	—	—	—	—	— (Note: "Heavy" did not enter the NZ Top 40 Singles Chart, but peaked at number 23 on the NZ Hot Singles Chart.)	—	—		I Know Nigo!
"Just Wanna Rock"	2022	10	5	1	39	20	—	23	36	30	26	RIAA: 4× Platinum; ARIA: Platinum; BPI: Gold; MC: 3× Platinum; RMNZ: Platinum	Pink Tape
"I'm Not Human" (with XXXTentacion)	2023	—	—	—	—	—	—	—	— (Note: "I'm Not Human" did not enter the NZ Top 40 Singles Chart, but peaked at number 21 on the NZ Hot Singles Chart.)	—	—		Non-album singles
"Watch This" (ArizonaTears pluggnb remix) (with ArizonaTears)	2023	56	19	9	—	41	—	53	38	69	75	RIAA: Platinum; BPI: Silver; RMNZ: Platinum	Non-album singles
"Blood Moon" (with Mike Will Made It)	2023	—	—	—	—	—	—	—	—	—	—		Non-album singles
"Endless Fashion" (featuring Nicki Minaj)	2023	20	9	5	—	39	—	—	— (Note: "Endless Fashion" did not enter the NZ Top 40 Singles Chart, but peaked at number 3 on the NZ Hot Singles Chart.)	75	33		Pink Tape
"NFL"	2023	—	—	—	—	—	—	—	—	—	—		Non-album singles
"Red Moon"	2023	— (Note: "Red Moon" did not enter the Billboard Hot 100, but peaked at number 17 on the Bubbling Under Hot 100 chart.)	39	—	—	—	—	—	—	—	—		Non-album singles
"Chanel Boy"	2025	—	43	—	—	—	—	—	—	—	—		Non-album singles
"Relevant"	2025	—	45	—	—	—	—	—	—	—	—		Non-album singles
"Regular"	2025	—	—	—	—	—	—	—	—	—	—		Non-album singles
"What You Saying"	2025	12	3	1	63	18	—	34	— (Note: "What You Saying" did not enter the NZ Top 40 Singles Chart, but peaked at number 6 on the NZ Hot Singles Chart.)	27	18	RIAA: Platinum	Non-album singles
"—" denotes a recording that did not chart or was not released in that territory.

=== As featured artist ===
Title	Year	Peak chart positions										Certifications	Album
Title	Year	US	US R&B/HH	US Rap	AUS	CAN	FRA	IRE	NZ	UK	WW	Certifications	Album
"WDYW" (Carnage featuring Lil Uzi Vert, ASAP Ferg and Rich the Kid)	2015	—	—	—	—	—	—	—	—	—	—	RIAA: Gold	Papi Gordo
"Wrong" (MAX featuring Lil Uzi Vert)	2015	—	—	—	—	—	—	—	—	—	—		Hell's Kitchen Angel
"Pull Up" (Wiz Khalifa featuring Lil Uzi Vert)	2016	— (Note: "Pull Up" did not enter the US Billboard Hot 100, but peaked at number 20 on the Bubbling Under Hot 100 Singles chart.)	49	—	—	—	—	—	—	—	—	RIAA: Gold	Non-album single
"Too Much Sauce" (DJ Esco featuring Future and Lil Uzi Vert)	2016	50	22	17	—	—	—	—	—	—	—	RIAA: Platinum	Project E.T.
"Drop" (Tayyib Ali featuring ASAP Ant and Lil Uzi Vert)	2016	—	—	—	—	—	—	—	—	—	—		Non-album singles
"Love" (Felix Snow featuring Lil Uzi Vert)	2016	—	—	—	—	—	—	—	—	—	—		Non-album singles
"Bad and Boujee" (Migos featuring Lil Uzi Vert)	2016	1	1	1	34	5	77	40	17	30	—	RIAA: 4× Platinum; ARIA: 2× Platinum; BPI: Platinum; BVMI: Gold; RMNZ: 3× Platinum; SNEP: Platinum	Culture
"Goyard Bag" (Fabolous featuring Lil Uzi Vert)	2017	—	—	—	—	—	—	—	—	—	—		Summertime Shootout 3: The Level Up
"Lookin" (Playboi Carti featuring Lil Uzi Vert)	2017	—	—	—	—	—	—	—	—	—	—	RIAA: Gold	Playboi Carti
"Wokeuplikethis" (Playboi Carti featuring Lil Uzi Vert)	2017	76	32	25	—	—	—	—	—	—	—	RIAA: 2× Platinum; BPI: Silver; RMNZ: Platinum; MC: Gold	Playboi Carti
"Raf" (ASAP Mob featuring ASAP Rocky, Playboi Carti, Quavo, Lil Uzi Vert and Frank Ocean)	2017	—	— (Note: "RAF" did not enter the Hot R&B/Hip-Hop Songs chart, but peaked at number ten on the Bubbling Under R&B/Hip-Hop Singles chart.)	—	—	82	—	—	— (Note: "RAF" did not enter the NZ Top 40 Singles Chart, but peaked at number five on the NZ Heatseekers Singles Chart.)	—	—	RIAA: Platinum; ARIA: Gold; RMNZ: Gold	Cozy Tapes Vol. 2: Too Cozy
"Water Leak" (Philthy Rich featuring Lil Uzi Vert, Sauce Walka and Offset)	2017	—	—	—	—	—	—	—	—	—	—		Non-album single
"Wanted You" (Nav featuring Lil Uzi Vert)	2017	64	27	23	—	33	—	—	—	—	—	RIAA: 2× Platinum; MC: 3× Platinum; RMNZ: Gold	Reckless
"Watch" (Travis Scott featuring Lil Uzi Vert and Kanye West)	2018	16	9	8	65	24	—	—	— (Note: "Watch" did not enter the NZ Top 40 Singles Chart, but peaked at number two on the NZ Heatseeker Singles Chart.)	53	—	RIAA: Platinum; RMNZ: Gold	Non-album single
"Wasted" (Juice Wrld featuring Lil Uzi Vert)	2018	67	27	21	—	69	—	—	— (Note: "Wasted" did not enter the NZ Top 40 Singles Chart, but peaked at number seventeen on the NZ Hot Singles Chart.)	—	—	RIAA: 3× Platinum; ARIA: Gold; BPI: Silver; MC: 3× Platinum; RMNZ: Platinum	Goodbye & Good Riddance
"Multi Millionaire" (Lil Pump featuring Lil Uzi Vert)	2018	—	—	—	—	99	—	—	— (Note: "Multi Millionaire" did not enter the NZ Top 40 Singles Chart, but peaked at number twenty eight on the NZ Hot Singles Chart.)	—	—		Harverd Dropout
"Big Racks" (Cassius Jay featuring Lil Uzi Vert)	2018	—	—	—	—	—	—	—	—	—	—		Non-album singles
"420 In London" (Pressa featuring Lil Uzi Vert)	2018	—	—	—	—	—	—	—	—	—	—	MC: Gold	Non-album singles
"Show You Off" (Lud Foe featuring Lil Uzi Vert)	2019	—	—	—	—	—	—	—	—	—	—		Guns Up Funds Up
"Extendo" (Young Nudy featuring Lil Uzi Vert)	2019	—	—	—	—	—	—	—	—	—	—		Sli'merre
"Pull Up" (Lil Keed featuring YNW Melly and Lil Uzi Vert)	2019	—	—	—	—	—	—	—	—	—	—		Long Live Mexico
"Reply" (A Boogie wit da Hoodie featuring Lil Uzi Vert)	2019	49	22	17	—	54	—	—	— (Note: "Reply" did not enter the NZ Top 40 Singles Chart, but peaked at number 23 on the NZ Hot Singles Chart.)	—	—	RIAA: Gold; MC: Gold	Artist 2.0
"Flood My Wrist" (A Boogie wit da Hoodie featuring Lil Uzi Vert and Don Q)	2020	— (Note: "Flood My Wrist" did not enter the Billboard Hot 100, but peaked at number 9 on the Bubbling Under Hot 100 Singles chart.)	—	—	—	—	—	—	—	—	—		Highbridge the Label: Vol. 2
"Diamond Choker" (Lil Gnar featuring Lil Uzi Vert)	2020	—	—	—	—	—	—	—	—	—	—		Die Bout It
"Adderall (Corvette Corvette)" (remix) (Popp Hunna featuring Lil Uzi Vert)	2020	— (Note: "The original version of Adderall (Corvette Corvette) peaked at 74")	—	—	—	—	—	—	—	—	—		Mud Baby
"Low Key" (Doe Boy featuring Lil Uzi Vert)	2021	—	—	—	—	—	—	—	—	—	—		Non-album single
"Die for a Man" (Bebe Rexha featuring Lil Uzi Vert)	2021	—	—	—	—	—	—	—	— (Note: "Die for a Man" did not enter the NZ Top 40 Singles Chart, but peaked at number 39 on the NZ Hot Singles Chart.)	—	—		Better Mistakes
"Teenage Dream 2" (Kidd G featuring Lil Uzi Vert)	2021	—	—	—	—	—	—	—	— (Note: "Teenage Dream 2" did not enter the NZ Top 40 Singles Chart, but peaked at number 37 on the NZ Hot Singles Chart.)	—	—		Non-album single
"Holy Smokes" (Trippie Redd featuring Lil Uzi Vert)	2021	50	17	13	—	65	—	—	— (Note: "Holy Smokes" did not enter the NZ Top 40 Singles Chart, but peaked at number 9 on the NZ Hot Singles Chart.)	—	72		Trip at Knight
"Blue Notes 2" (Meek Mill featuring Lil Uzi Vert)	2021	87	45	―	—	―	—	—	—	—	147		Expensive Pain
"V12" (Iann Dior featuring Lil Uzi Vert)	2021	— (Note: "V12" did not enter the US Billboard Hot 100, but peaked at number 20 on the Bubbling Under Hot 100 Singles chart.)	—	—	—	—	—	—	22	—	—		On to Better Things
"Bbycakes" (Mura Masa featuring Lil Uzi Vert, PinkPantheress and Shygirl)	2022	—	—	—	—	—	—	—	— (Note: "Baby Cakes" did not enter the NZ Top 40 Singles Chart, but peaked at number 24 on the NZ Hot Singles Chart.)	71	—		Soundtrack to a Death, Part 2
"Scrape It Off" (Pusha T featuring Lil Uzi Vert and Don Toliver)	2022	59	17	14	—	41	—	—	— (Note: "Scrape It Off" did not enter the NZ Top 40 Singles Chart, but peaked at number 37 on the NZ Hot Singles Chart.)	—	80		It's Almost Dry
"Amen!" (Bring Me the Horizon featuring Lil Uzi Vert and Daryl Palumbo of Glassjaw)	2023	—	—	—	—	—	—	—	— (Note: "Amen!" did not enter the NZ Top 40 Singles Chart, but peaked at number 35 on the NZ Hot Singles Chart.)	—	—		Post Human: Nex Gen
"Supposed to Be Loved" (DJ Khaled, Lil Baby and Future featuring Lil Uzi Vert)	2023	52	15	13	—	—	—	—	— (Note: "Supposed to Be Loved" did not enter the NZ Top 40 Singles Chart, but peaked at number 15 on the NZ Hot Singles Chart.)	—	—		Til Next Time
"Everybody" (Nicki Minaj featuring Lil Uzi Vert)	2024	24	5	3	—	46	—	—	4	26	45	RMNZ: Gold	Pink Friday 2
"—" denotes a recording that did not chart or was not released in that territory.

== Other charted songs ==
Title	Year	Peak chart positions										Certifications	Album
Title	Year	US	US R&B/HH	US Rap	AUS	CAN	NLD	IRE	NZ Hot	UK	WW	Certifications	Album
"7AM"	2015	—	— (Note: "7AM" did not enter the Hot R&B/Hip-Hop Songs chart, but peaked at number five on the Bubbling Under R&B/Hip-Hop Singles chart.)	—	—	—	—	—	—	—	—		Luv Is Rage
"Ps & Qs"	2016	— (Note: "Ps & Qs" did not enter the Billboard Hot 100, but peaked at number 11 on the Bubbling Under Hot 100 Singles chart.)	50	—	—	—	—	—	—	—	—	RIAA: 2× Platinum	Lil Uzi Vert vs. the World
"Do What I Want"	2016	— (Note: "Do What I Want" did not enter the Billboard Hot 100, but peaked at number one on the Bubbling Under Hot 100 Singles chart.)	— (Note: "Do What I Want" did not enter the Hot R&B/Hip-Hop Songs chart, but peaked at number one on the Bubbling Under R&B/Hip-Hop Singles chart.)	—	—	95	—	—	—	—	—	RIAA: 3× Platinum	The Perfect LUV Tape
"Erase Your Social"	2016	— (Note: "Erase Your Social" did not enter the Billboard Hot 100, but peaked at number 17 on the Bubbling Under Hot 100 chart.)	50	—	—	—	—	—	—	—	—	BPI: Silver; RMNZ: Gold	The Perfect LUV Tape
"Seven Million" (Lil Uzi Vert featuring Future)	2016	—	— (Note: "Seven Million" did not enter the Hot R&B/Hip-Hop Songs chart, but peaked at number four on the Bubbling Under R&B/Hip-Hop Singles chart.)	—	—	—	—	—	—	—	—		The Perfect LUV Tape
"Froze" (Meek Mill featuring Lil Uzi Vert and Nicki Minaj)	2016	68	28	21	—	—	—	—	—	—	—		DC4
"ASAP Ferg" (Nav and Metro Boomin featuring Lil Uzi Vert)	2017	—	—	—	—	88	—	—	—	—	—		Perfect Timing
"Two"	2017	80	39	—	—	—	—	—	—	—	—	RIAA: Platinum	Luv Is Rage 2
"444+222"	2017	60	30	23	—	91	—	—	—	—	—	RIAA: Platinum	Luv Is Rage 2
"No Sleep Leak"	2017	90	45	—	—	—	—	—	—	—	—	RIAA: Gold	Luv Is Rage 2
"For Real"	2017	82	41	—	—	—	—	—	—	—	—	RIAA: Gold	Luv Is Rage 2
"Feelings Mutual"	2017	— (Note: "Feelings Mutual" did not enter the Billboard Hot 100, but peaked at number eight on the Bubbling Under Hot 100 Singles chart.)	— (Note: "Feelings Mutual" did not enter the Hot R&B/Hip-Hop Songs chart, but peaked at number three on the Bubbling Under R&B/Hip-Hop Singles chart.)	—	—	—	—	—	—	—	—		Luv Is Rage 2
"Neon Guts" (featuring Pharrell Williams)	2017	79	38	—	—	—	—	—	—	—	—	RIAA: 2× Platinum; RMNZ: Gold	Luv Is Rage 2
"Early 20 Rager"	2017	— (Note: "Early 20 Rager" did not enter the Billboard Hot 100, but peaked at number 15 on the Bubbling Under Hot 100 Singles chart.)	— (Note: "Early 20 Rager" did not enter the Hot R&B/Hip-Hop Songs chart, but peaked at number eight on the Bubbling Under R&B/Hip-Hop Singles chart.)	—	—	—	—	—	—	—	—		Luv Is Rage 2
"UnFazed" (featuring the Weeknd)	2017	84	42	—	—	71	—	—	—	—	—	RIAA: Platinum	Luv Is Rage 2
"Pretty Mami"	2017	— (Note: "Pretty Mami" did not enter the Billboard Hot 100, but peaked at number two on the Bubbling Under Hot 100 Singles chart.)	— (Note: "Pretty Mami" did not enter the Hot R&B/Hip-Hop Songs chart, but peaked at number one on the Bubbling Under R&B/Hip-Hop Singles chart.)	—	—	—	—	—	—	—	—		Luv Is Rage 2
"How to Talk"	2017	— (Note: "How to Talk" did not enter the Billboard Hot 100, but peaked at number 11 on the Bubbling Under Hot 100 Singles chart.)	— (Note: "How to Talk" did not enter the Hot R&B/Hip-Hop Songs chart, but peaked at number six on the Bubbling Under R&B/Hip-Hop Singles chart.)	—	—	—	—	—	—	—	—		Luv Is Rage 2
"X"	2017	81	39	—	—	—	—	—	—	—	—	RIAA: Gold	Luv Is Rage 2
"Malfunction"	2017	— (Note: "Malfunction" did not enter the Billboard Hot 100, but peaked at number 24 on the Bubbling Under Hot 100 Singles chart.)	—	—	—	—	—	—	—	—			Luv Is Rage 2
"Dark Queen"	2017	91	38	—	—	—	—	—	—	—	—	RIAA: 3× Platinum	Luv Is Rage 2
"20 Min"	2017	— (Note: "20 Min" did not enter the Billboard Hot 100, but peaked at number 17 on the Bubbling Under Hot 100 Singles chart.)	—	—	—	—	—	—	—	—	—	RIAA: 6× Platinum; BPI: Gold; RMNZ: 3× Platinum	Luv Is Rage 2
"Marvelous Day" (Kap G featuring Gunna and Lil Uzi Vert)	2017	—	— (Note: "Marvelous Day" did not enter the Hot R&B/Hip-Hop Songs chart, but peaked at number ten on the Bubbling Under R&B/Hip-Hop Singles chart.)	—	—	—	—	—	—	—	—	RIAA: Gold	Mood
"Shoota" (Playboi Carti featuring Lil Uzi Vert)	2018	46	25	—	—	67	—	—	—	—	—	RIAA: Platinum; BPI: Silver; RMNZ: Platinum	Die Lit
"Life Goes On" (Lil Baby featuring Gunna and Lil Uzi Vert)	2018	74	36	—	—	—	—	—	—	—	—	RIAA: 2× Platinum; RMNZ: Platinum	Harder Than Ever
"What's the Move" (Young Thug featuring Lil Uzi Vert)	2019	55	21	—	—	84	—	—	9	—	—	RIAA: Platinum	So Much Fun
"PTSD" (G Herbo featuring Juice Wrld, Lil Uzi Vert, and Chance the Rapper)	2020	38	19	—	—	69	—	—	22	—	—	RIAA: Platinum; RMNZ: Gold	PTSD
"Commercial" (Lil Baby featuring Lil Uzi Vert)	2020	23	12	8	—	59	—	—	—	—	—	RIAA: Platinum	My Turn
"Baby Pluto"	2020	6	4	3	48	13	77	34	3	36	—	RIAA: Platinum; MC: Platinum	Eternal Atake
"Lo Mein"	2020	8	6	5	85	34	—	—	5	—	—	RIAA: 2× Platinum; MC: Platinum	Eternal Atake
"Silly Watch"	2020	9	7	6	100	36	—	—	6	—	—	RIAA: Gold; MC: Platinum	Eternal Atake
"Pop"	2020	28	17	12	—	68	—	—	—	—	—		Eternal Atake
"You Better Move"	2020	36	23	18	—	79	—	—	—	—	—		Eternal Atake
"Homecoming"	2020	22	14	10	—	54	—	—	—	—	—	RIAA: Platinum; MC: Platinum; RMNZ: Gold	Eternal Atake
"I'm Sorry"	2020	37	24	19	—	66	—	—	—	—	—	MC: Gold	Eternal Atake
"Celebration Station"	2020	34	21	16	—	64	—	—	—	—	—	MC: Gold	Eternal Atake
"Bigger Than Life"	2020	33	20	15	—	70	—	—	—	—	—	MC: Gold	Eternal Atake
"Chrome Heart Tags"	2020	45	29	23	—	86	—	—	—	—	—		Eternal Atake
"Bust Me"	2020	51	31	25	—	87	—	—	—	—	—		Eternal Atake
"Prices"	2020	25	16	11	—	55	—	—	—	—	—	RIAA: Platinum; MC: Gold	Eternal Atake
"Urgency" (featuring Syd)	2020	76	47	—	—	—	—	—	—	—	—		Eternal Atake
"Venetia"	2020	39	25	20	—	61	—	—	—	—	—	MC: Gold	Eternal Atake
"Secure the Bag"	2020	72	44	—	—	—	—	—	—	—	—		Eternal Atake
"P2"	2020	11	9	7	52	20	80	33	2	37	—	RIAA: Gold; MC: 2× Platinum; RMNZ: Gold	Eternal Atake
"Myron"	2020	13	7	5	89	39	—	59	2	58	—	RIAA: 2× Platinum; BPI: Silver; RMNZ: Gold	Lil Uzi Vert vs. the World 2
"Lotus"	2020	45	24	20	—	—	—	—	—	—	—		Lil Uzi Vert vs. the World 2
"Bean (Kobe)" (featuring Chief Keef)	2020	19	10	6	—	60	—	—	9	—	—		Lil Uzi Vert vs. the World 2
"Yessirskiii" (with 21 Savage)	2020	26	14	10	—	88	—	—	11	—	—	RIAA: Platinum	Lil Uzi Vert vs. the World 2
"Wassup" (featuring Future)	2020	54	31	—	—	—	—	—	—	—	—		Lil Uzi Vert vs. the World 2
"Strawberry Peels" (featuring Young Thug and Gunna)	2020	60	34	—	—	—	—	—	—	—	—		Lil Uzi Vert vs. the World 2
"I Can Show You"	2020	66	37	—	—	—	—	—	—	—	—		Lil Uzi Vert vs. the World 2
"Moon Relate"	2020	62	36	—	—	—	—	—	—	—	—		Lil Uzi Vert vs. the World 2
"Come This Way"	2020	83	47	—	—	—	—	—	—	—	—		Lil Uzi Vert vs. the World 2
"Trap This Way (This Way)"	2020	68	38	—	—	—	—	—	—	—	—		Lil Uzi Vert vs. the World 2
"No Auto" (featuring Lil Durk)	2020	76	42	—	—	—	—	—	—	—	—		Lil Uzi Vert vs. the World 2
"Money Spread" (featuring Young Nudy)	2020	89	50	—	—	—	—	—	—	—	—		Lil Uzi Vert vs. the World 2
"Got the Guap" (featuring Young Thug)	2020	87	49	—	—	—	—	—	—	—	—		Lil Uzi Vert vs. the World 2
"Leaders" (featuring Nav)	2020	72	39	—	—	72	—	—	18	—	—		Lil Uzi Vert vs. the World 2
"Status" (Nav featuring Lil Uzi Vert)	2020	— (Note: "Status" did not enter the Billboard Hot 100, but peaked at number one on the Bubbling Under Hot 100 chart.)	47	—	—	69	—	—	—	—	—		Good Intentions
"All Bad" (Future featuring Lil Uzi Vert)	2020	54	21	19	—	—	—	—	—	—	—	RIAA: Gold	High Off Life
"Relentless" (Gunna featuring Lil Uzi Vert)	2020	— (Note: "Relentless " did not enter the Billboard Hot 100, but peaked at number two on the Bubbling Under Hot 100 chart.)	44	—	—	—	—	—	26	—	—		Wunna
"Stripes Like Burberry" (with Future)	2020	46	13	12	—	63	—	—	—	—	48		Pluto × Baby Pluto
"Marni on Me" (with Future)	2020	64	23	21	—	—	—	—	—	—	116		Pluto × Baby Pluto
"Sleeping on the Floor" (with Future)	2020	68	26	24	—	—	—	—	—	—	126		Pluto × Baby Pluto
"Real Baby Pluto" (with Future)	2020	54	17	16	—	92	—	—	—	—	85		Pluto × Baby Pluto
"Drankin n Smokin" (with Future)	2020	31	10	9	—	41	—	—	—	—	33	RIAA: 3× Platinum; MC: 2× Platinum; RMNZ: Gold	Pluto × Baby Pluto
"Million Dollar Play" (with Future)	2020	67	25	23	—	—	—	—	—	—	125		Pluto × Baby Pluto
"Plastic" (with Future)	2020	86	36	—	—	—	—	—	—	—	151		Pluto × Baby Pluto
"That's It" (with Future)	2020	50	14	13	—	69	—	—	—	—	76		Pluto × Baby Pluto
"Bought a Bad Bitch" (with Future)	2020	100	43	—	—	—	—	—	—	—	—		Pluto × Baby Pluto
"Lullaby"	2020	— (Note: "Lullaby" did not enter the Billboard Hot 100, but peaked at number four on the Bubbling Under Hot 100 chart.)	47	—	—	—	—	—	—	—	—		Pluto × Baby Pluto
"She Never Been to Pluto" (with Future)	2020	— (Note: "She Never Been to Pluto" did not enter the Billboard Hot 100, but peaked at number six on the Bubbling Under Hot 100 chart.)	49	—	—	—	—	—	—	—	—		Pluto × Baby Pluto
"Off Dat" (with Future)	2020	— (Note: "Off Dat" did not enter the Billboard Hot 100, but peaked at number 15 on the Bubbling Under Hot 100 chart.)	—	—	—	—	—	—	—	—	—		Pluto × Baby Pluto
"I Don't Wanna Break Up" (with Future)	2020	— (Note: "I Don't Wanna Break Up" did not enter the Billboard Hot 100, but peaked at number 12 on the Bubbling Under Hot 100 chart.)	—	—	—	—	—	—	—	—	—		Pluto × Baby Pluto
"Bankroll" (with Future)	2020	— (Note: "Bankroll" did not enter the Billboard Hot 100, but peaked at number 19 on the Bubbling Under Hot 100 chart.)	—	—	—	—	—	—	—	—	—		Pluto × Baby Pluto
"Moment of Clarity" (with Future)	2020	— (Note: "Moment of Clarity" did not enter the Billboard Hot 100, but peaked at number 14 on the Bubbling Under Hot 100 chart.)	—	—	—	—	—	—	—	—	—		Pluto × Baby Pluto
"There She Go" (Justin Bieber featuring Lil Uzi Vert)	2021	—	—	—	—	—	—	—	22	—	—		Justice (Triple Chucks Deluxe)
"Proud of You" (YSL Records and Young Thug featuring Lil Uzi Vert and Yung Kayo)	2021	59	27	21	—	57	—	—	9	—	65		Slime Language 2
"Lucid Dreams" (remix) (Juice Wrld featuring Lil Uzi Vert)	2021	—	—	—	—	—	—	—	8	—	—		Goodbye & Good Riddance (Anniversary Edition)
"Juggernaut" (Tyler, the Creator featuring Lil Uzi Vert and Pharrell Williams)	2021	40	14	11	—	30	—	—	—	—	38	RIAA: Gold	Call Me If You Get Lost
"From the Garden" (Isaiah Rashad featuring Lil Uzi Vert)	2021	99	33	25	—	—	—	—	—	—	—		The House Is Burning
"Mind of Melvin" (YNW Melly featuring Lil Uzi Vert)	2021	78	25	16	—	96	—	—	—	—	200		Just a Matter of Slime
"Big Tonka" (Yeat featuring Lil Uzi Vert)	2022	— (Note: "Big Tonka" did not enter the Billboard Hot 100, but peaked at number five on the Bubbling Under Hot 100 Singles chart.)	44	—	—	—	—	—	30	—	—		2 Alive (Geek Pack)
"3G" (Yeat featuring Lil Uzi Vert)	2022	— (Note: "3G" did not enter the Billboard Hot 100, but peaked at number eight on the Bubbling Under Hot 100 Singles chart.)	47	—	—	—	—	—	—	—	—		2 Alive (Geek Pack)
"Space Cadet"	2022	— (Note: "Space Cadet" did not enter the Billboard Hot 100, but peaked at number nine on the Bubbling Under Hot 100 Singles chart.)	31	—	—	—	—	—	28	—	—		Red & White
"Cigarette"	2022	—	50	—	—	—	—	—	—	—	—		Red & White
"For Fun"	2022	— (Note: "For Fun" did not enter the Billboard Hot 100, but peaked at number seven on the Bubbling Under Hot 100 Singles chart.)	35	—	—	—	—	—	35	—	—		Red & White
"F.F."	2022	—	—	—	—	—	—	—	40	—	—		Red & White
"Dead Shot" (with Nav)	2022	— (Note: "Dead Shot" did not enter the Billboard Hot 100, but peaked at number seven on the Bubbling Under Hot 100 Singles chart.)	39	—	—	75	—	—	—	—	—		Demons Protected by Angels
"Flawless" (Yeat featuring Lil Uzi Vert)	2022	77	24	—	—	94	—	—	18	—	—		Lyfe
"All the Way Live" (with Metro Boomin and Future)	2023	61	21	14	—	50	—	—	—	—	97		Spider-Man: Across the Spider-Verse (Soundtrack from and Inspired by the Motion Picture)
"Home" (with Metro Boomin and Don Toliver)	2023	— (Note: "Home" did not enter the Billboard Hot 100, but peaked at number one on the Bubbling Under Hot 100 Singles chart.)	39	—	—	79	—	—	—	—	—		Spider-Man: Across the Spider-Verse (Soundtrack from and Inspired by the Motion Picture)
"Hellcat Kenny" (Young Thug featuring Lil Uzi Vert)	2023	70	26	21	—	—	—	—	—	—	—		Business Is Business
"Flooded the Face"	2023	11	4	4	— (Note: "Flooded the Face" did not enter the top 50 of the ARIA Singles Chart, but peaked at number 18 on the ARIA New Music Singles Chart.)	26	—	—	2	63	21		Pink Tape
"Suicide Doors"	2023	25	10	6	—	52	—	—	5	—	59		Pink Tape
"Aye" (featuring Travis Scott)	2023	31	11	7	—	44	—	—	4	93	54		Pink Tape
"Crush Em"	2023	52	18	14	—	72	—	—	—	—	138		Pink Tape
"Amped"	2023	67	27	22	—	100	—	—	—	—	—		Pink Tape
"X2"	2023	53	19	15	—	77	—	—	—	—	151		Pink Tape
"Died and Came Back"	2023	78	32	—	—	—	—	—	—	—	—		Pink Tape
"Spin Again"	2023	51	17	13	—	95	—	—	—	—	160		Pink Tape
"That Fiya"	2023	93	38	—	—	—	—	—	—	—	—		Pink Tape
"I Gotta"	2023	49	16	12	—	71	—	—	—	—	141		Pink Tape
"Mama, I'm Sorry"	2023	65	25	21	—	—	—	—	—	—	—		Pink Tape
"All Alone"	2023	76	31	25	—	—	—	—	—	—	—		Pink Tape
"Nakamura"	2023	71	29	24	—	93	—	—	—	—	—		Pink Tape
"Fire Alarm"	2023	— (Note: "Fire Alarm" did not enter the Billboard Hot 100, but peaked at number one on the Bubbling Under Hot 100 chart.)	41	—	—	—	—	—	—	—	—		Pink Tape
"CS"	2023	— (Note: "CS" did not enter the Billboard Hot 100, but peaked at number four on the Bubbling Under Hot 100 chart.)	—	—	—	—	—	—	—	—	—		Pink Tape
"Werewolf" (featuring Bring Me the Horizon)	2023	81	—	—	—	—	—	—	—	—	—		Pink Tape
"Pluto to Mars"	2023	60	23	19	—	79	—	—	—	—	—		Pink Tape
"Patience" (featuring Don Toliver)	2023	70	28	23	—	—	—	—	—	—	—		Pink Tape
"Days Come and Go"	2023	— (Note: "Days Come and Go" did not enter the Billboard Hot 100, but peaked at number six on the Bubbling Under Hot 100 chart.)	49	—	—	—	—	—	—	—	—		Pink Tape
"Rehab"	2023	— (Note: "Rehab" did not enter the Billboard Hot 100, but peaked at number 12 on the Bubbling Under Hot 100 chart.)	—	—	—	—	—	—	—	—	—		Pink Tape
"The End" (featuring Babymetal)	2023	— (Note: "The End" did not enter the Billboard Hot 100, but peaked at number eight on the Bubbling Under Hot 100 chart.)	—	—	—	—	—	—	—	—	—		Pink Tape
"Zoom"	2023	92	37	—	—	—	—	—	—	—	—		Pink Tape
"Of Course"	2023	— (Note: "Of Course" did not enter the Billboard Hot 100, but peaked at number nine on the Bubbling Under Hot 100 chart.)	—	—	—	—	—	—	—	—	—		Pink Tape
"Love Hurts" (Destroy Lonely featuring Lil Uzi Vert)	2024	—	50	—	—	—	—	—	—	—	—		Love Lasts Forever
"We Good"	2024	82	29	24	—	—	—	—	11	—	—		Eternal Atake 2
"Light Year (Practice)"	2024	54	16	13	—	90	—	—	7	—	197		Eternal Atake 2
"Meteor Man"	2024	— (Note: "Meteor Man" did not enter the Billboard Hot 100, but peaked at number two on the Bubbling Under Hot 100 chart.)	43	—	—	—	—	—	20	—	—		Eternal Atake 2
"Paars in the Mars"	2024	— (Note: "Paars in the Mars" did not enter the Billboard Hot 100, but peaked at number 16 on the Bubbling Under Hot 100 chart.)	—	—	—	—	—	—	—	—	—		Eternal Atake 2
"The Rush" (featuring Big Time Rush)	2024	— (Note: "The Rush" did not enter the Billboard Hot 100, but peaked at number 11 on the Bubbling Under Hot 100 chart.)	—	—	—	—	—	—	—	—	—		Eternal Atake 2
"Not an Option"	2024	— (Note: "Not an Option" did not enter the Billboard Hot 100, but peaked at number five on the Bubbling Under Hot 100 chart.)	46	—	—	—	—	—	—	—	—		Eternal Atake 2
"Mr Chow"	2024	— (Note: "Mr Chow" did not enter the Billboard Hot 100, but peaked at number four on the Bubbling Under Hot 100 chart.)	44	—	—	—	—	—	—	—	—		Eternal Atake 2
"Lyft Em Up"	2024	— (Note: "Lyft Em Up" did not enter the Billboard Hot 100, but peaked at number 15 on the Bubbling Under Hot 100 chart.)	—	—	—	—	—	—	—	—	—		Eternal Atake 2
"Chips and Dip"	2024	— (Note: "Chips and Dip" did not enter the Billboard Hot 100, but peaked at number 12 on the Bubbling Under Hot 100 chart.)	—	—	—	—	—	—	—	—	—		Eternal Atake 2
"Chill Bae"	2024	48	13	10	—	64	—	—	3	—	138		Eternal Atake 2
"PerkySex"	2024	— (Note: "PerkySex" did not enter the Billboard Hot 100, but peaked at number 23 on the Bubbling Under Hot 100 chart.)	—	—	—	—	—	—	—	—	—		Eternal Atake 2
"Conceited"	2024	— (Note: "Conceited" did not enter the Billboard Hot 100, but peaked at number 17 on the Bubbling Under Hot 100 chart.)	—	—	—	—	—	—	—	—	—		Eternal Atake 2
"Space High"	2024	— (Note: "Space High" did not enter the Billboard Hot 100, but peaked at number nine on the Bubbling Under Hot 100 chart.)	—	—	—	—	—	—	—	—	—		Eternal Atake 2
"Jumpin" (with Playboi Carti)	2025	53	26	24	—	65	—	—	—	—	71		Music
"Twin Trim" (with Playboi Carti)	2025	58	30	—	—	68	—	—	—	—	86		Music
"Maverick Intro"	2026	— (Note: "Maverick Intro" did not enter the Billboard Hot 100, but peaked at number 4 on the Bubbling Under Hot 100 chart.)	25	—	—	—	—	—	30	—	—		Maverick "Almost Forever" EP
"Go !"	2026	—	35	—	—	—	—	—	—	—	—		Maverick "Almost Forever" EP
"Poured"	2026	89	19	—	—	—	—	—	19	—	—		Maverick "Almost Forever" EP
"223"	2026	—	34	—	—	—	—	—	—	—	—		Maverick "Almost Forever" EP
"Yoko"	2026	— (Note: "Yoko" did not enter the Billboard Hot 100, but peaked at number 23 on the Bubbling Under Hot 100 chart.)	30	—	—	—	—	—	—	—	—		Maverick "Almost Forever" EP
"Gas. Brake."	2026	—	44	—	—	—	—	—	—	—	—		Maverick "Almost Forever" EP
"Say It Was"	2026	—	40	—	—	—	—	—	—	—	—		Maverick "Almost Forever" EP
"London"	2026	— (Note: "London" did not enter the Billboard Hot 100, but peaked at number 16 on the Bubbling Under Hot 100 chart.)	28	—	—	—	—	—	40	—	—		Maverick "Almost Forever" EP
"—" denotes a recording that did not chart or was not released in that territory.

== Guest appearances ==
List of non-single guest appearances, with other performing artists, showing year released and album name
Title	Year	Other artist(s)	Album
"I Don't Give a Fuck"	2014	Kur	none
"Faded"	2014	Reese LaFlare	BeforeTheUniverse
"Pretty Boy Anthem" (remix)	2014	Reese LaFlare, Lil B	BeforeTheUniverse
"We Rollin'"	2014	Brenmar, Rome Fortune	none
"Made It"	2014	HXV, Rome Fortune	Vultures EP
"What You Off"	2014	HXV	Vultures EP
"4 da Money"	2015	Y.S.L	none
"Pull Up"	2015	Louie V Gutta	none
"Stylin'"	2015	TM88	Sacii Lyfe
"The Man"	2015	Skeme	Ingleworld 2
"Lane Switching"	2015	Iamsu!, AKAFrank	Biggie Smalls
"LFUTP"	2015	Ape Drums, Rizzoo Rizzoo	none
"Codeine"	2015	Omelly, Rich the Kid	On My Time
"Rollie"	2015	LAMB$, Midwest Millz	none
"Psycho"	2015	ManMan Savage	Young & Reckless
"Jody"	2015	Spodee	Out Tha Mudd Vol. 1
"Big Racks"	2015	Young Thug	Slime Season 2
"New Wave"	2015	Lil Duke	Hit Hard, Move Silent
"Run It Up"	2015	Kur	Finally Happened
"Yea Hoe"	2016	Maaly Raw, Young Thug	none
"Fetti"	2016	Juugman, Young Thug, Fetty Wap	none
"Nauseous"	2016	LAMB$, Midwest Millz	none
"Diamond Necklace"	2016	William Aston	none
"Boss Up"	2016	Wave Chappelle	none
"Exotic"	2016	Money June	none
"Urk Skurt"	2016	Oochie	none
"Xans"	2016	Yakki	Yakkstick
"Way Up"	2016	Kodie Shane	2060
"Uzi Gang"	2016	ASAP Ferg, Marty Baller	Always Strive and Prosper
"Stamina"	2016	Moosh & Twist	Growing Pains
"Drippin & Saucin'"	2016	Sosamann, Sauce Walka	none
"Big Money" (C4 remix)	2016	DJ Drama, Rich Homie Quan, Skeme	Quality Street Music 2
"Camera"	2016	DJ Drama, FKi 1st, Mac Miller, Post Malone	Quality Street Music 2
"Flexing On Purpose"	2016	Ralo, Young Thug, 21 Savage	Diary of the Streets II
"RaRa"	2016	Travis Scott	none
"Hold Up (Dough Up)"	2016	Kodie Shane, Lil Yachty	none
"New Level" (remix)	2016	ASAP Ferg, Future, ASAP Rocky	none
"Froze"	2016	Meek Mill, Nicki Minaj	DC4
"Runner"	2016	ASAP Mob	Cozy Tapes Vol. 1: Friends
"Fan Club"	2016	Shy Glizzy	none
"5 Cent"	2016	Tony Zuko	none
"FIZ U"	2016	Skeme	Paranoia
"200,000"	2016	Quavo, Shad da God	ATL
"Young N*gga"	2017	Ralo, Young Thug, Lil Yachty	Famerican Gangster 2
"Can't Lose"	2017	Iggy Azalea	Def Jam Presents: Direct Deposit Vol. 2
"I'm So Gone"	2017	Kodie Shane	none
"Game Over"	2017	Rizzoo Rizzoo	Drip Flair
"Michael Jackson"	2017	Shad da God	God Gang
"Been Ballin"	2017	Steve Aoki	Steve Aoki Presents Kolony
"ASAP Ferg"	2017	Nav, Metro Boomin	Perfect Timing
"NavUziMetro#Pt2"	2017	Nav, Metro Boomin	Perfect Timing
"F*ck That Check Up"	2017	Meek Mill	Wins & Losses
"Everything"	2017	G Herbo	Humble Beast
"Zambamafoo"	2017	Hoodrich Pablo Juan	none
"Mars"	2017	Maxo Kream	none
"Alot"	2017	Zaytoven	Where Would The Game Be Without Me 2
"Don't Try Me"	2017	Dave East	
"Birds"	2017	Zaytoven	Zaytoven Presents: Trapping Made It Happen
"Smoke My Dope"	2017	Steve Aoki	Bright: The Album
"Big Face"	2017	ManMan Savage	Young & Reckless 2
"Mood"	2018	TM88, Southside, Supah Mario	none
"At the Hotel"	2018	Gunna, Young Jordan	Drip Season 3
"Bankroll"	2018	DP Beats, Playboi Carti	DPOnTheBeat Vol. 3
"Bandz (Bye Bye Birdie)"	2018	DP Beats	DPOnTheBeat Vol. 3
"Who Run It" (remix)	2018	G Herbo	none
"Up"	2018	Young Thug	Hear No Evil
"Shoota"	2018	Playboi Carti	Die Lit
"Like a Farmer" (remix)	2018	Lil Tracy	none
"Valentine" (remix)	2018	YK Osiris	none
"What You Know"	2018	Youngboy Never Broke Again	Master the Day of Judgement
"Strong"	2018	Zaytoven	Trapholizay
"Swagger on Mayo"	2018	Freeway	Think Free
"Never Bend" (remix)	2018	03 Greedo	God Level
"Rich N*gga"	2018	Youngboy Never Broke Again	Until Death Call My Name: Reloaded
"With My Slime"	2018	Young Jordan	Slicey
"It's a Slime"	2018	Young Thug	Slime Language
"Glow Up" (remix)	2018	Nav	none
"Motto"	2018	David Guetta, Steve Aoki, G-Eazy, Mally Mall	7
"Super Freak"	2018	Shy Glizzy	Fully Loaded
"Don't Say That"	2018	Blocboy JB	Don't Think That
"Heavy Metal"	2018	Lil Gotit, Lil Keed	none
"Count Up"	2018	Kyyngg	Slime Season 4
"Bankteller"	2018	Desto Dubb, Lil Pump, 03 Greedo, Smokepurpp	none
"Hercules"	2018	Lil Gotit	none
"Everybody Know Me"	2018	Jban$2turnt	Sail or Sink
"Big Bank"	2018	Playboi Carti	none
"Shells"	2018	Shabazz PBG	none
"Habits" (remix)	2019	Nav	Bad Habits
"Money Flip"	2019	Taz Mondega	Now or Never
"Daville"	2019	K.Gibbs	none
"Electricity"	2019	Honest Boyz	Detective Pikachu (soundtrack)
"Igor's Theme"	2019	Tyler, the Creator	Igor
"Potential"	2019	Gucci Mane, Young Dolph	Delusions of Grandeur
"Slayerr"	2019	TM88	none
"How High"	2019	Pi'erre Bourne	The Life of Pi'erre 4
"Cap Flow"	2019	Doowop	Cappin Ain't Dead
"What's the Move"	2019	Young Thug	So Much Fun
"Pose"	2019	Yo Gotti	Untrapped
"Luv Is Art"	2020	A Boogie wit da Hoodie	Artist 2.0
"PTSD"	2020	G Herbo, Juice Wrld, Chance the Rapper	PTSD
"Heartless" (vapor wave remix)	2020	The Weeknd	After Hours (Remixes)
"Heartless" (remix)	2020	The Weeknd	After Hours (Remixes)
"Flexin N' Flashin" (remix)	2020	SimxSantana	Trenches 2 Riches
"Status"	2020	Nav	Good Intentions
"Like This"	2020	G Herbo	PTSD (Deluxe)
"Multiple Flows"	2020	Lil Wayne	Funeral (Deluxe)
"Count a Million"	2020	NoCap	Steel Human
"Right or Wrong"	2020	Shy Glizzy	Young Jefe 3
"Today Was A Good Day"	2020	Cassius Jay	Trap Sinatra 2
"Relentless"	2020	Gunna	Wunna (Deluxe)
"Dolly"	2020	Lil Tecca	Virgo World
"Simply"	2020	Dej Loaf	Sell Sole II
"Bussin"	2020	Doe Boy, Southside	Demons R Us
"Free Lighter"	2020	2 Chainz, Chief Keef	So Help Me God!
"High School Reunion, Prom"	2020	Saint Jhn	While the World Was Burning
"Take Off" (remix)	2020	Popp Hunna	Mud Baby
"Let It Blow"	2021	Only the Family, Memo600	Loyal Bros
"There She Go"	2021	Justin Bieber	Justice (Triple Chucks Deluxe)
"Yeah Kool"	2021	FXXXXY	none
"Proud of You"	2021	YSL Records, Young Thug, Yung Kayo	Slime Language 2
"Yellow Tape"	2021	Young Nudy	Dr. EV4L
"Lucid Dreams" (remix)	2021	Juice Wrld	Goodbye & Good Riddance (Anniversary Edition)
"Sossboy 2"	2021	Pi'erre Bourne	The Life of Pi'erre 5
"I Got It"	2021	Gucci Mane	Ice Daddy
"Cheerio"	2021	Adamn Killa	none
"Juggernaut"	2021	Tyler, the Creator, Pharrell Williams	Call Me If You Get Lost
"Off-White"	2021	NGeeYL	none
"From The Garden"	2021	Isaiah Rashad	The House Is Burning
"Mind of Melvin"	2021	YNW Melly	Just a Matter of Slime
"Two Tone"	2021	Belly	See You Next Wednesday
"Next Up"	2022	Pooh Shiesty, Gucci Mane	Shiesty Season: Certified
"Big Tonka"	2022	Yeat	2 Alive
"3G"	2022	Yeat	2 Alive
"Throw In The Towel"	2022	Hotboii	Blinded By Death
"Fashion"	2022	Hotboii	Blinded By Death
"Dead Shot"	2022	Nav	Demons Protected by Angels
"Interstellar"	2022	Nav	Demons Protected by Angels
"Flawless"	2022	Yeat	Lyfe
"Bank Account"	2022	Baby Keem	The Melodic Blue (Deluxe)
"Miles"	2022	Skaiwater	Rave
"Pudgy"	2022	Smino	Luv 4 Rent
"Stay Awake"	2022	SoFaygo	Pink Heartz
"Spend the Money"	2022	Fousheé	Softcore
"Free Game"	2023	42 Dugg, DJ Drama	I'm Really Like That
"It's A Dream"	2023	Snow Strippers	April Mixtape 3
"All the Way Live"	2023	Metro Boomin, Future	Spider-Man: Across the Spider-Verse (Soundtrack from and Inspired by the Motion Picture)
"Home"	2023	Metro Boomin, Don Toliver	Spider-Man: Across the Spider-Verse (Soundtrack from and Inspired by the Motion Picture)
"Hellcat Kenny"	2023	Young Thug	Business Is Business
"Like This"	2023	Ken Carson, Destroy Lonely	A Great Chaos
"Donny Darko"	2024	Don Toliver	Hardstone Psycho
"Ghost"	2026	Ken Carson	Xperiment

== Music videos ==
Year	Title	Director	Artist(s)
As main performer
2014	"U.Z.I"		none
2015	"Super Saiyan Trunks"		none
2015	"Safe House"	Spike Jordan	none
2015	"All My Chains"		none
2016	"Money Longer"		none
2016	"You Was Right"		none
2016	"Ps and Qs"	YASHXANA	none
2017	"Go Off"		with Travis Scott and Quavo
2017	"Do What I Want"		none
2017	"XO Tour Llif3"	Virgil Abloh	none
2017	"The Way Life Goes" (remix)	Daps	featuring Nicki Minaj
2019	"Free Uzi"		none
2019	"That's a Rack"		none
2019	"Sanguine Paradise"	DAPS	none
2020	"Futsal Shuffle 2020"	Jay Weneta	none
2021	"Demon High"		none
2022	"Just Wanna Rock"	Gibson Hazard	none
2023	"Red Moon"	Be EL Be	none
2024	"Chill Bae"	Gibson Hazard	none
As featured performer
2015	"WDYW"		Carnage featuring Lil Uzi Vert, A$AP Ferg, and Rich The Kid
2015	"Wrong"		Max featuring Lil Uzi Vert
2016	"Pull Up"		Wiz Khalifa featuring Lil Uzi Vert
2016	"Bad and Boujee"	DAPS	Migos featuring Lil Uzi Vert
2016	"Love"		Felix Snow featuring Lil Uzi Vert
2016	"Too Much Sauce"		DJ Esco featuring Future and Lil Uzi Vert
2017	"Goyard Bag"		Fabolous featuring Lil Uzi Vert
2017	"wokeuplikethis*"		Playboi Carti featuring Lil Uzi Vert
2018	"Marvelous Day"	Be El Be	Kap G featuring Lil Uzi Vert and Gunna
2018	"Wanted You"		Nav featuring Lil Uzi Vert
2018	"Been Ballin"		Steve Aoki featuring Lil Uzi Vert
2018	"Up"	Millicent Hailes	Young Thug featuring Lil Uzi Vert
2020	"That's It"		Future & Lil Uzi Vert
2020	"Over Your Head"		Future & Lil Uzi Vert
2021	"Drankin N Smokin"		Future & Lil Uzi Vert
Cameo appearances
2017	"Good for It"		Nav

== Production discography ==
List of producer and songwriting credits (excluding guest appearances, interpolations, and samples) for other artists
Track(s)	Year	Credit	Artist(s)	Album
13. "Marigold"	2020	Producer (with Skrillex, Rick Rubin, Heavy Mellow, Rex Kudo and Cisco Adler)	M.I.A.	Mata
