= Die Lit =

Studio album by Playboi Carti
- Released: May 11, 2018
- Recorded: December 2017 – March 2018
- Genres: Trap; mumble rap
- Length: 57:39
- Labels: AWGE; Interscope
- Producers: Art Dealer; Don Cannon; IndigoChildRick; Maaly Raw; Pi'erre Bourne; Playboi Carti

Playboi Carti chronology
Playboi Carti (2017)	Die Lit (2018)	Whole Lotta Red (2020)

Die Lit is the debut studio album by the American rapper Playboi Carti. It was surprise-released on May 11, 2018, through AWGE and Interscope Records. Carti recorded the album in his hometown of Atlanta between December 2017 and March 2018, months after the release of his debut mixtape Playboi Carti (2017). Produced primarily by Pi'erre Bourne, Die Lit is a trap and mumble rap album incorporating elements of cloud rap, characterized by fragmented production driven by synthesizers and 808 drums and ad-lib heavy delivery emphasizing mood and feeling over lyrical complexity. Its lyrical themes include hedonism, drugs, wealth, sex, relationships, and women. Guest appearances include Skepta, Travis Scott, Lil Uzi Vert, Bourne, Nicki Minaj, Bryson Tiller, Chief Keef, Gunna, Red Coldhearted, Young Thug, and Young Nudy.

Die Lit received generally positive reviews, with critics praising its appeal and production, though some felt it lacked impact. The album was also a commercial success, debuting at number three on the US Billboard 200, with 61,000 album-equivalent units earned in its first week; in July 2019, it was certified Gold by the Recording Industry Association of America (RIAA). The album was supported by the promotional single "Love Hurts" (featuring Travis Scott), released exclusively on SoundCloud on May 2, 2018, and an accompanying North American tour in July and August that year.

== Background and release ==
In April 2017, Playboi Carti released his debut commercial self-titled mixtape, through AWGE and Interscope Records. The project included the breakout hit "Magnolia" and helped establish Carti's signature minimalist style and ad-lib-heavy delivery. He began working on Die Lit in December 2017, teasing its development through a video captioned "Album Mode". Pi'erre Bourne served as the album's executive producer. In March 2018, Bourne teased that the project had been finalized via Twitter. Carti recorded much of Die Lit in his hometown of Atlanta, seeking to reconnect with the creative energy of his early days. He described working in a stripped-back environment—"white tee on, no jewellery"—and relying on instinct rather than overthinking, stating, "You always got to remember how you got here". Carti emphasized the spontaneous nature of the sessions, often recording five or six tracks in one sitting with Bourne.

Die Lit was first previewed with the promotional single "Love Hurts" featuring Travis Scott, released on May 2, 2018, exclusively via SoundCloud. On May 10, AWGE labelhead ASAP Rocky revealed the album's artwork. The album was surprise-released on May 11, 2018, premiering on Tidal before becoming available on other streaming platforms. A week prior to its release, several tracks from the album leaked online, including an alternate demo of "Shoota" featuring an additional verse from Lil Uzi Vert, along with unreleased songs such as "They Go Off", "Tattoo", and "Arm and Leg", which later became fan favorites. The cover photo, photographed by Nick Walker, depicts Carti diving into a crowd based on a reference photo of an old punk rock show. The cover became the subject of online speculation due to two prominent figures in the crowd—a woman with a mohawk and a bearded man who many fans mistakenly identified as Foo Fighters lead vocalist Dave Grohl. In 2023, the man was identified as actor Francisco Marcano, who was unaware his image would be used for the album artwork. A music video for the track "R.I.P." was released on June 12, 2018, featuring a cameo from Marcano. The video, directed by Walker, depicts Carti moshing relentlessly in a stark black-and-white moshpit. To support the album, Carti embarked on a tour of North America from July 24 to August 17, 2018.

== Composition ==
Die Lit is a trap and mumble rap album that incorporates elements of cloud rap. The production, primarily handled by Pi'erre Bourne, who contributes to fifteen of nineteen tracks, utilizes synthesizers and 808 drums, and was described as featuring "addictive fragmented tones" from "hacked Game Boy's, busted subwoofers, and chopped and screwed snippets of Ratatat records" by Pitchfork's Evan Rytlewski. Carti's vocal delivery, which Spin's Winston Cook-Wilson described as "post-verbal", emphasizes mood and feeling over lyrical complexity and heavily features ad-libs that function as both part of the beat and the central rapping. Thom Bettridge of 032c and Will Schube of Complex both retrospectively noted the use of Carti's pitch-shifted "baby voice" on several songs. Lyrically, Die Lit focuses on sex and youthful hedonism, with Carti frequently referencing drugs, wealth, relationships, and women in repetitive phrases devoid of narrative or subtext. Carti cited the "crazy" energy of his live shows as an influence on his music following the release of Playboi Carti; Bettridge likewise viewed the album as an attempt to incorporate punk influences into his sound.

The opening track, "Long Time (Intro)", uses "warm, off-kilter keyboards" and "skittering drums" to create a celebratory atmosphere underpinning Carti's expressive, braggadocious delivery on the track, according to Sputnikmusic. Eric Sundermann of The Fader described the song as an example of Carti's "quiet confidence", writing that his repeated line "Just to look like this it took a long time"—delivered slyly with a playful melody—conveys poise and self-assurance to the listener. "R.I.P." sees Carti brag about what he plans to do to his enemies and their girls over a production featuring "explosive" 808 drums and a "foreboding" Jodeci sample. Sputnikmusic characterized it as a display of "buzzing bass and glimmering keyboards", in which Carti's loopy chants function as rhythmic hooks. "Lean 4 Real" featuring Skepta was described by Larry Fitzmaurice of The Fader as having an IndigoChildRick-produced beat that is "soothed-out" and "ghostly", with a central melody "like steam hissing out of a broken pipe". "Love Hurts", featuring Travis Scott, sees Carti delivering a relaxed flow punctuated by ad-libs throughout the song, while Scott contributes an energetic verse that reflects his "rock-star mentality", boasting about wealth and romantic exploits. "Shoota", featuring Lil Uzi Vert, is a "triumph anthem" built around "victorious pianos", over which Uzi brags about "bust downs and touchdowns" and Carti outlines plans for a robbery "with the troops".

On "Right Now", Carti's flow is described as more focused, boosted by the track's atmospheric vibe. On "Poke It Out", Nicki Minaj delivers an extended verse that initially mirrors Carti before diverging, over Bourne's "bright and bouncy" beat. "Home (KOD)" features call and response vocal patterns, whilst "Fell in Luv" features Bourne chopping Purity Ring's vocals into a "trippy collage". "Pull Up" features "skittering production" that Neil Z. Yeung of AllMusic described as "[leaning] more heavily on random noises than actual rhyming". A. Harmony of Exclaim! described "Mileage" as a "super fun nod to sexual agency". "No Time" features "crisp and icy" production by Don Cannon. "Choppa Won't Miss" finds Carti and Young Thug "making lots of silly noises", a playful moment that Rytlewski likened to "kids playing over a toy chest". "R.I.P. Fredo (Notice Me)" pays tribute to the late rapper Fredo Santana; A. Harmony of Exclaim! felt that the track "proves that 'lit' and 'mournful' are not mutually exclusive". Throughout the song, Carti repeats the phrase "notice me" 32 times with varing cadences that Bettridge of 032c described as shifting from excitement to desperation and disappointment, before morphing phonetically into "know it's me", which he viewed as "an anxious command for recognition".

== Critical reception ==
Die Lit ratings
Aggregate scores
Source	Rating
Metacritic	71/100
Review scores
Source	Rating
AllMusic	2.5/5 stars
Exclaim!	6/10
Highsnobiety	4.0/5
HipHopDX	3.0/5
HotNewHipHop	79%
Pitchfork	8.5/10
RapReviews	6.5/10
Spectrum Culture	3.5/5 stars
Sputnikmusic	3.8/5
Tiny Mix Tapes	4/5

According to the review aggregator Metacritic, Die Lit received "generally favorable reviews" based on a weighted average score of 71 out of 100 from 7 critic scores.

Evan Rytlewski of Pitchfork lauded the album, calling it "an album that works almost completely from its own lunatic script", and described it as "a perversely infectious sugar high, rap that fundamentally recalibrates the brain's reward centers", Rytlewski emphasized the strength of Pi'erre Bourne's production and Carti's embrace of repetition and minimalism as core components of the album's appeal. Tiny Mix Tapes writer Corrigan B praised Die Lit as a natural evolution from Carti's debut, describing it as "an album of party records" and a "perfect encapsulation of the sea change in rap's audience", adding that its tracks are designed to be endlessly looped in social settings until their hooks and bass are "burned into the brain of every attendee".

Sputnikmusic echoed this sentiment, highlighting the hypnotic effect of the production and its ability to transform minimal melodic fragments into "a thick sonic weave", whilst also describing its cohesion between Carti as "ineffably utopian". Maxwell Cavaseno of HotNewHipHop regarded Die Lit as "the closest to a fully realized album as Carti is ever going to come close to achieving", praising its ability to do "so much while doing so very little". Neil Z. Yeung of AllMusic compared the album's style to that of Rae Sremmurd and Migos, stating that the "big-bass trap anthems owe much to their club-friendly vibe, but offer little in terms of substance or lasting impact". Similarly, Riley Wallace of HipHopDX acknowledged Carti's growing artistry, but wrote that the project was unlikely to sway skeptics, stating that while it is "a more respectable body of work", it wouldn't "win over any naysayers". A. Harmony from Exclaim! called it "fun enough", but argued that it "has the lifespan of a mayfly", suggesting that while enjoyable in the moment, the album may lack long-term replay value.

Critics offered mixed opinions on the album's numerous guest appearances. Several reviewers highlighted Skepta's grime-inflected verse on "Lean 4 Real" as one of the project's strongest moments, with Rytlewski highlighting that his sharp enunciation provided a striking contrast to Carti's minimalist style and Cavaseno praising how it added new dimensions to the track. Nicki Minaj's extended verse on "Poke It Out" and Bryson Tiller's contribution to "Fell in Luv" were also frequently singled out for praise, with Jake Indiana of Highsnobiety observing that the features were seamlessly absorbed into Carti's atmospheric production rather than overpowering it, and Wallace and Corrigan B acknowledging that both guests adapted effectively to the album's sound. Conversely, some critics felt certain collaborations fell flat; Cavaseno described Minaj's verse as eventually veering into her "worst stylistic impulses" and found pairings with Young Thug and Travis Scott underwhelming given the high expectations.

=== Rankings ===
Select rankings of Die Lit
Publication	List	Rank	Ref.
Complex	50 Best Albums of 2018	45	
Crack	The Top 50 Albums of 2018	6	
Fact	The 50 Best Albums of 2018	35	
Gorilla vs. Bear	Gorilla vs. Bear's Albums of 2018	20	
Highsnobiety	The 25 Best Albums of 2018	17	
Noisey	Noisey's 100 Best Albums of 2018	23	
Pitchfork	The 50 Best Albums of 2018	25	
Pitchfork	The 100 Best Rap Albums of All Time	43	
Rolling Stone	The 250 Greatest Albums of the 21st Century So Far	144	
Spin	51 Best Albums of 2018	18	
Tiny Mix Tapes	Favorite 50 Music Releases of 2018	16	

== Legacy and influence ==
Die Lit has been cited as an early influence on the emergence of the rage microgenre of trap music in the early 2020s. Gabriel Bras Nevares of HotNewHipHop described the album as laying "the foundation for rage [...], building on Playboi Carti's minimalist and ad-lib driven hedonism with woozy synths and an emphasis on vibes over substance", highlighting tracks such as "Love Hurts" and "Foreign" as early examples of the sound's development. Bras Nevares also stated that while earlier artists such as Lil Uzi Vert and Kanye West had introduced experimental synth textures into hip-hop, Die Lit represented "the first sign of trap and the SoundCloud scene evolving into something else".

In 2025, Will Schube of Complex described Die Lit as "one of the most influential rap records of the past decade", crediting it with shaping the sound and aesthetic of the contemporary underground scene and influencing Whole Lotta Red (2020). Schube further identified the album as the point where Carti refined his "baby voice" delivery, which became one of his defining stylistic trademarks. The same year, Rolling Stone ranked Die Lit at number 144 on their "The 250 Greatest Albums of the 21st Century So Far" list, with writer Jeff Ihaza crediting the album with "[ushering] the SoundCloud rap era into the mainstream" and calling it the "blueprint for the rap in the modern era."

== Commercial performance ==
Die Lit debuted at number three on the US Billboard 200 chart, earning 61,000 album-equivalent units (including 5,000 copies as pure album sales) in its first week. On July 31, 2019, the album was certified Gold by the Recording Industry Association of America (RIAA) for combined sales and streams in excess of 500,000 units in the United States. As of January 2021, the album has earned 1.1 million album-equivalent units and net 1.67 billion on-demand streams for its tracks.

== Track listing ==
All tracks produced by Pi'erre Bourne, except where noted.

Die Lit track listing
No.	Title	Writer(s)	Producer(s)	Length
1.	"Long Time (Intro)"	Jordan Carter; Jung Cho	Art Dealer	3:31
2.	"R.I.P."	Carter; Jordan Jenks; Donald DeGrate Jr.; Reginald Moore; Shirley Murdock; Larry Troutman; Roger Troutman		3:12
3.	"Lean 4 Real" (featuring Skepta)	Carter; Joseph Adenuga; Stewart Mullings	IndigoChildRick	2:57
4.	"Old Money"	Carter; Jenks		2:15
5.	"Love Hurts" (featuring Travis Scott)	Carter; Jacques Webster II; Jenks	Pi'erre Bourne; Playboi Carti	3:00
6.	"Shoota" (featuring Lil Uzi Vert)	Carter; Symere Woods; Jamaal Henry	Maaly Raw	2:33
7.	"Right Now" (featuring Pi'erre Bourne)	Carter; Jenks		3:27
8.	"Poke It Out" (with Nicki Minaj)	Carter; Onika Maraj; Jenks		4:29
9.	"Home (KOD)"	Carter; Jenks		2:42
10.	"Fell in Luv" (featuring Bryson Tiller)	Carter; Bryson Tiller; Jenks; Megan James; Corin Roddick; Isaac Gerasimou		3:26
11.	"Foreign"	Carter; Jenks		2:22
12.	"Pull Up"	Carter; Jenks		3:36
13.	"Mileage" (featuring Chief Keef)	Carter; Keith Cozart; Jenks		2:29
14.	"FlatBed Freestyle"	Carter; Jenks		3:13
15.	"No Time" (featuring Gunna)	Carter; Sergio Kitchens; Donald Cannon; Tjshan Stennett	Don Cannon; Treshaun Beatz^{[a]}	3:39
16.	"Middle of the Summer" (featuring Red Coldhearted)	Carter; Dashia Aaron; Jenks		2:17
17.	"Choppa Won't Miss" (featuring Young Thug)	Carter; Jeffery Williams; Jenks		3:37
18.	"R.I.P. Fredo (Notice Me)" (featuring Young Nudy)	Carter; Quantavious Thomas; Jenks		2:41
19.	"Top" (featuring Pi'erre Bourne)	Carter; Cameron Pitts; Jenks		2:13
Total length:				57:39

Notes

- ^{^[a]} signifies an uncredited co-producer

Sample credits

- "R.I.P." contains a sample from "What About Us", written by Donald DeGrate Jr., Reginald Moore, Shirley Murdock, Larry Troutman and Roger Troutman, as performed by Jodeci.
- "Fell in Luv" contains a sample from "Grandloves", written by Megan James, Corin Roddick and Isaac Gerasimou, as performed by Purity Ring.

== Charts ==
=== Weekly charts ===
2018 weekly chart performance for Die Lit
Chart (2018)	Peak position
Australian Albums (ARIA)	49
Belgian Albums (Ultratop Flanders)	41
Belgian Albums (Ultratop Wallonia)	116
Canadian Albums (Billboard)	9
Dutch Albums (Album Top 100)	19
Irish Albums (IRMA)	38
New Zealand Albums (RMNZ)	27
Swiss Albums (Schweizer Hitparade)	37
UK Albums (Official Charts)	27
UK R&B Albums (Official Charts)	36
US Billboard 200	3
US Top R&B/Hip-Hop Albums (Billboard)	2

2025 weekly chart performance for Die Lit
Chart (2025)	Peak position
Portuguese Albums (AFP)	167
UK R&B Albums (Official Charts)	15

=== Year-end charts ===
2018 year-end chart performance for Die Lit
Chart (2018)	Position
US Billboard 200	123
US Top R&B/Hip-Hop Albums (Billboard)	54

2019 year-end chart performance for Die Lit
Chart (2019)	Position
US Billboard 200	145

2022 year-end chart performance for Die Lit
Chart (2022)	Position
US Billboard 200	150

== Certifications ==
Certifications for Die Lit
Region	Certification	Certified units/sales
Poland (ZPAV)	Platinum	20,000^{‡}
United Kingdom (BPI)	Gold	100,000^{‡}
United States (RIAA)	Gold	500,000^{‡}
^{‡} Sales+streaming figures based on certification alone.

== Release history ==
Release history for Die Lit
Region	Date	Label(s)	Format(s)	Edition	Ref.
Various	May 11, 2018	AWGE; Interscope	Digital download; streaming	Standard	
Various	June 27, 2025	AWGE; Interscope	2LP	Standard	
