= Stripes Like Burberry =

2020 song by Future And Lil Uzi Vert

Song by Lil Uzi Vert and Future

from the album Pluto x Baby Pluto
- Released: November 13, 2020
- Genre: Trap
- Length: 4:35
- Label: Epic
- Songwriters: William Moore; Nayvadius Wilburn; Symere Woods
- Producer: DJ Esco

"Stripes Like Burberry" is a song by American rappers Lil Uzi Vert and Future as the opening track from their collaborative album Pluto x Baby Pluto, released on November 13, 2020. The song was produced by DJ Esco. The song reached number 46 on the Billboard Hot 100

== Credits and personnel ==
- Lil Uzi Vert – vocals, songwriting
- Future – vocals, songwriting
- DJ Esco – production, songwriting
- Bryan Anzel – mastering, mixing, recording
- Eric Manco – mastering, mixing, recording

== Charts ==
| Chart (2020) | Peak position |
|---|---|
| Canada Hot 100 (Billboard) | 63 |
| US Billboard Hot 100 | 46 |
| US Hot R&B/Hip-Hop Songs (Billboard) | 13 |
