= Drankin n Smokin =

2020 song by Future And Lil Uzi Vert

Song by Future and Lil Uzi Vert

from the album Pluto x Baby Pluto
- Released: November 13, 2020
- Genre: Trap
- Length: 3:34
- Label: Epic
- Songwriter(s): Nayvadius DeMun Wilburn; Symere Bysil Woods; Dwan Avery; Hagan Lange; Michael Brendan O'Brien
- Producer(s): DY Krazy, Hagan & 12Hunna

Music video
- "Drankin N Smokin" on YouTube

"Drankin n Smokin" is a song by American rappers Lil Uzi Vert and Future from their collaborative album Pluto x Baby Pluto, released on November 13, 2020. The song was produced by DY Krazy, Hagan and 12Hunna. The song reached number 31 on the Billboard Hot 100 and was certified triple platinum by the Recording Industry Association of America (RIAA).

== Music video ==
A music video was released on January 7, 2021, directed by DJ Esco and Sam Lecca, and featuring cameos by Lil Duval and Freebandz' rapper Casino.

== Charts ==
Chart (2020)	Peak position
Canada (Canadian Hot 100)	87
US Billboard Hot 100	31
US Hot R&B/Hip-Hop Songs (Billboard)	10

== Certifications ==
Region	Certification	Certified units/sales
Canada (Music Canada)	2× Platinum	160,000^{‡}
New Zealand (RMNZ)	Gold	15,000^{‡}
United Kingdom (BPI)	Silver	200,000^{‡}
United States (RIAA)	3× Platinum	3,000,000^{‡}
^{‡} Sales+streaming figures based on certification alone.
