= Music leak =

Unauthorized leak of music online

A music leak is an unauthorized release of music over the internet. Songs or albums may leak days or months before their scheduled release date. In other cases, the leaked material may be demos or scrapped work never intended for public release. Leaks often originate from hackers who gain unauthorized access to the online storage of an artist, label, producer, or journalist.

== Sources ==
Leaking music can occur in different ways. The most popular and modern method of such is when the material in question is acquired by hackers who gain unauthorized access to the e-mail or cloud storage accounts of artists, producers or record labels. Some leaks originate from advance copies sent to journalists, and are leaked by the journalists themselves or friends, family members etc. with whom they shared the music. Another now semi-outdated method is when physical copies are pre ordered (especially CD copies), some fans would obtain the album through mail-order far earlier than as expected, which would result in the fan ripping the contents and sharing it several days or a week before its intended release. Journalists rarely leak music directly to the public, at least not intentionally, as doing so jeopardizes their careers and may even violate legal agreements (i.e.. similar to non-disclosure agreements). Some leaks follow a combination of both aforementioned routes: unauthorized access to journalists' storage. For example, the 2006 Joanna Newsom album Ys was leaked when a hacker gained access to an FTP server maintained by the music publication Pitchfork. In 2015, a server controlled by the music website Spin was hacked, resulting in the leaking of albums by Beach House, Mac DeMarco, and Destroyer. It has been alleged that some record labels intentionally stage leaks to create publicity.

== Distribution ==
During the 1990s, leaked music was occasionally shared on the internet, despite relatively slow transmission speeds and music codecs being in their infancy. One of the first albums to leak on the internet was Depeche Mode's 1993 album Songs of Faith and Devotion, which was shared by fans in chat rooms.

In the early 2000s, peer-to-peer file sharing sites such as Napster were widely used not only for musical piracy, but also for the distribution of leaked music. The landmark copyright lawsuit Metallica v. Napster, Inc. centered on the leak of a demo recording of the Metallica song "I Disappear", which was planned to be released as part of the soundtrack to Mission: Impossible II. The leaked demo, which made its way onto radio airplay, was traced to Napster.

As peer-to-peer file sharing networks attached to specific, usually proprietary software (e.g. WinMX, LimeWire) declined in popularity, other channels have been used for the distribution of leaked music, such as BitTorrent and file hosting websites such as MediaFire. The same channels that are used for music piracy more generally will also be used for leaks.

== Reactions ==
When a song or album leaks ahead of its scheduled release date, record labels often react by moving the release earlier, a process which became simpler as music has shifted from physical to mostly digital distribution. An early example of this was Eminem's 2002 album The Eminem Show. Originally scheduled for June, its release date was moved to May 28 after the album leaked that month.

The effect of leaks on sales or popularity is unclear. In 2000, the album Kid A, by the English rock band Radiohead, was leaked online and shared on the peer-to-peer service Napster. Asked whether he believed Napster had damaged sales, the Capitol president Ray Lott likened the situation to unfounded concern about home taping in the 1980s. In some cases, a leak may precipitate an official release for materials not planned for release. For example, in 2019, Radiohead released MiniDiscs [Hacked], an archive of recordings made around the recording of their 1997 album OK Computer, after a hacker leaked them online.

Labels may attempt to stop or slow the spread of leaked files by issuing DMCA takedown notices to websites hosting leaked material, or search engines which index these sites.

== Prevalence ==
Album leaks have become increasingly common, with some record executives stating that, beginning in the late 2000s, most albums leak "as a matter of course", though many of these leaks occur shortly before the album's scheduled release and therefore have relatively little effect. When Watch the Throne, a 2011 collaboration between rappers Jay-Z and Kanye West, was released without being preceded by any leaks, this was noted as an unusual circumstance for a highly anticipated album in the Internet age.

== Prevention ==
Copy Control logo, used on some CDs from 2001 to 2006

=== Digital software ===
Copy protection software has been used on CD releases to prevent the unauthorised distribution of music onto online sites. A notable example of this was the Copy Control system, a digital rights management software system used on around 22 million CDs from 2001 to 2006, which was discontinued in the wake of its supposed use as a rootkit in the Sony BMG copy protection rootkit scandal.

Digital watermarks, typically used on CD advance copies have allowed leaks to be traced to their original source, are used to deter would-be leakers as it allows them to face legal action. While the source of a leak is not usually announced, it has been in the past; an example of this was with the 2009 Converge album Axe to Fall, where the band publicly named and shamed Shaun Hand at MetalSucks.net, whom the album leak had been traced back to using a digital watermark on a CD advance copy. This can be used to create viral negative publicity.

=== Fake album releases ===
Prior to the release of her 2003 album American Life, Madonna planted files on file sharing websites purporting to be leaked tracks from the album; in fact, the audio files consisted of Madonna saying: "What the fuck do you think you're doing?" Progressive metal band Tool also announced a fake album called "Systema Encéphale" with a fake tracklist to deter and detract from leaks of their 2001 album Lateralus.

=== Surprise or early releases ===
The rise in leaks during the 2000s led to some popular recording artists surprise-releasing their albums. Some artists have released their albums early to deter leaking, for example Greg Puciato's 2020 solo album Child Soldier: Creator of God, which was released three weeks earlier than its planned release date in response to a leak.

== Notable leaks ==
Album	Artist	Release date	Details
Untouchables	Korn	June 11, 2002	Leaked in a slightly unfinished format four months before the album's planned release. The band said the leak originated from a hacker stealing files from James Shaffer's laptop, though it has also been suggested the band's vocalist Johnathan Davis intentionally leaked the album due to a spat between the band and their record label, Epic Records. The album's release date was moved forward a month.
Hail to the Thief	Radiohead	June 9, 2003	An unfinished version of Hail to the Thief, comprising rough edits and unmixed songs, leaked online ten weeks before release. The guitarist Jonny Greenwood wrote that Radiohead were "pissed off", not with downloaders but because of the "sloppy" release of unfinished work.
Dangerously in Love	Beyoncé	June 24, 2003	Multiple songs from Beyoncé's debut solo album leaked online, leading to the sale of physical bootleg CDs. The album's release date was moved forward two weeks as a result.
X&Y	Coldplay	June 6, 2005	Leaked a week before its official release, with an early recording of Talk leaked in early 2005.
Guapa	La Oreja de Van Gogh	April 25, 2006	Two days before its official premiere, the telephone company Movistar offered a Sony Ericson phone with the 13 tracks from the album and the video of the first single preloaded in the phone, causing the album to already be pirated before its official release.
Axe to Fall	Converge	October 20, 2009	Leaked from a CD advance copy from MetalSucks.net staff member Shaun Hand. The band traced the leak to him, and publicly named and shamed him on Twitter, prompting an apology from MetalSucks.
4	Beyoncé	June 28, 2011	4 was originally scheduled to be in the United States on June 28, 2011, however, the album was leaked in full on the internet on June 7. The album would be released on schedule anyway. In August 2013, NME reported that Sony Music were suing a 47-year-old man from Gothenburg for US$233,000 concerning the leak of 4.
Rebel Heart	Madonna	March 6, 2015	Rebel Heart was originally planned for an early 2015 release, with the lead single, "Living for Love", to be released on Valentine's Day. Two tracks from the album leaked on the internet on November 28, 2014, with an additional thirteen leaking on December 17. In response to the leaks, Madonna made the album available to pre-order on the iTunes Store on December 20 and gave those who pre-ordered early access to six tracks from the album. The lead single "Living for Love" was rush-released on the same date, far ahead of its planned release date. On January 21, 2015, an Israeli man believed to have originally acquired the leaked tracks via hacking was arrested. He was ultimately sentenced to fourteen months in a Tel Aviv prison. In social media postings at the time, Madonna described the leaks as "artistic rape" and a form of terrorism.
Ornament & Crime	Self	August 25, 2017	Originally intended to release in late 2003, the album was delayed until March 3, 2004, to accommodate for new material. Shortly after completion, Self's label, DreamWorks Records was acquired by Geffen Records, and the album was indefinitely shelved by the company as executives believed it would be a commercial failure. Upon news of the delay reaching fans, a demo version of the album was leaked online via. the blogging website LiveJournal in mid–2004, followed by a second unmastered version of the album later leaking on the peer-to-peer network LimeWire in early 2005.
Yandhi	Kanye West	Unreleased	The album was originally teased in September 2018, with a release on the 29th of that month. West went on SNL to promote the album, but it didn't release on that date. Yandhi was reannounced as Jesus Is King in August 2019; it was released on October 25, 2019. The album's tracks would go on to leak; the track "Hurricane" made it to 2021's Donda, and the track "City in the Sky" was released on 2024's Vultures 2 as "Sky City".
XCX World	Charli XCX	Unreleased	The original third studio album by Charli XCX, unofficially referred to as XCX World by fans, would have been preceded by the singles, "After the Afterparty" and "Boys". The album's official release was cancelled after it leaked on August 20, 2017. Charli released a different album, Charli, in 2019.
"Pissy Pamper"	Young Nudy ft Playboi Carti	Unreleased	Leaked in full on April 18, 2019. An unofficial upload of the song, featuring just Playboi Carti's verse, topped the Spotify US Viral 50 chart in late May 2019, after a performance at the Coachella Valley Music and Arts Festival. Unofficial uploads of the song continue to be released despite repeated takedowns. Due to sample issues, the song wouldn't be able to be released either way.
Leak 04-13 (Bait Ones)	Jai Paul	June 1, 2019	The album was leaked and illegally sold through Bandcamp under the title Jai Paul on 13 April 2013. Following the incident, Paul largely withdrew from public view and took an extended hiatus from music production. Six years after the leak, the album was officially released by Paul.
MiniDiscs [Hacked]	Radiohead	June 11, 2019	More than 16 hours of demos, rehearsals, live performances and other material recorded while Radiohead were working on their 1997 album OK Computer leaked in June 2019. According to some reports, a bootleg collector demanded a ransom from Radiohead, but he denied this and it was not corroborated by fans who negotiated with him. After the recordings leaked, Radiohead released them through the music sharing site Bandcamp.
Future Nostalgia	Dua Lipa	March 27, 2020	The album leaked in full over the weekend of March 21–22. Lipa subsequently announced over Instagram live that it would be released a week ahead of its originally scheduled April release.
Harry's House	Harry Styles	May 20, 2022	Reportedly leaked in its entirety on April 20, 2022, a month before its release. Sony Music, who owns Columbia Records, advised against listening to the leaks on Twitter, and provoked a strong reaction from a portion of Styles' fanbase, who pleaded for people not to listen to the leaks. Regardless, the album was released on its originally scheduled release date of May 20.
Renaissance	Beyoncé	July 29, 2022	Two days before the scheduled release, on July 27, the album arrived in retailers in France and eventually leaked online. Beyoncé would post an open letter onto her website the following day concerning the leaks.
Barter 16	Lil Uzi Vert	Unreleased	This mixtape was originally teased shortly after the release of Uzi's third studio album, Pink Tape, in 2023. Several songs that were planned to be on the mixtape would subsequently leak, and despite Uzi later teasing a September 2023 release, the mixtape was ultimately never officially released.
Problématique	Kim Petras	September 18, 2023	Nearly leaked in full in early August 2023, Kim react with a tweet of "listen to the leaks if they wanted to" then delete after that, cancellation confirmed on the interview before the Outside Land Festival Set; after a year of cancellation, album got a final release date on 18 September after Kim teasing the album with the new explicit Twitter profile picture on early September.
A Great Chaos	Ken Carson	October 13, 2023	Leaked in full after several songs were shared on a Discord server on October 9, 2023, four days before the album's official release date.
The Tortured Poets Department	Taylor Swift	April 19, 2024	Leaked in full on April 16, 2024, three days before the album's official release date. Fans on Twitter (or X) had mixed reactions, ranging from shock to rage. Swift never commented on the leaks.
Clancy	Twenty One Pilots	May 24, 2024	Leaked in full on May 17, 2024, which was the album's originally planned release date before being delayed by a week due to the band finishing the album's music videos. Many stores mistakenly sold [CD] and vinyl copies of the album on the original release date, leading to it leaking online the same day. Tyler Joseph later joked about the leak on a live stream in which he and bandmate Josh Dun premiered the album's music videos.
Jump Out	OsamaSon	January 24, 2025	Osamason's music and information from his personal life has been frequently leaked throughout his career; he hoped to release Jump Out without any leaks. The album was first leaked on December 24, 2024, resulting its track listing being revised, and was ultimately released weeks ahead of schedule after being leaked again through Telegram and Discord; the premature release also aborted plans for a rollout.
Something Beautiful	Miley Cyrus	May 30, 2025	Several songs from the album surfaced online on Telegram, though others remained unleaked.
Period	Kesha	July 4, 2025	Leaked in full on May 7, 2025, on Twitter and Telegram with a watermark, the album got leaked 2 months before the official release date. Some fans believe that the leak was made by Kesha's antifans after she threw shade to Katy Perry on Twitter after she worked on her new album with Dr. Luke.
Day and Night	Carly Rae Jepsen	Sep 16,2026	Carly began working on her 7th studio album in 2023 after the release of The Loveliest Time, she teased some of the tracks on her Instagram account. Multiple versions of 7 songs from the album sessions were leaked on July 11, 2024, with some of them being only about a month old. Upon hearing the songs, fans believe that they were unfinished at the time of the leak.

== See also ==
- Bootleg recording
- Category:Lists of unreleased songs by recording artists
