= Kolorblind =

2018 mixtape by DJ Esco

KOLORBLIND

Studio album by DJ Esco
- Released: March 30, 2018
- Genres: Hip hop; trap
- Length: 39:42
- Labels: Freebandz; Epic
- Producers: DJ Esco (also exec.); ATL Jacob; DJ Spinz; Dre Moon; Metro Boomin; Will A Fool

DJ Esco chronology
Project E.T. Esco Terrestrial (2016)	KOLORBLIND (2018)

Professional ratings
Review scores
Source	Rating
HipHopDX	3.6/5

Kolorblind (stylized in all caps) is the debut album by American record producer DJ Esco. It was released on March 30, 2018, via Freebandz/Epic Records. It features guest appearances from Future, Young Thug, A Boogie wit da Hoodie, Dej Loaf, Nas, O.T. Genasis, Rich the Kid, Schoolboy Q, Ty Dolla $ign and Guap Tarantino. The album peaked at number 38 on the US Billboard 200 chart, remaining Esco's only project to reach the chart.

While Future appears on every single song of the project, he is not officially credited as an album artist but merely as a featured artist.

== Track listing ==
No.	Title	Producer(s)	Length
1.	"No Slow Money" (featuring Future and Young Thug)	DJ Esco	2:50
2.	"Xotic" (featuring Rich The Kid, Young Thug and Future)	DJ Esco	2:56
3.	"Chek" (featuring Future)	Dre Moon; Metro Boomin	3:22
4.	"Light Show" (featuring Guap Tarantino and Future)	DJ Spinz	4:03
5.	"Warzone" (featuring Future)	Will A Fool	3:28
6.	"Walk Thru" (featuring Nas and Future)	DJ Esco	4:58
7.	"Showed You" (featuring Future, A Boogie Wit Da Hoodie, Dej Loaf and Young Thug)	DJ Esco	4:27
8.	"Bring It Out" (featuring O.T. Genasis and Future)	DJ Esco	3:32
9.	"Code of Honor" (featuring Future and ScHoolboy Q)	DJ Esco	3:35
10.	"Psychedelik Smoke" (featuring Future and Ty Dolla $ign)	DJ Esco	3:01
11.	"Fuk Faces" (featuring Future)	ATL Jacob	3:30
Total length:			39:42

== Chart history ==
Chart (2018)	Peak position
US Billboard 200	38
US Top R&B/Hip-Hop Albums (Billboard)	22
US Top Rap Albums (Billboard)	19
