= Flawless (Yeat song) =

2022 song by Yeat featuring Lil Uzi Vert

Song by Yeat featuring Lil Uzi Vert

from the EP Lyfe
- Released: September 9, 2022
- Length: 2:56
- Label: Field Trip; Geffen; Twizzy Rich
- Songwriters: Noah Olivier Smith; Symere Bysil Woods; Benjamin Debosnigs Saint Fort
- Producer: Bnyx

"Flawless" (stylized as "Flawlëss") is a song by American rapper Yeat featuring fellow American rapper Lil Uzi Vert. Produced by Bnyx, it was released as the opening track from Yeat's sixth extended play Lyfe (2022).

== Composition ==
The song only has one verse, performed by Lil Uzi Vert, who name-drops numerous brands that they have bought from, briefly shouts out producer Maaly Raw, and laments about the untrustworthy people around them.

== Critical reception ==
Alexander Cole of HotNewHipHop gave a positive review, writing, "In the end, both artists delivered on a high level as we were provided with a banger called 'Flawless' that will go off at any festival or party. As you will hear, the track features some ominous vocals in the background, while Yeat delivers a chorus about his extravagant lifestyle. Uzi has a long verse in the middle of the track and it features one of [their] best flows yet. The two make a great team and this track".

== Charts ==
Chart performance for "Flawless"
Chart (2022)	Peak position
Canada (Canadian Hot 100)	77
New Zealand Hot Singles (RMNZ)	18
US Billboard Hot 100	77
US Hot R&B/Hip-Hop Songs (Billboard)	24

== Certifications ==
Region	Certification	Certified units/sales
Poland (ZPAV)	Platinum	50,000^{‡}
United States (RIAA)	Platinum	1,000,000^{‡}
^{‡} Sales+streaming figures based on certification alone.
