= Pluto × Baby Pluto =

Studio album by Future and Lil Uzi Vert
- Released: November 13, 2020
- Recorded: 2020
- Genres: Hip-hop; trap
- Length: 54:30
- Labels: Freebandz; Generation Now; Epic; Atlantic
- Producers: DJ Esco; 12Hunna; Bobby Raps; Brandon Finessin; Buddah Bless; D. Hill; Dotmidorii; Narcowave; Gudda Tay; Hagan; London on da Track; Loudy Luna; Lukrative; Nils; Outtatown; Torey Montana; Turbo; Twisted Genius; Wheezy; Yung Talent; Zaytoven

Future chronology
High Off Life (2020)	Pluto x Baby Pluto (2020)	I Never Liked You (2022)

Lil Uzi Vert chronology
Lil Uzi Vert vs. the World 2 (2020)	Pluto x Baby Pluto (2020)	Red & White (2022)

Singles from Pluto x Baby Pluto
- 1. "Patek / Over Your Head" Released: July 31, 2020

Pluto × Baby Pluto is a collaborative studio album by American rappers Future and Lil Uzi Vert. It was released on November 13, 2020, and was previewed through several trailers starting from July 2020. The title signifies the combination of both artists' nicknames: Future is referred to as Pluto, as expressed through his debut album Pluto (2012), while Lil Uzi Vert identifies as Baby Pluto, as expressed through the song "Baby Pluto" from Eternal Atake (2020). It is the second project released by Future in 2020, following High Off Life. It is also the third project released by Lil Uzi Vert in the year, following Eternal Atake and its deluxe reissue, notably after their hiatus from 2018 to 2019.

A deluxe version of the album was released on November 17, 2020, four days following the release of Pluto x Baby Pluto.

Professional ratings
Aggregate scores
Source	Rating
Metacritic	67/100
Review scores
Source	Rating
AllMusic	3.5/5 stars
HipHopDX	3/5
Pitchfork	6.8/10
Rolling Stone	3/5 stars

== Background and promotion ==
Both Future and Lil Uzi Vert blanked their Instagram pages on July 21, 2020, and proceeded to upload a visual teaser directed by Hype Williams, intended to announce an upcoming project titled "Pluto x Baby Pluto". On July 31, 2020, Lil Uzi's 25th birthday, the duo released two joint songs titled "Patek" and "Over Your Head", both of which would later turn out to be on the deluxe edition of the album. On September 20, 2020, DJ Esco released a teaser trailer, titled "Astronauts", for the album. On September 22, a video featuring the two rappers playing soccer with several women was uploaded. On November 11, 2020, both artists officially announced the joint project on their social media via another trailer. The visual sees the two rappers discussing whether to leave Earth for another planet. The cover art and tracklist were revealed on November 12, 2020.

== Cover art ==
The album cover art shows two astronauts floating in a warped outer space landscape. It is a modified stock image by Sergey Nivens.

== Commercial performance ==
Pluto x Baby Pluto debuted at number two on the US Billboard 200 with 105,000 album-equivalent units (including 5,500 pure album sales) in its first week. This became Future's fourteenth US top-ten album, as well as Lil Uzi's third. The album also accumulated a total of 136.11 million on-demand US streams from all its tracks, in the week ending November 28, 2020.

== Track listing ==
Track listing adapted from Tidal.

Pluto x Baby Pluto track listing
No.	Title	Writer(s)	Producer(s)	Length
1.	"Stripes Like Burberry"	Nayvadius Wilburn; Symere Woods; William Moore	DJ Esco	4:34
2.	"Marni on Me"	Wilburn; Woods; Brandon Veal; Tobias Dekker	Brandon Finessin; Outtatown	2:13
3.	"Sleeping on the Floor"	Wilburn; Woods; Darius Hill	D. Hill; Loudy Luna	2:47
4.	"Real Baby Pluto"	Wilburn; Woods; Xavier Dotson; Deundraeus Portis	Zaytoven; Twysted Genius	3:17
5.	"Drankin n Smokin"	Wilburn; Woods; Michael O'Brien; Hagan Lange; Dwan Avery	12Hunna; Hagan; DY	3:34
6.	"Million Dollar Play"	Wilburn; Woods; Dotson; Tyron Douglas, Sr.	Zaytoven; Buddah Bless	2:47
7.	"Plastic"	Wilburn; Woods; London Holmes; Grant Dickinson	London on da Track; Lab Cook^{[a]}	3:14
8.	"That's It"	Wilburn; Woods; Wesley Glass; Nils Noehden	Wheezy; Nils	3:48
9.	"Bought a Bad Bitch"	Wilburn; Woods; Moore	DJ Esco; Chiveer^{[a]}	3:30
10.	"Rockstar Chainz" (performed by Future)	Wilburn; Torey Gilmer	Torey Montana	3:01
11.	"Lullaby" (performed by Lil Uzi Vert)	Woods; Avery; Robert Richardson	DY; Bobby Raps	4:22
12.	"She Never Been to Pluto"	Wilburn; Woods; Veal; Pierre Thevenot	Brandon Finessin; Lukrative	3:24
13.	"Off Dat"	Wilburn; Woods; Moore	DJ Esco	3:05
14.	"I Don't Wanna Break Up"	Wilburn; Woods; Hill; Dionte Wooten	D. Hill; Gudda Tay	4:04
15.	"Bankroll"	Wilburn; Woods; Veal; Thevenot; Calvin Gillen	Brandon Finessin; Lukrative; Dotmidorii	3:07
16.	"Moment of Clarity"	Wilburn; Woods; Chandler Durham; Camren Martin	Turbo; Yung Talent	3:42
Total length:				54:29

Deluxe edition (bonus tracks)
No.	Title	Writer(s)	Producer(s)	Length
17.	"Tic Tac"	Wilburn; Woods; Veal; Marvin Warren	Brandon Finessin; Alien	3:10
18.	"My Legacy"	Wilburn; Woods; Veal; Thevenot	Brandon Finessin; Lukrative	3:14
19.	"Heart in Pieces"	Wilburn; Woods; Moore	DJ Esco	3:18
20.	"Because of You"	Wilburn; Woods; Veal; Cas van der Heijden; Danny Harle; Lucy Taylor	Brandon Finessin; Loesoe	3:37
21.	"Bust a Move"	Wilburn; Woods; Veal	Brandon Finessin; ShaunGoBrazy	3:47
22.	"Baby Sasuke"	Wilburn; Woods; Veal; Rok Curkovic	Brandon Finessin; Rok; Lusi^{[a]}	3:31
23.	"Patek"	Wilburn; Woods; Veal; Anton Mendo	Brandon Finessin; Starboy	4:41
24.	"Over Your Head"	Wilburn; Woods; Hill; Corey Moon	D. Hill; TM88; DJ Moon	3:07
Total length:				82:54

Notes

- ^{^[a]} signifies an uncredited co-producer
- Tracks "Tic Tac" to "Baby Sasuke" are placed in front of the original tracklist, moving the original tracklist by 7, while "Patek" and "Over Your Head" are placed at the end
- "Because of You" samples and interpolates elements of the A. G. Cook remix of 2017 Danny L Harle single, "Me4U", featuring Morrie.

== Charts ==
=== Weekly charts ===
Weekly chart performance for Pluto x Baby Pluto
Chart (2020–2021)	Peak position
Austrian Albums (Ö3 Austria)	28
Belgian Albums (Ultratop Flanders)	34
Belgian Albums (Ultratop Wallonia)	92
Canadian Albums (Billboard)	5
Danish Albums (Hitlisten)	32
Dutch Albums (Album Top 100)	26
Finnish Albums (Suomen virallinen lista)	46
French Albums (SNEP)	57
Irish Albums (Official Charts)	28
Italian Albums (FIMI)	61
New Zealand Albums (RMNZ)	29
Norwegian Albums (VG-lista)	20
Swedish Albums (Sverigetopplistan)	49
Swiss Albums (Schweizer Hitparade)	33
UK Albums (Official Charts)	39
US Billboard 200	2
US Top R&B/Hip-Hop Albums (Billboard)	1

=== Year-end charts ===
Year-end chart performance for Pluto x Baby Pluto
Chart (2021)	Position
US Billboard 200	55
US Top R&B/Hip-Hop Albums (Billboard)	39

== Certifications ==
Certifications for Pluto x Baby Pluto
Region	Certification	Certified units/sales
Canada (Music Canada)	Gold	40,000^{‡}
^{‡} Sales+streaming figures based on certification alone.

== Release history ==
Release dates and formats for Pluto × Baby Pluto
Region	Date	Format	Edition	Ref.
Various	November 13, 2020	Digital download; streaming	Standard	
Various	November 17, 2020	Digital download; streaming	Deluxe	
