= Money Longer =

2016 single by Lil Uzi Vert

Single by Lil Uzi Vert

from the album Lil Uzi Vert vs. the World
- Released: February 6, 2016
- Recorded: 2015
- Genre: Trap
- Length: 3:18
- Label: Generation Now; Atlantic
- Songwriters: Symere Woods; Donald Cannon; Jamaal Henry
- Producers: Don Cannon; Maaly Raw

Lil Uzi Vert singles chronology
"Money Longer" (2016)	"You Was Right" (2016)

Music video
- "Money Longer" on YouTube

"Money Longer" is the debut single by American rapper Lil Uzi Vert. It was released for digital download on February 6, 2016, as the first single from their third mixtape Lil Uzi Vert vs. the World, and as a bonus track from Japanese versions of their debut album Luv is Rage 2, by Generation Now and Atlantic Records. The whole song focuses on the idea that Lil Uzi Vert has now "turn[ed] into a savage" as is repeated throughout the song. The song was produced by Philadelphia-based record producers Don Cannon and Maaly Raw.

== Music video ==
On July 8, 2016, the music video for "Money Longer" was uploaded to Lil Uzi Vert's YouTube channel, receiving over 175 million views as of July 2026.

== Commercial performance ==
"Money Longer" debuted at number 92 on Billboard Hot 100 for the chart dated July 2, 2016, becoming their first entry on the chart. As of date, it has peaked at number 54. The song was certified 7× Platinum by the Recording Industry Association of America (RIAA).

== In popular culture ==
In 2018, the song became an Internet meme where the song's bass boosted instrumental was used in various edits with a green screen video of a silver alien dancing, often referred to as "Howard The Alien", and was associated with sleep paralysis.

== Charts ==
=== Weekly charts ===
Chart (2016)	Peak position
US Billboard Hot 100	54
US Hot R&B/Hip-Hop Songs (Billboard)	15

=== Year-end charts ===
Chart (2016)	Position
US Hot R&B/Hip-Hop Songs (Billboard)	43

== Certifications ==
Region	Certification	Certified units/sales
New Zealand (RMNZ)	Platinum	30,000^{‡}
Poland (ZPAV)	Gold	25,000^{‡}
United Kingdom (BPI)	Silver	200,000^{‡}
United States (RIAA)	7× Platinum	7,000,000^{‡}
^{‡} Sales+streaming figures based on certification alone.
