= You Was Right =

Single by Lil Uzi Vert

from the album Lil Uzi Vert vs. the World
- Released: May 27, 2016
- Genre: Trap; emo rap
- Length: 2:43
- Label: Generation Now; Atlantic
- Songwriters: Leland Wayne; Symere Woods
- Producer: Metro Boomin

Lil Uzi Vert singles chronology
"Money Longer" (2016)	"You Was Right" (2016)	"Seven Million" (2016)

Music video
- "You Was Right" on YouTube

"You Was Right" is a song recorded by American rapper Lil Uzi Vert. It was released as a single for their third mixtape Lil Uzi Vert vs. the World on May 27, 2016, by Generation Now and Atlantic Records.

== Background ==
"You Was Right" received over 45 million streams on SoundCloud in the period of six months. Included in Lil Uzi Vert vs. the World as the fifth track, the song peaked on the Billboard Hot 100 at number 40.

== Commercial performance ==
The song has sold more than two million copies in the United States and was certified double-platinum by Recording Industry Association of America (RIAA) on February 26, 2018. It was previously, in 2017, certified gold and platinum on January 6 and March 2, respectively. "You Was Right" is Uzi Vert's first solo single to be certified platinum in the United States, with their second platinum-certified solo single appearing three weeks later.

== Music video ==
The official music video was released on October 5, 2016. Based on Alice in Wonderland, it features Lil Uzi Vert and Metro Boomin as Mad Hatters, with the latter handling an MPC. It was directed by Spike Jordan, showing Uzi Vert walking into a door that transforms their reality into a fantasy, with "[women] strolling in their fuzzy Puma slippers in a tea party picnic filled with stacks of cash." As noted by Complex, in the video Uzi Vert walks into a "chandelier-filled mansion with lovestruck women following [them] around." Uzi Vert's then-partner Brittany Byrd was among the women in the video.

On May 9, 2017, an animated music video, produced by SomeHoodlum, was released to YouTube with the length of a minute. It was described by The Fader as a "trippy cartoon" which features Uzi Vert "riding [their] four-wheeler down a street and off a cliff" alongside Boomin.

== Personnel ==
Credits adapted from Tidal.

- Metro Boomin – producer, programmer, songwriter
- Lil Uzi Vert – primary artist, songwriter
- Chris Athens – mastering
- Kesha "K. Lee" Lee – mixing, recording

== Charts ==
=== Weekly charts ===
Chart (2016)	Peak position
US Billboard Hot 100	40
US Hot R&B/Hip-Hop Songs (Billboard)	16
US Hot Rap Songs (Billboard)	11

=== Year-end charts ===
Chart (2016)	Position
US Hot R&B/Hip-Hop Songs (Billboard)	62
Chart (2017)	Position
US Hot R&B/Hip-Hop Songs (Billboard)	97

== Certifications ==
Region	Certification	Certified units/sales
New Zealand (RMNZ)	Gold	15,000^{‡}
United Kingdom (BPI)	Silver	200,000^{‡}
United States (RIAA)	5× Platinum	5,000,000^{‡}
^{‡} Sales+streaming figures based on certification alone.
