= Relevant (song) =

Single by Lil Uzi Vert
- Released: November 24, 2025
- Recorded: 2025
- Genre: Jerk
- Length: 2:02
- Label: Cor(e)
- Songwriter: Symere Woods
- Producers: Rima; Argenis Peguero; Trillion

Lil Uzi Vert singles chronology
"Chanel Boy" (2025)	"Relevant" (2025)	"Regular" (2025)

Music video
- "Relevant" Video on YouTube

"Relevant" is a song by American rapper Lil Uzi Vert. It was surprise released as a single on November 24, 2025, independently. Alongside the track, an accompanying music video was released on the video-sharing platform YouTube. Written by Vert, the song features genre elements from jerk and pop rap. In addition to the single, Lil Uzi Vert released another song titled "Chanel Boy". It features production by Rima, Trilla, and Trillion, common producers for Uzi. The song received coverage from multiple publications and debuted at number 45 on the US Hot R&B/Hip-Hop Songs chart.

== Background and release ==
“Relevant” was released independently on November 24, 2025, after the end of Uzi's major-label contract with Roc Nation Distribution. Billboard reported that the single appeared as part of Uzi’s new rollout of music since shifting to independent releases, appearing alongside the track “Chanel Boy. The song was released without any prior knowledge or announcement, with multiple sources describing it as a surprising release. An official music video came with the single the same day. Sources characterized the track as one of Vert’s early independent releases.

== Composition and lyrics ==
"Relevant" is a jerk song with influences from pop rap. The Face wrote that the song addresses claims that Vert had “fallen off”. The publication also described the song's "gooey hook" over "glistening, psychedelic production." Similarly, Billboard emphasized the track's chaotic production. Lyrically, the song revolves around braggadocious lines about luxury cars and women. Alexander Cole of HotNewHipHop praised the song as "dope", highlighting its similarities to Vert's older work.

== Music video ==
An official video, directed by SeeWorldTurtle, was released on the same date as the song. It contains abstract visuals, with Uzi being seen wearing various branded clothing from Balenciaga, Chrome Hearts, and Miu Miu. Skateboarding also plays a role in the video. The official video was uploaded to Lil Uzi Vert’s YouTube channel on November 24, 2025.

== Credits and personnel ==
Credits adapted from Tidal.

- Lil Uzi Vert – vocals, songwriting
- Rima – production
- Trilla – production, composition, recording engineering
- Trillion – production
- s6xman – composition
- Khalil Key – composition
- Dillon Brophy – mix engineering
- Jess Jackson – mix engineering, mixing, mastering

== Charts ==
=== Weekly charts ===
Chart (2025)	Peak position
US Hot R&B/Hip-Hop Songs (Billboard)	45
