= That's It (Future and Lil Uzi Vert song) =

2020 song by Future and Lil Uzi Vert

Song by Future and Lil Uzi Vert

from the album Pluto × Baby Pluto
- Released: November 13, 2020
- Length: 3:48
- Label: Epic; Freebandz; Generation Now; Atlantic
- Songwriters: Nayvadius Wilburn; Symere Woods; Wesley Glass; Nils Noehden
- Producers: Wheezy; Nils

Music video
- "That's It" on YouTube

"That's It" is a song by American rappers Future and Lil Uzi Vert from their collaborative studio album Pluto × Baby Pluto (2020). It was produced by Wheezy and Nils.

== Critical reception ==
Fred Thomas of AllMusic described "That's It" as a track from Pluto × Baby Pluto that is "slinking" and "especially fun, with Future and Lil Uzi Vert sounding like they can't wait to take their turn on the mic to top the other's lyrical punch lines or unexpectedly rerouted flows".

== Music video ==
The official music video was released alongside the song and album. Directed by Hype Williams, it sees Future and Lil Uzi Vert rapping on a soccer field as a women's team practices behind them, occasionally joining in with them, and also in a rainforest setting.

== Charts ==
Chart (2020)	Peak position
Canada Hot 100 (Billboard)	69
Global 200 (Billboard)	76
New Zealand Hot Singles (RMNZ)	23
US Billboard Hot 100	50
US Hot R&B/Hip-Hop Songs (Billboard)	14
