= Marni on Me =

2020 song by Future And Lil Uzi Vert

"Marni On Me"

Song by Lil Uzi Vert and Future

from the album Pluto x Baby Pluto
- Released: November 13, 2020
- Genre: Trap
- Length: 2:13
- Label: Epic
- Songwriters: Wilburn; Woods; Brandon Veal; Tobias Dekker
- Producers: Brandon Finessin; Outtatown

"Marni On Me" is a song by American rappers Lil Uzi Vert and Future as the second track from their collaborative album Pluto x Baby Pluto, released on November 13, 2020. The song was produced by Brandon Finessin and Outtatown. The song reached number 64 on the Billboard Hot 100.

== Credits and personnel ==
- Lil Uzi Vert – vocals, songwriting
- Future – vocals, songwriting
- Brandon Finessin – production, songwriting
- Outtatown – production, songwriting
- Bryan Anzel – mastering, mixing, recording
- Eric Manco – mastering, mixing, recording

== Charts ==
Chart (2020)	Peak position
US Billboard Hot 100	64
US Hot R&B/Hip-Hop Songs (Billboard)	23
