= Free Uzi =

Single by Lil Uzi Vert
- Released: March 28, 2019
- Genre: Trap; drill
- Length: 3:12
- Songwriter: Symere Woods
- Producer: DJ L Beats

Lil Uzi Vert singles chronology
"Big Racks" (2018)	"Free Uzi" (2019)	"That's a Rack" (2019)

Music video
- "Free Uzi" on YouTube

"Free Uzi" is a song by American rapper Lil Uzi Vert and was released on March 28, 2019. According to iTunes, the song was released solely under Lil Uzi Vert's name.

== Background ==
Shortly after teasing their second album Eternal Atake, Uzi announced their retirement from music on January 11, 2019. They also stated that they had already deleted the whole album. On March 25, 2019, it was reported that they returned to the studio to record new music. Various news sources reported involvement from Jay Z's label Roc Nation. "Free Uzi" was released three days later. Almost a day later, the song was removed from all streaming services due to an uncleared sample of G Herbo's 2012 song, "Gangway". Lil Uzi Vert's label claimed that it was not released legitimately, but rather a "leaked song".

== Music video ==
The song's accompanying music video was released alongside the song's official release and was directed by Qasquiat.
