= Project E.T. =

Mixtape by Future and DJ Esco
- Released: June 24, 2016
- Recorded: 2015–16
- Genre: Hip-hop; trap
- Length: 54:19
- Label: Freebandz
- Producer: DJ Esco (also exec.); Cameron Cartee; Cassius Jay; DJ Mustard; Dre Moon; DY Krazy; G Koop; JPlatinum; Metro Boomin; Southside; Twice as Nice; Tarentino; Zaytoven

Future and DJ Esco chronology
56 Nights (2015)	Project E.T. (2016)	Kolorblind (2018)

Singles from Project E.T.
- 1. "Too Much Sauce" Released: August 19, 2016

Professional ratings
Review scores
Source	Rating
Pitchfork	6.8/10

Project E.T. Esco Terrestrial is a mixtape by American rapper Future and DJ and record producer DJ Esco. It was released on June 24, 2016, on DatPiff and LiveMixtapes. Despite being featured on nearly every track, he is not the primary credited artist on the cover art; instead, the project is officially attributed to Esco, with Future credited as the host, similarly to 56 Nights.

== Critical reception ==
The mixtape received mixed to positive reviews. Israel Daramola of Pitchfork said "Future sounds a little exhausted", giving the project 6.8 out of 10.

== Singles ==
"Too Much Sauce" was released as the mixtape's lead single on August 19, 2016, on iTunes.

== Track listing ==
No.	Title	Producer(s)	Length
1.	"Project E.T. (Esco Terrestrial) (Intro)"	DJ Esco; DJ Mustard; Twice As Nice	1:44
2.	"Check On Me"	DJ Esco; DY	3:10
3.	"Right Now"	DJ Esco; Cassius Jay	4:31
4.	"100it Racks" (featuring Drake, 2 Chainz)	DJ Esco; Southside	4:25
5.	"Juice"	DJ Esco; Tarentino	3:21
6.	"My Blower" (featuring Juicy J)	DJ Esco; Tarentino	3:28
7.	"Too Much Sauce" (featuring Lil Uzi Vert)	DJ Esco; Zaytoven	3:38
8.	"Who" (featuring Young Thug)	DJ Esco; Metro Boomin	3:12
9.	"Party Pack" (featuring Rae Sremmurd)	DJ Esco; Southside	2:54
10.	"Married to the Game"	Southside	2:10
11.	"Stupidly Crazy" (performed by Casey Veggies and Nef the Pharaoh)	DJ Esco; DJ Mustard; Twice As Nice	4:06
12.	"Thot Hoe"	Southside	2:57
13.	"Super Dumb" (performed by Rambo So Weird)	DJ Esco; DY	2:46
14.	"Champagne Shower" (featuring Rich Homie Quan)	DJ Esco; Dre Moon	3:10
15.	"Deal Wit It" (performed by Stuey Rock)	DJ Esco; JPlatinum; Cameron Cartee	3:39
16.	"Benjamins Burn"	Metro Boomin; G Koop	5:08
Total length:			54:19

Sample credits

- "Right Now" contains an interpolation from "No More Pain", performed by 2Pac
