= That's a Rack =

Single by Lil Uzi Vert
- Released: April 9, 2019
- Genre: Trap
- Length: 3:57
- Label: Atlantic
- Songwriter(s): Symere Woods
- Producer(s): Oogie Mane; Nick Mira

Lil Uzi Vert singles chronology
"Free Uzi" (2019)	"That's a Rack" (2019)	"Sanguine Paradise" (2019)

Music video
- "That's A Rack" on YouTube

"That's a Rack" is a song by American rapper Lil Uzi Vert, released on April 9, 2019. It was initially recorded for their second studio album Eternal Atake, along with "Sanguine Paradise". It was produced by Oogie Mane and Nick Mira.

== Critical reception ==
Spin said the song "brims with manic energy", and Lil Uzi Vert "flows with an elasticity and abandon that's exciting and magnetic". XXL said the track features Uzi Vert's "typical array of boastful lyrics".

== Charts ==
Chart (2019)	Peak position
Canada (Canadian Hot 100)	77
New Zealand Hot Singles (RMNZ)	18
US Billboard Hot 100	76
US Hot R&B/Hip-Hop Songs (Billboard)	27

== Certifications ==
Region	Certification	Certified units/sales
United States (RIAA)	Platinum	1,000,000^{‡}
^{‡} Sales+streaming figures based on certification alone.
