= Lil Uzi Vert vs. the World =

Mixtape by Lil Uzi Vert
- Released: April 15, 2016
- Recorded: 2015–2016
- Studio: Means Street Studios (Atlanta, GA)
- Genre: Trap
- Length: 33:52
- Label: Atlantic; Generation Now
- Producer: Cubeatz; Don Cannon; Lyle LeDuff; Maaly Raw; Metro Boomin; WondaGurl

Lil Uzi Vert chronology
Luv Is Rage (2015)	Lil Uzi Vert vs. the World (2016)	The Perfect LUV Tape (2016)

Singles from Lil Uzi Vert vs. the World
- 1. "Money Longer" Released: February 6, 2016; 2. "Ps and Qs" Released: April 15, 2016; 3. "You Was Right" Released: May 27, 2016

Professional ratings
Review scores
Source	Rating
AllMusic	3.5/5 stars
HipHopDX	3.6/5
PopMatters	6/10

Lil Uzi Vert vs. the World (shortened L.U.V. vs. the World) is the third mixtape by American rapper Lil Uzi Vert. It was released on April 15, 2016, by Generation Now and Atlantic Records, serving as their second commercial release with Atlantic. The mixtape features production from Cubeatz, Don Cannon, Lyle LeDuff, Maaly Raw, Metro Boomin and WondaGurl. A sequel was released on March 13, 2020.

== Singles ==
The lead single from the mixtape, called "Money Longer" was released on February 6, 2016. The track was produced by Don Cannon and Maaly Raw.

The other two singles from the mixtape, "You Was Right" and "Ps & Qs" were released on April 15, 2016 with the rest of the mixtape. The first track was produced by Metro Boomin, and second by Don Cannon.

== Commercial performance ==
Lil Uzi Vert vs. the World peaked at number 37 on the US Billboard 200 and spent a total of 55 weeks on the chart. It also peaked at number 18 on the US Top R&B/Hip-Hop Albums chart. The mixtape was eventually certified platinum by the Recording Industry Association of America (RIAA) for combined sales and album-equivalent units of over 1,000,000 units in the United States.

== Track listing ==
Lil Uzi Vert vs. the World
No.	Title	Writer(s)	Producer(s)	Length
1.	"Canadian Goose"	Symere Woods; Jamaal Henry	Maaly Raw	3:38
2.	"Hi Roller"	Woods; Henry	Maaly Raw	4:36
3.	"Money Longer"	Woods; Henry; Donald Cannon	Don Cannon; Maaly Raw	3:19
4.	"Grab the Wheel"	Woods; Cannon; Kevin Gomringer; Tim Gomringer	Don Cannon; Cubeatz	4:56
5.	"You Was Right"	Woods; Leland Wayne	Metro Boomin	2:44
6.	"Baby Are You Home"	Woods; Wayne	Metro Boomin	3:50
7.	"Ps & Qs"	Woods; Cannon	Cannon	3:42
8.	"Team Rocket"	Woods; Cannon; Lyle LeDuff	Don Cannon; LeDuff	3:26
9.	"Scott and Ramona"	Woods; Ebony Oshunrinde	WondaGurl	3:41
Total length:				33:52

== Charts ==
=== Weekly charts ===
Chart (2016–17)	Peak position
US Billboard 200	37
US Top R&B/Hip-Hop Albums (Billboard)	18

=== Year-end charts ===
Chart (2016)	Position
US Billboard 200	168
Chart (2017)	Position
US Billboard 200	67
US Top R&B/Hip-Hop Albums (Billboard)	53

== Certifications ==
Region	Certification	Certified units/sales
United States (RIAA)	2× Platinum	2,000,000^{‡}
^{‡} Sales+streaming figures based on certification alone.
