= Shoota =

2018 song by Playboi Carti featuring Lil Uzi Vert

Song by Playboi Carti featuring Lil Uzi Vert

from the album Die Lit
- Released: May 11, 2018
- Length: 2:33
- Label: AWGE; Interscope
- Songwriters: Jordan Carter; Symere Woods; Jamaal Henry
- Producer: Maaly Raw

"Shoota" is a song by American rapper Playboi Carti, featuring fellow American rapper Lil Uzi Vert. It was released through AWGE and Interscope Records as the sixth track from Carti's debut studio album, Die Lit, on May 11, 2018. The song was written by Playboi Carti and Lil Uzi Vert, alongside producer Maaly Raw.

The track received generally positive reviews from music critics. The song debuted at number 25 on the US Hot R&B/Hip-Hop Songs, and number 46 on the US Billboard Hot 100.

== Composition ==
The song sees the rappers melodically rapping about their expensive jewelry, while Playboi Carti also rhymes about using his gun and having a crew of shooters. Lil Uzi Vert handles the first verse, while Carti performs the chorus and second verse.

== Critical reception ==
The track received generally positive reviews from music critics. Sheldon Pearce of Pitchfork praised the song, writing, "The beat never drops during the Uzi verse, creating a fascinating sort of tension; instead, he burrows into the synth bed with his melodic flows, generating his own rhythms. When the drums finally do kick in, Carti springs to life, brandishing weapons and matching Uzi's Auto-Tune. Carti's greatest gift is being interesting without doing much of anything, and here he's at his minimalistic best."

== Charts ==
Chart (2018)	Peak position
Canada Hot 100 (Billboard)	67
US Billboard Hot 100	46
US Hot R&B/Hip-Hop Songs (Billboard)	25

== Certifications ==
Region	Certification	Certified units/sales
Brazil (Pro-Música Brasil)	Platinum	40,000^{‡}
Poland (ZPAV)	Gold	25,000^{‡}
New Zealand (RMNZ)	Platinum	30,000^{‡}
United Kingdom (BPI)	Silver	200,000^{‡}
United States (RIAA)	Platinum	1,000,000^{‡}
^{‡} Sales+streaming figures based on certification alone.
