= Sanguine Paradise =

Single by Lil Uzi Vert
- Released: April 9, 2019
- Genre: Trap
- Length: 4:03
- Label: Atlantic; Warner; WEA
- Songwriter: Symere Woods
- Producers: Brandon Finessin; Oogie Mane

Lil Uzi Vert singles chronology
"That's a Rack" (2019)	"Sanguine Paradise" (2019)	"Pull Up" (2019)

Music video
- "Sanguine Paradise" on YouTube

"Sanguine Paradise" is a song by American rapper Lil Uzi Vert. It was initially recorded for their second studio album Eternal Atake. It was released as the first of two singles on the same day through Atlantic Records, Warner Music and WEA, on April 9, 2019. The song was produced by Brandon Finessin and Oogie Mane.

== Background ==
On April 17, 2019, the song was republished to streaming services using a reworked version of the song. The reworked song is the original version which was leaked before the release, initially dubbed as "Money Keep Coming In" by fans. It was leaked through hackers who sold the song to fans through Discord. The song's release represents Uzi's first song since their ongoing feud with their record label and since becoming a signee of Jay-Z's Roc Nation management firm.

Initially being a single for Uzi's second studio album, it was revealed that it would be cut from the album with the reveal of the tracklist, which excluded Sanguine Paradise.

== Composition ==
"Sanguine Paradise" features a direct sample from Mykko Montana and K Camp's 2012 song, "Do It". The horn line and drums can be clearly heard, as well as a similar rhythm and tempo. The song before being reworked was noted as having "the presence of some intense MIDI brass" while the reworked version was described as "opting for a more subdued variant." It is composed of "light piano rhythms along with trumpet beats."

== Charts ==
=== Weekly charts ===
Chart (2019)	Peak position
Canada Hot 100 (Billboard)	36
Ireland (IRMA)	70
Lithuania (AGATA)	51
New Zealand Hot Singles (RMNZ)	11
Slovakia Singles Digital (ČNS IFPI)	73
US Billboard Hot 100	28
US Hot R&B/Hip-Hop Songs (Billboard)	12
US Rolling Stone Top 100	44

=== Year-end charts ===
Chart (2019)	Position
US Hot R&B/Hip-Hop Songs (Billboard)	51
US Rolling Stone Top 100	64

== Certifications ==
Region	Certification	Certified units/sales
New Zealand (RMNZ)	Gold	15,000^{‡}
United Kingdom (BPI)	Silver	200,000^{‡}
United States (RIAA)	4× Platinum	4,000,000^{‡}
^{‡} Sales+streaming figures based on certification alone.
