= Too Much Sauce =

Single by DJ Esco featuring Future and Lil Uzi Vert

from the album Project E.T.
- Released: June 24, 2016
- Recorded: 2016
- Genre: Hip hop; trap
- Length: 3:43
- Label: A1; Freebandz; Epic
- Songwriters: William Moore; Nayvadius Wilburn; Symere Woods; Xavier Dotson
- Producer: Zaytoven

Future singles chronology
"Do You Mind" (2016)	"Too Much Sauce" (2016)	"Rivals" (2016)

Lil Uzi Vert singles chronology
"Pull Up" (2016)	"Too Much Sauce" (2016)	"Bad and Boujee" (2016)

Music video
- "Too Much Sauce" on YouTube

"Too Much Sauce" is a song by American DJ and songwriter DJ Esco featuring fellow American rappers Future and Lil Uzi Vert. Written alongside producer Zaytoven, it was released on June 24, 2016, by A1 Records, Freebandz, and Epic Records, as the lead single from Esco's mixtape Project E.T. (2016).

== Music video ==
The music video for "Too Much Sauce", directed by Rick Nyce, was released on October 14, 2016, on DJ Esco's Vevo account.

== Commercial performance ==
The single peaked at number 50 on the US Billboard Hot 100. As of 2026, it is DJ Esco's only charting single. The song was certified Platinum by the Recording Industry Association of America (RIAA) for earning 1,000,000 equivalent units in the United States.

== Charts ==
=== Weekly charts ===
Chart (2016–2017)	Peak position
US Billboard Hot 100	50
US Hot R&B/Hip-Hop Songs (Billboard)	21

=== Year-end charts ===
Chart (2016)	Position
US Hot R&B/Hip-Hop Songs (Billboard)	91
Chart (2017)	Position
US Hot R&B/Hip-Hop Songs (Billboard)	100

== Certifications ==
Region	Certification	Certified units/sales
United States (RIAA)	Platinum	1,000,000^{‡}
^{‡} Sales+streaming figures based on certification alone.
