= Chanel Boy =

Single by Lil Uzi Vert
- Released: November 24, 2025
- Recorded: 2025
- Genre: Rage
- Length: 2:38
- Label: Cor(e)
- Songwriter: Symere Woods
- Producer: ZeeGoinXrazy

Lil Uzi Vert singles chronology
"Everybody" (2023)	"Chanel Boy" (2025)	"Relevant" (2025)

Music video
- "Chanel Boy" Video on YouTube

"Chanel Boy" is a song by American rapper Lil Uzi Vert. It was surprise released as a single on November 24, 2025, independently. Alongside the track, an accompanying music video was released on the video-sharing platform YouTube. Written by Vert, In addition to the single, Lil Uzi Vert released another song titled "Relevant". It features production by ZeeGoinXrazy. The song received coverage from multiple publications and debuted at number 43 on the US Hot R&B/Hip-Hop Songs chart.

== Background and release ==
“Chanel Boy” was released independently on November 24, 2025, after the end of Uzi's major-label contract with Roc Nation Distribution. Billboard reported that the single appeared as part of Uzi’s new rollout of music since shifting to independent releases, appearing alongside the track “Relevant". On November 16, 2025 while streaming with Adin Ross, DJ Akademiks stated to Ross that Lil Uzi Vert was plotting to return soon.

== Credits and personnel ==
Credits adapted from Tidal.

- Lil Uzi Vert – vocals, songwriting
- ZeeGoinXrazy – production
- s6xman – composition
- Khalil Key – composition
- Dillon Brophy – mix engineering
- Jess Jackson – mix engineering, mixing, mastering

== Charts ==
Chart (2025)	Peak position
US Hot R&B/Hip-Hop Songs (Billboard)	43
