= Maaly Raw =

American record producer and songwriter from Philadelphia

- Born: Jamaal Talib Henry; September 26, 1994 (age 32); Philadelphia, Pennsylvania, U.S.
- Genres: Hip hop; trap
- Occupations: Record producer; songwriter
- Instrument: FL Studio

Jamaal Talib Henry (born September 26, 1994), known professionally as Maaly Raw, is an American record producer and songwriter from Philadelphia, Pennsylvania. He is best known for his work with Pennsylvania native rapper Lil Uzi Vert, having produced songs for each of their projects beginning with their debut commercial mixtape, Luv Is Rage (2015).

Henry also gained recognition for his work with ASAP Mob, having produced tracks on Cozy Tapes Vol. 1: Friends, ASAP Twelvyy's debut album, 12, and ASAP Ferg's third studio album, Still Striving. His producer tag, "Dat Be Maaly Raw!", originates from Lil Uzi Vert's 2015 song "Safe House". He has since worked with other high-profile acts including Meek Mill, French Montana, Lil Yachty, Rich the Kid, and Coi Leray, among others.

== Early life ==
Henry was born on September 26, 1994, in Philadelphia, Pennsylvania, where his mother was a teacher and his father was a computer technician. He is the youngest of four siblings, three boys and one girl. He lived in West Philadelphia, Southwest Philadelphia and Delaware County, and started producing music during his high school years when he attended Upper Darby High School. Henry was a basketball player. He stopped playing basketball in 2010 after his best friend, Quadir White, lost his life playing football. White and Henry grew up down the street from one another. Because his dad was a trumpet player in a West Philly High School band, Henry was introduced to music at a young age. In grade school, he started playing the clarinet. Much of Henry's childhood was spent in Southwest Philly with his cousin Nasir and his brother B-Jones. In West Philadelphia, Henry learned musical production through B-Jones, who had taught him to use the Fruity Loops software at the age of 17. A year later, he collaborated with a street rapper named Kur on a project, which he described as his debut as a professional.

== Career ==
He started working with local rapper Kur who introduced him to another local artist Lil Uzi Vert. Henry had produced a song by Kur featuring Lil Uzi called "I Don't Give a Fuck", which led to constant collaborations between Henry and Lil Uzi. Both Henry and Charlie Heat co-produced Uzi's debut project The Real Uzi. His first official hit came with "Money Longer" off Uzi's project Lil Uzi vs The World, which has since gone double platinum. Henry also produced the songs "Canadian Goose", and "Hi Roller" off the project. XXL and HotNewHipHop both listed Henry as a top 30 producer of 2016. Henry then went on to produce three more tracks off Uzi's next project The Perfect LUV Tape, which includes "Do What I Want", "Ghetto Flowers", and "Original Uzi". In 2018, Henry went gold with the Playboi Carti track "Shoota" featuring Lil Uzi Vert. He also went gold with Meek Mill's Championships by producing the track "Almost Slipped". He is responsible for four tracks off Uzi's follow up tape Luv is Rage 2, which went platinum. The Fader described his production style as "hurls songs forward, their momentum deftly guided by his wickedly weird and winding melodies, and drums that at once skitter across and barrel down your insides." Henry cites Lex Luger as an influence to this musical work.

== Production discography ==
=== Charted singles ===
| Title | Year | Peak chart positions | | | Album |
| Title | Year | US | US R&B/HH | UK | Album |
|---|---|---|---|---|---|
| "Money Longer" (Lil Uzi Vert) | 2016 | 54 | 15 | — | Lil Uzi Vert vs. the World |
| "No More Parties" (Coi Leray or remix featuring Lil Durk) | 2021 | 26 | 15 | 85 | Trendsetter |

=== Other charted songs ===
| Title | Year | Peak chart positions | | | Album |
| Title | Year | US | US R&B/HH | CAN | Album |
|---|---|---|---|---|---|
| "Do What I Want" (Lil Uzi Vert) | 2016 | — (Note: "Do What I Want" did not enter the Billboard Hot 100, but peaked at number one on the Bubbling Under Hot 100 Singles chart.) | — | 95 | The Perfect LUV Tape |
| "444+222" (Lil Uzi Vert) | 2017 | 60 | 30 | 91 | Luv Is Rage 2 |
| "Early 20 Rager" (Lil Uzi Vert) | 2017 | — (Note: "Early 20 Rager" did not enter the Billboard Hot 100, but peaked at number 15 on the Bubbling Under Hot 100 Singles chart.) | — | — | Luv Is Rage 2 |
| "UnFazed" (Lil Uzi Vert featuring The Weeknd) | 2017 | 84 | 42 | 71 | Luv Is Rage 2 |
| "X" (Lil Uzi Vert) | 2017 | 81 | 39 | — | Luv Is Rage 2 |
| "Dark Queen" (Lil Uzi Vert) | 2017 | 91 | 38 | — | Luv Is Rage 2 |
| "Shoota" (Playboi Carti featuring Lil Uzi Vert) | 2018 | 46 | 25 | 67 | Die Lit |
| "Almost Slipped" (Meek Mill) | 2018 | 73 | 38 | — | Championships |
| "New N3on" (Playboi Carti) | 2020 | 92 | 33 | — | Whole Lotta Red |
| "Teen X" (Playboi Carti featuring Future) | 2020 | — (Note: "Teen X" did not enter the Billboard Hot 100, but peaked at number 18 on the Bubbling Under Hot 100 Singles chart.) | — | — | Whole Lotta Red |
| "Overly" (Playboi Carti) | 2025 | 86 | 44 | 99 | Music |

== Production credits ==
- Lil Uzi Vert - The Real Uzi (2014): "Dumber", "I'm Sorry", "I Don't Know Nuffin", "Like 50", "Trappin Work"
- Quilly - Haines Street Hustler 5 (2014)
- Lil Uzi Vert - Luv Is Rage (2015): "Safe House", "Enemies"
- Lil Uzi Vert - Non-album single: "Uzi Manson" (2015)
- French Montana - MC4 (2016): "2 Times"
- Lil Uzi Vert - Lil Uzi Vert vs. the World (2016): "Canadian Goose, "Hi Roller", "Money Longer"
- Desiigner - New English (2016): "Da Day"
- Lil Uzi Vert - The Perfect LUV Tape (2016): "Do What I Want", "Of Course We Ghetto Flowers", "Original Uzi (4 of Us)"
- Rich the Kid - Keep Flexin (2016): "Liar Liar"
- ASAP Mob - Cozy Tapes Vol. 1: Friends (2016): "Runner"
- Lil Yachty - Non-album single: "Terminator" (2016)
- ASAP Ferg - Still Striving (2017): "Aww Yeah"
- Lil Uzi Vert - Luv Is Rage 2 (2017): "444+222", "Early 20 Rager", "UnFazed", "Dark Queen"
- Meek Mill - Meekend Music (2017): "Backboard"
- Meek Mill - Wins & Losses (2017): "Ball Player"
- G Herbo - Humble Beast (2017): "Black", "Lil Gangbangin Ass"
- Dave East - Karma (2017): "Feeling a Way"
- PnB Rock - GTTM: Goin Thru the Motions (2017): "New Day"
- Lil Skies - Life of a Dark Rose (2017): "The Clique", "Tell My Haters"
- Mir Fontane - "Still in the Hood" (2017)
- Ronnie Flex - NORI (2018): "Non Stop"
- Playboi Carti - Die Lit (2018): "Shoota"
- Nav - Reckless (2018): "Hold Your Hand"
- Young Nudy - SlimeBall 3 (2018): "InDaStreet", "Slimeball"
- Kur - Smked Out (2018): "Home Invasion"
- 88GLAM - 88GLAM2 (2018): "Nice Talk", "Racks"
- Meek Mill - Championships (2018): "Almost Slipped"
- UnoTheActivist - Limbus, Pt. 2 (2018): "Purgatory"
- AJ Tracey - AJ Tracey (2019): "Jackpot"
- PnB Rock - Pornhub Valentine’s Day Album (2019): "Right Now"
- MoneyMarr - YT2 (2019): "Insane"
- Izi - Aletheia (2019): "Uh, che Peccato!"
- French Montana - MONTANA (2019): "Hoop"
- Kur featuring Tierra Whack - "Oh My God"
- Playboi Carti - Whole Lotta Red (2020): "Teen X", "New N3on"
- Coi Leray - "No More Parties" (2021)
- Coi Leray - "No More Parties (Remix)" (2021)
- Aminé - TwoPointFive (2021): "Dididumduhduh"
- Lil Uzi Vert - Red & White (2022): "Flex Up", "Believe Me"
- DC the Don - "Zombieland" (2022)
- Homixide Gang - Snot or Not (2023): "C4N"
- Playboi Carti - Music (2025): "Overly"
- Lil He77 - Dot / Head 2 (2025): "No1LikeDis
- Internet Money, Sir Untre, & BabyBartier - We All We Needed (2026):"556"
