= DJ Esco =

American DJ (born 1990)

- Also known as: EscoMoeCity
- Born: William Seay Moore; December 31, 1990 (age 35); Fayetteville, Georgia, U.S.
- Origin: Atlanta, Georgia, U.S.
- Genre: Southern hip-hop
- Occupations: Disc jockey; record producer; songwriter; music executive
- Years active: 2008–present
- Labels: Freebandz; Epic

William Seay Moore (born December 31, 1990), known professionally as DJ Esco, is an American DJ and record producer. He is best known for his 2016 single "Too Much Sauce" (featuring Future and Lil Uzi Vert), which peaked at number 50 on the Billboard Hot 100. He is the personal live DJ and A&R for Future, whom he met in 2008.

== Career ==
A resident DJ at Magic City Mondays in Atlanta, Moore has worked as a DJ and A&R representative for rapper Future since meeting him in 2008. Future's mixtape 56 Nights (2015) was named after Moore's time spent in prison for marijuana possession in the United Arab Emirates. In 2016, Moore released the mixtape Project E.T., which features guest appearances from Drake, Juicy J, Rae Sremmurd, Young Thug, and Lil Uzi Vert. On March 30, 2018, Moore released the album Kolorblind, which contained frequent guest appearances from Future, as well as Nas, A Boogie wit da Hoodie, Dej Loaf, Schoolboy Q, and Rich the Kid. The album peaked at number 38 on the Billboard 200. Moore has served as an executive producer on Future's albums, Hndrxx (2017) and High Off Life (2020).

== Discography ==
=== Studio albums ===
Title	Details	Peak chart positions		
Title	Details	US	US R&B/HH	US Rap
Kolorblind	Released: March 30, 2018; Label: Freebandz, Epic; Format: Digital download, CD	38	22	19

=== Mixtapes ===
Title	Details
Freshly Baked	Released: July 14, 2011; Label: Freebandz, A1 Recordings; Format: Digital Download
Black Woodstock: The Soundtrack	Released: April 20, 2013; Label: Freebandz; Format: Digital Download
Freshly Baked 2	Released: June 26, 2013; Label: Freebandz; Format: Digital Download
No Sleep (with Future)	Released: December 17, 2013; Label: Freebandz; Format: Digital Download
56 Nights (with Future)	Released: March 21, 2015; Label: Freebandz; Format: Digital Download
Project E.T. (Esco Terrestrial) (with Future)	Released: June 24, 2016; Label: Freebandz; Format: Digital download, CD

=== Singles ===
Title	Year	Peak chart positions				Album
Title	Year	US	US R&B/HH	US Rap	US Airplay	Album
"Too Much Sauce" (featuring Future and Lil Uzi Vert)	2016	50	21	15	31	Project E.T.
"Code of Honor" (featuring Future and Schoolboy Q)	2018	—	—	—	—	Kolorblind
"Walk Thru" (featuring Nas and Future)	2018	—	—	—	—	Kolorblind

== Awards and nominations ==
=== BET Hip Hop Awards ===
Year	Nominee / work	Award	Result	Ref.
2015	Himself	DJ of the Year	Nominated	
2017	Himself	DJ of the Year	Nominated	
2018	Himself	Producer of the Year	Nominated	
