= G Herbo discography =

Hip hop recording artist discography

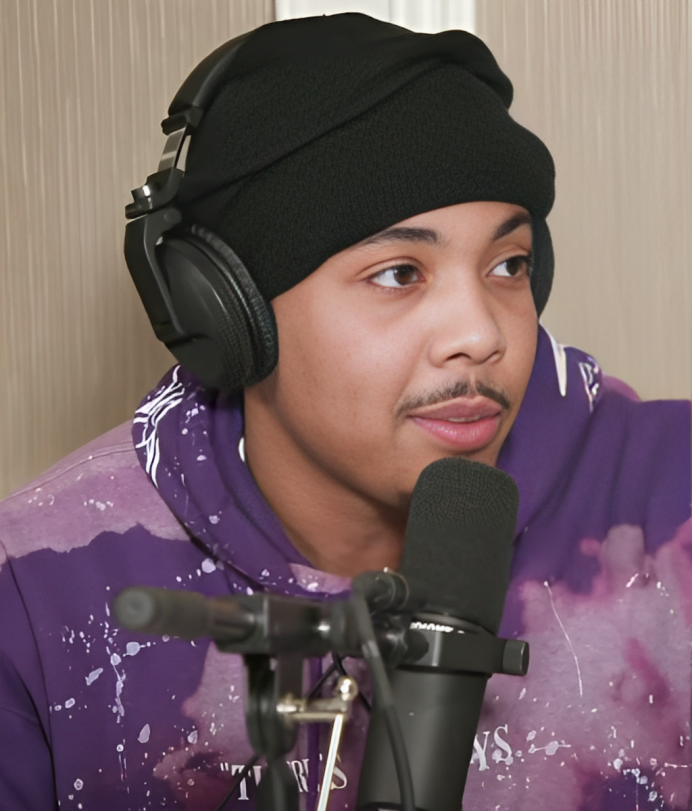
- G Herbo in 2021
- Studio albums: 7
- EPs: 2
- Singles: 40
- Mixtapes: 6

American rapper G Herbo has released eight studio albums (including one collaborative album), six mixtapes, two extended plays, and forty singles (including nineteen as a featured artist).

== Albums ==
=== Studio albums ===
List of studio albums, with year released
Title	Album details	Peak chart positions				Certifications
Title	Album details	US	US R&B/HH	US Rap	CAN	Certifications
Humble Beast	Released: September 22, 2017; Labels: Machine, 150 Dream Team, Cinematic, RED; Format: Digital download	21	14	10	—	
Still Swervin	Released: February 1, 2019; Labels: Machine, Epic, Cinematic, 150 Dream Team, 808 Mafia; Format: Digital download, streaming	41	24	22	—	
PTSD	Released: February 28, 2020; Labels: Machine, Epic; Format: Digital download, streaming	7	4	3	32	RIAA: Gold
25	Released: July 2, 2021; Labels: Machine, Republic; Format: Digital download, streaming	5	3	2	45	
Survivor's Remorse	Released: October 7, 2022 (A Side), October 10, 2022 (B Side); Labels: Machine, Republic; Format: Digital download, streaming	9	4	2	—	
Big Swerv	Released: September 6, 2024; Labels: Machine, Republic; Format: Digital download, streaming, CD	126	46	—	—	
Lil Herb	Released: November 7, 2025; Labels: Machine, Uptown, Republic; Format: Digital download, streaming, CD	15	3	2	—	

=== Collaborative albums ===
List of collaborative albums, with selected chart positions
Title	Album details	Peak chart positions		
Title	Album details	US	US R&B/HH	US Rap
Swervo (with Southside)	Released: July 27, 2018; Labels: Machine, Epic, Cinematic, 150 Dream Team, 808 Mafia; Format: Digital download	15	8	8

== Mixtapes ==
List of mixtapes, with selected chart positions
Title	Details	Peak chart positions	
Title	Details	US	US Heat
Welcome to Fazoland	Released: February 17, 2014; Label: Machine, N.L.M.B.; Format: Digital download	—	—
Pistol P Project	Released: December 26, 2014; Label: Machine, 150 Dream Team; Format: Digital download	—	—
Ballin Like I'm Kobe	Released: September 29, 2015; Label: Machine, 150 Dream Team, Cinematic; Format: Digital download	—	—
Strictly 4 My Fans	Released: November 24, 2016; Label: Machine, 150 Dream Team; Format: Digital download	—	8
Sessions	Released: December 27, 2019; Label: Machine, 150 Dream Team; Format: Digital download	100	—
Strictly 4 My Fans II	Released: April 28, 2023; Label: Machine, 150 Dream Team; Format: Digital download	124	—
Strictly for My Fans 2.0	Released: November 29, 2024	—	—
Greatest Rapper Alive	Released: December 20, 2024	—	—
"—" denotes a recording that did not chart or was not released in that territory.

== Extended plays ==
List of extended plays, with selected details
Title	EP details
Welcome to Fazoland 1.5	Released: March 17, 2017; Label: Machine; Format: Digital download
Strictly 4 My Fans 2: Road to Humble Beast	Released: September 17, 2017; Label: Machine; Format: Digital download

== Singles ==
=== As lead artist ===
List of singles as lead artist, showing year released and album name
Title	Year	Peak chart positions		Certifications	Album
Title	Year	US	US R&B/HH	Certifications	Album
"Lord Knows" (featuring Joey Badass)	2015	—	—		Non-album singles
"Get 2 Bussin" (featuring Lil Bibby)	2015	—	—		Non-album singles
"Take Me Away"	2016	—	—		Non-album singles
"Red Snow"	2017	—	—		Humble Beast
"Retro Flow"	2017	—	—		Non-album singles
"Back On Tour"	2017	—	—		Non-album singles
"Yeah I Know"	2017	—	—		Non-album singles
"I Like"	2017	—	—		Humble Beast
"Legend"	2017	—	—		Non-album single
"Everything" (featuring Lil Uzi Vert)	2017	—	—		Humble Beast
"Story Telling (Bless the Booth)"	2017	—	—		Non-album singles
"Who Run It (Remix)" (featuring Lil Uzi Vert)	2018	—	—		Non-album singles
"Who Run It (Remix)" (with Southside)	2018	—	—		Swervo
"Focused" (with Southside)	2018	—	—		Swervo
"Swervo" (with Southside)	2018	—	—		Swervo
"Bon Appétit" (featuring Z-Money and Key Glock)	2018	—	—		Non-album single
"Some Nights" (with Southside)	2018	—	—		Swervo
"Statement"	2020	—	48		25
"Break Yoself"	2021	—	—		25
"Really Like That"	2021	—	—		25
"Being Honest" (Remix) (with Kay Flock)	2021	—	—		Non-album singles
"Raining"	2023	—	—		Non-album singles
"Likka Sto 2" (with Lil Blessin featuring Travis Scott and Bia)	2023	—	—		Non-album singles
"Went Legit"	2025	70	13	RIAA: Platinum	Greatest Rapper Alive and Lil Herb
"Feet on Land" (with Moneybagg Yo)	2025	— (Note: "Feet on Land" did not enter the Billboard Hot 100, but peaked at number 17 on the US Bubbling Under Hot 100 chart.)	35		Non-album single
"GANG" (with Tink)	2025	—	—		Fuck, Marry, Kill
"Whatever U Want" (featuring Jeremih)	2025	—	—		Lil Herb

=== As featured artist ===
List of singles as featured artist, showing year released, album name, and certifications
Title	Year	Peak chart positions				Certifications	Album
Title	Year	US	US R&B/HH	US Rap	CAN	Certifications	Album
"Money and Nem" (Ceetheworld featuring G Herbo)	2014	—	—	—	—		Non-album singles
"Noone or Nothing" (Goodbye Tomorrow featuring G Herbo)	2015	—	—	—	—		Non-album singles
"Right & Wrong" (Christaun featuring G Herbo)	2015	—	—	—	—		Non-album singles
"Who Knew" (Turnpikerap featuring G Herbo)	2016	—	—	—	—		Non-album singles
"59 to 79" (Philthy Rich featuring G Herbo)	2016	—	—	—	—		Hood Rich 4
"Heaven" (Logan featuring G Herbo and Tuge)	2016	—	—	—	—		Non-album singles
"They Ain't Know" (JayKieff featuring G Herbo)	2016	—	—	—	—		Non-album singles
"Lay Me Down" (Travis Marsh featuring G Herbo)	2017	—	—	—	—		Non-album singles
"Nonsense" (Ceosonson featuring G Herbo)	2017	—	—	—	—		Non-album singles
"Just So You Know" (Rare Jamz featuring Pop and G Herbo)	2017	—	—	—	—		Non-album singles
"10 Limit" (O.P. featuring G Herbo)	2017	—	—	—	—		Non-album singles
"Pull Up" (King Deazel featuring G Herbo)	2017	—	—	—	—		Non-album singles
"Moneyman" (TGUT featuring Hoodrich Pablo Juan, G Herbo, and Tee Grizzley)	2018	—	—	—	—		Non-album singles
"Lookahere" (Bo Deal featuring Waka Flocka and G Herbo)	2018	—	—	—	—		Good Side Bad Side Pt. 2
"Onna Come Up (Remix)" (Lil Eazzyy featuring G Herbo)	2020	—	—	—	—		Rookie of the Year
"Father Figure" (The Plug & M1llionz featuring G Herbo)	2021	—	—	—	—		Non-album single
"Who Want Smoke??" (Nardo Wick featuring G Herbo, Lil Durk and 21 Savage)	2021	17	5	3	41	RIAA: 3× Platinum	Who Is Nardo Wick?
"My Everything Part III" (B-Lovee featuring G Herbo)	2021	—	—	—	—		Non-album singles
"Pop Out" (Lil Skrap featuring G Herbo and Dusty Locane)	2021	—	—	—	—		Non-album singles
"Ghetto Superstar" (Roddy Ricch featuring G Herbo and Doe Boy)	2021	—	—	—	—		Non-album singles
"Got Da Sack" (Lil Gnar featuring G Herbo)	2023	—	—	—	—		Non-album singles
"All on Me" (Lil Baby featuring G Herbo)	2025	— (Note: "All on Me" did not enter the Billboard Hot 100, but peaked at number 6 on the US Bubbling Under Hot 100 chart.)	28	17	—		Non-album singles

== Other charted songs ==
List of other charted songs, with selected peak chart positions and certifications
Title	Year	Peak chart positions				Certifications	Album
Title	Year	US	US R&B/HH	US Rap	CAN	Certifications	Album
"Glass in the Face" (featuring A Boogie wit da Hoodie)	2020	— (Note: "Glass in the Face" did not enter the Billboard Hot 100, but peaked at number 17 on the US Bubbling Under Hot 100 chart.)	—	—	—		PTSD
"PTSD" (featuring Chance the Rapper, Juice Wrld and Lil Uzi Vert)	2020	38	19	15	69	RIAA: Platinum	PTSD
"1 Scale" (Young Dolph featuring G Herbo)	2020	— (Note: "1 Scale" did not enter the Billboard Hot 100, but peaked at number 18 on the US Bubbling Under Hot 100 chart.)	45	—	—	RIAA: Gold	Rich Slave
"Chi-Raq" (with Nicki Minaj)	2021	— (Note: "Chi-Raq" did not enter the Billboard Hot 100, but peaked at number five on the US Bubbling Under Hot 100 chart.)	—	—	—		Beam Me Up Scotty
"Switch It Up" (Pooh Shiesty featuring G Herbo and No More Heroes (record label))	2021	— (Note: "Switch It Up" did not enter the Billboard Hot 100, but peaked at number two on the US Bubbling Under Hot 100 chart.)	44	—	—	RIAA: Gold	Shiesty Season
"Go Part 1" (Polo G featuring G Herbo)	2021	86	38	—	—		Hall of Fame
"I Don't Wanna Die"	2021	— (Note: "I Don't Wanna Die" did not enter the Billboard Hot 100, but peaked at number one on the US Bubbling Under Hot 100 chart.)	39	—	—		25
"Cry No More" (featuring Polo G and Lil Tjay)	2021	81	29	23	—		25
"T.O.P." (featuring 21 Savage)	2021	— (Note: "T.O.P." did not enter the Billboard Hot 100, but peaked at number four on the US Bubbling Under Hot 100 chart.)	41	—	—		25
"IDK That Bitch" (Gunna featuring G Herbo)	2022	59	22	15	79		DS4Ever
"Facetime" (King Von featuring G Herbo)	2022	92	33	25	—		What It Means to Be King
"Last Time" (A Boogie wit da Hoodie featuring G Herbo)	2022	— (Note: "Last Time" did not enter the Billboard Hot 100, but peaked at number six on the US Bubbling Under Hot 100 chart.)	—	88	—		Me vs. Myself
"Real Oppy" (King Von featuring G Herbo)	2023	—	49	—	—		Grandson
"Every Night"	2025	—	41	—	—		Lil Herb
"Reason"	2025	—	40	—	—		Lil Herb
"Longevity"	2025	—	45	—	—		Lil Herb
"Blitz"	2025	—	31	23	—		Lil Herb
"1 Chance"	2025	—	50	—	—		Lil Herb
"Code of Honor" (with 21 Savage)	2025	— (Note: "Code of Honor" did not enter the Billboard Hot 100, but peaked at number seven on the US Bubbling Under Hot 100 chart.)	24	18	—		What Happened to the Streets?

== Guest appearances ==
List of non-single guest appearances, with other performing artists, showing year released and album name
Title	Year	Artist(s)	Album
"Know Somethin'"	2013	Lil Bibby	Free Crack
"Shout Out"	2013	Lil Bibby, King L	Free Crack
"The Neighborhood"	2014	Common, Cocaine 80s	Nobody's Smiling
"Chiraq"	2014	Nicki Minaj	Beam Me Up Scotty
"Game Over"	2014	Lil Bibby	Free Crack 2
"Finer Things"	2014	Young Chop	Still
"Knucklehead"	2014	Earl Sweatshirt	Non-album song
"Ain't Heard Nuthin Bout You"	2015	Lil Bibby	Free Crack 3
"Up Next 3"	2016	Lil Yachty	Summer Songs 2
"They Know Us"	2016	DJ Twin, Lil Bibby, Sean Kingston	Day 1
"No Hook"	2017	Dave East, Don Q	—N/a
"Tote Sh*t"	2017	Playboi Carti	—N/a
"Actions"	2018	Young Sizzle	Trap Ye 2
"Time Goes Down" (Remix)	2018	Flipp Dinero	Guala See Guala
"Bon Appétit"	2018	Z Money, Key Glock	Chiraq Mogul
"No Floggin"	2018	Z Money, Key Glock	Chiraq Mogul
"Dapperdan"	2018	Aminé	OnePointFive
"Pull Up"	2018	Don Q, Dave East	Don Season 2
"Witcha"	2018	Lud Foe	Boochie Gang
"Run It Up"	2018	DDG, Blac Youngsta, YBN Nahmir	Valedictorian
"Rowdy"	2018	Vic Mensa, Korporate	Hooligans
"Independent"	2018	Don Q	Underrated
"No Flaws"	2018	Young Scooter	The Recipe
"WWYA"	2019	Charlie Heat, Lil Baby	Fireworks
"Above Average"	2019	Valee	Runnin' Rich
"Cold at Night"	2019	Slayter	Cold at Night
"Chosen One"	2019	Luh Soldier	NAW FR
"Everything's for Sale"	2019	Wale, Belly	Harlem Is Mine
"Riot"	2019	Only the Family, Lil Durk, Booka600	Family over Everything
"Murder Victim" (Remix)	2019	Lil Poppa	Almost Normal
"Purpose"	2019	Calboy	Long Live the Kings (Deluxe)
"OTF Knightmare"	2020	Trippie Redd, Lil Durk	A Love Letter to You 4 (Deluxe)
"On Yo Ass"	2020	King Von	Levon James
"Chiraq Demons"	2020	Lil Durk	Just Cause Y'all Waited 2
"Old Soul"	2020	2KBaby	Pregame Rituals
"Body Count"	2020	Mozzy, King Von	Beyond Bulletproof
"150/55"	2020	Sada Baby	Bartier Bounty 2
"1 Scale"	2020	Young Dolph	Rich Slave
"Details"	2020	Berner, Mozzy	Russ Bufalino: The Quiet Don
"Money & Hoes"	2020	BlocBoy JB	Fatboy
"So Alive"	2020	Pyrex, Southside, 808Melo	Blood on the Hills
"My Trap"	2020	Dave East	Karma 3 (Deluxe)
"Onna Come Up" (Remix)	2021	Lil Eazzyy	Rookie of the Year
"Politics"	2021	YBN Nahmir, DaBoii	Visionland
"2Face"	2021	Young Nudy	Dr. Ev4l
"Wassup with Me"	2021	Yung Mai	1.5 Way or No Way
"Switch It Up"	2021	Pooh Shiesty, No More Heroes	Shiesty Season – Spring Deluxe
"Dangerous"	2021	YG, Mozzy	Kommunity Service
"Go Part 1"	2021	Polo G	Hall of Fame
"Choppas 4 My Enemies"	2021	Yungeen Ace	Life of Betrayal 2x
"Run Down"	2021	Pop Smoke, OnPointLikeOP	Faith (Deluxe)
"Don't Leave Me"	2021	The Kid Laroi, Lil Durk	F*ck Love 3: Over You
"Idk That Bitch"	2022	Gunna	DS4Ever
"Chicago to Memphis"	2022	NLE Choppa	Me vs. Me
"Thief in the Night"	2022	Coi Leray	Trendsetter
"To the Moon (Drill Remix)"	2022	JNR Choi, Fivio Foreign, M24, Russ Millions, Sam Tompkins	Non-single remix
"Chrome, Slugs & Harmony"	2022	The Game. Lil Wayne	Drillmatic – Heart vs. Mind
"Throw Away"	2022	Fredo Bang	UNLV
"Pure"	2023	Trippie Redd	Mansion Musik
"Try & See"	2023	Doe Boy, Future, Roddy Ricch	Beezy
"Equilibrium"	2024	Lyrical Lemonade, BabyTron	All Is Yellow
"Ahhh (Remix)"	2024	Bloodhound Lil Jeff	Stepping in Blood
"No Recruits"	2024	Polo G	Hood Poet
"Built Like a Soldier"	2024	Lil Tjay	Farewell
"Code of Honor"	2025	21 Savage	What Happened to the Streets?
