= Dougie on the Beat =

American record producer (born 1996)

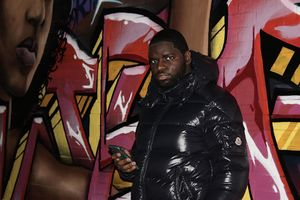
- Dougie On The Beat

Background information
- Also known as: Dougie
- Born: Douglas Kieshawn Sheref Whitehead; September 7, 1996 (age 30)
- Occupation: Record producer
- Website: https://www.dougieotb.com/

Douglas Kieshawn Sheref Whitehead (born September 7, 1996), known professionally as Dougie or Dougie On The Beat, is an American record producer born and raised in Philadelphia, Pennsylvania. Dougie has produced some of Meek's biggest singles to date, including, “1942 Flows,” “Issues,” and “Save Me," which all appear on his 2017 album Wins & Losses.

== Early life ==
Dougie began his musical career by rapping. He grew up in a large family, and recalls his dad playing and listening to a lot of Nas and Jay-Z.

As he developed his own tastes, Dougie began listening to a range of artists including Nas, Jay-Z, Scarface, Biggie, Tupac, and KRS-One.

In his teenage years, Dougie was exposed to his uncle's program called Music Development For The Youth where he learned the creative process behind making a song and how studio equipment works. It was then that Dougie claims he fell in love with producing and proceeded to make his first-ever beat.

== Career ==
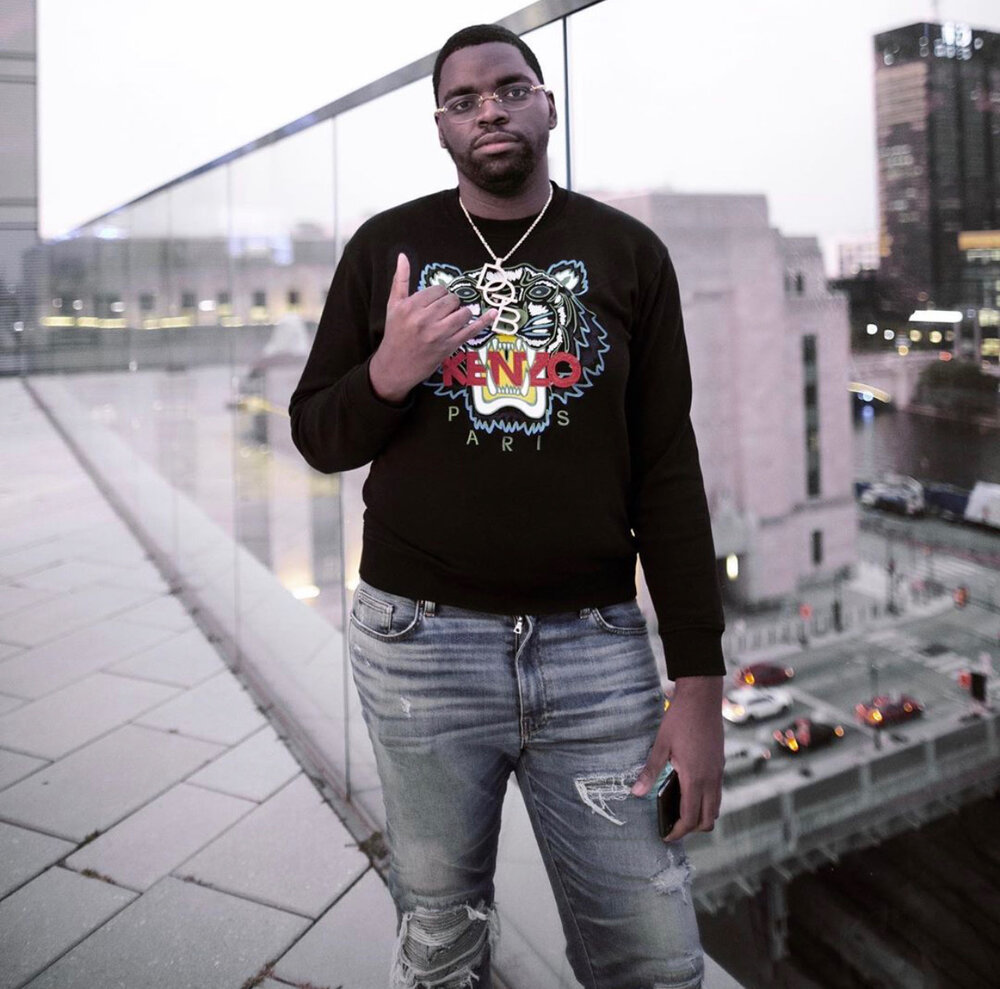
Douglas Whitehead a.k.a. Dougie On The Beat

After sending Meek Mill and his engineer beats for a year, Dougie finally met with Meek and the two released a series of popular singles resulting in Dougie's first and second placement.

Dougie prides himself in having a versatile sound that defies categorization. He told Philadelphia Weekly in 2017, “I don't really try to sound like other people. I just do what I do.”

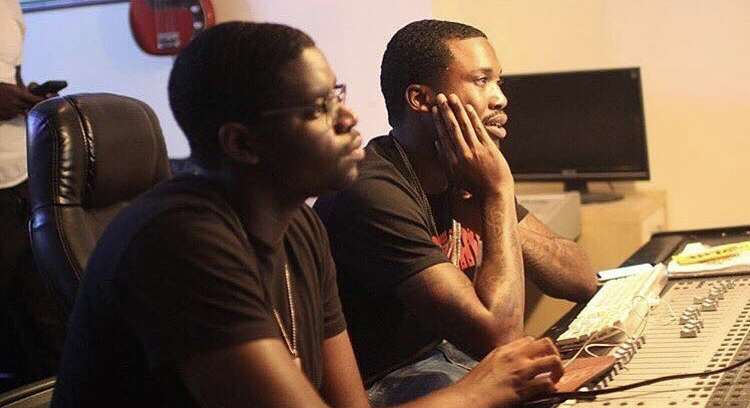
Dougie in the studio with Meek Mill

Dougie's first RIAA placement was Meek Mill's “1942 Flows,” which was certified Platinum. Meek Mill's “Issues,” was certified Gold as well. The placements were unknown by Dougie until a fan pointed out the success of the singles on social media, according to Dougie.

Other chart placements include “Feelings” off G Herbo's recent album PTSD and “Florida Boy” by Rick Ross, Kodak Black, and T-Pain.

Dougie currently has forthcoming collaborations with Dave East, Trey Songz, and Giggs among others.

== Production discography ==
Year	Artist	Album	Song(s)	Certification
2014	Quilly feat. Chic Raw	Quilly	"Life Changes"	
2014	Quilly	Quilly	"Country Boys"	
2014	Quilly	Quilly	"93 Flow"	
2014	Quilly	Quilly	"Talk Heavy"	
2015	Quilly	Quilly 3	"Way Up Top" (feat. VodKa & Every Ave)	
2016	Kur	I Hope You Feel Me	"I Hope You Feel Me"	
2016	Kur	Everything I Wasn't	"Everything I Wasn't"	
2016	Kur	Gold	"Gold"	
2017	Meek Mill	Wins & Losses	"Issues"	Gold
2017	Meek Mill	Wins & Losses	"1942 Flows"	Platinum
2017	Meek Mill	Wins & Losses	"Save Me"	
2018	Rick Ross feat. T-Pain & Kodak Black		"Florida Boy"	
2019	Jim Jones feat. YFN Lucci	Wasted Talent	"Gotta Play The Game"	
2019	Kash Doll	Stacked	"Excuses"	
2020	G Herbo	PTSD	"Feelings"	
2020	Yung Bleu feat. Yo Gotti & Flo Milli	Bleu Vandross 3	"Good"	
2021	Meek Mill	Expensive Pain	"Angels"	
2021	G Herbo	25	"No Jail Time"	
2021	Yxng K.A	Reaper Szn 2	"REAL DEAL"	
2022	Vory	Lost Souls	"Not My Friends"	
2022	DCG Brothers	Jungle Life	"Dues"	
2022	Doe Boy	Oh Really	"Perfect Timing"	
2023	Tink	Thanks 4 Nothing	"Toxic"	
2023	NLE Choppa	Cottonwood 2	"Dog Food"	
2023	Toure & EST Gee	All I Wanted Was Everything	"Ain’t Wanna Leave"	
2023	Swavy	Different Breed	"Way More Than"	
2024	Rocco	It’s All Your Fault	"Can I Vent"	
2024	Phat Geez		"No Gun Zone"	
2024	Novel & Dougie OTB		"If I Could Go Back"	
2024	G Herbo feat. Rob49	Big Swerve	"No Passes"	
2024	Dejhha		"Us"	
2024	Quando Rondo	Here for a Reason	"My Lingo"	
Total				45 songs (2× Platinum, 1× Gold)
