= Ballin Like I'm Kobe =

Mixtape by G Herbo
- Released: September 29, 2015
- Recorded: 2014–15
- Genre: Drill; gangsta rap; hardcore hip hop; conscious rap
- Length: 1:06:04
- Label: Cinematic; Machine Entertainment Group; 150 Dream Team; Sony; RED
- Producer: C-Sick; DJ L; DP Beats; Luca Vialli; Don Robb; OZ; Austin Millz; Young N Fly; Southside; DJ Pain 1

G Herbo chronology
Pistol P Project (2014)	Ballin Like I'm Kobe (2015)	Strictly 4 My Fans (2016)

Deluxe Edition Cover

Singles from Ballin Like I'm Kobe
- 1. "No Limit" Released: September 3, 2015; 2. "L's" Released: September 18, 2015; 3. "Ain't Right" Released: September 25, 2015

Ballin Like I'm Kobe is the third mixtape by American rapper G Herbo and was released on September 29, 2015. The mixtape has been downloaded over 250,000 times on DatPiff.

== Background ==
Following his debut project Welcome to Fazoland, G Herbo released a surprise mixtape by the name of Pistol P Project on December 26, 2014. On August 4, 2015, Herb announced Ballin Like I'm Kobe, dedicated to his fallen friend, Jacobi D. Herring. Herb noted that “Ballin Like I’m Kobe is just a transition. The transition of me from Welcome to Fazoland, the man I became, how I mature and what I’m going through now and the situations I been through since then."

The mixtape features production from C-Sick, DJ L, DP Beats, Luca Vialli, Don Robb, OZ, Austin Millz, Young N Fly, Southside and DJ Pain 1. It includes guest features by Lil Bibby, theMind, Sonta, J.Tsunami and Lil Durk.

== Critical reception ==
Professional ratings
Review scores
Source	Rating
HotNewHipHop	8.6/10 stars
Pitchfork	7/10 stars
XXL	4/5 stars
Consequence of Sound	8.5/10 stars

Upon its release, Ballin Like I'm Kobe received critical acclaim from critics.

Patrick Lyons of HotNewHipHop rated the mixtape an 86% saying "This is one of the most powerful tapes of the year, with tracks that grab you by the collar and shake you into submission with their soul-baring honesty. Every line Herb raps, whether political, violent, philosophical or (on rare occasions) celebratory, is cut with all the stress and sadness that's accumulated over 19 years. He truly sounds "19 years going on 39," as he says on highlight cut "Remember," on which he also succinctly sums up his "fuck the world" mentality to outsiders: "I'm already gonna die by the system, so why abide by the system?"

Sydney Madden of XXL Magazine gave the mixtape an XL (4/5) saying "On this tape, Herb seems to be even more raw and ferocious with his flow than ever. Now with a new label to call home, Herbo comes with an enlightened sense of perspective, Herb’s Ballin Like I’m Kobe paints something pretty close to an audible masterpiece. And beauty is pain, right?"

David Drake of Pitchfork gave the mixtape a 7.2/10, saying "No other song on Ballin Like I'm Kobe feels quite so one-of-a-kind. Sometimes it's pro forma; drill records like the DJ L-produced "Gang" sound as if they could have been recorded any time within the past three years. But outside of "I'm Rollin", Herbo's doesn't traffic in the kind of pioneering stylistic breakthroughs common to the first wave of drill artists—King Louie, Lil Durk, or Chief Keef. He is not drill's most versatile talent, preferring to play to his own strengths. His more traditional approach is an ability to wring narrative pathos from the song without letting his voice's cracked shell fully break. His vocal style is ragged but forceful, and in contrast with the East Coast influences to which it might be readily compared—the LOX, say—there's a sense of Herbo's words scratching past the lines, moving with a looser, less precise rhythm, as if to suggest an anxious undercurrent. And likewise, his subject matter seldom moves toward the humor of classic New York mixtape artists, preferring to shift from the autobiographical to very real-seeming threats."

Consequence of Sound gave the mixtape a B+ (8.5/10), saying “You gotta be from that to understand that,” Master P said of drive-bys and stickups early on in that interview. He was talking about New Orleans, but there's similar desperation in cities everywhere, particularly Chicago. Not everyone can relate to the specifics of Herb's struggle; the average person hasn't lost a forearm's worth of names to gun violence. With an open mind, though, it'd be hard for anyone to hear BLIK and miss Herb's desire to set a good example (give or take a few vices) for those around him. Herb illustrates a deeply human set of themes. The details within the story are what make it uniquely his.

Vibe Magazine noted that "BLIK serves as his most focused and poignant work to date, showing a more reflective and introspective Herbo in bars than heard before."

== Track listing ==
No.	Title	Producer(s)	Length
1.	"L's"	C-Sick	3:32
2.	"Watch Me Ball"	DJ L	3:24
3.	"Bricks & Mansions"	DP Beats	3:06
4.	"Bottom of the Bottoms"	Luca Vialli	3:30
5.	"P Interlude"	DJ L	0:26
6.	"Gang" (featuring Lil Bibby)	DJ L	4:17
7.	"100 Days, 100 Nights"	Southside	3:35
8.	"Peace of Mind"	Don Robb; OZ	3:02
9.	"Remember" (featuring theMind)	Austin Millz	4:06
10.	"Don't Worry" (featuring Lil Bibby)	C-Sick	3:39
11.	"Eastside"	DJ L	3:45
12.	"No Limit"	DP Beats	4:33
13.	"Struggle"	Young N Fly	3:56
14.	"Pain" (featuring Sonta and J.Tsunami)	DJ L	6:27
15.	"Rollin"	Southside	5:12
16.	"Ain't Right" (featuring Lil Durk)	DJ L	3:07
Total length:			59:28

Deluxe Edition
No.	Title	Producer(s)	Length
17.	"Waitin' for Nothin'"	DJ L	3:02
18.	"Countin' 100's"	DJ Pain 1	3:35
Total length:			1:06:04
