= What Happened to the Streets? =

- Standard cover

Studio album by 21 Savage
- Released: December 12, 2025
- Length: 47:12
- Labels: Slaughter Gang; Epic
- Producers: BoogzDaBeast; Brinx Parker; Casper; Childboy; Coupe; D.A. Got That Dope; DJ Cash; Dopamine; FnZ; Isaiah Brown; Juke Wong; Keanu Beats; Kid Hazel; LB; LedPR; Metro Boomin; MitchGoneMad; Oscar Zulu; Oz; Reske; SadPony; Shemar Pierre; Southside; Spiff Sinatra; Wheezy; Taurus; Whiskerprince; Zaytoven

21 Savage chronology
American Dream (2024)	What Happened to the Streets? (2025)

Singles from What Happened to the Streets?
- 1. "Mr. Recoup" Released: January 13, 2026

What Happened to the Streets? (stylized in all caps) is the fourth studio album by the rapper 21 Savage. It was released through Slaughter Gang and Epic Records on December 12, 2025. The album features guest appearances from Young Nudy, Latto, Drake, GloRilla, G Herbo, Metro Boomin, Lil Baby, and Jawan Harris. Production was handled by Metro himself, Wheezy, Southside, Zaytoven, FnZ, Oz, and D.A. Got That Dope, among others. What Happened to the Streets? serves as the follow-up to Savage's previous album, American Dream (2024). It was supported by the single, "Mr. Recoup", which impacted US rhythmic contemporary radio on January 13, 2026.

== Background ==
Rumors that Savage was planning to release a new album began on December 5, 2025, when an inflatable art piece in collaboration with British-Nigerian artist Olaolu Slawn was installed at an Art Basel fair in Miami Beach, Florida, with the album's acronym WHTTS, along with a pre-save link. Two days later, Savage tweeted that he would be releasing something five days later with the word: "Friday". The following day, he posted a trailer video, which features a person walking down an alley with gunmen looking for them and ending with the album's announcement. Its cover art, also designed by Slawn, was revealed when its pre-order was made available on Apple Music on the same day, revealing that it would have 14 tracks. The album's full tracklist would be revealed on December 11.

== Controversy ==
Despite original predections from chart predictors, Hits (who use data provided by Luminate), reporting first-week sales predictions of 110,000 album-equivalent units, following Billboard's official report, controversy rose regarding Billboard allegedly filtering approximately 37,000 units of the album with many fans and rappers suggesting 21 Savage and his label buying more records to boost final sales.

It has also been confirmed that Spotify removed 25 million streams from the album, this removal impacted all of the tracks on the album. Spotify has not made statements on the removal. Speculation has spread that this was due to bot activity boosting stream counts through "useless" listening.

== Critical reception ==
Professional ratings
Review scores
Source	Rating
Clash	5/10
NME	3/5 stars
Rolling Stone	3/5 stars

Reviewing the album for Clash magazine, Robin Murray wrote that What Happened to the Streets? "never quite lands, opting for atmosphere over definition", as well as "provides more questions than answers, and beneath the brash moments leaves you wondering about the rapper's longevity". Murray criticized the sampling of R. Kelly in the closer, "I Wish".

== Commercial performance ==
What Happened to the Streets? debuted at number 3 on the US Billboard 200, earning 73,000 album-equivalent units, including 25,000 pure sales.

== Track listing ==
What Happened to the Streets? track listing
No.	Title	Writer(s)	Producer(s)	Length
1.	"Where You From"	Shéyaa Abraham-Joseph; Wesley Glass; Joshua Luellen; Lucas DePante	Wheezy; Southside; Juke Wong; Nick Kobe	3:40
2.	"Ha"	Abraham-Joseph; Xavier Dotson; Radric Davis	Zaytoven	2:53
3.	"Stepbrothers" (with Young Nudy)	Abraham-Joseph; Quantavious Thomas; Michael Masser; Edward Cooper	Coupe	4:09
4.	"Cup Full"	Abraham-Joseph; Taurus Currie; Matteo Serra; Cory Cole; Jaegyeong Kim	Taurus; Serraonthebeat; DJ Cash; LedPR	3:27
5.	"Pop It" (with Latto)	Abraham-Joseph; Cooper; Alyssa Stephens	Coupe	3:17
6.	"Mr. Recoup" (with Drake)	Abraham-Joseph; Aubrey Graham; Daniel Dodd; Shemar Pierre; Lyle Winkerprins; Albert Cisneros; Emil Amos	Brinx Parker; Pierre; Whiskerprince	2:44
7.	"J.O.W.Y.H (Jump Out)"	Abraham-Joseph; Ahmar Bailey; Joseph Talamo; Luke Beasley	Kid Hazel; Oscar Zulu; LB	2:51
8.	"Dog Shit" (with GloRilla)	Abraham-Joseph; Gloria Woods; Jordan Houston; Patrick Lanshaw; Paul Beauregard; Isaiah Brown; Sterling White	IBMixing; Spiff Sinatra	3:18
9.	"Code of Honor" (with G Herbo)	Abraham-Joseph; Currie; Herbert Wright; Sade Adu; Andrew Hale; Brian Campi	Casper; Taurus	3:46
10.	"Gang Over Everything" (with Metro Boomin)	Abraham-Joseph; Leland Wayne; Michael Mulé; Isaac De Boni; Jahmal Gwin; Nayvadius Wilburn; Durk Banks	Metro Boomin; FnZ; BoogzDaBeast	4:28
11.	"Halftime Interlude"	Abraham-Joseph; Ozan Yıldırim; Jacob Reske	Oz; Reske	1:59
12.	"Big Stepper"	Abraham-Joseph; David Doman; Ezemdi Chikwendu	D.A. Got That Dope	3:13
13.	"Atlanta Tears" (with Lil Baby)	Abraham-Joseph; Dominique Jones; Jeremiah Raisen; Deshawn Jackson; Antonio Zito; Brandon Mitchell; Keanu Torres	SadPony; Childboy; Dopamine; MitchGoneMad; Keanu Beats	4:02
14.	"I Wish" (with Jawan Harris)	Abraham-Joseph; Brown; White; Jawan Harris; Robert Kelly; Keith Thomas; Honest Thomas; True Thomas; Sire Raymond; Sovereign Raymond	IBMixing; Spiff Sinatra^{[p]}; FellyTheVoice^{[v]}; K. Thomas^{[v]}	3:18
Total length:				47:12

Limited edition bonus track
No.	Title	Writer(s)	Producer(s)	Length
12.	"Trust Nobody" (with Ink)	Abraham-Joseph; Atia Boggs; Brown; K. Thomas; Aniko Thomas; Otto Marloft; White; Lesidney Ragland	Spiff Sinatra; Otto.mp3; Niko the Great^{[p]}; TooDope^{[a]}	3:14

=== Notes ===
- All tracks are stylized in all caps
- ^{^[p]} denotes a primary and vocal producer.
- ^{^[a]} denotes an additional producer.
- ^{^[v]} denotes a vocal producer.
- Limited physical editions replace "Mr Recoup" with "Trust Nobody".
- "Ha" contains a sample of "Hit Another Lick", written by Radric Davis and Xavier Dotson, and performed by Gucci Mane.
- "Dog Shit" (stylized as "Dog $hit") contains an interpolation of "Acid", written by Patrick Lanshaw, Jordan Houston III and Paul Beauregard, and performed by Lil Wyte.
- "Code of Honor" contains a sample of "Pearls", written by Sade Adu and Andrew Hale, as performed by Sade.
- "I Wish" contains an interpolation of "I Wish", written and performed by R. Kelly.

== Personnel ==
Credits adapted from Tidal.

=== Musicians ===
- 21 Savage – vocals
- Taurus – programming (tracks 4, 9)
- Spiff Sinatra – drums, keyboards, strings (8, 14); programming, vocals (8); bass, organ (14)
- IBMixing – strings (8, 14), programming (8), keyboards (14)
- Aaron Parrish-Dean – vocals (8)
- Dos Dias – vocals (8)
- D.A. Got That Dope – programming (12)
- Honest Thomas – choir vocals (14)
- Jaxon Brown – choir vocals (14)
- Levi Maze – choir vocals (14)
- Maxwell Brown – choir vocals (14)
- Sire Castello Raymond – choir vocals (14)
- Sovereign Bo Raymond – choir vocals (14)
- True Thomas – choir vocals (14)
- Brandon A. Thomas – guitar (14)
- FellyTheVoice – vocals (14)

=== Technical ===
- IBMixing – engineering (1–10, 12–14), mixing (10)
- Verne Emmanuel – engineering (3)
- Ben Hogarth – engineering (5)
- Noel Cadastre – engineering, mixing (6)
- Dos Dias – engineering (8)
- Thank Aaron – engineering (8)
- Daniel "Shebs" Sheehy – engineering (11)
- Mattazik Muzik – engineering (13)
- Anthony R. Smith – engineering (14)
- Neal H Pogue – mixing (1–5, 7–14)
- Jess Jackson – mixing (8)
- Zachary Acosta – mixing assistance (1–5, 7–14)
- Mike Bozzi – mastering (1–5, 7–14)
- Jack Doutt – mastering (6)

== Charts ==
Chart performance for What Happened to the Streets?
Chart (2025–2026)	Peak position
Australian Albums (ARIA)	23
Australian Hip Hop/R&B Albums (ARIA)	3
Austrian Albums (Ö3 Austria)	54
Belgian Albums (Ultratop Flanders)	130
Belgian Albums (Ultratop Wallonia)	178
Canadian Albums (Billboard)	12
Dutch Albums (Album Top 100)	75
French Albums (SNEP)	140
German Hip-Hop Albums (Offizielle Top 100)	16
Hungarian Albums (MAHASZ)	30
Lithuanian Albums (AGATA)	27
New Zealand Albums (RMNZ)	16
Nigerian Albums (TurnTable)	35
Norwegian Albums (IFPI Norge)	53
Portuguese Albums (AFP)	29
Swiss Albums (Schweizer Hitparade)	10
UK Albums (Official Charts)	55
US Billboard 200	3
US Top R&B/Hip-Hop Albums (Billboard)	1
