= Still Swervin =

Studio album by G Herbo
- Released: February 1, 2019
- Genre: Hip hop; drill; trap
- Length: 44:27
- Label: Machine Entertainment Group; Cinematic; 150 Dream Team
- Producer: Joseph "JB" Bowden (exec.); Mikkey Halsted (also exec.); Cubeatz; DY; DJ Victoriouz; Helluva; Jake One; J3; Oz on the Track; Southside; Tre Pounds; Wheezy

G Herbo chronology
Swervo (2018)	Still Swervin (2019)	PTSD (2020)

Still Swervin is the second studio album by American rapper G Herbo. It was released on February 1, 2019, by Machine Entertainment Group, Cinematic Music Group, and 150 Dream Team. The album features guest appearances from Gunna, Juice Wrld, among others. The production was handled by Southside, Wheezy, DY, and more.

== Track listing ==
No.	Title	Writer(s)	Producer(s)	Length
1.	"Sacrifice / Intro"	Herbert Wright III; Joshua Luellen	Southside	3:34
2.	"Scratchy & Itchy"	Wright III; Martin McCurtis	Helluva	2:58
3.	"Shakey Skit"			0:24
4.	"Up It"	Wright III; Luellen	Southside; DJ Victoriouz^{[a]}; Oz on the Track^{[a]}	2:31
5.	"Trained to Kill (Big Body Whip)" (featuring Gunna)	Wright III; Sergio Kitchens; Wesley Glass	Wheezy	2:40
6.	"Bought a Tool"	Wright III	Tre Pounds; DJ Victoriouz	3:30
7.	"Bug" (featuring Lil 40 Southside and Pretty Savage)	Wright III; Luellen	Southside; TM88	3:35
8.	"Yerk 30"	Wright III; Luellen	Southside	3:58
9.	"OK"	Wright III; Luellen	Southside; Jake One^{[a]}	2:39
10.	"Do Yo Shit"	Wright III; Dwan Avery; Kevin Gomringer; Tim Gomringer	DY; Cubeatz	3:59
11.	"Never Scared" (featuring Juice Wrld)	Wright III; Jarad Higgins; Luellen; Avery; K. Gomringer; T. Gomringer	Southside; DY; Cubeatz	3:20
12.	"Visionary"	Wright III; Daniel Anthony Ivy	Oz on the Track	3:07
13.	"Boww"	Wright III	DJ Victoriouz	3:02
14.	"Wilt Chamberlain"	Wright III; Avery; K. Gomringer; T. Gomringer	DY; Cubeatz	2:28
15.	"Hood Cycle" (bonus)	Wright III; Ivy	Oz on the Track	2:39
Total length:				44:27

Notes

- Track "Do Yo Shit" is stylized on all releases (both regular and censored) as "Do Yo Sh!t".

== Personnel ==
Technical

- Slavic Livins – mixing engineer
- Chicago Audio Mastering – mastering engineer

Notes

- ^{^[a]} signifies an uncredited co-producer

== Charts ==
Chart (2019)	Peak position
US Billboard 200	41
US Top R&B/Hip-Hop Albums (Billboard)	24
