= Where You From =

2025 song by 21 Savage

Song by 21 Savage

from the album What Happened to the Streets?
- Released: December 12, 2025
- Genre: Hip-hop
- Length: 3:39
- Label: Slaughter Gang; Epic
- Songwriters: Shéyaa Abraham-Joseph; Wesley Glass; Joshua Luellen; Lucas DePante
- Producers: Wheezy; Southside; Juke Wong; Nick Kobe

"Where You From" is a song by British-American rapper 21 Savage from his fourth studio album What Happened to the Streets? (2025). It was produced by Wheezy and Southside.

== Composition ==
The song finds 21 Savage recounting his early life growing up in East Atlanta's Zone 6, over piano-driven production that includes barking dogs in the background. He also name-drops musical artists, such as Lenny Kravitz and Travis Barker, and mentions not involving himself in the feud between two of his frequent collaborators, Metro Boomin and Drake.

== Critical reception ==
Michael Saponara of Billboard ranked "Where You From" as the sixth best song from What Happened to the Streets?. Oumar Saleh of NME called the song a "gritty headnodder".

== Charts ==
Chart performance for "Where You From"
Chart (2025)	Peak position
Canada Hot 100 (Billboard)	90
New Zealand Hot Singles (RMNZ)	7
US Billboard Hot 100	86
US Hot R&B/Hip-Hop Songs (Billboard)	14
