= DCG =

DCG may refer to:

- DCG Development, a development firm in Clifton Park, New York; owners of Clifton Park Center
- DCG Radio-TV Network, Quezon Province, Philippines
- DCG-IV, a research drug
- Definite clause grammar, a means of expressing grammatical relationships
- Democratic Montenegro (Demokratska Crna Gora), a political party in Montenegro
- Deputy Commanding General (German: Stellvertretende Kommandierende General), wartime head of a military district in the German Empire and Nazi Germany
- Digital Currency Group, is an venture capital company focusing on the digital currency market
- Discontinuous gas exchange, a physiological pattern of respiratory gas exchange used by insects
- Discounted cumulative gain, a performance measure for search engine ranking algorithms
- Doğu Çalışma Grubu, an alleged group within the Turkish military
- Guatemalan Christian Democracy (Spanish: Democracia Cristiana Guatemalteca), a political party
- BCCM/DCG, a diatom collection part of the Belgian Co-ordinated Collections of Micro-organisms
- The DCG Brothers, a Chicago based Hip Hop duo.

== See also ==
- Digital collectible card game (DCCG)
