= Trap Ye: Season 2 =

Mixtape by Southside
- Released: February 2, 2018
- Genre: Hip hop; trap
- Length: 1:01:44
- Label: Self-released
- Producer: 2AM; BasedKash; Cubeatz; Deedotwill; DMC; DY; Fonzie Beats; G Koop; Gezin; Grimlin; HiToppBraxkin; Hussein; Jake One; Larry David; Max Lord; Philty Beatz; Purps; Pyrex; Rex Kudo; Southside; Tre Pounds; V1T0; Wheezy; WondaGurl

Southside chronology
Trap Ye (2017)	Trap Ye: Season 2 (2018)

Trap Ye: Season 2 is the second mixtape released by record producer and rapper Southside. The 20-track project has production from the 808 Mafia and features from rappers, G Herbo, Playboi Carti, and Bookie T. The mixtape was dropped on Southside's 29th birthday.

== Background ==
Trap Ye: Season 2 is the sequel to its first mixtape Trap Ye.

== Critical reception ==
DatPiff gave the mixtape a 4.5 star rating out of 5. The popular hip-hop website HotNewHipHop gave the mixtape a 4.4 out of 5 star rating.

Professional ratings
Review scores
Source	Rating
HotNewHipHop	4.4/5
DatPiff	90%

== Track listing ==
No.	Title	Writer(s)	Producer(s)	Length
1.	"Trap Ye: Season 2"	Joshua Luellen; Robert Mandell	Southside; G Koop	2:55
2.	"Actions" (featuring G Herbo)	Luellen; Herbert Wright III; Jacob Dutton	Southside; Jake One	2:58
3.	"Aint Doin That" (featuring Playboi Carti)	Luellen; Jordan Carter; Max Lord	Lord	2:52
4.	"Talkin"	Luellen	Grimlin	3:09
5.	"Fosho Fosho"	Luellen	Fonzie Beats; Hussein808	2:33
6.	"Pt I./Won't Play"	Luellen; Ebony Oshunrinde; Jared Macintyre; Filip Gežin; Larry David	WondaGurl; 2AM; Gezin; David	3:21
7.	"They Gone Repeat It"	Luellen	Grimlin	2:27
8.	"Funnel Cake" (featuring Bookie T)	Luellen	Fonzie Beats; Philty Beatz	3:05
9.	"Grand Slam"	Luellen	DMC; Pyrex	3:27
10.	"Ball Game"	Luellen; Nathaniel Caserta	Purps	3:18
11.	"Bad Bitches"	Luellen; Dwan Avery	DY Krazy	2:53
12.	"Flex The Bag"	Luellen; Jeff LaCroix	Tre Pounds; Deedotwill	3:12
13.	"Cappin"	Luellen; Thomas Sanders	BasedKash	2:29
14.	"Roll It Up"	Luellen	HiToppBraxkin	3:15
15.	"Pt.II/Murder They Wrote"	Luellen; Gežin; David; Kevin Gomringer; Tim Gomringer	Gezin; David; Cubeatz	3:30
16.	"OD"	Luellen; Wesley Glass; Masamune Kudo	Wheezy; Rex Kudo	2:07
17.	"Problem Solver"	Luellen; Sanders	BasedKash	2:57
18.	"Envious"	Luellen	Southside	4:04
19.	"Keepin It Real"	Luellen; Lord	Lord	4:03
20.	"Blessing"	Luellen; Gežin	Gezin; V1T0	3:12
Total length:				1:01:44
