= Swervo =

Studio album by G Herbo and Southside
- Released: July 27, 2018
- Genres: Hip hop; trap
- Length: 46:42
- Labels: Machine; Epic; Cinematic; 150 Dream Team; 808 Mafia
- Producers: Joseph "JB" Bowden (exec.); Mikkey Halsted (also exec.); Chopsquad DJ; Cubeatz; Jake One; Max Lord; Southside; Taso; TM88

G Herbo and Southside chronology
Humble Beast (2017)	Swervo (2018)	Still Swervin (2019)

Singles from Swervo
- 1. "Who Run It" Released: April 12, 2018; 2. "Focused" Released: May 24, 2018; 3. "Swervo" Released: June 21, 2018; 4. "Some Nights" Released: July 26, 2018

Swervo is a collaborative studio album by American rapper G Herbo and record producer Southside. It was released on July 27, 2018, by Machine Entertainment Group, Epic Records, Cinematic Music Group, 150 Dream Team and 808 Mafia. The production on the album was entirely handled by Southside, alongside Jake One and TM88, among others. The album also features guest appearances from 21 Savage, Chief Keef, Juice WRLD and Young Thug.

Swervo was supported by four singles: "Who Run It", "Focused", "Swervo" and "Some Nights". The album received positive reviews from music critics. It debuted at number 15 on the US Billboard 200 chart, earning 22,000 album-equivalent units in its first week. Its sequel album, Still Swervin, was released on February 1, 2019.

== Background ==
On September 11, 2017, G Herbo was featured in an interview with XXL, in which he spoke about the project, he said:

As far as when I'm gonna drop that with Southside too, that's coming this year. So, as far as music, bro, I got a lot of good stuff in the pipeline. I just been making sure it's right with the timing. The Southside project...that's going to be one of my biggest projects, hands down. It's going to give me an entire different fan base. I feel like I'll be capturing the entire South with that project. It's all about timing and just strategizing, making sure we're hitting A, B, C and all the way on to Z. I don't want to skip no steps or force nothing. Everything got to be natural and organic."

The album's tracklist, cover art and release date was revealed on July 20, 2018. The announcement comes a month after G Herbo and Southside released the music video for the title track. G Herbo described Swervo as his "alter-ego" and the "opposite of G Herbo". He further commented on the project during an interview with Billboard detailing the concept of him "having fun and party records." In an interview with Complex, G Herbo talked about how the project came about, by saying:

"Southside, who produced the whole album, came up with the name. We would hook up in Atlanta, Miami, or L.A. and just hop in $200K whips, swerv thru traffic—really just have fun and enjoy life—then go to the lab and capture that feeling. It's that vibe. I can't get that feeling in Chicago, because Chicago ain't a place you can relax and let your guard down. Not even for a second. Don't get me wrong, I still talk that street talk, because that who I am at my core, but on this album I'm still having fun with it at the same time."

== Artwork ==
The album's artwork features G Herbo and Southside wearing custom-made jackets, sitting on a top of a white Rolls-Royce Ghost. It draws inspiration from Eric B. & Rakim's 1988 album Follow the Leader.

== Singles ==
The album lead single, "Who Run It" was released on April 12, 2018. The second single, "Focused" featuring Southside was released on May 24, 2018. The third single, "Swervo" featuring Southside was released on June 21, 2018, accompanied by the JMP-directed music video. The fourth single, "Some Nights" was released on June 26, 2018.

== Critical reception ==
Professional ratings
Review scores
Source	Rating
HipHopDX	3.5/5
HotNewHipHop	84%
Pitchfork	7.3/10

Narsimha Chintaluri of HipHopDX stated that "G Herbo's travels outside of Chicago and his comfort zone felt natural and necessary." "Unlike his debut, Herbo's content on Swervo is more compartmentalized; a majority of the tracks here are strictly meant for the young man to vent and talk his CEO boss shit." In addition, Chintaluri stated that "Humble Beast presented a stark look at survivor's guilt, Swervo mainly attempts to represent the flipside – leaving Herbo free to finally revel in success." Trevor Smith of HotNewHipHop stated that "the 22-year-old rapper only continues to grow. Really, there's no limit." Sheldon Pearce of Pitchfork stated that "He delivers some of his starkest verses like a steamroller, almost completely desensitized. This daredevil approach to gunplay and cadences makes him seem unbreakable, but the longer the album goes on, the more it wears on you. Swervo is all velocity. He delivers high-powered, stampeding stanzas looking to bum-rush you before you even know what happened."

== Commercial performance ==
Swero debuted at number 15 on the US Billboard 200 chart, earning 22,000 album-equivalent units (including 3,000 copies as pure album sales) in its first week. The album also accumulated a total of 25.4 million on-demand streams from the set's tracks that week.

== Track listing ==
All tracks written by Herbert Wright III and Joshua Luellen, and produced by Southside, except where noted.

No.	Title	Writer(s)	Producer(s)	Length
1.	"Some Nights"	Wright III; Luellen	Southside; Chopsquad DJ^{[a]}	3:18
2.	"Swervo"	Wright III; Luellen; Bryan Simmons	Southside; TM88^{[a]}	3:12
3.	"How I Grew Up" (featuring 21 Savage)	Wright III; Luellen; Shayaa Joseph		3:40
4.	"FoReal"	Wright III; Luellen	Southside; Cubeatz^{[a]}	2:38
5.	"Catch Up" (featuring Chief Keef)			3:10
6.	"Tweakin (Head)"			3:01
7.	"Pac n Dre"	Wright III; Luellen; Simmons	Southside; TM88^{[a]}	3:14
8.	"Bonjour"	Wright III; Luellen; Simmons	Southside; TM88^{[a]}; Jake One^{[a]}	3:32
9.	"Huh"	Wright III; Luellen; Max Adam Lord	Southside; Max Lord^{[a]}; Taso^{[a]}	3:21
10.	"100 Sticks" (featuring Young Thug)			3:46
11.	"Honestly" (featuring Juice Wrld)	Wright III; Luellen; Jarad Higgins	Southside; Jake One^{[a]}	3:34
12.	"Letter"		Southside; Cubeatz^{[a]}	4:45
13.	"Focused"		Southside; Jake One^{[a]}	2:43
14.	"Who Run It (Remix)"	Wright III; Luellen; Jordan Houston; William Hart; Thom Bell; Paul Beauregard		2:48
Total length:				46:42

Notes

- ^{^[a]} signifies an uncredited co-producer

Sample credits

- "Who Run It (Remix)" contains a sample from "Who Run It", performed by Three 6 Mafia.

== Personnel ==
Credits adapted from album's back cover.

Technical

- Max Lord – recording, mixing
- Tony Wilson – editing
- Slavic Livins – Mastering engineer (for Chicago Audio Mastering)

Additional personnel

- Oscar "YT Designs" Galvan – art direction, design
- TeeJay Spencer – art direction, design
- Rowdee "TheManBehindCovers" – art direction, design

== Charts ==
Chart (2018)	Peak position
US Billboard 200	15
US Independent Albums (Billboard)	7
US Top R&B/Hip-Hop Albums (Billboard)	8
US Top Rap Albums (Billboard)	8
