= Ha (21 Savage song) =

2025 song by 21 Savage

Song by 21 Savage

from the album What Happened to the Streets?
- Released: December 12, 2025
- Genre: Hip-hop
- Length: 2:53
- Label: Slaughter Gang; Epic
- Songwriters: Shéyaa Abraham-Joseph; Xavier Dotson; Radric Davis
- Producer: Zaytoven

Music video
- "Ha" on YouTube

"Ha" is a song by British-American rapper 21 Savage, released on December 12, 2025, from his fourth studio album What Happened to the Streets? along with a music video. Produced by Zaytoven, it contains a sample of Gucci Mane's 2015 song "Hit Another Lick", which itself was also produced by Zaytoven. The song finds Savage threatening his enemies and taking aim at people he considers "fake" rappers who make no progress.

== Critical reception ==
Michael Saponara of Billboard placed "Ha" at number 12 in his ranking of the songs from What Happened to the Streets?. Robin Murray of Clash commented that the song "feels formless, the chorus simplistic". Vivian Medithi of The Fader described that the song's sample as "is more karaoke than homage but still sounds pretty good all things considered."

== Charts ==
Chart performance for "Ha"
Chart (2025)	Peak position
New Zealand Hot Singles (RMNZ)	11
US Billboard Hot 100	77
US Hot R&B/Hip-Hop Songs (Billboard)	11
