= 25 (G Herbo album) =

Studio album by G Herbo
- Released: July 2, 2021
- Genre: Trap
- Length: 57:24
- Label: Machine; Republic
- Producer: Chase Davis; Daniel Ivy; DeAvonte Kimble; Don Cannon; Dougie on the Beat; Hitmaka; Hollywood Cole; Jake One; Luca Vialli; Ramsey Beatz; SkipOnDaBeat; Southside; Tay Keith; Turbo

G Herbo chronology
| PTSD (2020) | 25 (2021) | Survivor's Remorse (2022) |

Singles from 25
- 1. "Statement" Released: December 18, 2020; 2. "Really Like That"/"Break Yoself" Released: March 5, 2021

25 is the fourth studio album by American rapper G Herbo. It was released on July 2, 2021, by Machine Entertainment and Republic Records. The album contains guest appearances from Polo G, Lil Tjay, 21 Savage, the Kid Laroi, Gunna, G Herbo's son Yosohn, and Rowdy Rebel. Production was handled by Southside, Ramsey Beatz, Chase Davis, Daniel Ivy, Hitmaka, SkipOnDaBeat, Turbo, Dougie on the Beat, Don Cannon, Tay Keith, Luca Vialli, Jake One, Hollywood Cole, and DeAvonte Kimble. The album serves as the follow-up to G Herbo's previous album, PTSD (2020). It was supported by three singles, "Statement", "Really Like That", and "Break Yoself", all of which are included as bonus tracks on the album. The album's title comes from G Herbo being 25 years old at the time of its release, and the death of a friend a week prior to his 25th birthday.

== Background ==
The album is named after G Herbo's age at the time, 25. The title and number are important to him because his brother and fellow rapper, Gregory Jackson, known professionally as Lil Greg, died on January 28, exactly one week before he turned 25 years old on February 4. Comparing the album to his previous album, PTSD (2020), G Herbo stated that 25 sees him "in a different headspace" and he is "telling the story of where I am now and where I come from turning 25 years old". On the album, he "digs deep and speaks about his upbringing, his losses, his troubles, and his come-up in the rap game". He is also "celebrating his 25th year around the sun and reflecting on everything he's learned along the way". HipHopDX said G Herbo "harnesses the pain and transforms it into heartfelt trap ballads".

== Release and promotion ==
On June 25, 2021, G Herbo announced the album along with its cover art and release date through a trailer video, while the tracklist also got leaked. He revealed the tracklist on June 30, 2021.

=== Singles ===
The lead single of the album, "Statement", was released on December 18, 2020. "Really Like That" and "Break Yoself" were released as the dual second singles on March 5, 2021. The singles are the last three tracks of the album in order.

== Critical reception ==
Professional ratings
Review scores
| Source | Rating |
|---|---|
| AllMusic | 3.5/5 stars |
| Clash | 8/10 |

Fred Thomas of AllMusic stated that the album contains "plenty of autobiographical content centered around pain and loss", with "Cry No More" standing out as one of the strongest tracks. Thomas praised the "slick" production on the album and opined that the variety in instrumentals helps maintain the listener's interest throughout. Thomas concluded his review by writing that "some of the best tracks are those where guests join in", singling out the tracks "You Can't" and "T.O.P" as particular highlights. Robin Murray of Clash praised the album and opined that it showcases Herbo's talent as an innovative rap artist. Murray also praised the collaborations and concluded his review by writing that 25 is a "record of breadth and distillation" and that Herbo finds himself "entering rap's A League on his own terms".

== Commercial performance ==
25 debuted at number five on the US Billboard 200, earning 46,000 album-equivalent units and becoming G Herbo's second top 10 and highest-charting album.

== Track listing ==
25 track listing
| No. | Title | Writer(s) | Producer(s) | Length |
|---|---|---|---|---|
| 1. | "I Don't Wanna Die" | Herbert Wright III | Southside; Cubeatz^{[a]} | 2:25 |
| 2. | "Cry No More" (with Polo G and Lil Tjay) | H. Wright; Taurus Bartlett; Tione Merritt | Ramsey Beatz | 3:41 |
| 3. | "Stand the Rain" | H. Wright | Chase Davis; OzOnTheTrack^{[a]} | 2:22 |
| 4. | "T.O.P." (featuring 21 Savage) | H. Wright; Shayaa Abraham-Joseph | Hitmaka; SkipOnDaBeat; Cris Serrano^{[a]} | 2:40 |
| 5. | "You Can't" (with The Kid LAROI and Gunna) | H. Wright; Charlton Howard; Sergio Kitchens | Turbo | 2:27 |
| 6. | "No Jail Time" | H. Wright | Dougie on the Beat | 3:05 |
| 7. | "Cold World" (featuring Yosohn) | H. Wright; Yosohn Wright | Davis | 3:11 |
| 8. | "Whole Hearts" | H. Wright | Don Cannon | 2:26 |
| 9. | "2 Chains" | H. Wright | Tay Keith | 4:04 |
| 10. | "Drill" (with Rowdy Rebel) | H. Wright; Chad Marshall | Luca Vialli | 2:44 |
| 11. | "Trenches Know My Name" | H. Wright | Southside; Henney Major^{[a]}; Gredy^{[a]} | 4:00 |
| 12. | "Doughboy" | H. Wright | Davis | 2:48 |
| 13. | "Demands" | H. Wright | Southside; Cubeatz^{[a]} | 3:37 |
| 14. | "Loyalty" | H. Wright | Jake One | 2:21 |
| 15. | "Pray 4 My Enemies" | H. Wright | Southside; Shottie^{[a]} | 3:22 |
| 16. | "Turning 25" | H. Wright | Ramsey Beatz | 2:41 |
| 17. | "Statement" | H. Wright | Hollywood Cole; Southside^{[a]} | 2:20 |
| 18. | "Really Like That" | H. Wright | Tay Keith | 2:49 |
| 19. | "Break Yoself" | H. Wright | Topp | 3:11 |
| Total length: | | | | 57:24 |

Notes

- ^{^[a]} signifies an uncredited co-producer.

== Charts ==
=== Weekly charts ===
Chart performance for 25
| Chart (2021) | Peak position |
|---|---|
| Canadian Albums (Billboard) | 45 |
| US Billboard 200 | 5 |
| US Top R&B/Hip-Hop Albums (Billboard) | 3 |

=== Year-end charts ===
Year-end chart performance for 25
| Chart (2021) | Position |
|---|---|
| US Top R&B/Hip-Hop Albums (Billboard) | 90 |
