= Survivor's Remorse (album) =

2022 studio album by G Herbo

Studio album by G Herbo
- Released: October 7, 2022
- Length: 73:45
- Label: Machine; Republic
- Producer: ATL Jacob; Boi-1da; Bordeaux; C-Sick; CameOne; Chopsquad DJ; D.A. Got That Dope; Daniel Levin; DJ L; Don Rob; DrtWrk; FaxOnly; Gerson Zaragoza; Go Grizzly; Hollywood Cole; Kola Adigun; Landstrip Chip; Luca Velli; Non Native; Oz on the Track; Rowan; Shottie; Southside; Supah Mario; Taurus; Thelonious Martin; Topp; Xz

G Herbo chronology
25 (2021)	Survivor's Remorse (2022)	Strictly 4 My Fans II (2023)

Singles from Survivor's Remorse
- 1. "Me, Myself & I" Released: September 9, 2022; 2. "Blues" Released: September 16, 2022

Survivor's Remorse is the fifth studio album by American rapper G Herbo. A double album, the A Side was released on October 7, 2022, and the B Side was released three days later. The album features guest appearances from his two sons Essex and Yosohn, Jeremih, Offset, Future, Benny the Butcher, Gunna, A Boogie wit da Hoodie, Young Thug, Conway the Machine, and Kodak Black.

== Commercial performance ==
Survivor’s Remorse debuted at number nine on the US Billboard 200, earning 27,500 album-equivalent units, (including 500 copies as pure album sales) in its first week. This became Herbo's third US top ten album on the chart. The album also accumulated a total of 36.4 million streams that week.

== Track listing ==
Survivor's Remorse: A Side track listing
No.	Title	Writer(s)	Producer(s)	Length
1.	"FWM" (with Yosohn)	Herbert Wright III; Robert Fairfax III; Michael Suski; Carlos Martin; Kameron Cole; Walter Sigler	FaxOnly; DrtWrk; Rowan; Hollywood Cole	2:21
2.	"Flashbacks" (featuring Jeremih)	Wright; Jeremy Felton; Kanye West; Eric Hudson; Cole; Jordan Holt-May; Demario Priester; Kevin Price	Hollywood Cole; Landstrip Chip; Supah Mario; Go Grizzly	2:53
3.	"Aye" (featuring Offset)	Wright; Kiari Cephus; David Doman; Daniel Levin; Kola Adigun	D.A. Got That Dope; Levin; Adigun	2:11
4.	"Blues" (featuring Future)	Wright; Nayvadius Wilburn; Jacob Canady	ATL Jacob	2:25
5.	"Shaderoom"	Wright; Joshua Luellen	Southside	2:33
6.	"4 Minutes of Hell, Pt. 6"	Wright; Daniel Ivy; Ethan Hayes	Oz on the Track; Haze; Fridayy	4:39
7.	"Real Rap" (featuring Benny the Butcher)	Wright; Jeremie Pennick; Hijo de Ramon; Holland–Dozier–Holland	CameOne; Gerson Zaragoza; Thelonious Martin	3:13
8.	"Paid" (with Essex)	Wright; Luellen	Southside	2:38
9.	"Shordie" (featuring Gunna)	Wright; Sergio Kitchens; Ivy	Oz on the Track; Don Rob; Martin	2:56
10.	"After That"	Wright; Darrel Jackson	Chopsquad DJ	2:55
11.	"Outside Looking In"	Wright; Matthew Samuels	Boi-1da	3:59
12.	"Survivor's Outro"	Wright; Luca Velli; Ashot Akopian	Velli; Shottie	2:50

Survivor's Remorse: B Side track listing
No.	Title	Writer(s)	Producer(s)	Length
1.	"Sleepless Nights"	Wright; Charles Dumazer	C-Sick	2:18
2.	"History"	Wright; Londen Buckner	DJ L	2:46
3.	"Change (Gun Shots)"	Wright; Dumazer	C-Sick	2:25
4.	"Me, Myself & I" (featuring A Boogie wit da Hoodie)	Wright; Artist Dubose; Brendan Walsh; Luis Campozano, Jr.	Bordeaux; Non Native	3:41
5.	"Breathe Slow" (featuring Young Thug)	Wright; Jeffery Williams; Taurus Currie, Jr.	Taurus	3:36
6.	"No Guts, No Glory"	Wright; Luellen	Southside	2:45
7.	"Machines" (featuring Conway the Machine)	Wright; Demond Price; Thelonious Martin; Gary Wilson	Martin	3:44
8.	"Torn"	Wright; Luellen	Southside	2:54
9.	"It's Something in Me"	Wright; Dumazer	C-Sick	2:42
10.	"Him"	Wright; Dumazer; Freddie Gorman; Janie Bradford	C-Sick	2:40
11.	"All That" (featuring Kodak Black)	Wright; Bill Kapri; Canady	ATL Jacob	1:49
12.	"Remorse Outro"	Wright; Ivy; Damon Jackson; Carvena Jones	Oz on the Track	2:14
13.	"Letter to Juice"	Wright; DeAvonte Kimble; Chris Townend	Topp; Xz	4:29

== Charts ==
Chart performance for Survivor's Remorse
Chart (2022)	Peak position
US Billboard 200	9
US Top R&B/Hip-Hop Albums (Billboard)	4
US Top Rap Albums (Billboard)	2
