= PTSD (G Herbo song) =

2020 song by G Herbo featuring Juice Wrld, Lil Uzi Vert and Chance the Rapper

Song by G Herbo featuring Juice WRLD, Lil Uzi Vert, and Chance the Rapper

from the album PTSD
- Released: February 28, 2020
- Recorded: 2019
- Genre: Hip hop
- Length: 3:52
- Label: Machine
- Songwriters: Herbert Wright III; Jarad Higgins; Symere Woods; Chancellor Bennett; David Doman; Christopher Torpey; James Lavigne; Mikkey Nance
- Producer: D.A. Got That Dope

"PTSD" is a song by American rapper G Herbo featuring fellow American rappers Juice Wrld, Lil Uzi Vert, and Chance the Rapper. It was released on February 28, 2020, from G Herbo's third studio album of the same name (2020). The song was produced by D.A. Got That Dope, and the song features additional writing credits from him, Christopher Torpey, James Lavigne, and Mikkey Nance.

It peaked at number 38 on the Billboard Hot 100, becoming G Herbo's first and highest-charting song. The song also charted at number 69 on the Canadian Hot 100, number 22 on the New Zealand Hot Singles chart, and number 19 on the Hot R&B/Hip-Hop Songs chart in the United States of America. The song was also certified gold by Recorded Music NZ (RMNZ) and was certified platinum by the Recording Industry Association of America (RIAA).

== Background ==
In an interview with Rolling Stone, G Herbo described the song's collaboration as "natural", further stating, "I was hounding him — I had to make sure Juice recorded the hook. Once he recorded the hook, we knew we had a smash. Then Chance came naturally and Uzi as well. Everybody recorded their part right in front of me."

"PTSD" is Juice Wrld's second posthumous release, following his feature on Eminem's "Godzilla".

== Composition ==
The song is about the trauma which the rappers have experienced and its effects, such as mental health issues, and features an "eerie" guitar-driven instrumental with "bubbly drums". It opens with the chorus, sung by Juice Wrld: "I turn the news on, when I smell death in the air / I prove you wrong, I made it out of here". G Herbo reflects on his own experience of seeing his friends die. Next, Chance the Rapper details witnessing shootings, murder (including that of his mother), and robbery, while Lil Uzi Vert touches on their paranoia as a result of PTSD.

== Critical reception ==
The song received generally positive reviews. Critics have praised Juice Wrld's singing of the chorus and described it as sounding even more sadder given his death in December 2019. Fred Thomas called it a "mesmerizing melodic hook". Mitch Findlay of HotNewHipHop praised the production of the song, calling it "melancholic yet hopeful". In a HipHopDX review of PTSD, Josh Svetz regarded Lil Uzi Vert's verse as unnecessary and writing that it "takes away from the sentiment of the song, spitting vapid and on the nose bars devoid of detail." However, Svetz went on to comment, "Despite Uzi having another 'Bad and Boujee' moment, the track is one of Herbo's greatest triumphs, a collaboration that serves as the heart of the record."

== Live performances ==
On November 16, 2020, G Herbo and Chance the Rapper performed the song on The Tonight Show Starring Jimmy Fallon, as a tribute to Juice Wrld.

== Charts ==
Chart (2020)	Peak position
Canada Hot 100 (Billboard)	69
New Zealand Hot Singles (RMNZ)	22
US Billboard Hot 100	38
US Hot R&B/Hip-Hop Songs (Billboard)	19

== Certifications ==
Region	Certification	Certified units/sales
New Zealand (RMNZ)	Gold	15,000^{‡}
United States (RIAA)	Platinum	1,000,000^{‡}
^{‡} Sales+streaming figures based on certification alone.
