= Pistol P Project =

Mixtape by G Herbo
- Released: December 26, 2014
- Recorded: 2014
- Genre: Drill; gangsta rap; hardcore hip hop
- Length: 30:42
- Label: Machine Entertainment Group
- Producer: Childish Major; DJ L; DJ Fu; DY; Jayze; Slade Da Monsta; Syk Sense; The MeKanics

G Herbo chronology
Welcome to Fazoland (2014)	Pistol P Project (2014)	Ballin Like I'm Kobe (2015)

Pistol P Project is the second mixtape by American rapper G Herbo and was released on December 26, 2014. The mixtape has been downloaded over 575,000 times on Spinrilla and 125,000 times on DatPiff.

== Background ==
Following the critical acclaim of Welcome to Fazoland, his first project of 2014, Lil Herb released Pistol P Project ("PPP") on December 26, 2014, as a surprise mixtape. The mixtape, totaling ten tracks, can be viewed as a prelude to his third mixtape, Ballin Like I'm Kobe, as Herb released it to build further anticipation and satisfy fans' demands. Despite this, the mixtape stands alone, with Stereogum describing it as a "quick dip into one young man’s terrifying, gouged-out personal universe. In the middle of winter, it’s a bracing listen. It stings like a slap, and sometimes that’s what rap needs to do."

The mixtape features production from Childish Major, DJ L, DJ Fu, DY, Jayze, Slade Da Monsta, Syk Sense and The MeKanics. It features guest appearances from Katie Got Bandz, Jace, and Zuse.

== Critical reception ==
Professional ratings
Review scores
Source	Rating
Tiny Mix Tapes	3.5/5 stars

Upon its release, Pistol P Project received generally positive reviews from critics.

Tiny Mix Tapes said that the mixtape displays Herb's "excellence" and noted that "If Welcome to Fazoland was about accomplishing the titular introduction by taking the listener on a brief journey through but one of many South Chicago neighborhoods, Pistol P Project finds Lil Herb in a position of concern for the young people coming of age just down the street, all of whom are being made familiar with the legal and socioeconomic deck stacked against them."

Stereogum commented that on the tape Herb displayed "the scorched-earth nihilistic intensity of his young Chicago peers, but [...] also the technical command and verbal dexterity that a rap classicist can appreciate."

Complex noted the "wide array of sounds shows considerable growth" and that "the tape's eclectic tastes shine throughout."

Consequence of Sound commented that "like its predecessor, Pistol P finds Herb exploring a breadth of personal topics, from growing up in the rough streets of Chicago to the general emotional angst encountered by most 19 year olds."

== Track listing ==
No.	Title	Producer(s)	Length
1.	"Pistol P (Intro)"	DJ L	2:01
2.	"Where I Reside"	DJ L	3:01
3.	"Nothing At All"	DJ Fu	2:43
4.	"Quick and Easy"	The MeKanics; Jayze	3:16
5.	"Jugghouse"	Slade Da Monsta	2:43
6.	"Money" (featuring Katie Got Bandz)	Childish Major	3:23
7.	"Play It Smart" (featuring Jace)	Childish Major	2:17
8.	"Real"	Syk Sense	2:36
9.	"Heaven or Hell (CHIMACA)" (featuring Zuse)	DJ Fu	3:35
10.	"4 Minutes Of Hell Part 4"	DY	4:43
Total length:			30:42
