= Humble Beast =

Studio album by G Herbo
- Released: September 22, 2017
- Recorded: 2015–2017
- Studios: Various: VSOP, Pressure Point and CRC, Chicago; Tree Sounds, Norcross; Circle House, Miami; Means Street, Atlanta; United, Los Angeles
- Genres: Hip hop; drill; trap
- Length: 97:53
- Labels: Machine Entertainment Group; 150 Dream Team; Cinematic; RED
- Producers: Mikkey Halsted (exec.); Joseph "JB" Bowden (also exec.); AnonXmous; Bongo; C-Sick; ChaseTheMoney; Chase Davis; Da Internz; DJ L; DJ Milticket; DJ Ron; Don Cannon; Donis Beats; DP Beats; Jake One; Jungleboy Beats; Kosine; London on da Track; Luca Vialli; Maaly Raw; Mano; MariiBeatz; Pi'erre Bourne; Polo Boy Shawty; Southside; Streetrunner; Tarik Azzouz; Thelonious Martin; TM88; Watson the Great; Young Chop

G Herbo chronology
S4MF2 (2017)	Humble Beast (2017)	Swervo (2018)

Singles from Humble Beast
- 1. "Red Snow" Released: September 9, 2016; 2. "I Like" Released: August 11, 2016; 3. "Everything" Released: March 25, 2017

Humble Beast is the debut album by American rapper G Herbo. It was released on September 22, 2017, by Machine Entertainment Group, 150 Dream Team, Cinematic Music Group and RED Distribution, serving as his first commercial release with Cinematic and RED. The album features production from Da Internz, Southside, C-Sick and DJ Ron, among others. It features guest appearances from American rappers Lil Uzi Vert, Bump J, Lil Bibby, Lil Yachty and Jeremih, among others.

== Background ==
The album was announced in late September 2015. The cover art was later revealed on June 15, 2017. The release date was finally revealed on August 25, 2017. The pre-order was released on September 1, 2017.

== Promotion ==
On September 15, 2017, the EP S4MF2 (abbreviation for Strictly 4 My Fans 2) was released as a prelude to the album.

A deluxe version of the album was announced and originally set to be released on February 9, 2018, however it was delayed. On February 10, 2018, a new release date was unveiled. The revision will include the addition of the tracks "Shook" and "Everything (Remix)" featuring Lil Uzi Vert and Chance the Rapper, which were previously released, along with 8 other songs. It was released on February 16, 2018.

== Singles ==
The lead single, "Red Snow", was released on March 9, 2017. The second single, "I Like", was released on August 11, 2017. The third and final single "Everything" featuring Lil Uzi Vert, was released on August 25, 2017. "4 Minutes of Hell, Pt. 5" was released as a pre-order single on September 1, 2017.

=== Promotional singles ===
On January 23, 2018, "Shook" was released as the lead promotional single. Two days later, its music video was released.

On February 14, 2018, G Herbo teased a remix of "Everything" featuring an additional guest appearance from Chance the Rapper. It was released a day later as the second promotional single.

== Critical reception ==
Professional ratings
Review scores
Source	Rating
HipHopDX	3.6/5
HotNewHipHop	90%
Pitchfork	7.8/10
XXL	4/5

Scott Glaysher of HipHopDX stated that "Chicago's drill rappers haven't had much in the way of a musical shelf life over the past few years. What was once the hottest subgenre now sounds like outdated craze, which is perhaps why Lil Herb went for a strategic rebrand just over a year ago. But it wasn't just his name that matured, his craftwork and lyrical diversity also graduated from the "Lil" league", praising the album's lyricism: "It's clear Herbo still wears his street soldier armor. But more than ever before, he lets his guard down and shows a new level of self-awareness." Patrick Lyons of HotNewHipHop stated that "G Herbo's shown promise throughout his career, and "Humble Beast" feels like a culmination of sorts", praising the album's lyricism: "Herbo is speaking directly to us, sounding as confident and classic as his childhood idols Jay-Z and Nas, telling a story that he's known is important and necessary all along." David Drake of Pitchfork stated that "The Chicago rapper has earned his role as a leader of rap. His latest album recalls the best records of the ’00s graced with a singular kind of songwriting that sounds inarguably like the present", praising the album's lyricism: "Humble Beast feels musically bifurcated between its street and soul segments; a street-soul production synthesis could give his sound some cohesion, and giving his reflective moments a contemporary canvas could only increase their urgency." Preezy of XXL stated that "Humble Beast is an exemplary debut that ranks among the best of the year, exceeds expectations and puts G Herbo in position to claim his stake as the prince of Chi-Town street rap."

== Commercial performance ==
Humble Beast debuted at number 21 on the US Billboard 200 chart, earning 20,000 album-equivalent units (including 14,000 copies as pure album sales) in its first week. The album also debuted at number 14 on the US Top R&B/Hip-Hop Albums chart.

== Track listing ==
Credits adapted from the album's liner notes and BMI.

Humble Beast
No.	Title	Writer(s)	Producer(s)	Length
1.	"Humble Beast (Intro)"	Herbert Wright; Malcolm Martin; Isaac Burns; A'niko Thomas	Thelonious Martin	4:24
2.	"Street"	Wright; Donald Paschall, Jr.; Donald Cannon; Jamaal Henry	DP Beats; Maaly Raw^{[a]}	3:07
3.	"Bi Polar"	Wright; Daniel Watson	Watson the Great; Don Cannon^{[b]}	3:43
4.	"Lil Gangbangin Ass"	Wright; J. Henry	Maaly Raw	2:49
5.	"Everything" (featuring Lil Uzi Vert)	Wright; Symere Woods; Joshua Luellen	Southside; Jake One^{[c]}	2:41
6.	"I Like"	Wright; Ronald Henry, Jr.	DJ Ron	2:58
7.	"Man Now"	Wright; Marcos Palacios; Uforo Ebong; Adam Wright^{[c]}	Kosine; Bongo; MariiBeatz^{[c]}	3:29
8.	"Malcolm"	Wright; Londen Buckner	DJ L	4:51
9.	"Crown Shit" (featuring Bump J& MarVo)	Wright; Terrance Michael Boykin; Buckner	DJ L	4:38
10.	"Mirror" (featuring Lil Bibby)	Wright; Brandon Dickinson, Jr.; Chase Davis; Renee Kirk; Edward Randle	Davis	3:03
11.	"Trials"	Wright; Chase Rose	ChaseTheMoney	3:39
12.	"Red Snow"	Wright; Charles Dumazer	C-Sick	4:11
13.	"No Way Out"	Wright; Emmanuel Nickerson	Mano	3:40
14.	"This n That" (featuring Lil Yachty and Jeremih) (bonus track))	Wright; Miles McCollum; Jeremy Felton; Palacios	Da Internz	3:48
15.	"4 Minutes of Hell, Pt. 5" (bonus track)	Wright; Luca Meloni	Luca Vialli	5:05
Total length:				56:06

Humble Beast — Deluxe version
No.	Title	Writer(s)	Producer(s)	Length
16.	"Sins"	Wright; Nicholas Warwar; Tarik Azzouz	Streetrunner; Azzouz	4:41
17.	"Done for Me"	Wright; London Holmes	London on da Track	3:05
18.	"Never Cared"	Wright	Jungleboy Beats; DJ Milticket	3:32
19.	"4 Nem" (featuring Lil Durk)	Wright; Durk Banks; Adonis Amos-Staton	Donis Beats	3:21
20.	"All Day" (featuring Dave East & Blac Youngsta and Kodak Black)	Wright; Samuel Benson; Tyree Pittman	Young Chop	3:19
21.	"Head Right"	Wright; Paschall, Jr.	DP Beats	2:57
22.	"No Depression"	Wright; Luellen; Bryan Simmons	Southside; TM88	3:12
23.	"Ride"	Wright; Damon Hendricks	Polo Boy Shawty	3:41
24.	"My Way"	Wright; Jonathan Solone-Myvett	AnonXmous	3:00
25.	"How Could U Hate Me"	Wright; Luellen; Jordan Jenks	Southside; Pi'erre Bourne	3:33
26.	"Shook"	Wright; Martin	Thelonious Martin	3:52
27.	"Everything (Remix)" (featuring Lil Uzi Vert and Chance the Rapper)	Wright; Woods; Chancelor Bennett; Luellen	Southside; Jake One^{[c]}	3:34
Total length:				97:53

Notes

- ^{^[a]} signifies a co-producer
- ^{^[b]} signifies an additional producer
- ^{^[c]} signifies an uncredited co-producer or co-writer

Sample credits

- "Mirror" contains an uncredited sample from "Mirror of My Soul", written by Renee Kirk and Edward Randle, as performed by O.V. Wright.

== Personnel ==
Credits adapted from the album's liner notes.

Technical

- Matt Hennessy – recording (tracks 1, 6, 9, 10), mixing (tracks 1, 3–14)
- Salvador Majail – recording (tracks 2, 4, 11)
- Daniel Watson – recording (track 3)
- Kesha Lee – recording (track 5)
- Jim Caruana – recording (tracks 7, 14)
- Brian Cabanatuan – recording (tracks 8, 9, 12, 13, 15)
- Jeff Lane – recording (track 14)
- Thomas "Tillie" Mann – recording (track 14)
- Miguel Scott – mixing (tracks 2, 4), recording (tracks 5, 15)
- James "Groove" Chambers – mixing (tracks 2, 4)
- Dave Kutch – mastering (all tracks)

Additional personnel

- Arturo "Churro" Lopez – album artwork, booklet design and additional photos

== Charts ==
Chart (2017)	Peak position
US Billboard 200	21
US Independent Albums (Billboard)	7
US Top R&B/Hip-Hop Albums (Billboard)	14
