= Strictly 4 My Fans =

Mixtape by G Herbo
- Released: November 24, 2016
- Recorded: 2016
- Genre: Drill; gangsta rap; hardcore hip hop
- Label: Cinematic Music Group; Machine Entertainment; 150 Dream Team; Sony; RED
- Producer: C-Sick; DJ L; DP Beats; Tapez; Chase Davis; Kid Deezy; Kid Marquis; Charlie Handsome; Southside

G Herbo chronology
Ballin Like I'm Kobe (2015)	Strictly 4 My Fans (2016)	Welcome to Fazoland 1.5 (2017)

Singles from Strictly 4 My Fans
- 1. "Pull Up" Released: August 21, 2016; 2. "Strictly 4 My Fans (Intro)" Released: November 17, 2016

Strictly 4 My Fans is the fourth mixtape by American rapper G Herbo. It was released on November 24, 2016. Unlike his other mixtapes that were made for free download, this one was up for purchase.

== Content ==
The mixtape features production from C-Sick, DJ L, Southside, DP Beats, Tapez, Chase Davis, Kid Deezy, Kid Marquis, and Charlie Handsome. It includes a guest feature by Lil Bibby. The cover art was created by Canadian artist Pencil Fingerz.

== Track listing ==
No.	Title	Writer(s)	Producer(s)	Length
1.	"Strictly 4 My Fans (Intro)"	Herbert Wright; Charles Dumazer; London Buckner	C-Sick; DJ L	3:18
2.	"Gutta"	Wright	Tapez	4:30
3.	"Crazy"	Wright	Chase Davis	3:08
4.	"Run It Up"	Wright	TheKidDeezy	3:34
5.	"Pull Up"	Wright	Kid Marquis	3:29
6.	"Control"	Wright; Ryan Vojtesak	Charlie Handsome	4:10
7.	"Tired" (featuring Lil Bibby)	Wright; Brandon Dickinson; Buckner	DJ L	3:38
8.	"Havin Shit"	Wright; Dumazer	C-Sick	3:33
9.	"Something"	Wright; Don Paschall	DP Beats	3:02
10.	"Eastside Story"	Wright; Joshua Luellen	Southside	2:26
11.	"Jay-Z (Outro)"	Wright; Buckner; Dumazer	DJ L; C-Sick	3:45

== Reception ==
The mixtape received mostly positive reviews from Pitchfork and HipHopDX.
