= PTSD (G Herbo album) =

Studio album by G Herbo
- Released: February 28, 2020
- Genre: Hip hop; drill
- Length: 94:00
- Label: Machine; Epic
- Producer: Chase Davis; C-Sick; D.A Got That Dope; DJ Ayo; DJ L; DJ Victoriouz; DLo; Don Cannon; Dougie on the Beat; DY; TM88; JoFromTheYo

G Herbo chronology
Still Swervin (2019)	PTSD (2020)	25 (2021)

Singles from PTSD
- 1. "In This Bitch" Released: February 14, 2020; 2. "Shooter" Released: February 21, 2020

PTSD is the third studio album by American rapper G Herbo. It was released on February 28, 2020, by Machine Entertainment Group and Epic Records, and was originally marketed and distributed by The Orchard (subsidiary of Sony Music). The production on the album was handled by multiple producers including C-Sick, D.A Damon, Don Cannon, TM88 and DJ Victoriouz, among others. It features guest appearances from fellow rappers 2Pretty, 21 Savage, A Boogie wit da Hoodie, BJ the Chicago Kid, Chance the Rapper, Jacquees, Juice Wrld, Lil Durk, Lil Uzi Vert, Polo G and Sonta.

PTSD was preceded by two singles: "In This Bitch" and "Shooter". The album received positive reviews from music critics and debuted at number seven on the US Billboard 200, earning 59,000 album-equivalent units in its first week. It was certified gold by Recording Industry Association of America (RIAA) in March 2021. The deluxe edition of the album was released on May 29, 2020.

== Background ==
G Herbo said the album was inspired by therapy he took related to his upbringing and misdeeds. He said that he was pushed to go to therapy after being arrested in 2018. He said "When the lawyer told me to go see the therapist, it was really just me embracing it." He said he also wanted the album to raise awareness on the mental issues many people raised in high-crime neighborhoods go through, saying, "I thought it was important for me because I know it's a lot of people who are like me."

== Singles ==
The album was supported by two singles. The first single, "In This Bitch" was released on February 14, 2020. The music video was released online on March 9, 2020. The second single, "Shooter" was released on February 21, 2020, only a few days before the album's release. The single also features a guest appearance by Jacquees.

=== Other songs ===
The title track, "PTSD", featuring Juice Wrld, Chance the Rapper, and Lil Uzi Vert became G Herbo's first ever song to chart on the US Billboard Hot 100, peaking at number 38 on the chart, as well as number 19 on US Hot R&B/Hip-Hop Songs, and number 15 on US Hot Rap Songs. On May 7, 2020, the song was certified gold by the Recording Industry Association of America (RIAA). The track "Glass In the Face", featuring A Boogie Wit da Hoodie additionally became his first ever song on the Bubbling Under Hot 100 chart, peaking at number 17.

== Touring ==
On December 4, 2019, G Herbo announced the PTSD Tour, which would occur from February 10 to March 22, 2020. He later postponed a show in Denver, Colorado due to fears over the COVID-19 pandemic.

== Critical reception ==
Professional ratings
Review scores
Source	Rating
AllMusic	3.5/5 stars
HipHopDX	4/5
Pitchfork	7.3/10

Fred Thomas of AllMusic stated that "Chicago's G Herbo evolved from solid mixtapes to being a superstar of the rap subgenre drill. Herbo's intense lyrics of personal trauma and struggles fit perfectly within drill's foreboding instrumental framework, and his fourth studio album, PTSD, finds the rapper moving into his most polished material without losing any energy." In addition, Thomas also praised the title track, stating that: "The album's title track is its catchiest moment and also one of its darkest. Lil Uzi Vert, Chance the Rapper, and Juice Wrld, Herbo delivers lyrics of mental health issues, paranoia, and anger in the form of a mesmerizing melodic hook." Alphonse Pierre of Pitchfork rated the album 7.3/10, saying "PTSD stays true to Herb's core: first-hand tales of living with trauma and paranoia and failing to overcome that trauma and paranoia with drugs and success."

== Commercial performance ==
PTSD debuted at number seven on the US Billboard 200, earning 59,000 album-equivalent units, (including 4,000 copies as pure album sales) in its first week. This became G Herbo's first US top ten debut on the chart. The album also debuted at four on the US Top R&B/Hip-Hop Albums and number three on the US Top Rap Albums charts, respectively. On March 25, 2021, the album was certified gold by Recording Industry Association of America (RIAA) for combined sales and album-equivalent units of over 500,000 units in the United States.

== Track listing ==
Credits adapted from Tidal and BMI.

PTSD track listing
No.	Title	Writer(s)	Producer(s)	Length
1.	"Intro"	Herbert Wright III; Donald Cannon; Larrance Dopson	Don Cannon; Dopson	3:08
2.	"Glass in the Face" (featuring A Boogie Wit Da Hoodie)	Wright; Artist Dubose; Damile Costa; Joseph Zoumboulias	DLo; JoFromTheYo	3:05
3.	"Gangstas Cry" (featuring BJ The Chicago Kid)	Wright; Bryan Sledge; Julian Davis	Chase Davis	3:37
4.	"In This Bitch"	Wright; DeAndre Woods	DJ Victoriouz	3:07
5.	"Death Row"	Wright; Bryan Simmons	TM88; DY^{[a]}; Cubeatz^{[a]}	3:04
6.	"Party in Heaven" (featuring Lil Durk)	Wright; Durk Banks; Cannon	Don Cannon; Sean Momberger; Lyle LeDuff	3:16
7.	"PTSD" (featuring Juice Wrld, Lil Uzi Vert, and Chance the Rapper)	Wright; Jarad Higgins; Symere Woods; Chancellor Bennett; David Doman; Christopher Torpey; James Lavigne; Mikkey Nance	D.A Got That Dope	3:52
8.	"By Any Means" (featuring 21 Savage)	Wright; Shayaa Abraham-Joseph; D. Woods	DJ Victoriouz	3:39
9.	"Gangbangin"	Wright; Londen Buckner; D. Woods	DJ L; DJ Victoriouz	2:34
10.	"Lawyer Fees" (featuring Polo G)	Wright; Taurus Bartlett; Jahmere Tylon	DJ Ayo	4:07
11.	"Feelings"	Wright; Douglas Whitehead; Jason Phillips; Alan Maman	Dougie On The Beat	3:36
12.	"High Speed"	Wright; D. Woods	DJ Victoriouz; Trademark^{[a]}; Jodi^{[a]}	2:44
13.	"Shooter" (featuring Jacquees)	Wright; Rodriquez Broadnax; Doman; Donald McCann, Jr.; Yaroslav Blyudoy; Nance	D.A Got That Dope	3:20
14.	"Intuition" (featuring 2Pretty and Sonta)	Wright; Sonta Me'Shay; Breana Adams; Mashayla Reinhardt; Charles Dumazer; Dwight Grant; D. Meyers; Dave Lewis	C-Sick	4:06
Total length:				47:15

Deluxe edition
No.	Title	Writer(s)	Producer(s)	Length
1.	"Friends & Foes"	Wright; Xavier Dotson	Zaytoven	3:37
2.	"Cap Guns"	Wright; Daniel Ivy	Oz on the Track; Cal-i^{[a]}	3:17
3.	"Spam 2 Lamb"	Wright; Dotson	Zaytoven	3:38
4.	"Real One" (featuring Lil Durk)	Wright; Banks; Dwan Avery	DY; Tarentino^{[a]}; Bobby Raps^{[a]}	2:42
5.	"In a Minute"	Wright; Cannon	Don Cannon; Momberger^{[a]}	3:52
6.	"Smoke"	Wright; D. Woods; Anthony Beecham	DJ Victoriouz; KidWond3r	2:35
7.	"Like This" (featuring Lil Uzi Vert)	Wright; S. Woods; Davis; D. Woods	Davis; DJ Victoriouz	3:35
8.	"OFNG"	Wright; Ivy	Oz on the Track; Cal-i^{[a]}	3:47
9.	"High School"	Wright; Dotson	Zaytoven	3:15
10.	"Ridin Wit It"	Wright; Davis	Chase Davis	3:18
11.	"Trenches"	Wright; Cannon	Don Cannon; Momberger^{[a]}	2:02
12.	"Lil Ride"	Wright; Davis	Davis	4:12
13.	"Just a Nigga"	Wright; Davis	Davis	3:02
14.	"4am to 8am"	Wright; Buckner; Nance	DJ L	3:46
Total length:				94:00

Notes

- ^{^[a]} signifies an uncredited co-producer

== Charts ==
=== Weekly charts ===
Chart performance for PTSD
Chart (2020)	Peak position
Canadian Albums (Billboard)	32
US Billboard 200	7
US Top R&B/Hip-Hop Albums (Billboard)	4
US Top Rap Albums (Billboard)	3

=== Year-end charts ===
2020 year-end chart performance for PTSD
Chart (2020)	Position
US Billboard 200	126
US Top R&B/Hip-Hop Albums (Billboard)	67

== Certifications ==
Region	Certification	Certified units/sales
United States (RIAA)	Gold	500,000^{‡}
^{‡} Sales+streaming figures based on certification alone.
