= DCG Brothers =

American hip hop duo

- Origin: Chicago
- Genres: Hip Hop
- Label: Atlantic
- Members: DCG Shun, DCG BSavv

The DCG Brothers are an American hip hop duo based in Chicago, Illinois, USA. The group is made up of two brothers, known by their stage names DCG Shun and DCG BSavv. The initials "DCG" in their name is said to stand for "Dreams Conquer Goals".

== Career ==
In early 2021, the DCG Brothers released singles such as " Mmhmm" featuring instrumental production by Chicago producer Spvnkonnabeat, as well as their collaboration "Rivals" with fellow Chicago artist Calboy.

In June 2021, the duo signed a record deal with Atlantic Records and Chicago media company No More Heroes followed by the release of their debut single "House Party" on the Lyrical Lemonade YouTube channel. Later in the year the duo went on to perform their single "Mmhmm" at Lollapalooza alongside fellow Chicago artist G Herbo.

Throughout 2022, the duo performed on tour alongside fellow Chicago artist and frequent collaborator G Herbo. Later in the year they released their debut mixtape Jungle Life, which included features from several artists such as G Herbo, BIG 30 and B-Lovee. Near the end of December, the duo released their single "Bond Hold" featuring video production by No More Heroes.
