= Doe Boy (rapper) =

American rapper (born 1994)

- Born: Cotrell J. Dennard; March 25, 1994 (age 32); Cleveland, Ohio, U.S.
- Occupations: Rapper; songwriter
- Years active: 2012–present
- Labels: Epic; Freebandz; RBMG
- Website: www.ohrealllyyy.com

Isam Mostafa (born Cotrell J. Dennard; March 25, 1994), better known by his stage name Doe Boy, is an American rapper. He is best known for his 2019 single "100 Shooters" (with Future featuring Meek Mill), which peaked atop the Bubbling Under Hot 100 chart.

== Early life ==
Isam Mostafa was born Cotrell J. Dennard on March 25, 1994, in Cleveland, Ohio.

== Career ==
Doe Boy gained popularity after he released the track "Mini Vans" in October 2018. However, he wouldn't receive wide exposure until he released his single "Walk Down" in April 2019, which went viral after a video surfaced of NBA star LeBron James rapping to the song. This helped Doe Boy earn a remix of the track with YG.

In July 2019, Doe Boy released the single "100 Shooters" with Future, which had a feature from Meek Mill. Doe Boy was also featured on Young Thug's August 2019 track "I'm Scared" with 21 Savage.

In May 2020, Doe Boy released the single "Split It" with Moneybagg Yo.

In September 2022, Doe Boy was featured on Roddy Ricch's single "Ghetto Superstar" alongside G Herbo.

Doe Boy released Beezy, a 16 track album, in 2023. The project included a host of features and peaked at number four on the U.S. Heatseekers Charts.

He released "Come Here", a diss track against YoungBoy Never Broke Again, in July 2026.

== Discography ==
=== Mixtapes ===
Title	Album details	Peak chart positions
Title	Album details	US Heat.
Since 1994	Released: October 31, 2010; Host: DJ Durel; Label: Self-released; Format: Digital Download	—
Boyz N Da Hood (with Lex Luger)	Released: August 8, 2011; Host: Trap-A-Holics; Label: Self-released; Format: Digital download	—
Since 1994, Pt. 2	Released: February 14, 2012; Host: DJ 5150; Label: RBMG; Format: Digital Download	—
Boyz N Da Hood 2 (with Lex Luger and Young Chop)	Released: November 5, 2012; Host: Trap-A-Holics; Label: RBMG; Format: Digital download, streaming	—
In Freebandz We Trust	Released: June 24, 2013; Host: DJ Scream, DJ Esco, DJ X-Rated; Label: RBMG, Freebandz; Format: Digital download, streaming	—
Free Doe Boy	Released: August 28, 2014; Host: Trap-A-Holics, Future; Label: RBMG, Freebandz; Format: Digital Download	—
Streetz Need Me	Released: December 12, 2016; Label: RBMG, Freebandz; Format: Digital download, streaming	—
Codeine Confessions	Released: April 14, 2017; Label: RBMG, Freebandz; Format: Digital download, streaming	—
In Freebandz We Trust 2	Released: October 9, 2017; Label: RBMG, Freebandz; Format: Digital download, streaming	—
No Worries	Released: January 24, 2018; Label: RBMG, Freebandz; Format: Digital download, streaming	—
88 Birdz (with TM88)	Released: August 22, 2018; Executive Producer: Young Thug; Label: RBMG, Freebandz; Format: Digital download, streaming	—
The Bandprint	Released: October 15, 2018; Label: RBMG, Freebandz; Format: Digital download, streaming	—
Streetz Need Me 2	Released: December 20, 2019; Label: Epic, RBMG, Freebandz; Format: Digital download, streaming	—
56 Birdz (with DJ Esco)	Released: March 13, 2020; Label: Epic, RBMG, Freebandz; Format: Digital download, streaming	—
Demons R Us (with Southside)	Released: November 6, 2020; Label: Epic, RBMG, Freebandz; Format: Digital download, streaming	—
Oh Really	Released: January 26, 2022; Label: Epic, RBMG, Freebandz; Format: Digital download, streaming	1
Catch Me If You Can	Released: July 29, 2022; Label: Epic, RBMG, Freebandz; Format: Digital download, streaming	—
Beezy	Released: June 9, 2023; Label: Epic, RBMG, Freebandz; Format: Digital download, streaming	4
Last Hope	Released: October 8, 2025; Label: RBMG; Format: Digital download, streaming	

=== Extended plays ===
Title	EP details
4 Piece	Released: August 28, 2019; Label: CMG, Freebandz; Format: Digital download, streaming

=== Singles ===
==== As lead artist ====
Title	Year	Peak chart positions			Album
Title	Year	US Bub.	US R&B/HH	US Rhy.	Album
"Back in My Bag" (featuring Future)	2018	—	—	—	88 Birdz
"Slimey As It Get" (featuring Young Thug)	2018	—	—	—	88 Birdz
"Mini Vans"	2018	—	—	—	The Bandprint
"2X"	2018	—	—	—	The Bandprint
"Walk Down" (solo or featuring YG)	2019	—	—	—	Streetz Need Me 2
"Cash App" (featuring Key Glock)	2019	—	—	—	Non-album single
"100 Shooters" (with Future featuring Meek Mill)	2019	1	39	—	High Off Life
"Primetime" (with DJ Esco)	2020	—	—	—	56 Birdz
"Split It" (with Moneybagg Yo)	2020	—	—	—	Non-album single
"Low Key" (featuring Lil Uzi Vert)	2021	—	—	—	Oh Really
"Way Too Long"	2023	—	—	29	Non-album single

==== As featured artist ====
Title	Year	Album
"Nothin To Me" (Hardo, Peewee Longway, and Tay Keith featuring Doe Boy)	2020	Days Inn
"Ghetto Superstar" (Roddy Ricch, G Herbo featuring Doe Boy)	2022	Non-album single

=== Other charted songs ===
Title	Year	Peak chart positions		Album
Title	Year	US Bub.	US R&B/HH Bub.	Album
"I'm Scared" (Young Thug featuring 21 Savage and Doe Boy)	2019	21	5	So Much Fun
