= Welcome to Fazoland =

Mixtape by G Herbo
- Released: February 17, 2014
- Recorded: 2013–14
- Genres: Drill; gangsta rap; hardcore hip hop
- Length: 1:03:09
- Label: Machine Entertainment Group
- Producers: DJ L; J Block Music; Brian "All Day" Miller; Luca Vialli; D. Brooks; C-Sick; Da Internz; Block On Da Track; Nascent; Showtyme; Da Surgeonz; DJ Kenn (All Or Nothing/A.O.N); Snapback; Honorable C Note; Lewi V; Echo

G Herbo chronology
Welcome to Fazoland (2014)	Pistol P Project (2014)

Welcome to Fazoland is the Debut mixtape by American rapper G Herbo and was released on February 17, 2014. The mixtape has been downloaded over 375,000 times on DatPiff.

== Background ==
Welcome to Fazoland is dedicated to Herb's fallen friend, Fasion “Fazon” Robinson. On a Vlad TV interview Herb says “I got the name of the tape from my homie,” “He passed away. His name is Fazon. We called him Fazo. We named our hood after Fazoland. ‘Welcome To Fazoland,’ I’ma give em where I came from, tell em what's going on out here. It's a really a story, I'm tryna tell a story. Who I am and where I'm from and how I got to where I am right now.”

The mixtape features production from DJ L, J Block Music, Brian "All Day" Miller, Luca Vialli, D. Brooks, C-Stick, Da Internz, Block On Da Track, Nascent, Showtyme, Da Surgeonz, DJ Kenn, Snapback, Honorable C Note, Lewi V and Echo. It features guest appearances from Lil Durk, Lil Reese, KD, Young Cocky and Lil Bibby.

== Critical reception ==
Professional ratings
Review scores
Source	Rating
HotNewHipHop	8/10 stars
Tiny Mix Tapes	4.5/5 stars
XXL	3/5 stars
BET	4/5 stars

Upon its release, Welcome to Fazoland received generally positive reviews from critics.

The Fader commented that, "since drill rose to prominence a few years ago, lyrical bankruptcy has remained one of its most common critiques; Herb’s way with words defies the stereotype."

Mike De Leon of HotNewHipHop rated the mixtape an 85% saying "There's one thing Chicago rappers know how to do, and that's tell the reality of the streets of Chiraq. Lil Herb's talent is unquestionable. Definitely worth a listen, the intro should be enough for you to ask for more. Production could be better."

Trevor Smith of HotNewHipHop gave the mixtape an 82% saying "Herb is a thrilling rapper, and while he can get by on showiness alone, 'Fazoland' finds him letting us in on his story amidst the furious flows. Don't look at him as the Anti-Keef, but rather an exciting new voice in an increasingly diverse scene."

Rose Lilah of HotNewHipHop gave the mixtape a 78%, saying "Lil Herb's debut lives up to its title, as he details stories from the streets of Fazoland, backed by soulful, grimy & somewhat drill-inspired beats. It has peaked my interest, as Herb refreshes the drill sound and finds his own style."

XXL gave the mixtape an L (3/5), saying "Herb does a solid job of taking (...) drill music and adding his own twist to it through his variation of soul-inspired production on the tape and lyrical approach," while also praising the mixtape's "vivid imagery and creativity" and calling it "a vicious curveball."

BET awarded the mixtape four out of five stars, lauding the mixtape's use of "heavy bass, rapid fire snare and the occasional synth to accompany [Herb's] stories of paranoia, drug dealing and constant danger that tend to consume his psyche," while also commenting that Lil Herb, like other Drill artists, has helped "to do for his city what N.W.A did for Compton in the '80s: bringing awareness to what life is like in a city that has spent recent years as one of America's most dangerous places to live."

Complex praised Herb's "dexterous" rapping style as well as the mixtape's "titanic drill beats" and "contemporary vitality." The Chicago Reader described Lil Herb as "a fierce, gifted rapper who captures all the intensity, hostility, and emotion of a particular moment in just a few lines, and [who] can do it with such speed that by the time you've unpacked what Herb's said, he's already moved onto the next few grim portraits of his environment."

== Track listing ==
No.	Title	Producer(s)	Length
1.	"Herbo (Intro)"		1:04
2.	"At the Light"	DJ L	3:01
3.	"Koolin"	J Block Music	3:26
4.	"Fight or Flight"	Brian "All Day" Miller	2:59
5.	"4 Minutes of Hell, Pt. 3"	Luca Vialli	4:35
6.	"On the Corner" (featuring Lil Durk, KD Young Cocky)	D. Brooks	4:44
7.	"Momma, I'm Sorry"	C-Sick	2:46
8.	"On My Soul" (featuring Lil Reese)	Da Internz	4:38
9.	"Designer"	DJ L	3:29
10.	"Another Day/Murder" (featuring King Louie)	Block on Da Track	3:39
11.	"Still Fucked Up"	Nascent	2:45
12.	"Love 2 Stunt"	Showtyme	4:03
13.	"All My Niggas"	Da Surgeonz	4:23
14.	"Ain't For None"	DJ Kenn A.O.N	3:12
15.	"Write Your Name"	Snapback	3:19
16.	"All I Got" (featuring Lil Bibby)	Honorable C.N.O.T.E.	4:25
17.	"Everyday in Chicago (Bonus track)"	Lewi V	2:47
18.	"At Night (Bonus track)" (featuring Lil Bibby)	Echo	4:01
19.	"Kill Shit (Bonus track)" (featuring Lil Bibby)	Randy Savage	2:50
Total length:			1:03:09

Sample credits

- "Koolin'" samples "Revival" performed by Neil Davidge.
- "Fight or Flight" samples "Broken Wing" performed by Googie & Tom Coppola.
- "4 Minutes of Hell, Pt. 3" samples "The Host of Seraphim" performed by Dead Can Dance.
- "Momma, I'm Sorry" samples "Ballad" performed by Vangelis.
- "Still Fucked Up" samples "This Loves For Real" performed by The Impressions.
- "Write Your Name" samples "Betcha by Golly, Wow" performed by The Stylistics.
- "Everyday in Chicago" samples "Swimming Pools (Drank)" performed by Kendrick Lamar.
