= G Herbo =

American rapper (born 1995)

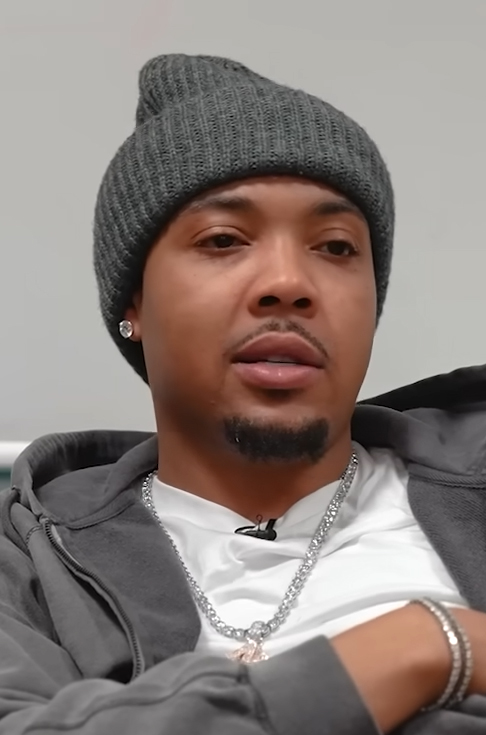
- G Herbo in 2025

Background information
- Also known as: Lil Herb; Swervo
- Born: Herbert Randall Wright III; October 8, 1995 (age 31); Chicago, Illinois, U.S.
- Genres: Midwestern hip-hop; drill; trap
- Occupations: Rapper; songwriter
- Works: Discography
- Years active: 2011–present
- Labels: Republic; Epic; RED; 808 Mafia; Cinematic; 150 Dream Team; Machine; N.L.M.B.
- Producer(s): Southside
- Children: 2
- Website: gherbo.com

Logo
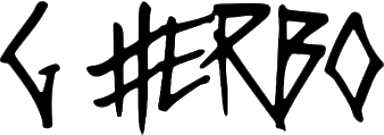

Herbert Randall Wright III (born October 8, 1995), better known by his stage name G Herbo (formerly Lil Herb), is an American rapper. He signed with the Chicago-based record label Machine Entertainment Group in 2011, at the age of 16. His debut mixtape, Welcome to Fazoland (2014), was released by the label, along with its follow-ups Pistol P Project (2014), Ballin Like I'm Kobe (2015), and Strictly 4 My Fans (2016). His debut studio album, Humble Beast (2017), was released by Cinematic Music Group and met with critical acclaim.

He signed onto a triple-joint venture with Epic Records to release his collaborative album and major label debut, Swervo (2018) with record producer Southside; its sequel, Still Swervin (2019), served as Wright's second album. His third album, PTSD (2020), peaked within the top ten of the Billboard 200, and he signed with Republic Records to release his subsequent albums: 25 (2021), Survivor's Remorse (2022), Big Swerv (2024), and Lil Herb (2025).

== Early life ==
Wright grew up in Chicago, Illinois. He dropped out of school when he was 16, having attended Hyde Park Academy High School. He was influenced by Meek Mill, Jeezy, Gucci Mane, Yo Gotti and Lil Wayne. He is close friends with fellow rapper Lil Bibby, with whom he has collaborated on numerous songs early in their respective careers. Both artists are associated with the group N.L.M.B., which was originally formed from the merger of No Limit, a renegade faction of the Almighty Black P. Stone Nation, and the Muskegon Boyz, a renegade faction of the Gangster Disciples, although the initials N.L.M.B. are also currently used by the gang to signify "Never Leave My Brothers," and "No Limit Muskegon Boys." Wright has stated that N.L.M.B. is a "brotherhood" rather than a gang.

== Career ==
=== 2012–2014: Career beginnings and Welcome to Fazoland ===
G Herbo and Lil Bibby first gained attention with the song "Kill Shit", which has since been viewed over 50 million times on YouTube. Lil Herb and Lil Bibby gained broader attention within the hip-hop community when Canadian rapper Drake called them "the future".

Herbo's first mixtape, Welcome to Fazoland, was released on February 17, 2014. The mixtape is named in honor of Fazon Robinson, one of the first of Herbo's friends to be killed by gun violence in Chicago. Welcome to Fazoland was met with broad critical acclaim, with Fader commenting that, "since drill rose to prominence a few years ago, lyrical bankruptcy has remained one of its most common critiques; Herb's way with words defies the stereotype."

In April 2014, Herbo collaborated with East Coast rapper Nicki Minaj on "Chiraq". He contributed to fellow Chicago rapper Common's album Nobody's Smiling, guest appearing on its track "The Neighborhood." Herb was selected for XXL's Show & Prove segment of the 2014 Freshman Class issue. Herbo also recorded "Fight or Flight (Remix)" with Chance the Rapper and Common.

=== 2014–2016: Pistol P Project and Ballin Like I'm Kobe ===
On December 26, 2014, Herbo released the surprise mixtape Pistol P Project, his second project of 2014. On April 2, 2015, Herbo guest featured on Chief Keef's "Faneto (Remix)" with fellow Chicago rappers King Louie, Lil Bibby, and Lil Durk.

On June 9, 2015, after being omitted from the 2015 XXL Freshman Cover, Herbo released a single titled "XXL". In response, XXL gave compliments to the rapper, saying he "switches between different flows effortlessly". On June 13, 2016, XXL announced the 2016 Freshman Class, which includes Herbo.

On August 4, 2015, Herbo announced his third mixtape, Ballin Like I'm Kobe, named in honor of his fallen friend Jacobi D. Herring. On September 3, 2015, it was announced that Wright had signed with Cinematic Music Group and had officially changed his rap moniker to G Herbo. On September 27, 2015, Herb announced that Ballin Like I'm Kobe would be released on September 29, 2015. On September 29, 2015, the mixtape was released to widespread critical acclaim.

On November 11, 2015, Herbo released a collaborative single, titled "Lord Knows", with New York rapper Joey Badass.

=== 2016–2018: Humble Beast and Strictly 4 My Fans / Welcome to Fazoland 1.5 ===
In an interview at SXSW on April 4, 2016, Herbo announced his debut albums' title, Humble Beast, stating that "You can definitely expect an album in 2016." In mid 2016, he released two singles, "Pull Up" and "Drop". Herbo also dropped the single "Yeah I Know" in March 2016. Herbo also released a fourth single "Ain't Nothing to Me", with a music video being released on October 10, 2016. Herbo was featured on DJ Twin's song "They Know Us" with Sean Kingston and Lil Bibby. On November 17, 2016, Herb released the album art, release date, and track list for his fourth mixtape, Strictly 4 My Fans. On the same day, he released the second single from the mixtape, "Strictly 4 My Fans (Intro)". It was also revealed that Herbo and Lil Bibby have a collaborative project, No Limitation, in the works. On March 17, 2017, Herbo released Welcome To Fazoland 1.5, containing unreleased songs from Welcome To Fazoland. The single "Yea I Know", was released in March 2016. Three singles were released for Humble Beast. The lead single, "Red Snow", was released on March 9, 2017. The second single, "I Like", was released on August 11, 2017. The third and final single "Everything", was released on August 25, 2017. "4 Minutes of Hell, Pt. 5" was released as a pre-order single on September 1, 2017. Later that month, on September 22, 2017, Humble Beast was released. Herbo later drops a deluxe edition of the album Humble Beast with more songs in 2018.

=== 2018–present: Swervo, Still Swervin, PTSD, and 25 ===
On March 16, 2018, Herbo went on radio station K104 in Dallas, Texas, and did a freestyle to the beat used in the song "Who Run It". Six days later, the full remix was released on all music platforms. The freestyle caught so much attention, later the rapper Lil Uzi Vert eventually featured on his own remix to "Who Run It". Before this collaboration happened, Herbo released the single "Shook". This song appeared on the deluxe edition to his album Humble Beast, which was released in 2018. Throughout the year, he released a couple of other singles titled "Focused" and "Swervo". On July 27, 2018, Herbo released the album Swervo, which included features from rappers 21 Savage, Chief Keef, Young Thug, and Juice Wrld. This album included the singles "Swervo", "Focused", and "Who Run It", but not the remix featuring Lil Uzi Vert. This album was entirely produced by Southside. They had worked together before but never on a full album. On December 14, 2018, Vic Mensa released his album titled HOOLIGANS. Herbo was featured on the song "Rowdy". In early 2019, the single "Up It" was released, this appeared on his second album entirely produced by Southside titled Still Swervin, which was released on February 1, 2019.

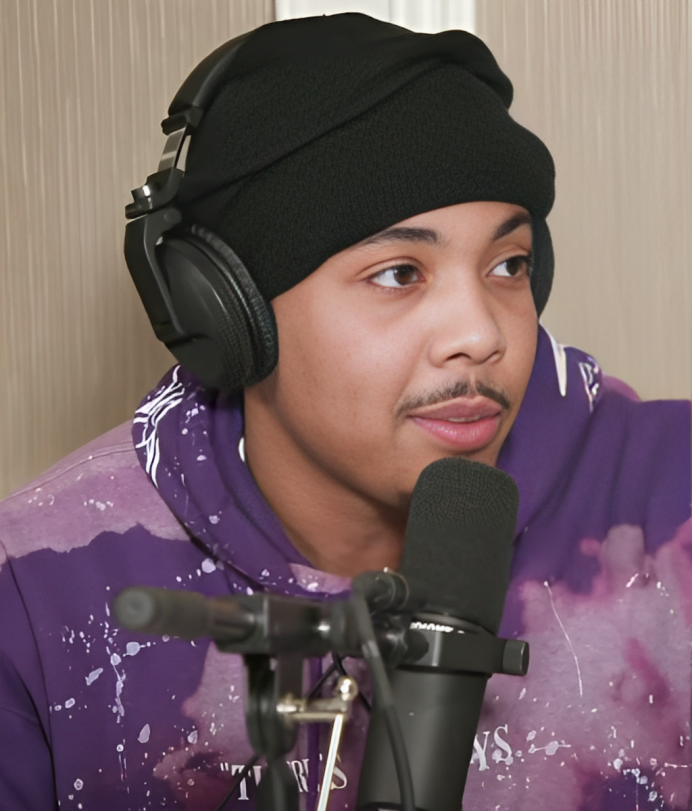
G Herbo in 2021

On February 28, 2020, G Herbo released the album PTSD with 14 tracks and featuring A Boogie wit da Hoodie, BJ the Chicago Kid, Lil Durk, Chance the Rapper, Juice Wrld, Lil Uzi Vert, 21 Savage, Polo G, and multiple other artists. The album debuted at number 7 on the Billboard 200. On March 6, 2020, G Herbo featured on friend and Chicago drill rapper King Von song named "On Yo Ass", for his mixtape Levon James. A music video was also released on the same day.

On May 14, 2020, G Herbo appears and is featured with King Von on Mozzy's song "Body Count", he participates on the song with a verse and he appears on the official music video, published on the same date. On December 18, 2020, G Herbo returned with a new song and video, "Statement". In it, he addresses and denies fraud charges brought against him and multiple other alleged associates earlier in the month. In a February 2021 interview, Lil Bibby said that G Herbo had contacted him with regards to completing work on their upcoming collaborative effort, No Limitations. Bibby stated that he is ready to finish the project in 2021. On March 4, 2022, G Herbo is featured on another King Von song named "Facetime" for What It Means to Be King posthumous studio album.

On March 5, Herbo returned with two new singles, "Break Yoself" and "Really Like That". Both songs sees Herbo "operating in a stripped-back mode, with eerie beats and a non-stop delivery". The songs are included on Herbo's fourth studio album, 25, which was released on July 2, 2021. The album has an additional 16 tracks.

On July 14, 2023, G Herbo has a guest appearance on King Von second posthumous album or in other words, his third studio album, Grandson for the track "Real Oppy" with a verse. Later on October 20, 2023, he was co-featured alongside Nardo Wick on MudBaby Ru's single "Gun Class ll", which also has a music video.

== Personal life ==
Wright has a son, born in 2018, from his relationship with Ariana Fletcher. As of December 2020, he is engaged to Taina Williams, stepdaughter of rapper Fabolous; she gave birth to their first child, a boy, on May 27, 2021.

== Legal issues ==
In February 2018, Wright and two other men were arrested after their limousine driver informed police that some of his passengers had weapons. Wright was observed in the rear driver-side passenger seat placing a Fabrique National handgun in the seat rear pocket. Neither Wright nor the other two men had Illinois firearm owner's identification cards, and all three were charged with aggravated unlawful use of a weapon, a felony under the Illinois Compiled Statutes.

Wright was arrested in Atlanta on April 19, 2019, for simple battery after an alleged physical altercation with the mother of his child, Ariana "Ari" Fletcher. Fletcher shared her story on Instagram on Thursday, April 18, stating, "He kicked my door down to get in my house because I wouldn't let him in, beat the fuck out of me in front of my son. Then he took my son outside to his friends and had them drive off with my son, hid all my knifes in my house, broke my phone and locked me inside and beat the fuck out of me again…" She stated there were physical signs of abuse as well, such as a black eye, and scrapes, cuts and bruises all over her body. Wright was released one week later on $2,000 bail. Upon his release, he took to Instagram Live to discuss the altercation with Fletcher. In the video session, Herbo stated that Fletcher had stolen jewelry from his mother's house. Specifically he stated, "I've been quiet all this time. I ain't do no insurance claim or try to get you locked up. Nothing. You told me to come to Atlanta to get the jewelry back."

On December 2, 2020, Wright and several associates, Antonio "T-Glo" Strong, Wright's promoter and manager; South Side rapper Joseph "Joe Rodeo" Williams; and alleged co-conspirators Steven Hayes Jr., Demario Sorrells and Terrence Bender, all from Chicago, were indicted on 14 federal charges that included wire fraud, and aggravated identity theft, in a federal court in Massachusetts. It was alleged that Wright and his associates bought expensive trips and designer puppies, and rented luxury villas in Jamaica and private jets, all with stolen identification. It is alleged that the fraud amounted to millions of dollars over a four-year period dating back to 2016.

Wright pleaded guilty to conspiring to commit wire fraud and making false statements at a federal court in Springfield, Massachusetts on July 28, 2023, while agreeing to pay a fine of $140,000. In exchange, the prosecutors dropped several counts of aggravated identity theft.

== Charity work ==
In 2018, Wright contributed to the redevelopment of a former elementary school in Chicago, Anthony Overton Elementary School. In this building, Wright's goal was to include equipment that could potentially help young people who want to become musicians. He also aimed to include free programs and sports to keep young people busy so they are not involved in street life. In July 2020, Wright launched Swervin' Through Stress, an initiative that provides Black youths with therapeutic resources to improve their mental health over a 12-week course. The project was inspired by his own experiences and the truama others faced within his community, as well as his complex post-traumatic stress disorder which stemmed from his own earlier therapy sessions. He elaborated, "I don't want to be that guy to have all the resources to change my neighborhood, change my city and the youth and do nothing with it. That's why it's so important to me to be honest".

== Discography ==
Studio albums

- Humble Beast (2017)
- Still Swervin (2019)
- PTSD (2020)
- 25 (2021)
- Survivor's Remorse (2022)
- Big Swerv (2024)
- Lil Herb (2025)

Collaborative albums

- Swervo (with Southside) (2018)

== Filmography ==
=== Film ===
Year	Title	Role	Notes
2021	Juice Wrld: Into the Abyss	Himself	Documentary
