= 808 Mafia =

American record production and songwriting team

- Origin: Atlanta, Georgia, U.S.
- Genres: Hip hop; trap
- Occupations: Record production team; Songwriting team
- Years active: 2010–present
- Labels: Brick Squad Monopoly; Mizay
- Members: Southside; TM88; DY Krazy; Tre Pounds; Smatt Sertified; Gezin; Tarentino; Steezefield; Purps; Hussein; Notorious Pri; MP808; Luxury Tax 50; Pyrex (Whippa); Lukie; Max Lord; Tray Sav 808
- Past members: Jaye Neutron; Lex Luger; Ken Carson; Project X

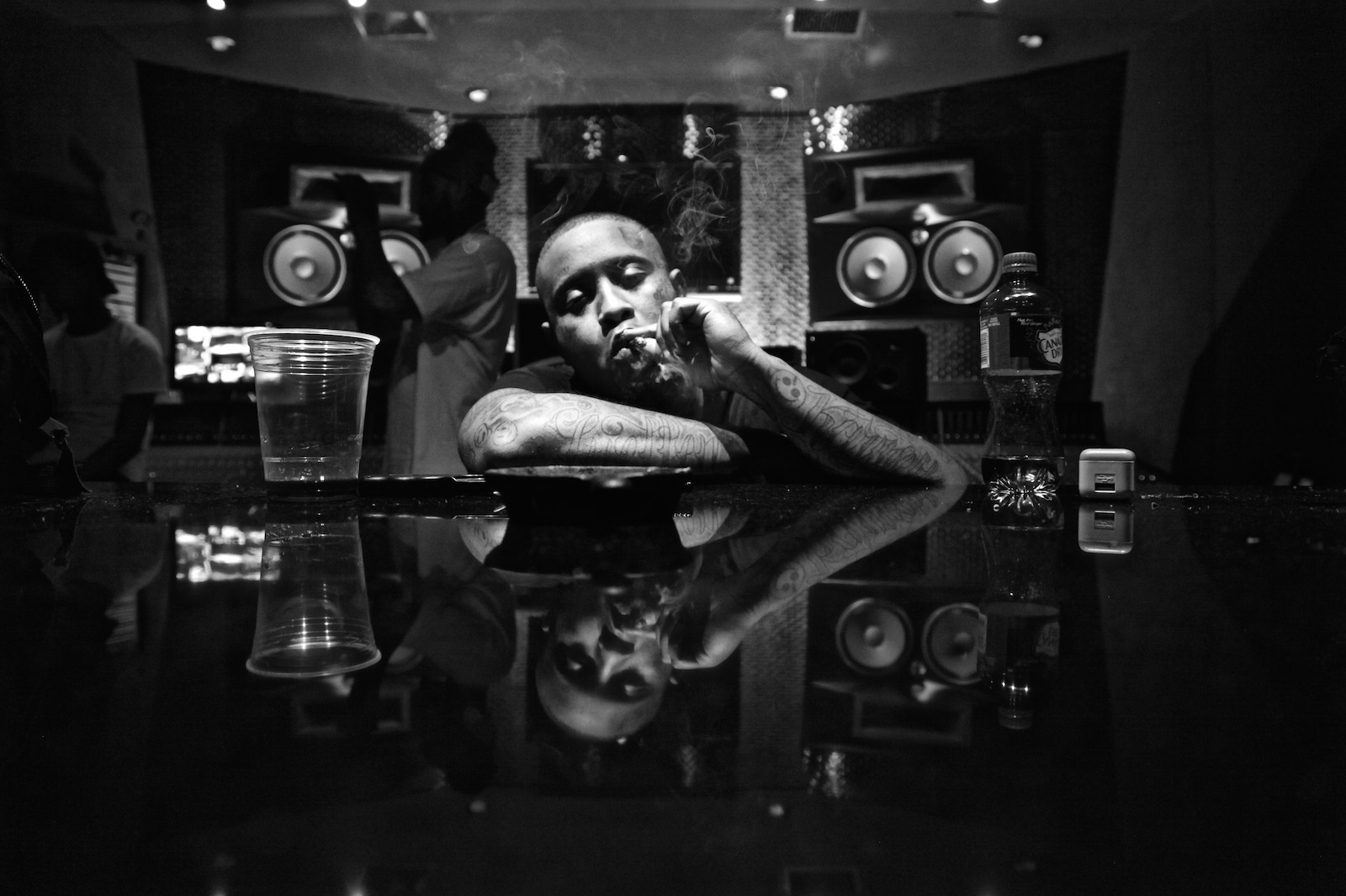
Southside of 808 Mafia in the studio.

808 Mafia is an American record production and songwriting group founded by record producers TM88, Lex Luger, and Southside. Its other members include Fuse 100, Tarentino, Tray Sav, Purps, Swede, Nonstop Da Hitman, and MP808, among others. The group's name originates from the Roland TR-808, a drum machine commonly used in hip-hop music.

== History ==
808 Mafia formed in 2010 when rapper Waka Flocka Flame decided to create a production team, made up of his frequent collaborators Lex Luger and Southside. The group quickly expanded, adding a number of upcoming and affiliated producers, and is currently signed to Flame's label Brick Squad Monopoly.

The group released its debut self-titled instrumental mixtape in 2012, hosted by Trap-A-Holics, which was produced by and introduced 5 of its members: TM88 (credited as Trackman), Be-Bop, Purps, Bobby Beats, and Tarentino. A sequel called 808 Mafia II, announced for release on December 21, 2012 was repeatedly delayed. In March 2013, a trailer for the tape was released to the team's YouTube channel. 808 Mafia II was eventually released on April 23, 2013 via LiveMixtapes, hosted by Trap-A-Holics, DJ Scream and DJ Drama, and featuring production by Southside, TM88, Purps, Tarentino, Fuse, Chris Fresh, King Trice, OG Taxx and Be Bop.

The group’s spoken “808 Mafia” producer tag was voiced by former member Jaye Neutron, the founder of Voice Tag Gods.

== Members ==
- Southside
- TM88
- Tarentino
- Tre Pounds
- $lug
- Pyrex Whippa
- Smatt Sertified
- MP808
- DY Krazy
- 808Sco
- Fuse
- Gezin
- Max Lord
- Nonstop Da Hitman
- Purps
- Steve Lean
- Henney Major
- Ash
- Luxury Tax 50
- Tray Sav 808
- Lukie
- Saiah Woes
- Sacaii
- Shaa Sclizzy
- Northside

=== Former members ===
- Jaye Neutron
- Ken Carson
- Lex Luger
- Chris Fresh

== Discography ==
=== Mixtapes ===
List of mixtapes with selected album details
Title	Album details
808 Mafia	Released: February 2, 2012; Label: Brick Squad Monopoly, Trap-A-Holics; Format: Digital download
