= Southside (music producer) =

American record producer, rapper and songwriter

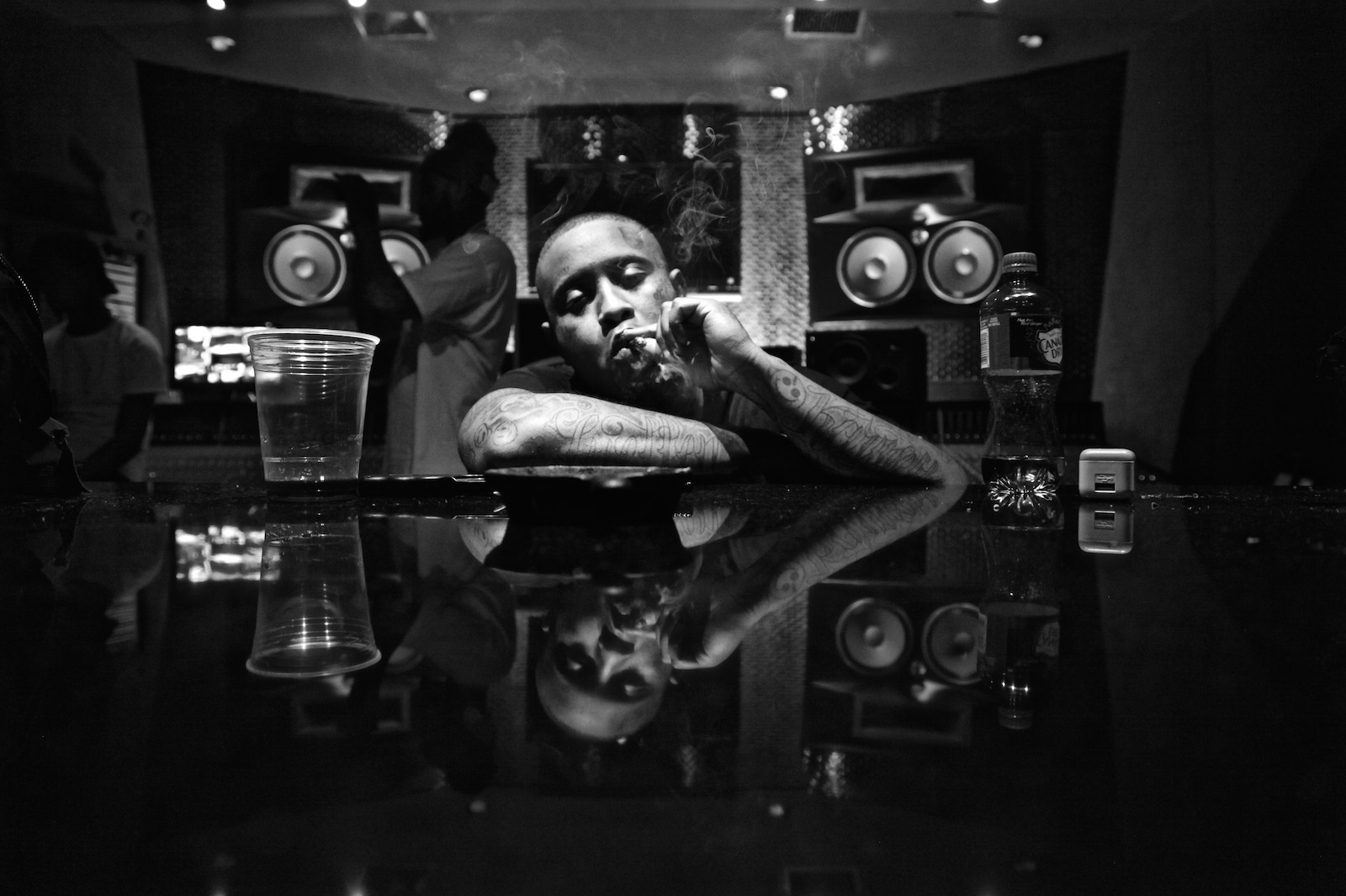
- Southside in 2015

Background information
- Also known as: Young Sizzle; Southside on the Track; 808MafiaBoss; Sizzle
- Born: Joshua Howard Luellen; February 2, 1989 (age 37); Atlanta, Georgia, U.S.
- Genres: Hip hop; trap
- Occupations: Record producer; rapper; songwriter
- Years active: 2003–present
- Labels: Epic; 1017
- Member of: 808 Mafia; So Icey Boyz
- Children: 6

Joshua Howard Luellen (born February 2, 1989), known professionally as Southside (also known as Sizzle or Yung Sizzle), is an American record producer, rapper and songwriter. Based in Atlanta, he is recognized in the music industry for his aggressive, trap-infused production work for prominent hip hop artists. After meeting hometown rapper Waka Flocka Flame, Luellen signed with his record label Brick Squad Monopoly—an imprint of Gucci Mane's 1017 Records—as in-house talent in 2010. Luellen and labelmate, fellow producer Lex Luger established the production team 808 Mafia that same year; it was credited on several commercially successful releases throughout the remaining decade.

As a lead artist, Luellen signed with Epic Records to release his collaborative album with G Herbo, Swervo (2018), which peaked at number 15 on the Billboard 200. His 2022 single, "Hold That Heat" (with Future featuring Travis Scott) marked his first entry—at number 57—on the Billboard Hot 100. Despite not performing on both, he has released several mixtapes as a recording artist.

== Early life ==
Southside was raised in the Southeast section of Atlanta, Georgia. Growing up, he played Little League Baseball but gave up the sport after suffering a concussion when he was hit in the head with a ball. He started making beats when he was 14 years old, when he got his first computer from his uncle.

== Career ==
In his mid-teenage years, Southside started taking music production seriously. He was later discovered by rapper Waka Flocka Flame at the age of 17, and through Waka's connection with Gucci Mane, Luellen was signed to 1017 Records. At the label, Luellen met Lex Luger, a fellow producer for Waka Flocka, and the two laid the production groundwork for Waka Flocka's debut album, Flockaveli (2010). Southside's first major credit was the song "Fuck the Club Up," which appeared on the album.

In 2011, Southside co-produced the track "Illest Motherfucker Alive", from Kanye West and Jay-Z's album Watch the Throne (2011). This gained him wider recognition in mainstream hip hop. He has since worked with artists such as Rick Ross, Jeezy, Wale, Meek Mill, Lil Scrappy, MGK among others. Southside was the main producer of Gucci Mane and Waka Flocka's collaborative album, Ferrari Boyz (2011), as well as Flocka's second album Triple F Life: Friends, Fans & Family (2012).

In January 2013, Southside produced "Millions" – the lead single from Pusha T's mixtape Wrath of Caine. The music video for the song was released on February 10. The song sparked controversy when producer Rico Beats was asked to modify Southside's instrumental for the final version of the song. Southside wasn't notified of the changes, which led to the two producers exchanging threats over Twitter. On Wrath of Caine's official track list, Kanye West was credited as co-producer, instead of Rico Beats. Also in 2013, Southside and TM88 produced the song "Tapout" by Rich Gang from their self-titled album. The song peaked at number 44 on the Billboard Hot 100 and received gold certification by the Recording Industry Association of America (RIAA).

Throughout the early 2010s, Southside's productions have been featured on numerous mixtapes. Produced with TM88, Young Thug's 2014 single "Danny Glover" became one of his breakout hits. By late 2014, Southside's production continued to catapult into Atlanta's hip hop mainstream when Future's mixtape Monster saw widespread praise as Southside handled a quarter of the mixtape's production. Monster standout "Fuck Up Some Commas" was released as a commercial single in March 2015 and spent 20 weeks on the Billboard Hot 100 chart, peaking at number 55 while earning a gold certification by the RIAA.

In 2015, Southside continued to push his trap sound in the hip hop industry ubiquitously, especially on various songs produced by him and his 808 Mafia collective. Luellen was responsible for producing a significant portion of Future's album, DS2, as well as being responsible for producing nine of the ten tracks of Future's mixtape, 56 Nights (2015), in which Southside made the entire project's worth of beats in only one night. In addition, Southside also contributed to the production of three tracks on the collaborative mixtape What a Time to Be Alive by Future and Drake. He would also write and produce the song "Nightcrawler" off Travis Scott's debut album Rodeo.

From 2016 to 2017, Southside would produce two songs for Kanye West's album The Life of Pablo, two songs on Playboi Carti's self-titled mixtape, and two songs on the duo Huncho Jack's debut studio album Huncho Jack, Jack Huncho. Also in 2017, Southside would produce the song "Frat Rules" on Cozy Tapes Vol. 2: Too Cozy. The song received gold certification by the RIAA. He would contribute to the production of three tracks on the collaborative mixtape Super Slimey by Future and Young Thug. Throughout the early 2020s, Southside would contribute to the productions of multiple big albums including Savage Mode II (2020) by 21 Savage and Metro Boomin, Dark Lane Demo Tapes (2020) and For All the Dogs (2023) by Drake, I Never Liked You (2022) by Future, and Deep Thoughts (2025) by Lil Durk.

== Artistry ==
Southside uses the digital audio workstation FL Studio along with custom installed VST plugins to compose his beats. Luellen's distinct signature trap sound is gritty, grimy, and thunderous hip hop street sound which is similar to that of his collaborators, Lex Luger and his group 808 Mafia. Despite such similarities, Luellen's sound is distinctly known to be more gangster, bombastic, gritty, rambunctious, and menacing compared to that of his collaborators. Luellen is known for his dark, belligerent, and menacing hip hop sound coupled with hard hitting 808 kicks, crisp snare drums, fast hi-hats, frantic synthesizers, sinister lead instruments, and colorfully layered ominous orchestration of synthesized brass, hits, stringed, woodwind, and keyboard instruments. Like many other producers Southside uses a musical signature tag on many of the songs he has produced. His main tag is a pitched-up voice saying his name. He also uses his team tag, 808 Mafia and more recently, a sample of the Ironside (1967 TV series) theme song produced by Quincy Jones. Back in the beginning of his career, Southside claimed to complete a single beat in 15 to 30 minutes, but as of 2015, he claims to be able to make a single beat in less than 6 minutes and with no sound. He cites Lil Jon as his favorite producer and enjoys the production work made by Pharrell, Shawty Redd, and Drumma Boy. He is also influenced by the production works of Kanye West, Dr. Dre, Timbaland and Swizz Beatz.

Southside also credits modern technology and internet, particularly through the monetization of music through streaming sites such as SoundCloud, YouTube, Spotify, and Apple Music that help him make a living off of his passion for hip hop music and well as making his own production career possible. Inside the studio, Southside is known for his strong work ethic and strategic marketing acumen when producing beats for artists and getting the finalized track on the mixtape circuit or radio. Since 2013, Southside began to focus on his career as a producer from an entrepreneurial perspective, cultivating talent while learning the ins and outs of the legality in the music production business as well as negotiating deals and making the financial decisions on every track he is responsible for producing.

== Discography ==
=== Collaborative albums ===
Title	Album details	Peak chart positions			
Title	Album details	US	US R&B /HH	US Rap	US IND
Swervo (with G Herbo)	Released: July 27, 2018; Label: Machine Entertainment, Epic, Cinematic; Format: Digital download, streaming	15	8	8	7

=== Mixtapes ===
Title	Mixtape details
Free Agent	Released: July 13, 2014; Label: 808 Mafia; Format: Digital download, streaming
Young Extravagent Nigga	Released: August 9, 2014; Label: 808 Mafia; Format: Digital download, streaming
Free Agent 2	Released: February 2, 2015; Label: 808 Mafia; Format: Digital download, streaming
Free Agent 3	Released: December 9, 2015; Label: 808 Mafia; Format: Digital download, streaming
Hardcore N Hi-Tech	Released: April 9, 2016; Label: 808 Mafia; Format: Digital download, streaming
Lebron Flocka James 4 (with Waka Flocka Flame)	Released: July 26, 2016; Label: Bricksquad Monopoly Money, RBC; Format: Digital download, streaming
I.O.U.	Released: December 25, 2016; Label: 808 Mafia; Format: Digital download, streaming
Trap Ye	Released: February 2, 2017; Label: 808 Mafia; Format: Digital download, streaming
808 Day	Released: August 8, 2017; Label: 808 Mafia; Format: Digital download, streaming
Trap Ye: Season 2	Released: February 2, 2018; Label: 808 Mafia; Format: Digital download, streaming
Blood on the Hills (with Pyrex and 808 Mafia)	Released: October 10, 2020; Label: 808 Mafia; Format: Digital download, streaming
Demons R Us (with Doe Boy)	Released: November 6, 2020; Label: Epic, Freebandz; Format: Digital download, streaming
BREAK THE SILENCE	Released: August 8, 2024; Label: Epic; Format: Digital download, streaming

=== Singles ===
==== As lead artist ====
List of songs, showing year and album name
Title	Year	Peak chart positions					Album
Title	Year	US	US R&B /HH	US Rap	CAN	NZ Hot	Album
"Who Run It" (with G Herbo)	2018	—	—	—	—	—	Swervo
"Focused" (with G Herbo)	2018	—	—	—	—	—	Swervo
"Swervo" (with G Herbo)	2018	—	—	—	—	—	Swervo
"That's How I Grew Up" (with G Herbo)	2018	—	—	—	—	—	Swervo
"Some Nights" (with G Herbo)	2018	—	—	—	—	—	Swervo
"Big Ol' Ass" (with Wolfeworks and Craft)	2018	—	—	—	—	—	Non-album singles
"Order" (with TM88 and Gunna)	2018	—	—	—	—	—	Non-album singles
"Hmmm" (featuring Lil Yachty and Valee)	2018	—	—	—	—	—	Non-album singles
"Can't Control" (with Bass Frequency)	2019	—	—	—	—	—	Non-album singles
"Been Thru This Before" (with Marshmello featuring Giggs and Saint Jhn)	2020	—	—	—	—	—	Non-album singles
"Blood on the Hills" (with Pyrex and 808 Mafia)	2020	—	—	—	—	—	Non-album singles
"Blue Jean Bandit" (with TM88 and Moneybagg Yo featuring Young Thug and Future)	2020	—	—	—	—	—	Non-album singles
"Yessirski" (with Doe Boy)	2020	—	—	—	—	—	Demons R Us
"Tweakin" (with Doe Boy featuring Future)	2020	—	—	—	—	—	Demons R Us
"Don"	2021	—	—	—	—	—	Non-album singles
"No Keys" (featuring JessLøcc)	2021	—	—	—	—	—	Non-album singles
"Lost Remix"	2021	—	—	—	—	—	Non-album singles
"Empty Space" (with 10MilliVision)	2022	—	—	—	—	—	Non-album singles
"Stay with Me" (with 18iker and 808 Mafia)	2022	—	—	—	—	—	Non-album singles
"Hold That Heat" (with Future featuring Travis Scott)	2022	57	16	13	43	9	Non-album singles
"Gimme da Lite" (with Lil Yachty)	2023	—	—	—	—	29	Non-album singles
"President" (with Ken Carson & Destroy Lonely)	2023	—	—	—	—	—	Non-album singles
"—" denotes a recording that did not chart or was not released in that territory.

==== As featured artist ====
List of songs, showing year and album name
Title	Year	Album
"Breakin' U Off" (TM88 and Rich the Kid featuring Ty Dolla Sign, 2 Chainz, and Southside)	2020	
