= Frank's Track =

Song by Kanye West

from the album The Life of Pablo
- Released: March 16, 2016
- Recorded: 2014
- Genre: R&B
- Length: 0:38
- Label: GOOD; Def Jam
- Songwriters: Kanye West; Christopher Breaux; Alan Brinsmead; Magnus Høiberg
- Producers: West; Cashmere Cat; Sinjin Hawke

"Frank's Track" is a song by American musician Kanye West, which was added to his seventh studio album The Life of Pablo (2016) when updates were made to it on March 16, 2016.

== Background ==
A track with guest artist Frank Ocean, the song originally served as the outro to "Wolves". The outro was separated into its own track on March 16, 2016, during the process of updates. However, "Frank's Track" still follows "Wolves" seamlessly, still acting somewhat as an outro rather than an interlude.

Within the same month that version of The Life of Pablo was released, before Ocean's vocals were transferred to the separate track from "Wolves", an alternative version of the song leaked online with him singing in the intro.

== Composition ==
There are no vocals by West on the track at all. Ocean solely sings over production from West, Cashmere Cat and Sinjin Hawke, hence the title "Frank's Track".

Despite the song being an update to The Life of Pablo when it was separated from the original track, no updates were made to it post-release, unlike other songs that witnessed updates.

== Critical reception ==
Christopher Hooton of The Independent described Ocean's vocals on the song as a "stunning contribution". Jake Indiana of Highsnobiety gave a highly positive reception towards the track with the question: "What does it say about our cultural addiction to Frank Ocean that he can turn in a 30-second long studio demo and it becomes an essential part of someone else's album?"

== Commercial performance ==
Upon the release of the album, "Frank's Track" debuted at number 5 on the US Billboard Bubbling Under R&B/Hip-Hop Singles chart and never charted on it again. It also debuted at number 168 in the UK, making the song the lowest charting track from The Life of Pablo in the country.

== Charts ==
Chart (2016)	Peak position
UK Singles (Official Charts Company)	168
US Bubbling Under R&B/Hip-Hop Singles (Billboard)	5
