= Brinsmead =

Brinsmead may refer to:

== People ==
- Duncan Brinsmead (born 1960), Canadian software programmer
- Hesba Fay Brinsmead (1922–2003), Australian author of children's books and environmentalist
- Horace Brinsmead (1883–1934), Australian aviation pioneer
- John Brinsmead (1814–1908), founder of piano manufacturer John Brinsmead and Sons
- Robert Brinsmead (1934), Australian and controversial former Seventh-day Adventist.

== Places ==
- Brinsmead, Queensland, a suburb of Cairns in Australia
