= Chill Bae =

2024 song by Lil Uzi Vert

Song by Lil Uzi Vert

from the album Eternal Atake 2
- Released: November 1, 2024
- Genre: Emo rap; R&B; pop-rap
- Length: 2:18
- Label: Generation Now; Atlantic
- Songwriters: Symere Woods; Magnus Høiberg; Ivison Smith; Luca Berman; Nathaniel Kim
- Producers: Cashmere Cat; Ike Beatz; Gabe Lucas; Crater

Music video
- "Chill Bae" on YouTube

"Chill Bae" is a song by American rapper and singer Lil Uzi Vert, released as the fourteenth track from their fourth studio album, Eternal Atake 2 (2024). The song was produced by Cashmere Cat, Ike Beatz, Gabe Lucas, and Crater. The song reached number 48 on the Billboard Hot 100.

== Composition and lyrics ==
"Chill Bae" is an slowtempo pop rap and emo rap song, where Lil Uzi Vert expresses their past relationship ("Please don't do the most right now, If I hit you up, please don't go ghost right now") and pleading to their partner not to leave them. ("Don't do it to me, don't do it to me (To me, to me, to me) / Baby, don't do it to me, do it to me (Yeah)").

== Music video ==
The official music video was filmed in New York City in October 2024 and released on November 1, 2024. It was directed by Gibson Harazard, who worked with Lil Uzi Vert in the past. The video features them stuck in space with their time in space being filmed as a television show.

== Credits and personnel ==
- Lil Uzi Vert – vocals, songwriting
- Gabe Lucas – vocals, songwriting, production
- Cashmere Cat – production, songwriting
- Ike Beatz – production, songwriting
- Crater – production, songwriting
- Sebran Ghenea – mastering, mixing, recording
- Mike Dean – mastering, mixing, recording

== Charts ==
Chart (2024)	Peak position
US Billboard Hot 100	48
Canada Hot 100 (Billboard)	64
Global 200 (Billboard)	138
US Hot R&B/Hip-Hop Songs (Billboard)	13
