= 9 (Cashmere Cat album) =

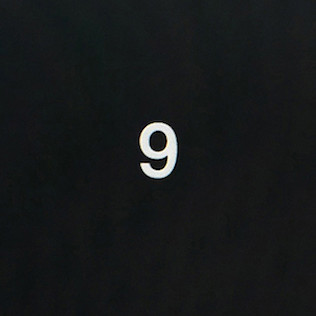

Studio album by Cashmere Cat
- Released: 28 April 2017
- Recorded: 2016–2017
- Genre: Electropop
- Length: 34:40
- Label: Mad Love; Interscope
- Producer: Cashmere Cat; Benny Blanco; Evian Christ; Frank Dukes; Holy Other; Lido; Pop Wansel; Sophie

Cashmere Cat chronology
Wedding Bells (2014)	9 (2017)	Princess Catgirl (2019)

Singles from 9
- 1. "Wild Love" Released: 26 August 2016; 2. "Trust Nobody" Released: 30 September 2016; 3. "Love Incredible" Released: 16 February 2017; 4. "9 (After Coachella)" Released: 30 March 2017; 5. "Quit" Released: 27 April 2017

9 (originally announced under the working title Wild Love) is the debut studio album by Norwegian DJ and record producer Cashmere Cat, released on 28 April 2017, by Mad Love Records and Interscope Records.

== Background ==
In 2012, Cashmere Cat released his debut extended play (EP) Mirror Maru, followed by Wedding Bells two years later. During that time, he gained significant coverage and fellow musician Benny Blanco invited him to Los Angeles in January 2013 to collaborate on production and gave him his first concerts in the United States. The former EP's title track was also featured on the soundtrack to Grand Theft Auto V in 2013.

After producing for other artists such as Kanye West, The Weeknd and Ariana Grande, on 26 February 2016, Cashmere announced that he was working on his untitled debut studio album. On August 24, "Wild Love" was previewed on The Weeknd's Instagram profile. Upon the song's release two days later, Cat unveiled the album's original artwork and confirmed that the album would be titled after the song "Wild Love". However, on 10 April 2017, Cashmere officially renamed the album 9, reflecting the song "9 (After Coachella)", and that production was completed. The official tracklist and release date was revealed on Cashmere's Twitter on April 19.

== Promotion ==
=== Singles ===
On 26 August 2016, "Wild Love" was released as the lead single from the album. The second single, "Trust Nobody", was released on 30 September. "Love Incredible" followed on 16 February 2017 as the third single. "9 (After Coachella)" was released on 30 March as the fourth single.

"Throw Myself a Party" was originally released as a single in promotion of the album, but did not make the official track listing.

On 27 April 2017, "Quit" was released as the fifth single, the song features Ariana Grande. A lyric video was released on the same day.

=== Tour ===
On 4 April, Cashmere uploaded a video on Twitter showcasing dates for a tour entitled the 'Cat Tour'.

== Artwork ==
On 24 August, Cashmere revealed the original artwork for 9, then titled Wild Love, on Twitter. It showed a silhouette of a person walking across a snowed-in road with cars on the sides, while snowing. The official artwork for the album is a photo of the number '9' against a black background displayed on a computer screen.

== Track listing ==
9
No.	Title	Writer(s)	Producer(s)	Length
1.	"Night Night" (featuring Kehlani)	Magnus August Høiberg; Benny Blanco; David Ainley; Kehlani Parrish	Cashmere Cat; Blanco; Holy Other	1:44
2.	"Europa Pools" (featuring Kacy Hill)	Høiberg; Josh Leary; Kacy Hill; Blanco	Cashmere Cat; Evian Christ	3:25
3.	"9 (After Coachella)" (featuring MØ and Sophie)	Høiberg; Blanco; Karen Marie Ørsted; Sophie Xeon	Cashmere Cat; Blanco; Sophie	4:32
4.	"Wild Love" (featuring The Weeknd and Francis and the Lights)	Abel Tesfaye; Høiberg; Blanco; Francis Farewell Starlite	Cashmere Cat; Blanco	3:27
5.	"Quit" (featuring Ariana Grande)	Sia Furler; Frank Romano; Høiberg; Ariana Grande; Blanco	Cashmere Cat; Blanco	4:18
6.	"Infinite Stripes" (featuring Ty Dolla Sign)	Høiberg; Blanco; Brittany Hazzard; Andrew Wansel; Autoro Whitfield; Dexter Wansel; Tyrone Griffin Jr.	Cashmere Cat; Blanco; Pop Wansel; Toro	3:28
7.	"Victoria's Veil"	Høiberg; Alan Parsons; Eric Woolfson	Cashmere Cat	3:16
8.	"Trust Nobody" (featuring Selena Gomez and Tory Lanez)	Høiberg; Hazzard; Daystar Peterson; Selena Gomez; Blanco; Adam Feeney	Cashmere Cat; Blanco; Frank Dukes	3:35
9.	"Love Incredible" (featuring Camila Cabello)	Høiberg; Camila Cabello; Timothy Thomas; Blanco; Theron Thomas; Xeon	Cashmere Cat; Blanco; Sophie	2:59
10.	"Plz Don't Go" (featuring Jhené Aiko)	Høiberg; Dan Vidmar; Jhené Aiko; Cathy Dennis; Blanco	Cashmere Cat; Blanco	3:56
Total length:				34:40

9 (Japanese deluxe edition)
No.	Title	Writer(s)	Producer(s)	Length
11.	"Quit" (featuring Ariana Grande; Seiho remix)	Furler; Romano; Høiberg; Grande; Blanco	Cashmere Cat; Blanco	4:07
12.	"Adore" (featuring Ariana Grande)	Høiberg; Blanco; Ammar Malik; Jeremih Felton; Kenneth Edmonds; Darryl Simmons; Peder Losnegard	Cashmere Cat; Blanco; Lido	3:35
Total length:				42:22

== Charts ==
Chart (2017)	Peak position
Canadian Albums (Billboard)	70
New Zealand Heatseeker Albums (RMNZ)	4
Norwegian Albums (VG-lista)	14
US Billboard 200	119
