= Just Wanna Rock =

2022 single by Lil Uzi Vert

Single by Lil Uzi Vert

from the album Pink Tape
- Released: October 17, 2022
- Recorded: 2022
- Genre: Dance; hip house; Jersey club
- Length: 2:03
- Label: Generation Now; Atlantic
- Songwriters: Symere Woods; Mohamed Camara; Javier Mercado
- Producers: MCVertt; Synthetic

Lil Uzi Vert singles chronology
"Lunchroom" (2022)	"Just Wanna Rock" (2022)	"The End" (2023)

Music video
- "Just Wanna Rock" on YouTube

"Just Wanna Rock" is a song by American rapper Lil Uzi Vert. It was released as the lead single for their third studio album, Pink Tape (2023), through Atlantic Records and Generation Now on October 17, 2022. They previously teased it on the video-sharing app TikTok, where the song gained over 500 million views prior to its release. Written by Lil Uzi Vert alongside American record producers MCVertt and Synthetic, the song incorporates elements of dance, hip house, and Jersey club.

"Just Wanna Rock" received positive reception from music critics, who often praised its production and incorporation of Jersey club. The song was a commercial success in several countries, peaking at number 10 on the US Billboard Hot 100, and charted within the top-40 in Canada, Ireland, Hungary, and New Zealand. It also peaked within the top 30 of the Billboard Global 200. A music video, featuring cameos from AMP members Kai Cenat and Fanum, Philadelphia rapper 2Rare, and Drew Jeeezy, was released on November 18, 2022. Jeeezy, who also choreographed the video, helped popularize the dance associated with the song.

== Background and release ==
Before the release of "Just Wanna Rock", Lil Uzi Vert had previewed the song on TikTok, posting snippets of it to their account. These snippets went viral on the app, with user-created videos featuring the song earning a collective 500 million views in the next three weeks. Due to its success, the song was later officially released as a single on October 17, 2022. Its release followed Lil Uzi Vert's Red & White EP, which was released in July 2022. "Just Wanna Rock" was later included on their third studio album, Pink Tape (2023), featuring as its fifteenth track.

== Composition and lyrics ==
"Just Wanna Rock" is an uptempo Jersey club and hip house song. It sees "Uzi chanting frantically over a synthy, queasy high-BPM beat". The song includes a heavy beat with one short verse and a chorus that is barely above a whisper.

== Critical reception ==
"Just Wanna Rock" received positive reception from music critics. Eddie Fu of Consequence wrote that "Uzi made a clear effort to pay proper homage to Jersey club", pointing out that they enlisted MCVertt to produce it. For Stereogum, Tom Breihan opined that "The track squirms and hammers, and it's oddly catchy in its own way. Time will tell if this marks a full Lil Uzi Vert reinvention or if [they're] just messing around with the sound for now, but it's worth remembering that Lil Uzi Vert comes from Philadelphia and that Philly is right next to Jersey." The Fader's Raphael Helfand called it "a change of pace for Uzi," noting it as "uncharacteristically brief and bare bones, featuring only one quick verse and a hook delivered just above a whisper." Sophie Caraan of Hypebeast wrote that "'70s synths straight out of a thriller/slasher film and a pulsating bass drum [give] the rapper the sonic space to be more dynamic and experimental with [their] sound."

At the 66th Annual Grammy Awards, "Just Wanna Rock" was nominated for Best Rap Song, but ultimately lost to "Scientists & Engineers" by Killer Mike and André 3000.

== Music video ==
=== Background ===
The song's music video began filming on November 2, 2022, in New York City. Lil Uzi Vert held a flash mob in the city's SoHo, Manhattan neighborhood, drawing the attention of fans to feature in the video. Kenna McCafferty of Paper described the event as a shutdown of the city, writing that it "drew the city's best dancers, the crew's most avid fans and the niche-est micro-influencers around for a chance to Jersey Rock with the Philly-raised rapper." The video was released on November 18, 2022, and was directed Gibson Harazard, who has worked with Lil Uzi Vert in the past. It features cameos from AMP members Kai Cenat and Fanum, Philadelphia rapper 2Rare, and Drew Jeeezy, who originally popularized the dance.

Jeeezy, who choreographed the music video, first thought of its dance after hearing the song's original TikTok preview. He predicted that he would go viral if he created a dance to go along with it, but did not expect it to have any longevity. After uploading videos of himself dancing to it, Jeeezy estimates that it took roughly six hours for his dance to start gaining traction, to which he "started seeing people interact with the first of my few videos", prompting him to "just ke[ep] pushing it to where more people would see it." Afterwards, Lil Uzi Vert contacted Jeeezy on TikTok through an alternate account, trying to get his phone number so he could be featured in the official music video. Jeeezy flew to New York to feature in and choreograph the video, which was his first time choreographing. When asked about the video's dance by HipHopDX, Lil Uzi Vert said they included the dance because "that’s how cool kids from Philly and Jersey dance, so I'm only a product of my environment. I'm just shining a light on that culture."

=== Reception ===
The music video for "Just Wanna Rock" received positive reception. For XXL, C. Vernon Coleman II wrote that the video "matches the energy of the uptempo New Jersey club vibes of the vigorous single. With stunning CGI effects, heart-pumping dance sequences and a more than likely unauthorized street scene featuring thousands of extras, the vigor is unmatched." McCafferty lauded the visuals as "a seamless fusion of sci-fi and club chaos", writing that both the song and its video "catches listeners in an endless loop." It won Video of the Year at the 2023 XXL Awards.

== In other media ==
During the entirety of her Renaissance World Tour, Beyoncé incorporated "Just Wanna Rock" during a dance break while performing "Diva". The song was used in the first trailer for the 2023 DC Extended Universe film Blue Beetle.

== Credits and personnel ==
Credits adapted from Tidal.

- Lil Uzi Vert – vocals, songwriting
- MCVertt – production, songwriting, programming
- Synthetic – production, songwriting, programming
- Benjamin Thomas – mixing, recording
- Don Cannon – mixing
- Colin Leonard – mastering
- Feez – engineering assistance
- Frank Holland – engineering assistance

== Charts ==
=== Weekly charts ===
Weekly chart performance for "Just Wanna Rock"
Chart (2022–2024)	Peak position
Australia (ARIA)	39
Canada Hot 100 (Billboard)	20
Germany (GfK)	91
Global 200 (Billboard)	26
Hungary (Single Top 40)	30
Ireland (IRMA)	23
Latvia (LAIPA)	11
Lithuania (AGATA)	17
Netherlands (Single Tip)	3
New Zealand (Recorded Music NZ)	36
Portugal (AFP)	85
South Africa (RISA)	86
Switzerland (Schweizer Hitparade)	70
UK Singles (Official Charts)	30
UK Hip Hop/R&B (Official Charts)	15
US Billboard Hot 100	10
US Hot R&B/Hip-Hop Songs (Billboard)	5
US Pop Airplay (Billboard)	29
US Rhythmic Airplay (Billboard)	3

=== Year-end charts ===
Year-end chart performance for "Just Wanna Rock"
Chart (2023)	Position
Canada (Canadian Hot 100)	44
Global 200 (Billboard)	79
US Billboard Hot 100	28
US Hot R&B/Hip-Hop Songs (Billboard)	13
US Rhythmic (Billboard)	14

== Certifications ==
Certifications for "Just Wanna Rock"
Region	Certification	Certified units/sales
Australia (ARIA)	Platinum	70,000^{‡}
Canada (Music Canada)	3× Platinum	240,000^{‡}
France (SNEP)	Gold	100,000^{‡}
Italy (FIMI)	Gold	50,000^{‡}
New Zealand (RMNZ)	Platinum	30,000^{‡}
Poland (ZPAV)	Gold	25,000^{‡}
Portugal (AFP)	Gold	5,000^{‡}
United Kingdom (BPI)	Gold	400,000^{‡}
United States (RIAA)	4× Platinum	4,000,000^{‡}
^{‡} Sales+streaming figures based on certification alone.
