= Eternal Atake 2 =

2024 studio album by Lil Uzi Vert

Studio album by Lil Uzi Vert
- Released: November 1, 2024
- Recorded: 2024
- Genres: Hip hop; trap
- Length: 43:19
- Labels: Generation Now; Atlantic; Roc Nation
- Producers: Brandon Finessin; Bryceunknown; Cashmere Cat; Darko IVX; Dylxn; Emphasis; Henney Major; Ike Beatz; J Dolla; Leqn; Lil 88; Gabe Lucas; Madd Maks; Martyr; MCVertt; Mental; Charlie Puth; Rima; Shinju; Sohi; Trgc; Trillion; USKIDS; WondaGurl; y2tnb

Lil Uzi Vert chronology
Pink Tape (2023)	Eternal Atake 2 (2024)	Maverick Almost Forever (2026)

Eternal Atake 2 is the fourth solo studio album by American rapper Lil Uzi Vert, released on November 1, 2024, through Generation Now and Atlantic Records. The album features a sole guest appearance from Big Time Rush, while its production was primarily handled by Cashmere Cat and Brandon Finessin, with support from Henney Major, Lil 88, MCVertt, Charlie Puth, WondaGurl, and several other producers. The album serves as a sequel to Lil Uzi Vert's second studio album, Eternal Atake (2020), which was released four years earlier, and follows their third studio album, Pink Tape (2023).

== Background and recording ==
Upon the release of Eternal Atake 2, Uzi appeared in an interview with Complex during which they revealed that the motivation behind the sequel stems from the prequel being leaked prior to its release. They stated that they had the desire to perform the prequel on tour, however, due to the COVID-19 pandemic, it was not possible, therefore they always knew that they "[were] going to come back and do Eternal Atake 2". When asked about what the sequel meant to them, Uzi stated:

Eternal Atake was so special to me. The first Eternal Atake was perfect, and I didn't have the team I have today and everything got leaked and everyone had it already. And it was just the songs that the artistry I was trying to be on, I was trying to push out a narrative that I really didn't care, and that wasn't the case. That was some good stuff, and if I knew what now, back then, I would’ve just put the whole leaked album out anyway instead of canceling it and then being like, “I need to make a whole new album.” Should have just put that whole album out and worked on my album. But me being stuck in my ways, I was like, “No, I can do it all over again.” And I actually did do good all over again, but I knew there was going to be a sequel just from that point on. And then when I finally dropped it, it fell into the COVID [era]. I know myself, especially back then, so by the time the world opened back up, of course the [songs] that I like a lot, I'm going to put them in my show. But I really didn't get to perform the whole album. So I always knew in my head I was going to come back and do Eternal Atake 2.

Uzi also appeared in an interview with Rolling Stone in which they stated that with Eternal Atake 2, they wanted to get back to their roots and that the record was for Uzi to "really get off". When asked about the recording process of the album, they revealed that "everything is newly recorded up until you get to the bonus track, and I went 50/50". Uzi stated that following the release of Pink Tape, they went through "different phases" and that there was no overlap between Pink Tape and Eternal Atake 2.

== Music and lyrical themes ==
=== Composition and production ===
Eternal Atake 2 is predominantly a trap album. The record incorporates elements of pop rap and R&B, much like Uzi's earlier work. The majority of the album was produced by Cashmere Cat and Brandon Finessin, with occasional support from Henney Major, Lil 88, MCVertt, WondaGurl, and Charlie Puth, who also provides additional vocals on some tracks.

=== Themes ===
Similarly to its prequel, Eternal Atake 2 follows the themes of science fiction and cosmic reality. In comparison to Uzi's previous records, on Eternal Atake 2, they covered the themes of heartbreak and were more "in touch" with their own emotions. During their interview with Complex, Uzi expanded on the album's themes:

I don't even really know. I told you when this all happened, I was in outer space. Now [that] I'm back, I'm going to digest everything right now and experience it with the fans. And I apologize in advance to a lot of my fans. I knew that they all felt the energy that I was giving out, and basically, I wasn't giving it my all. And now I'm back giving it my all, and I don't know why it wasn't [before]. Maybe it was that one fan, before I deleted my Instagram, they was like, “Uzi, you need to get back on your shit.” And that was the last thing I saw, and it was just like a Rocky movie, and I was just figuring everything out. I love my fans, they’re all I got.

=== Songs ===
"Chill Bae" is described as "apologetic, confessional and refreshingly human", and is regarded as the best track on the record by Billboard. On the track, Uzi gives their fans an insight into their personal life and career as it strays away from the album's theme of sci-fi and focuses on themselves. On "Black Hole", Uzi expresses their concern about becoming trapped in a pregnancy, while straying away from its theme to plead for fellow rapper Young Thug's freedom.

== Release and promotion ==
After the release of Pink Tape, Uzi teased their upcoming fifth mixtape Barter 16 after Uzi had promised that if the project went number 1 on the Billboard 200, this would be released next. The mixtape would be inspired by Young Thug's April 2015, Barter 6. On August 16, 2023, Uzi shared the artwork cover for the mixtape on Instagram, which appears similar to the artwork of Barter. On August 19, 2023, multiple songs from Barter 16 were leaked on the internet, leading to it eventually being scrapped. In October 2023, Uzi teased the release of Luv Is Rage 3 during their Pink Tape Tour while revealing that the album would be their last and that they planned to retire following its release. However, the project was later scrapped.

In an August 2024 interview, Uzi revealed that they were working on Eternal Atake 2. In the same month, Uzi called into Kai Cenat and IShowSpeed's Twitch stream and confirmed that they were finishing the work on their album, which was believed to be Luv Is Rage 3 at the time. On October 16, it was revealed that Uzi was shooting the album's trailer. In the same month, on Apple Music, the cover arts for Uzi's previously released projects would appear with the letter "2" on them, teasing the release of the album. On October 24, Uzi officially announced the album after sharing the artwork and trailer. On October 27, Uzi revealed the album's official track listing via a cryptic Instagram story. Upon the release of the album, Uzi released the video for "Chill Bae".

== Critical reception ==
Professional ratings
Aggregate scores
Source	Rating
Metacritic	48/100
Review scores
Source	Rating
AllMusic	2/5 stars
Clash	5/10
Pitchfork	4.7/10
Rolling Stone	3/5 stars

Eternal Atake 2 was met with underwhelming critical reviews compared to its predecessor(s). At Metacritic, which assigns a normalized rating out of 100 to reviews from professional publications, the album received an average score of 48, indicating "mixed or average" reception based on five reviews.

Writing for Clash, Robin Murray wrote that the album "feels like an attempt to reset the dials", however, the record "seems to prove the law of diminishing returns" and reminds the listener of "what has changed in their work – and, crucially, what hasn’t". Murray wrote that, on the record, Uzi attempts to move from the shadows of the album's prequel, however, the record "fails through messy execution". He wrote that "at times, the record feels rushed" and criticized the record's mixing. Concluding his review, Murray wrote that Eternal Atake 2 "exhibit[s] more signs of the Lil Uzi Vert tail-off" and that "the quality control has dimmed, and the sense of direction exhibited on their early work has waned".

== Commercial performance ==
Eternal Atake 2 debuted at number three on the Billboard 200 chart, opening with 59,000 album-equivalent units consisting of 3,000 album sales and 56,000 streaming units (calculated from the 76.43 million on-demand streams streams the album's tracks received). Eternal Atake 2 was blocked from the top spot by Tyler, the Creator's Chromakopia and Sabrina Carpenter’s Short n’ Sweet. This prevented Uzi from achieving their 4th number-one record. The album is the lowest-selling in its first week of their career.

== Track listing ==
Eternal Atake 2 track listing
No.	Title	Writer(s)	Producer(s)	Length
1.	"We Good"	Symere Woods; Magnus Høiberg; Ebony Oshunrinde	Cashmere Cat; WondaGurl	2:05
2.	"Light Year (Practice)"	Woods; Brandon Veal; Kidus Adal	Brandon Finessin; USKIDS	2:44
3.	"Meteor Man"	Woods; Høiberg; Jalan Lowe; Vladimir Grishin	Cashmere Cat; Lil 88; Henney Major	3:47
4.	"Paars in the Mars"	Woods; Høiberg; Ivison Smith	Cashmere Cat; Ike Beatz	3:00
5.	"The Rush" (featuring Big Time Rush)	Woods; Høiberg; Veal; Markos Muniz; Emil Kaiser; Daniel Greene	Cashmere Cat; Brandon Finessin; Madd Maks; Shinju; Sohi	3:06
6.	"Not an Option"	Woods; Veal; Leon Balint; Numair Alan	Brandon Finessin; Leqn; Mental	2:30
7.	"She Stank"	Woods; Høiberg; Lowe; Dylan Jansen; Jae Lawler; Lawrence Parker; Scott Sterling	Cashmere Cat; Lil 88; Dylxn; Martyr	2:05
8.	"Mr Chow"	Woods; Veal; Jai'el Blackmon; Michael Alberro	Brandon Finessin; J Dolla; Emphasis	2:57
9.	"Lyft Em Up"	Woods; Veal; Bryce Frizzell; Travis Barker	Brandon Finessin; BryceUnknwn; y2tnb	2:44
10.	"Chips and Dip"	Woods; Veal	Brandon Finessin	2:46
11.	"Black Hole"	Woods; Veal; Khalil Key; Rima	Brandon Finessin; Trillion; Rima	2:48
12.	"Chill Bae"	Woods; Høiberg; Smith; Luca Berman; Nathaniel Kim	Cashmere Cat; Ike Beatz; Gabe Lucas; Crater	2:18
13.	"Goddard Song"	Woods; Høiberg	Cashmere Cat	2:20
14.	"PerkySex"	Woods; Høiberg; Charlie Puth	Cashmere Cat; Puth	2:50
15.	"Conceited"	Woods; Høiberg; Puth	Cashmere Cat; Puth	3:10
16.	"Space High"	Woods; Høiberg; Mohamed Camara; Jammarius Hill; Darko Ivančević	Cashmere Cat; MCVertt; Trgc; Darko IVX	2:11
Total length:				43:21

Sample credits

- "We Good" contains an interpolation from "Very Online Guy", written by Alec O'Hanley and Molly Rankin, as performed by Alvvays.
- "She Stank" contains an interpolation from "9mm", written by Paul Beauregard and Louis Mario Freese, as performed by Memphis Cult, Groove Dealers, and SPLYXER.
- "PerkySex" contains an interpolation from "Servin", written by Jatavia Johnson, Antoine Edwards, Ayatullah Muhammad, Byron Thomas, Christopher Lee, Donny Flores, Elon Brown, Juan Madrid, and Kyle Reed, as performed by JT.

== Personnel ==
- Lil Uzi Vert – vocals
- Mike Dean – mastering (all tracks), mixing (tracks 1–11)
- Serban Ghenea – mixing (tracks 12, 13, 15)
- Cashmere Cat – production, mixing, executive producer, recording
- Argenis "Trilla" Peguero – recording
- Big Time Rush – vocals (track 5)
- Gabe Lewis – additional vocals (track 12)
- Charlie Puth – additional vocals (track 15)

== Charts ==
=== Weekly charts ===
Weekly chart performance for Eternal Atake 2
Chart (2024)	Peak position
Australian Albums (ARIA)	70
Australian Hip Hop/R&B Albums (ARIA)	17
Austrian Albums (Ö3 Austria)	27
Belgian Albums (Ultratop Flanders)	57
Canadian Albums (Billboard)	11
Dutch Albums (Album Top 100)	49
German Albums (Offizielle Top 100)	99
Icelandic Albums (Tónlistinn)	29
Irish Albums (IRMA)	86
Italy (Musica e dischi)	1
Lithuanian Albums (AGATA)	30
New Zealand Albums (RMNZ)	19
Polish Albums (ZPAV)	51
Portuguese Albums (AFP)	62
Swiss Albums (Schweizer Hitparade)	11
UK Albums (Official Charts)	47
US Billboard 200	3
US Top R&B/Hip-Hop Albums (Billboard)	2

=== Year-end charts ===
Year-end chart performance for Eternal Atake 2
Chart (2025)	Position
US Top R&B/Hip-Hop Albums (Billboard)	86

== Release history ==
Release dates and formats for Eternal Atake 2
Region	Date	Format	Ref.
Various	November 1, 2024	CD; Digital download; streaming	
