= Back for You =

Back for You may refer to:

- "Back for You", a 2019 song by Cashmere Cat from Princess Catgirl
- "Back for You", a 2012 song by One Direction from Take Me Home
