= Charleston White =

American comedian

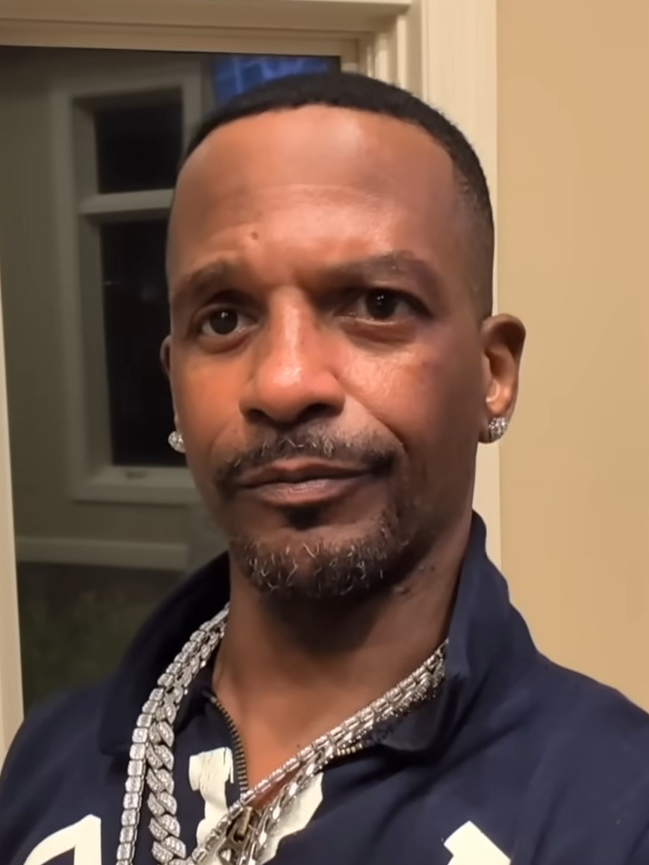
- White in 2025
- Born: Charleston White; May 17, 1977 (age 49); Fort Worth, Texas, U.S.
- Education: Giddings State School; Texas Wesleyan University (BCJ)
- Spouse: Tamara White
- Children: 5

Comedy career
- Genres: Observational comedy; black comedy; insult comedy

Charleston White (born May 17, 1977) is an American comedian, entrepreneur, and motivational speaker. He was born in Fort Worth, Texas, and experienced health challenges in childhood, including an accident that led to the loss of his right eye. At age 14, he was involved in a robbery that resulted in a murder charge and time in juvenile detention.

After his release, he studied criminal justice at Texas Wesleyan University and co-founded Helping Young People Excel (HYPE), a youth outreach organization. He later became known for his social media presence, where he shares controversial views on hip hop, black culture, and current events.

== Early life and career ==
White was born on May 17, 1977, in Fort Worth, Texas. His mother worked at General Motors, and his parents separated early in his life. At the age of five, he was injured in an accident when the lid of a washing machine suddenly opened, causing him to fall inside and suffer severe injuries to his lower body. Two years later, he lost his right eye and began wearing an ocular prosthesis. Due to his health complications, he was educated by a private tutor until sixth grade.

At age 14, White took part in a robbery at a Foot Locker in Arlington, Texas, with a group of teenagers. They stole athletic jackets and were chased by a store clerk. As they attempted to flee, a man named Michael Levey approached them in a car to recover the stolen items. White and another teen, Antoine Doolittle, threw the jackets out of the car, after which Doolittle shot and killed Levey. White later testified against Doolittle and was convicted of murder for his involvement and sent to a Texas Youth Commission facility. While he was in juvenile detention, his 17-year-old brother, Kev White, was convicted of murder and sentenced to 99 years in prison.

He later spoke before the state legislature, recounting how he became a gang leader while in juvenile detention. He attended Giddings State School, where he remained until his eighteenth birthday, and although he was initially recommended for transfer to the adult prison system, four correctional officers testified on his behalf, advocating for him to stay at the school. As a result, he was allowed to remain, where he was able to continue his rehabilitation.

White later reflected that remaining in juvenile detention helped him better "understand his own thoughts, feelings and actions and gave him empathy for others". After being released in 1998 at age 21, he attended Texas Wesleyan University majoring in criminal justice. He founded the organization Helping Young People Excel (HYPE) along with Miguel Moll, who was also sent to prison at a young age, and became a motivational speaker.

== Entertainment career ==
White's comedy career took off after he began sharing opinions on entertainers in the industry. He became known for his controversial takes on hip hop, politics, and social justice issues.

In July 2022, White claimed that he had maced rapper Soulja Boy during a confrontation after Soulja Boy and his entourage approached him for a conversation, with White later going on Instagram Live to joke about the incident. In response, Soulja Boy said that White was afraid of him. The feud escalated as both began trading insults on social media, and White filed a police report against Soulja Boy. The incident was later referenced in the 21 Savage song "3AM on Glenwood," from the 2022 collaborative album Her Loss with Drake. In November 2022, during an appearance on DJ U Go Crazy's show, White pulled a gun on the host after being confronted over his comments about killed rappers, demanding his money back. White later admitted that the gun was fake and claimed the act was part of his online persona.

White was featured on Lil Uzi Vert's 2023 song "Suicide Doors" from the album Pink Tape, through a sample taken from an interview with Say Cheese TV, in which White made homophobic and transphobic remarks aimed at them. White later stated that Lil Uzi Vert's team paid him a "pretty nice check" for the sample and that he continues to receive royalty payments for its use.

In August 2023, White collaborated with livestreamers Adin Ross and xQc. During the visit, he was involved in an argument with a waitress and also argued with fellow streamer IZIPrime. After, during a TikTok livestream, White made antisemitic remarks directed at Ross, which drew criticism. Days later, White apologized for what he said and appeared to cry, saying he was just playing a character online.

In December 2023, White was attacked during a comedy performance following an argument with audience members about the 2020 NBA Finals held during the COVID-19 pandemic. In an Instagram Live session with streamer Adin Ross, White later claimed that the individuals who attacked him were his uncle and nephew and that he feared for his life during the incident, which is why he struck one of them with a vase in self-defense.

== Personal life ==
White is married to Tamara White. He has two children from a previous relationship. Tamara publicly supported him after two of his former employees accused him of infidelity.

On July 21, 2026, White said he was shot at while attending a birthday party in the Fifth Ward neighborhood of Houston, Texas. He stated that he was not injured and planned to report the incident to the Federal Bureau of Investigation. He said that the shooting was over him making several explicit remarks about J. Prince.

On a YouTube video he sent multiple nude pictures of his private area to FDA Houston Crip.

== Legal issues ==
In March 2023, White was stopped by law enforcement after being accused of kidnapping women and holding them hostage with illegal firearms. The FBI interviewed him and searched his mother's home as part of the investigation. White later said that they were able to track him through his Instagram Live, where he brandished a gun and delivered a racist rant directed at rapper China Mac and Asian people. After the rant, White and DJ Akademiks’s comedy show in New York City was canceled.

In October 2024, White was arrested and charged with animal cruelty and two counts of aggravated assault with a deadly weapon, being accused of torturing a cat by pepper spraying it. In response, White posted a video addressing the charges, claiming the animal cruelty allegation was false and stating that he had purchased a gun to protect his wife.

In February 2025, White was arrested in Texas on aggravated assault charges and was booked at a corrections center in the Fort Worth area, where he was held without bond. He was released a few days later and announced on Instagram Live that the charges had been dropped.
