= Suicide Doors (Lil Uzi Vert song) =

2023 song by Lil Uzi Vert

Song by Lil Uzi Vert

from the album Pink Tape
- Released: June 30, 2023
- Genre: Trap metal
- Length: 4:19
- Label: Atlantic; Generation Now
- Songwriters: Symere Woods; Alejandra Ghersi Rodríguez; Brandon Veal; Leqn; Yugen
- Producers: Brandon Finessin; Arca; Leqn; Yugen

"Suicide Doors" is a song by American rapper Lil Uzi Vert from their third studio album Pink Tape (2023). It was produced by Brandon Finessin of Working on Dying, Arca, Leqn and Yugen.

== Background ==
The song was previewed during Lil Uzi Vert's performance at Summer Smash 2023. It features audio from comedian and social media personality Charleston White's interview with Say Cheese, in which he made homophobic and transphobic comments in a rant taking aim at Uzi. Lil Uzi Vert and Atlantic Records called White and Say Cheese TV to get authorization for using it in the song before it was released. White later revealed that Uzi's team cut him a "pretty nice check" and have to pay him royalty checks for the sample.

== Composition and lyrics ==
The song begins with a sample of the rant A synth line is then played, as Lil Uzi Vert throws a few taunts, before a series of guitar riffs are played through the remainder of the track. Lyrically, Uzi defends their individuality and dismisses those who disapprove of it.

== Reception ==
Robin Murray of Clash wrote, "'Flooded the Face' and 'Suicide Doors' are an emphatic opening couplet – Lil Uzi Vert flip between caustic revelation and hilariously surreal word play, the squelching electronics carrying bass-heavy bombast."

In an interview on the podcast We Are Florida, Charleston White said he was "happier than a bitch" when asked about his reaction to the sample. He additionally expressed gratitude, saying "Shout out to [Lil Uzi Vert]. 'Cause I wasn't speaking [favorably] of him, right? So he could've got [offended] and be like, 'Nah, fuck that [guy]."

== Charts ==
Chart performance for "Suicide Doors"
Chart (2023)	Peak position
Canada Hot 100 (Billboard)	52
Global 200 (Billboard)	59
Ireland (IRMA)	91
New Zealand Hot Singles (RMNZ)	5
US Billboard Hot 100	25
US Hot R&B/Hip-Hop Songs (Billboard)	10
