= Wolves (Kanye West song) =

Song by Kanye West featuring Sia and Vic Mensa

from the album The Life of Pablo
- Released: July 29, 2016
- Recorded: January 7, 2014 – 2016
- Length: 5:01
- Label: GOOD; Def Jam
- Songwriters: Kanye West; Sia Furler; Victor Mensah; Magnus August Høiberg; Alan Soucy Brinsmead; Noah Goldstein; Elon Rutberg; Malik Yusef; Freddy Wexler; Cydel Young; Ryan McDermott; Mike Dean; Kirby Lauryen; Pat Reynolds; Caroline Shaw
- Producers: West; Cashmere Cat; Sinjin Hawke; Dean; Goldstein (add.); Shaw (add.)

Music video
- "Wolves" on YouTube

"Wolves" is a song by American rapper Kanye West, featuring vocals from Australian singer Sia and fellow American rapper Vic Mensa, from his seventh studio album, The Life of Pablo (2016). It was produced by West, Cashmere Cat, and Sinjin Hawke and was originally planned to be the opening track to The Life of Pablo. West debuted the song on February 12, 2015, at a fashion show where he also premiered his new Adidas shoe. The presentation was broadcast live to more than 40 locations around the world.

"Wolves" became the second confirmed track from the album and originally featured Sia and Vic Mensa. The initial album version introduced a new verse from West and an additional outro from Frank Ocean, omitting Sia and Vic Mensa's contributions. However, in March 2016, the album was updated with a new version of the song that reinstated Sia and Vic Mensa's verses. Frank Ocean's outro has been split into a separate track, titled "Frank's Track", which appears after "Wolves" on the track list.

Upon its release, "Wolves" received widespread acclaim from music critics. Commercially, the track would top the Bubbling Under Hot 100 chart, alongside charting at number 39 on the Hot R&B/Hip-Hop Songs chart and at number 88 on the UK singles chart. The song's music video, directed by Steven Klein, was released on the 29th of July, 2016. The song was used in the trailer for the Netflix crime drama series Ozark (2017).

== Background ==
Caroline Shaw, who has a writing credit on "Wolves", created an alternate version of the song that went unused on the album:

"There’s also another version of Wolves I made in [Rick Rubin's bus-turned-recording-studio] during those couple of days. It’s not what’s on the album; it’s more of a pairing with Father Stretch My Hands, and it puts a line from Frank Ocean ('life is precious') right in the heart of the song, which is where I believe it should go."

== Composition ==
"Wolves" was produced by West, Cashmere Cat and Sinjin Hawke, and originally featured vocals by Australian singer and songwriter Sia and Chicago rapper Vic Mensa. The song has been described as "melancholic" and "somber" with a slower beat, a minimal arrangement, and a heavily Auto-Tuned bridge. The "lurching" chorus is performed by Vic Mensa and includes the lyrics, "I'm just bad. Bad for you." Sia performs a "bluesy" rendition of West's words approximately two minutes and three seconds into the song.

The original album version featured a rap from West and a moody outro from Frank Ocean, which replaced Vic Mensa and Sia's verses. An alternate version, however, was leaked online including Frank Ocean, Vic Mensa, and Sia. Unlike the album version, Frank Ocean's outro is featured at the start of the song, and West's rap is omitted.

In March 2016, over a month after the album's release, West updated the album's Tidal track list with a reworked version of "Wolves", which includes the previously removed vocals from Vic Mensa and Sia. The outro sung by Frank Ocean was split into a separate track called "Frank's Track".

== Music video ==
The music video for the song, directed by Steven Klein, was released on July 29, 2016 as part of a Balmain advert campaign. It resonates with the emotional feel of the song as it features West and his wife Kim Kardashian in tears. The video also features Alessandra Ambrosio, Joan Smalls, Jourdan Dunn, Josephine Skriver, Kylie Jenner, Sia, and Vic Mensa. The video is black-and-white and sees West and his wife wearing the same outfits designed for their appearance at 2016's Met Gala.

== Critical reception ==
"Wolves" received widespread acclaim from music critics. Brittany Spanos of Rolling Stone said the song was reminiscent of West's work on his fourth studio album 808s & Heartbreak (2008). The song was branded by Nosheen Iqbal of The Guardian as having 'brutal Yeezus-ish minimalism'. Spencer Kornhaber of The Atlantic viewed the song as being 'gorgeous and beguiling'. The Independent's Christopher Hooton wrote of the song: 'This is such a beautiful song and the off-kilter drums in the background throw it off balance in a good way.'

== Commercial performance ==
"Wolves" debuted at number 1 on the US Billboard Bubbling Under Hot 100 upon the release of The Life of Pablo. Within the same week, it debuted at number 39 on the US Hot R&B/Hip-Hop Songs chart. The song also charted on the UK Singles Chart upon the album's release, reaching number 88.

== Live performances ==
West was one of several musical guests for the Saturday Night Live 40th Anniversary Special, which aired on NBC in February 2015. He performed "Jesus Walks" and "Only One", then Sia and Mensa joined him for the live debut of "Wolves". Due to the "claustrophobic, starkly black-and-white" set, all three vocalists crawled and crouched throughout the song due to their limited mobility, and Sia wore a large white bob wig.

== Credits and personnel ==
Credits reflect the updated March 2016 version; adapted from Tidal.

- Producers – Kanye West, Sinjin Hawke, Cashmere Cat, Mike Dean, Noah Goldstein
- Co-producers – Goldstein, Dean
- Composers and lyricists – Magnus Høiberg, Vic Mensa, Ryan McDermott, Freddy Wexler, Malik Yusef, Lincoln Minott, Dean, Alan Brinsmead, Goldstein, Elon Rutberg, Lincoln "Sugar" Minott, West, Sia, Christopher Breaux
- Additional procurers – Plain Pat, Boi-1da
- Recording engineer – Goldstein, Matt Larson, Dean
- Assistant recording engineer – Jordan Heskett
- Mixer – Manny Marroquin

== Charts ==
| Chart (2016) | Peak position |
|---|---|
| Sweden Heatseeker (Sverigetopplistan) | 13 |
| UK Singles (Official Charts) | 88 |
| UK Hip Hop/R&B (Official Charts) | 25 |
| US Bubbling Under Hot 100 (Billboard) | 1 |
| US Hot R&B/Hip-Hop Songs (Billboard) | 39 |
| US On-Demand Streaming Songs (Billboard) | 31 |

== Certifications ==
Certifications for "Wolves"
| Region | Certification | Certified units/sales |
|---|---|---|
| Denmark (IFPI Danmark) | Gold | 45,000^{‡} |
| New Zealand (RMNZ) | Gold | 15,000^{‡} |
| United Kingdom (BPI) Frank Ocean version | Silver | 200,000^{‡} |
| United States (RIAA) | Platinum | 1,000,000^{‡} |
^{‡} Sales+streaming figures based on certification alone.
