= Flooded the Face =

Song by Lil Uzi Vert

from the album Pink Tape
- Released: June 30, 2023
- Recorded: 2017
- Length: 3:13
- Label: Atlantic; Generation Now
- Songwriters: Symere Woods; Donald Cannon
- Producers: Don Cannon; Harold Harper

Audio video
- "Flooded the Face" on YouTube

"Flooded the Face" is a song by American rapper and singer Lil Uzi Vert. It was released on June 30, 2023, and serves as the opening track from their third studio album Pink Tape. The song was produced by Don Cannon and Harold Harper. Originally intended for Luv Is Rage 2, the track never made the final cut.

== Composition ==
An opening track with a "cosmic-sounding beat" as well as a "soaring, vowel-emphasizing hook", "Flooded the Face" sees Uzi boasting about their success and wealth. Lyrics primarily focus on "materialistic possessions". The rapper directly tackles rumors regarding their sexuality, bragging about their body count with women. In doing so, they address speculations of them being gay, asking the listener, "how could you ever say Lil Uzi Gay?". Despite several braggadocious lines, Uzi also shows love to their girlfriend JT.

== Critical reception ==
Ahmad Davis of Rap-Up thought the track was a "poetic intro". Likewise, Robin Murray at Clash called "Flooded the Face" (along with "Suicide Doors") "an emphatic opening", emphasizing on their "hilariously surreal word play". Slant's Paul Attard described the rapper's form on the song as "classic Uzi".

== Credits and personnel ==
- Lil Uzi Vert – vocals, songwriting
- Don Cannon – production, songwriting, mastering, mixing, recording
- Harold Harper – production, songwriting,

== Charts ==
=== Weekly charts ===
Weekly chart performance for "Flooded the Face"
Chart (2023)	Peak position
Australia (ARIA)	98
Canada Hot 100 (Billboard)	26
Global 200 (Billboard)	21
Ireland (IRMA)	61
New Zealand (Recorded Music NZ)	35
Poland (Polish Streaming Top 100)	96
Slovakia Singles Digital (ČNS IFPI)	61
Switzerland (Schweizer Hitparade)	98
UK Singles (OCC)	63
US Billboard Hot 100	11
US Hot R&B/Hip-Hop Songs (Billboard)	4

=== Year-end charts ===
Year-end chart performance for "Flooded the Face"
Chart (2023)	Position
US Hot R&B/Hip-Hop Songs (Billboard)	81
