= Adore (Cashmere Cat song) =

Single by Cashmere Cat featuring Ariana Grande

from the album 9 (Japanese deluxe)
- Released: March 3, 2015
- Recorded: January 23, 2015
- Genre: Electronic; R&B
- Length: 3:35
- Label: Friends Keep Secrets; Interscope
- Songwriters: Kenneth "Babyface" Edmonds; Jeremih Felton; Magnus August Høiberg; Benjamin Levin; Peder Losnegård; Ammar Malik; Darryl Simmons
- Producers: Cashmere Cat; Lido; Benny Blanco

Cashmere Cat singles chronology
"Ice Rink" (2015)	"Adore" (2015)	"Wild Love" (2016)

Ariana Grande singles chronology
"One Last Time" (2015)	"Adore" (2015)	"E più ti penso" (2015)

Audio video
- "Adore" on YouTube

"Adore" is a song recorded by Norwegian DJ and record producer Cashmere Cat, featuring vocals by American singer-songwriter Ariana Grande. It was written and produced by Cashmere along with Benny Blanco and Lido, and co-written by Ammar Malik, Jeremih Felton, Kenneth "Babyface" Edmonds and Darryl Simmons. "Adore" was digitally released on March 3, 2015 by Friends Keep Secrets and Interscope Records.

== Background and composition ==
"Adore" is the second collaboration between Cashmere Cat and Grande, the first being the song "Be My Baby", from Grande's second studio album, My Everything (2014). The song features a heavy dose of breathy, falsetto vocals, atmospheric elements, subtle dance beats and punches of clattering percussion, and a vocal interpolation of Johnny Gill's classic R&B hit "My, My, My".

== Live performances ==
The song was first presented on Grande's The Honeymoon Tour where Cashmere Cat performed the song with Grande during his opening act. It was also performed as an interlude for the Sweetener World Tour for leg 2 and 3

== Critical reception ==
USA Today ranked the song as one of the 50 best in 2015, writing, "Grande’s towering vocals have never sounded better than on this offbeat R&B track."

== Commercial performance ==
Commercially, the song peaked at number 93 on the US Billboard Hot 100, becoming Cashmere Cat's first appearance on that chart.

Chart (2015)	Peak position
Belgium Urban (Ultratop Flanders)	27
US Billboard Hot 100	93
