= Wild Love (Cashmere Cat song) =

Single by Cashmere Cat featuring the Weeknd and Francis and the Lights

from the album 9
- Released: 26 August 2016
- Genre: Electronic
- Length: 3:27
- Label: Mad Love; Interscope
- Songwriters: Magnus Høiberg; Abel Tesfaye; Francis Starlite; Benjamin Levin
- Producers: Cashmere Cat; Benny Blanco

Cashmere Cat singles chronology
"Adore" (2015)	"Wild Love" (2016)	"Trust Nobody" (2016)

The Weeknd singles chronology
"Low Life" (2016)	"Wild Love" (2016)	"Starboy" (2016)

Francis and the Lights singles chronology
"Summer Friends" (2016)	"Wild Love" (2016)	"See Her Out (That's Just Life)" (2016)

"Wild Love" is a song by Norwegian DJ and record producer Cashmere Cat, featuring vocals by Canadian singer the Weeknd and American pop project Francis and the Lights. It was released on 26 August 2016, as the lead single from Cashmere's debut studio album, 9 (2017). The track was written by The Weeknd, Cashmere Cat, Benny Blanco, and Francis Starlite. It was produced by Cashmere Cat and Blanco. It is the first of five collaborations between Cashmere Cat and The Weeknd, being followed by several tracks off The Weeknd's third studio album Starboy (2016). The song was noted by several critics as being reminiscent of Imogen Heap's 2005 hit single "Hide and Seek".

== Background and release ==
The demo to "Wild Love" was created in roughly three minutes after Cashmere Cat toyed around with a plugin instrument known as a harmonizer that was introduced to him by Francis Starlite. Originally nervous to present the song to Tesfaye, Høiberg was at first hesitant to begin work on the track. Nonetheless, "Wild Love" was first teased on 24 August 2016, through the Weeknd's Instagram account. The song was then released two days later, with it originally being promoted as the title track for Cashmere Cat's first studio album and its single artwork being the original artwork for the aforementioned project. Thus why it shares the same single artwork with "Trust Nobody", the second single off the studio album.

== Critical reception ==
In a positive review, Drew Norman from The Young Folks called the song a triumph, saying that the track was a prime example of the Weeknd's singing ability. Meanwhile, in a more mixed review, Andy Beta from Pitchfork criticized the vocal mixing of the song, describing it as rupturing the gaseous effect of the single. Danny Schwartz from HotNewHipHop listed it as one of Cashmere Cat's ten essential productions, calling it the best of the five collaborations between Høiberg and Tesfaye.

== Chart performance ==
The single was the first song by Cashmere Cat and Francis and the Lights (and only for the latter) to chart on the US Billboard Dance/Electronic Digital Song Sales chart. Meanwhile, it was the second single to place on the respective chart for the Weeknd.

== Credits and personnel ==
Credits adapted from Tidal and liner notes.

- Cashmere Cat – songwriter, producer
- The Weeknd – featured vocals, songwriter
- Francis Farewell Starlite – featured vocals, songwriter
- Benny Blanco – songwriter, producer

== Charts ==
Chart (2016)	Peak position
US Dance/Electronic Digital Song Sales (Billboard)	15

== Release history ==
Region	Date	Format	Label(s)	Ref.
Various	26 August 2016	Digital download; streaming	Mad Love; Interscope	
