= Love Incredible =

2017 single by Cashmere Cat

Single by Cashmere Cat featuring Camila Cabello

from the album 9
- Released: February 17, 2017
- Recorded: 2017
- Genre: Electropop; R&B; pop
- Length: 2:59
- Label: Interscope; Mad Love
- Songwriters: Magnus Høiberg; Camila Cabello; Benjamin Levin; Sophie Xeon
- Producers: Cashmere Cat; Benny Blanco; Sophie

Cashmere Cat singles chronology
"Trust Nobody" (2016)	"Love Incredible" (2017)	"9 (After Coachella)" (2017)

Camila Cabello singles chronology
"Bad Things" (2016)	"Love Incredible" (2017)	"Hey Ma" (2017)

Audio video
- "Love Incredible" on YouTube

"Love Incredible" is a song by Norwegian DJ and producer Cashmere Cat, featuring American singer Camila Cabello. It is Cabello's first solo single since leaving the girl group Fifth Harmony. The electropop and R&B-pop song was released on February 17, 2017, through Interscope Records and Mad Love as the third single from Cashmere Cat's debut studio album, 9 (2017).

== Background and composition ==
"Love Incredible"
The electropop and R&B-pop song consists of an electronic dance music chorus where Cabello's falsetto vocals are layered on top of glassy keys and a muted bassline.

In May 2016, Camila Cabello and Benny Blanco spent time in a recording studio, where they recorded "Love Incredible". The song was leaked on January 30, 2017, and is Cabello's first solo single since leaving Fifth Harmony in December 2016.

Musically, "Love Incredible" is an electropop and R&B-pop song, which contains elements of dance. The song begins mellow with Cabello using a high vocal register, accompanied by synthesizers that pick up with a thumping drumbeat. The music is built around a grinding electronic dance music chorus, where Cabello sings over glassy keyboards and a muted bassline, "This love's incredible, credible / Have a little mercy on me, baby / You got me wanting more, wanting more / Of your love".

== Critical reception ==
Kat Bein from Billboard compared the song to Cashmere's previous releases, describing it as a "tune that sounds like it fits in perfectly with the rest of the work from his upcoming debut LP 9." Christina Lee of Idolator praised the production and Cabello's vocals on the song, calling it "dramatic, though dreamy electro-pop that still has enough sing-along moments for summer festival playlists to come, with processed vocals featured alongside Camila's own falsetto. Danny Schwartz of the site HotNewHipHop also praised the song's production and wrote that it is "an accurate summation of the Cashmere Cat aesthetic: a strawberry Starbust of a pop song with an unexpected and enrapturing vocoder-gasm appended to the end." Sasha Geffen from MTV News gave a different opinion about Cabello's voice on the song, writing: "Cashmere Cat whips Camila's voice through a bevy of effects, making her sound more like a giddy android than a girl-group expat."

== Credits and personnel ==
Credits adapted from the liner notes of 9.

Publishing

- Published by Infinite Stripes / Back Hair Music Publishing (BMI) / Administered by Universal Music Publishing (BMI), Please Don’t Forget To Pay Me Music / Administered by Universal Music Publishing (GMR), MSMSMSM Ltd (PRS) / Brill Building Music Publishing LLC all rights administered by Kobalt Music Group., Milamoon Songs (BMI), TNT Explosive / UMPG (ASCAP), TNT Explosive / UMPG (ASCAP)

Management

- Camila Cabello appears courtesy of Epic Records, a division of Sony Music Entertainment

Personnel

- Cashmere Cat – DJ, songwriting, production
- Camila Cabello – vocals, songwriting
- Benny Blanco – songwriting, production
- Sophie – songwriting, production
- R. City – songwriting

== Charts ==
Chart performance for "Love Incredible"
Chart (2017)	Peak position
New Zealand Heatseekers (RMNZ)	5
Scotland Singles (OCC)	59
Spain (Promusicae)	45
