= Maverick Almost Forever =

2026 EP by Lil Uzi Vert

Maverick "Almost Forever"

EP by Lil Uzi Vert
- Released: July 31, 2026
- Genres: Hip-hop; trap; rage
- Length: 23:03
- Labels: Cor(E); Roc Nation
- Producers: Akumi; Alex Cheyz; ALX; Bass Kids; Cade; Chi Chi; Gabe Lucas; Giannii; Ging; LilDirtyCup; Ronny J; Supah Mario; SupaManley; Venexxi; ZeeGoinCrazy

Lil Uzi Vert chronology
Eternal Atake 2 (2024)	Maverick "Almost Forever" (2026)

Maverick "Almost Forever" is the fourth extended play (EP) by the American rapper Lil Uzi Vert. It was released on July 31, 2026, which corresponded with their 31st birthday. The EP followed several previews and the cancellation of Vert's Lollapalooza set. A melodic trap EP, it received mixed reviews from music critics.

== Background and release ==
Before the EP's release, Lil Uzi Vert previewed several upcoming songs on their Instagram, including behind-the-scenes footage. They also debuted a snippet of their then-unknown song, distinct for Vert's British accent, at Lyrical Lemonade's Summer Smash 2026 Rap Festival in Chicago, which would eventually end up on the EP as "London - Bonus".

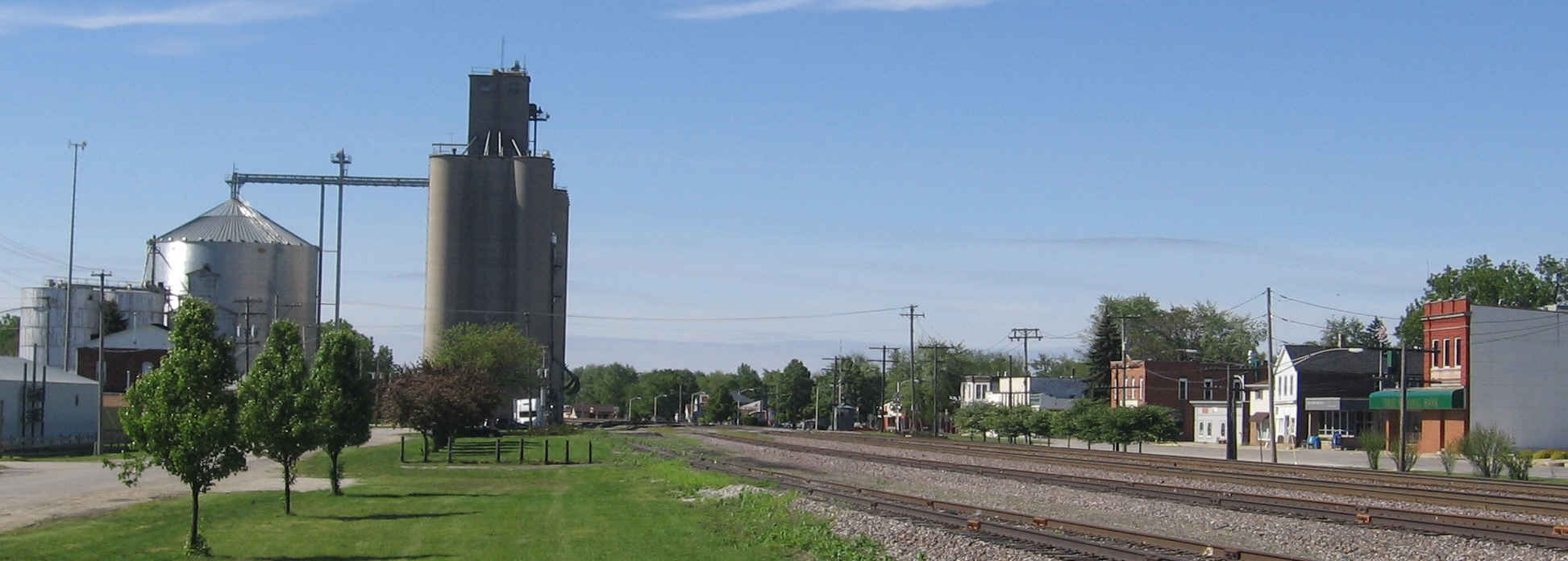
The EP was released following the cancellation of Lil Uzi Vert's set at Grant Park, Chicago for Lollapalooza.

The EP came after the cancellation of their Lollapalooza set at Grant Park, Chicago. A surprise release, it was shared on July 31, 2026, corresponding with Vert's birthday. It was released by Cor(E) in partnership with Roc Nation. The cover art features hidden text on a child's eye, reportedly saying "Album After This".

== Composition and lyrics ==
Maverick "Almost Forever" is a melodic trap EP. Gabriel Bras Nevares of HotNewHipHop described the EP as reminiscent of Vert's previous works, noting on its buzzy instrumentals and energetic deliveries. Lyrically, Vert celebrates their recent accomplishments and milestones.

== Critical reception ==
Professional ratings
Review scores
Source	Rating
AllMusic	2/5 stars
The Needle Drop	1/10 (Note: According to Fantano, he rated it a "light to decent one".)
Pitchfork	7.4/10

Maverick Almost Forever received divided reviews from music critics. Anthony Fantano rated the EP a one out of ten, stating that "Lil Uzi Vert's creative legacy is kind of in question these days", and called it one of their worst and most pointless projects ever released. He also said that the seventh track, "Say It Was", features "relatable sentiments about losing loved ones", and that the bonus track, "London", sees the artist rapping with a mocking British accent. Similarly, AllMusic criticized the EP's importance, though noting that "the deep fans will find something to love here."

In a favourable review, Quincy Dominic of Ratings Game Music praised the EP's emotion, nostalgic production, and entertainment value, though criticizing its inconsistent track listing. Hattie Lindert of Pitchfork praised the EP as Vert's best project since Eternal Atake (2020), crediting its rapping, instrumentation, writing that "Uzi manages to evoke their greatest successes in spirit, not interpolation."

== Commercial performance ==
The EP sold 23,000 first-week Album-equivalent units, debuting at number 25 on the US Billboard 200 and number 8 on the US Top R&B/Hip-Hop Albums chart. It also reached the number-one spot on Apple Music's top U.S. Hip-Hop/Rap albums chart.

== Track listing ==
All lyrics are written by Lil Uzi Vert.

No.	Title	Writer(s)	Producer(s)	Length
1.	"Maverick Intro"	Symere Woods; Adam Feeney; Ronald Spence Jr.; Jonathan Priester; Andrew Aydt; Alex Nguyen	Ronny J; Supah Mario; Venexxi; ALX	2:55
2.	"Go !"	Woods; Zakar Johnson	ZeeGoinXrazy	3:03
3.	"Poured"	Woods; Johnson	ZeeGoinXrazy	3:00
4.	"223"	Woods; Chidi Osondu; Cade Blodgett; Aleksandr Kolomiec; Gian Baba; Dmitrii Shakin	Chi Chi; Cade; Alex Cheyz; Giannii; Akumi	2:31
5.	"Yoko"	Woods; Johnson; Richon Sankey; Chiebele Nwosu	ZeeGoinXrazy; LilDirtyCup; SupaManley	2:53
6.	"Gas. Brake."	Woods; Johnson	ZeeGoinXrazy	2:51
7.	"Say It Was"	Woods; Johnson	ZeeGoinXrazy	2:40
8.	"London" (Bonus)	Woods; Luka Berman; Shakir Robinson	Gabe Lucas; Bass Kids	3:11
Total length:				23:03

== Charts ==
Chart performance
Chart (2026)	Peak position
US Billboard 200	25
US Top R&B/Hip-Hop Albums (Billboard)	8
