= Trust Nobody =

Single by Cashmere Cat featuring Selena Gomez and Tory Lanez

from the album 9
- Released: 30 September 2016
- Recorded: 2016
- Genre: Electropop
- Length: 3:38
- Label: Mad Love; Interscope
- Songwriters: Magnus Høiberg; Brittany Hazzard; Daystar Peterson; Selena Gomez; Benjamin Levin; Adam Feeney
- Producers: Cashmere Cat; Benny Blanco; Frank Dukes

Cashmere Cat singles chronology
"Wild Love" (2016)	"Trust Nobody" (2016)	"Love Incredible" (2017)

Selena Gomez singles chronology
"We Don't Talk Anymore" (2016)	"Trust Nobody" (2016)	"It Ain't Me" (2017)

Tory Lanez singles chronology
"Flex" (2016)	"Trust Nobody" (2016)	"Radar" (2016)

"Trust Nobody" is a song by Norwegian DJ and record producer Cashmere Cat, featuring vocals by American singer Selena Gomez and Canadian singer Tory Lanez. It was released on 30 September 2016 as the second single from Cashmere's debut studio album, 9 (2017). The song was written by Cashmere Cat, Starrah, Lanez, Gomez, Benny Blanco, and Frank Dukes. It was produced by Cashmere Cat, Blanco and Dukes.

== Music video ==
The videoclip of the song was released on 16 November 2016. It was directed by Jake Schreier and starring five dancers Jasmin Williams, Talia Koylass, Raphael Thomas, Dominique McDougal and Wally Pham dancing on a stage built in the desert.

== Credits and personnel ==
- Cashmere Cat – songwriter, producer
- Selena Gomez – featured vocals, songwriter
- Tory Lanez – featured vocals, songwriter
- Benny Blanco – songwriter, producer
- Frank Dukes – songwriter, producer
- Starrah – songwriter
- Chris "Tek" O'Ryan - vocal producer, engineer

== Charts ==
Chart (2016)	Peak position
Australia (ARIA)	46
Belgium (Ultratip Bubbling Under Flanders)	30
Canada Hot 100 (Billboard)	61
Czech Republic Singles Digital (ČNS IFPI)	52
France (SNEP)	174
Ireland (IRMA)	69
Italy (FIMI)	92
Netherlands (Single Top 100)	86
Slovakia Singles Digital (ČNS IFPI)	53
Sweden Heatseeker (Sverigetopplistan)	9
UK Singles (Official Charts)	92
US Bubbling Under Hot 100 (Billboard)	6
US Bubbling Under Mainstream Top 40 (Billboard)	5

== Certifications ==
Region	Certification	Certified units/sales
New Zealand (RMNZ)	Gold	15,000^{‡}
United States (RIAA)	Gold	500,000^{‡}
^{‡} Sales+streaming figures based on certification alone.

== Release history ==
Release history for "Trust Nobody"
Region	Date	Format	Label	Ref.
Various	September 30, 2016	Digital download; streaming	Mad Love; Interscope	
Italy	December 15, 2016	Radio airplay	Universal	
