= Red & White (EP) =

EP by Lil Uzi Vert
- Released: July 22, 2022
- Recorded: 2016–2022
- Genre: Hip hop; trap; cloud rap
- Length: 30:59
- Label: Generation Now; Atlantic
- Producer: BeatByJeff; Bally; Brandon Finessin; DJ Mustard; Don Cannon; Dun Deal; Esko; Hitkidd; Maaly Raw; Oogie Mane; ShaunGoBrazy; Sonny Digital

Lil Uzi Vert chronology
Pluto × Baby Pluto (2020)	Red & White (2022)	Pink Tape (2023)

Professional ratings
Review scores
Source	Rating
AllMusic	3.5/5 stars

Red & White is the third extended play by American rapper and singer Lil Uzi Vert. It was released through Generation Now and Atlantic Records on July 22, 2022, and was previewed through several singles on SoundCloud starting from July 16, 2022. Production was handled by Sonny Digital, Maaly Raw, Dun Deal, Don Cannon, DJ Mustard, and among others. The EP marks their first solo body of work since their second studio album Eternal Atake (2020), and serves as the predecessor to their third studio album, Pink Tape (2023).

== Release and singles ==
Uzi announced the project and revealed its cover artwork via their Instagram on July 12, 2022. The EP’s first lead single "Space Cadet" released on Uzi's SoundCloud on July 16, 2022. The second promotional single, "I Know", was released on their SoundCloud two days later. The third promotional single, "Flex Up" was released the next day. Red & White’s final promotional single, "Hittin My Shoulder" was released via SoundCloud on July 20, 2022, whilst the EP's first single, "Space Cadet", became available on all streaming platforms. Within the first few hours of July 22, 2022, five more tracks were periodically released through Uzi's SoundCloud. The EP was then released onto all streaming platforms a few hours later, which omitted the four promotional singles and included a new song, "Cigarette". On July 25, 2022, "Cigarette" was added onto the SoundCloud release of the EP . The next day, the four promotional singles were added onto the streaming version of the EP, and Uzi confirmed the completion of the EP's tracks after.

== Commercial performance ==
Red & White debuted at number 23 on the US Billboard 200, earning 20,000 album-equivalent units in its first week.

== Track listing ==
Red & White – Soundcloud edition track listing
No.	Title	Writer(s)	Producer(s)	Length
1.	"Space Cadet"	Symere Woods; Brandon Veal; Bally; ShaunGoBrazy	Brandon Finessin; Bally; ShaunGoBrazy	2:46
2.	"I Know"	Woods; Sonny Uwaezuoke	Sonny Digital	3:06
3.	"Flex Up"	Woods; Jamaal Henry	Maaly Raw	2:47
4.	"Hittin My Shoulder"	Woods; David Cunningham	Dun Deal	2:26
5.	"Cigarette"	Woods; Anthony Holmes Jr.; Donald Cannon	Hitkidd; Don Cannon	3:02
6.	"For Fun"	Woods; Jefferson Ogendi	BeatByJeff	3:08
7.	"Believe Me"	Woods; Henry	Maaly Raw	2:38
8.	"Issa Hit"	Woods; Jordan Ortiz; Veal	Oogie Mane; Brandon Finessin	4:03
9.	"Glock in My Purse"	Woods; Dijon McFarlane	DJ Mustard	3:44
10.	"Final Fantasy"	Woods; Veal; Oliver Brown	Brandon Finessin; Esko	3:10
Total length:				30:59

Notes

- "Believe Me" was replaced with "Cigarette" on streaming versions of the EP due to sample clearance issues.
- "Cigarette" was added to the Soundcloud later in July as track 5, moving tracks "For Fun" and later by one.
- "Final Fantasy" is stylized as "F.F." on the streaming release of the EP.

Sample credits

- "Final Fantasy" contains samples from "Blinded by Light (From "Final Fantasy XIII")" performed by Masashi Hamauzu.
- "Believe Me" contains samples from the song "Sezam" ("Sesame") music by Maria Ganeva, performed by rock band "Sezam" ("Sesame") from Bulgaria.
- "Cigarette" interpolates "Pon De River", performed by O'Neal Bryan, performed by Elephant Man.

== Charts ==
Chart performance for Red & White
Chart (2022)	Peak position
Canadian Albums (Billboard)	55
US Billboard 200	23
US Top R&B/Hip-Hop Albums (Billboard)	13

== Release history ==
Release dates and formats for Red & White
Region	Date	Format	Edition	Ref.
Various	July 23, 2022	Digital download; streaming	5 tracks	
Various	July 26, 2022	Digital download; streaming	9 tracks	
Various	August 19, 2022	CD	9 tracks	
