= Electronic Music Awards & Foundation Show =

American music award

- Awarded for: Outstanding excellence in Electronic Dance Music
- Country: United States
- Presented by: Electronic Music Awards Foundation
- Website: https://emafawards.com/

The Electronic Music Awards & Foundation was an awards and charity event announced on January 28, 2016 by Paul Oakenfold and TV4 Entertainment, headed by executive producer Paul Duddridge and CEO Jon Cody. Russell Thomas served as the program's director. The EMAF has no affiliation with The Electronic Music Awards and is not an extension of EMAF.

== History ==
The event, originally called the "Electronic Music Awards & Foundation Show," was formed by Oakenfold, Duddridge, and Cody to give the Dance and EDM community an awards show of their own as well as giving back to the global community with the proceeds going to charities. It was scheduled to take place at the SLS Hotel in Los Angeles, California on April 14, 2016, and air on Fox as a one-hour special on April 23, 2016. This would have marked the first time a major awards show devoted to the Dance/EDM community aired on American television.

On April 12, 2016, the event was postponed. In a statement from the organizers "As this is the first year of the awards, we have the luxury of flexibility, which we are taking advantage of to decide the optimal timetable to present the awards. With this opportunity, we felt that it would be better to represent the electronic music calendar in the fall rather than the spring."

== Nomination List ==
On February 18, 2016, seven categories were announced, with Calvin Harris, Kygo, DJ Snake, and Galantis tied with two nominations apiece. With the 2017 announcement, there would be eleven categories.

=== 2016 (announced at the time) ===
==== Single of the Year ====
- Calvin Harris & Disciples - "How Deep Is Your Love"
- The Chainsmokers featuring ROZES - "Roses"
- Galantis - "Runaway (U & I)"
- Kygo featuring Parson James - "Stole the Show"
- Major Lazer & DJ Snake featuring MØ - "Lean On"

==== Album of the Year ====
- Alina Baraz & Galimatias - Urban Flora
- Calvin Harris - Motion
- Disclosure - Caracal
- Galantis - Pharmacy
- Jamie xx - In Colour

==== Radio Show of the Year ====
- BBC Radio 1 Essential Mix
- BPM with Geronimo – Sirius XM
- Danny Howard – BBC Radio 1’s Dance Anthems
- Diplo and Friends - BBC Radio 1Xtra
- Jason Bentley – Morning Becomes Eclectic – KCRW

==== Festival of the Year ====
- Creamfields - Daresbury, England
- Electric Daisy Carnival - Las Vegas, Nevada, USA
- Sónar - Barcelona, Spain
- The BPM Festival - Playa del Carmen, Mexico
- Ultra Music Festival - Miami, Florida, USA

==== DJ of the Year ====
- Carl Cox
- Diplo
- Dixon
- DJ Harvey
- Skrillex

==== Best New Artist ====
- Bob Moses
- DJ Snake
- Jauz
- KSHMR
- Kygo

==== Best Club of the Year ====
- Amnesia
- Fabric
- Omnia
- Sound LA
- Zouk
