= Duncan Brinsmead =

Canadian software programmer (born 1960)

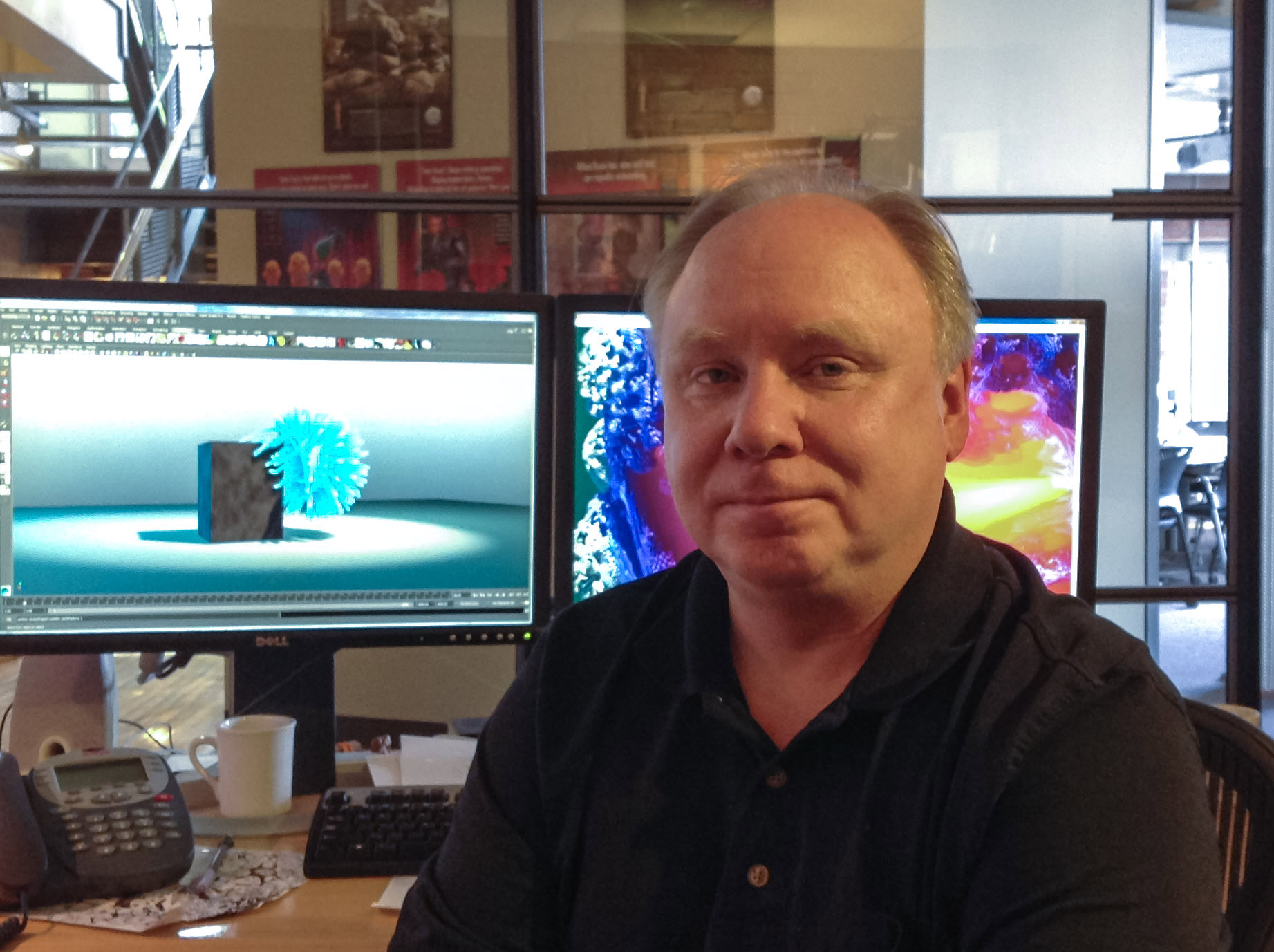
Duncan Brinsmead (2013)

Duncan Brinsmead (born January 26, 1960, in Edmonton, Alberta) is a Canadian software programmer and developer of simulations of natural environments in 3D computer graphics (CGI). He created the Maya Paint Effects for digitally painting instances like plants or hair in a virtual 3D environment. In 2008, together with Jos Stam, Julia Pakalns and Martin Werner he received an Academy Award for Technical Achievement for the design and implementation of the Maya Fluid Effects system. Fluid Effects are based on the simulation of fluid mechanics in software and used for simulating natural phenomena such as fog, steam or smoke.

== Education and career ==
Duncan Brinsmead is the son of Alan and Aveleigh Brinsmead, and grandson of Percy and Fern Brinsmead. He was born in Edmonton, Alberta. From 1977 to 1980 he attended the faculty of music at the University of Toronto as a French Horn performance major. In 1983, he graduated with a Bachelors in French Horn Music Performance from the Curtis Institute of Music in Philadelphia and in 1984 received his Masters in music performance (French Horn) from Juilliard School of Music in New York City.

In the early 1980s Duncan Brinsmead used a first generation graphics computer by Silicon Graphics to create an animation showing fractals: "Fractal Fantasy". The film short was shown at the SIGGRAPH Art and Video show.

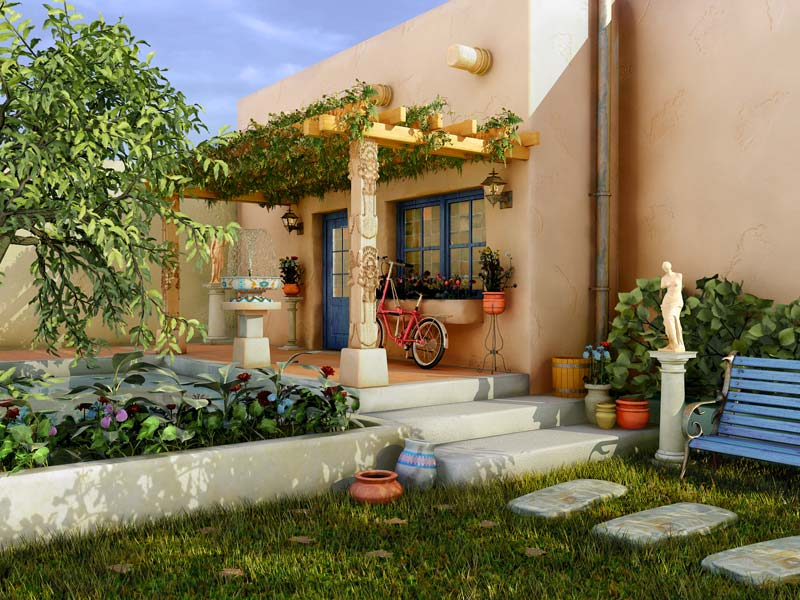
Digital scene with massive use of Paint Effects plants and grass.

As a self-taught software programmer, he joined the computer graphics company Alias Systems Corporation (later "Alias Inc.", "Alias Wavefront", today Autodesk) and contributed to the development to computer graphics software such as Power Animator, Terra Forma and Maya. As a principal scientist at Autodesk's R&D department in Toronto he invented Maya Paint Effects, Maya Hair, and Maya Toon. His more recent works are Maya nHair, nCloth (for the simulation of clothing) and the Nucleus dynamics solver framework. Brinsmead's tools are being used all over the film industry and especially in special effects houses such as Weta, Industrial Light & Magic, Disney, Pixar and DreamWorks. His effects simulated natural topics in countless movies like Spiderman, and Toy Story, Shrek, Alice in Wonderland.

Duncan Brinsmead lives in Toronto and is married to Anne-Marie. Their son, Alan Brinsmead, is a musician living in Spain.
