= Cashmere Cat =

Norwegian DJ & producer (born 1987)

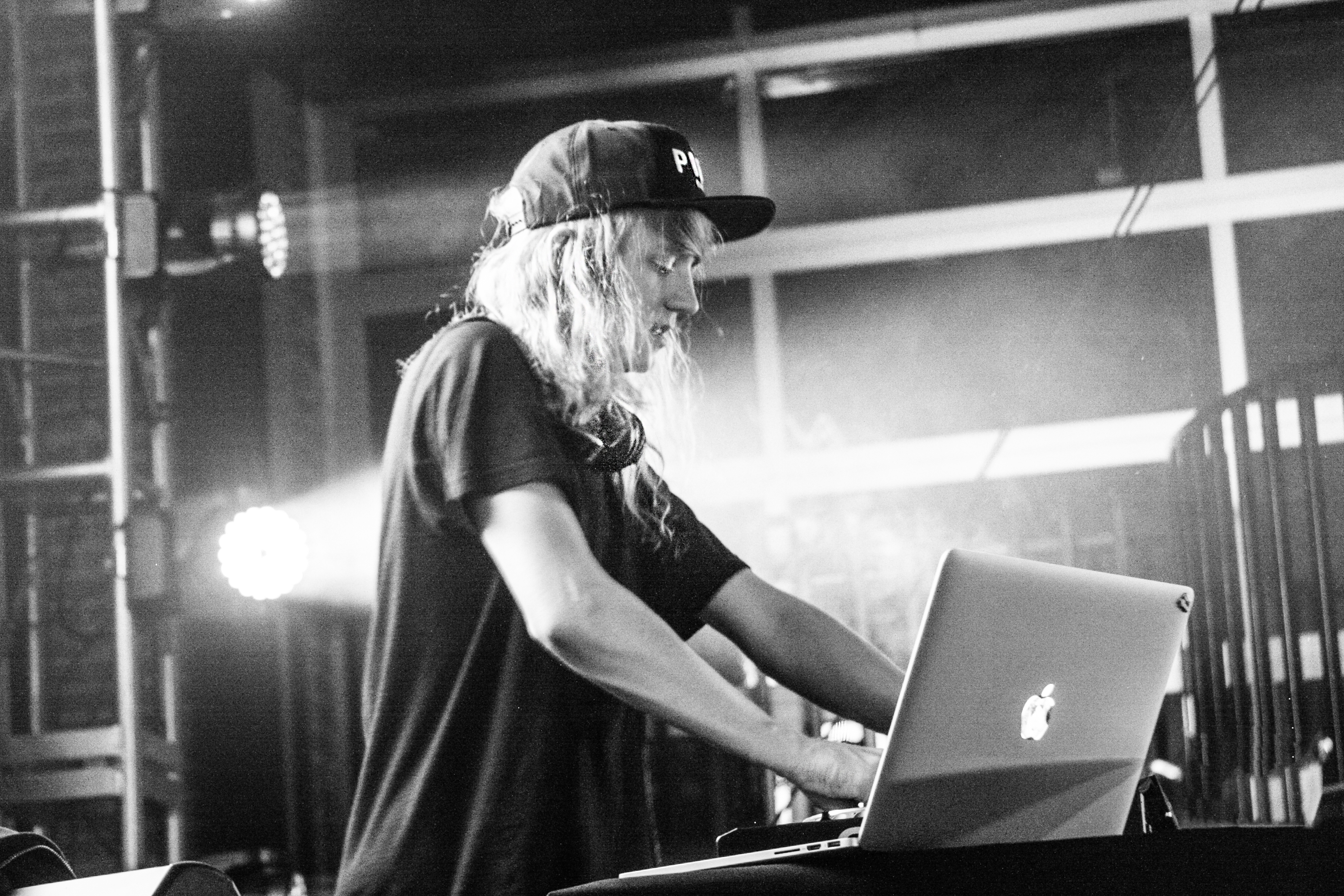
- Cashmere Cat in 2014

Background information
- Also known as: DJ Final; Fellepus
- Born: Magnus August Høiberg; 29 November 1987 (age 38); Halden, Norway
- Genres: R&B; alternative R&B; electronic; future bass; hip hop; dancehall
- Occupations: Disc jockey; record producer; music programmer; songwriter
- Years active: 2006–present
- Labels: Pelican Fly; LuckyMe; Friends Keep Secrets; Mad Love; Interscope
- Website: cashmerecat.com

Magnus August Høiberg (born 29 November 1987), known professionally as Cashmere Cat, is a Norwegian DJ and record producer. Often in tandem with Benny Blanco, he has been credited with production work for artists including Kanye West, BTS, Snoop Dogg, the Kid Laroi, Selena Gomez, Camila Cabello, Ariana Grande, Tory Lanez, Major Lazer, the Weeknd, Kali Uchis and Lil Uzi Vert. His debut studio album, 9 (2017), was released by Blanco's Mad Love Records, an imprint of Interscope Records and peaked at number 14 on the VG-lista charts. It also entered the Billboard 200 and included the single "Adore" (featuring Ariana Grande), which marked his only entry on the US Billboard Hot 100 as a lead artist.

His debut extended play (EP), Mirror Maru (2012) was met with widespread critical praise. His second album, Princess Catgirl (2019) followed thereafter and experimented with hyperpop.

== Career ==
=== 2006–2015: Early years, Mirror Maru and Wedding Bells ===
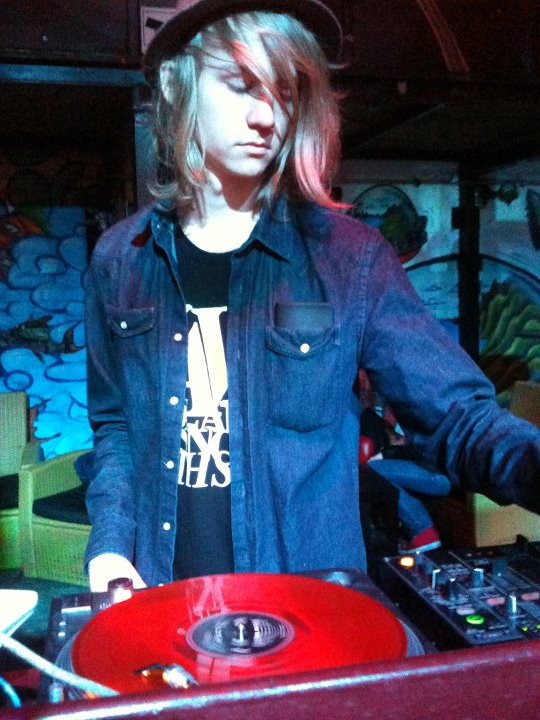
Cashmere Cat in 2012

As a teenager, Høiberg began producing music and teaching himself how to DJ. He represented Norway in the DMC World DJ Championships from 2006 to 2009 under the pseudonym DJ Final.

Høiberg's debut extended play (EP) as Cashmere Cat, Mirror Maru, was released on 22 October 2012 on French label Pelican Fly. The diversity and influence of multiple genres gained support from notables such as Hudson Mohawke, Rustie and Gilles Peterson.

He continued to gain recognition with a number of remixes, including his edits of 2 Chainz' "No Lie," Lana Del Rey's "National Anthem," Miguel's "Do You..." and Jeremih's "773 Love." In January 2013, producer, songwriter and musician Benny Blanco invited Cashmere to New York to collaborate on production work and helped book his first. In 2013 Cashmere Cat also played his first concerts in the United States. That summer, he moved from Norway to Manhattan.

On 11 February 2014, Høiberg's second EP Wedding Bells was released on UK label LuckyMe. In August same year, he produced and featured on "Be My Baby" from Ariana Grande's second studio album My Everything. He was also the opening act during Grande's North American The Honeymoon Tour. On September 26, 2014, Jeremih released promotional single "Nobody But U" produced by Cashmere Cat, but it did not make his oft-delayed and hotly-anticipated Late Nights: The Album.

=== 2016–present: 9, Princess Catgirl, other contributions ===
On 28 February 2016, Cashmere confirmed that his debut studio album, 9, was on the way. Ahead of the album, Cashmere Cat release singles "Wild Love" featuring The Weeknd and Francis and the Lights; "Trust Nobody" featuring Selena Gomez and Tory Lanez; "Love Incredible" featuring Camila Cabello and co-produced by Sophie; and "9 (After Coachella)" featuring MØ and Sophie. The album was released on 28 April 2017 with further contributions from Kehlani, Kacy Hill, Ariana Grande, Ty Dolla Sign and Jhené Aiko.

Cashmere co-produced "Wolves", alongside Sinjin Hawke, for Kanye West's 2016 studio album The Life of Pablo.

In 2018, Cashmere Cat co-produced album tracks for Kanye West (Kids See Ghosts) and Nas. He continued to produce for a number of artists, with notable credits on Benny Blanco's debut single, the global hit "Eastside" with Halsey and Khalid and Shawn Mendes and Camila Cabello's global hit "Señorita".

Cashmere Cat's second album, Princess Catgirl, was released on September 20, 2019, featuring singles "Emotions" and "For Your Eyes Only."

Cashmere Cat co-wrote and co-produced The Kid Laroi's 2021 song "Stay" (with Justin Bieber), which went on to reach number one on the Billboard Hot 100 in August 2021.

In 2024, Cashmere Cat served as a songwriter, producer and executive producer for Lil Uzi Vert's album Eternal Atake 2.

In 2025, Cashmere Cat served as a songwriter and producer on some songs from benny blanco and Selena Gomez's album I Said I Love You First. He also wrote and produced "Nachica", "906090", and "Perro Fiel" from Neton Vega's album DELIRIUM.

== Discography ==
- 9 (2017)
- Princess Catgirl (2019)

== Awards and nominations ==
Year	Organization	Award	Work	Result	Ref.
2016	Grammy Award	Best R&B Song	Tory Lanez: 'LUV'	Nominated	—N/a
2017	Spellemannprisen '16	Producer of the Year	Cashmere Cat	Won	—N/a
2017	Spellemann & Music Norway	Eksportprisen '16	Cashmere Cat	Nominated	
2017	Electronic Music Awards	Album of the Year	9	Nominated	
2017	Electronic Music Awards	Producer of the Year	Cashmere Cat	Won	
2017	TONO	EDVARD-prisen 2017	Cashmere Cat	Won	
2018	Spellemannprisen '17	Album of the Year	9	Nominated	
2018	Spellemannprisen '17	Pop solo act	9	Won	
2018	Spellemannprisen '17	Producer of the Year	Cashmere Cat	Nominated	
2019	Spellemannprisen '18	International Success of the Year	Cashmere Cat	Nominated	—N/a
2020	Spellemannprisen '19	Producer of the Year	Cashmere Cat	Nominated	—N/a
2020	Musikkforleggerprisen	Artistic work of the year	FKA Twigs: «sad day»	Nominated	
2025	Grammy Nomination	Best Dance Pop Recording	"Bluest Flame" benny blanco & Selena Gomez	Nominated	
2026	iHeart Radio Music Awards	Latin Pop / Urban Song of The Year	benny blanco "DEGENERE"	Nominated	

Awards
Preceded by -	Recipient of the producer Spellemannprisen; 2016/2017	Succeeded by -
Preceded by Aurora	Recipient of the pop artist Spellemannprisen; 2017	Succeeded by -
