= MCVertt =

American record producer

- Born: Mohamed Camara; June 18, 2003 (age 23); Newark, New Jersey, U.S.
- Genres: Hip hop; Jersey club
- Occupations: Record producer; songwriter
- Years active: 2010s–present
- Member of: Project X

Mohamed Camara, known professionally as MCVertt (m-c vertt; born June 18, 2003), is an American record producer and songwriter from Newark, New Jersey. He is best known for his production on Lil Uzi Vert's 2022 single "Just Wanna Rock", which entered the top ten of the US Billboard Hot 100. He is recognized for his producer tags "MC, make another hit!" and "Project X".

Since 2021, he has worked extensively with artists such as Sugarhill Ddot, BBG Steppaa, Sexyy Red, IShowSpeed, and A$AP Ferg.

== Early life ==
Camara was born in Jersey City, New Jersey. Camara first began making beats using FL Studio where he would post his tracks onto SoundCloud.

== Career ==
Camara first posted beats to his SoundCloud along with his friend Babyboy SBB, where they would gain tens of thousands of plays. He later started posting them onto YouTube.

In March 2021, rapper Bandmanrill would release his breakout single "Heartbroken", which was produced by Camara. They would then work on various songs such as "I Am Newark", "Bullet", and "Bandthoven".

In November 2021, Camara produced the song "Shake" by YouTuber IShowSpeed, which became a viral hit. IShowSpeed would also name drop Camara on the song, as one of the songs' few intelligible lyrics. This attracted the attention of Lil Uzi Vert, and Camara subsequently worked with the artist to produce their 2022 single, "Just Wanna Rock". The song peaked at number ten on the Billboard Hot 100, reaching Camara's furthest commercial success. Camara also debuted as a recording artist, producing his own material, beginning with his single "Dancing Ass Nigga" in March of that year. In July 2023, he released a follow-up single "Face Down" featuring ASAP Ferg and Sexyy Red. He was signed by Steven "Steve-O" Carless to Warner Records. Since then, he has worked on projects with artists such as Sugarhill Ddot, BBG Steppaa, and B-Lovee.

== Discography ==
=== Singles ===
List of singles as lead artist, with showing year released and album name
Title	Year	Album
"Dancing Ass Nigga"	2021	Non-album single
"Twindrive" (featuring BBG Steppaa, Fo Guala and Dusav)	2023	Non-album single
"Face Down" (with Sexyy Red and A$AP Ferg)	2023	Defiant Presents: Jiggy in Jersey

== Production discography ==
=== Charted singles ===
List of singles, with showing year released, peak chart positions and album name
Title	Year	Peak chart positions							Certifications	Album
Title	Year	US	US R&B/HH	US Rap	AUS	CAN	NZ	UK	Certifications	Album
Shake" (IShowSpeed)	2021	–	–	–	–	–	–	–	-	Non-album single
"Just Wanna Rock" (Lil Uzi Vert)	2022	10	5	1	39	20	36	30	RIAA: 2× Platinum; ARIA: Platinum; BPI: Silver; MC: 2× Platinum	Pink Tape
"Bent" (41, Kyle Richh and Jenn Carter featuring Tata)	2023	— (Note: "Bent" did not enter the Billboard Hot 100, but peaked at number 14 on the Bubbling Under Hot 100 Singles chart.)	37	–	–	–	–	–	RIAA: Gold	41 World: Not the Album
''What You Saying'' (Lil Uzi Vert)	2025	12								
