= Princess Catgirl =

Studio album by Cashmere Cat
- Released: 20 September 2019
- Recorded: 2019
- Genre: Hyperpop, electronic
- Length: 18:34
- Label: Interscope; Mad Love
- Producer: Cashmere Cat (also exec.); Benny Blanco (also exec.); Toby Scott; Paul Harris; Francis and the Lights; Matt Miller; Airynore; SOPHIE; Elof Loelv; John Cunningham

Cashmere Cat chronology
9 (2017)	Princess Catgirl (2019)

Singles from Princess Catgirl
- 1. "Emotions" Released: 9 August 2019; 2. "For Your Eyes Only" Released: 6 September 2019

Professional ratings
Review scores
Source	Rating
Pitchfork	6.8/10

Princess Catgirl (stylized in all caps) is the second studio album by Norwegian electronic musician Cashmere Cat. It was released on 20 September 2019 through Interscope, succeeding his commercially successful debut album 9.

== Background ==
Cashmere Cat expressed that the album relies less on credited guest vocalists and more on himself as a musician. In interviews, he has cited Princess Catgirl as a persona and the public face of his music. "She's very cute and powerful. I've always been shy—since the beginning of being an artist I would hide my face, not want to do interviews, hide behind other artists. I guess you could say I was scared. So I created Princess Catgirl to be the face of my music. She makes me feel safe."

== Track listing ==
No.	Title	Writer(s)	Producer(s)	Length
1.	"For Your Eyes Only"	Magnus August Høiberg; Benjamin Levin; Francis Farewell Starlite; Tye Morgan; Toby Scott; Paul Harris; Christopher Ramos	Cashmere Cat; Benny Blanco; Scott; Harris; Francis and the Lights^{[b]}	3:08
2.	"Watergirl"	Høiberg; Levin; Kevin Esmenda; Jessica Porfiri; Matthew Miller; Shelly Peiken; Guy Roche	Cashmere Cat; Blanco; Miller; Airynore	2:58
3.	"Back for You"	Høiberg; Levin; Sophie Xeon; Daystar Peterson	Cashmere Cat; Blanco; Sophie	2:30
4.	"Emotions"	Høiberg; Levin; Tove Styrke; Elof Loelv; Stephen Wilkinson	Cashmere Cat; Blanco; Loelv	2:53
5.	"Moo"	Høiberg; Levin; Jahseh Onfroy; John Cunningham	Cashmere Cat; Blanco; Cunningham	1:33
6.	"Without You"	Høiberg; Levin; Sarah Aarons; Esmenda; Julia Michaels; Justin Tranter; Mattias Larsson; Robin Fredriksson; Oscar Holter	Cashmere Cat; Blanco; Airynore	3:24
7.	"Princess Catgirl"	Høiberg	Cashmere Cat	2:08
Total length:				18:34

Notes

- ^{^[b]} signifies an additional producer.
- All track titles are stylized in all caps.
- "Watergirl" samples the song "What a Girl Wants" originally performed by Christina Aguilera.
- "Back for You" features vocals performed by Tory Lanez.
- "Moo" samples the song "Moonlight" originally performed by XXXTentacion.
- "Without You" samples the song "Love Myself" originally performed by Hailee Steinfeld.

== Charts ==
Chart (2019)	Peak position
US Dance/Electronic Album Sales (Billboard)	12
