= Mirror Maru =

EP by Cashmere Cat
- Released: 22 October 2012
- Genres: EDM; bass music
- Length: 15:43
- Label: Pelican Fly
- Producer: Magnus August Høiberg

Cashmere Cat chronology
Mirror Maru (2012)	Mirror Maru Remixes (2013)

Mirror Maru is the debut extended play (EP) by Norwegian DJ and record producer Cashmere Cat, released on 22 October 2012 by Pelican Fly.

== Recording and production ==
For his EP, the Norwegian producer employs a wide array of drum machines and unconventional sound effects, including autotuned bedsprings, in order to craft a background for melody.

== Composition ==
On his debut EP Mirror Maru, Cashmere Cat blends a technical sensibility with pop playfulness. It consists of four tracks that feature warm, colorful EDM steeped in R&B leanings while backed by methodical drum samples. Mirror Maru demonstrates Cat's skillfulness with a soft-touch approach to bass music. The EP contains sparse, forlorn pianos and throbbing, mechanically jointed percussive elements that are not very rough-edged or aggressive, and convey blissed-out feelings.

== Critical reception ==
Professional ratings
Review scores
Source	Rating
Pitchfork	7.6/10

Jonah Bromwich of Pitchfork gave the album a positive review, stating, "Mirror Maru consists of four tracks of colorful, warm EDM suffused with R&B leanings and backed by regimented drum samples. And though it's only 15 minutes long, the EP manages to communicate a fully realized artistic persona, one that finds the beating heart underneath all that scratched vinyl." He concludes, "It's clear Høiberg has experience catering to two very different types of audiences. On Mirror Maru, he takes what he's learned and creates something that's sure to unite the entire congregation."

== Track listing ==
All tracks are written by Magnus August Høiberg.

No.	Title	Length
1.	"Mirror Maru"	4:02
2.	"Secrets + Lies"	3:39
3.	"Kiss Kiss"	3:42
4.	"Paws"	4:22
Total length:		15:43
