= Sinjin Hawke =

- Born: Alan Stanley Soucy Brinsmead
- Genres: Electronic; hip hop
- Occupations: Producer; DJ
- Years active: 2011–present
- Labels: Fractal Fantasy; Planet Mu; Pelican Fly

Alan Stanley Soucy Brinsmead, better known by the stage name Sinjin Hawke, is a Canadian-American electronic music producer and DJ.

== Career ==
In late 2011, Sinjin Hawke released his first EP, "The Lights" on the Belgium-based Pelican Fly label and followed it up with tours throughout Europe, North America, and Asia. For this he developed a live hardware performance, which was later broadcast by Boiler Room in Los Angeles.

In mid-2012, he released "Prom Nite" on Pelican Fly and followed that up with a series of remixes for DJ Assault and DJ Funk on Membrane and Booty Call Records respectively.

In 2013, he participated in the New York City instalment of the Red Bull Music Academy, where he collaborated with rap producer Just Blaze on a song called "One". This came shortly after Sinjin released "Yea Hoe" with Gangsta Boo.

In 2014, Sinjin Hawke and Zora Jones established Fractal Fantasy, christening it with a series of computer graphic driven audio-visual pieces. These first pieces featured musical collaborations between them, and MikeQ, Morri$, DJ Taye and L-Vis 1990.

In February 2015, it was revealed that "Wolves", from Kanye West's album The Life of Pablo, was produced by Sinjin Hawke and Cashmere Cat. The song also features Sia and Vic Mensa.

=== First Opus ===
His debut studio album, First Opus, was released on May 10, 2017, via Fractal Fantasy – accompanied by a visual experience that let users interact with different climatic environments via the website.

=== Live AV ===
Sinjin and Zora Jones toured the album throughout 2018 and 2019, for this they developed a live audio-visual set which was premiered at Sonar Festival in Barcelona. The set received acclaim for its innovative use of motion capture technology.

== Personal life ==
Hawke was born in New Jersey. His father, Duncan Brinsmead, is a French horn player and computer graphics programmer, and his mother a university administrator.

== Discography ==
=== Albums/EPs ===
- Sinjin Hawke "First Opus" – 2017 (Fractal Fantasy)
- Sinjin Hawke "Prom Nite" – 2013 (Pelican Fly)
- Sinjin Hawke "The Lights" EP – 2011 (Pelican Fly)

=== Productions ===
- Ian Isiah – Bedroom – 2019
- Ian Isiah – Killup – 2019
- Ian Isiah – 24/7 – 2019
- Ian Isiah – Bleach Report – 2019
- Kanye West – "Wolves" – 2016 (GOOD Music)
- Kanye West ft. Frank Ocean – "Frank's Track" – 2016 (GOOD Music)
- Ian Isiah – 10K – 2016
- Sicko Mobb – "How We Rock" – 2015 (Fake Shore Drive)
- Ian Isiah – "Private Party" – 2014 (UNO Records)

=== Executive productions ===
- Xzavier Stone – THIRST (2018 – Fractal Fantasy)
- Martyn Bootyspoon – Silk Eternity EP (2018 – Fractal Fantasy)
- VA – Visceral Minds 2 (2017 – Fractal Fantasy)
- VA – Visceral Minds (2014 – Fractal Fantasy)
- Zora Jones – 100 Ladies EP (2014 – Fractal Fantasy)
- Nadus – Broke City EP (2013 – Pelican Fly)

=== Collaborations ===
- Sinjin Hawke, La Zowi, Ian Isiah & Zora Jones "Fulana" – 2020 (Élite)
- Sinjin Hawke, La Zowi, Jam City & Zora Jones "Phonecall" – 2020 (Élite)
- Sinjin Hawke, DJ Rashad & DJ Spinn "Monterrey" – 2017 (Fractal Fantasy)
- Sinjin Hawke, Scratcha DVA, Killa P & Zora Jones "Bussgun" – 2017 (Fractal Fantasy)
- Sinjin Hawke, Canblaster & Zora Jones "Speedlight" – 2017 (Fractal Fantasy)
- Sinjin Hawke & DJ Sliink "Raw" – 2017 (Fractal Fantasy)
- Sinjin Hawke, Swing Ting & Trigga "Killa Season" – 2017 (Fractal Fantasy)
- Sinjin Hawke & L-Vis 1990 "Vision" – 2017 (Fractal Fantasy)
- Sinjin Hawke, Richelle & Xzavier Stone "All Black" – 2017 (Fractal Fantasy)
- Sinjin Hawke, Famous Eno, Trigganom, Serocee & Zora Jones "Gunshotta" – 2017 (Fractal Fantasy)
- Sinjin Hawke & Zora Jones "No Shame" – 2017 (Fractal Fantasy)
- Sinjin Hawke, Heavee & Zora Jones "Loud" – 2017 (Fractal Fantasy)
- Sinjin Hawke & DVA [Hi:Emotions] "DAFUQ" – 2016 (Hyperdub)
- Sinjin Hawke & Just Blaze "One" – 2014 (RBMA)
- Sinjin Hawke & MikeQ "Thunderscan" – 2014 (Fractal Fantasy)
- Sinjin Hawke & L-Vis 1990 "The Pit" – 2014 (Sound Pellegrino)
- Sinjin Hawke & L-Vis 1990 "Flash Alert" – 2014 (Fractal Fantasy)
- Sinjin Hawke & Gangsta Boo "Yea Hoe" – 2013 (RBMA)
- Sinjin Hawke & Morri$ "Ferrofluid" – 2013 (Fractal Fantasy)
- Sinjin Hawke & Zora Jones "VClipse" – 2013 (Fractal Fantasy)
- Sinjin Hawke & DJ Sliink "Gas Pump" – 2011 (Self Release)
- Sinjin Hawke & Morri$ "One Kiss" – 2011 (Self Release)
- Sinjin Hawke & DJ Lag "Raptor" – 2021

=== Official remixes ===
- Scratcha DVA – Worst [Sinjin Hawke Remix]" – 2016 (Hyperdub Records)
- Ludacris "Party Girls (ft. Jeremih, Wiz Khalifa, Cashmere Cat) [Sinjin Hawke Remix]" – 2015 (Def Jam)
- Dre Skull "First Time (ft. Popcaan) [Sinjin Hawke Remix]" – 2013 (Mixpak Records)
- DJ Funk "Three Fine Hoes (Sinjin Hawke Remix)" – 2013 (Booty Call Records)
- DJ Assault & Socalled "Sleepover (Sinjin Hawke Remix)" – 2013 (Membran)
- Lunice, Prison Garde & Ango – "Drama (Sinjin Hawke & Canblaster Remix)" – 2012 (RBMA)
- Boylan Teklife – "Hi Light (Sinjin Hawke Remix)" – 2011 (Moveltraxx)
