= Pink Tape (Lil Uzi Vert album) =

2023 album by Lil Uzi Vert

Studio album by Lil Uzi Vert
- Released: June 30, 2023
- Recorded: 2017, 2020–2023
- Genres: Hip hop; trap; rage; punk rap; rap rock; alternative hip hop
- Length: 87:03
- Labels: GN; Atlantic
- Producers: 1wakeupp; 206Derek; Arca; Ben Thomas; Bnyx; Bobby Raps; Brandon Finessin; Breezey Muzik; Bring Me the Horizon; Bugz Ronin; Charlie Handsome; Clif Shayne; Cubeatz; Daron Malakian; Deckard3000; Don Cannon; Duce; Evil Twin; Forthenight; Forza; Halfway; Harold Harper; Ike Beatz; ISOBeats; J-Law; Jkari; John Ross; Kado; Ken Carson; Kobametal; KrishnaMusic; Landers; Leqn; Lyle LeDuff; Matty Spats; MCVertt; Oogie Mane; Outtatown; Pitt Tha Kid; Qqqu1ncy; Quincy Riley; Rick Rubin; Sense1god; Serj Tankian; Sixthursdays; Snow Strippers; Star Boy; Swvsh; Synthetic; Tommy Parker; TP13; Wheezy; WondaGurl; Yugen; ZeeGoinXrazy; Zkup

Lil Uzi Vert chronology
Red & White (2022)	Pink Tape (2023)	Eternal Atake 2 (2024)

Singles from Pink Tape
- 1. "Just Wanna Rock" Released: October 17, 2022; 2. "Endless Fashion" Released: August 18, 2023

Pink Tape is the third solo studio album by American rapper and singer Lil Uzi Vert. It was released through Generation Now and Atlantic Records on June 30, 2023. The album features guest appearances from Travis Scott, Nicki Minaj, Snow Strippers, Bring Me the Horizon, Don Toliver, and Babymetal. Production was handled by a variety of record producers, including Bring Me the Horizon themselves, Don Cannon, Brandon Finessin, Arca, Bnyx, Oogie Mane, Cubeatz, WondaGurl, Bugz Ronin, Ken Carson, Bobby Raps, Rick Rubin, Serj Tankian, Daron Malakian, Kobametal, Wheezy, and Charlie Handsome, among others. The album serves as a successor to their third extended play Red & White (2022), which released a year earlier.

The album was supported by two singles, "Just Wanna Rock" and "Endless Fashion" featuring Nicki Minaj. It features elements of alternative hip hop, punk rap, rage, rap metal, and metalcore. Pink Tape debuted at number one on the Billboard 200 chart, opening with 167,000 album-equivalent units consisting of 11,000 album sales and 154,000 streaming units.

== Background and release ==
The album was first teased by Uzi in December 2020, (later revealed to be the songs "Pluto to Mars" and "I Gotta") during a two-hour-long Instagram Live in which they previewed unreleased music and revealed they would be dropping a mixtape exclusively on SoundCloud. Uzi announced the album's title in an Instagram post on July 16, 2021. The title might be a reference to the $24 million pink diamond they had pierced into their forehead in February 2021. On October 9, 2021, while attending a friend's wedding, Uzi revealed to a fan that the tape would be released before Halloween. They later went back on those statements on October 22, explaining to some fans on the street:

No, it's not [dropping next week]. Then it drop next week, and then it sounds like shit, and I gotta hear from like one-hundred-thousand people on the Internet, "This sucks!" So you gotta let me take my time... I'm taking my time so it won't suck.

Months later, on December 2, 2021, Uzi appeared on a live stream with Kai Cenat in which they confirmed that the album would be completed the same night. Following the release of the lead and only single of the album, "Just Wanna Rock", on October 17, 2022, Uzi's manager, DJ Drama, suggested that the album is in its final stages while noting over 680 songs were considered for the album's tracklist. In June 2023, Uzi noted that the album would be released the same month. On June 17, Uzi had taken to Instagram to post an alternate cover art to the project. Through an Instagram live on June 18 with Cenat, Uzi shared updates regarding the rollout and tracklist of the album as they noted that the tracklist would include twenty-six songs consisting of "Just Wanna Rock", and two bonus songs which they described as:

special to me, that some people love that didn't really get to reach the day of light.

They also announced that the cover art would release in "a couple of days" and that the tracklist would release "this week," while confirming the release date of June 30. When asked by Kai about the features on the awaited album, Uzi stated:

Not that many features, but it's the features that everybody think I should have...where I started is where imma finish.

On June 26, 2023, Uzi revealed the cover art and the release date on their website and simultaneously released the Gibson Hazard directed trailer for the album to build anticipation leading up to it.

== Critical reception ==
Professional ratings
Aggregate scores
Source	Rating
Metacritic	64/100
Review scores
Source	Rating
AllMusic	3/5 stars
Clash	9/10
Financial Times	2/5 stars
HipHopDX	3.1/5
Pitchfork	5.7/10
Slant Magazine	3.5/5 stars

Pink Tape received generally positive reviews but polarized critics for its experimental sound. The review aggregator Metacritic assigned Pink Tape a weighted average score of 64, indicating "generally favorable" reviews, based on 5 critic reviews.

Robin Murray from Clash stated: "A work of quite stunning creativity, Pink Tape is well worth the wait. Long rumoured, frequently speculated upon, only their most dogged of fans would have expected such brilliance – this lengthy, thrill-a-minute release could well be their finest moment."

Clayton Purdom from Rolling Stone stated: "Their long-awaited Pink Tape finds an artist still relentlessly barreling forward, leaving everyone in the dust–including, quite possibly, many listeners. Pink Tape is a 26-track, 90-minute gauntlet in which Uzi's maximalism finds its fullest expression imaginable: galaxy-smashing rap-rock. Everything is as big as it can be. Uzi samples a WWE theme song by CFO$ at length, interpolates Eiffel 65's 'Blue', and covers System Of A Down's 'Chop Suey' pretty much verbatim. It's superhero theme music from an anime-worshiping genre apostate — an album of light-cycle chases and samurai clashes set to Def Leppard shredding."

Discussing the album, reviewers from Complex praised Pink Tape for its creativity and ambitious scope, but criticized the album as having inconsistent song quality as well as genre influences that were not combined cohesively.

Matthew Ritchie from Pitchfork stated: "At 26 tracks, Pink Tape is bloated and messy, with occasional flashes of excellence between grating screamo misfires and unremarkable songs that feel like retreads of Playboi Carti or Trippie Redd hits. It undermines Uzi's sterling record and acts as a cautionary tale about undiscerning genre adventures; instead of driving into exciting new terrain, it seems like they are just veering in the wrong direction."

== Commercial performance ==
In the United States, Pink Tape debuted at number one on the Billboard 200 chart, opening with 167,000 album-equivalent units consisting of 11,000 album sales and 154,000 streaming units (calculated from the 210.39 million on-demand streams the album's tracks received). It became Uzi's third number-one album in the country and the third-largest opening week of 2023 at the time. Pink Tape is the first hip hop album of 2023 to top the Billboard 200; marking the longest wait in a calendar year for a rap album to lead the chart since Cypress Hill's Black Sunday (1993). It also ended the chart's longest gap between number-one rap albums in almost 30 years, with Metro Boomin's Heroes & Villains (2022) being the last hip hop album to lead the chart prior to Pink Tape's debut. 18 of the album's 26 tracks debuted on the Billboard Hot 100, helping Uzi become the fourteenth artist in the chart's history to log 100 career entries on the survey.

== Track listing ==
Pink Tape track listing
No.	Title	Writer(s)	Producer(s)	Length
1.	"Flooded the Face"	Symere Woods; Donald Cannon; Harold Harper, Jr.; Robert Remming	Don Cannon; Harper	3:12
2.	"Suicide Doors"	Woods; Alejandra Ghersi Rodríguez; Brandon Veal; Leon Balint; Thant Tayzar	Arca; Brandon Finessin; Leqn; Yugen	4:19
3.	"Aye" (featuring Travis Scott)	Woods; Jacques Webster II; Benjamin Saint-Fort; Veal; Benjamin Thomas	Bnyx; Brandon Finessin; Ben Thomas	3:27
4.	"Crush Em"	Woods; Cannon; Ebony Oshunrinde; Tim Gomringer; Kevin Gomringer; Jordan Ortiz; Pepijn Baltus; Charles Ocansey	Don Cannon; WondaGurl; Cubeatz; Oogie Mane; Duce; Forthenight	2:45
5.	"Amped"	Woods; Daniel Perez; 1wakeupp; Jkari; Zachary Kupiec; Landers; TP13	Bugz Ronin; 1wakeupp; Jkari; Zkup; Landers; TP13	2:53
6.	"x2"	Woods; Kenyatta Frazier, Jr.; Clif Shayne	Ken Carson; Clif Shayne	3:54
7.	"Died and Came Back"	Woods; Veal; Balint; Sense1god	Brandon Finessin; Leqn; Sense1god	3:00
8.	"Spin Again"	Woods; Veal; Michael Rodrigues	Brandon Finessin; Swvsh	1:37
9.	"That Fiya"	Woods; Veal; ZeeGoinXrazy; Sixthursdays	Brandon Finessin; ZeeGoinXrazy; Sixthursdays	2:34
10.	"I Gotta"	Woods; Veal; Tobias Dekker; Anton Mendo	Brandon Finessin; Outtatown; Star Boy	2:53
11.	"Endless Fashion" (featuring Nicki Minaj)	Woods; Onika Maraj; D. Perez; Ivison Smith; Gianfranco Randone; Massimo Gabutti; Maurizio Lobina	Bugz Ronin; Ike Beatz	3:36
12.	"Mama, I'm Sorry"	Woods; D. Perez; Robert Richardson; Luiz Bonfá; Tyree Pittman; Keith Cozart; Wouter De Backer; Cameron Thomaz; Curtis Jackson III	Bugz Ronin; Bobby Raps	3:30
13.	"All Alone"	Woods; Cannon; Martin Pitt; Quincy Riley; Lyle LeDuff	Don Cannon; Pitt tha Kid; Riley; LeDuff	3:42
14.	"Nakamura"	Woods; Veal; LeDuff; Smith; Gregg Wattenberg; Michael Lauri; John Alicastro	Brandon Finessin; LeDuff; Ike Beatz	3:17
15.	"Just Wanna Rock"	Woods; Mohamed Camara; Javier Mercado	MCVertt; Synthetic	2:03
16.	"Fire Alarm" (featuring Snow Strippers)	Woods; Don Cannon; Graham Perez; Tatiana Schwaninger; Gaspard Augé; Xavier de Rosnay	Cannon; Snow Strippers	3:05
17.	"CS"	Woods; Frederick Rubin; Serj Tankian; Daron Malakian; Thomas	Rick Rubin; Serj Tankian; Daron Malakian; Thomas	3:32
18.	"Werewolf" (featuring Bring Me the Horizon)	Woods; Oliver Sykes; Matt Kean; Lee Malia; Matt Nicholls; Jordan Fish; Evil Twin	Bring Me the Horizon; Evil Twin	3:59
19.	"Pluto to Mars"	Woods; Veal; Deckard3000	Brandon Finessin; Deckard3000	4:06
20.	"Patience" (featuring Don Toliver)	Woods; Caleb Toliver; D. Perez; Thomas; Derek Anderson; Matthew Spatola	Bugz Ronin; Thomas; 206Derek; Matty Spats	4:22
21.	"Days Come and Go"	Woods; Cannon; Thomas Lumpkins	Don Cannon; Tommy Parker	4:17
22.	"Rehab"	Woods; Fousheé; Don Cannon; Veal; Roman Zakharov; Qqqu1ncy; D. Perez	Don Cannon; Brandon Finessin; Breezey Muzik; Qqqu1ncy; Bugz Ronin	4:05
23.	"The End" (featuring Babymetal)	Woods; Suzuka Nakamoto; Moa Kikuchi; Momoko Okazaki; Key Kobayashi; Daisuke Ehara	Kobametal	3:07
24.	"Zoom" (bonus track)	Woods; Wesley Glass; Ryan Vojtesak	Wheezy; Charlie Handsome	2:46
25.	"Of Course" (bonus track)	Woods; Ortiz; Amir Sanders; Brady Porter; Aidan Crotinger	Oogie Mane; Forza; Kado; Halfway	3:28
26.	"Shardai" (bonus track)	Woods; D. Perez; John Ross; Kyle Emordi; Smith	Bugz Ronin; John Ross; ISOBeats; Ike Beatz	3:21
Total length:				87:03

Notes

- "Rehab" features uncredited vocals by Fousheé

Sample credits

- "Nakamura" samples the song "The Rising Sun" by CFO$, which is the ring entrance theme of professional wrestler Shinsuke Nakamura for whom the song is named.
- "Crush Em" contains an interpolation of the song "Myron" by Lil Uzi Vert.
- "Endless Fashion" contains an interpolation of the song "Blue (Da Ba Dee)" by Eiffel 65.
- "Mama I'm Sorry" contains interpolations of "Somebody That I Used To Know", as performed by Gotye and Kimbra and "Hate Bein' Sober" by Chief Keef featuring 50 Cent and Wiz Khalifa.
- "Fire Alarm" contains a sample of the song "Stress" by Justice.
- "CS" is a cover of the song "Chop Suey!" by System of a Down.

== Charts ==
=== Weekly charts ===
Weekly chart performance for Pink Tape
Chart (2023)	Peak position
Australian Albums (ARIA)	7
Austrian Albums (Ö3 Austria)	4
Belgian Albums (Ultratop Flanders)	15
Belgian Albums (Ultratop Wallonia)	48
Canadian Albums (Billboard)	2
Czech Albums (ČNS IFPI)	2
Danish Albums (Hitlisten)	9
Dutch Albums (Album Top 100)	3
Finnish Albums (Suomen virallinen lista)	14
French Albums (SNEP)	34
German Albums (Offizielle Top 100)	13
Hungarian Albums (MAHASZ)	8
Irish Albums (Official Charts)	6
Italian Albums (FIMI)	19
Japanese Digital Albums (Oricon)	40
Japanese Download Albums (Billboard Japan)	35
Lithuanian Albums (AGATA)	5
New Zealand Albums (RMNZ)	1
Norwegian Albums (VG-lista)	3
Polish Albums (ZPAV)	6
Slovak Albums (ČNS IFPI)	2
Spanish Albums (Promusicae)	42
Swedish Albums (Sverigetopplistan)	41
Swiss Albums (Schweizer Hitparade)	3
UK Albums (Official Charts)	7
UK R&B Albums (Official Charts)	32
US Billboard 200	1
US Top R&B/Hip-Hop Albums (Billboard)	1

=== Year-end charts ===
2023 year-end chart performance for Pink Tape
Chart (2023)	Position
US Billboard 200	99
US Top R&B/Hip-Hop Albums (Billboard)	35

2024 year-end chart performance for Pink Tape
Chart (2024)	Position
US Top R&B/Hip-Hop Albums (Billboard)	84

== Certifications ==
Certifications for Pink Tape
Region	Certification	Certified units/sales
Canada (Music Canada)	Platinum	80,000^{‡}
United States (RIAA)	Platinum	1,000,000^{‡}
^{‡} Sales+streaming figures based on certification alone.

== Release history ==
Release dates and formats for Pink Tape
Region	Date	Format	Ref.
Various	June 30, 2023	Digital download; streaming	
Various	July 5, 2023	CD	
Various	October 20, 2023	LP record	
