= Billboard Year-End Hot R&B/Hip-Hop Songs of 2020 =

American music chart

This is a list of Billboard magazine's Top Hot R&B/Hip-Hop Songs of 2020.

No.	Title	Artist(s)
1	"Blinding Lights"	The Weeknd
2	"The Box"	Roddy Ricch
3	"Rockstar"	DaBaby featuring Roddy Ricch
4	"Life Is Good"	Future featuring Drake
5	"Whats Poppin" (remix)	Jack Harlow featuring DaBaby, Tory Lanez and Lil Wayne
6	"Roxanne"	Arizona Zervas
7	"Savage"	Megan Thee Stallion
8	"Say So"	Doja Cat
9	"Intentions"	Justin Bieber featuring Quavo
10	"WAP"	Cardi B featuring Megan Thee Stallion
11	"Heartless"	The Weeknd
12	"Toosie Slide"	Drake
13	"Blueberry Faygo"	Lil Mosey
14	"Bop"	DaBaby
15	"Go Crazy"	Chris Brown and Young Thug
16	"Good As Hell"	Lizzo
17	"Hot Girl Bummer"	Blackbear
18	"Falling"	Trevor Daniel
19	"Whoa"	Lil Baby
20	"Laugh Now Cry Later"	Drake featuring Lil Durk
21	"Ballin'"	Mustard featuring Roddy Ricch
22	"High Fashion"	Roddy Ricch featuring Mustard
23	"Highest in the Room"	Travis Scott
24	"For the Night"	Pop Smoke featuring Lil Baby and DaBaby
25	"Sum 2 Prove"	Lil Baby
26	"Heart on Ice"	Rod Wave
27	"We Paid"	Lil Baby and 42 Dugg
28	"Yummy"	Justin Bieber
29	"Godzilla"	Eminem featuring Juice Wrld
30	"Emotionally Scarred"	Lil Baby
31	"Bandit"	Juice Wrld and YoungBoy Never Broke Again
32	"Party Girl"	StaySolidRocky
33	"Suicidal"	YNW Melly featuring Juice Wrld
34	"Popstar"	DJ Khaled featuring Drake
35	"Hot"	Young Thug featuring Gunna
36	"The Bigger Picture"	Lil Baby
37	"The Woo"	Pop Smoke featuring 50 Cent and Roddy Ricch
38	"The Scotts"	The Scotts (Travis Scott and Kid Cudi)
39	"Dior"	Pop Smoke
40	"Mood Swings"	Pop Smoke featuring Lil Tjay
41	"Rags2Riches"	Rod Wave featuring ATR Son Son
42	"No Guidance"	Chris Brown featuring Drake
43	"Slide"	H.E.R. featuring YG
44	"Juicy"	Doja Cat and Tyga
45	"Wishing Well"	Juice Wrld
46	"Pussy Fairy (OTW)"	Jhené Aiko
47	"Best on Earth"	Russ featuring Bia
48	"Said Sum"	Moneybagg Yo
49	"Walk Em Down"	NLE Choppa featuring Roddy Ricch
50	"Out West"	JACKBOYS, Travis Scott and Young Thug
51	"Lemonade"	Internet Money, Gunna and Don Toliver featuring Nav
52	"Panini"	Lil Nas X
53	"Tap In"	Saweetie
54	"Girls in the Hood"	Megan Thee Stallion
55	"Like That"	Doja Cat featuring Gucci Mane
56	"Righteous"	Juice Wrld
57	"On Chill"	Wale featuring Jeremih
58	"Vibez"	DaBaby
59	"Futsal Shuffle 2020"	Lil Uzi Vert
60	"After Party"	Don Toliver
61	"Gooba"	6ix9ine
62	"Greece"	DJ Khaled featuring Drake
63	"Dollaz on My Head"	Gunna featuring Young Thug
64	"Playing Games"	Summer Walker
65	"Chicago Freestyle"	Drake and Giveon
66	"B.S."	Jhené Aiko featuring H.E.R.
67	"Baby"	Lil Baby and DaBaby
68	"Truth Hurts"	Lizzo
69	"Need It"	Migos featuring YoungBoy Never Broke Again
70	"3 Headed Goat"	Lil Durk featuring Lil Baby and Polo G
71	"Heat"	Chris Brown featuring Gunna
72	"Make No Sense"	YoungBoy Never Broke Again
73	"No Idea"	Don Toliver
74	"What You Know Bout Love"	Pop Smoke
75	"Believe It"	PartyNextDoor and Rihanna
76	"Camelot"	NLE Choppa
77	"Smile"	Juice Wrld and The Weeknd
78	"That Way"	Lil Uzi Vert
79	"Don't Rush"	Young T & Bugsey featuring Headie One
80	"Got It on Me"	Pop Smoke
81	"Come Thru"	Summer Walker and Usher
82	"24"	Money Man featuring Lil Baby
83	"Flex"	Polo G featuring Juice Wrld
84	"Jerry Sprunger"	Tory Lanez and T-Pain
85	"Easy"	DaniLeigh featuring Chris Brown
86	"Start wit Me"	Roddy Ricch featuring Gunna
87	"Franchise"	Travis Scott featuring Young Thug and M.I.A.
88	"Toes"	DaBaby featuring Lil Baby and Moneybagg Yo
89	"Girl of My Dreams"	Rod Wave
90	"Martin & Gina"	Polo G
91	"Turks"	Nav and Gunna featuring Travis Scott
92	"Do It"	Chloe x Halle
93	"Leave Em Alone"	Layton Greene and Lil Baby featuring City Girls and PnB Rock
94	"B.I.T.C.H."	Megan Thee Stallion
95	"Grace"	Lil Baby and 42 Dugg
96	"Kacey Talk"	YoungBoy Never Broke Again
97	"223's"	YNW Melly featuring 9lokkNine
98	"Hate the Other Side"	Juice Wrld and Marshmello featuring Polo G and The Kid Laroi
99	"Myron"	Lil Uzi Vert
100	"Enemies"	Post Malone featuring DaBaby

== See also ==
- 2020 in music
- Billboard Year-End Hot 100 singles of 2020
- Billboard Year-End Hot Rap Songs of 2020
- List of number-one R&B/hip-hop songs of 2020 (U.S.)
