= Billboard Year-End Hot Rap Songs of 2020 =

American music chart

This is a list of Billboard magazine's Top Hot Rap Songs of 2020.

| No. | Title | Artist(s) |
|---|---|---|
| 1 | "The Box" | Roddy Ricch |
| 2 | "Rockstar" | DaBaby featuring Roddy Ricch |
| 3 | "Life Is Good" | Future featuring Drake |
| 4 | "Roxanne" | Arizona Zervas |
| 5 | "Whats Poppin" | Jack Harlow |
| 6 | "Savage" | Megan Thee Stallion |
| 7 | "WAP" | Cardi B featuring Megan Thee Stallion |
| 8 | "Toosie Slide" | Drake |
| 9 | "Bop" | DaBaby |
| 10 | "Blueberry Faygo" | Lil Mosey |
| 11 | "Hot Girl Bummer" | Blackbear |
| 12 | "Falling" | Trevor Daniel |
| 13 | "Woah" | Lil Baby |
| 14 | "Laugh Now Cry Later" | Drake featuring Lil Durk |
| 15 | "Death Bed (Coffee for Your Head)" | Powfu featuring Beabadoobee |
| 16 | "Ballin'" | Mustard featuring Roddy Ricch |
| 17 | "Highest in the Room" | Travis Scott |
| 18 | "High Fashion" | Roddy Ricch featuring Mustard |
| 19 | "For the Night" | Pop Smoke featuring Lil Baby and DaBaby |
| 20 | "Mood" | 24kGoldn featuring Iann Dior |
| 21 | "Sum 2 Prove" | Lil Baby |
| 22 | "Heart on Ice" | Rod Wave |
| 23 | "We Paid" | Lil Baby and 42 Dugg |
| 24 | "Bandit" | Juice Wrld and YoungBoy Never Broke Again |
| 25 | "Popstar" | DJ Khaled featuring Drake |
| 26 | "Hot" | Young Thug featuring Gunna |
| 27 | "Party Girl" | StaySolidRocky |
| 28 | "The Woo" | Pop Smoke featuring 50 Cent and Roddy Ricch |
| 29 | "Suicidal" | YNW Melly featuring Juice Wrld |
| 30 | "The Bigger Picture" | Lil Baby |
| 31 | "Godzilla" | Eminem featuring Juice Wrld |
| 32 | "Mood Swings" | Pop Smoke featuring Lil Tjay |
| 33 | "Dior" | Pop Smoke |
| 34 | "Wishing Well" | Juice Wrld |
| 35 | "The Scotts" | The Scotts (Travis Scott and Kid Cudi) |
| 36 | "Emotionally Scarred" | Lil Baby |
| 37 | "Rags2Riches" | Rod Wave featuring ATR Son Son |
| 38 | "Lemonade" | Internet Money, Gunna and Don Toliver featuring Nav |
| 39 | "Panini" | Lil Nas X |
| 40 | "Said Sum" | Moneybagg Yo |
| 41 | "Walk Em Down" | NLE Choppa featuring Roddy Ricch |
| 42 | "Tap In" | Saweetie |
| 43 | "On Chill" | Wale featuring Jeremih |
| 44 | "Vibez" | DaBaby |
| 45 | "Girls in the Hood" | Megan Thee Stallion |
| 46 | "Futsal Shuffle 2020" | Lil Uzi Vert |
| 47 | "Out West" | JACKBOYS, Travis Scott and Young Thug |
| 48 | "Gooba" | 6ix9ine |
| 49 | "Best on Earth" | Russ featuring Bia |
| 50 | "Baby" | Lil Baby and DaBaby |

== See also ==
- 2020 in music
- Billboard Year-End Hot 100 singles of 2020
- Billboard Year-End Hot R&B/Hip-Hop Songs of 2020
