= Billboard Year-End Hot 100 singles of 2020 =

Ranking of recorded music

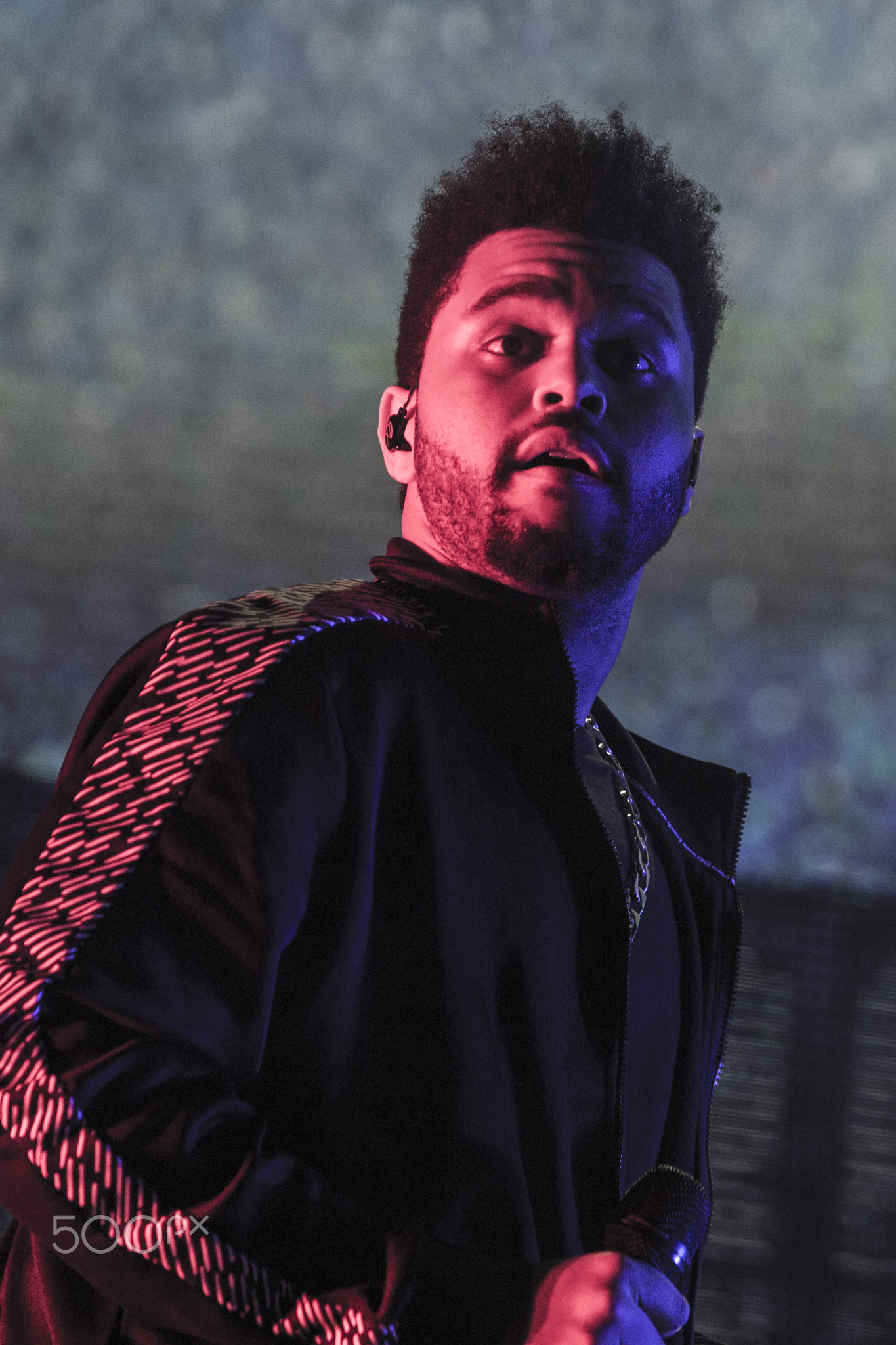
"Blinding Lights" by the Weeknd (pictured) was the best-performing single of 2020, spending a total of four nonconsecutive weeks at the top position of the Billboard Hot 100, as well as breaking Billboard records for both the most time ever spent in the Top 5, and the most spent in the Top 10.

The Billboard Hot 100 is a chart that ranks the best-performing singles of the United States. Its data, published by Billboard magazine and compiled by Nielsen SoundScan, is based collectively on each single's weekly physical and digital sales, as well as airplay and streaming. At the end of a year, Billboard will publish an annual list of the 100 most successful songs throughout that year on the Hot 100 chart based on the information. For 2020, the list was published on December 3, calculated with data from November 23, 2019, to November 14, 2020.

Billboard's top Hot 100 artist of 2020 was The Weeknd, whose "Blinding Lights" was the number-one Hot 100 song of the year. It was one of two songs he placed on the list.

== Year-end list ==
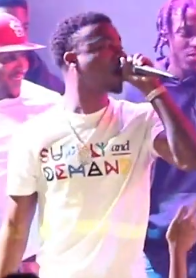
Roddy Ricch (pictured) has six songs on the Year-End list, tying Lil Baby for the most songs on the list. Four of these songs are in the top 40, with his two highest-ranking songs being the number-one songs "The Box" at number 3 and "Rockstar" (DaBaby featuring Roddy Ricch) at number 5.

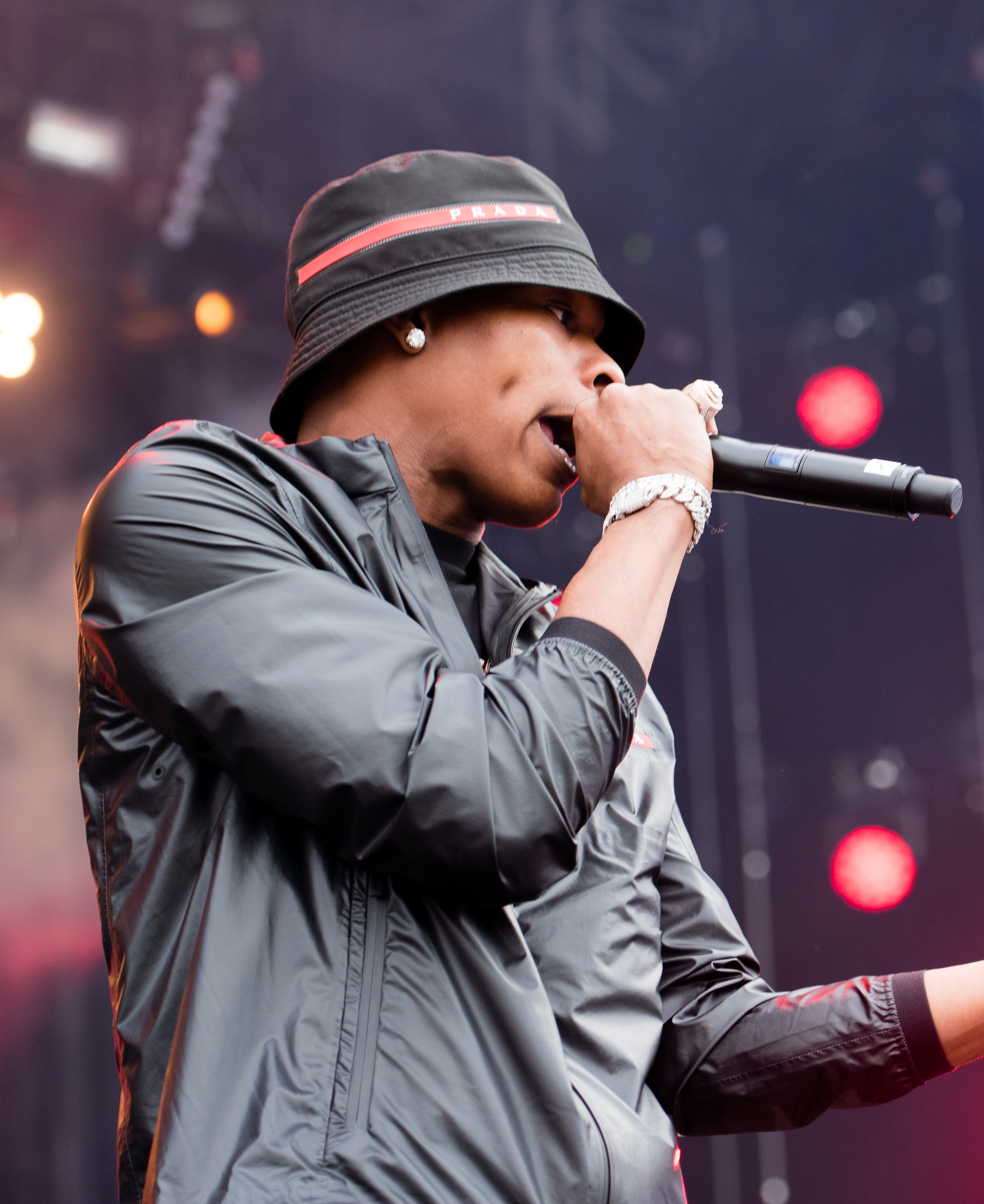
Lil Baby (pictured) ties Roddy Ricch for the most songs on the list with six. Three songs from his second studio album My Turn land on the list, with "Woah" at number 42, "Emotionally Scarred" at number 74, and "Sum 2 Prove" at number 79, in addition to two more from the album's deluxe edition, with "We Paid" (with 42 Dugg) at number 57 and "The Bigger Picture" at number 76. He additionally is featured on a version of "Rags2Riches"; however, that edition of the song was not listed.

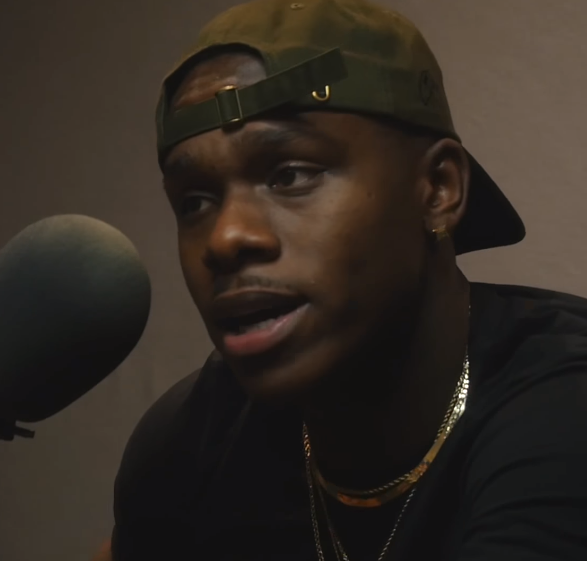
DaBaby (pictured) has five songs in the top 50, with his number-one song "Rockstar" (featuring Roddy Ricch) at number 5, "Whats Poppin" (Jack Harlow featuring DaBaby, Tory Lanez, and Lil Wayne) at number 13, "Bop" at number 29, "My Oh My" (Camila Cabello featuring DaBaby) at number 37, and "For the Night" (Pop Smoke featuring Lil Baby and DaBaby) at number 49.

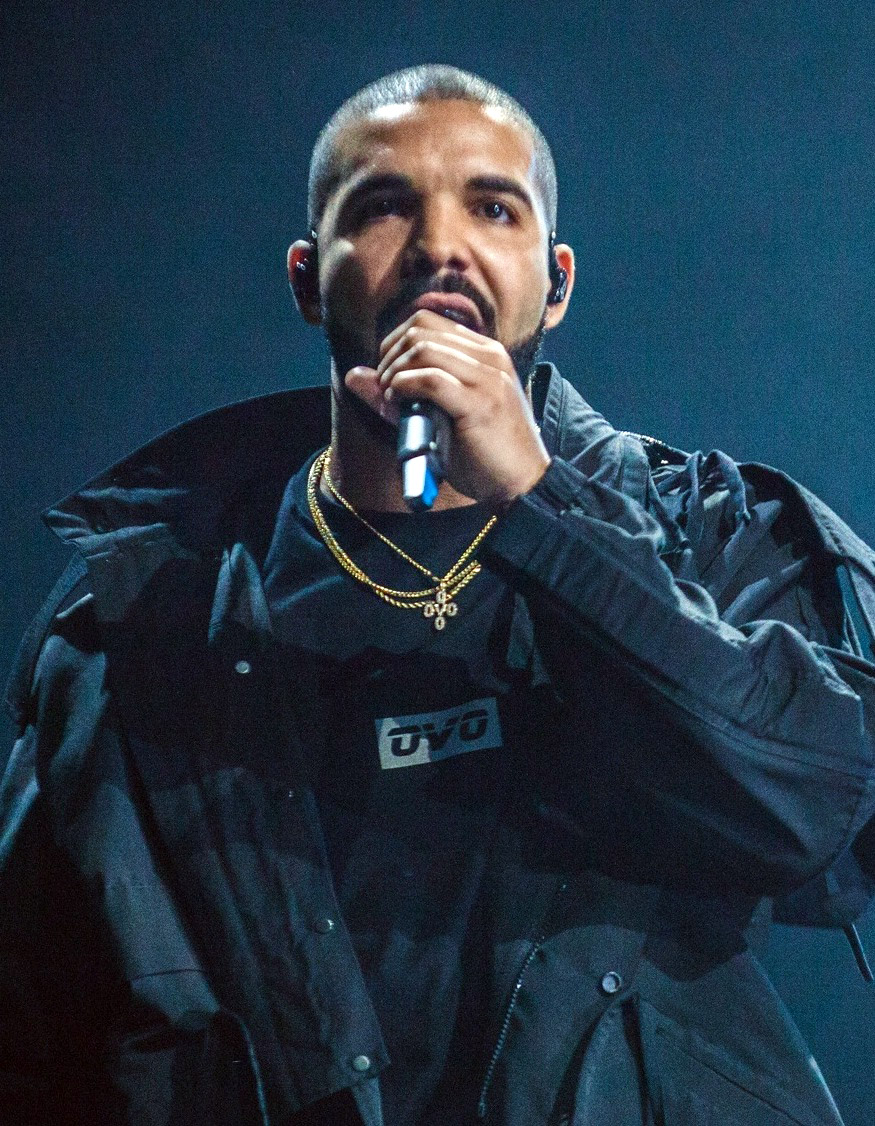
Drake (pictured) has five songs on the list, with his highest-ranking being a feature on "Life Is Good" by Future at number 7.

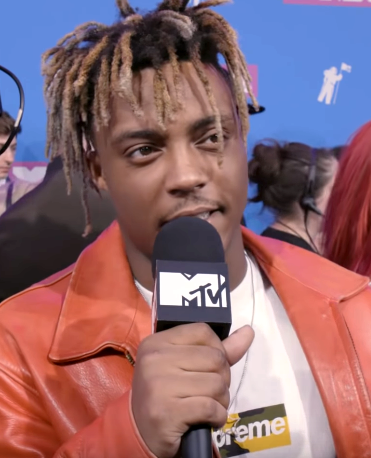
Juice Wrld (pictured) places five songs on the list, two of which are from his posthumously released third studio album Legends Never Die. Those two songs are "Come & Go" (with Marshmello) and "Wishing Well", which rank at number 54 and number 92 respectively.

List of songs on Billboard's 2020 Year-End Hot 100 chart
No.	Title	Artist(s)
1	"Blinding Lights"	The Weeknd
2	"Circles"	Post Malone
3	"The Box"	Roddy Ricch
4	"Don't Start Now"	Dua Lipa
5	"Rockstar"	DaBaby featuring Roddy Ricch
6	"Adore You"	Harry Styles
7	"Life Is Good"	Future featuring Drake
8	"Memories"	Maroon 5
9	"The Bones"	Maren Morris
10	"Someone You Loved"	Lewis Capaldi
11	"Say So"	Doja Cat
12	"I Hope"	Gabby Barrett featuring Charlie Puth
13	"Whats Poppin"	Jack Harlow featuring DaBaby, Tory Lanez and Lil Wayne
14	"Dance Monkey"	Tones and I
15	"Savage"	Megan Thee Stallion featuring Beyoncé
16	"Roxanne"	Arizona Zervas
17	"Intentions"	Justin Bieber featuring Quavo
18	"Everything I Wanted"	Billie Eilish
19	"Roses (Imanbek remix)"	Saint Jhn
20	"Watermelon Sugar"	Harry Styles
21	"Before You Go"	Lewis Capaldi
22	"Falling"	Trevor Daniel
23	"10,000 Hours"	Dan + Shay and Justin Bieber
24	"WAP"	Cardi B featuring Megan Thee Stallion
25	"Ballin'"	Mustard and Roddy Ricch
26	"Hot Girl Bummer"	Blackbear
27	"Blueberry Faygo"	Lil Mosey
28	"Heartless"	The Weeknd
29	"Bop"	DaBaby
30	"Lose You to Love Me"	Selena Gomez
31	"Good as Hell"	Lizzo
32	"Toosie Slide"	Drake
33	"Break My Heart"	Dua Lipa
34	"Chasin' You"	Morgan Wallen
35	"Savage Love (Laxed – Siren Beat)"	Jawsh 685 and Jason Derulo
36	"No Guidance"	Chris Brown featuring Drake
37	"My Oh My"	Camila Cabello featuring DaBaby
38	"Dynamite"	BTS
39	"Go Crazy"	Chris Brown and Young Thug
40	"High Fashion"	Roddy Ricch featuring Mustard
41	"Laugh Now Cry Later"	Drake featuring Lil Durk
42	"Woah"	Lil Baby
43	"Death Bed"	Powfu featuring Beabadoobee
44	"Señorita"	Shawn Mendes and Camila Cabello
45	"Highest in the Room"	Travis Scott
46	"Bad Guy"	Billie Eilish
47	"Mood"	24kGoldn featuring Iann Dior
48	"Rain on Me"	Lady Gaga and Ariana Grande
49	"For the Night"	Pop Smoke featuring Lil Baby and DaBaby
50	"Ritmo (Bad Boys for Life)"	Black Eyed Peas and J Balvin
51	"Heart on Ice"	Rod Wave
52	"Nobody but You"	Blake Shelton and Gwen Stefani
53	"Trampoline"	Shaed
54	"Come & Go"	Juice Wrld and Marshmello
55	"Truth Hurts"	Lizzo
56	"If the World Was Ending"	JP Saxe featuring Julia Michaels
57	"We Paid"	Lil Baby and 42 Dugg
58	"Yummy"	Justin Bieber
59	"One Man Band"	Old Dominion
60	"Got What I Got"	Jason Aldean
61	"Sunday Best"	Surfaces
62	"Godzilla"	Eminem featuring Juice Wrld
63	"Bandit"	Juice Wrld and YoungBoy Never Broke Again
64	"Party Girl"	StaySolidRocky
65	"Die from a Broken Heart"	Maddie & Tae
66	"Popstar"	DJ Khaled featuring Drake
67	"All I Want for Christmas Is You"	Mariah Carey
68	"One of Them Girls"	Lee Brice
69	"Hard to Forget"	Sam Hunt
70	"One Margarita"	Luke Bryan
71	"Panini"	Lil Nas X
72	"Hot"	Young Thug featuring Gunna
73	"I Hope You're Happy Now"	Carly Pearce and Lee Brice
74	"Emotionally Scarred"	Lil Baby
75	"Suicidal"	YNW Melly featuring Juice Wrld
76	"The Bigger Picture"	Lil Baby
77	"Only Human"	Jonas Brothers
78	"The Woo"	Pop Smoke featuring 50 Cent and Roddy Ricch
79	"Sum 2 Prove"	Lil Baby
80	"Stuck with U"	Ariana Grande and Justin Bieber
81	"Mood Swings"	Pop Smoke featuring Lil Tjay
82	"You Should Be Sad"	Halsey
83	"Dior"	Pop Smoke
84	"Supalonely"	Benee featuring Gus Dapperton
85	"Even Though I'm Leaving"	Luke Combs
86	"The Scotts"	The Scotts (Travis Scott and Kid Cudi)
87	"Juicy"	Doja Cat and Tyga
88	"Be Like That"	Kane Brown, Swae Lee and Khalid
89	"Homesick"	Kane Brown
90	"Rags2Riches"	Rod Wave featuring ATR Son Son
91	"Bluebird"	Miranda Lambert
92	"Wishing Well"	Juice Wrld
93	"Does to Me"	Luke Combs featuring Eric Church
94	"Pussy Fairy (OTW)"	Jhené Aiko
95	"ILY (I Love You Baby)"	Surf Mesa featuring Emilee
96	"More Than My Hometown"	Morgan Wallen
97	"Lovin' on You"	Luke Combs
98	"Said Sum"	Moneybagg Yo
99	"Slide"	H.E.R. featuring YG
100	"Walk Em Down"	NLE Choppa featuring Roddy Ricch

== See also ==
- 2020 in American music
- Billboard Year-End Hot R&B/Hip-Hop Songs of 2020
- Billboard Year-End Hot Rap Songs of 2020
- List of Billboard Hot 100 number ones of 2020
- List of Billboard Hot 100 top-ten singles in 2020
