= Blackout (mixtape) =

Mixtape by Money Man
- Released: October 28, 2022
- Genre: Hip hop; trap
- Length: 24:31
- Label: Black Circle; Empire
- Producer: AlekBeatz; AYL; Caerus; Cubeatz; Ebeasy; Ginseng; Juko; King Osama; Lala The DJ; LC; Luxury; MacShooter; Martin Sole; MoXart Beatz; Nile Wave; OJ Finessey; Omar Guetfa; PHIL; PopDatOli; ProdByLanden; Rafmade; Rjayy; ScOnTheTrack; Section 8; ShortyyK; Spacy; Staysolidtrey; Trademark; Trauma Tone; Yung Dee; Yung Lan

Money Man chronology
Big Money (2022)	Blackout (2022)	Red Eye (2023)

Blackout is a mixtape by American rapper Money Man. It was released on October 28, 2022, by Black Circle and Empire Distribution. The mixtape features a sole guest appearance from Juney Knotzz. The deluxe edition was released one month later on November 25, 2022. It features an additional guest appearance from BC Jroc. The mixtape also features production from many prestigious producers such as Yung Lan, Section 8, Cubeatz, Yung Dee, Trauma Tone and Lala The DJ, among others.

The mixtape received generally mixed reviews and debuted at number 168 on the Billboard 200 albums chart dated November 12, 2022. The mixtape is Money Man's third and final project of 2022.

== Critical reception ==
Professional ratings
Review scores
Source	Rating
AllMusic	2/5 stars

Blackout received generally mixed reviews from music critics. AllMusic commented that the song "Fareal", is the "only track that exceeds three minutes". The critic gave the mixtape a 2 out of 5 stars, stating that Money Man "makes his point and jets out, but nearly all of the songs sound identical, and his lyrics about money, sex, and drugs say nothing new". And the critic gave a negative review stating that the project was "boring, monotonus, and soulless".

Reviewing the mixtape from HotNewHipHop, Aron A. praised the project stating, "it's another excellent series of records from Money Man, who continues to show that he's one of consistent rappers out now". He also commented, "he holds down the project largely on his own. However, he does bring through some of his frequent collaborators".

== Commercial performance ==
In the United States on November 12, 2022, Blackout debuted at number 168 on the US Billboard 200 chart (Money Man's seventh entry on the chart overall) and opened at number 26 on the US Independent Albums chart in its first week of release.

== Track listing ==
Credits adapted from Spotify and Genius.

Blackout track listing
No.	Title	Writer(s)	Producer(s)	Length
1.	"Similar"	Tysen Bolding; Milan Modi; Oliver Spencer	Yung Lan; PopDatOli^{[a]}	1:52
2.	"Fareal" (featuring Juney Knotzz)	Bolding; Juney Knotzz; Darius Henry; ProdByLanden; Philipp Lindworsky	Yung Dee; ProdByLanden; Phil2K	3:14
3.	"Phenomenal"	Bolding; Modi	Yung Lan	1:59
4.	"Get Right"	Bolding; Modi	Yung Lan	2:08
5.	"Triad"	Bolding; Modi; Christian Lozano Delgado	Yung Lan; ScOnTheTrack^{[a]}	2:25
6.	"Maxed Out"	Bolding; Nicholas Berlinger; AYL; Gavin Valencia	MoXart Beatz; AYL; OJ Finessey	2:50
7.	"Run Up That Bag"	Bolding; Daniela Voznesensky; Osama Daou; Nile Bey	Lala the DJ; King Osama; Nile Wave	2:34
8.	"Stay Productive"	Bolding; Modi; Jacob Sclaver	Yung Lan; Juko	2:23
9.	"Get Active"	Bolding; Voznesensky; Daou; Igor Mankushev; Staysolidtrey	Lala the DJ; King Osama; Spacy; Staysolidtrey	2:10
10.	"Glamorous (Sinaloa)"	Bolding; Modi	Yung Lan	2:53
Total length:				24:31

Blackout: The Sequel - Deluxe edition (bonus tracks)
No.	Title	Writer(s)	Producer(s)	Length
11.	"Under Construction"	Bolding; Henry; Rondreze Hicks; Luke Clay	Yung Dee; Rjayy; LC	2:15
12.	"Boujee"	Bolding; Rai'Shaun Williams	Section 8	2:18
13.	"Only Bad Vibes Allowed"	Bolding; Williams; Omar-Rayan Guetfa; Martin Sole	Section 8; Omar Guetfa; Sole	2:14
14.	"Spin For You"	Bolding; Williams; Tim Gomringer; Kevin Gomringer	Section 8; Cubeatz	2:18
15.	"Intense" (featuring Juney Knotzz)	Bolding; Juney Knotzz; Modi; Sclaver	Yung Lan; Juko	2:44
16.	"Adrenaline"	Bolding; Addison Rineer; Christian Baello; John Carrington Jr.	Rafmade; Ginseng; Trauma Tone^{[a]}	2:11
17.	"Coming In" (featuring BC Jroc)	Bolding; BC Jroc; Modi; Spencer	Yung Lan; PopDatOli^{[a]}	2:38
18.	"On A Streak"	Bolding; Voznesensky; AlekBeatz; Caerus; Ebeasy	Lala the DJ; AlekBeatz; Caerus; Ebeasy	2:12
19.	"Gymnast"	Bolding; Voznesensky; Daou; Sclaver; Maximilian McFarlin	Lala the DJ; King Osama; Juko; MacShooter	2:23
20.	"Armed & Dangerous"	Bolding; Tyler Maline; Moritz Busch; Luis Gärdes	Trademark; ShortyyK; Luxury	1:57
Total length:				47:47

=== Notes ===
- ^{^[a]} signifies a co-producer

== Personnel ==
Credits were adapted from Spotify and Genius.

=== Vocalists ===
- Money Man – primary artist
- Juney Knotzz – featured artist (tracks 2 and 15)
- BC Jroc – featured artist (track 17)

=== Production ===
- Yung Lan – producer (tracks 1, 3–5, 8, 10, 15, and 17)
- PopDatOli – producer (tracks 1 and 17)
- Yung Dee – producer (tracks 2 and 11)
- ProdByLanden – producer (track 2)
- PHIL – producer (track 2)
- ScOnTheTrack – producer (track 5)
- MoXart Beatz – producer (track 6)
- AYL – producer (track 6)
- OJ Finessey – producer (track 6)
- Lala The DJ – producer (tracks 7, 9, 18, and 19)
- King Osama – producer (tracks 7, 9, and 19)
- Nile Wave – producer (track 7)
- Juko – producer (tracks 8, 15, and 19)
- Spacy – producer (track 9)
- Staysolidtrey – producer (track 9)
- Rjayy – producer (track 11)
- LC – producer (track 11)
- Section 8 – producer (tracks 12–14)
- Omar Guetfa – producer (track 13)
- Martin Sole – producer (track 13)
- Cubeatz – producer (track 14)
- Rafmade – producer (track 16)
- Ginseng – producer (track 16)
- Trauma Tone – producer (track 16)
- AlekBeatz – producer (track 18)
- Caerus – producer (track 18)
- Ebeasy – producer (track 18)
- MacShooter – producer (track 19)
- Trademark – producer (track 20)
- ShortyyK – producer (track 20)
- Luxury – producer (track 20)

== Charts ==
Chart performance for Blackout
Chart (2022)	Peak position
US Billboard 200	168
US Independent Albums (Billboard)	26
