= FML =

FML may refer to:

== Computing ==
- Face Modeling Language, an XML-based language that describes face animation
- "Fuck my life", an expression of one's frustration, often used in SMS language

- FMyLife, a blog

- Football Manager Live, a video game
- Fuzzy markup language, in computer science, language for implementation-independent specification of a fuzzy system
- Forge Mod Loader, the Mod Loader used by Forge, for Minecraft.

== Materials ==
- Fiber metal laminate, a material composed of metal layers and composite materials
- A brand name for the medication fluorometholone, a corticosteroid

== Music ==
- FML (EP), by Seventeen, 2023
- "FML" (song), by Kanye West, 2016
- "FML" (Arizona Zervas song), 2018
- "FML", an instrumental by Deadmau5 from For Lack of a Better Name, 2009

== Organisations ==
- Fan Milk, a Ghanaian ice cream manufacturer
- Feed My Lambs, an American educational charity
- Fiji Muslim League, a religious organization based in Fiji
- Flint Metro League, a high school sports league in the Flint, Michigan area
- Friedrich Miescher Laboratory of the Max Planck Society, a research institute in Tübingen, Germany

== Other ==
- Feldmarschall-Leutnant (Lieutenant field marshal), a rank in the Austrian and later Austro-Hungarian Army
- FML, station code for Frimley railway station in England
