= Chi Chi (music producer) =

Nigerian-American record producer from Georgia

- Born: Chidi Osondu; Jonesboro, Georgia, U.S.
- Genres: Hip hop; trap
- Occupations: Record producer; songwriter
- Instrument: FL Studio
- Label: Universal Music Publishing Group

Chidi Osondu, professionally known as Chi Chi, is a Nigerian-American record producer and songwriter signed with Universal Music Publishing Group. He is a frequent collaborator with Atlanta rapper Lil Baby, having produced several songs for his studio albums My Turn and The Voice of the Heroes, as well as his single "On Me" which peaked at number 15 on the Billboard Hot 100. He has produced other hits such as BRS Kash's "Throat Baby (Go Baby)", which peaked at number 24 on the Billboard Hot 100, and Gucci Mane's "Both Sides", and has also worked with rappers Rylo Rodriguez, Yungeen Ace, and Caleb Colossus. His works are identified by his producer tag "What's happenin' Chi Chi?".

== Early life ==
Born in Jonesboro, Georgia, Chi Chi was raised in a Nigerian household and was strongly influenced by Afrobeats music and blueprint styles created by producers such as Wheezy and Southside.

== Career ==
Chi Chi made a name for himself throughout 2020 with his collaborations with artists such as Lil Baby on his triple platinum album My Turn, BRS Kash, Gucci Mane, and Rylo Rodriguez. It was described as a "groundbreaking" year for him by The Source.

Announced on April 8, 2021, Chi Chi signed an exclusive label deal with Universal Music Publishing Group, who believe he will become one of the industry's most sought-after producers. Not long after, he worked with Rylo Rodriguez on his single "Mo Money Mo Followers", and three songs in Lil Baby and Lil Durk's collaborative studio album The Voice of the Heroes, released on June 4.

== Production discography ==
Title	Artist	Album	Year
"Big Cap"	Caleb Colossus	When Paint Smears	2019
"Virgil Abloh"	Caleb Colossus	When Paint Smears	2019
"In Love" (featuring DeJ Loaf)	Yungeen Ace	Step Harder	2019
"Renaissance Man"	Caleb Colossus	non-album single	2019
"Solid"	Lil Baby	My Turn	2020
"Social Distancing"	Lil Baby	My Turn	2020
"Get Money"	Lil Baby	My Turn	2020
"Both Sides" (featuring Lil Baby)	Gucci Mane	Gucci Mane Presents: So Icy Summer	2020
"Throat Baby (Go Baby)"	BRS Kash	non-album single	2020
"G.I.H.F."	Rylo Rodriguez	G.I.H.F.	2020
"Dreaming"	Rylo Rodriguez	G.I.H.F.	2020
"Home Run"	Rylo Rodriguez	G.I.H.F.	2020
"On Me"	Lil Baby	non-album single	2020
"Thug Cry"	BRS Kash	Kash Only	2021
"Mo Money Mo Followers"	Rylo Rodriguez	non-album single	2021
"shop" (featuring DaBaby)	Toosii	Thank You for Believing	2021
"Choppa Love"	SpotemGottem	Most Wanted	2021
"Hats Off" (featuring Travis Scott)	Lil Baby and Lil Durk	The Voice of the Heroes	2021
"How It Feels"	Lil Baby and Lil Durk	The Voice of the Heroes	2021
"If You Want To"	Lil Baby and Lil Durk	The Voice of the Heroes	2021
"Find a Way" (featuring Lil Baby)	H.E.R.	Back of My Mind	2021
