= Fuck my life =

Fuck my life may refer to:

- Fucked For Life, a criminal network based in Tumba, Sweden
- FMyLife, an English-language blog
- Fuck My Life (film), a 2010 Chilean film
- FML, an initialism that can mean "Fuck my life"
