= Twerkulator =

2021 single by City Girls

Single by City Girls
- Released: May 21, 2021
- Length: 2:18
- Label: Quality Control; Motown; Capitol
- Songwriters: Arthur Baker; Curtis Alan Jones; Ellis Williams; Emil Schult; John Miller; Caresha Brownlee; Jatavia Johnson; John Robie; Afrika Bambaataa; Ralf Hütter; Robert Allen
- Producer: Mr. Hanky

City Girls singles chronology
"Throat Baby (Go Baby) [Remix]" (2021)	"Twerkulator" (2021)	"Scared" (2021)

"Twerkulator" is a song recorded by American hip hop duo City Girls. It was released on May 21, 2021, through Quality Control, Motown and Capitol.

== Background and release ==
JT
(@ThegirlJT)
tweeted:

Thank you to our team for fighting hard 😭💕💕💕💕 now we can shake ass this summer!!!!!

May 18, 2021

In March 2021, Yung Miami, one of the members of the duo, said that "Twerkulator" couldn't be released due to the instrumental it uses not being cleared. In May, JT, the other member of the duo, revealed that the instrumental was cleared and that the song could be released.

"Twerkulator" follows the release of City Girls' second studio album, City on Lock. The song went viral on TikTok prior to its release. A music video directed by Missy Elliott was released for the song.

== Composition ==
"Twerkulator" makes usage of the instrumental of the 1982 song "Planet Rock" by Afrika Bambaataa, which in turn had sampled Kraftwerk's ""Trans-Europe Express" (song)" and "Numbers". It also interpolates the lyric from "Percolator" by Cajmere.

== Reception ==
In an interview with Vice, rapper Trick Daddy opined that "Twerkulator" was "on pace to become the song of the summer".

=== Accolades ===
Critical rankings for "Twerkulator"
Publication	Accolade	Rank	Ref.
Pitchfork	The 100 Best Songs of 2021	85	

== Charts ==
=== Weekly charts ===
Weekly chart performance for "Twerkulator"
Chart (2021)	Peak position
Global 200 (Billboard)	82
New Zealand Hot Singles (RMNZ)	34
US Billboard Hot 100	51
US Hot R&B/Hip-Hop Songs (Billboard)	19
US Rhythmic (Billboard)	14

=== Year-end charts ===
Year-end chart performance for "Twerkulator"
Chart (2021)	Position
US Hot R&B/Hip-Hop Songs (Billboard)	93

== Certifications ==
Region	Certification	Certified units/sales
United States (RIAA)	Gold	500,000^{‡}
^{‡} Sales+streaming figures based on certification alone.
