= Fallin' (EP) =

EP by StaySolidRocky
- Released: July 17, 2020
- Genre: Hip hop
- Length: 19:50
- Label: Columbia Records
- Producer: Nashi; Chriz Beatz; Drumma Boy; SephGotTheWaves; Glaazer; KFK; Chris Productions; Niko

Singles from Fallin'
- 1. "Toxic" Released: December 11, 2019; 2. "Soft Aggression" Released: March 4, 2020; 3. "Party Girl" Released: April 21, 2020; 4. "Party Girl (Remix)" Released: July 10, 2020

Fallin' is an extended play (EP) by American rapper StaySolidRocky. It was released on July 17, 2020, by Columbia Records. The EP features production by Nashi, Chriz Beatz, Drumma Boy, SephGotTheWaves, Glaazer, KFK, Chris Productions, and Niko. The mixtape includes features from Lil Uzi Vert and Big4Keezy.

== Artwork ==
The cover art features a cartoon of StaySolidRocky falling into a black hole, while the track listing depicts him nearly fully submerged in the black hole.

== Singles ==
On December 11, 2019, the EP's first single and sixth track "Toxic" was released via SoundCloud. On April 6, 2020, the track was released via Apple Music and Spotify.

On March 4, 2020, the EP's second single and seventh track "Soft Aggression" was released via Apple Music and Spotify. On March 5, 2020, the track was released via SoundCloud.

On April 21, 2020, the EP's third single and third track "Party Girl" was released via SoundCloud. On April 21, 2020, the track was released via Apple Music and Spotify.

On June 19, 2020, the EP's fourth single and fifth track "Vacant Heart" was released via Apple Music, SoundCloud, and Spotify.

On July 10, 2020, the EP's fifth single and third track "Party Girl (Remix) was released via Apple Music, SoundCloud, and Spotify.

== Release and promotion ==
On July 10, 2020, the visualizer for the EP's first track "Party Girl (Remix)" was released. As of August 2020, the visualizer has accumulated nearly 3 million views.

On December 24, 2019, the music video for the EP's third track "Party Girl" was released. As of August 2020, the music video has accumulated over 70 million views.

On July 16, 2020, the music video for the EP's fifth track "Vacant Heart" was released. As of August 2020, the music video has accumulated over 300 thousand views.

On June 15, 2020, the music video for the EP's sixth track "Toxic" was released. As of August 2020, the music video has accumulated nearly 900 thousand views.

== Track listing ==
Credits were adapted from Tidal.

No.	Title	Writer(s)	Producer(s)	Length
1.	"Party Girl (Remix)" (featuring Lil Uzi Vert)	Darak Figueroa; Edgar Bustos; Symere Woods	Nashi	2:28
2.	"Viola"	Figueroa	Chriz Beatz; Drumma Boy	2:39
3.	"Party Girl"	Figueroa; Edgar Bustos	Nashi	2:28
4.	"Rip N Runnin'" (featuring Big4Keezy)	Figueroa	SephGotTheWaves; Glaazer	2:36
5.	"Vacant Heart" (featuring Big4Keezy)	Figueroa; Latrell Collins; Kenley Pierre	KFK	2:48
6.	"Toxic"	Figueroa; Solomon Sobande	Chris Productions	3:34
7.	"Soft Aggression"	Figueroa; Leonsio Muca; Lucas Cardoso Suckow; Alexandra Tjernagel	Niko	3:17
Total length:				19:50

== Personnel ==
Credits were adapted from Tidal.

Performers

- StaySolidRocky – primary artist
- Lil Uzi Vert – featured artist (track 1)
- Big4Keezy – featured artist (tracks 4, 5)

Technical

- THEDONRRRM – mastering engineer (tracks 1–4, 6, 7), mixing engineer (tracks 1–7)
- StaySolidRocky – recording engineer (tracks 1–7)
- Joe Grasso – mixing engineer (track 1)

Production

- Nashi – producer (tracks 1, 3)
- Chriz Beats – producer (track 2)
- Drumma Boy – producer (track 2)
- Glaazer – producer (track 4)
- SephGotTheWaves – producer (track 4)
- Kfk – producer (track 5)
- Chris Productions – producer (track 6)
- Niko – producer (track 7)

== Charts ==
Chart performance for Fallin'
Chart (2020)	Peak position
Canadian Albums (Billboard)	53
Finnish Albums (Suomen virallinen lista)	25
US Billboard 200	65
US Top R&B/Hip-Hop Albums (Billboard)	38
