= On Me (Lil Baby song) =

2020 single by Lil Baby

Single by Lil Baby
- Released: December 4, 2020
- Genre: Trap
- Length: 2:15
- Label: Quality Control; Motown
- Songwriters: Dominique Jones; Chidi Osondu; Amman Nurani
- Producers: Chi Chi; Evrgrn

Lil Baby singles chronology
"Errbody" (2020)	"On Me" (2020)	"Sex Lies" (2020)

Music video
- "On Me" on YouTube
- "On Me (Remix)" on YouTube

"On Me" is a song by American rapper Lil Baby, released alongside "Errbody", on December 4, 2020, a day after his 26th birthday. The song was written alongside producers Chi Chi and Evrgrn. The official remix of the song with fellow American rapper-songwriter Megan Thee Stallion was released on April 27, 2021.

== Background and composition ==
After a snippet of the song was teased on Instagram, Lil Baby confirmed the release of the song on his birthday. Presumably, the song was dedicated to his girlfriend Jayda Cheaves. Tom Breihan of Stereogum has called the song a "triumphant victory-lap track".

== Music video ==
The music video was released alongside the single. It was directed by Keemotion, and co-directed by Lil Baby. The video shows "expensive rides" with the rapper and his friends; Baby travels with them and is seen on a private jet, jet skiing and cruising on a yacht.

== Remix ==
In March 2021, Lil Baby revealed on social media the possibility of a remix of "On Me" featuring a female artist. On April 27, 2021, the remix was released alongside a music video, as a collaboration with Megan Thee Stallion.

=== Remix video ===
Directed by Mike Ho, the music video for the remix features the rappers as "the rulers of a cream kingdom". It opens with Lil Baby in front of an "icy fortress", backdropped by a mountain of ice crystals and falling snowflakes. While he performs his verse, Megan appears beside him lip-syncing. She then raps atop a smoky volcano wearing a black latex bodysuit, which is "fittingly ornamented with lava graphics".

== Charts ==
=== Original ===
==== Weekly charts ====
Chart (2020–2021)	Peak position
Canada Hot 100 (Billboard)	57
Global 200 (Billboard)	47
US Billboard Hot 100	15
US Hot R&B/Hip-Hop Songs (Billboard)	7
US Rhythmic Airplay (Billboard)	7

==== Year-end charts ====
Year-end chart performance for "On Me"
Chart (2021)	Position
Global 200 (Billboard)	137
US Billboard Hot 100	36
US Hot R&B/Hip-Hop Songs (Billboard)	16
US Rhythmic (Billboard)	36

=== Megan Thee Stallion remix ===
Chart (2021)	Peak position
US Digital Song Sales (Billboard)	7
US R&B/Hip-Hop Digital Song Sales (Billboard)	4

== Certifications ==
Region	Certification	Certified units/sales
Canada (Music Canada)	Platinum	80,000^{‡}
United Kingdom (BPI)	Gold	400,000^{‡}
United States (RIAA)	3× Platinum	3,000,000^{‡}
^{‡} Sales+streaming figures based on certification alone.
