= FML (Arizona Zervas song) =

2018 single by Arizona Zervas

Single by Arizona Zervas

from the EP Living Facts
- Released: May 31, 2018
- Length: 3:43
- Songwriter(s): Arizona Zervas; Reuel Walker; Jace Jennings
- Producer(s): Reuel; 94Skrt

Arizona Zervas singles chronology
"Parted Ways" (2018)	"FML" (2018)	"Living Facts" (2018)

Music video
- "FML" on YouTube

"FML" is a song by American rapper and singer Arizona Zervas, released on May 31, 2018 as the lead single from his EP Living Facts (2018). Produced by Reuel and 94Skrt, it was a sleeper hit, gaining more attention following Zervas' rise to fame in 2019 from the success of his song "Roxanne".

== Background ==
In an interview with Flaunt, Arizona Zervas stated the song is a true story about a love interest who picked him up in a Mercedes Benz the first day they met.

== Charts ==
Chart (2020)	Peak position
Canada (Canadian Hot 100)	57
Ireland (IRMA)	99
New Zealand Hot Singles (RMNZ)	15
US Bubbling Under Hot 100 Singles (Billboard)	21
US Rhythmic (Billboard)	28

== Certifications ==
Region	Certification	Certified units/sales
Canada (Music Canada)	Gold	40,000^{‡}
New Zealand (RMNZ)	Gold	15,000^{‡}
United States (RIAA)	Platinum	1,000,000^{‡}
^{‡} Sales+streaming figures based on certification alone.
