= Red Eye (mixtape) =

Mixtape by Money Man
- Released: March 17, 2023
- Genre: Hip hop; trap
- Length: 34:31
- Label: Empire; Black Circle
- Producer: Alawais; Bosley; CorMill; Cubeatz; Figurez Made It; Flex on the Beat; Harto Beats; Hennen; MacShooter; Mello Maestro; OJ Beatz; Peetie Beats; ProdTao; Rafmade; Rob Marley; Shark; TezToy; Theevoni; YS Trakkz

Money Man chronology
Blackout (2022)	Red Eye (2023)

Red Eye is a mixtape by American rapper Money Man. It was released on March 17, 2023, by Empire Distribution and Black Circle. The mixtape features three guest appearances from Babyface Ray, Peezy, and Juney Knotzz. Production was handled by CorMill, YS Trakkz, Cubeatz, and Figurez Made It, among others. The mixtape debuted at number 93 on the US Billboard 200 in its first week, dated April 1, 2023.

== Background ==
On March 9, 2023, Money Man announced on Twitter that he would drop his forthcoming project on March 17.

== Critical reception ==
Professional ratings
Review scores
Source	Rating
RatingsGameMusic	C
AllMusic	2.5/5 stars

Red Eye was met with generally mixed reviews from music critics. The critic from RatingsGameMusic, commented saying that the project is a "solid trap album". He also stated that Money Man "rapped with more energy on it, and that the trap beats he did his work over sounded a little more complex". Plus, the critic praised the mixtape saying that mixtape is "one of those that you simply let run in the background to catch a vibe". And, the critic gave the mixtape a "C".

AllMusic stated that the mixtape's tracks with guest appearances "provide a bit more variation, otherwise it's the same standard-issue trap beats and monotonous vocals heard on most of Money Man's releases".

== Track listing ==
Credits adapted from Tidal and Genius.

All tracks are written by Tysen Bolding.

Red Eye track listing
No.	Title	Producer(s)	Length
1.	"Drums" (with Babyface Ray)	CorMill; Alawais; ProdTao	3:02
2.	"Biggest Lie"	YS Trakkz; OJ Beatz	2:02
3.	"Insane"	YS Trakkz; Rob Marley^{[a]}; Peetie Beats^{[a]}	1:48
4.	"Law"	YS Trakkz; Rob Marley^{[a]}	2:02
5.	"Arms Race"	YS Trakkz; Flex on the Beat	2:02
6.	"Traits"	YS Trakkz; OJ Beatz	2:02
7.	"Contributions"	YS Trakkz	2:05
8.	"Saweetie"	Rafmade; MacShooter; Cubeatz	2:13
9.	"Ain't Ya Friend"	YS Trakkz; OJ Beatz	2:11
10.	"Latest Gen" (with Peezy)	Rafmade; Bosley	3:25
11.	"Today"	YS Trakkz; Mello Maestro^{[a]}	2:06
12.	"Atmosphere" (with Juney Knotzz)	CorMill; Harto Beats	3:02
13.	"Jet Speed"	CorMill; Theevoni; Hennen	2:02
14.	"Opposite"	CorMill; Theevoni; TezToy	2:20
15.	"Vory"	CorMill; Theevoni; Shark; Figurez Made It^{[a]}	2:09
Total length:			34:31

=== Notes ===
- ^{^[a]} signifies a co-producer

== Personnel ==
Credits adapted from Tidal.

=== Vocalists ===
- Money Man – primary artist
- Babyface Ray – featured artist (track 1)
- Peezy – featured artist (track 10)
- Juney Knotzz – featured artist (track 12)

=== Production ===
- CorMill – producer (tracks 1, 12–15)
- Alawais – producer (track 1)
- ProdTao – producer (track 1)
- YS Trakkz – producer (tracks 2–7, 9 and 11)
- OJ Beatz – producer (tracks 2 and 6)
- Rob Marley – co-producer (tracks 3 and 4)
- Peetie Beats – co-producer (track 3)
- Flex on the Beat – producer (track 5)
- Rafmade – producer (tracks 8 and 10)
- MacShooter – producer (track 8)
- Cubeatz – producer (track 8)
- Bosley – producer (track 10)
- Mello Maestro – co-producer (track 11)
- Harto Beats – producer (track 12)
- Theevoni – producer (tracks 13–15)
- Hennen – producer (track 13)
- TezToy – producer (track 14)
- Shark – producer (track 15)
- Figurez Made It – co-producer (track 15)

== Charts ==
Chart performance for Red Eye
Chart (2023)	Peak position
US Billboard 200	93
