= Errbody =

2020 single by Lil Baby

Single by Lil Baby
- Released: December 4, 2020
- Length: 3:30
- Label: Quality Control; Motown
- Songwriters: Dominique Jones; Rai'Shaun Williams
- Producer: Section 8

Lil Baby singles chronology
"I Met Tay Keith First" (2020)	"Errbody" (2020)	"On Me" (2020)

Music video
- "Errbody" on YouTube

"Errbody" is a song by American rapper Lil Baby, released together with another song, "On Me", on December 4, 2020, a day after his 26th birthday. The song was produced by Section 8 and peaked at number 41 on the Billboard Hot 100.

== Background and composition ==
"Errbody" was announced by Lil Baby on his birthday, and is the first of the two songs to hit streaming services. Sophie Caraan of Hypebeast called the song a "braggadocios and hard-hitting cut". In it, Lil Baby uses a "fast, twisty singsong flow over an eerie, low-key beat", and boasts his wealth and status in the rap game.

== Music video ==
The music video was released alongside the single. Directed by Edgar Estevez, Daps and Christian Breslauer, the video finds Lil Baby in a car fleeing from an enemy firing gunshots at him. Baby and his associates also ride in helicopters around his neighborhood, on a deadly mission to take out his enemies.

== Charts ==
Chart (2020)	Peak position
Canada Hot 100 (Billboard)	56
US Billboard Hot 100	41
US Hot R&B/Hip-Hop Songs (Billboard)	8
