= Voice of the Heroes =

2021 single by Lil Baby and Lil Durk

Single by Lil Baby and Lil Durk

from the album The Voice of the Heroes
- Released: May 31, 2021
- Length: 3:29
- Label: Quality Control; Wolfpack Global Music; Motown; Alamo
- Songwriters: Dominique Jones; Durk Banks; Trenton Turner; Ethan Hayes
- Producers: Touch of Trent; Haze

Lil Baby singles chronology
"We Win" (2021)	"Voice of the Heroes" (2021)	"Mastercard" (2021)

Lil Durk singles chronology
"24 Hours" (2021)	"Voice of the Heroes" (2021)	"Fast Lane" (2021)

Music video
- "Voice of the Heroes" on YouTube

"Voice of the Heroes" is a song by American rappers Lil Baby and Lil Durk. Written alongside producers Touch of Trent and Haze, it was released on May 31, 2021 as the lead single from their namesake collaborative studio album The Voice of the Heroes (2021), with an accompanying music video.

== Composition ==
In the song, Lil Baby and Lil Durk talk about their journeys to success and celebrating it, as well as their "inevitable responsibility as 'heroes' to the friends and family they rose with." Durk reflects his life in the past year, such as missing family time and payment bonds. Baby sings about his dominance in the rap industry and hints at a "downtick of guest features on his part". The chorus explains that Lil Durk is the titular "voice" and Lil Baby is the "hero". They also mention their time in prison.

== Music video ==
The music video was directed by Daps and filmed in Lil Baby's hometown of Oakland City, Atlanta. In it, the rappers toss money off a roof and connect with different generations in the city. Lil Durk also raps in front of a police car.

== Charts ==
Chart performance for "Voice of the Heroes"
Chart (2021)	Peak position
Canada Hot 100 (Billboard)	43
Global 200 (Billboard)	35
Ireland (IRMA)	98
UK Singles (Official Charts)	62
UK Hip Hop/R&B (Official Charts)	24
US Billboard Hot 100	21
US Hot R&B/Hip-Hop Songs (Billboard)	7

== Certifications ==
Region	Certification	Certified units/sales
United States (RIAA)	Gold	500,000^{‡}
^{‡} Sales+streaming figures based on certification alone.
