= The Voice of the Heroes =

Studio album by Lil Baby-Lil Durk (2021)

Studio album by Lil Baby and Lil Durk
- Released: June 4, 2021
- Length: 59:45
- Labels: Quality Control; 4PF; Only the Family; Capitol; Motown; Alamo
- Producers: ATL Jacob; Chi Chi; DannyProd; DJ Young Pharaoh; Flex OTB; Foreverolling; Haze; Iroc; Jasper Harris; KJ; London on da Track; Luke C; MFoss; Murda Beatz; Nick Papz; Nile Waves; Noah; Rockin Wit Slime; Russ Chell; Section 8; TnTXD; Tone Deaf; Touch of Trent; Turbo; Wheezy; Young TN

Lil Baby chronology
My Turn (2020)	The Voice of the Heroes (2021)	It's Only Me (2022)

Lil Durk chronology
The Voice (2020)	The Voice of the Heroes (2021)	7220 (2022)

Singles from The Voice of the Heroes
- 1. "Voice of the Heroes" Released: May 31, 2021

The Voice of the Heroes is a collaborative studio album by American rappers Lil Baby and Lil Durk. It was released through Quality Control Music, 4 Pockets Full, Only the Family, and Alamo Records on June 4, 2021. Its title comes from Durk's childhood nickname of "the Voice" and Baby's nickname of "the Hero" that Lil Durk had given him. The album contains guest appearances from Travis Scott, Meek Mill, Young Thug, and Rod Wave with notable production from London on da Track, Wheezy, Turbo, and Murda Beatz. It was preceded by the single, "Voice of the Heroes", the title and opening track, which was released on May 31, 2021.

== Background and recording ==
In February 2021, Durk began posting several images of him and Lil Baby during the video shoot for their song "Finesse Out the Gang Way" with the caption "The Voice x The Hero", giving Lil Baby the nickname "The Hero" and himself as "The Voice". The following month, Durk made a post on Instagram with the caption saying if the post reaches 100k comments, he and Lil Baby will release their collaborative tape. On March 15, during an interview with MTV News, Baby confirmed the album's title The Voice of the Heroes. In April, Lil Baby was spotted recording with Travis Scott. The following month, Baby and Durk teased the album's initial May 28 release date, however, Swizz Beatz stated that the album was postponed in favour of DMX's posthumous album Exodus. On May 23, Baby took to Twitter to announce the album had finished recording and was scheduled for a June 4, 2021 release date.

== Release and promotion ==
On May 31, 2021, the title track was released as the lead single, accompanied by a music video. On June 2, the tracklist of the album was released revealing features from Travis Scott, Meek Mill, Young Thug, and Rod Wave. The album was then released on June 4. The following day, the music video for "How It Feels" was released.

== Critical reception ==
Professional ratings
Aggregate scores
Source	Rating
Metacritic	67/100
Review scores
Source	Rating
AllMusic	3.5/5 stars
Clash	6/10
NME	3/5 stars
Pitchfork	7.1/10

The Voice of the Heroes received generally favorable reviews from contemporary music critics, with some critics highlighting the duo's partnership. At Metacritic, which assigns a normalized rating out of 100 to reviews from professional publications, the album received an average score of 67, based on six reviews.

Robin Murray from the Clash wrote: "It's a mark of the clear respect and friendship between Lil Baby and Lil Durk, then, that 'The Voice Of The Heroes' develops a coherent voice, with the two working towards a common goal. Sure, it's not perfect - at 18 tracks it could do with some trimming". Writing for Allmusic, Fred Thomas stated that "The nearly hour-long running time drags somewhat, and some songs could have been left off the final cut. Still, The Voice of the Heroes is carried primarily by Durk and Baby's chemistry as they adapt to each other without either of them watering down their individualistic styles".

== Commercial performance ==
On June 5, 2021, the album received early first-week sales projections from music industry forecasters of 165,000 to 185,000 units—making the predictions lower than My Turn’s first week sales (197,000) but higher than any album released by Durk.

The Voice of the Heroes debuted at number one on the US Billboard 200 chart, earning 150,000 album-equivalent units (including 4,000 copies in pure album sales) in its first week, according to MRC Data. This was lower than music industry forecasts expected. Likewise, the album became Lil Baby's second and Lil Durk's first US number one album on the chart. The album also accumulated a total of 197.71 million on-demand streams of the album’s songs. In addition, a total of 16 songs from the album managed to chart on the US Billboard Hot 100, led by "Hats Off" (with Travis Scott) and "Voice of the Heroes" that peaked at numbers 16 and 21 respectively.

In its second week, the album dropped to number four on the Billboard 200, earning an additional 73,000 units. In its third week, the album climbed to number three on the chart, earning 57,000 more units. In its fourth week, the album dropped to number four on the chart, earning 52,000 units, bringing its four-week total to 332,000 units.

== Track listing ==
The Voice of the Heroes track listing
No.	Title	Writer(s)	Producer(s)	Length
1.	"Voice of the Heroes"	Dominique Jones; Durk Banks; Trenton Turner; Ethan Hayes	Touch of Trent; Haze	3:29
2.	"2040"	D. Jones; Banks; Jeffrey Jones Jr.; Aaron Butler	Foreverolling; Flex OTB	3:12
3.	"Hats Off" (with Travis Scott)	D. Jones; Banks; Jacques Webster II; Chidi Osundu; Thanush Perinpanesan	Chi Chi; Young TN	4:17
4.	"Who I Want"	D. Jones; Banks; Wesley Glass	Wheezy	2:53
5.	"Still Hood"	D. Jones; Banks; London Holmes	London on da Track; Tone Deaf; Rockin Wit Slime	3:15
6.	"Man of My Word"	D. Jones; Banks; Nile Bey; Roderick Hughey; Broderick Hughey	Nile Waves; Iroc; DJ Young Pharaoh	2:52
7.	"Still Runnin" (with Meek Mill)	D. Jones; Banks; Robert Williams; Nikolas Papamitrou; Nii-Noi Tetteh	Nick Papz; KJ	2:53
8.	"Medical"	D. Jones; Banks; Holmes	London on da Track; Tone Deaf; Rockin Wit Slime; MFoss	3:07
9.	"How It Feels"	D. Jones; Banks; Osundu; Rai'shaun Williams; Noah Pettigrew	Chi Chi; Section 8; Noah	2:46
10.	"Lying"	D. Jones; Banks; Jacob Canady	ATL Jacob	3:01
11.	"Okay"	D. Jones; Banks; Daniel Delgado-Hernandez	DannyProd	3:36
12.	"That's Facts"	D. Jones; Banks; Glass	Wheezy	3:38
13.	"Please"	D. Jones; Banks; Chandler Durham	Turbo	3:26
14.	"Up the Side" (with Young Thug)	D. Jones; Banks; Jeffery Williams; Glass	Wheezy	3:38
15.	"If You Want To"	D. Jones; Banks; Osundu; Ra. Williams; Russell Chell; Jasper Harris	Chi Chi; Section 8; Russ Chell; Harris	3:15
16.	"Rich Off Pain" (with Rod Wave)	D. Jones; Banks; Rodarius Green; Thomas Horton; Luke Walker	TnTXD; Luke C	3:55
17.	"Make It Out"	D. Jones; Banks; Shane Lindstrom	Murda Beatz	3:06
18.	"Bruised Up"	D. Jones; Banks; Canady	ATL Jacob	3:26
Total length:				59:45

== Charts ==
=== Weekly charts ===
Weekly chart performance for The Voice of the Heroes
Chart (2021)	Peak position
Australian Albums (ARIA)	20
Austrian Albums (Ö3 Austria)	25
Belgian Albums (Ultratop Flanders)	20
Belgian Albums (Ultratop Wallonia)	100
Canadian Albums (Billboard)	2
Danish Albums (Hitlisten)	19
Dutch Albums (Album Top 100)	7
French Albums (SNEP)	103
German Albums (Offizielle Top 100)	70
Irish Albums (Official Charts)	17
Italian Albums (FIMI)	58
Lithuanian Albums (AGATA)	33
New Zealand Albums (RMNZ)	21
Norwegian Albums (VG-lista)	8
Swedish Albums (Sverigetopplistan)	47
Swiss Albums (Schweizer Hitparade)	10
UK Albums (Official Charts)	5
UK R&B Albums (Official Charts)	24
US Billboard 200	1
US Top R&B/Hip-Hop Albums (Billboard)	1

=== Year-end charts ===
2021 year-end chart performance for The Voice of the Heroes
Chart (2021)	Position
US Billboard 200	38
US Top R&B/Hip-Hop Albums (Billboard)	18

2022 year-end chart performance for The Voice of the Heroes
Chart (2022)	Position
US Billboard 200	82
US Top R&B/Hip-Hop Albums (Billboard)	51

== Certifications ==
Certifications and sales for The Voice of the Heroes
Region	Certification	Certified units/sales
United Kingdom (BPI)	Silver	60,000^{‡}
United States (RIAA)	Platinum	1,000,000^{‡}
^{‡} Sales+streaming figures based on certification alone.
