= Throat Baby (Go Baby) =

2021 single by BRS Kash

Single by BRS Kash

from the album Kash Only
- Released: July 24, 2020
- Genre: Southern hip hop; R&B; Dirty rap
- Length: 3:38
- Label: Team Litty; LVRN; Interscope
- Songwriter: Kenneth Duncan
- Producers: Adamslides; Chi Chi

BRS Kash singles chronology
"Throat Baby (Go Baby)" (2020)	"30 Stacks" (2021)

Music video
- "Throat Baby (Go Baby)" on YouTube

"Throat Baby (Go Baby)" is the debut single by American rapper BRS Kash. It was released on July 24, 2020, originally through Team Litty and later with Love Renaissance and Interscope Records, as the lead single from BRS Kash's debut mixtape, Kash Only (2021). The dirty Southern hip hop and R&B song was written by Kash & Elliot Prince, who wrote it as an ode to fellatio inspired by two separate sexual encounters, with production by Adamslides and Chi Chi.

The track became popular on video-sharing social media platform TikTok in late 2020, and peaked at number 24 on the Billboard Hot 100 chart. It was included on lists of the best songs of 2020 published by Vice and NPR. A remix of the song with American rapper DaBaby and American hip hop duo City Girls was released on January 21, 2021.

== Background and composition ==
Kash first recorded "Throat Baby" while "joking around", and was at first apprehensive about releasing it, fearing that he would receive backlash for "just degrading women". The track gained traction on the video-sharing platform TikTok in October 2020, where a dance set to the song became popular.

"Throat Baby" is a dirty Southern hip hop and R&B song. The intro of the song contains a sample of Kash's best friend, who died after the song's release, laughing and talking with her friends after crashing Kash's studio session. Its lyrics are written as an ode to fellatio and were inspired by "a crazy experience with one of [Kash's] homegirls" the night before Kash wrote the song, as well as a later sexual experience with her friend in the backseat of a Toyota Sprinter.

Jewel Wicker of GQ described "Throat Baby" as "a melodic ode to sexual desire and the things it can drive someone to do", while Uproxx's Aaron Williams called it a "campy, anti-romance anthem". Writing for Okayplayer, Robyn Mowatt referred to the track as a "stripper anthem" that "exists between R&B and trap music".

== Live performance ==
Kash gave a live performance of "Throat Baby" as part of the Uproxx Sessions series in October 2020. He headlined a drive-in rally for then-US Senate candidates Jon Ossoff and Raphael Warnock in Lithonia, Georgia in December 2020 prior to the runoffs for the 2020–21 Senate election and special election, where he changed the lyrics of "Throat Baby" to "Vote Baby". Following his performance at the rally, various Republicans circulated tweets from Kash which referenced sexual assault.

== Remix ==
"Throat Baby (Go Baby) (Remix)"

Single by BRS Kash, DaBaby and City Girls

from the album Kash Only
- Released: January 21, 2021
- Length: 3:31
- Label: Team Litty; LVRN; Interscope
- Songwriters: Adam Foster; Brittany "Chi" Coney; Caresha Romeka Brownlee; Chidi Steve Osondu; Denisia "Blu June" Andrews; Jatavia Shakara Johnson; Jonathan Kirk; Kenneth Duncan; Kinta "Ball Greezy" Cox
- Producers: Adamslides; Chi Chi

BRS Kash singles chronology
"Throat Baby (Go Baby)" (2020)	"Throat Baby (Go Baby) (Remix)" (2021)	"Kash App" (2021)

DaBaby singles chronology
"Masterpiece" (2021)	"Throat Baby (Go Baby) (Remix)" (2021)	"Cry Baby" (2021)

City Girls singles chronology
"Said Sum (Remix)" (2020)	"Throat Baby (Go Baby) (Remix)" (2021)	"Twerkulator" (2021)

Music video
- "Throat Baby (Go Baby) (Remix)" on YouTube

A remix of "Throat Baby (Go Baby)" featuring American rapper DaBaby and American hip hop duo City Girls was released on January 21, 2021. It was first teased in a post on Kash's Instagram account made less than a week before its release. Jon Powell of Revolt called the remix "an even more adults-only effort for fans to enjoy, especially from the feminine perspective". The remix debuted and peaked at number 63 on the Rolling Stone Top 100.

== Personnel ==
Credits adapted from Tidal.

=== Original ===
- BRS Kash – vocals, songwriting
- Adamslides – production
- Chi Chi – production
- Jaycen Joshua – mixing

=== Remix ===
- BRS Kash – vocals, songwriting
- DaBaby – vocals, songwriting
- Yung Miami – vocals, songwriting
- JT – vocals, songwriting
- Adamslides – production, songwriting
- Chi Chi – production, songwriting
- Brittany "Chi" Coney – songwriting
- Denisia "Blu June" Andrews – songwriting
- Kinta "Ball Greezy" Cox – songwriting
- Colin Leonard – mastering
- D-Billy – mixing

== Charts ==
=== Weekly charts ===
Chart performance for "Throat Baby (Go Baby)"
Chart (2021)	Peak position
Global 200 (Billboard)	88
US Billboard Hot 100	24
US Hot R&B/Hip-Hop Songs (Billboard)	10
US Rhythmic (Billboard)	17

Chart performance for the remix version of "Throat Baby (Go Baby)"
Chart (2021)	Peak position
New Zealand Hot Singles (RMNZ)	29
US Rolling Stone Top 100	63

=== Year-end charts ===
Year-end chart performance for "Throat Baby (Go Baby)"
Chart (2021)	Position
US Billboard Hot 100	97
US Hot R&B/Hip-Hop Songs (Billboard)	39

== Certifications ==
Certifications for "Throat Baby (Go Baby)"
Region	Certification	Certified units/sales
United States (RIAA)	2× Platinum	2,000,000^{‡}
^{‡} Sales+streaming figures based on certification alone.
