= Man of My Word (Lil Baby and Lil Durk song) =

2021 song by Lil Baby and Lil Durk

Song by Lil Baby and Lil Durk

from the album The Voice of the Heroes
- Released: June 4, 2021
- Genre: Hip-hop
- Length: 2:52
- Label: Quality Control; 4PF; Only the Family; Alamo
- Songwriters: Dominique Jones; Durk Banks; Nile Bey; Roderick Hughey; Broderick Hughey
- Producers: Nile Waves; Iroc; DJ Young Pharaoh

"Man of My Word" is a song by American rappers Lil Baby and Lil Durk. It appears as the sixth track on their 2021 collaborative album The Voice of the Heroes.

== Background and release ==
"Man of My Word" is produced by Nile Waves, Iroc and DJ Young Pharaoh. It was released with the rest of The Voice of the Heroes on June 4, 2021. On its first day of release, the song reached number eight on Apple Music's Global chart and number nine on its US chart.

A music video for the song, directed by Caleb Jermale, was released on June 30, 2021. It shows Durk and Lil Baby driving through the city at night in a McLaren with a convoy of other vehicles, visiting a strip club, and appearing in CGI sequences involving shootouts and car crashes. BET wrote that the video was shot at Magic City and had drawn more than 12 million views on YouTube by August 2022.

== Certification ==
The song was certified gold by the Recording Industry Association of America (RIAA) in August 2022, one of six songs from The Voice of the Heroes to receive a gold certification alongside the album's platinum certification.

== Personnel ==
Credits adapted from the liner notes of The Voice of the Heroes.

- Lil Baby – vocals, songwriting
- Lil Durk – vocals, songwriting
- Nile Waves – production, songwriting
- Iroc – production, songwriting
- DJ Young Pharaoh – production

== Certifications ==
Certifications and sales
Region	Certification	Certified units/sales
United States (RIAA)	Gold	500,000^{‡}
^{*} Sales figures based on certification alone.^{^} Shipments figures based on certification alone.
