= All In (Lil Baby song) =

2020 song by Lil Baby

Single by Lil Baby

from the album My Turn
- Released: April 23, 2020
- Length: 2:36
- Label: Motown; Quality Control; Wolfpack
- Songwriters: Dominique Jones; Chris Rosser
- Producer: Quay Global

Lil Baby singles chronology
"Emotionally Scarred" (2020)	"All In" (2020)	"Prospect" (2020)

Music video
- "All In" on YouTube

"All In" is a song by American rapper Lil Baby, released for digital download on April 23, 2020 as the fourth single from his second studio album My Turn (2020), with an accompanying music video.

== Background ==
Lil Baby previewed the song on March 17, 2020, along with the announcement of his upcoming mixtape Lamborghini Boys. The song appears on the deluxe edition of My Turn, released in May.

== Music video ==
Released along with the single, the music video shows Lil Baby "cleaning his jewelry and flexing with his friends."

== Charts ==
Chart (2020)	Peak position
Canada (Canadian Hot 100)	84
US Billboard Hot 100	45
US Hot R&B/Hip-Hop Songs (Billboard)	20

== Certifications ==
Region	Certification	Certified units/sales
United States (RIAA)	Platinum	1,000,000^{‡}
^{‡} Sales+streaming figures based on certification alone.
