= Section 8 (music producer) =

African-American record producer

- Born: Rai'Shaun Devante Williams; Atlanta, Georgia
- Genres: Hip hop; trap
- Occupations: Record producer; songwriter
- Label: Warner Chappell Music

Rai'Shaun Devante Williams, known professionally as Section 8, is an American record producer. He is best known for his collaborations with American rapper Lil Baby, having produced his 2020 singles "We Paid" and "The Bigger Picture", both of which peaked within the top ten of the Billboard Hot 100. His contributions to Baby's album My Turn yielded two nominations—Best Rap Performance and Best Rap Song—at the 63rd Annual Grammy Awards. Following its release in June 2020, he debuted at number three on Billboard's Hot 100 Songwriters and Hot 100 Producers.

He has also produced Lil Baby's single "Errbody" which peaked at number 41 on the Billboard Hot 100. Urban magazine XXL named Williams one of the Best Hip Hop Producers of 2020, and one of the 18 "essential" hip hop producers the following year.

== Career ==
In August 2020, Section 8 was signed to an exclusive deal with Warner Chappell Music, who cited him as one of the "best young producers in the game".

== Production discography ==
Title	Artist	Album	Year
"Social Distancing"	Lil Baby	My Turn	2020
"Humble"	Lil Baby	My Turn	2020
"Get Money"	Lil Baby	My Turn	2020
"We Paid"	Lil Baby and 42 Dugg	My Turn	2020
"The Bigger Picture"	Lil Baby	My Turn	2020
"Errbody"	Lil Baby	non-album single	2020
"Send That Load"	Kevin Gates	Only the Generals, Pt. II	2021
"Alone" (featuring Lil Durk)	42 Dugg	Free Dem Boyz	2021
"How It Feels"	Lil Baby and Lil Durk	The Voice of the Heroes	2021
"If You Want To"	Lil Baby and Lil Durk	The Voice of the Heroes	2021
"Type Shit" (featuring Cardi B)	Migos	Culture III	2021
