= Feed My Lambs =

- Founded: 1990
- Type: Faith Based Early Education
- Purpose: Children, Education, & Love
- Location: Marietta, Georgia
- Website: http://www.feedmylambs.net/

Feed My Lambs, Inc. was a non-profit ministry located in Marietta, Georgia, United States, which operated tuition-free Christian preschools and grade schools for children living in impoverished areas of metro Atlanta, Georgia.

== History ==
Feed My Lambs opened its first school in Marietta in 1990, gaining its legal status as a non-profit organization in April 1992 and is overseen by a board of directors with eight members.

== Mission ==
The mission of Feed My Lambs is to impact children by opening preschools of excellence in high-risk communities in order to educate children and their families about the love of Christ. The schools are funded solely by donations from individuals, foundations, churches and businesses. Feed My Lambs transforms lives by nourishing children's minds, bodies, and spirits.

== Schools ==
At its peak, Feed My Lambs, Inc. operated 4 schools in the Metro-Atlanta Area serving approximately 200 children.
