= My Turn (Lil Baby album) =

Studio album by Lil Baby
- Released: February 28, 2020
- Studios: First Class Sounds; Patchwerk; Quality Control (Atlanta)
- Genre: Hip hop
- Length: 60:43
- Labels: Capitol; Motown; Wolfpack; Quality Control
- Producers: ATL Jacob; Budda Beats; Chi Chi; DJ Paul; Hit-Boy; Keanu Beats; Murda Beatz; Noah; Priority Beats; Quay Global; Section 8; Tay Keith; TWhy Xclusive; Twysted Genius; Tyler Armes; Wheezy; YoungTN

Lil Baby chronology
| Street Gossip (2018) | My Turn (2020) | The Voice of the Heroes (2021) |

Deluxe edition cover

Singles from My Turn
- 1. "Woah" Released: November 8, 2019; 2. "Sum 2 Prove" Released: January 9, 2020; 3. "Emotionally Scarred" Released: April 15, 2020; 4. "All In" Released: April 23, 2020; 5. "The Bigger Picture" Released: June 12, 2020

My Turn is the second studio album by American rapper Lil Baby. It was released on February 28, 2020, by Capitol Records, Motown Records, Wolfpack Music Group, and Quality Control Music. The album features guest appearances from Gunna, 42 Dugg, Future, Lil Uzi Vert, Lil Wayne, Moneybagg Yo, Young Thug, and Rylo Rodriguez. It also features production from record producers such as Tay Keith, Quay Global, Section 8, Twysted Genius, Hit-Boy, DJ Paul, Murda Beatz, and Wheezy, among others. The album was supported by five singles: "Woah", "Sum 2 Prove", "Emotionally Scarred", "All In", and "The Bigger Picture". The latter song received two Grammy nominations at the 2021 Grammy Awards.

My Turn received generally favorable reviews and debuted atop the US Billboard 200, earning 197,000 album-equivalent units, becoming Lil Baby's first US number-one album. The album topped the chart for five weeks, making it one of the best performing albums of 2020. It also reached the top 10 in other countries, including Canada and the United Kingdom. The album was certified seven-times platinum by the Recording Industry Association of America (RIAA) in February 2026. A deluxe edition, featuring six additional tracks, was released on May 1, 2020.

== Background ==
In October 2019, Lil Baby revealed plans to release his next studio album before the end of 2019, but was delayed until the following year. The album's artwork and release date were revealed in January 2020. Lil Baby took to Instagram Live and explained the album's title:

"I called it My Turn 'cause I feel like everybody else had a lil' turn. It's my turn now. Everybody dropped their mixtapes, their albums – go number 1, number 2, number 3"

== Promotion ==
=== Singles ===
The album's lead single, "Woah", was released for digital download on November 8, 2019. The song was produced by Quay Global. The music video was released on December 6, 2019. The song peaked at number 15 on the US Billboard Hot 100.

The album's second single, "Sum 2 Prove", was released on January 10, 2020. The song was produced by Twysted Genius. The music video was released on February 18, 2020. The song peaked at number 16 on the Billboard Hot 100.

"Emotionally Scarred" was serviced to rhythmic contemporary radio as the album's third single on April 15, 2020. The music video was released on April 30. The song peaked at number 31 on the Billboard Hot 100.

The album's fourth single, "All In", was released for digital download on April 23, 2020, as well an accompanying music video. The song peaked at number 45 on the Billboard Hot 100.

The album's fifth single, "The Bigger Picture", was released for digital download on June 12, 2020, as well an accompanying music video. The song peaked at number three on the Billboard Hot 100.

=== Promotional singles ===
The album's lead promotional single, "Catch the Sun", also from the Queen & Slim soundtrack, was released on November 15, 2019. The song was produced by Hit-Boy. The music video was released on January 29, 2020.

=== Other songs ===
A music video for the song, "Heatin Up" featuring frequent collaborator Gunna, was released on February 28, 2020, while the music video for "Forever" featuring Lil Wayne, was released on March 3, 2020. Both videos were directed by Jon J. The music video for "Grace" featuring 42 Dugg, was released on March 13, 2020. The music video for "No Sucker" featuring Moneybagg Yo, was released on April 10, 2020. The music video for "We Paid" featuring 42 Dugg, was released on May 6, 2020. The music video for "Forget That" featuring Rylo Rodriguez, was released on September 11, 2020.

== Artwork ==
The artwork features a pastoral painting that illustrates Lil Baby atop a large jutting rock, with water, baby goats and greenery surrounding him. He's shown lighting up cannabis, the smoke adding to the haziness of the artwork.

== Critical reception ==
Professional ratings
Aggregate scores
| Source | Rating |
|---|---|
| Metacritic | 66/100 |
Review scores
| Source | Rating |
| AllMusic | 3.5/5 stars |
| Exclaim! | 6/10 |
| HipHopDX | 3.8/5 |
| NME | 3/5 stars |
| Pitchfork | 6.6/10 |
| Rolling Stone | 3/5 stars |

My Turn was met with generally favorable reviews. At Metacritic, which assigns a normalized rating out of 100 to reviews from professional publications, the album received an average score of 66, based on five reviews.

AllMusic's critic Fred Thomas gave the album a positive review, praising Baby's vocal delivery as well as his flow on the album. Thomas further says that "Lil Baby manages to keep every moment fresh, finding a unique and unlikely midway between artistic inspiration and commercially viable entertainment". Writing for NME, Kyann-Sian Williams gave the album a mixed to positive review, praising many of the features on the album as well as Baby's delivery, although stating that the album "starts of a little slow and dreary". Furthermore, Williams said that the album "is an enjoyable collection of tracks for his loyal fans. He [Lil Baby] would do well, though, to stay away from the whiny sounds and rap with a little bit more clarity". Pitchfork's critic Sheldon Pearce had mixed opinions regarding the album, saying that "the music is all work and no inspiration". He implied that Baby's songwriting and lyricism has improved, but also stating that he "doesn't really have any charisma, or flavor, or personality".

A. Harmony of Exclaim! said, "The stuffed effort could be Lil Baby's attempt to showcase his growth. But one mark of artistic maturity is exercising restraint – less is often more". Writing for Rolling Stone, Danny Schwartz gave the album an overall mixed review, commending Baby's lyrical skills, saying "Baby's great strength is that he conveys emotion effortlessly; he doesn't need to formally unpack old traumas to bear them out". However, Schwartz mentioned that the "excessive length" of My Turn results in "a lot of filler" songs. Nonetheless, he described these songs as "premium grade".

=== Year-end lists ===
Select year-end rankings of My Turn
| Publication | List | Rank | Ref. |
|---|---|---|---|
| Billboard | The 50 Best Albums of 2020 | 6 | |
| Billboard | The 20 Best Rap Albums of 2020 | 1 | |
| Cleveland.com | Best Albums of 2020 | 36 | |
| Complex | The Best Albums of 2020 | 2 | |
| Noisey | The 100 Best Albums of 2020 | 7 | |
| NPR Music | The 50 Best Albums of 2020 | 30 | |
| Okayplayer | Okayplayer's Best Albums of 2020 | 9 | |
| Pitchfork | The 50 Best Albums of 2020 | 47 | |
| Slant Magazine | The 50 Best Albums of 2020 | 34 | |
| Slate | The Best Albums of 2020 | 10 | |
| Uproxx | The Best Albums of 2020 | 14 | |

=== Industry awards ===
Awards and nominations for My Turn
| Year | Ceremony | Category | Result | Ref. |
|---|---|---|---|---|
| 2020 | American Music Awards | Favorite Album – Rap/Hip-Hop | Nominated | |
| 2020 | BET Hip Hop Awards | Album of the Year | Nominated | |
| 2021 | Billboard Music Awards | Top Billboard 200 Album | Nominated | |
| 2021 | Billboard Music Awards | Top Rap Album | Nominated | |

== Commercial performance ==
My Turn debuted at number one on the US Billboard 200 with 197,000 album-equivalent units (including just under 10,000 pure album sales) in its first week, marking Lil Baby's first US number-one album. Following My Turn's first week of release, 12 songs off the album charted on the US Billboard Hot 100, which gave Lil Baby a career total of 47 songs on the chart, putting him at a tie with Prince and Paul McCartney. After logging 13 consecutive weeks in the top six, My Turn returned to number one on the Billboard 200, on the chart dated June 20, 2020. It stayed at the top spot for four additional weeks, topping the chart for five weeks in total. My Turn was the most consumed album of 2020 in the US, with 2.632 million album-equivalent units and 40,000 physical sales. On February 27, 2026, My Turn was certified seven-times platinum by the Recording Industry Association of America (RIAA) for combined sales and album-equivalent units of over seven million units in the United States.

== Track listing ==
My Turn track listing
| No. | Title | Writer(s) | Producer(s) | Length |
|---|---|---|---|---|
| 1. | "Get Ugly" | Dominique Jones; Jacob Canady | ATL Jacob | 2:35 |
| 2. | "Heatin Up" (with Gunna) | Jones; Sergio Kitchens; Chris Rosser | Quay Global | 2:57 |
| 3. | "How" | Jones; Shane Lindstrom | Murda Beatz | 3:01 |
| 4. | "Grace" (with 42 Dugg) | Jones; Dion Hayes; Zachary Thomas | Budda Beats | 3:23 |
| 5. | "Woah" | Jones; Rosser | Quay Global | 3:03 |
| 6. | "Live Off My Closet" (featuring Future) | Jones; Nayvadius Wilburn; Ashley Peck; Deundraeus Portis | Twysted Genius; Priority Beats | 2:53 |
| 7. | "Same Thing" | Jones; Brytavious Chambers; Jared Scharff | Tay Keith; Pearl Lion^{[a]} | 2:42 |
| 8. | "Emotionally Scarred" | Jones; Portis | Twysted Genius | 3:17 |
| 9. | "Commercial" (featuring Lil Uzi Vert) | Jones; Symere Woods; Keanu Torres; Chambers; Fabio Aguilar | Tay Keith; Keanu Beats; Aguilar^{[a]} | 3:34 |
| 10. | "Forever" (featuring Lil Wayne) | Jones; Dwayne Carter, Jr.; Portis | Twysted Genius | 3:21 |
| 11. | "Can't Explain" | Jones; Rosser | Quay Global | 3:01 |
| 12. | "No Sucker" (with Moneybagg Yo) | Jones; Demario White, Jr.; Chambers; Torres | Tay Keith; Keanu Beats^{[a]}; Fabio Aguilar^{[a]} | 3:08 |
| 13. | "Sum 2 Prove" | Jones; Portis | Twysted Genius | 3:25 |
| 14. | "We Should" (with Young Thug) | Jones; Jeffery Williams; Wesley Glass | Wheezy | 2:56 |
| 15. | "Catch the Sun" (from Queen & Slim: The Soundtrack) | Jones; Chauncey Hollis | Hit-Boy | 3:02 |
| 16. | "Consistent" | Jones; Rosser | Quay Global | 3:01 |
| 17. | "Gang Signs" | Jones; Paul Beauregard; Tim Moore | DJ Paul; TWhy Xclusive | 2:49 |
| 18. | "Hurtin" | Jones; Rosser | Quay Global | 2:43 |
| 19. | "Forget That" (with Rylo Rodriguez) | Jones; Ryan Adams; Lindstrom; Tyler Armes | Murda Beatz; Armes | 2:47 |
| 20. | "Solid" | Jones; Chidi Osondu; Hagan Lange | Chi Chi; Hagan^{[a]} | 3:05 |
| Total length: | | | | 60:43 |

Deluxe edition (bonus tracks)
| No. | Title | Writer(s) | Producer(s) | Length |
|---|---|---|---|---|
| 21. | "Social Distancing" | Jones; Rai'Shaun Williams; Osondu; Thanush Perinpanesan | Section 8; Chi Chi; YoungTN | 2:17 |
| 22. | "All In" | Jones; Rosser | Quay Global | 2:36 |
| 23. | "Low Down" | Jones; Rosser | Quay Global | 2:24 |
| 24. | "Humble" | Jones; R. Williams; Christopher Young; David Goldsmith | Section 8 | 3:11 |
| 25. | "Get Money" | Jones; R. Williams; Osondu; Noah Pettigrew | Section 8; Chi Chi; Noah | 2:47 |
| 26. | "We Paid" (with 42 Dugg) | Jones; Hayes; R. Williams | Section 8 | 3:01 |
| 27. | "The Bigger Picture" | Jones; R. Williams; Pettigrew | Section 8; Noah | 4:12 |
| Total length: | | | | 81:11 |

Notes

- ^{^[a]} signifies an uncredited co-producer

Sample credits

- "Heatin Up" contains an uncredited interpolation from "Hot", written by Jeffery Williams and Sergio Kitchens, as performed by Young Thug and Gunna.
- "Gang Signs" contains elements from "Throw Your Sets", written by Paul Beauregard, as performed by Three 6 Mafia.
- "Humble" contains a sample from "Up Against the Wind", written by Christopher Young and David Goldsmith, as performed by Lori Perry.

== Personnel ==
Credits adapted from the album's liner notes and Tidal.

- Matthew "Mattazik Muzik" Robinson – recording (all tracks)
- Todd Bergman – recording (track 15)
- Thomas "Tillie" Mann – mixing (all tracks)
- Stephen "DotCom" Farrow – mixing assistant (tracks 5, 6, 13)
- Princeton "Perfect Harmony" Terry – mixing assistant (tracks 1–19, 20)
- Chip Cannon – mixing assistant (tracks 1–4, 7–12, 14, 16–18, 20)
- Colin Leonard – mastering (tracks 1–14, 16–26)
- Ian Sefchick – mastering (track 15)

== Charts ==
=== Weekly charts ===
Chart performance for My Turn
| Chart (2020) | Peak position |
|---|---|
| Australian Albums (ARIA) | 20 |
| Austrian Albums (Ö3 Austria) | 27 |
| Belgian Albums (Ultratop Flanders) | 36 |
| Belgian Albums (Ultratop Wallonia) | 109 |
| Canadian Albums (Billboard) | 2 |
| Danish Albums (Hitlisten) | 25 |
| Dutch Albums (Album Top 100) | 14 |
| Estonian Albums (Eesti Tipp-40) | 33 |
| French Albums (SNEP) | 60 |
| German Albums (Offizielle Top 100) | 88 |
| Irish Albums (Official Charts) | 12 |
| Italian Albums (FIMI) | 54 |
| New Zealand Albums (RMNZ) | 19 |
| Norwegian Albums (VG-lista) | 14 |
| Swedish Albums (Sverigetopplistan) | 44 |
| Swiss Albums (Schweizer Hitparade) | 20 |
| UK Albums (Official Charts) | 6 |
| US Billboard 200 | 1 |
| US Top R&B/Hip-Hop Albums (Billboard) | 1 |

=== Year-end charts ===
2020 year-end chart performance for My Turn
| Chart (2020) | Position |
|---|---|
| Canadian Albums (Billboard) | 30 |
| US Billboard 200 | 2 |
| US Top R&B/Hip-Hop Albums (Billboard) | 2 |

2021 year-end chart performance for My Turn
| Chart (2021) | Position |
|---|---|
| Canadian Albums (Billboard) | 45 |
| US Billboard 200 | 10 |
| US Top R&B/Hip-Hop Albums (Billboard) | 4 |

2022 year-end chart performance for My Turn
| Chart (2022) | Position |
|---|---|
| US Billboard 200 | 16 |
| US Top R&B/Hip-Hop Albums (Billboard) | 7 |

2023 year-end chart performance for My Turn
| Chart (2023) | Position |
|---|---|
| US Billboard 200 | 24 |
| US Top R&B/Hip-Hop Albums (Billboard) | 8 |

2024 year-end chart performance for My Turn
| Chart (2024) | Position |
|---|---|
| US Billboard 200 | 44 |
| US Top R&B/Hip-Hop Albums (Billboard) | 13 |

2025 year-end chart performance for My Turn
| Chart (2025) | Position |
|---|---|
| US Billboard 200 | 74 |
| US Top R&B/Hip-Hop Albums (Billboard) | 23 |

== Certifications ==
Certifications for My Turn
| Region | Certification | Certified units/sales |
|---|---|---|
| Denmark (IFPI Danmark) | Gold | 10,000^{‡} |
| United Kingdom (BPI) | Platinum | 300,000^{‡} |
| United States (RIAA) | 7× Platinum | 7,000,000^{‡} |
^{‡} Sales+streaming figures based on certification alone.

== Release history ==
Release dates and formats for My Turn
| Region | Date | Label(s) | Format(s) | Edition | Ref. |
|---|---|---|---|---|---|
| Various | February 28, 2020 | Capitol; Motown; Wolfpack; Quality Control | CD; digital download; streaming | Standard | |
| Various | May 1, 2020 | Capitol; Motown; Wolfpack; Quality Control | Digital download; streaming | Deluxe | |
| Various | June 12, 2020 | Capitol; Motown; Wolfpack; Quality Control | Vinyl | Standard | |
