= Money Man =

American rapper (born 1986)

- Money Man in 2018

Background information
- Born: Tysen Jay Bolding The Bronx, New York City, U.S.
- Origin: Atlanta, Georgia, U.S.
- Genres: Southern hip-hop; trap
- Occupations: Rapper; songwriter
- Years active: 2012–present
- Labels: Black Circle; Empire; Cash Money; Republic
- Formerly of: Rich Gang

Tysen Jay Bolding, known professionally as Money Man, is an American rapper from Atlanta, Georgia. His Kobe Bryant-inspired 2020 single "24" peaked at number 49 on the Billboard Hot 100 and preceded his eighteenth mixtape, Epidemic (2020). His mixtape, Red Eye (2023), remains his highest-charting entry on the Billboard 200.

== Career ==
After the success of his 2016 songs "Boss Up" and "How It Feel" and his Black Circle mixtape trilogy, Bolding signed with Cash Money Records and Republic Records in 2017, and released the Secret Society, Harvest Season and Grow God mixtapes before he bought out his contract in 2018.

In 2019, Money Man released his mixtape Paranoia, which peaked at number 36 on the Billboard 200 album chart, followed by another successful project, the collaborative mixtape Long Money, with Peewee Longway. In 2020, Money Man released Epidemic and State of Emergency, mixtapes alluding to the COVID-19 outbreak, the former containing the single "24", which later saw a remix being released with Lil Baby.

== Discography ==
=== Mixtapes ===
List of mixtapes, with selected album details.
Title	Details	Peak chart positions	Certifications
Title	Details	US	Certifications
Black Circle	Released: January 18, 2016; Label: Self-released	—	
Black Circle 2	Released: September 19, 2016; Label: Self-released	—	
Black Circle Friday	Released: November 25, 2016; Label: Self-released	—	
Money Over Everything (with Veezo Da Shooter)	Released: June 18, 2017; Label: Self-released	—	
Secret Society	Released: July 22, 2017; Label: Cash Money, Republic	—	
24 Hours	Released: September 25, 2017; Label: Empire	—	
Harvest Season	Released: October 19, 2017; Label: Cash Money, Republic	—	
Grow God	Released: January 11, 2018; Label: Cash Money, Republic	—	
6 Hours	Released: February 13, 2018; Label: Empire	—	
6 Hours 2	Released: June 17, 2018; Label: Empire	—	
Nameless	Released: September 3, 2018; Label: Empire	—	
No Promo	Released: September 20, 2018; Label: Empire	—	
TraumaMan (with Trauma Tone)	Released: September 26, 2018; Label: Empire	—	
Winter	Released: December 21, 2018; Label: Empire	—	
Paranoia	Released: May 24, 2019; Label: Empire	36	
Area 51	Released: September 20, 2019; Label: Empire	—	
Long Money (with Peewee Longway)	Released: October 4, 2019; Label: Empire	45	
Epidemic	Released: March 2, 2020; Label: Empire	24	RIAA: Gold
State of Emergency	Released: March 20, 2020; Label: Empire	56	
Blockchain	Released: November 12, 2021; Label: Empire	13	
Whale Games	Released: April 29, 2022; Label: Empire	—	
Big Money	Released: June 24, 2022; Label: Empire	95	
Blackout	Released: October 28, 2022; Label: Empire	168	
Red Eye	Released: March 17, 2023; Label: Empire	93	
Purple Heart	Released: February 14, 2024; Label: Empire	—	
Insomnia	Released: March 21, 2025; Label: Empire	—	

=== Singles ===
List of singles, showing selected chart positions, year released and album name
Title	Year	Peak chart positions					Certifications	Album
Title	Year	US	US R&B/HH	US Rap	CAN	GRE	Certifications	Album
"Ooowwweee" (with Peewee Longway)	2019	—	—	—	—	—		Long Money
"Courtesy"	2020	—	—	—	—	—		Epidemic
"24" (solo or remix featuring Lil Baby)	2020	49	17	16	45	3	RIAA: 3× Platinum; BPI: Silver	Epidemic
"LLC" (solo or remix featuring Moneybagg Yo)	2021	— (Note: "LLC" did not enter the Billboard Hot 100, but peaked at number 10 on the Bubbling Under Hot 100 chart.)	42	25	—	—	RIAA: Gold	Blockchain
"Tip Off"	2021	—	—	—	—	—		non-album single

=== Guest appearances ===
List of non-single guest appearances, with other performing artists, showing year released and album name
Title	Year	Other artist(s)	Album
"American Dream"	2012	Sy Ari Da Kid, K Camp	Work A Holics
"Lose My Mind"	2016	Blacc Zacc	Dirty World
"Changed On Me"	2017	Trae tha Truth	—N/a
"She Wanna Ride"	2017	Spacejam Bo	Cote Kid
"Typical"	2017	K Camp, Moneybagg Yo	Slum Lords 2
"Chances"	2017	Sy Ari Da Kid	2 Soon
"Phase Me"	2017	Drugrixh Peso	Drugrixh II
"Reason"	2017	Ripp Flamez	Project Melodies 2
"Work Of Art"	2017	RaRa	Dope Sell Itself
"Above The Rim"	2017	DaBaby	Back On My Baby Jesus Sh!t
"Shop With Me"	2017	Yella Beezy	Oak Cliff America Vol. 1: Broke Nights Rich Days
"Shooters"	2017	Super Nard	All Eyes On Me
"Yeen Special"	2017	Made Men	Made 4 It
"Colors (Remix)"	2017	Lil Lonnie, Blac Youngsta	Visions
"Shooter"	2018	Trae tha Truth	Hometown Hero
"Straight to the Money"	2018	Celly Ru, Lex Aura, Mozzy, Trae tha Truth	Foeva East 3
"Knot"	2018	Q Money	Neva Had Shit
"Handle Bars (Remix)"	2018	Mauri Corey	For the Win
"Shooter"	2018	Yung Ruler	Death B4 Dishonor
"Make It Work (Remix)"	2018	DJ Genius, Felipe	A '98 Story
"Sauce All On Me (Remix)"	2019	Coca Vango, Nard & B, Derez DeShon	Mr. Vango
"Dead Fresh (Remix)"	2019	Philthy Rich, T.E.C.	The Remixes 3
"Road Runnin'"	2019	Lil Pete	Hardaway
"Heart Colder"	2020	Philthy Rich	Hometown Hero
