= 24 (Money Man song) =

2020 single by Money Man

Single by Money Man

from the album Epidemic
- Released: February 21, 2020
- Length: 2:40
- Label: Empire
- Songwriters: Tysen Bolding; Nicolas Michetti; Nick Pullens
- Producers: Nflated; ProdByNicky

Money Man singles chronology
| "Area 51" (2020) | "24" (2020) | "Stay Down" (2020) |

Audio video
- "24" on YouTube

"24" is a song by American rapper Money Man. It was released on February 21, 2020 as a single from his eighteenth mixtape, Epidemic. A remix version featuring Lil Baby was released on August 14, 2020. Both versions and the song's title itself serve as tributes to basketball player Kobe Bryant, who died in a helicopter crash, alongside his young daughter, in January 2020.

== Composition ==
The bass-heavy track starts off with Money Man paying his respect to Kobe Bryant. He further "flexes his status as an independent artist", accentuating his "lavish" lifestyle, including the diamonds on his chains and the expensive cars he rides around. Aron A. of HotNewHipHop gave the song a HOTTTTT rating and said: "The rapper's hustler's mentality informs each bar he spits. It could be a light flex or a moment of introspection but Money Man drops jewels and gems throughout his music".

== Remix ==
"24 (Remix)"

Single by Money Man featuring Lil Baby

from the album Epidemic (Deluxe)
- Released: August 14, 2020
- Genre: Hip hop; trap
- Length: 3:02
- Label: Empire
- Songwriters: Tysen Bolding; Dominique Jones; Nicolas Michetti; Nick Pullens
- Producers: Nflated; ProdByNicky

Money Man singles chronology
| "Wraith" (2020) | "24 (Remix)" (2020) | "Amazon" (2020) |

Lil Baby singles chronology
| "She Know" (2020) | "24 (Remix)" (2020) | "Why Do You Lie to Me" (2020) |

Audio video
- "24 (Remix)" on YouTube

The official "24" remix with Lil Baby was released on August 14, 2020 and included on the deluxe edition of Money Man's Epidemic, released a week later.

=== Composition ===
"In practice, it sounds like a torrent of syllables and metaphors delivered in quick succession. Imagine someone trying to read a phonebook's worth of flexes through an Auto-Tuned gargle in the fastest amount of time possible, and one can begin to picture what makes '24' so amazing. To his credit, Lil Baby effortlessly matches Money Man's energy, with a verse that operates like a victory lap".

— Charles Holmes of Rolling Stone describing the rapper's' flows.

As with the original, the duo pay homage to Kobe Bryant over a "tantalizing", "muddy" bass and a "twangy" guitar loop. They also make references footballer Joe Flacco and rapper Pop Smoke.

=== Critical reception ===
Rolling Stone's Charles Holmes praised the rappers for having "the flow of the year", and stated "their total disregard for decorum in favor of showing off one's preternatural lyrical abilities is weirdly the most fitting tribute one could give to Bryant". HotNewHipHop's Aron A. said "It's a glorious occasion when two certified hustlers team up on wax", appraising the collaboration: "Money Man's deep rich vocals glide on the production with gems from the mind of a hustler before Lil Baby comes through to keep his hot streak going in 2020 with yet another show-stealing verse".

=== Cover art ===
The cover art features black mamba snakes in the form of basketballs with the number 24 on one of the snakes. "Black Mamba" was Kobe Bryant's nickname and the "24" is the number he wore during his Hall of Fame career with the Los Angeles Lakers.

== Charts ==
=== Weekly charts ===
Chart performance for "24" Remix
| Chart (2020) | Peak position |
|---|---|
| Canada Hot 100 (Billboard) | 45 |
| Greece (IFPI) | 3 |
| US Billboard Hot 100 | 49 |
| US Hot R&B/Hip-Hop Songs (Billboard) | 17 |
| US Rolling Stone Top 100 | 26 |

=== Year-end charts ===
Year-end chart performance for "24" Remix
| Chart (2020) | Position |
|---|---|
| US Hot R&B/Hip-Hop Songs (Billboard) | 82 |

== Certifications ==
Certifications for "24"
| Region | Certification | Certified units/sales |
|---|---|---|
| United Kingdom (BPI) | Silver | 200,000^{‡} |
| United States (RIAA) for Remix | 3× Platinum | 3,000,000^{‡} |
^{‡} Sales+streaming figures based on certification alone.
