= BRS Kash =

American rapper (born 1993)

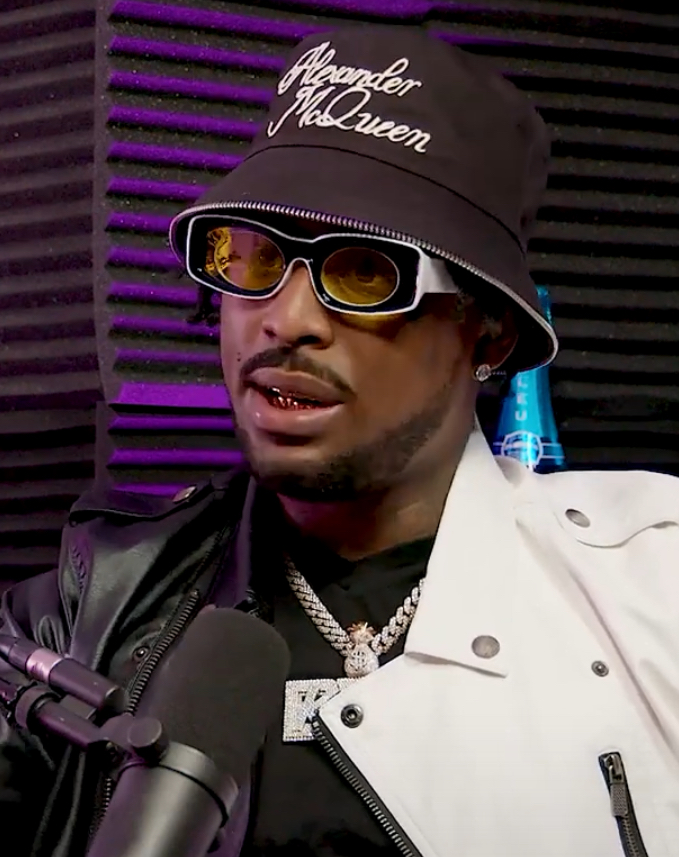
- BRS Kash in 2023

Background information
- Born: Kenneth Duncan Jr. May 15, 1993 (age 33); Atlanta, Georgia, U.S.
- Genres: Southern hip-hop; trap
- Occupations: Rapper; singer; songwriter
- Labels: Love Renaissance; Interscope; Team Litty

Kenneth Duncan Jr. (born May 15, 1993), known professionally as BRS Kash, is an American rapper from Atlanta, Georgia. He is best known for his 2020 debut single "Throat Baby (Go Baby)", which peaked at number 24 on the Billboard Hot 100, received double platinum certification by the Recording Industry Association of America (RIAA), and spawned a remix featuring City Girls and DaBaby. Originally released in 2019, the song gained virality on TikTok the following year, prompting Love Renaissance (LVRN) and Interscope Records to sign the rapper.

== Early life ==
Duncan grew up in Atlanta listening to hip hop artists like Kilo Ali, Raheem the Dream, and Outkast.

== Career ==
On November 22, 2019, BRS Kash released his first single "Throat Baby (Go Baby)". The single broke out in 2020 going viral on TikTok. In August 2020, it was announced he signed with Love Renaissance and Interscope Records. The single charted in the top 10 on the Billboard Hot R&B/Hip-Hop Songs Chart. On January 22, 2021, BRS Kash released his debut mixtape Kash Only, including the remix of "Throat Baby (Go Baby)" featuring DaBaby and City Girls.

== Personal life ==
Duncan supported Jon Ossoff and Raphael Warnock in the 2020 United States Senate elections, performing at a rally for both in 2020.

== Discography ==
=== Mixtapes ===
List of albums, with selected details
Title	Album details	Peak chart positions
Title	Album details	US
Kash Only	Released: January 22, 2021; Label: LVRN, Interscope, Team Litty; Format: CD, digital download, streaming	98

=== Singles ===
Title	Year	Peak chart positions			Certifications	Album
Title	Year	US	US R&B /HH	US Rhy.	Certifications	Album
"Throat Baby (Go Baby)" (solo or remix with DaBaby and City Girls)	2020	24	10	24	RIAA: 2× Platinum	Kash Only
"Kash App" (featuring Latto)	2021	—	—	33		Kash Only
"Oh No (Madden NFL Version)"	2021	—	—	—		Madden NFL 22
"Oh No"	2021	—	—	—		Non-album singles
"I'm Hot"	2021	—	—	—		Non-album singles
"Spend It"	2021	—	—	—		Non-album singles
"RBS (Rish Bish Shit)"	2022	—	—	—		Non-album singles
"Let Me In"	2022	—	—	—		Non-album singles
"New Money"	2022	—	—	—		Non-album singles
