= Emotionally Scarred =

Single by Lil Baby

from the album My Turn
- Released: April 15, 2020
- Length: 3:18
- Label: Motown; Quality Control
- Songwriters: Dominique Jones; Deundraeus Portis
- Producer: Twysted Genius

Lil Baby singles chronology
"Sum 2 Prove" (2020)	"Emotionally Scarred" (2020)	"All In" (2020)

"Emotionally Scarred" is a song by American rapper Lil Baby. It was released as the third single from his album My Turn on April 15, 2020. The track peaked at number 31 on the Billboard Hot 100.

== Background ==
On the track, Lil Baby was a 13 year old and he talked about his emotional trauma, lack of trust in relationships, his shortcomings as a human and his current position in the new-school rap game.

== Music video ==
A music video for the track was released on April 30, 2020. The video was directed by Keemotion.

== Remix ==
Rapper NLE Choppa released a remix to the track, titled "Different Day", on May 24, 2020.

== Live performance ==
Lil Baby performed the song live for Vevo on March 5, 2020.

Lil Baby performed the song live on January 30, 2025 at Intuit Dome in Inglewood, California for FireAid to help with relief efforts for the January 2025 Southern California wildfires.

== Charts ==
=== Weekly charts ===
Chart (2020)	Peak position
Canada (Canadian Hot 100)	85
UK Singles (Official Charts Company)	78
US Billboard Hot 100	31
US Hot R&B/Hip-Hop Songs (Billboard)	16
US Rhythmic Airplay (Billboard)	5
US Rolling Stone Top 100	12

=== Year-end charts ===
Chart (2020)	Position
US Billboard Hot 100	74
US Hot R&B/Hip-Hop Songs (Billboard)	30
US Rhythmic (Billboard)	28

== Certifications ==
Region	Certification	Certified units/sales
United Kingdom (BPI)	Gold	400,000^{‡}
United States (RIAA)	7× Platinum	7,000,000^{‡}
^{‡} Sales+streaming figures based on certification alone.
