= The Bigger Picture (song) =

2020 protest song by Lil Baby

Single by Lil Baby

from the album My Turn (Deluxe)
- Released: June 12, 2020
- Recorded: 2020
- Genre: Political hip hop; trap
- Length: 4:13
- Label: Quality Control; Universal
- Songwriters: Dominique Jones; Rai'Shaun Williams; Noah Pettigrew
- Producers: Section 8; Noah

Lil Baby singles chronology
"Code of tha Streets" (2020)	"The Bigger Picture" (2020)	"One Shot" (2020)

Music video
- "The Bigger Picture" on YouTube

"The Bigger Picture" is a protest song by American rapper Lil Baby. It was released on June 12, 2020, in the wake of the murder of George Floyd. In the song, Lil Baby shows solidarity with the 2020 Black Lives Matter protests calling for justice against police brutality in the United States and systemic racism. Proceeds from "The Bigger Picture" benefit The National Association of Black Journalists, Breonna Taylor's attorney, The Bail Project, and Black Lives Matter.

It is Lil Baby's highest-charting song as a solo artist on the Billboard Hot 100, debuting and peaking at number three, behind "Trollz" by 6ix9ine & Nicki Minaj and "Rockstar" by DaBaby & Roddy Ricch. It was later added to the deluxe edition of his second studio album My Turn. The song received two nominations at the 63rd Annual Grammy Awards: Best Rap Performance and Best Rap Song.

== Background ==
Prior to the song's release, Lil Baby was seen marching down Mitchell Street in his hometown Atlanta, during the George Floyd protests in Georgia. Lil Baby attended the march in his hometown to actively protest and bear witness with his own eyes, which later inspired him and his team to film the song's music video right there. He was accompanied by the city's Councilman Antonio Brown.

== Composition and lyrics ==
The song was written by Lil Baby, alongside its producers, Section 8, (who also produced Lil Baby's "We Paid") and Noah Pettigrew. It begins with morose keys, a soundbite taken from the news detailing the George Floyd protest in Minneapolis, and chants from Black Lives Matter protesters, chanting "I can't breathe". Lil Baby then starts rapping, venting over a hard, clicking drum clap and a dramatic and "haunting" piano riff. Riley Runnels of Paper noted "The chorus dictates what protestors are fighting for is 'bigger than Black and White'. It's deep-rooted, it's systemic and it's going to require a lot of time to change". The ‘bigger than Black and White’ lyrics address deeper racial matters that influence how minority groups are treated in society, touching on topics such as police brutality, opportunities to access employment, the quality of education, violence and crime in our communities, and the system of healthcare. However, Lil Baby continues with optimism, rapping "But we gotta start somewhere". With the line, "Corrupted police been the problem where I'm from, but I'd be lying if I said it was all of them", Lil Baby references the heated sentiment that all police officers are racist oppressors ("All Cops Are Bad" or A.C.A.B.).

Charles Holmes of Rolling Stone summarized the song and its concept:

Baby raps like a torrent, sprinting across the beat as he tries to come to grips with the weeks-long protests calling for justice after the deaths of George Floyd, Breonna Taylor, Ahmaud Arbery, and countless others. In verse, he's both angry and confused — 'I find it crazy the police will shoot you and know that you dead but still tell you to freeze' — trying to make sense of what millions of Americans are struggling to come to grips with. But of all the feelings Lil Baby exorcises on the track, it's trepidation and fear that colors 'The Bigger Picture'.

== Critical reception ==
"The Bigger Picture" received critical acclaim. Riley Wallace of HipHopDX called the song and video "powerful" and appraised it as "a protest anthem that manages to strike even more poignantly by not inherently branding itself as such". Riley concluded that Lil Baby seamlessly articulates "the frustration, confusion, and innate call to stand up for something much bigger than himself". Miki Hellerbach of Euphoria magazine opined that "while Kendrick Lamar's voice was the sound of the Mike Brown/Eric Garner/Freddie Gray protests with his song 'Alright', it seems clear why Lil Baby is the sound of now". Hellerbach stated Lil Baby seems to center and ignite the listener simultaneously, and "in the hook, he raps poignantly through his vulnerability and motivation": "It's a problem with the whole way of life/ It can't change overnight, but we gotta start somewhere/ Might as well gone 'head start here".

In a highly positive review, Charles Holmes of Rolling Stone said "The Bigger Picture" "isn't a protest song, it's a song shaped by protest", praising Lil Baby's storytelling skills: "Baby's main talent has always been his avoidance of obfuscation in favor of a direct address". Tom Breihan of Stereogum deemed it "a stirring and ultimately optimistic song", and said he "honestly found it pretty moving". Billboard's Jason Lipshutz deemed it "the biggest modern protest song".

== Cover art ==
The song's cover art is a picture taken at a George Floyd protest in Atlanta on June 8, 2020, where Lil Baby led a crowd on a bicycle. The photo was taken by photographer Matthew Geovany

== Commercial performance ==
On its first day of release, "The Bigger Picture" reached number-one on both the US and global Apple Music charts, while reaching number three on US Spotify. "The Bigger Picture" debuted at number three on the US Billboard Hot 100, becoming Lil Baby's highest-charting song as a lead artist, surpassing "Drip Too Hard", which peaked at number four in 2018.

== Music video ==
The video was released on the same day as the song and takes place at the Black Lives Matter protest in Lil Baby's hometown of Atlanta. The video shows Lil Baby standing among other protesters, raising his hand in solidarity and wearing a Black Lives Matter t-shirt. It also features footage of the nationwide protests from the previous two weeks that followed the murder of George Floyd, an African American man murdered by a police officer.

== Charts ==
=== Weekly charts ===
Weekly chart performance for "The Bigger Picture"
Chart (2020)	Peak position
Canada Hot 100 (Billboard)	18
Ireland (IRMA)	65
New Zealand Hot Singles (RMNZ)	8
UK Singles (Official Charts)	54
US Billboard Hot 100	3
US Hot R&B/Hip-Hop Songs (Billboard)	3
US Rhythmic Airplay (Billboard)	32
US Rolling Stone Top 100	1

=== Year-end charts ===
2020 year-end chart performance for "The Bigger Picture"
Chart (2020)	Position
US Billboard Hot 100	76
US Hot R&B/Hip-Hop Songs (Billboard)	36

== Certifications ==
Certifications for "The Bigger Picture"
Region	Certification	Certified units/sales
United States (RIAA)	2× Platinum	2,000,000^{‡}
^{‡} Sales+streaming figures based on certification alone.

== See also ==
- "Otherside of America", a song by Meek Mill, also released in June 2020, and associated with Black Lives Matter and George Floyd
