= StaySolidRocky =

American rapper, singer, and songwriter (born 2001)

- Born: Darak Kings Figueroa; August 6, 2001 (age 25); Mosby Court, Richmond, Virginia, U.S.
- Genres: Hip hop; trap
- Occupations: Rapper; singer; songwriter
- Instrument: Vocals
- Years active: 2016–present
- Label: Columbia

Darak Kings Figueroa (born August 6, 2001), professionally known as StaySolidRocky, is an American rapper, singer, and songwriter. Born in Richmond, Virginia, Figueroa lived in San Antonio, Texas for a few years before moving back to his hometown. He rose to fame in 2020 with his single "Party Girl", which peaked at number 21 on the Billboard Hot 100.

== Early life ==
Figueroa was born in Mosby Court. His father is of Puerto Rican descent. He was raised by his mother, a former rapper herself. He started expressing an interest in music when he moved in with his father. He attended high school in native or Richmond, he began freestyling and started using his Instagram platform to share snippets of music he had been working on. He soon began building a fanbase on Instagram.

== Career ==
Figueroa started to gain popularity after he released the music video for his single "Party Girl" in December 2019. The track sat at 2 million views on YouTube before it went viral on the video-sharing platform TikTok, which propelled Figueroa to stardom. He got involved with Solomon Sobande, the former manager of XXXTentacion, and shortly afterwards, he signed a deal with Columbia Records. His debut EP, Fallin' was released on July 17, 2020. The 7-track EP included "Party Girl".

On September 7, 2022, Figueroa was arrested by the Georgia State Patrol in Atlanta, Georgia for allegedly being involved in a drive-by shooting at a funeral service in Virginia.

== Influences ==
Growing up, Figueroa listened to Bone Thugs-n-Harmony and Lil Wayne. As he started making his own musical songs, he began listening to NBA Youngboy, Kevin Gates and Kodak Black.

== Discography ==
=== Extended plays ===
Title	EP details	Peak chart positions			
Title	EP details	US	US R&B/HH	CAN	FIN
Fallin'	Released: July 17, 2020; Label: Columbia; Format: Digital download, streaming	65	38	53	25
Why So Larceny?	Released: August 5, 2022; Label: Self-released; Format: Digital download, streaming	—	—	—	—

=== Singles ===
Title	Year	Peak chart positions										Certifications	Album
Title	Year	US	US R&B/HH	AUS	AUT	CAN	IRE	NZ	SWE	SWI	UK	Certifications	Album
"Soft Aggression"	2020	—	—	—	—	—	—	—	—	—	—		Fallin'
"Toxic"	2020	—	—	—	—	—	—	—	—	—	—		Fallin'
"Party Girl" (solo or remix featuring Lil Uzi Vert)	2020	21	11	19	43	15	10	21	34	36	13	RIAA: 4× Platinum; ARIA: Platinum; BPI: Platinum; IFPI SWI: Gold; MC: 2× Platinum; RMNZ: 2× Platinum	Fallin'
"Vacant Heart" (featuring Big4Keezy)	2020	—	—	—	—	—	—	—	—	—	—		Fallin'
"Party" (YoungBoy Choppa featuring StaySolidRocky)	2020	—	—	—	—	—	—	—	—	—	—		Non-album singles
"Demons"	2020	—	—	—	—	—	—	—	—	—	—		Non-album singles
"—" denotes a recording that did not chart or was not released in that territory.
