= Woah (song) =

2019 single by Lil Baby

Single by Lil Baby

from the album My Turn
- Released: November 8, 2019
- Genre: Trap
- Length: 3:03
- Label: Quality Control; Universal
- Songwriters: Dominique Jones; Chris Rosser
- Producer: Quay Global

Lil Baby singles chronology
"Down Like That" (2019)	"Woah" (2019)	"Highest in the Room" (remix) (2020)

Music video
- "Woah" on YouTube

"Woah" is a song by American rapper Lil Baby. Written alongside producer Quay Global, the song was released through Quality Control Music and Universal Music Group on November 8, 2019, as the lead single from his second studio album My Turn (2020). "Woah" became Lil Baby's third number one on the Billboard Streaming Songs chart, following 2018's "Yes Indeed" and "Drip Too Hard". It also debuted at number one on the Rolling Stone 100.

== Background ==
On November 1, 2019, Lil Baby posted a preview of the single on the app Triller. The dance move he displayed during the clip was described as hitting "The Woah". The song marked his first release as a solo artist since "Back On".

== Critical reception ==
Dewayne Gage of Rolling Stone explained that the song, as being "built on a bed of heavy hitting 808s and suspenseful piano", enables the rapper to perform "with a canvas to sing and stretch his vocals as he describes how far he's come since embarking on a full-time rap career only two years ago". Tom Breihan at Stereogum thought that the song is "a fairly standard Atlanta trap song". However, the rapper "has a way with a hook, and there's something hypnotic about the way he settles into that misspelled title word".

== Commercial performance ==
Following its release, "Woah" reached number 1 on Apple Music within 24 hours. The song debuted at number 19 on the Billboard Hot 100. On the Rolling Stone Top 100 Songs chart, the song debuted at number one, making it the sixth song to do so, eleventh overall, and became Lil Baby's first number one song in the United States.

== Music video ==
The song's official video was released on December 6, 2019. In it, Lil Baby is seen with "exotic cars drifting all around him". He performs a series of dances, including the song's namesake dance challenge, the Woah. The video features cameos from fellow rappers Lil Durk and Lil Marlo, as well as members of Lil Baby's family. Billboard's Michael Saponara called the visuals "energetic".

== Live performances ==
Lil Baby performed the song on The Tonight Show Starring Jimmy Fallon on January 6, 2020.

== Charts ==
=== Weekly charts ===
Chart (2019–2020)	Peak position
Canada (Canadian Hot 100)	28
Ireland (IRMA)	93
New Zealand Hot Singles (RMNZ)	18
Portugal (AFP)	113
UK Singles (OCC)	66
US Billboard Hot 100	15
US Hot R&B/Hip-Hop Songs (Billboard)	7
US Rhythmic (Billboard)	6
US Rolling Stone Top 100	1

=== Year-end charts ===
Chart (2020)	Position
Canada (Canadian Hot 100)	79
US Billboard Hot 100	42
US Hot R&B/Hip-Hop Songs (Billboard)	19
US Rhythmic (Billboard)	34

== Certifications ==
Region	Certification	Certified units/sales
Brazil (Pro-Música Brasil)	Gold	20,000^{‡}
United Kingdom (BPI)	Silver	200,000^{‡}
United States (RIAA)	5× Platinum	5,000,000^{‡}
^{‡} Sales+streaming figures based on certification alone.
