= Party Girl (StaySolidRocky song) =

2020 single by StaySolidRocky

Single by StaySolidRocky

from the EP Fallin'
- Published: September 12, 2019
- Released: April 21, 2020
- Recorded: 2019
- Genre: Emo rap
- Length: 2:27
- Label: Columbia
- Songwriters: Darak Figeroua; Edgar Bustios
- Producer: Nashi

StaySolidRocky singles chronology
"Soft Aggression" (2020)	"Party Girl" (2020)	"Vacant Heart" (2020)

Music video
- "Party Girl" on YouTube

"Party Girl" is a song by American rapper StaySolidRocky, originally self-released on September 12, 2019, and then re-released by Columbia Records on April 21, 2020, as his third career-single. The song went viral on video-sharing app TikTok and became StaySolidRocky's first charting single. It was written by the rapper and its producer Nashi. The track was later included on his debut EP Fallin', released July 17, 2020. A remix with rapper Lil Uzi Vert was released on July 10, 2020.

== Background ==
StaySolidRocky first previewed the song in an Instagram post on July 10, 2019. The track was met with positive feedback, which prompted the rapper to record the song at a friend's house, whereafter it was uploaded to SoundCloud. Rocky also recorded a music video, financed by himself. The song soon gained popularity on video-sharing app TikTok, whereafter it amassed millions of views on YouTube. Although "Party Girl" was originally released in September 2019, after being recorded at a friend's house, the song was officially re-released on April 21, 2020, after StaySolidRocky secured a recording deal with Columbia Records in early 2020.

== Composition ==
StaySolidRocky wrote the song in July 2019. It is loosely based on a relationship he had. Conceptually, "Party Girl" is a "love-drunk" track, finding the rapper "fishing for romance with a rowdy partygoer". The song contains "somber" keys with, as described by Billboard's Carl Lamarre, "IG caption-worthy lyrics like, 'They say you ain't wifey type, but I don't care I want you'". The song also references Cyndi Lauper's "Girls Just Want To Have Fun".

== Critical reception ==
Carl Lamarre of Billboard opined that, lyrically, the song raised StaySolidRocky's profile - "as not only a lovestruck teen but a promising hitmaker".

== Commercial performance ==
The song gained traction in April 2020, and a month later it was added to various Spotify playlists, aiding in its streams going from thousands to millions. In the week ending April 30, 2020, "Party Girl" debuted at number 84 on the Billboard Hot 100, thanks to 8.2 million streams the previous week. It has since peaked at number 21.

== Music video ==
The music video, which StaySolidRocky financed himself, was shot in December 2019. He recalled: "I was aiming for like 50 thousand views 'cause that was my first music video. That was the first music video I ever did".

== TikTok dance ==
Over 8 million videos have been made on TikTok using the song as of June 2020, with over 3 billion plays. Popular TikTok users like Charli D'Amelio, who at the time was the most-followed individual on the platform, helped to popularize the song on the platform. These videos usually consist of users dancing to a snippet of the song. It was the second top TikTok song for May 2020.

== Charts ==
=== Weekly charts ===
Chart (2020)	Peak position
Argentina (Argentina Hot 100)	64
Australia (ARIA)	19
Austria (Ö3 Austria Top 40)	43
Belgium (Ultratop 50 Flanders)	44
Belgium (Ultratip Bubbling Under Wallonia)	3
Canada (Canadian Hot 100)	15
Czech Republic Singles Digital (ČNS IFPI)	30
Denmark (Tracklisten)	22
Estonia (Eesti Tipp-40)	33
France (SNEP)	103
Germany (GfK)	61
Greece International (IFPI)	20
Hungary (Stream Top 40)	15
Iceland (Tónlistinn)	35
Ireland (IRMA)	10
Italy (FIMI)	98
Lithuania (AGATA)	34
Netherlands (Dutch Top 40)	81
Netherlands (Single Top 100)	36
New Zealand (RMNZ)	21
Norway (VG-lista)	31
Portugal (AFP)	9
Scotland Singles (OCC)	68
Slovakia Singles Digital (ČNS IFPI)	36
Sweden (Sverigetopplistan)	34
Switzerland (Schweizer Hitparade)	36
UK Singles (OCC)	13
US Billboard Hot 100	21
US Hot R&B/Hip-Hop Songs (Billboard)	10
US Rhythmic (Billboard)	9
US Rolling Stone Top 100	7

=== Year-end charts ===
Chart (2020)	Position
Australia (ARIA)	93
Canada (Canadian Hot 100)	65
Hungary (Stream Top 40)	61
Portugal (AFP)	54
US Billboard Hot 100	64
US Hot R&B/Hip-Hop Songs (Billboard)	32
US Rhythmic (Billboard)	41

== Certifications ==
Region	Certification	Certified units/sales
Australia (ARIA)	Platinum	70,000^{‡}
Belgium (BRMA)	Gold	20,000^{‡}
Canada (Music Canada)	2× Platinum	160,000^{‡}
Denmark (IFPI Danmark)	Platinum	90,000^{‡}
France (SNEP)	Gold	100,000^{‡}
Germany (BVMI)	Gold	200,000^{‡}
Italy (FIMI)	Gold	35,000^{‡}
Mexico (AMPROFON)	Gold	30,000^{‡}
New Zealand (RMNZ)	2× Platinum	60,000^{‡}
Poland (ZPAV)	Gold	25,000^{‡}
Portugal (AFP)	Platinum	10,000^{‡}
Switzerland (IFPI Switzerland)	Gold	10,000^{‡}
United Kingdom (BPI)	Platinum	600,000^{‡}
United States (RIAA)	4× Platinum	4,000,000^{‡}
^{‡} Sales+streaming figures based on certification alone.

== Lil Uzi Vert remix ==
"Party Girl (Remix)"

Single by StaySolidRocky and Lil Uzi Vert
- Released: July 10, 2020
- Recorded: 2020
- Genre: Emo rap
- Length: 2:33
- Label: Columbia
- Songwriters: Darak Figeroua; Symere Woods; Edgar Bustios
- Producer: Nashi

StaySolidRocky singles chronology
"Vacant Heart" (2020)	"Party Girl (Remix)" (2020)	"Party" (2020)

Lil Uzi Vert singles chronology
"Flood My Wrist" (2020)	"Party Girl (Remix)" (2020)	"Over Your Head" / "Patek" (2020)

Music video
- "Party Girl (Remix)" on YouTube

The song's official remix, with Lil Uzi Vert, was released on July 10, 2020.

=== Composition ===
Billboard's Carl Lamarre opined that on the remix, the rappers "overlook their girls' sexual conquests and combustible affairs to secure long-lasting relationships". Jordan Rose of Complex noted the rappers' melodic sound and how StaySolidRocky wears his heart on his sleeve, while giving "teenage angst a loftier sound, as he and Uzi bounce off each other seamlessly".

=== Critical reception ===
Carl Lamarre of Billboard found that the two work well together, writing: "Even if their admirable pursuits prove futile, you have to admire their chemistry on this retouched heater". Complex's Jordan Rose said "Uzi brought [their] talents", which he felt "is sure to only make the remix to 'Party Girl' balloon to the same heights as its original".
