= We Paid =

2020 song by Lil Baby and 42 Dugg

Song by Lil Baby and 42 Dugg

from the album My Turn (Deluxe)
- Released: May 1, 2020
- Genre: Trap
- Length: 3:01
- Label: Quality Control; Universal
- Songwriters: Dominique Jones; Dion Hayes; Rai'Shaun Williams
- Producer: Section 8

Music video
- "We Paid" on YouTube

"We Paid" is a song by American rappers Lil Baby and 42 Dugg. It was released as part of the deluxe edition of Lil Baby's second studio album My Turn, on May 1, 2020. A video was released a week later, on May 6. "We Paid" is a braggadocious song about the rappers' wealth and come-ups. Regarded as a standout cut from My Turn, the song received rave reviews from critics, with particular praise for 42 Dugg. On the chart dated July 11, 2020, the song became 42 Dugg's first top 10 entry on the Billboard Hot 100, peaking at number 10.

== Background ==
According to 42 Dugg, the song came about after connecting with Lil Baby during the 2020 Super Bowl in Miami Gardens. On April 9, 2020, he uploaded a clip on Instagram previewing the song's music video. It was released on May 1, 2020, as part of the deluxe version of My Turn, included as the final track on the album. Lil Baby's line, "runnin' 'round in these streets, it was me and Marquise", refers to Dugg's middle name.

== Composition and lyrics ==
The song opens with 42 Dugg's signature whistle. The track consists of a "lowkey" trap beat and kick drums, and sees Lil Baby and 42 Dugg blend their rap styles, with 42 Dugg employing slurred auto-tuned bars. Dugg raps the first verse, and, as noted by Complex's Jessica McKinney, utilises a rhythmic flow, while Lil Baby "speeds things up a bit with a dizzying delivery". 42 Dugg's opening line includes the lyrics "'Fore I go broke like Joc", a reference to rapper Yung Joc, which HotNewHipHop's Alex Zidel attributed to Yung Joc seen driving an Uber at the beginning of the year. Joc responded, saying he actually likes the song and is "far from" broke. Uproxx's Derrick Rossignol pointed out, "as the title suggests, the song is about the rappers having wealth, as they rap about things like cars and jewelry while honoring their upbringings, as the chorus – which they rap together – goes, 'Young turnt nigga from the D to the A / I'm rockin' with the Lions, yeah, I'm rocking with the Braves / Yeah, yeah, yeah, yeah, yeah, we paid'".

== Critical reception ==
Alphonse Pierre of Pitchfork called it "one of the best rap songs of the year". ABC News Radio called the song a "banger". Alexander Cole of HotNewHipHop also called it a banger and said the track "is yet another gold star on 42 Dugg's ever-growing resume". In review of My Turn's deluxe edition, Josh Svetz of HipHopDX praised 42 Dugg's appearance as "dynamic", while further complimenting Baby and Dugg's "superb chemistry", as they take "turns dunking on their opps like [Michael] Jordan and [Scottie] Pippen. Hypebeast's Patrick Johnson also applauded their chemistry for being on "top form", labeling the track a "standout" on My Turn, and stated: "The true standout here is Dugg's slurred auto-tuned bars". Complex's Jessica McKinney included it in their weekly round-up of Best New Music, also calling the track a standout on the album and said the duo make great teammates as they "take turns laying down sharp bars about their come-ups", with Lil Baby's delivery that "will leave listeners in awe". XXL also listed it among the best new songs of the week. Andrew Unterberger of Billboard named the song a contender for Song of the Summer, writing: "'We Paid' is a short, infectious banger motored by the pair's irrepressible lockstep energy and one of the year's most undeniable chorus hooks".

== Commercial performance ==
The song peaked at number 1 on US Apple Music across all genres, dethroning Lil Baby's own "The Bigger Picture". It reached number ten on the Billboard Hot 100 and number 8 on the Rolling Stone Top 100. The video has also garnered over 180 million views as of November 20, 2020.

== Music video ==
The song's official video, directed by KeeMotion, was released on May 6, 2020.

Set in Atlanta, the video stays relevant to its title, finding the rappers flaunting their riches and merging Atlanta and Detroit's (the rappers' respective hometowns) car culture. They are seen driving in their own black Hellcats, performing various manoeuvres, including donuts and burning out, while a grey Corvette that moves through the Hellcats makes an appearance. The video also documents a minor crash.

== Awards and nominations ==
Year	Organization	Award	Result	Ref.
2020	MTV Video Music Awards	Song of Summer	Nominated	

== Charts ==
=== Weekly charts ===
Weekly chart performance for "We Paid"
Chart (2020)	Peak position
Canada (Canadian Hot 100)	42
Ireland (IRMA)	80
New Zealand Hot Singles (RMNZ)	31
UK Singles (Official Charts)	89
US Billboard Hot 100	10
US Hot R&B/Hip-Hop Songs (Billboard)	8
US Rolling Stone Top 100	3

=== Year-end charts ===
2020 year-end chart performance for "We Paid"
Chart (2020)	Position
US Billboard Hot 100	57
US Hot R&B/Hip-Hop Songs (Billboard)	27

2021 year-end chart performance for "We Paid"
Chart (2021)	Position
US R&B/Hip-Hop Airplay Songs (Billboard)	47

== Certifications ==
Sales and certifications for "We Paid"
Region	Certification	Certified units/sales
Brazil (Pro-Música Brasil)	Gold	20,000^{‡}
United Kingdom (BPI)	Silver	200,000^{‡}
United States (RIAA)	5× Platinum	5,000,000^{‡}
^{‡} Sales+streaming figures based on certification alone.
