= Arizona Zervas =

American rapper (born 1995)

- Born: Arizona S. Zervas; April 19, 1995 (age 31); Providence, Rhode Island, U.S.
- Origin: Hagerstown, Maryland, U.S.
- Genres: Emo rap; pop rap; R&B
- Occupations: Rapper; singer; songwriter
- Years active: 2016–present
- Label: Columbia
- Website: arizonazervas.com

Arizona S. Zervas (born April 19, 1995) is an American rapper, singer, and songwriter. He is best known for his 2019 single "Roxanne", which peaked at number four on the Billboard Hot 100 after being featured in Spotify playlists. The success of the song led him to tour nationwide after its release, and in November of that year, he signed with Columbia Records. "Roxanne" also topped the charts in New Zealand, and reached the top ten in the UK, Australia, and several other countries. His debut studio album, Wild West (2023), was released independently and entered US Apple Music charts.

== Career ==
Zervas released his first song in the eleventh grade. His debut single "Don't Hit My Line" was released in 2016. This was followed up by the release of more than 30 songs - with nearly every song totaling 1 million streams on Spotify. A debut three-song EP Living Facts was released in 2018.

Zervas released his first charting song "Roxanne" on October 10, 2019. It quickly became a viral hit. The song reached number 1 on Spotify's United States Top 50 chart on November 8, becoming the first track by an unsigned, fully independent artist to top the chart. The song subsequently debuted at number 34 on the US Billboard Hot 100, as well as debuting at number 24 on the UK Singles Chart and reached number 1 in New Zealand, becoming his first number one on any national chart. The song sparked a bidding war among labels, and on November 15, 2019, it was reported that Zervas had signed with Columbia Records. This marks Columbia's second major signing of a viral star in 2019 following the label's deal with Lil Nas X, thanks to his breakout hit "Old Town Road".

According to Billboard magazine, Zervas has performed more than 50 shows across the United States, including at New York's Webster Hall.

On May 8, 2020, Zervas released his single "24". It is the follow-up to his hit single "Roxanne". He then released his single "RIP" on September 25, 2020.

== Discography ==
=== Studio albums ===
- Wild West (2023)
- Fast Dreams (2026)

=== Extended plays ===
| Title | Details |
|---|---|
| Living Facts | Released: June 3, 2018; Label: Self-released; Format: Digital download, streaming |

=== Singles ===
==== As lead artist ====
| Title | Year | Peak chart positions | | | | | | | | | Certifications | Album |
| Title | Year | US | AUS | CAN | GER | IRE | NOR | NZ | SWE | UK | Certifications | Album |
|---|---|---|---|---|---|---|---|---|---|---|---|---|
| "Roxanne" (solo or remix featuring Swae Lee) | 2019 | 4 | 2 | 3 | 27 | 4 | 3 | 1 | 9 | 4 | RIAA: 6× Platinum; ARIA: 4× Platinum; BPI: 2× Platinum; BVMI: Gold; MC: 6× Platinum; RMNZ: 4× Platinum | Non-album single |

==== As featured artist ====
| Title | Year | Peak chart positions | | Album |
| Title | Year | US Alt. | US Rock | Album |
|---|---|---|---|---|
| "Sober/Hungover" (Sueco featuring Arizona Zervas) | 2021 | 21 | 27 | It Was Fun While It Lasted |

=== Other charted songs ===
| Title | Year | Peak chart positions | | | | Certifications | Album |
| Title | Year | US Bub. | CAN | IRE | NZ Hot | Certifications | Album |
|---|---|---|---|---|---|---|---|
| "FML" | 2018 | 21 | 57 | 99 | 15 | RIAA: Platinum; MC: Gold; RMNZ: Gold | Living Facts |
