= Sum 2 Prove =

2020 single by Lil Baby

Single by Lil Baby

from the album My Turn
- Released: January 9, 2020
- Genre: Trap
- Length: 3:25
- Label: Quality Control; Universal
- Songwriters: Dominique Jones; Deundraeus Portis
- Producer: Twysted Genius

Lil Baby singles chronology
"U Played" (2020)	"Sum 2 Prove" (2020)	"1st N 3rd" (2020)

Music video
- "Sum 2 Prove" on YouTube

"Sum 2 Prove" is a song by American rapper Lil Baby, released on January 9, 2020 as the second single for his second studio album My Turn (2020). A music video was released on February 18, 2020, ten days before the album’s release.

== Composition ==
The song is backed by "retro" synths and soulful piano chords, with Lil Baby rapping "as if he's still got a chip on his shoulder".

== In popular culture ==
"Sum 2 Prove" appears on the NBA 2K21 video game soundtrack.

== Charts ==
=== Weekly charts ===
Chart (2020)	Peak position
Canada Hot 100 (Billboard)	43
UK Singles (Official Charts)	94
US Billboard Hot 100	16
US Hot R&B/Hip-Hop Songs (Billboard)	9
US Rolling Stone Top 100	3

=== Year-end charts ===
Chart (2020)	Position
US Billboard Hot 100	79
US Hot R&B/Hip-Hop Songs (Billboard)	25

== Certifications ==
Region	Certification	Certified units/sales
Brazil (Pro-Música Brasil)	Gold	20,000^{‡}
Canada (Music Canada)	Platinum	80,000^{‡}
United Kingdom (BPI)	Silver	200,000^{‡}
United States (RIAA)	7× Platinum	7,000,000^{‡}
^{‡} Sales+streaming figures based on certification alone.
