= Roxanne (Arizona Zervas song) =

2019 single by Arizona Zervas

Single by Arizona Zervas
- Released: October 10, 2019
- Genre: Pop rap; trap
- Length: 2:43
- Label: Columbia
- Songwriters: Arizona Zervas; Lauren Larue; Jace Jennings; Jacob Greenspan
- Producers: 94Skrt; Jae Green

Arizona Zervas singles chronology
"Fast" (2019)	"Roxanne" (2019)	"24" (2020)

Music video
- "Roxanne" on YouTube

"Roxanne" (stylized in all uppercase) is a song by the American rapper and singer Arizona Zervas. It was released on October 10, 2019. The song was written by the artist himself with Lauren Larue, and produced by 94Skrt and Jae Green.

"Roxanne" reached number one in New Zealand and peaked within the top ten in Australia, Norway, the UK, and the US. It reached the Top 40 in many other European and North American markets, including number four on the Billboard Hot 100. The success of the song sparked a bidding war among labels, and on November 15, 2019, it was reported that Zervas had signed with Columbia Records. A remix with the American rapper and singer Swae Lee was released on February 21, 2020. The song depicts a wealthy Californian woman from Malibu.

== Background and release ==
Zervas teased the release of the song by posting a clip of him dancing to the song on his Instagram a day prior to the release. The song was released on October 10, 2019. The track quickly became a viral hit on the app TikTok. Within the first three weeks, the song reached the Top 50 of the US Spotify and several iTunes charts.

== Chart performance ==
"Roxanne" became the first track by an unsigned, fully independent artist to top the Spotify chart since the beginning of 2017. The song subsequently debuted at number 34 on the US Billboard Hot 100, as well as debuting at number 24 on the UK Singles Chart and reaching number 1 in New Zealand, becoming his first number one on any national chart. It has peaked at number four in the US, where it also topped the Billboard Streaming Songs chart for the week dated November 30, 2019, making Zervas just the fourth artist to top the chart with their first charting song. The song also reached number two on the Mainstream Top 40 chart for two weeks, behind Dua Lipa's "Don't Start Now".

== Critical reception ==
Billboard described the song as "an instantly memorable pop-rap concoction with an attention-grabbing intro, a sing-along chorus and about an album's worth of addicting mini-hooks." Chris Lambert of Forbes compared Zervas' "smooth, dreamy flow" on the song to the likes of Migos and Post Malone. Elias Leight at Rolling Stone noted that the singer "likes to syllables and add a light quaver to his vocals" and how the song "sounds like a Post Malone demo".

== Music video ==
An official music video, directed by Nicholas Jandora, was released on February 12, 2020. It references 90s films Groundhog Day, Pulp Fiction and Trainspotting, and early 2000s films Kill Bill and 50 First Dates.

=== Background and concept ===
The video finds Zervas stuck in an "infinite loop" where he dies every day, only to wake up again the next morning, while Roxanne channels Uma Thurman's Mia Wallace character from Pulp Fiction. Zervas came up with the video's concept, with Columbia Records vice president of video production Saul Levitz noting how Zervas was "very specific" of how the character of Roxanne needed to be portrayed: "a conceptual hook with her constantly being this source of bad luck and him being stuck in this perpetual ride with her". The video features "colorful fashion and antiquated housing" while capturing a "vintage California aesthetic". Considering the song's popularity on TikTok, Levitz said they wanted the video to engage the audience in a new way and with that, wanted to uncover some mystery about Zervas, noting how Zervas had no previous videos and "people didn't even have many still photos of him".

== Credits and personnel ==
Credits adapted from Tidal.

- Arizona Zervas – associated performer, composer, lyricist
- Lauren Larue – composer, lyricist
- 94Skrt – producer, recording engineer
- Jae Green – producer
- Manny Marroquin – mixing engineer
- Chris Gehringer – mastering engineer

== Charts ==
=== Weekly charts ===
Chart (2019–2020)	Peak position
Australia (ARIA)	2
Austria (Ö3 Austria Top 40)	18
Belgium (Ultratop 50 Flanders)	11
Belgium (Ultratop 50 Wallonia)	10
Brazil (Top 100 Brasil)	92
Canada Hot 100 (Billboard)	3
Colombia (National-Report)	69
Czech Republic Singles Digital (ČNS IFPI)	9
Denmark (Tracklisten)	10
Finland (Suomen virallinen lista)	6
France (SNEP)	16
Germany (GfK)	27
Global 200 (Billboard)	147
Hungary (Rádiós Top 40)	25
Hungary (Stream Top 40)	10
Ireland (IRMA)	4
Italy (FIMI)	24
Latvia (LAIPA)	4
Lithuania (AGATA)	6
Malaysia (RIM)	3
Netherlands (Dutch Top 40)	5
Netherlands (Single Top 100)	3
New Zealand (Recorded Music NZ)	1
Norway (VG-lista)	3
Portugal (AFP)	8
Romania (Airplay 100)	31
Scottish Singles Sales (Official Charts)	13
Singapore (RIAS)	2
Slovakia Airplay (ČNS IFPI)	57
Slovakia Singles Digital (ČNS IFPI)	18
South Korea (Gaon)	73
Spain (Promusicae)	36
Sweden (Sverigetopplistan)	9
Switzerland (Schweizer Hitparade)	14
UK Singles (Official Charts)	4
US Billboard Hot 100	4
US Adult Pop Airplay (Billboard)	25
US Dance Airplay (Billboard)	3
US Hot R&B/Hip-Hop Songs (Billboard)	1
US Pop Airplay (Billboard)	2
US Rhythmic Airplay (Billboard)	1
US Rolling Stone Top 100	2

=== Year-end charts ===
Chart (2019)	Position
Hungary (Stream Top 40)	71
Netherlands (Dutch Top 40)	93

Chart (2020)	Position
Australia (ARIA)	29
Belgium (Ultratop Flanders)	41
Belgium (Ultratop Wallonia)	23
Canada (Canadian Hot 100)	9
Denmark (Tracklisten)	67
France (SNEP)	61
Germany (Official German Charts)	89
Hungary (Stream Top 40)	34
Iceland (Tónlistinn)	87
Ireland (IRMA)	39
Netherlands (Single Top 100)	58
New Zealand (Recorded Music NZ)	23
Portugal (AFP)	19
Romania (Airplay 100)	54
South Korea (Gaon)	121
Switzerland (Schweizer Hitparade)	44
UK Singles (OCC)	31
US Billboard Hot 100	16
US Dance/Mix Show Airplay (Billboard)	24
US Hot R&B/Hip-Hop Songs (Billboard)	6
US Mainstream Top 40 (Billboard)	18
US Rhythmic (Billboard)	12

== Certifications ==
Region	Certification	Certified units/sales
Australia (ARIA)	4× Platinum	280,000^{‡}
Belgium (BRMA)	Platinum	40,000^{‡}
Canada (Music Canada)	6× Platinum	480,000^{‡}
France (SNEP)	Diamond	333,333^{‡}
Germany (BVMI)	Gold	200,000^{‡}
Italy (FIMI)	Platinum	70,000^{‡}
Mexico (AMPROFON)	2× Platinum	120,000^{‡}
New Zealand (RMNZ)	4× Platinum	120,000^{‡}
Poland (ZPAV)	Gold	25,000^{‡}
Portugal (AFP)	3× Platinum	30,000^{‡}
Spain (Promusicae)	Platinum	60,000^{‡}
Switzerland (IFPI Switzerland)	Platinum	20,000^{‡}
United Kingdom (BPI)	2× Platinum	1,200,000^{‡}
United States (RIAA)	6× Platinum	6,000,000^{‡}
^{‡} Sales+streaming figures based on certification alone.

== Release history ==
Region	Date	Format	Label	Ref.
Various	October 10, 2019	Digital download; streaming	Arizona Zervas; Columbia	
United Kingdom	November 22, 2019	Contemporary hit radio	Arizona Zervas; Columbia	
United States	November 26, 2019	Contemporary hit radio	Columbia	
Italy	December 6, 2019	Contemporary hit radio	Sony	
United States	January 14, 2020	Urban contemporary radio	Columbia	
