= 2020 in American music =

The following is a list of events and releases that happened in 2020 in music in the United States.

== Events ==
=== January ===
- 10 – Selena Gomez released her first studio album in nearly five years, Rare.
  - Echosmith released their first studio album in six years, Lonely Generation.
- 13 – Lauren Daigle performed the National Anthem at the 2020 College Football Playoff National Championship at the Mercedes-Benz Superdome in New Orleans.
- 26 – The 62nd Annual Grammy Awards, hosted by Alicia Keys, took place at the Staples Center in Los Angeles. Billie Eilish and her brother Finneas took home the most awards with five each. Eilish won all four General field awards, including Album of the Year with When We All Fall Asleep, Where Do We Go?, both Record of the Year and Song of the Year for "Bad Guy", and Best New Artist. She is the first artist to win every major award in the same year since Christopher Cross in 1981.
- 31 – Taylor Swift released Miss Americana, a Netflix documentary based on the singer's life and her recent stance on politics to critical acclaim. Along with the documentary, Swift released a song, "Only the Young" alongside the documentary.

=== February ===
- 2 – Demi Lovato performed the National Anthem, and Jennifer Lopez and Shakira performed the halftime show during Super Bowl LIV at Hard Rock Stadium in Miami.
- 3 – Green Day released their first studio album in nearly four years, Father of All Motherfuckers.
- 14 – Justin Bieber released his first album in nearly five years, Changes.
- 24 – Armor for Sleep announced a reunion for a 2020 summer tour which will celebrate the 15th anniversary of their 2005 album, What to Do When You Are Dead, but soon the tour was postponed to 2021 due to the COVID-19 pandemic.

=== March ===
- 2 – After 35 years with the group, Flavor Flav was fired from Public Enemy.
- 6 – Lauv released his full-length debut studio album How I'm Feeling.
  - Mandy Moore released her first studio album in eleven years, Silver Landings.
    - Lil Uzi Vert released their long-awaited studio album Eternal Atake
- 13 – Jay Electronica released his debut studio album and his first full project in thirteen years, A Written Testimony.
- 20 – Legendary country singer and actor Kenny Rogers died at the age of 81.
  - Conan Gray released his full-length debut studio album Kid Krow, becoming the biggest new artist debut of the year.
  - The Weeknd released his fourth studio album After Hours, the most-streamed R&B album of all time and one of his greatest and most conceptual projects so far. However, it garnered some controversy after The Weeknd boycotted the Grammy Awards for nominating him on the General Field categories, such as Album of the Year and Song of the Year.
- 22 – Childish Gambino, released his first studio album in four years, 3.15.20.
- 27 – Pearl Jam released their first studio album in seven years, Gigaton.
  - Jessi Alexander released her first album in six years, Decatur Country Red.

=== April ===
- 3 – Testament released their first studio album in four years, Titans of Creation.
  - Sam Hunt released his first studio album in six years, Southside.
- 10 – Sparta released their first studio album in fourteen years, Trust the River.
  - The Strokes released their first studio album in seven years, The New Abnormal.
  - Maddie & Tae released their first studio album in five years, The Way It Feels.
- 17 – Fiona Apple released her first studio album in eight years, Fetch the Bolt Cutters.
- 22 – X released their first studio album in 27 years, Alphabetland.

=== May ===
- 9 – Little Richard died at the age of 87 due to bone cancer.
- 17 – Just Sam won the eighteenth season of American Idol. Arthur Gunn was named runner-up.
- 19 – Todd Tilghman was named winner of the eighteenth season of The Voice. Toneisha Harris was named runner-up.
- 29 – Lady Gaga released her first studio album in nearly four years, Chromatica.

=== June ===
- 11 – Lady Antebellum changed their name to Lady A (a nickname fans have gave them since they first came out) in the wake of the George Floyd protests, to remove any associations the old name might have had with Civil War history, slavery and the Antebellum South.
- 19 – Lamb of God released their self-titled album, their first studio album of original material in five years.
  - Mushroomhead released their first studio album in six years, A Wonderful Life.
  - Phantom Planet released their first studio album in twelve years, Devastator.
- 23 – Hum released their first studio album in 22 years, Inlet.
- 26 – Kansas released their first studio album in four years, The Absence of Presence.

=== July ===
- 6 – Country music legend Charlie Daniels died at the age of 83.
- 10 – Rufus Wainwright released his first studio album in eight years, Unfollow The Rules.
  - Static-X released Project Regeneration Volume 1, their first studio album in 11 years; it features some of the final recordings of original frontman Wayne Static who died in November 2014.
  - The Rentals released their first studio album in six years Q36.
  - My Morning Jacket released their first studio album in five years, The Waterfall II.
- 17 – The Chicks, formerly known as the Dixie Chicks, released their first album in fourteen years, Gaslighter. It is also their first album under their new name. They had dropped "Dixie", which referenced the American Mason–Dixon line, separating the free and slave-owning southern states. The name change followed criticism that the word had connotations of American slavery.
- 24 – Neon Trees released their first studio album in six years, I Can Feel You Forgetting Me.
- 31 – Brandy released her first studio album in eight years, B7.

=== August ===
- 14 – Tanya Donelly released her first studio album in fourteen years, with the Parkington Sisters, Tanya Donelly and the Parkingtion Sisters.
- 21 – Bright Eyes released their first studio album in nine years, Down in the Weeds, Where the World Once Was.
  - Tim McGraw released his first solo studio album in five years, Here on Earth.
- 22 – Singer Alex Varkatzas left Atreyu after 22 years with the band.
- 28 – G.E. Smith released his first studio album in five years, Stony Hill.
- 30 – The MTV Video Music Awards took place. Lady Gaga took home the most awards with five including Artist of the Year.

=== September ===
- 16 – The 55th Academy of Country Music Awards took place at the MGM Grand Garden Arena in Las Vegas, Nevada. It was originally scheduled for April 5 but was postponed due to the COVID-19 pandemic.
- 18 – Alicia Keys released her first studio album in four years, Alicia.
- 25 – Sufjan Stevens released his first solo studio album in five years, The Ascension.
  - Deftones released their first studio album in four years, Ohms.

=== October ===
- 2 – Aloe Blacc released his first studio album in six years, All Love Everything.
  - Bon Jovi released their first studio album in four years, 2020.
  - Dolly Parton released her first Christmas album in 30 years, A Holly Dolly Christmas.
- 6 – Van Halen guitarist Eddie Van Halen died from throat cancer at the age of 65. The following month, the band officially announced their disbandment.
- 9 – DevilDriver released their first studio album of original material in four years, Dealing With Demons I. The first part of a double-album cycle, the second part was due to be released in 2021, but will arrive in 2023.
  - Blue Öyster Cult released their first studio album in nineteen years, The Symbol Remains.
- 14 – The Billboard Music Awards took place.
- 21 – The CMT Music Awards took place.
- 23 – Armored Saint released their first studio album in five years, Punching the Sky.
- 30 – Busta Rhymes released his first studio album in eight years, Extinction Level Event 2: The Wrath of God.
  - Mr. Bungle released their first studio album in 21 years, The Raging Wrath of the Easter Bunny Demo.
  - Puscifer released their first studio album in five years, Existential Reckoning.

=== November ===
- 6 – Fates Warning released their first studio album in four years, Long Day Good Night.
- 11 – The CMA Awards took place. Darius Rucker and Reba McEntire hosts.
- 12 – Billie Eilish released "Therefore I Am", the second single from her second studio album Happier Than Ever. The song made the fourth-biggest leap in Billboard Hot 100 history, vaulting from 94-2 on the chart.
- 22 – The American Music Awards took place.
- 27 – Hatebreed released their first studio album in four years, Weight of the False Self.

=== December ===
- 4 – Geographer released their first full-length studio album in five years, Down And Out In The Garden Of Earthly Delights.
- 7 – It was announced that Bob Dylan had sold all rights in his entire song catalog to Universal Music Publishing Group.
- 11 – M. Ward released his first studio album in four years, Think of Spring.
  - Less Than Jake released their first studio album in seven years, Silver Linings; it is also their first album without founding drummer Vinnie Fiorello, who left the band in 2018.
  - Kid Cudi released his first solo studio album in four years, Man on the Moon III: The Chosen.
- 12 – Charley Pride, the first Black superstar of country music died at age 86, due to complications of COVID-19.

== Bands formed ==
- Darko US
- Koyo
- L.S. Dunes
- The Violent

== Bands reformed ==
- Armor for Sleep
- Attack Attack!
- Destroy Rebuild Until God Shows
- Dream Street
- The Firm
- The Format
- Foxy Shazam
- Genesis
- I, the Breather
- Jazz Warriors
- JLS
- The Juliana Theory
- Living Things
- The Microphones
- Mott the Hoople
- Mr. Bungle
- Narcissus
- The Network
- The Original Rudeboys
- Rage Against the Machine
- The Receiving End of Sirens
- Secret Machines
- Son of Sam
- Tribe
- Thursday
- Toto
- The Union Underground

== Bands on hiatus ==
- Against Me!
- The Chainsmokers
- Grizzly Bear
- Imagine Dragons
- Night Riots
- Real Friends
- Simple Creatures
- Stone Sour

== Bands disbanded ==
- Babes In Toyland
- JJ Doom
- KMD
- Madvillain
- The Mowgli's
- Myka Relocate
- She Wants Revenge
- Van Halen

== Albums released in 2020 ==
=== January ===
Date	Album	Artist	Genre (s)
3	Dead and Gone (EP)	Stabbing Westward	Industrial metal; alternative metal; alternative rock
10	Re-Dunn	Ronnie Dunn	Country; country rock
10	Lonely Generation	Echosmith	Pop; Indie pop
10	Rare	Selena Gomez	Pop
10	I Disagree	Poppy	Pop-metal
17	20/20 Vision	Anti-Flag	Punk rock
17	How to Be Human	Chelsea Cutler	EDM
17	Music to Be Murdered By	Eminem	Hip hop; Horrorcore
17	The Juice	G. Love & Special Sauce	Alternative rock
17	Manic	Halsey	Indie pop; electropop; R&B
17	Nothing But Love	Jana Herzen	Folk; rock
17	Nightfall	Little Big Town	Country
17	Tullahoma	Dustin Lynch	Country
17	Masquerade	Mest	Pop punk
17	Circles	Mac Miller	Hip hop
17	UR FUN	of Montreal	Indie rock; indie pop
17	Calafrio	Stroke 9	Alternative rock
17	Born to Rule	Transviolet	Indie pop; alternative rock
24	Aurora	Breaking Benjamin	Acoustic; hard rock; post-grunge
24	Leave What's Lost Behind	Colony House	Indie rock
24	Good Good Man	Vance Gilbert	Folk
24	1000 Faces	Jason Ross	House; trance
31	The Best Ones of The Best Ones	Dashboard Confessional	Rock; pop
31	Ice Cream Hell	Tinsley Ellis	Blues; rock
31	High Road	Kesha	Pop; dance
31	Likewise	Frances Quinlan	Indie rock; indie pop
31	Treat Myself	Meghan Trainor	Pop; dance

=== February ===
Date	Album	Artist	Genre (s)
7	Country Fuzz	The Cadillac Three	Country
7	Almost Forever	Cheerleader	Indie pop; alternative rock
7	Wake Up	Fat Tony	Hip hop
7	Father of All Motherfuckers	Green Day	Alternative rock; rock
7	Limitless	Richard Marx	Rock; pop
7	Never Not Together	Nada Surf	Alternative rock
7	Perdida	Stone Temple Pilots	Acoustic; rock
7	Play That Rock N' Roll	The Supersuckers	Rock
14	Honeymoon	Beach Bunny	Indie pop; power pop
14	New Empire, Vol. 1	Hollywood Undead	Hard rock; rap rock; heavy metal
14	Weather	Huey Lewis and the News	Rock; pop
14	Carly Pearce	Carly Pearce	Country
14	And It's Still Alright	Nathaniel Rateliff	Folk; folk rock
14	Swimmer	Tennis	Indie pop; dream pop
14	Baby Gravy 2	Yung Gravy & bbno$	Hip hop
21	Always Tomorrow	Best Coast	Indie pop
21	Dreamland	COIN	Indie pop; pop rock
21	The Studio album Collection	Dio	Hard rock; heavy metal
21	Envy	Framing Hanley	Alternative rock
21	Surrender Your Poppy Field	Guided by Voices	Lo-fi; alternative rock
21	Wild Wild West	Sunny Jain	Jazz; world
21	From This Place	Pat Metheny	Jazz; world
28	F8	Five Finger Death Punch	Hard rock; heavy metal
28	Brain Pain	Four Year Strong	Pop punk; melodic hardcore
28	It's Easy To Feel Like A Nobody	Juiceboxxx	Hip hop
28	Saturn Return	The Secret Sisters	Folk; country
28	Color Theory	Soccer Mommy	Indie rock; pop rock

=== March ===
Date	Album	Artist	Genre (s)
6	Chilombo	Jhene' Aiko	Contemporary R&B
6	Kids Like Us	The Grahams	Rock; folk
6	You'll Be Fine	Hot Mulligan	Pop punk
6	How I'm Feeling	Lauv	Pop
6	Eternal Atake	Lil Uzi Vert	Hip hop; trap
6	Silver Landings	Mandy Moore	Pop
6	Ceremony	Phantogram	Electronic rock
6	Bone Structure	Ron Pope	Rock; pop
6	Superstar	Caroline Rose	Indie pop; indie rock; alternative rock
6	PLACEMENT	Watsky	Alternative hip hop
13	Darwin Deez 10 Yearz	Darwin Deez	Indie rock
13	You Know I'm Not Going Anywhere	The Districts	Indie rock; folk rock
13	Healer	Grouplove	Alternative rock; indie pop
13	A Written Testimony	Jay Electronica	Hip hop
13	Possession	Joywave	Indie rock; alternative rock
13	Supernova	Caitlyn Smith	Pop; country
13	Thrill Seeker (EP)	Sub Urban	Indie pop; alternative rock
13	Pink	Two Feet	Electronic rock
20	Kelsea	Kelsea Ballerini	Country pop
20	The Light	Delta Rae	Blues rock; folk rock
20	Kid Krow	Conan Gray	Dream pop; indie pop
20	Mabern Plays Mabern	Harold Mabern	Jazz; blues
20	Through a Dark Wood	Sea Wolf	Indie rock
22	3.15.20	Childish Gambino	Hip hop; PBR&B; psychedelic
26	Ghosts V: Together	Nine Inch Nails	Ambient; industrial rock
26	Ghosts VI: Locusts	Nine Inch Nails	Ambient; industrial rock
27	Decatur Country Red	Jessi Alexander	Country
27	Thirtes	Jill Andrews	Bluegrass; pop
27	Mother	In This Moment	Hard rock
27	Gigaton	Pearl Jam	Alternative rock; hard rock
27	Saint Cloud	Waxahatchee	Indie rock; indie folk

=== April ===
Date	Album	Artist	Genre (s)
1	Tafelmuzik Means More When You're Alone	The Dandy Warhols	
3	Wake Up, Sunshine	All Time Low	Pop punk; pop rock
3	Southside	Sam Hunt	Country pop
3	The Mike & Micky Show Live	The Monkees	Rock; pop
3	Titans of Creation	Testament	Thrash metal
3	Migration Stories	M. Ward	Indie folk; alternative rock
10	It's Spooky (30th Anniversary)	Jad Fair & Daniel Johnston	Indie rock; alternative rock
10	Tangerine (EP)	Hot Chelle Rae	Pop rock
10	The Loves of Your Life	Hamilton Leithauser	Indie rock
10	LIFERS	Local H	Alternative rock
10	The Way It Feels	Maddie & Tae	Country
10	Declaration	Red	Christian rock; rock
10	Trust the River	Sparta	Alternative rock; post-hardcore
10	The New Abnormal	The Strokes	Indie rock; garage rock; alternative rock
17	Fetch the Bolt Cutters	Fiona Apple	Art pop
17	Trust Fall (Side B) (EP)	Incubus	Alternative rock
17	Illusory	Jarboe	Art rock; blues
17	Harmonic Disruptor	Julien-K	Electronic rock; industrial rock
17	Shelby Lynne	Shelby Lynne	Pop; country; country pop
17	Hurry Up and Wait	Soul Asylum	Rock
22	Alphabetland	X	Punk rock
23	Flowers on the Weekend	Asher Roth	Hip hop
24	Shortly After Take Off	BC Camplight	Indie rock
24	Afterburner	Dance Gavin Dance	Post-hardcore; progressive rock
24	For Their Love	Other Lives	Indie rock
24	Heartwork	The Used	Alternative rock; hard rock
24	Good Souls Better Angels	Lucinda Williams	Country

=== May ===
Date	Album	Artist	Genre (s)
1	Making a Door Less Open	Car Seat Headrest	Indie rock; pop rock
1	Invasion of the B-Girls	Josie Cotton	Pop rock; new wave
1	Color TV	Dramarama	Alternative rock; rock
1	Flowers For You	Sawyer Fredericks	Blues; folk
1	Good to Know	JoJo	Pop
1	Dream Hunting in the Valley of the In-Between	Man Man	Indie rock
8	It Was Good Until It Wasn't	Kehlani	R&B
8	Straight Songs of Sorrow	Mark Lanegan	Rock
8	That's How Rumors Get Started	Margo Price	Country; pop
8	Half Written Story	Hailee Steinfeld	Pop; dance
8	Petals for Armor	Hayley Williams	Rock; pop
15	All Visible Objects	Moby	Pop; dance
15	Set My Heart on Fire Immediately	Perfume Genius	Indie pop; chamber pop
15	The Album Part II	Chase Rice	Country; pop
15	Temple	Thao & the Get Down Stay Down	Indie rock; experimental rock
15	In The Dark Moving	Emily Wells	Alternative; classical
22	Hollywood Park	The Airborne Toxic Event	Indie rock; alternative rock
22	Ghosts of West Virginia	Steve Earle	Country; heartland rock
22	I Don't Have To Be Good	Emily Keener	Pop; folk
22	Colour Vision	MAX	Pop; dance
29	These Two Windows	Alec Benjamin	Pop
29	Life on the Flip Side	Jimmy Buffett	Americana
29	Diplo Presents Thomas Wesley, Chapter 1: Snake Oil	Diplo	Country pop; trap; EDM
29	Giovannie and the Hired Guns	Giovannie and the Hired Guns	Country rock; rock
29	Chromatica	Lady Gaga	Pop; dance
29	The Bastards	Palaye Royale	Art rock; alternative rock

=== June ===
Date	Album	Artist	Genre (s)
5	Message to the World	Ballyhoo!	Punk rock; alternative rock
5	Blues With Friends	Dion	Pop; blues
5	Everything's Strange Here	G-Eazy	Rap; alternative hip hop
5	What In The World	Michael McDermott	Americana
5	Rearrange Us	Mt. Joy	Indie rock
5	Muzz	Muzz	Art rock; indie rock; post-rock
5	RTJ4	Run the Jewels	Hip hop
12	Ungodly Hour	Chloe x Halle	R&B
12	Canyons	Gone West	Country
12	Chosen Family Tree	Kree Harrison	Country; pop
12	Class of 98	Eric Hutchinson	Rock; pop
12	Pick Me Up off The Floor	Norah Jones	Pop; jazz
12	Self Made Man	Larkin Poe	Roots rock; folk rock
18	Punisher	Phoebe Bridgers	Indie rock; indie pop
19	You Make Me Feel	Don Bryant	R&B; soul
19	South Front Street Retrosepctive 1997-2019	Grayson Capps	Americana; blues rock
19	Rough and Rowdy Ways	Bob Dylan	Folk; folk rock
19	Lamb of God	Lamb of God	Groove metal; metalcore; thrash metal
19	A Wonderful Life	Mushroomhead	Alternative metal; nu metal; industrial metal
19	Forever + Ever x Infinity	New Found Glory	Pop punk
19	Devastator	Phantom Planet	Alternative rock; garage rock
23	Inlet	Hum	Post-hardcore; alternative metal; shoegazing
26	Speak of the Devil	Mickey Avalon	Hip hop
26	Women in Music Pt. III	Haim	Pop rock; soft rock; indie rock
26	The Absence of Presence	Kansas	Rock; pop
26	I Can Feel You Forgetting Me	Neon Trees	Pop rock; alternative rock
26	Soul Food Cooking with Maceo	Maceo Parker	R&B; soul; jazz
26	A Portrait of an Ugly Man	Remo Drive	Indie rock; power pop; pop punk
26	Keepin' It Real	Bobby Watson	Jazz; R&B

=== July ===
Date	Album	Artist	Genre (s)
3	The Black Hole Understands	Cloud Nothings	Indie rock
3	So Icy Summer	Gucci Mane	Hip hop
3	First Rose of Spring	Willie Nelson	Country
3	The Things That Got Us Here	Sidewalk Prophets	Christian; pop
3	A Steady Drip, Drip, Drip	Sparks	Rock; pop; new wave
3	Shadow Work	Trapt	Nu metal; hard rock
10	1000 Gecs and the Tree of Clues	100 gecs	Electronic; experimental; avant-pop
10	Sunday Drive	Brett Eldredge	Country pop
10	Brainwashed Generation	Enuff Z'Nuff	Hard rock; heavy metal
10	Legends Never Die	Juice Wrld	Hip hop; trap; emo rap
10	The Waterfall II	My Morning Jacket	Indie rock
10	RoundAgain	Joshua Redman	Jazz
10	Q36	The Rentals	New Wave; alternative rock
10	Project Regeneration Vol. 1	Static-X	Industrial metal
10	Unfollow the Rules	Rufus Wainwright	Indie pop; rock
17	Species	Bing & Ruth	Alternative rock; indie rock
17	Gaslighter	The Chicks	Country
17	A Small Death	Samantha Crain	Folk
17	Rosewood	Mike Dillon	Rock; pop
17	Ugly Is Beautiful	Oliver Tree	Alternative rock
17	My Love Is A Hurricane	David Ramirez	Americana
24	Into the Raging Sea	Broadside	Pop punk; alternative rock
24	Let There Be Nothing	Judicator	Power metal; heavy metal
24	Bad Vacation	Liza Anne	Rock; alternative rock
24	Superbloom	MisterWives	Indie pop; pop rock
24	Look for the Good	Jason Mraz	Rock; pop
24	The Balladeer	Lori McKenna	Country; folk
24	Folklore	Taylor Swift	Indie folk; alternative rock; folktronica; chamber pop
24	Endless Space (Between You And I)	Winter	Doom metal; death metal
29	Supraliminal	Tommy Walter	Instrumental rock
31	Born Innocent	Alcatrazz	Hard rock; heavy metal
31	B7	Brandy	R&B
31	What Could Possibly Go Wrong	Dominic Fike	Alternative hip hop; pop rock
31	Alphaville	Imperial Triumphant	Black metal; death metal
31	Sucker's Lunch	Madeline Kenney	Indie rock
31	Once In A Lifetime	Mac McAnally	Country

=== August ===
Date	Album	Artist	Genre (s)
7	Anywhere Else But Here (EP)	American Hi-Fi	Rock
7	Just Coolin	Art Blakey	Jazz
7	Born Here Live Here Die Here	Luke Bryan	Country pop
7	Mukiltearth	The Fall of Troy	Mathcore; post-hardcore
7	Jumpin In The Night (Reissue)	Flamin' Groovies	Garage rock; rock
7	Eight Gates	Jason Molina	Indie rock; alternative rock
7	Purple Noon	Washed Out	Chillwave; indie pop
14	5 Hot August Nights	Neil Diamond	Rock; pop
14	Tanya Donelly & The Parkington Sisters	Tanya Donelly	Alternative rock; indie rock
14	If It Wasn't For You	Caylee Hammack	Country; pop
14	Gift Of Sacrifice	King Buzzo	Grunge; punk rock; alternative metal
14	Matt Rollings Mosaic	Matt Rollings	Country; pop
21	Beneath the Black Palms	Blaqk Audio	Synth-pop; dark wave
21	Down in the Weeds, Where the World Once Was	Bright Eyes	Indie rock
21	Sugaregg	Bully	Indie rock; punk rock
21	New Age Norms 2	Cold War Kids	Indie rock; alternative rock
21	In Sickness & In Flames	The Front Bottoms	Indie rock; folk punk
21	Mirrored Aztec	Guided By Voices	Indie rock
21	The Beautiful Madness	Jerry Joseph	Rock; pop; country
21	Imploding the Mirage	The Killers	Alternative rock; pop rock
21	Songs For The General Public	The Lemon Twigs	Rock; pop
21	En Español	The Mavericks	Tejano; country
21	Here on Earth	Tim McGraw	Country
21	The Land That Time Forgot	Chuck Prophet	Rock; country rock
28	Sunset Suburbia	Diesel	Hip hop
28	The Second Album	The Empty Hearts	Garage rock; rock and roll
28	B4 The Storm	Internet Money	Hip hop
28	Blackbirds	Bettye LaVette	Blues; R&B; soul
28	Conversations with Myself About You	lovelytheband	Alternative rock; indie pop
28	The Barfly Sessions	Heidi Newfield	Country; pop
28	The Room	Ricky Reed	Hip hop; pop
28	Smile	Katy Perry	Pop; dance
28	Stony Hill	G.E. Smith	Rock; pop rock

=== September ===
Date	Album	Artist	Genre (s)
4	Detroit 2	Big Sean	Hip hop
4	Gold Record	Bill Callahan	Alternative country; lo-fi
4	Levels	Fame on Fire	Hard rock; rap rock
4	When I Wait For You	Dirk Powell	Folk; country
4	Sun Racket	Throwing Muses	Alternative rock
4	AngelHead Hipster Songs of T Rex	Various Artists	Rock; pop
11	Aftermath	Elizabeth Cook	Country; pop
11	Yellow Coat	Matt Costa	Indie rock; folk rock
11	American Head	The Flaming Lips	Indie rock; post-punk; alternative rock
11	The Essential Gary Lucas	Gary Lucas	Rock; pop; blues
14	For Farewell of Nostalgia	Vision Eternel	Ambient rock
18	Host	Cults	Indie pop; indie rock
18	Find the Sun	Deradoorian	Art pop; indie pop; indie rock
18	Alicia	Alicia Keys	R&B; soul; Orchestral pop
18	No Good Left to Give	Movements	Emo; post-hardcore
18	Trouble And Strife	Joan Osborne	Rock; folk; pop
18	Paint Your Emotion	The Ries Brothers	Rock; pop
18	The Speed of Now Part 1	Keith Urban	Country; R&B; pop
18	Two to One	James Williamson	Hard rock; punk rock
18	Nite Creatures	Joe Wong	pop; rock
22	Shore	Fleet Foxes	Indie folk
25	Holy Smokes Future Jokes	Blitzen Trapper	Alternative country; indie folk
25	Generations	Will Butler	Indie rock
25	Gangsta's Paradise (25th Anniversary)	Coolio	Hip-hop; rap
25	Ohms	Deftones	Alternative metal
25	Building	Shannon LaBrie	Pop; Americana
25	Tickets to My Downfall	Machine Gun Kelly	Pop punk; pop rock
25	Queen of the Night	Anya Marina	Indie rock; indie pop
25	Blue Hearts	Bob Mould	Punk rock; alternative rock
25	Chip Chrome & The Mono-Tones	The Neighbourhood	Alternative rock; indie rock
25	The Ascension	Sufjan Stevens	Indie folk; indie rock
25	Free Love	Sylvan Esso	Electropop; indie pop
25	My Gift	Carrie Underwood	Christmas; country

=== October ===
Date	Album	Artist	Genre (s)
2	Gold	The Bangles	Rock; pop; new wave
2	All Love Everything	Aloe Blacc	R&B; funk; soul
2	Bon Jovi: 2020	Bon Jovi	Rock; pop rock
2	A Holly Dolly Christmas	Dolly Parton	Christmas; country
2	Gasanova	Yung Gravy	Hip hop
9	Wild, Free	Acceptance	Alternative rock
9	The Symbol Remains	Blue Öyster Cult	Hard rock; heavy metal
9	Dealing With Demons Part I	DevilDriver	Hard rock; heavy metal
9	As Long as You Are	Future Islands	Indie rock
9	Sliver Ladders	Mary Lattimore	Electronic; dance
9	Edge of the World	Youngblood Hawke	Indie rock; indie pop
16	Serpentine Prison	Matt Berninger	Rock; alternative rock
16	Impossible Weight	Deep Sea Diver	Indie rock
16	ANDRO	Tommy Lee	Hard rock; rock
16	Private Lives	Low Cut Connie	Rock; pop
16	Closer To Mars	Mario	R&B
16	night, love you.	Nightly	Pop rock; indie pop
16	Wildflowers & All The Rest	Tom Petty	Rock; pop
16	Arm In Arm	Steep Canyon Rangers	Bluegrass
23	Punching the Sky	Armored Saint	Heavy metal
23	This Is What I Live For	Blue October	Alternative rock; rock
23	Volume 2	The Bouncing Souls	Punk rock
23	Pixel Bath	Jean Dawson	Alternative hip hop; experimental pop; indie rock
23	Razzmatazz	I Dont Know How but They Found Me	Indie pop; alternative rock
23	Modern Yesterdays	Kaki King	Experimental rock; indie rock
23	Can You Feel the Sun	Missio	Indie rock; pop rock
23	Getting Into Knives	The Mountain Goats	Indie rock
23	Forgotten Days	Pallbearer	Hard rock; heavy metal; doom metal
23	Living on Mercy	Dan Penn	Country; rock; pop
23	Blood & Stone	Sevendust	Alternative metal; rock
23	Love Is the King	Jeff Tweedy	Indie rock
23	My Echo	Laura Veirs	Folk; chamber folk
30	The Day Before Halloween	Atmosphere	Hip hop
30	The Human Condition	Black Stone Cherry	Heavy metal; hard rock
30	Extinction Level Event 2: The Wrath of God	Busta Rhymes	Hip hop; rap
30	The Otherside	Cam	Country
30	Live at the Fillmore (vinyl)	Dredg	Art rock; rock; alternative rock
30	Earth to Dora	Eels	Indie rock
30	It's Christmas All Over	Goo Goo Dolls	Christmas; rock
30	Positions	Ariana Grande	Pop; R&B
30	A Tori Kelly Christmas	Tori Kelly	Christmas; pop
30	The Raging Wrath of the Easter Bunny Demo	Mr. Bungle	Thrash metal
30	All Rise	Gregory Porter	R&B; soul
30	Existential Reckoning	Puscifer	Alternative rock; post-industrial

=== November ===
Date	Album	Artist	Genre (s)
3	Oh That Monster	Thelonious Monster	Punk rock; alternative rock
6	A View From The Inside	Reb Beach	Hard rock; heavy metal
6	The Glitz The Glamour	Perry Farrell	Alternative rock; rock
6	Long Day Good Night	Fates Warning	Hard rock; heavy metal
6	American Dream	Larry Keel	Country; bluegrass
6	Get Closer	Linda Ronstadt	Rock; pop
13
13	Weekend in London	George Benson	R&B; jazz; soul
13	Renegades	L.A. Guns	Hard rock; heavy metal
13	From Exile (Vinyl Reissue)	The Menzingers	Punk rock; indie rock
13	Staunch Honey	David Nance	Alternative rock; rock
13	Starting Over	Chris Stapleton	Country
20	Hey World	Lee Brice	Country; pop
20	Wreckless Abandon	Mike Campbell	Rock; pop
20	A Decade of Destruction Vol 2	Five Finger Death Punch	Hard rock; heavy metal
20	Harmony	Josh Groban	Easy listening; pop rock; soft rock
20	20	Matchbox Twenty	Alternative rock; pop rock
27	Plastic Hearts	Miley Cyrus	Pop; dance
27	Weight of the False Self	Hatebreed	Metalcore; hardcore punk
27	Black Coffee (Vinyl Reissue)	Peggy Lee	Jazz; pop
27	Grandpa Metal	Brian Posehn	Hard rock; heavy metal
27	For Such A Time As This	Eric Reed	Jazz; pop; R&B; soul
27	Cyr	The Smashing Pumpkins	Alternative rock

=== December ===
Date	Album	Artist	Genre (s)
4	Hyperspace (Deluxe Edition)	Beck	Alternative rock
4	Life Is Only One Event	Cloud Nothings	Indie rock
4	Southern Symphony	Russell Dickerson	Country; pop
4	Down and Out in the Garden of Earthly Delights	Geographer	Dream pop; electronic rock
4	Never Look Back	Goldfinger	Ska punk; punk rock
4	The End	Three 6 Mafia	Hip hop; rap
4	Sabbath Sessions Vol. 1	Craig Wedren	Indie rock; alternative rock
11	George Coleman Quintet in Baltimore	George Coleman	Jazz; post-bop; R&B
11	In the Darkest of Nights, Let the Birds Sing	Foster the People	Indie rock; Psychedelic pop
11	Burn	Foxy Shazam	Glam rock; pop rock; experimental rock
11	Man on the Moon III: The Chosen	Kid Cudi	Hip hop
11	Silver Linings	Less Than Jake	Pop punk; punk rock; ska punk
11	I Can See Your House From Here (Vinyl Reissue)	Pat Metheny	Jazz; jazz fusion
11	Alter Egos	Ingrid Michaelson	Indie pop; indie folk
11	Evermore	Taylor Swift	Alternative rock; chamber rock; folk-pop; indie folk
11	Think of Spring	M. Ward	Alternative country; indie rock
18	The New OK	Drive-By Truckers	Southern rock
18	As Daylight Dies (Vinyl Reissue)	Killswitch Engage	Hard rock; heavy metal
18	Swimming In Circles	Mac Miller	Hip hop
18	Influence	Shane Ochsner	Hard rock; rock
18	Operation: Wake Up	Mike Posner	Hip hop
18	Notes From The Archive	Maggie Rogers	Pop; art pop
25	Space Camp	Audio Karate	Alternative rock; indie rock
25	Buzz (Reissue)	Autograph	Hard rock; heavy metal
25	Piano Solos	Dustin O'Halloran	Classical; pop
25	Whole Lotta Red	Playboi Carti	Hip hop
25	Headstrong Greatest Hits	Trapt	Alternative rock; hard rock

== Top songs on record ==
=== Billboard Hot 100 No. 1 Songs ===
- "All I Want for Christmas Is You" – Mariah Carey (2 weeks in 2019, 2 weeks in 2020)
- "Blinding Lights" – The Weeknd (4 weeks)
- "Cardigan" – Taylor Swift (1 week)
- "Circles" – Post Malone (2 weeks in 2019, 1 week in 2020)
- "Dynamite" – BTS (3 weeks)
- "Franchise" – Travis Scott feat. Young Thug and M.I.A. (1 week)
- "Life Goes On" – BTS (1 week)
- "Mood" – 24kGoldn feat. Iann Dior (6 weeks)
- "Positions" – Ariana Grande (1 week)
- "Rain on Me" – Lady Gaga and Ariana Grande (1 week)
- "Rockstar" – DaBaby feat. Roddy Ricch (7 weeks)
- "Savage" – Megan Thee Stallion feat. Beyoncé (1 week)
- "Savage Love (Laxed – Siren Beat)" – Jawsh 685, Jason Derulo and BTS (1 week)
- "Say So" – Doja Cat feat. Nicki Minaj (1 week)
- "Stuck with U" – Ariana Grande and Justin Bieber (1 week)
- "The Box" – Roddy Ricch (11 weeks)
- "The Scotts" – The Scotts, Travis Scott and Kid Cudi (1 week)
- "Toosie Slide" – Drake (1 week)
- "Trollz" – 6ix9ine and Nicki Minaj (1 week)
- "WAP" – Cardi B feat. Megan Thee Stallion (4 weeks)
- "Watermelon Sugar" – Harry Styles (1 week)
- "Willow" – Taylor Swift (1 week)

=== Billboard Hot 100 Top 20 Hits ===
All songs that reached the Top 20 on the Billboard Hot 100 chart during the year, complete with peak chart placement.

- "10,000 Hours" – Dan + Shay and Justin Bieber (#4 in 2019, #5 in 2020)
- "34+35" – Ariana Grande (#8)
- "7 Summers" – Morgan Wallen (#6)
- "A Holly Jolly Christmas" – Burl Ives (#4)
- "Adore You" – Harry Styles (#6)
- "After Hours" – The Weeknd (#20)
- "All I Want for Christmas Is You" – Mariah Carey (#1)
- "Baby Pluto" – Lil Uzi Vert (#6)
- "Bad Energy" – Juice Wrld (#16)
- "Bad Guy" – Billie Eilish (#1 in 2019, #14 in 2020)
- "Ballin'" – Mustard feat. Roddy Ricch (#11)
- "Be Like That" – Kane Brown, Swae Lee and Khalid (#19)
- "Bean (Kobe)" – Lil Uzi Vert feat. Chief Keef (#19)
- "Before You Go" – Lewis Capaldi (#9)
- "Blinding Lights" – The Weeknd (#1)
- "Blood on My Jeans" – Juice Wrld (#12)
- "Blue & Grey" – BTS (#13)
- "Blueberry Faygo" – Lil Mosey (#8)
- "Body" – Megan Thee Stallion (#12)
- "Bop" – DaBaby (#11 in 2019, #12 in 2020)
- "Break My Heart" – Dua Lipa (#13)
- "Cardigan" – Taylor Swift (#1)
- "Chasin' You" – Morgan Wallen (#16)
- "Chicago Freestyle" – Drake feat. Giveon (#14)
- "Circles" – Post Malone (#1)
- "Come & Go" – Juice Wrld and Marshmello (#2)
- "Conversations" – Juice Wrld (#7)
- "Dakiti" – Bad Bunny and Jhay Cortez (#5)
- "Dance Monkey" – Tones and I (#4)
- "D4L" – Drake, Future and Young Thug (#19)
- "Does to Me" – Luke Combs feat. Eric Church (#20)
- "Don't Start Now" – Dua Lipa (#2)
- "Dreams" – Fleetwood Mac (#1 in 1977, #12 in 2020)
- "Dynamite" – BTS (#1)
- "Everything I Wanted" – Billie Eilish (#8 in 2019, #9 in 2020)
- "Exile" – Taylor Swift feat. Bon Iver (#6)
- "Falling" – Trevor Daniel (#17)
- "Feliz Navidad" – José Feliciano (#10)
- "For the Night" – Pop Smoke feat. Lil Baby and DaBaby (#6)
- "Forever After All" – Luke Combs (#2)
- "Franchise" – Travis Scott feat. Young Thug and M.I.A. (#1)
- "Glock in My Lap" – 21 Savage and Metro Boomin (#19)
- "Go Crazy" – Chris Brown and Young Thug (#9)
- "Godzilla" – Eminem feat. Juice Wrld (#3)
- "Gooba" – 6ix9ine (#3)
- "Good as Hell" – Lizzo (#3 in 2019, #6 in 2020)
- "Good News" – Mac Miller (#17)
- "Got What I Got" – Jason Aldean (#16)
- "Greece" – DJ Khaled feat. Drake (#8)
- "Hate the Other Side" – Juice Wrld and Marshmello feat. Polo G and The Kid Laroi (#10)
- "Hawái" – Maluma and The Weeknd (#12)
- "Heartless" – The Weeknd (#1 in 2019, #4 in 2020)
- "Heatin Up" – Lil Baby feat. Gunna (#18)
- "High Fashion" – Roddy Ricch feat. Mustard (#20)
- "Highest in the Room" – Travis Scott (#1 in 2019, #8 in 2020)
- "Holy" – Justin Bieber feat. Chance the Rapper (#3)
- "Hot Girl Bummer" – Blackbear (#11)
- "I Hope" – Gabby Barrett feat. Charlie Puth (#3)
- "I Love Me" – Demi Lovato (#18)
- "Ice Cream" – Blackpink and Selena Gomez (#13)
- "In Your Eyes" – The Weeknd (#16)
- "Intentions" – Justin Bieber feat. Quavo (#5)
- "It's Beginning to Look a Lot Like Christmas" – Perry Como and The Fontane Sisters with Mitchell Ayres and His Orchestra (#12)
- "It's the Most Wonderful Time of the Year" – Andy Williams (#6)
- "Jingle Bell Rock" – Bobby Helms (#3)
- "Jump" – DaBaby feat. YoungBoy Never Broke Again (#17)
- "Kings & Queens" – Ava Max (#13)
- "Last Christmas" – Wham! (#11)
- "Laugh Now Cry Later" – Drake feat. Lil Durk (#2)
- "Lemonade" – Internet Money and Gunna feat. Don Toliver and Nav (#6)
- "Let It Snow, Let It Snow, Let It Snow" − Dean Martin (#11)
- "Levitating" – Dua Lipa feat. DaBaby (#20)
- "Life Goes On" – BTS (#1)
- "Life Is Good" – Future feat. Drake (#2)
- "Life's a Mess" – Juice Wrld and Halsey (#9)
- "Lo Mein" – Lil Uzi Vert (#8)
- "Lonely" – Justin Bieber and Benny Blanco (#14)
- "Lose You to Love Me" – Selena Gomez (#1 in 2019, #5 in 2020)
- "Memories" – Maroon 5 (#2)
- "Midnight Sky" – Miley Cyrus (#14)
- "Monster" – Shawn Mendes and Justin Bieber (#8)
- "Mood" – 24kGoldn feat. Iann Dior (#1)
- "Mood Swings" – Pop Smoke feat. Lil Tjay (#17)
- "More Than My Hometown" – Morgan Wallen (#15)
- "Move Ya Hips" – ASAP Ferg feat. Nicki Minaj and MadeinTYO (#19)
- "Mr. Right Now" – 21 Savage and Metro Boomin feat. Drake (#10)
- "My Future" – Billie Eilish (#6)
- "My Oh My" – Camila Cabello feat. DaBaby (#12)
- "My Tears Ricochet" – Taylor Swift (#16)
- "Myron" – Lil Uzi Vert (#13)
- "No Guidance" – Chris Brown feat. Drake (#5 in 2019, #15 in 2020)
- "No Time to Die" – Billie Eilish (#16)
- "Nobody but You" – Blake Shelton and Gwen Stefani (#18)
- "Old Town Road" – Lil Nas X feat. Billy Ray Cyrus (#1 in 2019, #15 in 2020)
- "On" – BTS (#4)
- "One Margarita" – Luke Bryan (#19)
- "One of Them Girls" – Lee Brice (#17)
- "P2" – Lil Uzi Vert (#11)
- "Pain 1993" – Drake feat. Playboi Carti (#7)
- "Panini" – Lil Nas X (#5 in 2019, #17 in 2020)
- "Popstar" – DJ Khaled feat. Drake (#3)
- "Positions" – Ariana Grande (#1)
- "Rags2Riches" – Rod Wave feat. ATR Son Son (#12)
- "Rain on Me" – Lady Gaga and Ariana Grande (#1)
- "Righteous" – Juice Wrld (#11)
- "Rockin' Around the Christmas Tree" – Brenda Lee (#2)
- "Rockstar" – DaBaby feat. Roddy Ricch (#1)
- "Roses (Imanbek remix)" – Saint Jhn (#4)
- "Roxanne" – Arizona Zervas (#4 in 2019, #5 in 2020)
- "Runnin" – 21 Savage and Metro Boomin (#9)
- "Said Sum" – Moneybagg Yo (#17)
- "Savage" – Megan Thee Stallion feat. Beyoncé (#1)
- "Savage Love (Laxed – Siren Beat)" – Jawsh 685, Jason Derulo and BTS (#1)
- "Say So" – Doja Cat feat. Nicki Minaj (#1)
- "Señorita" – Shawn Mendes and Camila Cabello (#1 in 2019, #11 in 2020)
- "Silly Watch" – Lil Uzi Vert (#9)
- "Sleigh Ride" − The Ronettes (#19)
- "Smile" – Juice Wrld and The Weeknd (#8)
- "Someone You Loved" – Lewis Capaldi (#1 in 2019, #4 in 2020)
- "Stuck with U" – Ariana Grande and Justin Bieber (#1)
- "Stupid Love" – Lady Gaga (#5)
- "Suicidal" – YNW Melly and Juice Wrld (#20)
- "Sum 2 Prove" – Lil Baby (#16)
- "Sunday Best" – Surfaces (#19)
- "Tap In" – Saweetie (#20)
- "That Way" – Lil Uzi Vert (#20)
- "The 1" – Taylor Swift (#4)
- "The Bigger Picture" – Lil Baby (#3)
- "The Bones" – Maren Morris (#12)
- "The Box" – Roddy Ricch (#1)
- "The Christmas Song (Merry Christmas to You)" − Nat King Cole (#11 in 2019, #15 in 2020)
- "The Last Great American Dynasty" – Taylor Swift (#13)
- "The Scotts" – The Scotts, Travis Scott and Kid Cudi (#1)
- "The Woo" – Pop Smoke feat. 50 Cent and Roddy Ricch (#11)
- "Therefore I Am" – Billie Eilish (#2)
- "Titanic" – Juice Wrld (#14)
- "Toosie Slide" – Drake (#1)
- "Trampoline" – Shaed (#13 in 2019, #16 in 2020)
- "Trollz" – 6ix9ine and Nicki Minaj (#1)
- "Truth Hurts" – Lizzo (#1 in 2019, #18 in 2020)
- "Turks" – Nav, Gunna and Travis Scott (#17)
- "WAP" – Cardi B feat. Megan Thee Stallion (#1)
- "Watermelon Sugar" – Harry Styles (#1)
- "We Paid" – Lil Baby and 42 Dugg (#10)
- "What a Man Gotta Do" – Jonas Brothers (#16)
- "Whats Poppin" – Jack Harlow feat. DaBaby, Tory Lanez and Lil Wayne (#2)
- "Willow" – Taylor Swift (#1)
- "Wishing Well" – Juice Wrld (#5)
- "Woah" – Lil Baby (#15)
- "Wonder" – Shawn Mendes (#18)
- "Yummy" – Justin Bieber (#2)

== Deaths ==
- January 1 –
  - Lexii Alijai, 21, rapper
  - Marty Grebb, 74, rock keyboardist
  - Tommy Hancock, 90, country singer
- January 2 – Lorraine Chandler, 73, soul singer
- January 8 – Edd Byrnes, 87, actor and pop singer
- January 9 – Bobby Comstock, 78, rock and roll singer
- January 14 – Steve Martin Caro, 71, singer
- January 15 – Chris Darrow, 75, country and rock singer
- January 18 – David Olney, 71, folk singer-songwriter
- January 19 –
  - Jimmy Heath, 93, jazz saxophonist
  - Robert Parker, 89, R&B singer
- January 24 –
  - Joe Payne, 35, metal bassist
  - Sean Reinert, 48, metal drummer
- January 25 –
  - Bob Gullotti, 71, free jazz drummer
  - Vernon Sandusky, 80, rock singer and guitarist (The Chartbusters)
- January 26 – Bob Shane, 85, folk singer and guitarist
- January 28 – Bob Nave, 75, bubblegum pop keyboardist
- February 1 –
  - Harold Beane, 73, funk guitarist
  - Peter Serkin, 72, classical pianist
- February 6 – Diego Farias, 27, progressive metalcore guitarist
- February 10 – Lyle Mays, 66, jazz fusion keyboardist
- February 12 – Paul English, 87, country drummer
- February 13 –
  - Jacob Thiele, 40, indie rock keyboardist
  - Buzzy Linhart, 76, folk singer-songwriter
- February 19 –
  - Bob Cobert, 95, composer
  - Pop Smoke, 20, rapper
- February 25 – David Roback, 61, alternative rock and dream pop guitarist
- February 28 – Mike Sommerville, 67, rock guitarist and songwriter
- March 3 – Les Cauchi, 77, pop singer (Johnny Maestro & the Brooklyn Bridge)
- March 4 – Barbara Martin, 76, R&B singer
- March 6 –
  - McCoy Tyner, 81, jazz pianist
  - Elinor Ross, 93, opera soprano
- March 7 – Jim Owen, 78, country singer songwriter
- March 9 –
  - Keith Olson, 74, rock bassist, record producer
  - Eric Taylor, 70, folk singer songwriter
- March 11 – Charles Wuorinen, 81, classical composer
- March 16 – Jason Rainey, 53, thrash metal guitarist
- March 20 –
  - Kenny Rogers, 81, country singer-songwriter, actor
  - Jerry Slick, 80, rock drummer
- March 22
  - Mike Longo, 83, jazz pianist
  - Eric Weissberg, 80, country and bluegrass banjoist
- March 23 – Tres Warren, 41, rock singer and guitarist
- March 25 – Bill Rieflin, 59, rock drummer
- March 28 – Jan Howard, 91, country singer songwriter
- March 29 –
  - Joe Diffie, 61, country singer
  - Alan Merrill, 69, rock singer and bassist
- March 30 – Bill Withers, 81, soul and R&B singer-songwriter
- March 31 – Cristina, 61, no wave singer
- April 1 –
  - Ellis Marsalis Jr., 85, jazz pianist
  - Adam Schlesinger, 52, singer-songwriter, record producer, guitarist
  - Bucky Pizzarelli, 94, jazz guitarist
- April 2 – Vaughan Mason, 69, funk musician (Vaughan Mason & Crew, Raze)
- April 4 -
  - Timothy Brown, 82, pop and soul singer
  - Alex Harvey, 73, country singer songwriter
- April 7 –
  - Betty Bennett, 98, jazz and big band singer
  - Hutch Davie, 89, pianist, arranger and composer
  - Steve Farmer, 71, rock guitarist, songwriter (The Amboy Dukes)
  - Travis Nelsen, 38, indie rock drummer
  - John Prine, 73, country folk singer-songwriter
  - Hal Willner, 64, record producer
- April 8 –
  - Carl Dobkins, Jr., 79, singer and songwriter
  - Chynna Rogers, 25, rapper
- April 9 – Andrew Gonzalez, 69, Latin jazz bassist
- April 10 –
  - Big George Brock, 87, blues harmonicist
  - Jymie Merritt, 92, jazz bassist
- April 15 –
  - Lee Konitz, 92, jazz saxophonist
  - Henry Grimes, 84, jazz bassist
  - Gary McSpadden, 77, gospel singer, songwriter, producer
- April 17 – Giuseppi Logan, 84, jazz instrumentalist
- April 21 – Derek Jones, 35, metalcore guitarist
- April 24 –
  - Hamilton Bohannon, 78, percussionist and music producer
  - Harold Reid, 80, country singer songwriter
- April 25 – Alan Abel, 91, classical percussionist
- April 26 – Big Al Carson, 66, blues singer
- April 27 –
  - Troy Sneed, 52, gospel singer
  - Lynn Harrell, 79, classical cellist
- April 28 – Bobby Lewis, 95, R&B singer
- April 29 – Stezo, 51, rapper
- April 30 – Sam Lloyd, 56, a cappella singer
- May 1 – Richard Cole, 72, jazz saxophonist
- May 2 – Cady Groves, 30, country singer-songwriter
- May 3 – Rosalind Elias, 90, opera singer
- May 4
  - John Erhardt, 58, indie rock musician
  - Frederick C. Tillis, 90, jazz saxophonist
- May 5 –
  - Sweet Pea Atkinson, 74, dance rock singer
  - Sonny Cox, 82, jazz saxophonist
  - Kiing Shooter, 24, rapper
- May 8 – Andre Harrell, 59, record producer, songwriter, and rapper
- May 9 – Little Richard, 87, R&B, soul, and rock-n-roll singer
- May 10 – Betty Wright, 66, R&B soul singer
- May 11 – Moon Martin, 74, rockabilly singer-songwriter and guitarist
- May 17 – Lucky Peterson, 55, blues guitarist
- May 19 – Willie K, 59, folk ukuleleist
- May 22 –
  - Steve Hanford, 50, punk rock drummer
  - KJ Balla, 23, rapper
- May 24 –
  - Jimmy Cobb, 91, jazz drummer
  - Al Rex, 91, rock & roll bassist
- May 25 – Bucky Baxter, 65, folk and rock guitarist
- May 26 – Lennie Niehaus, 90, jazz saxophonist and film composer
- May 28 – Bob Kulick, 70, hard rock guitarist (Balance, Kiss, W.A.S.P.)
- May 31 – Bob Northern, 86, jazz French hornist
- June 1 – Joey Image, 63, punk rock drummer
- June 2 – Chris Trousdale, 34, pop singer and actor
- June 7 –
  - Frank Bey, 74, blues singer
  - Floyd Lee, 86, blues singer and guitarist
- June 8 –
  - James Hand, 67, country singer
  - Bonnie Pointer, 69, R&B soul singer (The Pointer Sisters)
- June 24 – Michael Hawley, 58, classical pianist
- June 26 – Huey, 31, rapper
- June 27 –
  - Pete Carr, 70, rock, pop, and soul guitarist
  - Freddy Cole, 88, jazz singer and pianist
  - Tom Finn, 71, baroque pop guitarist
- June 29 –
  - Stepa J. Groggs, 32, rapper (Injury Reserve)
  - Johnny Mandel, 94, film composer, arranger
  - Benny Mardones, 73, soft rock singer, songwriter
- July 1 – Max Crook, 83, pop rock keyboardist
- July 3 – J. Marvin Brown, 66, soul singer
- July 5 – Cleveland Eaton, 80, jazz bassist
- July 6 – Charlie Daniels, 83, country singer
- July 8 – Naya Rivera, 33, pop singer and actress (Glee)
- July 10 – Eddie Gale, 78, jazz trumpeter
- July 12 –
  - Rod Bernard, 79, swamp pop singer
  - Eleanor Sokoloff, 106, classical pianist
- July 16 – Jamie Oldaker, 68, country music drummer
- July 19 – Emitt Rhodes, 70, pop rock singer
- July 27 – Miss Mercy, 71, psychedelic rock singer
- July 29 – Malik B., 47, rapper (The Roots)
- July 31 – Bill Mack, 88, country singer-songwriter
- August 2 –
  - Steve Holland, 66, southern rock guitarist
  - Larry Novak, 87, jazz pianist
  - Leon Fleisher, 92, classical pianist
- August 4
  - Tony Costanza, 52, heavy metal drummer
  - FBG Duck, rapper
- August 6 – Vern Rumsey, 47, indie rock bassist
- August 11 – Trini Lopez, 83, pop singer
- August 13 – Steve Grossman, 69, jazz fusion saxophonist
- August 18 –
  - Ron Heathman, rock guitarist (The Supersuckers)
  - Hal Singer, 100, jazz saxophonist and bandleader
- August 19 –
  - Todd Nance, 57, jam band drummer
  - Randall Craig Fleischer, 61, classical conductor
- August 20 – Frankie Banali, 68, rock drummer (Quiet Riot)
- August 22 –
  - Walter Lure, 71, punk rock guitarist
  - D.J. Rogers, 72, soul singer
- August 23 –
  - Justin Townes Earle, 38, singer-songwriter
  - Peter King, 80, jazz saxophonist and clarinetist
  - Charlie Persip, 91, jazz drummer
- August 24 – Riley Gale, 35, thrash metal singer (Power Trip)
- September 3 – Bill Pursell, 94, composer
- September 4 – Gary Peacock, 85, jazz double-bassist
- September 6 – Bruce Williamson, 49, R&B singer
- September 8 – Simone Coxe, 82, electronic rock singer
- September 9 –
  - Ronald Bell, 68, saxophonist (Kool & The Gang)
  - Sid McCray, punk rock singer
- September 12 – Edna Wright, 76, R&B singer
- September 14 – Al Kasha, 83, pop songwriter
- September 16 – Roy C, 81, soul singer
- September 18 –
  - Georgia Dobbins, 78, R&B singer
  - Pamela Hutchinson, 62, R&B singer (The Emotions)
- September 21 –
  - Tommy DeVito, 92, singer, guitarist (The Four Seasons)
  - Roy Head, 79, country singer
- September 23 – W.S. Holland, 85, country music dummer
- September 26 – Mark Stone, hard rock bassist
- September 29
  - Mac Davis, 78, country singer
  - Rocco Prestia, 69, funk bassist
- October 6 –
  - Eddie Van Halen, 65, rock guitarist, songwriter (Van Halen)
  - Johnny Nash, 80 singer, songwriter
- October 7 – Ray Pennington, 86, country singer songwriter
- October 9 – Pierre Kezdy, 58, punk rock bassist
- October 11 – Harold Betters, 92, jazz trombonist
- October 12 –
  - Jon Gibson, 80, minimalist multi instrumentalist
  - Kim Massie, 62, blues and soul singer
- October 13 – Saint Dog, 44, rapper
- October 16 – Johnny Bush, 85, country music singer songwriter
- October 18 – Chet "JR" White, 40, indie rock bassist
- October 21 – Viola Smith, 107, swing and classical drummer
- October 22 – Margie Bowes, 79, country singer
- October 23 – Jerry Jeff Walker, 78, country singer songwriter
- October 26 – Stan Kesler, 92, rock and roll singer, songwriter
- October 28 – Billy Joe Shaver, 81, country singer, songwriter
- October 31 –
  - MF Doom, 49, rapper
  - Rance Allen, 71, gospel singer, guitarist and keyboardist
- November 1 – Nikki McKibbin, 42, singer, American Idol season one third place finalist
- November 5 – Len Barry, 78, soul singer
- November 6 – King Von, 26, rapper
- November 10 – Alec Baillie, 73, bassist
- November 11 –
  - Andrew White, jazz saxophonist
  - MO3, 28, rapper
- November 12 – Jim Tucker, 74, rock guitarist
- November 13 – Doug Supernaw, 60, country singer
- November 16 – Bruce Swedien, 86, recording engineer
- November 23 – Hal Ketchum, 67, country singer
- November 25 – Camilla Wicks, 92, classical violinist
- December 7 –
  - LD Beghtol, 55, experimental rock singer
  - Howard Wales, 77, jazz and rock keyboardist
- December 8 – Harold Budd, 84, avant-garde composer and poet
- December 9 –
  - Sean Malone, 50, progressive metal bassist (Cynic)
  - Jason Slater, 49, alternative rock bassist
- December 12 – Charley Pride, 86, country singer
- December 15 – Sam Jayne, 46, indie rock singer and guitarist
- December 16 – Carl Mann, 78, rockabilly singer
- December 17 –
  - Jeff Clayton, 66, jazz saxophonist
  - Stanley Cowell, 79, jazz pianist
- December 19 – Clay Anthony, 61, hard rock bassist
- December 21 – K.T. Oslin, 78, country singer
- December 23
  - John Fletcher, 56, rapper
  - Leslie West, 75, hard rock singer and guitarist
- December 25 – Tony Rice, 69, bluegrass guitarist
- December 29 –
  - Phyllis McGuire, 89, pop singer (The McGuire Sisters)
  - Rudy Salas, 71, R&B and soul guitarist
- December 30 –
  - Frank Kimbrough, 64, jazz pianist
  - Alto Reed, 72, rock saxophonist
  - Eugene Wright, 97, jazz bassist

== See also ==
- 2020s in music
