= Lil Uzi Vert vs. the World 2 =

2020 reissue by Lil Uzi Vert

Studio album (reissue) (Note: Released as part of the deluxe reissue of Lil Uzi Vert's second studio album Eternal Atake (2020).) by Lil Uzi Vert
- Released: March 13, 2020
- Recorded: 2016–2020
- Genre: Trap
- Length: 42:44
- Label: Generation Now; Atlantic
- Producer: Brandon Finessin; Cash; Danny Wolf; Don Cannon; DY; Kid808; Kid Wond3r; Lyle LeDuff; Money Musik; Nav; Oogie Mane; Outtatown; Pi'erre Bourne; Pro Logic; Supah Mario; Treshaun Beats; Wheezy

Lil Uzi Vert chronology
Eternal Atake (2020)	Lil Uzi Vert vs. the World 2 (2020)	Pluto × Baby Pluto (2020)

Lil Uzi Vert vs. the World 2 (Note: The full title of the album is Eternal Atake (Deluxe) - LUV vs. the World 2.) is a reissue studio album by American rapper and singer Lil Uzi Vert. It was released through Generation Now and Atlantic Records on March 13, 2020. The album was released as the deluxe edition of their second studio album Eternal Atake, which was released a week earlier, on March 6, 2020. The album features guest appearances from Chief Keef, 21 Savage, Future, Young Thug, Gunna, Lil Durk, Young Nudy and Nav. The production was handled by Cash, Don Cannon, Nav, Pi'erre Bourne, and Wheezy, among others. The album also serves as a sequel to Lil Uzi Vert's third mixtape Lil Uzi Vert vs. the World (2016), which was released 4 years earlier.

Lil Uzi Vert vs. the World 2 debuted at number one on the US Billboard 200, garnering 247,000 album-equivalent units in its first week. The deluxe edition's release helped the original album to maintain its number-one position on the Billboard 200 for a second week, since both versions of the album were counted together for tracking purposes.

== Background and release ==
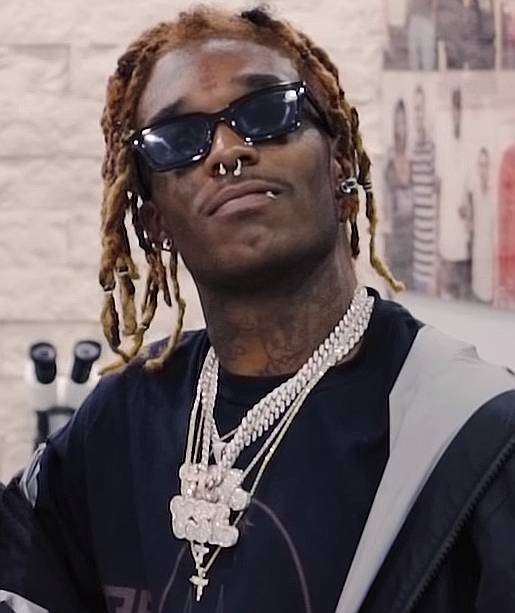
Lil Uzi Vert took nearly two years to release Eternal Atake; however the album's deluxe edition was released within a week.

In September 2017, soon after the release of their debut studio album Luv Is Rage 2, Lil Uzi Vert teased that they were working on a song for a sequel to their 2016 mixtape Lil Uzi Vert vs. the World. On July 31, 2018, they teased an upcoming album titled Eternal Atake. However, the album was continuously delayed for a year and a half. Eternal Atake was finally released on March 6, 2020. Soon after the long-awaited release of Eternal Atake, Uzi teased a deluxe version of their album on Twitter.

In the following days, Uzi teased that eight songs were going on the deluxe version of their album. On March 12, 2020, they revealed that 14 songs were going on the album. It was revealed shortly after that the tracks for their "deluxe album" were going to be on a separate album titled Lil Uzi Vert vs. the World 2, serving as a "second part" to Eternal Atake as well as the successor to Lil Uzi Vert vs. the World. Like its predecessor Lil Uzi Vert vs. the World, the cover art for the album is inspired by Canadian graphic novel series Scott Pilgrim. Chris Mench wrote for Genius that collaborations with Young Thug, Juice Wrld, and A Boogie wit da Hoodie were expected on the album. Lil Uzi Vert vs. the World 2 was released on March 13, 2020 at 8:00 AM EST. The album features multiple guest artists in comparison to the original Eternal Atake that contained a sole guest feature from American singer Syd. Brendan Klinkenberg of Rolling Stone wrote that while "Eternal Atake was all but devoid of features [...] its sister album has a murderer’s row of guest appearances."

== Critical reception ==
Professional ratings
Review scores
Source	Rating
Pitchfork	6.9/10

Mehan Jayasuriya of Pitchfork reviewed Lil Uzi Vert vs. the World 2 separately from Eternal Atake. (Note: Alphonse Pierre of Pitchfork gave the standard edition of Eternal Atake an 8.4/10 rating.) Jayasuriya stated that Lil Uzi Vert vs. the World 2 was closer to a deluxe edition than a separate album, describing the album as a "cobbled-together collection of B-sides", but good ones nonetheless. Jayasuriya praised "Lotus", "Myron", "Bean (Kobe)" with Chief Keef and "Got the Guap" with Young Thug as the high points of the album. However, Jayasuriya noted that "some of LUV vs. The World 2's collaborations sounded better on paper" including Future, Gunna, and Nav.

== Commercial performance ==
Lil Uzi Vert vs. the World 2 debuted at number one on the US Billboard 200, earning 247,000 album-equivalent units in its first week. The deluxe edition's release helped the original album to maintain its number-one position on the Billboard 200 for a second week, since both versions of the album were counted together for tracking purposes.

== Track listing ==
Songwriting credits adapted from Billboard.

Lil Uzi Vert vs. the World 2
No.	Title	Writer(s)	Producer(s)	Length
1.	"Myron"	Symere Woods; Jordan Ortiz; Jonathan Priester	Oogie Mane; Supah Mario	3:45
2.	"Lotus"	Woods; Ortiz; Donald Cannon; Treshaun Beats	Don Cannon; Oogie Mane; Treshaun Beats	3:13
3.	"Bean (Kobe)" (featuring Chief Keef)	Woods; Keith Cozart; Jordan Jenks	Pi'erre Bourne	3:58
4.	"Yessirskiii" (with 21 Savage)	Woods; Shéyaa Bin Abraham-Joseph; Jenks	Pi'erre Bourne	3:39
5.	"Wassup" (featuring Future)	Woods; Nayvadius Wilburn; Jenks	Pi'erre Bourne	3:13
6.	"Strawberry Peels" (featuring Young Thug and Gunna)	Woods; Jeffery Williams; Sergio Kitchens; Wesley Glass	Wheezy	1:55
7.	"I Can Show You"	Woods; Ortiz	Oogie Mane	2:00
8.	"Moon Relate"	Woods; Miguel Curtidor	Danny Wolf; Kid808	3:01
9.	"Come This Way"	Woods; Lyle LeDuff; Nicole Miglis; Paul Garonzik; Trayer Tryon; Zachary Tetreault	LeDuff	2:52
10.	"Trap This Way (This Way)"	Woods; Ortiz	Oogie Mane	3:05
11.	"No Auto" (featuring Lil Durk)	Woods; Durk Banks; Dwan Avery; Anthony Beecham	DY; Kid Wond3r	2:15
12.	"Money Spread" (featuring Young Nudy)	Woods; Quantavious Thomas; Jenks	Pi'erre Bourne	3:37
13.	"Got the Guap" (featuring Young Thug)	Woods; Williams; Brandon Veal; Tobias Dekker	Brandon Finessin; Outtatown	2:56
14.	"Leaders" (featuring Nav)	Woods; Navraj Goraya; Amir Esmailian; Andrew Franklin; Mohkom Bhangal	Nav; Cash; Pro Logic; Money Musik	3:15
Total length:				42:44

Eternal Atake - Baby Pluto
No.	Title	Writer(s)	Producer(s)	Length
1.	"Baby Pluto"	Woods; Veal; Daniel Perez; Vincent DeLon; Ivison Smith	Brandon Finessin; Bugz Ronin; Cousin Vinny; Ike Beatz	3:30
2.	"Lo Mein"	Woods; Veal; Perez	Brandon Finessin; Bugz Ronin	3:15
3.	"Silly Watch"	Woods; Jonathan Priester	Supah Mario	3:16
4.	"Pop"	Woods; Veal; Jordan Ortiz	Brandon Finessin; Oogie Mane	3:47
5.	"You Better Move"	Woods; Veal	Brandon Finessin; Nick Seeley	3:17
6.	"Homecoming"	Woods; Perez	Bugz Ronin	3:34

Renji
No.	Title	Writer(s)	Producer(s)	Length
7.	"I'm Sorry"	Woods; Veal; Anton Mendo	Brandon Finessin; Starboy	3:32
8.	"Celebration Station"	Woods; Veal; Tobias Dekker	Brandon Finessin; Outtatown	3:15
9.	"Bigger Than Life"	Woods; Ortiz; Dylan Cleary-Krell	Oogie Mane; Dez Wright	3:13
10.	"Chrome Heart Tags"	Woods; Keith Cozart	Chief Keef	3:33
11.	"Bust Me"	Woods; Perez	Bugz Ronin	3:14
12.	"Prices"	Woods; Harold Harper; Jacques Webster II; Rogét Chahayed; Scott Mescudi; Kasseem Dean; Magnus Høiberg; Chauncey Hollis, Jr.; Brittany Hazzard; Carlton Mays, Jr.	Harper	3:53

Lil Uzi Vert
No.	Title	Writer(s)	Producer(s)	Length
13.	"Urgency" (featuring Syd)	Woods; Sydney Bennett; Nicholas Eaholtz; Wesley Glass; Robert Richardson	Wheezy; Bobby Raps	3:01
14.	"Venetia"	Woods; Veal; Dekker	Brandon Finessin; Outtatown	3:09
15.	"Secure the Bag"	Woods; Perez	Bugz Ronin	3:58
16.	"P2"	Woods; Bryan Simmons	TM88	3:55
17.	"Futsal Shuffle 2020" (bonus track)	Woods; Veal; Mendo; Mees van der Bruggen; Cas van der Heijden	Brandon Finessin; Starboy; Mayyzo; Loesoe	3:19
18.	"That Way" (bonus track)	Woods; Priester; Andres Espana; Milan Modi; Andreas Carlsson; Max Martin	Supah Mario; Felipe S; Yung Lan	3:32
Total length:				105:02

Notes

- "Pop" is stylized in all capital letters

Sample credits

- "You Better Move" contains elements of the video game Full Tilt! Pinball.
- "Celebration Station" contains a sample of "Raindrops (An Angel Cried)", as performed by Ariana Grande.
- "Prices" contains a sample of "Way Back", written by Jacques Webster, Rogét Chahayed, Scott Mescudi, Kasseem Dean, Magnus Høiberg, Chauncey Hollis, Jr., Brittany Hazzard, and Carlton Mays, Jr., as performed by Travis Scott; and an interpolation of "Hickory Dickory Dock".
- "P2" contains a sample of "XO Tour Llif3", as performed by Lil Uzi Vert.
- "Futsal Shuffle 2020" contains audio samples from Nardwuar and a live rendition of "Boredom", as performed by Tyler, the Creator.
- "That Way" contains interpolations from "I Want It That Way", written by Andreas Carlsson and Max Martin, as performed by the Backstreet Boys.

== Charts ==
Sales chart performance for Lil Uzi Vert vs. the World 2
Chart (2020)	Peak position
Estonian Albums (Eesti Tipp-40)	2
Finnish Albums (Suomen virallinen lista)	19
Norwegian Albums (VG-lista)	2
Swedish Albums (Sverigetopplistan)	36
