= Sasuke (song) =

Single by Lil Uzi Vert
- Released: April 24, 2020
- Genre: Trap
- Length: 4:11
- Label: Atlantic
- Songwriter: Symere Woods
- Producers: Brandon Finessin; Outtatown

Lil Uzi Vert singles chronology
"That Way" (2020)	"Sasuke" (2020)	"Count a Million" (2020)

Audio video
- "Sasuke" on YouTube

"Sasuke" is a song by American rapper Lil Uzi Vert. It was released on April 24, 2020 as a standalone single. It peaked at number 65 on the Billboard Hot 100.

The track's title is a reference to the Naruto character Sasuke Uchiha, which Uzi also references multiple times in the track. The track is their first single as a lead artist since the release of their album Lil Uzi Vert vs. the World 2, which was released on March 13, 2020, and is the deluxe edition of their second studio album Eternal Atake, which was released a week earlier.

== Critical reception ==
The track received mixed-to-negative reviews. Diego Ramos of Daily Trojan gave the track two stars out of five, saying that the track "falls short of expectations", and said that the song "does have a [Playboi] Carti-esque nature, but it also sounds like a generic Uzi song", with "references to fashion, sexual innuendos and cars in the typical Uzi delivery" that "make for nothing special". Marcus Pruitt of AudiblWav said that the track "doesn’t bring quite the same punch as other tracks [they] released earlier this year", saying that the song "opened up with a ton of potential, but fell flat as it progressed". The song also garnered negative reactions from fans.

== Commercial performance ==
The track debuted at number 65 on the Billboard Hot 100, failing to match the commercial success of their previous single, "That Way".

== Controversy ==
The track was the subject of controversy between their beef with rapper Playboi Carti, with Uzi allegedly dissing him on the track. They denied dissing Carti.

== Charts ==
Chart (2020)	Peak position
Canada (Canadian Hot 100)	79
New Zealand Hot Singles (RMNZ)	10
US Billboard Hot 100	65
US Hot R&B/Hip-Hop Songs (Billboard)	29
US Hot Rap Songs (Billboard)	24
US Rolling Stone Top 100	32
