= Yessirskiii =

2020 song by Lil Uzi Vert featuring 21 Savage

Song by Lil Uzi Vert and 21 Savage

from the album Lil Uzi Vert vs. the World 2
- Released: March 13, 2020
- Recorded: 2019
- Genre: Trap
- Length: 3:39
- Label: Record Label: Generation Now; Atlantic
- Songwriters: Symere Woods; Shéyaa Abraham-Joseph; Jordan Jenks
- Producer: Pi'erre Bourne

"Yessirskiii" is a song by American rapper Lil Uzi Vert and British-American rapper 21 Savage. It was released on March 13, 2020, as the fourth track from Lil Uzi Vert vs. the World 2, the deluxe edition of Uzi's second studio album Eternal Atake (2020), and was produced by Pi'erre Bourne.

== Composition and critical reception ==
Andre Gee of Uproxx wrote of the song, "21's drawl melodically wafts through the beginning of the Pi'erre Bourne-produced track, eschewing much of his usual intimidation for hilarious (and timely) quotables like, 'Y'all n****s can't join my live / I ain't givin' no high fives' and 'I don't go to church, I curse' over buoyant synths. Uzi provides a jolt of aggression after the methodical opener and causes 21 to jump into his own double-time bag on the second verse. Even though 21 technically has more verses on the track, Uzi shifts the track's energy, and more importantly, the lyrical tone and debaucherous lyrics fit the overall vibe of the syrupy, ever-quaking soundscape."

== Cultural impact ==
The song popularized the use of the titular phrase in hip hop music. On September 30, 2020, Lil Pump shared via Instagram a snippet of a track of the same name, in which he repeatedly says "yessirskiii" on the hook. American rapper Doe Boy also released a song titled "Yessirski". On October 5, 2020, 21 Savage responded on Twitter, "I need 50 percent of every song that come out with a yessirskiii hook y'all getting outrageous with da biting I gotta get a rabies shot at dis point". In response, Doe Boy tweeted "Damn Pump owe 50% for 'Yessirski'" and "Ion owe nobody shit... End of story".

== Charts ==
| Chart (2020) | Peak position |
|---|---|
| Canada Hot 100 (Billboard) | 88 |
| New Zealand Hot Singles (RMNZ) | 11 |
| US Billboard Hot 100 | 26 |
| US Hot R&B/Hip-Hop Songs (Billboard) | 14 |

== Certifications ==
| Region | Certification | Certified units/sales |
|---|---|---|
| United States (RIAA) | Platinum | 1,000,000^{‡} |
^{‡} Sales+streaming figures based on certification alone.
