= Twilight Override =

Studio album by Jeff Tweedy
- Released: September 26, 2025
- Studio: The Loft (Chicago)
- Length: 111:35
- Label: dBpm
- Producer: Tom Schick; Jeff Tweedy

Jeff Tweedy chronology
Love Is the King (2020)	Twilight Override (2025)

Singles from Twilight Override
- 1. "One Tiny Flower" Released: July 15, 2025; 2. "Out in the Dark" Released: July 15, 2025; 3. "Stray Cats in Spain" Released: July 15, 2025; 4. "Enough" Released: July 15, 2025; 5. "Feel Free" Released: August 19, 2025; 6. "Lou Reed Was My Babysitter" Released: September 12, 2025

Twilight Override is the fifth solo studio album by American musician Jeff Tweedy, released on September 26, 2025, via dBpm Records. It is a triple album.

== Background and recording ==
Twilight Override is a triple album featuring 30 songs. It follows Tweedy's 2020 album Love Is the King. It was recorded at his Chicago studio, the Loft. It features contributions from James Elkington, Finom's Sima Cunningham and Macie Stewart, and Liam Kazar, along with Tweedy's sons, Spencer and Sammy. Tweedy's decision to record a triple album was first inspired after he listened to The Clash's Sandinista! all the way through during a road trip with his two sons.

In the album's press release, Tweedy expressed being overwhelmed by the "bottomless basket of rock bottom" of current social conditions, what he described as the "sense of decline" in the "twilight of an empire". He, however, concluded that he was unsure what exactly was "squeezing this ennui into [his] day", and described the album as his "effort to overwhelm it right back". He further credited his recent prolific output to his belief that creativity aligns oneself against destruction, consuming the "darkness".

== Release ==
Twilight Override was officially announced on July 15, 2025. Four singles were released the same day: "One Tiny Flower", "Out in the Dark", and "Stray Cats in Spain", and "Enough". The album was released on September 26, 2025, through dBpm Records. "Feel Free" was released on August 19, 2025, and "Lou Reed Was My Babysitter" was released on September 12, 2025.

Following the remaining dates on Wilco's summer 2025 tour, Tweedy will support the album with "a full-band tour" of North America in October and November 2025, followed by a tour of Europe in February 2026.

== Critical reception ==
Professional ratings
Aggregate scores
Source	Rating
Metacritic	84/100
Review scores
Source	Rating
AllMusic	4/5 stars
Clash	8/10
Exclaim!	7/10
The Line of Best Fit	8/10
Mojo	4/5 stars
Paste	8.3/10
Pitchfork	8.0/10
Record Collector	4/5 stars
Rolling Stone	4/5 stars
Uncut	8/10

Mark Deming of AllMusic gave the album four out of five stars, writing, "Twilight Override was created out of Tweedy's belief that "Creativity eats darkness," and while these songs rarely sound like they're brimming with joy, they act as an affirmation of life and hope even as they acknowledge the shadows, and it's his best and most rewarding solo album to date."

== Track listing ==
All tracks are written by Jeff Tweedy.

Disc one
No.	Title	Length
1.	"One Tiny Flower"	6:20
2.	"Caught Up in the Past"	4:23
3.	"Parking Lot"	3:53
4.	"Forever Never Ends"	3:11
5.	"Love Is for Love"	5:06
6.	"Mirror"	3:38
7.	"Secret Door"	3:14
8.	"Betrayed"	3:52
9.	"Sign of Life"	2:45
10.	"Throwaway Lines"	3:02
Total length:		39:24

Disc two
No.	Title	Length
11.	"KC Rain (No Wonder)"	2:56
12.	"Out in the Dark"	3:33
13.	"Better Song"	3:33
14.	"New Orleans"	4:36
15.	"Over My Head (Everything Goes)"	3:47
16.	"Western Clear Skies"	3:00
17.	"Blank Baby"	2:54
18.	"No One's Moving On"	4:16
19.	"Feel Free"	7:07
Total length:		35:42

Disc three
No.	Title	Length
20.	"Lou Reed Was My Babysitter"	3:19
21.	"Amar Bharati"	2:25
22.	"Wedding Cake"	1:51
23.	"Stray Cats in Spain"	3:03
24.	"Ain't It a Shame"	3:47
25.	"Twilight Override"	3:17
26.	"Too Real"	3:36
27.	"This Is How It Ends"	4:15
28.	"Saddest Eyes"	3:19
29.	"Cry Baby Cry"	4:02
30.	"Enough"	3:35
Total length:		36:29

== Personnel ==
Credits adapted from Tidal.

=== Musicians ===
- Jeff Tweedy – lead vocals (all tracks), acoustic guitar (tracks 1–16, 18–22, 24, 25, 27–30), bass (4–9, 11, 13, 18, 19, 24–27, 29, 30), electric guitar (4, 6, 7, 9, 11–14, 16–18, 20–22, 24, 25, 27, 30), piano (7, 8), 12-string guitar (13), electronic percussion (16), synthesizer programming (17), clapping (20), guitar (23)
- Liam Kazar – bass (1–3, 12, 14–18, 20, 26, 28), vocals (1, 2, 4, 14, 20–24, 26, 28), piano (1, 17), acoustic guitar (6), electric guitar (12)
- Spencer Tweedy – drums (1–9, 11–20, 22, 24, 25, 27–30), vocals (2, 4, 11–14, 17, 19, 21, 23, 24, 26, 29, 30), percussion (6, 8, 14, 17, 19, 21, 24, 25, 27–30), synthesizer (6, 8, 23, 24, 27), piano (8, 14, 17), tambourine (13)
- Sima Cunningham – piano (1–3, 7, 9, 15, 28, 29), vocals (1, 2, 4, 6–9, 11–20, 22, 23, 25, 26, 28, 29)
- Sammy Tweedy – synthesizer (1–3, 5, 6, 11, 12, 14, 15, 17, 26–28, 30), vocals (2, 4, 11, 13, 14, 17, 19, 21, 23, 24, 26, 28–30), synthesizer programming (14, 19), piano (14), vocal effects (22)
- Macie Stewart – violin (1–3, 7–15, 17, 18, 22, 24–28), vocals (1, 2, 4, 7–9, 11–29), Mellotron (2, 3), piano (7, 11, 17, 18, 23, 28, 29), synthesizer (23)
- James Elkington – electric guitar (1, 3, 6, 20, 25, 28), mandolin (8), acoustic guitar (21, 26), piano (26)

=== Technical and visuals ===
- Jeff Tweedy – production, mixing, engineering, design
- Tom Schick – production, mixing
- Stephen Marsh – mastering
- Mark Greenberg – engineering assistance
- Lawrence Azerrad – design
- Shervin Lainez – photography

== Charts ==
Chart performance for Twilight Override
Chart (2025)	Peak position
Belgian Albums (Ultratop Flanders)	109
Dutch Vinyl Albums (Dutch Charts)	21
German Rock & Metal Albums (Offizielle Top 100)	17
Scottish Albums (OCC)	68
Swiss Albums (Schweizer Hitparade)	85
UK Albums Sales (OCC)	41
UK Americana Albums (OCC)	7
US Billboard 200	192
US Americana/Folk Albums (Billboard)	11
US Top Rock & Alternative Albums (Billboard)	43
