= Lo Mein (song) =

Song by Lil Uzi Vert

from the album Eternal Atake
- Released: March 6, 2020
- Genre: Hip hop; trap
- Length: 3:15
- Label: Atlantic
- Songwriters: Symere Woods; Brandon Veal; Daniel Perez
- Producers: Brandon Finessin; Bugz Ronin

"Lo Mein" is a song by American rapper Lil Uzi Vert. It was released on March 6, 2020, as the second track off of their album Eternal Atake. The track peaked at number eight on the Billboard Hot 100.

== Background ==
The track was reportedly recorded in the middle of a Nerf gun fight. The track interpolates Future's track "The Percocet & Stripper Joint".

== Critical reception ==
Dylan Green of DJBooth had a mixed reaction to the song, saying that although the track had a "seamless transition", he called the "Asian-sounding synths" closing out the song "lame", and said a few of the lines "had NAV energy".

== Commercial performance ==
The track debuted at number eight on the Billboard Hot 100, making it the third highest-charting song from the album (behind "Baby Pluto" and "Futsal Shuffle 2020").

== Charts ==
Chart performance for "Lo Mein"
Chart (2020)	Peak position
Australia (ARIA)	85
Australia Hip Hop/R&B (ARIA)	26
Canada Hot 100 (Billboard)	34
Iceland (Tónlistinn)	36
New Zealand Hot Singles (RMNZ)	5
Portugal (AFP)	114
UK Audio Streaming (OCC)	74
UK Hip Hop/R&B (OCC)	37
US Billboard Hot 100	8
US Hot R&B/Hip-Hop Songs (Billboard)	6
US Rolling Stone Top 100	3

== Certifications ==
Certifications for "Lo Mein"
Region	Certification	Certified units/sales
Canada (Music Canada)	Platinum	80,000^{‡}
United States (RIAA)	2× Platinum	2,000,000^{‡}
^{‡} Sales+streaming figures based on certification alone.
