= Outgrown Things =

EP by Movements
- Released: March 11, 2016
- Genres: Post-hardcore; emo; spoken word; alternative rock
- Length: 19:53
- Label: Fearless Records
- Producer: Will Yip

Movements chronology
Outgrown Things (2016)	Feel Something (2017)

Singles from Feel Something
- 1. "Kept" Released: January 14, 2016; 2. "Nineteen" Released: February 12, 2016

Outgrown Things is the debut extended play by Movements. The album reached 42 on the Indie charts.

== Background ==
After forming in January 2015, Movements self-released their first single, "Protection" on January 31, 2015. The band played their first show opening for Have Mercy in March 2015. A second single, "Buried" was released on March 17. A third single, "Scripted" was released on April 14. After only one local gig, the band signed a three-record deal with Fearless Records in August 2015.

Before recording their first EP, guitarist Brett Chiodo left the band in January 2016. Chiodo wrote the EP with the band, but did not participate in the recording. He was replaced by guitarist Ira George.

The band chose producer Will Yip to work on their debut EP. Outgrown Things was released on March 11, 2016. The EP was preceded by two singles, "Kept" and "Nineteen".

== Reception ==
Professional ratings
Review scores
Source	Rating
Cryptic Rock	5/5 stars
SoundFiction	9.7/10
Decaf Magazine	4.5/5 stars
idobi	8/10
Loud and Heavy	9/10

Outgrown Things received positive reviews. AltPress called it one of the 12 best EPs of 2016.

== Track listing ==
All tracks are written by Austin Cressey, Brett Chiodo, Patrick Miranda & William York.

No.	Title	Length
1.	"Kept" (Additional writing by Will Yip)	2:28
2.	"Nineteen"	4:01
3.	"Worst Wishes" (Additional writing by Will Yip)	3:07
4.	"Hatchet" (Additional writing by Will Yip)	2:44
5.	"Vacant Home" (Additional writing by Will Yip)	3:38
6.	"Losing Fight"	3:58
Total length:		19:53

== Personnel ==
- Patrick Miranda - Lead vocals
- Ira George - lead guitar
- Austin Cressey - bass guitar and rhythm guitar
- Spencer York - drums, percussion

== Charts ==
Chart (2018)	Peak position
US Independent Albums (Billboard)	42
US Heatseekers Albums (Billboard)	11
