= Feel Something (Movements album) =

Studio album by Movements
- Released: October 20, 2017
- Genre: Post-hardcore; emo; indie rock
- Length: 43:28
- Label: Fearless Records
- Producer: Will Yip

Movements chronology
Outgrown Things (2016)	Feel Something (2017)	No Good Left to Give (2020)

Singles from Feel Something
- 1. "Colorblind" Released: September 28, 2017; 2. "Deadly Dull" Released: March 9, 2018

Feel Something is the debut studio album by Movements. It peaked at 21 on the US Alternative Albums chart and 191 on the Billboard 200.

== Reception ==
Professional ratings
Review scores
Source	Rating
Alternative Press	4/5 stars
SoundFiction	8.9/10
Kill Your Stereo	92/100
KRUI-FM	8/10
Depthmag	9/10
Already Heard	3.5/5 stars
New Noise magazine	4.5/5 stars

Feel Something received critical acclaim. Depth Mag named the album one of the stand out albums of 2017.

== Commercial performance ==
The album made #2 on the Billboard's Top New Artist Albums Chart and peaked at #190 on the Billboard 200.

== Track listing ==
All tracks are written by Austin Cressey, Ira George, Patrick Miranda, Will Yip and William York.

No.	Title	Length
1.	"Full Circle"	3:25
2.	"Third Degree"	3:46
3.	"Colorblind"	3:40
4.	"Daylily"	3:29
5.	"Deadly Dull"	3:48
6.	"Fever Dream"	3:54
7.	"Suffer Through" (additional writing by Kyle Black)	4:45
8.	"Deep Red"	5:25
9.	"Under the Gun"	3:25
10.	"Submerge" (additional writing by Colin Holbrook and Curtis Peoples)	4:02
11.	"The Grey"	3:49
Total length:		43:28

== Personnel ==
- Patrick Miranda - lead vocals
- Ira George - lead guitar
- Austin Cressey - bass guitar and rhythm guitar
- Spencer York - drums, percussion

== Charts ==
Chart (2018)	Peak position
US Billboard 200	191
US Top Album Sales (Billboard)	50
US Top Alternative Albums (Billboard)	21
US Top Rock Albums (Billboard)	34
US Vinyl Albums (Billboard)	17
US Heatseekers Albums (Billboard)	2
