= Myron (song) =

2020 song by Lil Uzi Vert

Song by Lil Uzi Vert

from the album Lil Uzi Vert vs. the World 2
- Released: March 13, 2020
- Recorded: April 14, 2018
- Genre: Hip hop; trap
- Length: 3:45
- Label: Atlantic
- Songwriters: Symere Woods; Jordan Ortiz; Jonathan Priester
- Producers: Oogie Mane; Supah Mario

"Myron" is a song by American rapper Lil Uzi Vert. It was released as the first track off of their album Lil Uzi Vert vs. The World 2. The track peaked at number 13 on the Billboard Hot 100.

== Background ==
The track was teased as a snippet back in 2018. On May 14, 2020, the producers of the track, Supah Mario and Oogie Mane, broke down the beat for music company Genius.

== Critical reception ==
The track received critical acclaim. Mehan Jayasuriya of Pitchfork said the track had "exhilarating acrobatic flows". Alexander Cole of HotNewHipHop said that the track "will surely have fans spamming the replay button", and said the song sounds like "a victory lap that serves as the soundtrack to Uzi's triumphant return in 2020". Heran Mamo of Billboard called the track a "standout" on the album. Tyler Gaw of The Eastern Echo said the track "will go down as a legendary Uzi track".

== Commercial performance ==
The track reached number two on the Spotify Charts following its release. The track debuted at number 13 on the Billboard Hot 100, making it the highest-charting track from the album. The track also debuted at number two on the Rolling Stone Top 100.

== Charts ==
Chart (2020)	Peak position
Australia (ARIA)	89
Canada (Canadian Hot 100)	39
Iceland (Tónlistinn)	37
New Zealand Hot Singles (RMNZ)	2
Portugal (AFP)	183
UK Singles (Official Charts Company)	58
US Billboard Hot 100	13
US Hot R&B/Hip-Hop Songs (Billboard)	7
US Rolling Stone Top 100	2

== Certifications ==
Region	Certification	Certified units/sales
New Zealand (RMNZ)	Gold	15,000^{‡}
United Kingdom (BPI)	Silver	200,000^{‡}
United States (RIAA)	2× Platinum	2,000,000^{‡}
^{‡} Sales+streaming figures based on certification alone.
