= No Good Left to Give =

Studio album by Movements
- Released: September 18, 2020
- Genre: Alternative rock; emo; post-hardcore
- Length: 43:57
- Label: Fearless
- Producer: Will Yip

Movements chronology
Feel Something (2017)	No Good Left to Give (2020)	RUCKUS! (2023)

Singles from No Good Left to Give
- 1. "Don't Give Up Your Ghost" Released: July 24, 2020; 2. "Skin to Skin" Released: August 21, 2020; 3. "Tunnel Vision" Released: September 11, 2020

Professional ratings
Review scores
Source	Rating
AllMusic	3.5/5 stars
Depth	9/10
Kerrang!	4/5
KillYourStereo	80/100
New Noise Magazine	5/5 stars
Wall of Sound	10/10

No Good Left to Give is the second studio album by Movements.

== Track listing ==
All tracks are written by Movements and Will Yip.

No Good Left to Give track listing
No.	Title	Length
1.	"In My Blood"	3:33
2.	"Skin to Skin"	4:01
3.	"Don't Give Up Your Ghost"	3:57
4.	"Tunnel Vision"	4:01
5.	"Garden Eyes" (Additional writing by Andrew Goldstein)	3:24
6.	"12 Weeks"	3:42
7.	"Living Apology" (Additional writing by Zach Tuch and Jesse D. Barnett)	4:07
8.	"Santiago Peak"	4:13
9.	"Seneca"	3:10
10.	"Moonlight Lines"	3:37
11.	"No Good Left to Give"	1:35
12.	"Love Took the Last of It"	4:37
Total length:		43:57

== Personnel ==
Movements

- Patrick Miranda – lead vocals
- Ira George – lead guitar
- Austin Cressey – bass guitar and rhythm guitar
- Spencer York – drums, percussion

Additional musicians and production

- Will Yip – additional percussion and keyboards; producer, engineering, and mixing
- Hank Byerly – assistant engineer
- Jeff Thomas – piano on "Don't Give Up Your Ghost" and "No Good Left to Give"

== Charts ==
No Good Left to Give chart performance
Chart (2020)	Peak position
US Billboard 200	171
US Independent Albums (Billboard)	34
US Top Alternative Albums (Billboard)	9
US Top Rock Albums (Billboard)	26
