= Bugz Ronin =

American record producer

- Born: Daniel Luis Perez; August 7, 1993 (age 32); Stroudsburg, Pennsylvania, U.S.
- Genres: Hip-hop
- Occupations: Record producer; songwriter
- Instrument: FL Studio
- Years active: 2016–present
- Publishers: Sony Music Publishing

Daniel Luis Perez (born August 7, 1993), professionally known as Bugz Ronin, is an American record producer and songwriter. He is best known for producing on Yung Bans' debut studio album Misunderstood (2019) and Lil Uzi Vert's second studio album Eternal Atake (2020), as well as producing for numerous other notable artists including Yeat and TyFontaine. He initially rose to prominence by producing a slew of tracks for Lil Uzi Vert. He is currently signed to Sony Music Publishing in a publishing deal.

== Early life ==
Daniel Luis Perez was born on August 7, 1993, in Stroudsburg, Pennsylvania, where he also grew up and learned how to produce beats.

== Career ==
Ronin had been producing for several years before he met the manager of American rapper Lil Uzi Vert in 2016. He began sending music to his team over the next couple years. Many of these tracks were either released on SoundCloud or leaked. In 2019, Ronin would produce three tracks on Yung Bans debut studio album Misunderstood. In 2020, Bugz's production would later be heavily featured on Lil Uzi Vert second studio album Eternal Atake.

Eternal Atake was a commercial success, debuting atop the US Billboard 200 with 288,000 album-equivalent units (including 9,000 pure album sales). The album earned more than 400 million US streams in its first week. This was Lil Uzi Vert's second US number-one album and remained number one on the Billboard 200 in its second week with 247,000 album-equivalent units. In that same week, Ronin signed with Sony/ATV Music Publishing.

== Discography ==
Credits derived from AllMusic and Genius

Year	Title	Artist
2019	"Broken Pieces"	Yung Bans
2019	"Too Many Times"	Yung Bans
2019	"Goin Wild"	Yung Bans
2020	"Baby Pluto"	Lil Uzi Vert
2020	"Lo Mein"	Lil Uzi Vert
2020	"Homecoming"	Lil Uzi Vert
2020	"Bust Me"	Lil Uzi Vert
2020	"Secure The Bag"	Lil Uzi Vert
2020	"Off The Lot"	TyFontaine
2021	"Morning Mudd"	Yeat
2022	"Way back"	Yeat
2022	"3G"	Yeat
2022	"Luv monëy"	Yeat
2022	Nëw turban"	Yeat
2022	"Droughtski"	Lucki
2023	"Bëttr Off"	Yeat
2023	"Amped"	Lil Uzi Vert
2023	"Endless Fashion" (featuring Nicki Minaj)	Lil Uzi Vert
2023	"Mama, I'm Sorry"	Lil Uzi Vert
2023	"Patience" (featuring Don Toliver)	Lil Uzi Vert
2023	"Shardai"	Lil Uzi Vert
