= Bean (Kobe) =

2020 song by Lil Uzi Vert featuring Chief Keef

Song by Lil Uzi Vert featuring Chief Keef

from the album Lil Uzi Vert vs. the World 2
- Released: March 13, 2020
- Recorded: September 19, 2017
- Genre: Trap; Hip hop
- Length: 3:58
- Label: Atlantic
- Songwriters: Symere Woods; Keith Cozart; Jordan Jenks
- Producer: Pi'erre Bourne

"Bean (Kobe)" is a song by American rapper Lil Uzi Vert featuring fellow American rapper Chief Keef. Produced by Pi'erre Bourne, it was released on March 13, 2020, as the third track off of the deluxe edition of Uzi's album Eternal Atake, titled Lil Uzi Vert vs. The World 2. The track peaked at number 19 on the Billboard Hot 100.

== Background ==
Snippets of the track leaked in 2017 under the name "Kobe Rollie". Lil Uzi Vert and Chief Keef performed the song live in December 2018.

== Music video ==
The lyric video for the track was released on April 21, 2020.

== Critical reception ==
Mehan Jayasuriya of Pitchfork called the track a "crown jewel" on the album, and said that the "woozy song zeroes in on the sweet spot between Keef's hard-charging flows and Uzi's impressionistic yelps". Andre Gee of Uproxx called the track a "highlight" on the album, and said that Chief Keef contributed "a surprisingly lucid verse that steadily picks up steam line-by-line".

== Commercial performance ==
The track debuted and peaked at number 19 on the Billboard Hot 100. The track was Chief Keef's first Hot 100 entry since his 2012 single "Love Sosa". It is also currently his highest-charting song.

== Charts ==
Chart (2020)	Peak position
Canada (Canadian Hot 100)	60
New Zealand Hot Singles (RMNZ)	9
US Billboard Hot 100	19
US Hot R&B/Hip-Hop Songs (Billboard)	10
