= Love Is the King =

Studio album by Jeff Tweedy
- Released: October 23, 2020
- Recorded: April 2020
- Studios: The Loft (Chicago, IL)
- Genre: Indie rock
- Length: 39:28
- Label: dBpm
- Producers: Jeff Tweedy; Tom Schick

Jeff Tweedy chronology
WARMER (2019)	Love Is the King (2020)	Twilight Override (2025)

Love Is the King is the fourth solo studio album by American musician Jeff Tweedy. It was released on October 23, 2020, via dBpm Records. Recording sessions took place at the Loft in Chicago during lockdown in April 2020 after Wilco's tour dates were cancelled due to COVID-19. Production was handled by Tom Schick and Tweedy himself. It features contributions from his sons Spencer and Sam.

== Critical reception ==
Professional ratings
Aggregate scores
Source	Rating
AnyDecentMusic?	7.4/10
Metacritic	81/100
Review scores
Source	Rating
AllMusic	4/5 stars
Beats Per Minute	71%
Consequence of Sound	B
Exclaim!	8/10
Loud and Quiet	7/10
Mojo	4/5 stars
Paste	8.1/10
Pitchfork	7.3/10
Uncut	8/10
Under the Radar	7.5/10 stars

Love Is the King was met with universal acclaim from music critics. At Metacritic, which assigns a normalized rating out of 100 to reviews from mainstream publications, the album received an average score of 81 based on ten reviews. The aggregator AnyDecentMusic? has the critical consensus of the album at a 7.4 out of 10, based on eleven reviews.

Eric R. Danton of Paste wrote: "Like Warm and Warmer, Tweedy's requires a bit of patience to crack open. The songs tend to seep in slowly, but it's worth the effort to burrow into them: Beneath that low-key exterior, Love Is the King displays luminous depth from a veteran songwriter who continues to grow into his craft". AllMusic's Mark Deming wrote: "Love Is the King is his very personal reaction to an increasingly difficult time in America's history, and while he doesn't pretend to have answers, this music is his own kind of therapy, recognizing his emotions and working through them before they devour him, and he makes both the process and the challenges well worth hearing". Vish Khanna of Exclaim! felt "the vibe is folk, rock, country and kind of homespun and laidback but, like early John Lennon records, there is sharpness to the starkness". Victoria Segal of Mojo wrote: "From the beautiful fable of "A Robin Or A Wren" to "Even I Can See"'s delicate devotion, Love Is The King is determined to hold on tight to the good things while keeping a sharp eye on the mirror". Alastair McKay of Uncut found that "this album marries Tweedy's mature emotional outlook to the workaday manners of Uncle Tupelo or the Woody Guthrie project, Mermaid Avenue". Ryan Bray of Consequence of Sound stated: "Love Is the King is the work of a songwriter with clear eyes and a full heart. Tweedy leans on the two constants in his life, music and family, to find hope in a year where such a thing has too often been absent. In doing so, he's left behind more than just another solid record to add to his oeuvre, but also some reassurance that maybe things will be okay, so long as we keep sight of what's important". Mark Moody of Under the Radar wrote: "Though recorded under lockdown, the songs may be maudlin in spots but don’t directly address the situation at hand. Primarily Love Is the King has the air of what it in fact is: a man comfortable in his own skin recording a set of songs with his talented kids". Writing for Pitchfork, Stephen Thomas Erlewine said: "The reason the record provides some measure of consolation is due to its modesty. Rather than a concept album about quarantine, it's a snapshot of a moment in time, one that captures the confusion, longing, and loneliness of a world set back on its heels". John Wohlmacher of Beats Per Minute wrote: "for 11 songs and 39 minutes, Tweedy creates a landscape of autumnal beauty and warm layers of guitars, which oscillate between experimental, almost distorted ambience and clear, saccharine folk melodies. There's a few straight country tracks here, but for the most part, it's minimalist genre-revisionism". Janne Oinonen of Loud and Quiet wrote: "A record to mature over time rather than instant classic, Love Is The King might just prove an equally reassuring presence as the world stumbles towards some sort of elusive normality during these uncertain times".

== Track listing ==
All tracks are written by Jeff Tweedy, except for track 3 written with George Saunders.

No.	Title	Length
1.	"Love Is the King"	4:46
2.	"Opaline"	4:44
3.	"A Robin or a Wren"	2:48
4.	"Gwendolyn"	3:26
5.	"Bad Day Lately"	3:10
6.	"Even I Can See"	3:20
7.	"Natural Disaster"	3:23
8.	"Save It for Me"	3:03
9.	"Guess Again"	3:16
10.	"Troubled"	3:12
11.	"Half-Asleep"	4:20
Total length:		39:28

== Personnel ==
- Jeff Tweedy – vocals, acoustic guitar, electric guitar (tracks: 1–7, 9–11), bass guitar (tracks: 1–5, 7–11), whistling (track 8), producer, design
- Spencer Tweedy – drums (tracks: 1–5, 7–11), organ (track 2), percussion (track 4), harmony vocals (track 7), tambourine (track 9), design
- Sammy Tweedy – harmony vocals (tracks: 3, 7–9, 11)
- Tom Schick – producer, engineering
- Mark Greenberg – assistant engineering
- Bob Ludwig – mastering
- Sheila Sachs – design
- Robert Capa – photography

== Charts ==
Chart performance for Love Is the King
Chart (2020–2021)	Peak position
Belgian Albums (Ultratop Flanders)	78
German Albums (Offizielle Top 100)	48
Scottish Albums (Official Charts)	27
UK Americana Albums (Official Charts)	16
US Billboard 200	89
US Top Rock Albums (Billboard)	11
