= The New OK =

Studio album by Drive-By Truckers
- Released: October 2, 2020
- Length: 36:15
- Label: ATO
- Producer: David Barbe

Drive-By Truckers chronology
The Unraveling (2020)	The New OK (2020)	Welcome 2 Club XIII (2022)

The New OK is the thirteenth studio album by American southern rock band Drive-By Truckers, released digitally on October 2, 2020 and physically on December 18, 2020 on ATO Records. It consists of outtakes from their previous album The Unraveling, songs dating as far back as 2011, and songs Patterson Hood recorded over the summer of 2020 in response to the Black Lives Matter protests in Portland, Oregon and COVID-19 pandemic. It peaked at number 14 on the Billboard's top Americana/Folk Albums chart the week of January 1, 2021.

== Background ==
In the album's liner notes, songwriter Patterson Hood explained the inspiration for the title track and album, writing: "concerned people that I love frequently ask me how I'm doing. I would respond that 'I'm OK... The New OK'." The songs "The Unraveling", "The Perilous Night", and "Sarah's Flame" were written between 2017 and 2019 for their previous album The Unraveling, while "The Distance" dates back to 2011 and was originally intended to be included on their English Oceans album. Regarding the songs written during the tumultuous summer of 2020, Hood elaborates that "I wrote 'Watching the Orange Clouds' the weekend after George Floyd's murder as I watched the whole country rise up in a chaotic firestorm of anger and calls for a righteous change. I wrote 'The New OK' a couple of months later during the heat of the federal occupation in my adopted hometown of Portland, Oregon."

== Reception ==
Professional ratings
Aggregate scores
Source	Rating
Metacritic	80/100
Review scores
Source	Rating
AllMusic	4/5 stars
American Songwriter	4.5/5 stars
And It Don't Stop	(3-star Honorable Mention)
The Guardian	4/5 stars
Pitchfork	7.3/10

The New OK was met with generally positive reviews. At Metacritic, which assigns a normalized rating out of 100 to reviews from professional critics, the album holds an average score of 80, based on 10 reviews. In a four-star review The Guardian noted that the album feels like a "companion record" to The Unraveling and that "at a time of such division, it's a startlingly brave record and all the more necessary for it". In a generally positive review, Pitchfork commented that "The New OK is a chance to show off more sides of themselves, from the R&B horns of those Memphis sessions to the old-school punk of their Ramones cover to the more post-punk sound of Hood's newly penned songs". Regarding the album's themes and lyrical content, the review concluded that "rather than bemoan the new normal we've all been forced to accept, the Truckers celebrate our adaptability and our fortitude, subtly promising there will be better days and more rock shows ahead." Robert Christgau was less enthusiastic, highlighting the songs "The KKK Took My Baby Away", "Sarah's Flame", and "The Perilous Night" while concluding that it is "not a good sign if also no disgrace when the standout tune on the conscious album no one blames them for needing to make began its life with the Ramones".

== Track listing ==
No.	Title	Writer(s)	Length
1.	"The New OK"	Hood	4:25
2.	"Tough to Let Go"	Hood	4:49
3.	"The Unraveling"	Hood/Patton	2:44
4.	"The Perilous Night"	Hood	4:37
5.	"Sarah's Flame"	Cooley	3:32
6.	"Sea Island Lonely"	Hood	4:20
7.	"The Distance"	Hood	4:06
8.	"Watching the Orange Clouds"	Hood	5:15
9.	"The KKK Took My Baby Away"	Joey Ramone, Dee Dee Ramone and Johnny Ramone	2:31
Total length:			36:15

== Personnel ==
- Patterson Hood – vocals, guitar, mandocello
- Mike Cooley – vocals, guitar
- Brad Morgan – drums
- Jay Gonzalez – keyboards, guitars and vocals
- Matt Patton – bass, bass 6 and vocals
- Marc Franklin – trumpet on "Sea Island Lonely" and "Tough to Let Go"
- Kirk Smothers – baritone sax on "Sea Island Lonely" and "Tough to Let Go"
- Victor Sawyer – trombone on "Sea Island Lonely" and "Tough to Let Go"
- Lannie McMillan – tenor sax on "Sea Island Lonely" and "Tough to Let Go"
- Tangela Longstreet – backing vocals on "The Perilous Night"
- Joyce Jones – backing vocals on "The Perilous Night"
- Tawana Cunningham – backing vocals on "The Perilous Night"

== Charts ==
Chart performance for The New OK
Chart (2021)	Peak position
Scottish Albums (OCC)	69
