= Movements (band) =

American post-hardcore band

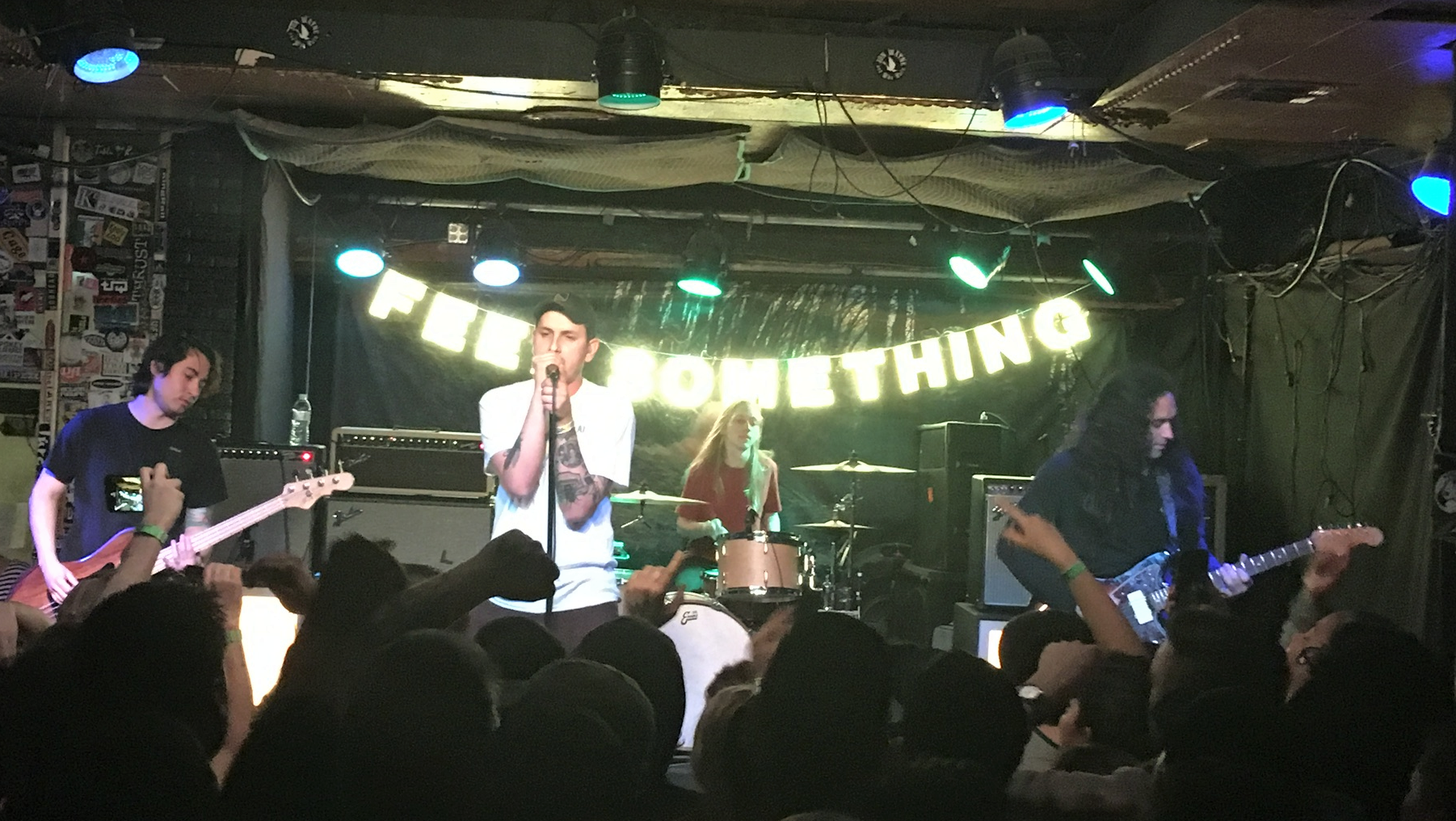
- Movements in 2018. From left to right: Austin Cressey, Patrick Miranda, Spencer York, Ira George

Background information
- Origin: Rancho Santa Margarita, California
- Genres: Emo; post-hardcore; soft grunge; alternative rock; spoken word
- Years active: 2015–present
- Label: Fearless
- Members: Patrick Miranda; Ira George; Spencer York; Austin Cressey
- Past members: Brett Chiodo
- Website: movementsofficial.com

Movements are an American post-hardcore band from Rancho Santa Margarita, California, formed in 2015.

The band was signed to a record contract with Fearless Records after playing just one show in 2015. They have released an EP, Outgrown Things (2016), and four albums, Feel Something (2017), No Good Left to Give (2020), RUCKUS! (2023), and Happier Now (2026). Feel Something peaked at 190 on the Billboard 200 chart.

== History ==
Movements was formed in January 2015 by guitarist Brett Chiodo and Patrick Miranda and soon recruited drummer Spencer York, and bassist Austin Cressey.

They self-released their first single, "Protection" on January 31, 2015 and played their first show opening for Have Mercy in March 2015. A second single, "Buried" was released on March 17. A third single, "Scripted" was released on April 14. After only one local gig, the band signed a three-record deal with Fearless Records in August 2015.

After recording their first EP, Outgrown Things, Chiodo and the band parted ways in January 2016. He was replaced by Ira George.

Their debut EP, produced by Will Yip, Outgrown Things was released on March 11, 2016. The album reached 42 on the Indie charts. That month, the band toured with Real Friends on a tour where tickets were only $5 and the bands played in unconventional places such as bowling alleys and skateparks.

In April 2017, they were nominated for "Best Underground Band" at the 2017 Alternative Press Music Awards.

The band played the entirety of the 2017 Warped Tour. During one set of the tour, vocalist Patrick Miranda helped fill-in for Counterparts vocalist Brendan Murphy who had to miss the show due to a family emergency.

Over the course of the tours, the band spent over a year and a half writing new music for their upcoming debut album. On September 28, 2017, the band released the music video for their first single of their debut album. "Colorblind" features a music video in which the band's lyrics are projected onto the sides of houses and buildings. The album, Feel Something, was also produced by Will Yip, and released on October 20, 2017. The album made reached number two on the Billboard's Top New Artist Albums Chart and peaked at number 190 on the Billboard 200. The band themselves peaked at number 23 on the Emerging Artists chart.

In November 2017, they were scheduled to tour Europe with Knuckle Puck, Tiny Moving Parts and Have Mercy. However, Knuckle Puck canceled the tour. In 2018 they embarked on a headlining tour with Can't Swim, Super Whatevr and Gleemer. Afterwards, they went on a UK tour with Muskets and Paerish. The band performed at Emo Nite Day hosted by Emo Nite in Los Angeles in December 2017.

In March 2018, the band released a music video for the song "Deadly Dull". The band teamed up with Alzheimer's Association for the video to spread awareness. In November 2018, they released a cover of R.E.M.'s "Losing My Religion" as part of Songs that Saved My Life compilation released on Hopeless Records.

On July 24, 2020, the band released a new single "Don't Give Up Your Ghost" with a music video, along with the announcement of their second album entitled No Good Left to Give, to be released on September 18, 2020, via Fearless Records. On August 21, the band released a second single "Skin to Skin" along with its music video. On September 11, 2020 "Tunnel Vision", the third and final single for the album was released. The effort was once again produced by long-time collaborator Will Yip. On August 20, 2021, the band released two b-sides from the album, titled "Panic" and "No Silhouette".

On March 11, 2022, the band released a new single "Barbed Wire Body". On August 19, 2022, another single "Cherry Thrill" was released, with the music video for it following on August 26.

On April 28, 2023, the band released two new singles, "Killing Time" and "Lead Pipe", along with music videos for both songs. On June 15, the band released a fourth single "Tightrope" from the album, along with a music video. On July 13, the fifth and final single "Heaven Sent" was released, along with a music video. The band confirmed with Valentino Petrarca from The Aquarian that they would begin writing their 4th studio album at the end of 2025.

== Musical style, lyrics and influence ==
The band's music is a mixture of post-hardcore, soft grunge, alternative rock, and spoken word. They are considered part of the emo revival movement.

Vocalist Patrick Miranda has been diagnosed with obsessive–compulsive disorder and has struggled with depression and anxiety, struggles that heavily influence the band's lyrics. Other lyrical themes include heartbreak and tense relationships with parents. The song "Deadly Dull" is written about Alzheimer's disease, which Miranda's grandmother suffered from.

Movements' influences include such bands as Balance and Composure, Citizen, Pianos Become the Teeth, La Dispute, Oceana, Title Fight and Thrice.

== Band members ==
=== Current ===
- Patrick Miranda – vocals (2015–present)
- Austin Cressey – bass guitar, rhythm guitar (2015–present)
- Spencer York – drums (2015–present)
- Ira George – lead guitar (2016–present)
- Crust Young – guitar (touring)

=== Former ===
- Brett Chiodo – lead guitar (2015–2016)

== Discography ==
=== Studio albums ===
Title	Details	Peak chart positions				
Title	Details	US	US Heat.	US Alt.	US Rock	US Vinyl
Feel Something	Released: October 20, 2017; Label: Fearless	190	2	21	34	17
No Good Left to Give	Released: September 18, 2020; Label: Fearless	171	2	9	26	5
RUCKUS!	Released: August 18, 2023; Label: Fearless	171	2	9	26	5
Happier Now	Released: September 4, 2026; Label: Fearless	-	-	-	-	-

=== Extended plays ===
Title	Details	Peak chart positions	
Title	Details	US Heat.	US Indie
Outgrown Things	Released: March 11, 2016; Label: Fearless	11	42

=== Singles ===
- "Protection" (2015)
- "Buried" (2015)
- "Scripted" (2015)
- "Kept" (2016)
- "Nineteen" (2016)
- "Hatchet (Catacomb Sessions) (2016)
- "Colorblind" (2017)
- "Deadly Dull" (2018)
- "Losing My Religion" (2018)
- "Don't Give Up Your Ghost" (2020)
- "Skin to Skin" (2020)
- "Tunnel Vision" (2020)
- "Barbed Wire Body" (2022)
- "Cherry Thrill" (2022)
- "Killing Time" (2023)
- "Lead Pipe" (2023)
- "Fail You" (2023)
- "Tightrope" (2023)
- "Heaven Sent" (2023)
- "Afraid To Die" (2024)
- "Where I Lay" (2025)
- "Back in My Ways" (2026)
- "Dissolve Me" (2026)

== Awards and nominations ==
Year	Award	Category	Nominee	Result
2017	Alternative Press Music Awards	Best Underground Band	Movements	Nominated
