= Baby Pluto =

Song by Lil Uzi Vert

from the album Eternal Atake
- Released: March 6, 2020
- Recorded: 2019
- Genre: Hip hop; trap
- Length: 3:30
- Label: Atlantic
- Songwriters: Symere Woods; Brandon Veal; Daniel Perez; Vincent DeLon; Ivison Smith
- Producers: Brandon Finessin; Bugz Ronin; Cousin Vinny; Ike Beatz

"Baby Pluto" is a song by American rapper Lil Uzi Vert. It was released on March 6, 2020, as the first track on their second studio album Eternal Atake. The track peaked at number six on the Billboard Hot 100.

== Music video ==
An official lyric video was released on May 2, 2020. The entire video is in claymation, which was made and directed by artist Zac Matias, also known online as Lonewolf.

== Critical reception ==
The track received generally positive reviews. Kyann-Sian Williams of NME called the instrumental of the track "clashing". Will Schube of Complex called the lines on the track "stellar". Dylan Green of DJBooth said the track sounded like "a chandelier covered in baguettes gleaming from the inside of a UFO".

== Commercial performance ==
The track debuted at number six on the Billboard Hot 100, making it the second highest-charting track (behind "Futsal Shuffle 2020" at number five).

== Charts ==
Chart performance for "Baby Pluto"
Chart (2020)	Peak position
Australia (ARIA)	48
Australia Hip Hop/R&B (ARIA)	15
Canada (Canadian Hot 100)	13
Iceland (Tónlistinn)	24
Ireland (IRMA)	34
Netherlands (Single Top 100)	77
New Zealand Hot Singles (RMNZ)	3
Portugal (AFP)	68
Sweden Heatseeker (Sverigetopplistan)	1
Switzerland (Schweizer Hitparade)	48
UK Singles (OCC)	36
UK Hip Hop/R&B (OCC)	17
US Billboard Hot 100	6
US Hot R&B/Hip-Hop Songs (Billboard)	4
US Rolling Stone Top 100	1

== Certifications ==
Certifications for "Baby Pluto"
Region	Certification	Certified units/sales
Canada (Music Canada)	Platinum	80,000^{‡}
United States (RIAA)	Platinum	1,000,000^{‡}
^{‡} Sales+streaming figures based on certification alone.
