= P2 (song) =

2020 song by Lil Uzi Vert

Song by Lil Uzi Vert

from the album Eternal Atake
- Released: March 6, 2020
- Genre: Emo rap
- Length: 3:54
- Label: Atlantic
- Songwriters: Symere Woods; Bryan Simmons
- Producer: TM88

"P2" is a song by American rapper Lil Uzi Vert. It was released on March 6, 2020, as the 16th track on their album Eternal Atake. It is a sequel to "XO Tour Llif3". The track peaked at number 11 on the Billboard Hot 100.

== Background and composition ==
The track is a sequel to the 2017 single "XO Tour Llif3", which peaked at number seven on the Billboard Hot 100. Uzi teased the track on February 5, 2020, when replying to a fan on Twitter. The track was produced by TM88, who also produced "XO Tour Llif3". The track features the same melody as the original track.

== Reception ==
Michael Saponara of Billboard ranked the track the fourth best from the album, giving props to Uzi "for facing the daunting task of measuring up against his biggest smash to date". Mitch Findlay of HotNewHipHop said that the track "impresses in its ability to honor its predecessor while still sounding like a fresh take", and added that in some ways, the track "even feels like an improvement on the original".

The track debuted at number 11 on the Billboard Hot 100, making it the fifth highest-charting song from the album.

== Charts ==
Chart performance for "P2"
Chart (2020)	Peak position
Australia (ARIA)	52
Australia Hip Hop/R&B (ARIA)	15
Canada Hot 100 (Billboard)	20
Iceland (Tónlistinn)	31
Ireland (IRMA)	33
Netherlands (Single Top 100)	80
New Zealand (Recorded Music NZ)	34
Portugal (AFP)	83
Sweden Heatseeker (Sverigetopplistan)	17
Switzerland (Schweizer Hitparade)	63
UK Singles (OCC)	37
UK Hip Hop/R&B (OCC)	18
US Billboard Hot 100	11
US Hot R&B/Hip-Hop Songs (Billboard)	9
US Rolling Stone Top 100	5

== Certifications ==
Certifications for "P2"
Region	Certification	Certified units/sales
Canada (Music Canada)	2× Platinum	160,000^{‡}
New Zealand (RMNZ)	Gold	15,000^{‡}
United States (RIAA)	2× Platinum	2,000,000^{‡}
^{‡} Sales+streaming figures based on certification alone.
