= That Way (Lil Uzi Vert song) =

2020 single by Lil Uzi Vert

Single by Lil Uzi Vert

from the album Eternal Atake
- Released: March 1, 2020
- Genre: Emo rap; trap; pop-rap
- Length: 3:32
- Label: Generation Now; Atlantic
- Songwriters: Symere Woods; Jonathan Priester; Andres Espana; Milan Modi; Andreas Carlsson; Max Martin
- Producers: Supah Mario; Felipe S; Yung Lan

Lil Uzi Vert singles chronology
"Futsal Shuffle 2020" (2019)	"That Way" (2020)	"Sasuke" (2020)

"That Way" is a song by American rapper Lil Uzi Vert. It was released on March 1, 2020, by Generation Now and Atlantic Records as the second single from their second studio album Eternal Atake. The song prominently interpolates the hook of the Backstreet Boys' "I Want It That Way" (1999).

== Cover artwork ==
The cover art has been subject to allegations of plagiarism. On March 14, 2020, an online artist under the alias of 'hugeriver8' on Instagram claimed that the cover art plagiarizes a nearly identical piece they posted on their blog in 2014. The human figure on the cover art has also been claimed to be copied from a different artist under the alias of 'la_la_la_fries', for a piece of fanart of the guitarist Pete Townshend of The Who, which was first posted on Instagram in late November 2015.

When prompted, the artist of the That Way album cover responded that he simply designed what Lil Uzi Vert had asked him to design, and that the picture he is alleged to have plagiarized was sent as reference work. Following this, Lil Uzi Vert left a comment saying, "Hey I'm not a mean person or a thief I get inspired a lot. If you want Money I will have my team contact and give you Money. Signed… Baby Pluto. P.S. You are a great artist."

== Critical reception ==
Alphonse Pierre of Pitchfork viewed the song as the rapper's "return to the shoulder shimmying, eye-rolling, singing Hayley Williams in the backseat of a car Uzi, whose animated personality made [their] meteoric fall possible". In context of the album, Charles Homes and Elias Leight at Rolling Stone described the composition of the song as "a jarringly saccharine plagiarism of the Backstreet Boys' 1999 hit "I Want It That Way"" in connection "with a jittery, steamrolling track ripped off from the music from Microsoft Windows' videogame Space Cadet 3D Pinball". As for Uzi's performance on the song, Carl Lamarre concluded that they are in their "element, spraying lighthearted bars over the breezy track" and called the song an "abomination".

== Backstreet Boys response ==
Backstreet Boys member Nick Carter praised the song on his Twitter and told Uzi that he wants them to be "featured on our next album".

== Charts ==
=== Weekly charts ===
Weekly chart performance for "That Way"
Chart (2020)	Peak position
Australia (ARIA)	53
Australia Hip Hop/R&B (ARIA)	17
Belgium (Ultratip Bubbling Under Flanders)	28
Belgium (Ultratip Bubbling Under Wallonia)	40
Canada Hot 100 (Billboard)	27
Hungary (Stream Top 40)	33
Ireland (IRMA)	41
Netherlands (Single Top 100)	95
New Zealand (Recorded Music NZ)	38
Portugal (AFP)	70
Slovakia Singles Digital (ČNS IFPI)	58
Sweden Heatseeker (Sverigetopplistan)	11
Switzerland (Schweizer Hitparade)	66
UK Singles (OCC)	47
UK Hip Hop/R&B (OCC)	28
US Billboard Hot 100	20
US Hot R&B/Hip-Hop Songs (Billboard)	11
US Rhythmic Airplay (Billboard)	15
US Rolling Stone Top 100	6

=== Year-end charts ===
Year-end chart performance for "That Way"
Chart (2020)	Position
US Hot R&B/Hip-Hop Songs (Billboard)	78

== Certifications ==
Certifications for "That Way"
Region	Certification	Certified units/sales
Canada (Music Canada)	Platinum	80,000^{‡}
New Zealand (RMNZ)	Gold	15,000^{‡}
United States (RIAA)	2× Platinum	2,000,000^{‡}
^{‡} Sales+streaming figures based on certification alone.
