= Eternal Atake =

Studio album by Lil Uzi Vert
- Released: March 6, 2020
- Recorded: 2018–2020
- Studios: Jungle City (New York City); Milkboy (Philadelphia); NRG (North Hollywood)
- Genre: Hip-hop
- Length: 62:13
- Labels: Generation Now; Atlantic
- Producers: Bobby Raps; Brandon Finessin; Bugz Ronin; Chief Keef; Cousin Vinny; Dez Wright Beats; Felipe S; Harold Harper; Ike Beatz; Loesoe; Mayyzo; Nick Seeley; Oogie Mane; Outtatown; Starboy; Supah Mario; TM88; Wheezy; Yung Lan

Lil Uzi Vert chronology
| Luv Is Rage 2 (2017) | Eternal Atake (2020) | Lil Uzi Vert vs. the World 2 (2020) |

Alternate cover
- Back cover

Singles from Eternal Atake
- 1. "Futsal Shuffle 2020" Released: December 13, 2019; 2. "That Way" Released: March 1, 2020

Eternal Atake is the second studio album by the American rapper and singer Lil Uzi Vert. It was released through Generation Now and Atlantic Records on March 6, 2020. The album features a sole guest appearance from American singer Syd. The production was handled by Bobby Raps, Brandon Finessin, Bugz Ronin, Chief Keef, Oogie Mane, TM88, Wheezy, and others. It is their first project since their debut studio album, Luv Is Rage 2 (2017). The album was supported by the singles "Futsal Shuffle 2020" and "That Way", which later appeared as the album's bonus tracks.

A week later, on March 13, the deluxe version of the album, titled Lil Uzi Vert vs. the World 2 was released as a surprise album. The album served as a sequel to their third mixtape, Lil Uzi Vert vs. the World (2016), which was released four years earlier. The album features new guest appearances from Chief Keef, 21 Savage, Future, Young Thug, Gunna, Lil Durk, Young Nudy, and Nav. Eternal Atake received widespread acclaim from critics, debuting at number one on the US Billboard 200, earning 288,000 album-equivalent units in its first week. The album earned 400 million US streams in its first week, which was the fourth-largest streaming debut at the time of its release.

== Background ==
In July 2018, Lil Uzi Vert published two messages to Twitter, "Eternal Atake" and "Eternal means forever. Atake means 2 overtake", that were described as cryptic. On July 31, 2018, which was also Lil Uzi's 24th birthday, they removed all posts from their Instagram profile except for two—a snippet of "New Patek" and the old cover art of Eternal Atake. On December 9, Lil Uzi confirmed that Eternal Atake had been finished and was set for release.

On January 11, 2019, Lil Uzi announced via Instagram that they had "deleted everything" and were "done with music", although many believed this could merely have been a publicity stunt and/or a promotional roll-out for the album. On March 3, 2020, Lil Uzi revealed a new album cover on Twitter, after allowing fans to vote on the new cover.

== Composition ==
Eternal Atake marks a significant evolution in Lil Uzi Vert's sound, building on the melodic trap and emo rap foundations of their earlier works, Luv Is Rage (2015) and Luv Is Rage 2 (2017), while venturing into a more ambitious, futuristic, and conceptually driven sonic landscape. Spanning 18 tracks over an hour, the album fuses pop-trap sensibilities with sci-fi-inspired production, characterized by glitchy synths, booming 808s, and video game-esque sound effects. AllMusic highlights its "meticulous production and amplified energy", crediting the Philly-based production collective Working on Dying, alongside producers like Brandon Finessin, Bugz Ronin, Oogie Mane, and Supah Mario, for crafting beats that evoke a space opera aesthetic. Tracks like "Homecoming" feature distorted percussion and synthesized horns, while "You Better Move" incorporates laser sound effects and samples from "Space Cadet 3D Pinball", creating a vivid, intergalactic atmosphere.

The album is loosely structured around a sci-fi narrative of alien abductions and space travel, reflected in skits and Uzi's alter egos—Baby Pluto, Renji, and Uzi themselves—though the concept is secondary to the music's vibe. Rolling Stone describes the album as divided into three six-song sides, each tied to a persona: Baby Pluto's aggressive flexes, Renji's vulnerable introspection, and Uzi's cosmic reflections. This structure allows for dynamic shifts in tone, from the frenetic braggadocio of "Pop" and "Lo Mein" to the melancholic "I'm Sorry" and "Chrome Heart Tags", the latter featuring a Chief Keef-produced beat with haunting vocal samples and Flockaveli-esque drums.

Uzi's vocal versatility is central to the album's appeal, seamlessly blending rapid-fire rapping, melodic crooning, and high-pitched ad-libs. Pitchfork praises Uzi's improved technical prowess, citing "Silly Watch" and "You Better Move" for their relentless pace and clever pop culture references, like Blue Eyes White Dragon and Microsoft Zune. Tracks like "Bigger Than Life" and "Celebration Station" showcase Uzi's ability to craft infectious hooks, with the former balancing a smooth yet frenzied refrain and the latter featuring playful lyricism ("And I can't do my dance 'cause my pants, they from France"). The Backstreet Boys interpolation on "That Way" transforms a pop classic into a trap banger, highlighting Uzi's knack for reimagining familiar sounds.

Lyrically, Uzi remains focused on familiar themes: wealth, designer brands, cars, women, and heartbreak, but with richer detail and sharper wit. Consequence highlights Uzi's humor, such as the quip about a Honda Accord on "Baby Pluto". Emotional depth surfaces in tracks like "I'm Sorry" and "Urgency" (featuring Syd), where Uzi grapples with fame and failed relationships, though Consequence highlights the deluxe edition Lil Uzi Vert vs. the World 2 for lacking similar candor. The album's only guest appearance, Syd on "Urgency", adds a soulful contrast to Uzi's chaotic energy.

While Eternal Atake maintains a high-energy pulse, its hour-long runtime and occasional repetitiveness draw minor criticism. AllMusic suggests it can "drag on" despite having no filler, and NME calls it a "rambling but enjoyable mess". Tracks like "P2", a rehash of "XO Tour Llif3", and slower cuts like "Prices" are seen as less essential. Still, the album's bold production, Uzi's dynamic performance, and its cohesive yet eclectic vision cement it as a landmark in their discography, with Pitchfork and Rolling Stone hailing it as their best work for meeting sky-high expectations after years of label delays.

== Theme and artwork ==
Logo of the Heaven's Gate cult, which inspired the album's aesthetics

Original cover of Eternal Atake

Eternal Atake embraces a sci-fi and alien abduction theme, woven loosely through its music, skits, and visual presentation, creating a futuristic and otherworldly aesthetic. On March 7, 2020, a fan on Twitter observed that the album's 18 tracks are divided into three six-song segments, each tied to a distinct persona of Lil Uzi Vert—Baby Pluto (tracks 1–6), Renji (tracks 7–12), and Lil Uzi Vert (tracks 13–18)—a structure Uzi confirmed, describing that the first half represents taking off in a spaceship, while the second half depicts a cosmic journey. This narrative, though not rigidly enforced, is reflected in the album's spacey production, with tracks like "Homecoming" and "You Better Move" incorporating video game samples and synthesized effects that evoke a galactic soundscape. Rolling Stone describes the personas as guiding the album's emotional arc, from Baby Pluto's aggressive flexes to Renji's introspective vulnerability and Uzi's reflective cosmic musings.

The album's artwork stirred significant attention and controversy. On July 13, 2018, Uzi revealed an initial cover art, a reimagined version of the Heaven's Gate cult logo—infamous for the 1997 mass suicide of its members—featuring the words "Eternal Atake" inside a keyhole. The two surviving Heaven's Gate members criticized the use, with a representative stating in an email that Uzi's adaptation was a "direct and clear infringement" of their copyrights and trademarks, hinting at potential legal action, though no further developments were publicly reported. On March 2 and 3, 2020, Uzi pivoted by sharing three new cover art options on Twitter, engaging fans through polls to select the official artwork; the second cover was chosen, while the third was repurposed as the tracklist background and back cover for physical copies. The final artwork, combined with Uzi's promotion of UFO-themed Bugattis and sci-fi imagery, reinforced the album's intergalactic branding, aligning with its ambitious sonic and thematic vision.

== Release and promotion ==
Lil Uzi Vert began teasing Eternal Atake with the release of a promotional single, "New Patek", on September 18, 2018. On April 9, 2019, two additional promotional singles, "That's a Rack" and "Sanguine Paradise", were released. The album was initially slated for release on July 19, 2019, but Lil Uzi Vert later expressed uncertainty about the release date, which was ultimately missed. On November 30, 2019, Lil Uzi Vert announced via Twitter that the album's lead single would be a "dance record" titled "Futsal". The single, released as "Futsal Shuffle 2020" on December 13, 2019, became the album's first official single. The second single, "That Way", which interpolates the hook of Backstreet Boys' "I Want It That Way", was spontaneously released on March 1, 2020.

On March 3, 2020, Lil Uzi Vert released a 2-minute short film titled "Baby Pluto", directed by Gibson Hazard and Lil Uzi Vert, to tease the album's release. During an Instagram Live session on February 28, 2020, Lil Uzi Vert announced that Eternal Atake would drop within two weeks, hinting at a possible March 13, 2020, release. However, the album was unexpectedly released earlier on March 6, 2020. The following day, March 7, Lil Uzi Vert announced a deluxe edition on Twitter, confirming two tracks, "Bean (Kobe)" featuring Chief Keef and "Myron", both previously previewed on social media. They also teased completed collaborations with Young Thug, Future, A Boogie wit da Hoodie, and Lil Baby. The deluxe edition, titled Lil Uzi Vert vs. the World 2, was released on March 13, 2020.

== Critical reception ==
Eternal Atake ratings
Aggregate scores
| Source | Rating |
|---|---|
| Metacritic | 84/100 |
Review scores
| Source | Rating |
| AllMusic | 4/5 stars |
| Consequence | B+ |
| Exclaim! | 7/10 |
| HipHopDX | 4.0/5 |
| NME | 5/5 stars |
| Pitchfork | 8.4/10 |
| RapReviews | 6.5/10 |
| Rolling Stone | 4/5 stars |

Eternal Atake was met with widespread critical acclaim. At Metacritic, which assigns a normalized rating out of 100 to reviews from professional publications, the album received an average score of 84, based on nine reviews.

Writing for Consequence, M. T. Richards gave the album a favorable review, stating that "Eternal Atake splits the difference between P-Funk and electro. In an ironic twist of fate, the year's most futuristic rap album comes courtesy of someone who'd been dismissed as a relic". Richards further praises Uzi Vert's performance, saying that they sound "alert, refreshed, and sometimes thrilled" on the album. In her review for NME, Kyann-Sian Williams praised the album, writing that Uzi had "made another record that will stay close to the hearts of a generation of rap fans. [They are] surely our generation's Lil Wayne". Writing for Exclaim!, Kyle Mullin stated positive opinions regarding the album, praising the production as well as the transitions between songs. Mullin mentions that "Uzi nimbly switches from relatedly lovelorn speak-singing on 'Bust Me' to rugged, speedy punch line powerhouse on the very next track, 'Prices'. That transition is merely one of the energetic and unpredictable performative tricks Uzi pulls off on this stadium sized LP". Scott Glaysher of HipHopDX said, "There is no denying Lil Uzi Vert's unconventional version of rap has been polarizing for the better part of the last five years yet Eternal Atake should be celebrated. [They maneuver] within the cockpit of [their] comfort zone, navigating a galaxy of different genres while keeping the essence of rap at the forefront". Alphonse Pierre of Pitchfork gave the album a positive review, saying that "The expectations were otherworldly. And somehow, Uzi met those expectations. Eternal Atake is Uzi's greatest album to date, a scope-defying hour-long epic that couldn't be made by anyone else".

Fred Thomas of AllMusic saying "Even though it's a lengthy journey and some of the songs start to feel similar, nothing here is filler". Danny Schwartz of Rolling Stone was also positive towards the album, stating that "It is difficult to remember a rap album released to such fervid expectations, let alone one that lived up to those expectations. Eternal Atake is Lil Uzi Vert's best album yet, with a cohesiveness, slick concept, and performance that justifies every ounce of hype". In a mixed review, RapReviews critic Steve "Flash" Juon wrote the following: "If you absolutely can not stand rappers who should be called singers then you need to take a hard pass on Vert, but if you occasionally (or more often than that) enjoy the crooning, Vert is at least someone who can put it together in a way that is surprisingly decent and occasionally quite good."

=== Rankings ===
Select rankings of Eternal Atake
| Publication | List | Rank | Ref. |
|---|---|---|---|
| Billboard | The 50 Best Albums of 2020 | 23 | |
| Billboard | The 20 Best Rap Albums of 2020 | 4 | |
| Complex | The Best Albums of 2020 | 3 | |
| Consequence | Top 50 Albums of 2020 | 20 | |
| The Fader | The 50 Best Albums of 2020 | 49 | |
| NPR Music | The 50 Best Albums of 2020 | 9 | |
| Pitchfork | The 50 Best Albums of 2020 | 12 | |
| Rolling Stone | The 50 Best Albums of 2020 | 8 | |
| Rolling Stone | The 200 Greatest Hip-Hop Albums of All Time | 143 | |
| Time | The 10 Best Albums of 2020 | 5 | |
| Uproxx | The Best Albums of 2020 | 4 | |
| Vulture | The Best Albums of 2020 | 9 | |

=== Industry awards ===
Awards and nominations for Eternal Atake
| Year | Ceremony | Category | Result | Ref. |
|---|---|---|---|---|
| 2020 | American Music Awards | Favorite Album – Rap/Hip-Hop | Nominated | |
| 2021 | Billboard Music Awards | Top Rap Album | Nominated | |

== Commercial performance ==
Eternal Atake debuted atop the US Billboard 200 dated March 21, 2020, with 288,000 album-equivalent units (including 9,000 pure album sales). The album earned 400 million US streams in its first week, which was the fourth-largest streaming debut at the time of its release. It is Lil Uzi Vert's second US number-one album. The album remained at number one on the Billboard 200 in its second week with 247,000 album-equivalent units. It was sustained in part due to a deluxe edition which was released the following week. Eternal Atake was the seventh best selling album of 2020 with 1.860 million album-equivalent units in the United States.

Following its first week of availability, three songs from the album debuted in the top ten of the US Billboard Hot 100, led by "Baby Pluto" at number six, "Lo Mein" at number eight and "Silly Watch" at number nine, making Lil Uzi Vert the fourth act to debut at least three songs in the Hot 100's top 10 simultaneously. The same week, they charted 20 total songs, including all 18 from Eternal Atake (16 of which debuted).

Following its first day of release, Eternal Atake occupied every position within the top 20 on Spotify's US Top 50 chart, except three positions. The track "Baby Pluto" also dethroned Roddy Ricch's "The Box" from the top spot on the chart with over 3.3 million US streams, marking the first time the song descended from number one since late December 2019.

== Track listing ==
Baby Pluto
| No. | Title | Writer(s) | Producer(s) | Length |
|---|---|---|---|---|
| 1. | "Baby Pluto" | Symere Woods; Brandon Veal; Daniel Perez; Vincent DeLon; Ivison Smith | Brandon Finessin; Bugz Ronin; Cousin Vinny; Ike Beatz | 3:30 |
| 2. | "Lo Mein" | Woods; Veal; Perez | Brandon Finessin; Bugz Ronin | 3:15 |
| 3. | "Silly Watch" | Woods; Jonathan Priester | Supah Mario | 3:16 |
| 4. | "Pop" | Woods; Veal; Jordan Ortiz | Brandon Finessin; Oogie Mane | 3:47 |
| 5. | "You Better Move" | Woods; Veal | Brandon Finessin; Nick Seeley | 3:17 |
| 6. | "Homecoming" | Woods; Perez | Bugz Ronin | 3:34 |

Renji
| No. | Title | Writer(s) | Producer(s) | Length |
|---|---|---|---|---|
| 7. | "I'm Sorry" | Woods; Veal; Anton Mendo | Brandon Finessin; Starboy | 3:32 |
| 8. | "Celebration Station" | Woods; Veal; Tobias Dekker | Brandon Finessin; Outtatown | 3:15 |
| 9. | "Bigger Than Life" | Woods; Ortiz; Dylan Cleary-Krell | Oogie Mane; Dez Wright Beats | 3:13 |
| 10. | "Chrome Heart Tags" | Woods; Keith Cozart | Chief Keef | 3:33 |
| 11. | "Bust Me" | Woods; Perez | Bugz Ronin | 3:14 |
| 12. | "Prices" | Woods; Harold Harper; Jacques Webster II; Rogét Chahayed; Scott Mescudi; Kasseem Dean; Magnus Høiberg; Chauncey Hollis, Jr.; Brittany Hazzard; Carlton Mays, Jr.; Mike Dean | Harper | 3:53 |

Lil Uzi Vert
| No. | Title | Writer(s) | Producer(s) | Length |
|---|---|---|---|---|
| 13. | "Urgency" (featuring Syd) | Woods; Sydney Bennett; Nicholas Eaholtz; Wesley Glass; Robert Richardson | Wheezy; Bobby Raps | 3:01 |
| 14. | "Venetia" | Woods; Veal; Dekker | Brandon Finessin; Outtatown | 3:09 |
| 15. | "Secure the Bag" | Woods; Perez | Bugz Ronin | 3:58 |
| 16. | "P2" | Woods; Bryan Simmons | TM88 | 3:55 |
| 17. | "Futsal Shuffle 2020" (bonus track) | Woods; Veal; Mendo; Mees van der Bruggen; Cas van der Heijden | Brandon Finessin; Starboy; Mayyzo; Loesoe | 3:19 |
| 18. | "That Way" (bonus track) | Woods; Priester; Andres Espana; Milan Modi; Andreas Carlsson; Max Martin | Supah Mario; Felipe Spain; Yung Lan | 3:32 |
| Total length: | | | | 62:13 |

Notes

- "Pop" is stylized in all capital letters

Sample credits

- "You Better Move" contains elements of the video game Full Tilt! Pinball.
- "Celebration Station" contains a sample from "Raindrops (An Angel Cried)", as performed by Ariana Grande.
- "Prices" contains elements from "Way Back", written by Jacques Webster, Rogét Chahayed, Scott Mescudi, Kasseem Dean, Magnus Høiberg, Chauncey Hollis Jr., Brittany Hazzard, Carlton Mays Jr., and Mike Dean, as performed by Travis Scott; and an interpolation from "Hickory Dickory Dock".
- "P2" contains a sample from "XO Tour Llif3", as performed by Lil Uzi Vert.
- "Futsal Shuffle 2020" contains audio samples from Nardwuar and a live rendition of "Boredom", as performed by Tyler, the Creator.
- "That Way" contains an interpolation from "I Want It That Way", written by Andreas Carlsson and Max Martin, as performed by the Backstreet Boys.

== Personnel ==
Credits adapted from official liner notes.

- Chris Athens – mastering
- Kesha "K. Lee" Lee – mixing, recording
- Brendan Morawski – mixing (1, 2, 7, 8, 10, 11, 13–16, 18)
- Gina Vosti – mix engineering (1), mix assistance (2), engineering assistance (3, 4)
- Nathan Feler – engineering assistance (1)
- Montez Roberts – engineering assistance (4), recording assistance (15)
- Rodolfo "Fofo" Cruz – engineering assistance (4)
- Popnick – additional sounds (5)
- Anthony "Kaotic" Martinez – engineering assistance (5)
- Kam Krieger – engineering assistance (6)
- Chris Ku – engineering assistance (7)
- Jordan Franzino – engineering assistance (7)
- Wanmor – additional vocals (8, 9, 12, 13)
- The Ensemble – background vocals (8–13)

== Charts ==
=== Weekly charts ===
Weekly chart performance for Eternal Atake
| Chart (2020) | Peak position |
|---|---|
| Australian Albums (ARIA) | 1 |
| Australian Hip Hop/R&B Albums (ARIA) | 1 |
| Austrian Albums (Ö3 Austria) | 3 |
| Belgian Albums (Ultratop Flanders) | 3 |
| Belgian Albums (Ultratop Wallonia) | 33 |
| Canadian Albums (Billboard) | 1 |
| Czech Albums (ČNS IFPI) | 3 |
| Danish Albums (Hitlisten) | 4 |
| Dutch Albums (Album Top 100) | 2 |
| Finnish Albums (Suomen virallinen lista) | 4 |
| French Albums (SNEP) | 28 |
| German Albums (Offizielle Top 100) | 26 |
| Irish Albums (Official Charts) | 2 |
| Italian Albums (FIMI) | 8 |
| New Zealand Albums (RMNZ) | 2 |
| Norwegian Albums (VG-lista) | 2 |
| Slovak Albums (ČNS IFPI) | 3 |
| Swedish Albums (Sverigetopplistan) | 5 |
| Swiss Albums (Schweizer Hitparade) | 7 |
| UK Albums (Official Charts) | 3 |
| UK R&B Albums (Official Charts) | 12 |
| US Billboard 200 | 1 |
| US Top R&B/Hip-Hop Albums (Billboard) | 1 |

=== Year-end charts ===
2020 year-end chart performance for Eternal Atake
| Chart (2020) | Position |
|---|---|
| Australian Hip Hop/R&B Albums (ARIA) | 33 |
| Belgian Albums (Ultratop Flanders) | 114 |
| Canadian Albums (Billboard) | 14 |
| Danish Albums (Hitlisten) | 78 |
| Dutch Albums (Album Top 100) | 83 |
| New Zealand Albums (RMNZ) | 37 |
| US Billboard 200 | 6 |
| US Top R&B/Hip-Hop Albums (Billboard) | 4 |

2021 year-end chart performance for Eternal Atake
| Chart (2021) | Position |
|---|---|
| US Billboard 200 | 56 |
| US Top R&B/Hip-Hop Albums (Billboard) | 30 |

2022 year-end chart performance for Eternal Atake
| Chart (2022) | Position |
|---|---|
| US Billboard 200 | 85 |
| US Top R&B/Hip-Hop Albums (Billboard) | 55 |

2023 year-end chart performance for Eternal Atake
| Chart (2023) | Position |
|---|---|
| US Billboard 200 | 198 |

== Certifications ==
Certifications and sales for Eternal Atake
| Region | Certification | Certified units/sales |
|---|---|---|
| Canada (Music Canada) | 2× Platinum | 160,000^{‡} |
| Denmark (IFPI Danmark) | Gold | 10,000^{‡} |
| New Zealand (RMNZ) | Platinum | 15,000^{‡} |
| United Kingdom (BPI) | Gold | 100,000^{‡} |
| United States (RIAA) | 3× Platinum | 3,000,000^{‡} |
^{‡} Sales+streaming figures based on certification alone.

== Release history ==
Release dates and formats for Eternal Atake
| Region | Date | Format(s) | Edition | Ref. |
|---|---|---|---|---|
| Various | March 6, 2020 | Digital download; streaming | Standard | |
| Various | March 13, 2020 | Digital download; streaming | Deluxe: Lil Uzi Vert vs. the World 2 | |
| Various | October 30, 2020 | CD | Deluxe: Lil Uzi Vert vs. the World 2 | |

== See also ==
- List of Billboard 200 number-one albums of 2020
- 2020 in hip hop music
