= Futsal Shuffle 2020 =

2019 single by Lil Uzi Vert

Single by Lil Uzi Vert

from the album Eternal Atake
- Released: December 13, 2019
- Genre: Trap; dance; snap
- Length: 3:18
- Label: Generation Now; Atlantic
- Songwriters: Symere Woods; Brandon Veal; Anton Mendo; Mees van der Bruggen; Cas van der Heijden
- Producers: Brandon Finessin; Star Boy; Mayyzo; Loesoe

Lil Uzi Vert singles chronology
"Reply" (2019)	"Futsal Shuffle 2020" (2019)	"That Way" (2020)

Music video
- "Futsal Shuffle 2020" on YouTube

"Futsal Shuffle 2020", or simply titled "Futsal Shuffle" is a song by American rapper Lil Uzi Vert. It was released through Generation Now and Atlantic Records as the lead single from their second studio album, Eternal Atake on December 13, 2019. The song features three sound clips, including two of their interviews with Nardwuar during Breakout Winter Festival and Rolling Loud Festival in Vancouver, British Columbia and Miami, Florida, respectively, as well as from Tyler, the Creator's performance of "Boredom" at the 2019 Camp Flog Gnaw. The song debuted at number 5 on the Billboard Hot 100, outpeaking "XO Tour Llif3" as Vert's highest-charting single on the chart as a solo artist. The song itself has also inspired a dance based on the song with the same title.

== Background and promotion ==
On November 30, 2019, the rapper teased the release by sharing a preview that shows them dancing to the song on their social media. They called the dance the "Futsal Shuffle". They predicted the dance to "takeover 2020". However, this did not happen due to the COVID-19 pandemic.

== Critical reception ==
Tony M. Centeno at XXL described the song as an "upbeat banger" with a production "that incorporates EDM synths over a bass-heavy loop". Joshua Espinoza of Complex saw it as "a quintessential Uzi track" while lyrically, the track "delivers cocky lines about private jets, money, designer labels, and stealing other dudes' girls". Billboard's Lars Brandle thought the song "pours old school rave notes over the Philadelphia rapper's taut wordplay (and occasional gunshots)".

== Music video ==
An official video, directed by Jay Weneta, was released on January 6, 2020. In it, Lil Uzi Vert and their friends perform the song's titular "Futsal Shuffle" dance. The video includes scenes with "vibrant visual effects, including slow-motion touches, random bursts of fireworks and brief flashes of Sailor Mercury dancing.

== Charts ==
=== Weekly charts ===
Weekly chart performance for "Futsal Shuffle 2020"
Chart (2019–2020)	Peak position
Australia (ARIA)	62
Australia Hip Hop/R&B (ARIA)	17
Belgium (Ultratip Bubbling Under Flanders)	9
Canada Hot 100 (Billboard)	8
Ireland (IRMA)	36
Netherlands (Single Tip)	2
New Zealand Hot Singles (RMNZ)	4
Portugal (AFP)	87
Slovakia Singles Digital (ČNS IFPI)	94
Sweden Heatseeker (Sverigetopplistan)	6
Switzerland (Schweizer Hitparade)	46
UK Singles (Official Charts)	57
UK Hip Hop/R&B (Official Charts)	28
US Billboard Hot 100	5
US Hot R&B/Hip-Hop Songs (Billboard)	2
US Rolling Stone Top 100	2

=== Year-end charts ===
Year-end chart performance for "Futsal Shuffle 2020"
Chart (2020)	Position
Canada (Canadian Hot 100)	82
US Hot R&B/Hip-Hop Songs (Billboard)	59

== Certifications ==
Certifications for "Futsal Shuffle 2020"
Region	Certification	Certified units/sales
Canada (Music Canada)	2× Platinum	160,000^{‡}
New Zealand (RMNZ)	Gold	15,000^{‡}
United States (RIAA)	2× Platinum	2,000,000^{‡}
^{‡} Sales+streaming figures based on certification alone.
