= 2020 in hip-hop =

This article summarizes the events, album releases, and album release dates in hip-hop for the year 2020.

== Events ==
=== January ===
- On January 1, Saint Paul, Minnesota, rapper Lexii Alijai died of an accidental drug overdose.
- On January 2, DaBaby was detained by Miami police for robbery investigations.
- On January 6, G Herbo pled guilty to battery. On the same day, Florida rapper 9lokkNine was arrested for carrying a concealed firearm and potentially faces up to five years in prison.
- On January 9, New Orleans bounce rapper 5thward Weebie died of a heart attack.
- On January 17, Eminem released his eleventh studio album, Music to Be Murdered By, with no prior announcement and he became the first artist ever to have 10 consecutive albums debuting at number one on the Billboard 200. On the same day, New York rapper Pop Smoke was released from jail on a bond of $250,000 after having been arrested with a stolen Rolls-Royce vehicle worth $375,000. He was prohibited to leave the United States without the government's permission.
- On January 26, Tyler, the Creator won a Grammy for Best Rap Album with Igor, and 21 Savage won a Grammy for Best Rap Song with "A Lot" featuring J. Cole. Nipsey Hussle posthumously won two Grammys for Best Rap/Sung Performance with "Higher" with DJ Khaled and John Legend, and Best Rap Performance for "Racks in the Middle" with Roddy Ricch and Hit-Boy.

=== February ===
- On February 19, Pop Smoke was murdered in a home invasion robbery in Hollywood Hills California.
- On February 21, it was announced that Paul Rosenberg would be stepping down as CEO of Def Jam.

=== March ===
- On March 8, a person was shot at a Lil Baby concert in Birmingham.
- On March 30, Kodak Black was sentenced to 12 months in prison.

=== April ===
- On April 2, 6ix9ine was released from prison because of his health condition due to COVID-19 concerns. He was on house arrest for the remainder of his sentence which ended in August the same year. On the same day, YNW Melly told fans he was diagnosed with COVID-19 in a Florida jail.
- On April 3, Playboi Carti was arrested on gun and drug charges in Georgia. Police found guns, 12 bags of marijuana, Xanax, codeine and oxycodone.
- On April 6, Mac P Dawg, a frequent collaborator of Shoreline Mafia, was shot and killed.
- On April 8, rapper and model Chynna died of an apparent drug overdose.
- On April 16, French Montana and Jim Jones squashed their beef after 15 years.
- On April 21, Lil Wayne launched Young Money Radio on Apple Music.
- On April 23, Fred the Godson died of COVID-19 complications.
- On April 28, Orlando, Florida, rapper LPB Poody and three other people were shot during a visual.

=== May ===
- On May 7, rapper Richie Jerk was shot and killed in Chicago while driving with a friend.

=== June ===
- On June 19, Chicago rapper Tray Savage was shot and killed. On the same day, Hurricane Chris was arrested for murder in Louisiana.
- On June 25, rapper Huey was shot and killed in St Louis, Missouri.
- On June 30, rapper Stepa J. Groggs of Injury Reserve died.

=== July ===
- On July 4, Kanye West announced his 2020 presidential campaign.
- On July 12, rapper Marlo was shot and killed.
- On July 13, Tory Lanez was arrested for gun possession. He is also accused of shooting Megan Thee Stallion in the foot.
- On July 29, American rapper and singer Malik B. died. He was a founding member of hip-hop group The Roots. On the same day, British rapper Wiley was permanently suspended from Twitter over antisemitic comments. He was banned from Facebook and Instagram just days prior.

=== August ===
- On August 4, Chicago rapper FBG Duck was shot and killed at a shopping area in Chicago's Gold Coast.
- On August 5, Juelz Santana was released from prison.
- On August 6, rapper YBN Nahmir announced via Twitter that the YBN collective has officially disbanded.
- On August 9, Rick Ross squashed his beef with 50 Cent.
- On August 11, the XXL 2020 Freshman Class was revealed, in which rappers Polo G, Lil Tjay, Jack Harlow, Baby Keem, Lil Keed, Calboy, Fivio Foreign, Latto, NLE Choppa, 24kGoldn, Rod Wave, and Chika.
- On August 29, Silentó was arrested for domestic violence in Santa Ana, California.

=== September ===
- On September 8, Juicy J and DJ Paul sued Suicideboys for $6.4 million.
- On September 15, Cardi B filed for divorced from Offset.
- On September 30, Nicki Minaj gave birth to a son with her husband Kenneth Petty.

=== October ===
- On October 1, 6ix9ine was hospitalized due to overdosing on caffeine and weight loss pills.
- On October 8, Tory Lanez was arrested for the felony assault with a weapon in the shooting of Megan Thee Stallion.
- On October 12, Blac Youngsta was arrested for possession of a firearm. On the same day, Fivio Foreign was arrested for assault.
- On October 13, Saint Dog was pronounced dead after being found unresponsive.
- On October 14, Lil Xan was sued for pulling a gun on a man during a 2Pac argument.
- On October 23, Young Buck was arrested for domestic assault.
- On October 31, MF Doom died. His death wasn't publicly announced until December 31.

=== November ===
- On November 4, Drakeo the Ruler was released from prison.
- On November 6, King Von was shot and killed in Atlanta, Georgia.
- On November 11, MO3 was shot and killed in Dallas, Texas.
- On November 15, Benny the Butcher was shot in Houston outside of a Walmart.
- On November 17, Lil Wayne was arrested and charged with possession of a firearm.
- On November 19, Gucci Mane and Jeezy squashed their beef after 15 years during a Verzuz battle.
- On November 28, Lil Yase was shot and killed in Alameda County, California.

=== December ===
- On December 1, Casanova was charged by the FBI for racketeering murder, narcotics, firearms, and fraud offenses. Later on, he turned himself into the authorities.
- On December 2, G Herbo was allegedly charged in fraud scheme for using fake identification.
- On December 4, Young M.A was arrested for reckless driving.
- On December 8, A Boogie wit da Hoodie was arrested for drug and gun possession.
- On December 9, Zoey Dollaz was shot multiple times in Miami, Florida.
- On December 11, Lil Wayne pled guilty to a firearm charge.
- On December 15, Rowdy Rebel was released from prison.
- On December 23, Ecstasy of the group Whodini died.
- On December 31, MF Doom's death was made public. He died on October 31.

== Released albums ==
=== January ===
Day	Artist(s)	Album	Record label(s)	Entering chart position
1	Brother N.I.P	Conversation with the Gangstas	Psych Ward Ent	
3	Famous Dex	Dexter 2031	Rich Forever Music	
3	Teejayx6	2020	TF	
10	The Alchemist	The Good Book, Part 1: Joyful Noise	ALC	
10	Big Ghost Ltd	Carpe Noctem	Self-released	
10	Denzel Curry	13lood 1n + 13lood Out	Loma Vista	
10	Mick Jenkins	The Circus	Free Nation, Cinematic	
10	Moneybagg Yo	Time Served	N-Less, Interscope	Debuted at No. 3 on the Billboard 200
10	OG Maco	Maco Got That Flame	Desperado	
10	Quando Rondo	QPac	Never Broke Again, Atlantic	Debuted at No. 22 on the Billboard 200
10	Uncle Murda	Don't Come Outside, Vol. 2	ATM, Empire	
10	UnoTheActivist	Lost Files	Republic	
11	Awich	孔雀	Yentown	
13	Nick Cannon	The Miseducation Of The Negro You Love To Hate	Csalohcin	
17	070 Shake	Modus Vivendi	GOOD Music, Def Jam	
17	Eminem	Music to Be Murdered By	Shady, Aftermath, Interscope, Goliath	Debuted at No. 1 on the Billboard 200
17	Mac Miller	Circles	Warner	Debuted at No. 3 on the Billboard 200
17	Mura Masa	R.Y.C.	Polydor, Anchor Point	
17	The Professionals (Oh No and Madlib)	The Professionals	Madlib Invazion	
17	Stunna 4 Vegas	Rich Youngin	Billion Dollar Baby, Interscope	Debuted at No. 29 on the Billboard 200
17	Theophilus London	Bebey	Independent	
17	Various artists	Bad Boys for Life – The Soundtrack	We The Best, Epic	Debuted at No. 63 on the Billboard 200
20	Kota the Friend	Lyrics to Go Vol. 1	Fltbys	
21	Icewear Vezzo	Drank Baby	Iced Up	
24	Gawne	Terminal	Self-released	
24	J Hus	Big Conspiracy	Black Butter	Debuted at No. 1 on the UK Albums Chart
24	Junia-T	Studio Monk	Bare Wizardry	
24	M Huncho	Huncholini the 1st	Island	Debuted at No. 5 on the UK Albums Chart
24	Sy Ari Da Kid	It Was Unwritten	Self-released	
27	Cardo	Game Related	EI$G, TFM, BYLUG	
31	10k.Caash	Planet Swajjur	Def Jam	
31	DJ Fresh and Curren$y	The Tonite Show with Currensy	The Flesh, RBC	
31	Key Glock	Yellow Tape	Paper Route, Empire	Debuted at No. 14 on the Billboard 200
31	Lil Wayne	Funeral	Young Money, Republic	Debuted at No. 1 on the Billboard 200
31	Philthy Rich	Hometown Hero	Empire	
31	Rob Stone	Stone Cold	Grove Town, Create	
31	Russ	Shake the Snow Globe	Columbia	Debuted at No. 4 on the Billboard 200
31	Yo Gotti	Untrapped	Inevitable II Records, CMG, Epic	Debuted at No. 10 on the Billboard 200
31	Plies	The Real Testament II	Slip-N-Slide	

=== February ===
Day	Artist(s)	Album	Record label(s)	Entering chart position
2	Esham	She Loves Me	Reel Life Productions	
4	Marv Won	Until...	Self-released	
4	Navy Blue	Àdá Irin	Freedom Sounds	
7	2 Chainz and T.R.U	No Face No Case	T.R.U., Atlantic	Debuted at No. 182 on the Billboard 200
7	Boldy James and The Alchemist	The Price of Tea in China	Boldy James, ALC Records, Empire	
7	Denzel Curry and Kenny Beats	Unlocked	PH Recordings, Loma Vista	Debuted at No. 105 on the Billboard 200
7	D Smoke	Black Habits	WoodWork Records, Empire	
7	Jaz-O	The Warmup	Kingz Kounty Media Group	
7	Pop Smoke	Meet the Woo 2	Victor Victor, Republic	Debuted at No. 7 on the Billboard 200
7	Toosii	Platinum Heart	South Coast Music Group	Debuted at No. 196 on the Billboard 200
10	Wiz Khalifa	It's Only Weed Bro	Taylor Gang	
11	LightSkinKeisha	Talk That Talk	StreamCut	
14	A Boogie wit da Hoodie	Artist 2.0	Highbridge, Atlantic	Debuted at No. 2 on the Billboard 200
14	Boosie BadAzz & Mo3	BadAzz Mo3	Empire	
14	Che Noir & 38 Spesh	Juno	TCF	
14	Fetty Wap	Trap & B	RGF, 300	
14	Jalen Santoy	II Shepherds	Empire	
14	Kidd Kenn	Child's Play	Island	
14	Lil' Flip	Feelings	GT Digital, Clover G	
14	Lil' Flip	No Feelings	GT Digital, Lil Flip	
14	Marlo	1st N 3rd	Quality Control	
14	$uicideBoy$	Stop Staring at the Shadows	G*59 Records	Debuted at No. 30 on the Billboard 200
14	Tink	Hopeless Romantic	Winter's Diary, Empire	
14	Twista	Lifetime	GMG Entertainment	
14	Vinnie Paz	As Above So Below	Enemy Soil	
14	Yung Gravy and Bbno$	Baby Gravy 2	Baby Gravy	Debuted at No. 188 on the Billboard 200
20	Esham	She Loves Me Not	Reel Life Productions	
21	BTS	Map of the Soul: 7	Big Hit, Dreamus	
21	Calboy	Long Live the Kings	RCA	Debuted at No. 136 on the Billboard 200
21	Deniro Farrar	Sole Food	Cultrap, BetterVibes	
21	Duke Deuce	Memphis Massacre 2	Quality Control	
21	Kamaiyah	Got It Made	Empire	
21	Lil Gotit	Superstar Creature	Alamo	
21	Money Man	Epidemic	Black Circle, Empire	Debuted at No. 121 on the Billboard 200
21	Royce Da 5'9"	The Allegory	Heaven Studios, eOne	Debuted at No. 58 on the Billboard 200
21	YoungBoy Never Broke Again	Still Flexin, Still Steppin	Never Broke Again, Atlantic	Debuted at No. 2 on the Billboard 200
24	Young Nudy	Anyways...	Same Plate Entertainment, RCA	Debuted at No. 109 on the Billboard 200
25	Bones	Offline	TeamSESH	
26	Princess Nokia	Everything Is Beautiful	Self-released	
26	Princess Nokia	Everything Sucks	Self-released	
26	ShooterGang Kony	Red Paint Reverend	Empire	
28	G Herbo	PTSD	Machine, Epic Records	Debuted at No. 7 on the Billboard 200
28	Haleek Maul	Errol	Lex	
28	Iamsu & Kool John	The Pop Up, Vol. 1	Shmoplife, Eyes On Me	
28	Kassa Overall	I Think I'm Good	Brownswood	
28	Lil Baby	My Turn	4PF, Wolfpack, Quality Control, Motown	Debuted at No. 1 on the Billboard 200
28	Planet Asia and 38 Spesh	Trust the Chain	T.C.F.	
28	Smoke DZA	A Closed Mouth Don't Get Fed	RFC, Cinematic	
28	The Jacka	Murder Weapon	Empire	
28	Scarlxrd	Scarhxurs	Island	
28	Stro	Back on Saratoga	Mass Appeal, Grade A Tribe	
28	YFN Lucci	HIStory, Lost Pages	Think It's A Game, Warner	
28	Young Chop	Young Godfather	Chopsquad	
28	Zaytoven, Lil Yachty, Lil Gotit and Lil Keed	A-Team	Familiar Territory, Opposition	
29	Bad Bunny	YHLQMDLG	Rimas	

=== March ===
Day	Artist(s)	Album	Record label(s)	Entering chart position
2	Drakeo the Ruler	Free Drakeo	Self-released	
2	Xavier Wulf & Bones	Brace	TeamSesh	
3	DPR Live	Is Anybody Out There?	Dream Perfect Regime, Kakao M	
3	Juelz Santana	Free Santana	The Dispensary	
4	Bankroll Fresh	In Bank We Trust	Street Money	
4	Larry June	Adjust to the Game	The Freeminded	
5	Yung Mal	6 Rings	Alamo	
6	Blacc Zacc	Carolina Narco	South Coast, Interscope	
6	Body Count	Carnivore	Century Media	
6	Chief Keef	The GloFiles (Pt. 4)	Digiglo	
6	CJ Fly	Rudebwoy	Pro Era	
6	DJ Kay Slay	Living Legend	StreetSweepers, Empire	
6	Grafh	The Oracle 3	Team Bang Dope Gang	
6	Jadakiss	Ignatius	So Raspy, D-Block, Def Jam	Debuted at No. 31 on the Billboard 200
6	King Von	LeVon James	Only the Family, Empire	Debuted at No. 63 on the Billboard 200
6	Kxng Crooked	The Sixteen Chapel	Hitmaker Music Group, New Wave Distro	
6	Lil Uzi Vert	Eternal Atake	Generation Now, Atlantic	Debuted at No. 1 on the Billboard 200
6	Megan Thee Stallion	Suga	1501 Certified, 300	Debuted at No. 10 on the Billboard 200
6	R.A.P. Ferreira	Purple Moonlight Pages	Ruby Yacht	
6	Riz Ahmed	The Long Goodbye	Mongrel	
6	$not	Tragedy +	Self-released	
6	Suigeneris	Demons N Angels	Devilgear, Empire	
13	070 Phi	My Father's Gun	Mass Appeal	
13	Blueface	Find the Beat	Cash Money West, Cash Money, Republic	Debuted at No. 64 on the Billboard 200
13	Chika	Industry Games	Warner	
13	Curren$y and Fendi P	Smokin' Potnas	Jet Life, Empire	
13	DJ Esco and Doe Boy	56 Birdz	Freebandz, Epic	
13	Don Toliver	Heaven or Hell	We Run It, Cactus Jack, Atlantic	Debuted at No. 7 on the Billboard 200
13	Jack Harlow	Sweet Action	Generation Now, Atlantic	Debuted at No. 36 on the Billboard 200
13	Jay Electronica	A Written Testimony	Roc Nation	Debuted at No. 12 on the Billboard 200
13	Jelly Roll	A Beautiful Disaster	War Dog	Debuted at No. 97 on the Billboard 200
13	King Iso	World War Me	Strange Music	
13	Lil Uzi Vert	Lil Uzi Vert vs. the World 2	Generation Now, Atlantic	
13	Rich the Kid	Boss Man	Rich Forever Music, Republic	Debuted at No. 24 on the Billboard 200
13	Tec	Web Life Vol. 3	Empire	
13	Zaytoven	Zone Connect	Opposition	
17	Lil' Flip	The Leprechaun 2	GT Digital, Clover G	
18	ZelooperZ	Gremlin	Bruiser Brigade	
20	Da$h	Walk The Plank	Hz	
20	Hare Squead	Superweird	Self-released	
20	Money Man	State of Emergency	Black Circle, Empire	Debuted at No. 56 on the Billboard 200
20	Paul Wall	Mind over Matter	Oiler Mobb Ent	
20	Sada Baby	Skuba Sada 2	Asylum	Debuted at No. 125 on the Billboard 200
20	Statik Selektah & Termanology	1982 - The Quarantine	Showoff	
20	The Weeknd	After Hours	XO, Republic	Debuted at No. 1 on the Billboard 200
20	Xanman	I'm A Bad Person	Self-released	
22	Childish Gambino	3.15.20	RCA	Debuted at No. 13 on the Billboard 200
22	IceJJFish	Jesus Is The Way	Self-released	
26	Trevor Daniel	Nicotine	Alamo, Internet Money, Interscope	Debuted at No. 79 on the Billboard 200
27	42 Dugg	Young & Turnt, Vol. 2	4PF, CMG, Empire	Debuted at No. 70 on the Billboard 200
27	Comethazine	Pandemic	Alamo, Empire	Debuted at No. 151 on the Billboard 200
27	Jeezy	Twenty/20 Pyrex Vision	Agency 99	Debuted at No. 115 on the Billboard 200
27	Joyner Lucas	ADHD	Twenty Nine Music Group	Debuted at No. 10 on the Billboard 200
27	Quin NFN	Quincho	10K Projects	
27	Knxwledge	1988	Stones Throw	
27	Nef the Pharaoh	ChangeSzn	KILFMB	
27	PartyNextDoor	Partymobile	OVO Sound, Warner	Debuted at No. 8 on the Billboard 200
27	Skepta, Chip and Young Adz	Insomnia	SKC M29	Debuted at No. 3 on the UK Albums Chart
27	Slim Thug	Thug Life	Hogg Life	
30	Conway the Machine and The Alchemist	Lulu	ALC Records, Griselda Records, Empire	

=== April ===
Day	Artist(s)	Album	Record label(s)	Entering chart position
2	Code Kunst	People	AOMG	Debuted at No. 10 on the Gaon Album Chart
2	Young Chop	The Intro X Young Godfather	Chopsquad	
3	A$AP Twelvyy	Before Noon	Last Year Being Broke(n)	
3	Headie One and Fred Again	Gang	Relentless Records	
3	Kerser	Roll the Dice	ABK, Warner Music Australia	Debuted at No. 3 on the ARIA Australian Top 50 Albums
3	Rod Wave	Pray 4 Love	Alamo	Debuted at No. 2 on the Billboard 200
3	Shordie Shordie	>Music	Warner	
7	Kari Faux	Lowkey Superstar	Change Minds	
8	Z-Ro	Quarantine: Social Distancing	1 Deep Entertainment, Empire	
9	Dee Watkins	Chosen One	Alamo	
9	Lil B	Gutta Dealership	Basedworld	
10	2kBaby	Pregame Rituals	Warner	
10	22Gz	Growth & Development	Sniper Gang, Atlantic	
10	Boosie Badazz	Goat Talk 2	Self-released	
10	Cadet	The Rated Legend	Underrated Legends	Debuted at No. 13 on the UK Albums Chart
10	Cormega	Mega	Aura	
10	Curren$y and Cardo	The Green Tape	Jet Life Recordings	
10	DJ Drama and 24hrs	12 AM in Atlanta	Private Club, Rostrum	
10	Killarmy	Full Metal Jackets	Granddaddy Flow	
10	Kool Keith and Thetan	Space Goretex	Anti-Corp	
10	Tory Lanez	The New Toronto 3	Mad Love, Interscope	Debuted at No. 2 on the Billboard 200
10	YSN Flow	Flow SZN	Republic	
15	Kenny Mason	Angelic Hoodrat	RCA	
17	Berner and B-Real	Los Meros	Bern One Entertainment	
17	Buddy & Kent Jamz	Janktape Vol. 1	RCA	
17	DaBaby	Blame It on Baby	SCMG, Interscope	Debuted at No. 1 on the Billboard 200
17	Dvsn	A Muse in Her Feelings	OVO Sound, Warner	Debuted at No. 23 on the Billboard 200
17	Fredo Bang	Most Hated	Bang Biz, Def Jam	Debuted at No. 110 on the Billboard 200
17	Khujo	Echoes of a Legend	Self-released	
17	R.A. the Rugged Man	All My Heroes Are Dead	Nature Sounds Records	
17	RJD2	The Fun Ones	RJ's Electrical Connections	
17	RJMrLa & Royce The Choice	Rich Off Mackin 2	Ommio, Empire	
17	Shabazz Palaces	The Don of Diamond Dreams	Sub Pop	
17	Tech N9ne	Enterfear	Strange Music	Debuted at No. 92 on the Billboard 200
17	Westside Gunn	Pray for Paris	Griselda, Empire	Debuted at No. 67 on the Billboard 200
19	Daz Dillinger and Big Gipp	A.T.L.A.	Dilly Records	
20	Bones & Drew the Architect	DamagedGoods	TeamSESH	
20	Smino	She Already Decided	Zero Fatigue	
20	Smoke DZA	Worldwide Smoke Session	The Smokers Club, RFC, Cinematic	
20	Twiztid	Mad Season	Majik Ninja Entertainment	
20	Upchurch	Everlasting Country	RHEC, Stonebaby Sounds	Debuted at No. 61 on the Billboard 200
20	Wiz Khalifa	The Saga of Wiz Khalifa	Taylor Gang, Atlantic	Debuted at No. 48 on the Billboard 200
21	Melo	Old Master	88rising	
23	Asher Roth	Flowers on the Weekend	Retrohash	
24	Fivio Foreign	800 BC	RichFish, Columbia	Debuted at No. 159 on the Billboard 200
24	Jackboy	Jackboy	Sniper Gang, Empire	Debuted at No. 96 on the Billboard 200
24	K Camp	Kiss Five	Rare Sound, Interscope	Debuted at No. 29 on the Billboard 200
24	K.A.A.N. and FloFilz	Lost in Translation	Redefinition Records	
24	Lil Gotit	Hood Baby 2	Alamo Records, Empire	Debuted at No. 200 on the Billboard 200
24	Nieman J & Eric Bellinger	Optimal Music	Off Top	
24	Quelle Chris and Chris Keys	Innocent Country 2	Mello Music Group	
24	Skyzoo & Dumbo Station	The Bluest Note	Tuff Kong, First Generation Rich	
24	Slim 400	Shake Back	Empire	
24	Stalley	Pariah	Blue Collar Gang	
24	Trouble	Thug Luv	EarDrummers, Def Jam	
24	Wiley	Back to the Village	CTA	
24	YoungBoy Never Broke Again	38 Baby 2	Never Broke Again, Atlantic	Debuted at No. 1 on the Billboard 200
27	Jon Connor	SOS	All Varsity Music Group	
28	Tate Kobang	Wrote on My Body	Unruly	
28	Waka Flocka Flame	Salute Me or Shoot Me 7	Brick Squad Monopoly	

=== May ===
Day	Artist(s)	Album	Record label(s)	Entering chart position
1	Ace Hood	Self Preservation	Hood Nation, Empire	
1	Casual	Big Head Science	Mystery School Audio	
1	Dee-1	Timeless	Mission Vision Music	
1	Drake	Dark Lane Demo Tapes	OVO, Republic	Debuted at No. 2 on the Billboard 200
1	E.D.I. Mean	O.G. Volume II: Classics in Session	O4L Digital	
1	Lil' Flip and Tum Tum	Made in Texas	Music Access	
1	Jay Worthy and Harry Fraud	Eat When You're Hungry Sleep When You're Tired	SRFSCHL, GDF	
1	Ka	Descendants of Cain	Iron Works Records	
1	Mozzy	Beyond Bulletproof	Mozzy Records, Empire	Debuted at No. 43 on the Billboard 200
1	Nef the Pharaoh	Changszn 2	Kilfmb, Sick Wid It, Empire	
1	Rasheed Chappell and 38 Spesh	Ways & Means	T.C.F. Music Group	
1	Rob Vicious	Breakthrough	Atlantic	
1	Sha Money XL	Chain on the Bike Vol. 1	Teamwork Music	
1	Smoove'L	Boy From Brooklyn	Run, Interscope	
1	Yxng Bane	Quarantime: The Lost Files	London Records	Debuted at No. 11 on the UK Albums Chart
5	Chris Brown and Young Thug	Slime & B	CBE, YSL, 300, Atlantic, RCA	Debuted at No. 55 on the Billboard 200
6	Little Simz	Drop 6	Age 101, AWAL	
8	Bishop Nehru	Nehruvia: My Disregarded Thoughts	Nehruvia	
8	E-40	The Curb Commentator Channel 1	Sick Wid It	
8	JGreen	510	510, Empire	
8	Larry June and Cardo	Cruise USA	The Freeminded	
8	Lil Durk	Just Cause Y'all Waited 2	OTF, Alamo, Geffen	Debuted at No. 5 on the Billboard 200
8	Lil Tjay	State of Emergency	Columbia	Debuted at No. 31 on the Billboard 200
8	Nav	Good Intentions	XO, Republic	Debuted at No. 1 on the Billboard 200
8	Ress	Himalaya	Universal Music Hungary	
8	Yella Beezy and Trapboy Freddy	I'm My Brother's Keeper	HITCO, 300	
11	Nav	Brown Boy 2	XO, Republic	
12	Fatt Father	King Father	Fueled by Life	
13	Deante' Hitchcock	Better	ByStorm, RCA	
15	Conway the Machine and Big Ghost LTD	No One Mourns the Wicked	Griselda, Big Ghost Limited, De Rap Winkel	
15	Future	High Off Life	Freebandz, Epic	Debuted at No. 1 on the Billboard 200
15	OMB Peezy & DrumDummie	In The Meantime	300	
15	Polo G	The Goat	Columbia	Debuted at No. 2 on the Billboard 200
15	Quentin Miller	Na Fr.	1317	
15	Roy Woods	Dem Times	OVO Sound, Warner	
15	Scrim	A Man Rose from the Dead	G*59 Records	
15	Sheff G	One and Only	Winners Circle, Empire	Debuted at No. 99 on the Billboard 200
15	Tha Chill	Fohead	Bump Johnson	
15	Yung Lean	Starz	Year0001	Debuted at No. 39 on the Sverigetopplistan
20	Young Buck	Outbreak	Cashville Records	
	Archie Shepp, Raw Poetic and Damu the Fudgemunk	Ocean Bridges	22nd Century Sound	
22	Dej Loaf	It's a Set Up!	Yellow World, The Dispensary	
22	Gunna	Wunna	YSL, 300	Debuted at No. 1 on the Billboard 200
22	Hoodrich Pablo Juan	Hood Champ	Empire	
22	Ill Bill and Nems	Gorilla Twins	Uncle Howie Records	
22	Key Glock	Son of a Gun	Paper Route, Empire	Debuted at No. 37 on the Billboard 200
22	Kota the Friend	Everything	Fltbys	Debuted at No. 162 on the Billboard 200
22	KSI	Dissimulation	RBC Records, BMG Rights Management	Debuted at No. 2 on the UK Albums Chart; Debuted at No. 149 on the Billboard 200
22	Skooly	Nobody Likes Me	Atlantic	
22	Styles P	Styles David: Ghost Your Enthusiasm	The Phantom Entertainment, Empire	
22	Young M.A	Red Flu	M.A Music	
25	Gorilla Zoe	Vaccine	Self-released	
27	10k.Caash	Left Alone	10k	
27	Psy. P	Psylife.25	88rising	
27	Rittz	White Jesus Loosies Collection	CNT Records	
28	Backxwash	God Has Nothing to Do with This Leave Him Out of It	Grimalkin	
29	Ace Hood	Mr. Hood	Hood Nation, Empire	
29	Dej Loaf	No Saint	Yellow World	
29	Freddie Gibbs and The Alchemist	Alfredo	ESGN, ALC Records	Debuted at No. 15 on the Billboard 200
29	Joell Ortiz and KXNG Crooked	H.A.R.D.	Mello Music Group	
29	Lil Poppa	Evergreen Wildchild 2	Interscope	
29	Lil Yachty	Lil Boat 3	Quality Control Music, Motown Records	Debuted at No. 14 on the Billboard 200
29	Lucki	Almost There	Empire	
29	Medhane	Cold Water	Never Panicking	
29	Powfu	Poems of the Past	Columbia Records	Debuted at No. 138 on the Billboard 200
29	Problem	Coffee & Kush, Vol. 1	Diamond Lane Music Group	
31	Bones	Remains	TeamSESH	
31	Killah Priest	Rocket to Nebula	Proverbs Records	

=== June ===
Day	Artist(s)	Album	Record label(s)	Entering chart position
3	Run the Jewels	RTJ4	Jewel Runners, BMG Records	Debuted at No. 10 on the Billboard 200
5	Armand Hammer	Shrines	Backwoodz Studios	
5	Drakeo the Ruler	Thank You For Using GTL	Stinc Team	
5	Flatbush Zombies	Now, More Than Ever	Glorious Dead Records	Debuted at No. 168 on the Billboard 200
5	JayDaYoungan	Baby23	Self-released	Debuted at No. 46 on the Billboard 200
5	Paul Wall and Lil' Keke	Slab Talk	SoSouth	
5	Sleepy Hallow	Sleepy for President	Winners Circle, Empire	Debuted at No. 48 on the Billboard 200
5	Wiley	The Godfather III	CTA Records	
12	Boosie Badazz	In House	Self-released	
12	Iann Dior	I'm Gone	Internet Money, Caroline	Debuted at No. 45 on the Billboard 200
12	Naeem	Startisha	37d03d	
12	Scarlxrd	Fantasy Vxid	Lxrd Records, Island	
12	Sy Ari Da Kid	A Toxic Heartbreak	No I in Team	
12	RMR	Drug Dealing Is a Lost Art	Cmnty Culture, Warner	
16	Marlon Craft	Work From Home	Same Plate	
17	Lex "The Hex" Master	Episode 1, Party Castle	Majik Ninja Entertainment	
19	Black Eyed Peas	Translation	Epic	Debuted at No. 52 on the Billboard 200
19	Curren$y and Fuse	Spring Clean	808 Mafia, Jet Life, Empire	
19	Joe Moses	Westside 2	Empire	
19	Kierra Luv	Take It or Leave It	10K Projects	
19	Meyhem Lauren	Glass 2.0	SRFSCHL	
19	Skyzoo	Milestones	Mello Music Group	
19	Smokepurpp	Florida Jit	Alamo, Geffen	
19	Tee Grizzley	The Smartest	300	Debuted at No. 22 on the Billboard 200
19	Teyana Taylor	The Album	GOOD Music, Def Jam	Debuted at No. 8 on the Billboard 200
19	Wale	The Imperfect Storm	Maybach, Warner	
20	City Girls	City on Lock	Quality Control, Motown	Debuted at No. 29 on the Billboard 200
21	Mike	Weight of the World	10k	
21	Starlito	Paternity Leave	Grind Hard	
22	Knxwledge	10000 Proof	Stones Throw	
22	Nasty C & DJ Whoo Kid	Zulu	Universal Music South Africa, Def Jam	
25	ProfJam and Benji Price	System	Think Music Records, Sony Music	
26	6lack	6pc Hot	Interscope	Debuted at No. 15 on the Billboard 200
26	88Glam	New Mania	Self-released	
26	August Alsina	The Product III: State of Emergency	Shake the World, Empire	Debuted at No. 48 on the Billboard 200
26	Bankrol Hayden	Pain Is Temporary	Atlantic, Warner Music Group	Debuted at No. 197 on the Billboard 200
26	CeeLo Green	CeeLo Green Is Thomas Callaway	Easy Eye Sound, BMG	
26	Fat Trel	Big Homie	Self-released	
26	G-Eazy	Everything's Strange Here	BPG, RVG, RCA	Debuted at No. 143 on the Billboard 200
26	IDK	IDK & Friends 2 (Basketball County Soundtrack)	Clue No Clue, Warner	
26	Kid Trunks	Moon	Empire	
26	Max B	Charly	Eloquent Music, Phase One Network	
26	Nasty C and DJ Whoo Kid	Zulu	Def Jam	
26	Nick Grant and Tae Beast	God Bless the Child	21 Grams, Tae Beast Music, Nick Grant Music	
26	Riff Raff	Vanilla Gorilla	From Canada	
26	Robb Banks	Calendars	Born Leaders	
26	Yungeen Ace	Don Dada	Cinematic Music Group	
26	Z-Ro	Rohammad Ali	1 Deep Entertainment, Empire	
27	Iron Wigs (Vic Spencer, Verbal Kent and Sonnyjim)	Your Birthday's Cancelled	Mello Music Group	

=== July ===
Day	Artist(s)	Album	Record label(s)	Entering chart position
1	Buckwild	Fully Loaded	Kurrup Music Ent.	
3	Chevy Woods	Since Birth	Taylor Gang	
3	Gaika	Seguridad	Naafi	
3	Gucci Mane	So Icy Summer	1017, Atlantic	Debuted at No. 29 on the Billboard 200
3	Rare Sound and K Camp	Rare Family	Rare Sound	
3	Pop Smoke	Shoot for the Stars, Aim for the Moon	Victor Victor, Republic	Debuted at No. 1 on the Billboard 200
3	Westside Gunn	Flygod is an Awesome God II	Griselda Records, Empire	
8	SahBabii	Barnacles	Casting Bait Music Group	
10	Apollo Brown and Che Noir	As God Intended	Mello Music Group	
10	Casey Veggies and Rockie Fresh	Fresh Veggies 2	PNCINTL	
10	Juice Wrld	Legends Never Die	Grade A Productions, Interscope	Debuted at No. 1 on the Billboard 200
10	Quinn XCII	A Letter to My Younger Self	Columbia	Debuted at No. 56 on the Billboard 200
10	The Streets	None of Us Are Getting Out of This Life Alive	Island	
10	Summer Walker	Life on Earth	LVRN, Interscope	Debuted at No. 8 on the Billboard 200
10	UnoTheActivist	8	Republic	
17	Blu & Exile	Miles: From an Interlude Called Life	Dirty Science	
17	J.I the Prince of N.Y	Welcome to GStarr Vol. 1	G*Starr Ent., Interscope, Geffen	
17	Joey Bada$$	The Light Pack	Pro Era, Cinematic, Columbia	
17	MBNel	Child of the Trenches	Empire	
17	NoCap	Steel Human	Never Broke Again, Atlantic	Debuted at No. 31 on the Billboard 200
17	Oddisee	Odd Cure	Outer Note Label	
17	StaySolidRocky	Fallin'	Columbia	Debuted at No. 65 on the Billboard 200
17	Kyle	See You When I Am Famous	Independently Popular, Atlantic	Debuted at No. 124 on the Billboard 200
17	Young Noble and Deuce Deuce	Watch the Signs	Concrete Enterprises	
22	Boldy James and Sterling Toles	Manger on McNichols	Sector 7-G Recordings	
24	Curren$y and Harry Fraud	The OutRunners	Jet Life Recordings	
24	Flo Milli	Ho, Why Is You Here?	RCA	Debuted at No. 78 on the Billboard 200
24	Justin Rarri	Youngest in Kharge	Interscope	
24	The Kid Laroi	F*ck Love	Grade A Productions, Columbia	Debuted at No. 3 on the ARIA Top 100 Albums Chart; Debuted at No. 8 on the Billboard 200
24	Logic	No Pressure	Def Jam Recordings	Debuted at No. 2 on the Billboard 200
24	Lupe Fiasco and Kaelin Ellis	House	1st and 15th, Thirty Tigers	
24	Sada Baby	Bartier Bounty 2	Big Squad	
24	Slim Thug and Killa Kyleon	Down in Texas	Hogg Life, Team Run It, SoSouth	
28	Soulja Boy	King Soulja 9	SODMG	
31	Akon	Ain't No Peace	Konvict Kulture	
31	City Morgue	Toxic Boogaloo	Republic	Debuted at No. 96 on the Billboard 200
31	DJ Drama, Benny the Butcher & Black Soprano Family	The Respected Sopranos	BSF, Gangsta Grillz, Griselda Records	
31	Dominic Fike	What Could Possibly Go Wrong	Sandy Boys, Columbia Records	Debuted at No. 41 on the Billboard 200
31	E-40	The Curb Commentator Channel 2	Sick Wid It Records	
31	Flee Lord and Pete Rock	The People's Champ	Loyalty Or Death	
31	Hit-Boy and Dom Kennedy	Also Known As	Half-A-Mil	
31	Shoreline Mafia	Mafia Bidness	Atlantic	Debuted at No. 27 on the Billboard 200

=== August ===
Day	Artist(s)	Album	Record label(s)	Entering chart position
7	Aminé	Limbo	Republic Records	Debuted at No. 16 on the Billboard 200
7	Gashi	1984	RCA	
7	L'Orange and Solemn Brigham	Marlowe 2	Mello Music Group	
7	Lil Keed	Trapped on Cleveland 3	YSL	Debuted at No. 41 on the Billboard 200
7	NLE Choppa	Top Shotta	Warner, Atlantic, No Love	Debuted at No. 10 on the Billboard 200
7	DC the Don	Come as You Are	Rostrum	
7	Stevie Stone	Black Lion	Strange Music	
8	Mach-Hommy	Mach's Hard Lemonade	Self-released	
14	03 Greedo and Ron-Ron the Producer	Load It Up, Vol 01	Golden Grenade Empire, Alamo	
14	Black Noise	Oblivion	Tan Cressida, Warner	
14	Boldy James	The Versace Tape	Griselda Records	
14	Dave East	Karma 3	Mass Appeal Records, Def Jam	Debuted at No. 36 on the Billboard 200
14	Kaash Paige	Teenage Fever	Se Lavi, Def Jam	
14	Ronny J	Jupiter	Self-released	
14	Tech N9ne	More Fear	Strange Music	
14	Trav	Nothing Happens Overnight	MBB, Team Eighty, Empire	
14	Young Dolph	Rich Slave	Paper Route Empire	Debuted at No. 4 on the Billboard 200
14	Various artists	Madden NFL 21 soundtrack	EA Music	
21	Blackbear	Everything Means Nothing	Beartrap, Alamo, Interscope	Debuted at No. 15 on the Billboard 200
21	Duckwrth	SuperGood	Republic	
21	Lecrae	Restoration	Cross Movement, Reach, Columbia	Debuted at No. 69 on the Billboard 200
21	Mulatto	Queen of Da Souf	RCA Records	Debuted at No. 44 on the Billboard 200
21	Nas	King's Disease	Mass Appeal	Debuted at No. 5 on the Billboard 200
26	Quando Rondo	Diary of a Lost Child	Self-released	
28	Internet Money	B4 the Storm	Internet Money	Debuted at No. 10 on the Billboard 200
28	Jackboy	Living in History	1804, Empire	
28	Jaden Smith	CTV3: Cool Tape Vol. 3	MSFTSMusic, Roc Nation	Debuted at No. 44 on the Billboard 200
28	KenTheMan	4 Da 304's	Self-released	
28	The Lox	Living Off Xperience	D-Block, Roc Nation	Debuted at No. 154 on the Billboard 200
28	Nines	Crabs in a Bucket	Zino, Warner	Debuted at No. 1 on the UK Albums Chart
28	Nasty C	Zulu Man with Some Power	Def Jam	
28	Radamiz	Synonyms of Strength	Payday, Ultra	
28	Saigon	777: The Resurrection	Point Blank	
28	Wifisfuneral	Pain?	Alamo	

=== September ===
Day	Artist(s)	Album	Record label(s)	Entering chart position
2	H1ghr	H1ghr : Red Tape	H1ghr	
2	LightSkinKeisha	Clones	StreamCut	
4	6ix9ine	TattleTales	Scumgang, Create Music Group	Debuted at No. 4 on the Billboard 200
4	Big Sean	Detroit 2	GOOD Music, Def Jam	Debuted at No. 1 on the Billboard 200
4	Jacquees	Exit 68	Self-released	
8	Wiz Khalifa	Big Pimpin	Self-released	
11	B.o.B	Somnia	Label No Genre	
11	Bobby Sessions	RVLTN 3: The Price of Freedom	Def Jam	
11	Conway the Machine	From King to a God	Drumwork, Griselda, Empire	Debuted at No. 126 on the Billboard 200
11	Paul Epworth	Voyager	Sony	
11	Tokyo's Revenge	7ven	Blac Noize	
11	YoungBoy Never Broke Again	Top	Atlantic, Never Broke Again	Debuted at No. 1 on the Billboard 200
12	Bizzy Bone	The Mantra	Self-released	
16	Berner	Russ Bufalino: The Quiet Don	Bern One Entertainment, Taylor Gang Entertainment	
18	Blac Youngsta and Moneybagg Yo	Code Red	N-Less, Interscope, Epic, CMG	Debuted at No. 6 on the Billboard 200
18	Curren$y and Harry Fraud	The Director's Cut	Jet Life, SRFSCHL	
18	Dee-1 and Murs	He's the Christian, I'm the Rapper	Mission Vision Music, Murs 316	
18	Dizzy Wright	My Hustle Unmatched	Dizzy Wright	
18	Grafh	Good Energy	Team Bang Dope Gang	
18	H1ghr	H1ghr: Blue Tape	H1ghr	
18	Kamaiyah and Capolow	Oakland Nights	Grnd.Wrk.	
18	Krizz Kaliko	Legend	Strange Music, Ingrooves	
18	Lil Tecca	Virgo World	Republic Records	Debuted at No. 10 on the Billboard 200
18	MC Eiht	Lessons	Blue Stamp Music, Year Round	
18	Problem	Coffee & Kush, Vol. 2	Diamond Lane Music Group, Rostrum Records	
18	Shy Glizzy	Young Jefe 3	300, Glizzy Gang	Debuted at No. 118 on the Billboard 200
18	Toosii	Poetic Pain	South Coast Music Group, UMG	Debuted at No. 17 on the Billboard 200
18	Wise Intelligent and Snowgoons	Omnicide	Goon Musick	
23	Mozzy	Occupational Hazard	Mozzy Music, Empire	Debuted at No. 190 on the Billboard 200
25	Action Bronson	Only for Dolphins	Loma Vista, Concord	
25	Arrested Development	Don't Fight Your Demons	Vagabond Productions	
25	A$AP Ferg	Floor Seats II	A$AP Worldwide, Polo Grounds Music, RCA Records	Debuted at No. 143 on the Billboard 200
25	Elzhi	Seven Times Down Eight Times Up	Fat Beats	
25	Fredo Bang	In the Name of Gee	Bang Biz, Def Jam	Debuted at No. 93 on the Billboard 200
25	Joji	Nectar	88Rising, 12Tone	Debuted at No. 3 on the Billboard 200
25	Machine Gun Kelly	Tickets to My Downfall	Bad Boy, Interscope	Debuted at No. 1 on the Billboard 200
25	MBNel	Child of the Trenches II	Muddy Boyz, Empire	
25	Nappy Roots	40RTY	Not Regular	
25	Public Enemy	What You Gonna Do When the Grid Goes Down?	Def Jam	
25	Spillage Village	Spilligion	Dreamville, Interscope, SinceThe80s	Debuted at No. 141 on the Billboard 200
25	Tory Lanez	Daystar	One Umbrella	Debuted at No. 10 on the Billboard 200

=== October ===
Day	Artist(s)	Album	Record label(s)	Entering chart position
2	21 Savage and Metro Boomin	Savage Mode II	Slaughter Gang, Boominati, Epic	Debuted at No. 1 on the Billboard 200
2	The Alchemist	A Doctor, Painter & an Alchemist Walk into a Bar	ALC Records	
2	Ben Kenobe	The Return of the Jedi	made by GOD	
2	Bryson Tiller	Anniversary	RCA	Debuted at No. 5 on the Billboard 200
2	Celly Cel	Focused	Realside	
2	Larry June and Harry Fraud	Keep Going	TFM, SRFSCHL	
2	Lilbootycall	23	Glow-Up, Warner	
2	Paul Wall	Subculture	Self-released	
2	Rockie Fresh	Slid Thru Just to Show You Whats Up	Self-released	
2	Rucci	Midget	Empire	
2	Sa-Roc	The Sharecropper's Daughter	Rhymesayers	
2	Smoke DZA	Homegrown	RFC, Cinematic	
2	Westside Gunn	Who Made the Sunshine	Griselda, Shady Records, Interscope	
2	Willie the Kid	Capital Gains	The Fly	
2	YG	My Life 4Hunnid	4Hunnid, Def Jam	Debuted at No. 4 on the Billboard 200
2	Yung Bleu	Love Scars: The 5 Stages of Emotions	Empire	
2	Yung Gravy	Gasanova	Republic	Debuted at No. 52 on the Billboard 200
6	Cassidy	Da Science	Mayhem Music	
9	BlocBoy JB	FatBoy	Foundation, Interscope	
9	D-Block Europe	The Blue Print: Us vs. Them	Self-released	Debuted at No. 2 on the UK Albums Chart
9	Famous Dex	Diana	Rich Forever Music, 300	
9	Headie One	Edna	Relentless	Debuted at No. 1 on the UK Albums Chart
9	Lil Loaded	A Demon in 6lue	Self-released	
9	Papoose	Endangered Species	Honorable Records, Empire Distribution	
9	Reason	New Beginnings	Top Dawg Entertainment	Debuted at No. 167 on the Billboard 200
9	Rittz	Picture Perfect	CNT	
9	Roc Nation	Reprise	Roc Nation	
16	Benny the Butcher	Burden of Proof	Griselda, Empire	Debuted at No. 29 on the Billboard 200
16	Black Thought	Streams of Thought, Vol. 3: Cane & Able	Republic	
16	Gucci Mane and the New 1017	So Icy Gang, Vol. 1	1017, Atlantic	Debuted at No. 46 on the Billboard 200
16	Homeboy Sandman	Don't Feed the Monster	Mello Music Group	
16	Jelly Roll	Self Medicated	War Dog	Debuted at No. 110 on the Billboard 200
16	Open Mike Eagle	Anime, Trauma and Divorce	Auto Reverse	
16	PartyNextDoor	Partypack	OVO, Warner	Debuted at No. 117 on the Billboard 200
16	Price	Clrd	Self-released	
16	ShooterGang Kony	Still Kony 2	Empire	
16	Serial Killers	Summer of Sam	Open Bar, Empire	
16	T.I.	The L.I.B.R.A.	Grand Hustle, Empire	Debuted at No. 18 on the Billboard 200
20	Chuck Strangers	Too Afraid to Dance	Sounds of Beverly	
20	Ras Kass	I'm Not Clearing Shit	Blackhouse	
21	Ghostemane	Anti-Icon	Blackmage Records	
21	Trapboy Freddy	Big Trap	300, Cool Money	
23	Beastie Boys	Beastie Boys Music	Capitol Records	Debuted at No. 64 on the Billboard 200
23	Blacc Zacc	803 Legend	South Coast, Interscope	
23	Clipping.	Visions of Bodies Being Burned	Sub Pop	
23	Comethazine	Bawskee 4	Alamo Records	Debuted at No. 177 on the Billboard 200
23	Dej Loaf	Sell Sole II	Yellow World, BMG	
23	Fat Tony	Exotica	Carpark	
23	Gorillaz	Song Machine, Season One: Strange Timez	Parlophone, Warner	
23	Kxng Crooked	Flag	Hitmaker Music Group	
23	Luh Kel	L.O.V.E.	Cinematic	
23	Joyner Lucas	Evolution	Twenty Nine Music Group	Debuted at No. 49 on the Billboard 200
23	Junglepussy	Jp4	Friends Of, Jagjaguwar	
23	Q Da Fool	Dope on a Spoon	Roc Nation	
23	Tech N9ne	Fear Exodus	Strange Music	
23	Ty Dolla $ign	Featuring Ty Dolla $ign	4Hunnid Records, Taylor Gang, Atlantic	Debuted at No. 4 on the Billboard 200
25	The Alchemist	The Food Villain	ALC	
29	Serengeti	With Greg From Deerhoof	Joyful Noise	
30	Atmosphere	The Day Before Halloween	Rhymesayers	
30	Bizarre and Wack Rac	All in My Head	Wack Rac	
30	Busta Rhymes	Extinction Level Event 2: The Wrath of God	Conglomerate, Empire	Debuted at No. 7 on the Billboard 200
30	Common	A Beautiful Revolution Pt. 1	Loma Vista, Concord	
30	B.o.B	Murd and Mercy	Bobby Ray Music	
30	Dizzee Rascal	E3 AF	Island	Debuted at No. 13 on the UK Albums Chart
30	Eric Bellinger	Eric B for President: Term 3	YFS, Empire	
30	Hoodrich Pablo Juan	Master Sensei 2	Empire	
30	Ill Bill	La Bella Medusa	Uncle Howie Records	
30	J.R. Writer	I Really Rap Too	Self-released	
30	King Von	Welcome to O'Block	Only the Family, Empire	Debuted at No. 13 on the Billboard 200
30	MadeinTYO	Never Forgotten	Privateclub, Commission	
30	M Huncho and Nafe Smallz	DNA	HunchOzone	Debuted at No. 6 on the UK Albums Chart
30	Omarion	The Kinection	Create	
30	Ray West and A.G.	Nyluv	HHV	
30	Small Bills (Elucid & The Lasso)	Don't Play It Straight	Mello	
30	$NOT	Beautiful Havoc	300	Debuted at No. 172 on the Billboard 200
30	Trippie Redd	Pegasus	TenThousand Projects	Debuted at No. 2 on the Billboard 200

=== November ===
Day	Artist(s)	Album	Record label(s)	Entering chart position
1	NLE Choppa	From Dark to Light	NLE Choppa Entertainment, Warner	Debuted at No. 115 on the Billboard 200
6	Doe Boy and Southside	Demons R Us	Epic, Freebandz	
6	Dutchavelli	Dutch from the 5th	2up2down, Parlophone	Debuted at No. 8 on the UK Albums Chart
6	Giggs	Now or Never	No BS Music, Island	Debuted at No. 15 on the UK Albums Chart
6	Guap Tarantino	Bandemic	Freebandz, Epic	
6	The Kid Laroi	F*ck Love (Savage)	Grade A Productions, Columbia	Debuted at No. 1 on the Billboard 200
6	King Gordy and Jimmy Donn	The House	Sicfux	
6	Nav	Emergency Tsunami	XO Records, Republic Records	Debuted at No. 6 on the Billboard 200
6	N.B.S. and Snowgoons	Still Trapped in America	Goon Musick	
6	Phora	With Love 2	Self-released	Debuted at No. 160 on the Billboard 200
6	Sosamann	Born to Drip	The Sauce Familia, Create	
6	Wrekonize	Pressure Point	Strange Music, ingrooves	
7	Bones	FromBeyondTheGrave	TeamSESH	
9	Gawne	Eternal	Self-released	
10	Salaam Remi	Black on Purpose	Louder Than Life	
11	Kodak Black	Bill Israel	Dollaz N Dealz, Sniper Gang, Atlantic	Debuted at No. 52 on the Billboard 200
11	YoungBoy Never Broke Again	Until I Return	Artist Partner Group, Never Broke Again, Atlantic	Debuted at No. 10 on the Billboard 200
13	2 Chainz	So Help Me God!	Def Jam	Debuted at No. 15 on the Billboard 200
13	Aesop Rock	Spirit World Field Guide	Rhymesayers	Debuted at No. 54 on the Billboard 200
13	Bari	F*@k It... Burn It All Down	Cinq	
13	Blac Youngsta	Fuck Everybody 3	Heavy Camp, Collective Music Group, Epic Records	Debuted at No. 143 on the Billboard 200
13	DaniLeigh	Movie	Def Jam	
13	DJ Kay Slay	Homage	Streetsweepers	
13	Future and Lil Uzi Vert	Pluto x Baby Pluto	Freebandz, Epic Records, Generation Now, Atlantic Records	Debuted at No. 2 on the Billboard 200
13	Father	Come Outside, We Not Gone Jump You	Awful Records	
13	Goodie Mob	Survival Kit	The Right Records	
13	K-Trap	Street Side Effects	Black Butter	Debuted at No. 26 on the UK Albums Chart
13	Lil Tracy	Designer Talk 2	Toreshi	
13	Onefour	Against All Odds	Onefour	Debuted at No. 7 on the ARIA Albums Chart
13	Pa Salieu	Send Them to Coventry	Warner Music UK	
13	Pink Siifu & Fly Anakin	FlySiifu's	Lex	
15	Billy Danze	WeBusy: #TheListeningSession	WeBusy	
16	Love Renaissance	Home for the Holidays	LVRN	
16	Roc Marciano	Mt. Marci	Art That Kills, Marci Enterprises	
17	Russ	Chomp	Russ My Way	
19	Glaive	Cypress Grove	Interscope	
20	DaBaby	My Brother's Keeper (Long Live G)	Interscope Records	Debuted at No. 40 on the Billboard 200
20	French Montana	CB5	Montana Entertainment, Empire Distribution	Debuted at No. 51 on the Billboard 200
20	Jeezy	The Recession 2	CTE World, Def Jam	Debuted at No. 19 on the Billboard 200
20	Lil Eazzyy	Underrated	Atlantic	
20	Loski	Music, Trial and Trauma: A Drill Story	Since '93	Debuted at No. 39 on the UK Albums Chart
20	Meek Mill	Quarantine Pack	Dreamchasers, Maybach Music Group, Atlantic	Debuted at No. 44 on the Billboard 200
20	Megan Thee Stallion	Good News	1501 Certified Entertainment, 300 Entertainment	Debuted at No. 2 on the Billboard 200
20	Rich the Kid and YoungBoy Never Broke Again	Nobody Safe	Rich Forever, Empire	Debuted at No. 43 on the Billboard 200
20	Robb Banks	Tha Leak	Working on Dying	
20	Saint Jhn	While the World Was Burning	GODD COMPLEXx, Hitco Music	Debuted at No. 34 on the Billboard 200
20	YSN Flow	Long Story Short	Republic	
27	AJ Tracey	Secure the Bag! 2	AJ Tracey	Debuted at No. 75 on the UK Albums Chart
27	Curren$y and Harry Fraud	Bonus Footage	SRFSCHL, Jet Life	
27	Jahari Massamba Unit (Madlib and Karriem Riggins)	Pardon My French	Madlib Invazion	
27	Juicy J	The Hustle Continues	Trippy Music, E1 Records	Debuted at No. 68 on the Billboard 200
27	Lil Wayne	No Ceilings 3 (A Side)	Young Money	
27	Lil Yachty	Lil Boat 3.5	Quality Control Music, Motown Records	
27	Rimzee	Upper Clapton Dream 2	Ricardo Miles Entertainment	Debuted at No. 96 on the UK Albums Chart
27	Rylo Rodriguez	G.I.H.F.	Four Pockets Full	Debuted at No. 37 on the Billboard 200
27	Statik Selektah	The Balancing Act	ShowOff, Mass Appeal	
27	Stunna 4 Vegas	Welcome to 4 Vegas	Billion Dollar Baby, Interscope	
27	Twiztid	Revelashen	Majik Ninja Entertainment	

=== December ===
Day	Artist(s)	Album	Record label(s)	Entering chart position
1	Craig Xen	Why	Duetti	
2	Andy Mineo	Happy Thoughts	Reach, Miner League	
4	Bernz	Sorry for the Mess	Strange Music, Ingrooves	
4	DJ Scheme	Family	Empire, Scheme Records	
4	Jet Life	Welcome to Jet Life Recordings	Jet Life	
4	Rico Nasty	Nightmare Vacation	Atlantic, Sugar Trap	
4	Quando Rondo	Before My Time Up	Self-released	
4	Rittz	Rittzmas	CNT	
4	Tisakorean	Wasteland	Ultra	
4	YFN Lucci	Wish Me Well 3	Think It's A Game, Warner Records	Debuted at No. 49 on the Billboard 200
4	Your Old Droog	Dump YOD: Krutoy Edition	Mongoloid Banks	
4	Yung Baby Tate	After the Rain	Self-released	
8	Cassidy	Da Formula	Mayhem Music	
8	Killah Priest & Jordan River Banks	The Third Eye in Technicolor	Proverbs, Riversound	
8	Yhung T.O.	Jupiter	RBE, Empire	
9	Balt Getty and Chino XL	Chino vs. Balt	Purplehaus Records	
11	Bia	For Certain	BIA, Epic Records	Debuted at No. 64 on the Billboard 200
11	Boldy James & Real Bad Man	Real Bad Boldy	Real Bad Man Records	
11	Fetty Wap	You Know the Vibes	300, RGF	
11	Hotboii	Double O Baby	Rebel, Geffen	
11	Jack Harlow	Thats What They All Say	Generation Now, Atlantic Records	Debuted at No. 5 on the Billboard 200
11	Jeremih & Chance the Rapper	Merry Christmas Lil Mama: The Gift That Keeps on Giving	Self-released	
11	Kamaiyah	No Explanations	Grnd.wrk, Empire	
11	Kid Cudi	Man on the Moon III: The Chosen	Wicked Awesome, Republic Records	Debuted at No. 2 on the Billboard 200
11	Lil Loaded	Criptape	Self-released	
11	Lndn Drgs	Burnout 4	GDF, Empire	
11	Pete Rock & The Soul Brothers	PeteStrumentals 3	Tru Soul	
11	PlayThatBoiZay	Girls Love Vampires	Self-released	
11	Terrace Martin	Village Days	Sounds of Crenshaw, Empire	
11	Young Scooter and Zaytoven	Zaystreet	BMG, Onerpm	
14	Xamã	Zodíaco	Bagua	
16	Sheff G	Proud of Me Now	Winners Circle, RCA	
18	Berner & Cozmo	Respect the Connect	Bern One Entertainment	
18	Eminem	Music to Be Murdered By - Side B (Deluxe Edition)	Shady, Aftermath, Interscope, Goliath	
18	Jackboy	Love Me While I'm Here	1804, Empire	
18	J.I the Prince of N.Y	Hood Life Krisis, Vol. 3	G*Starr, Geffen, Interscope	Debuted at No. 191 on the Billboard 200
18	Mike Posner	Operation: Wake Up	Monster Mountain	
18	Robb Banks	Tha Leak 2	Working On Dying	
18	Smoove'L	Ice Cups & Shoot Outs	Run, Interscope	
18	SpotemGottem	Final Destination	Self-released	Debuted at No. 194 on the Billboard 200
18	Too $hort & E-40	Ain't Gone Do It / Terms and Conditions	Trunk Productions, Heavy on the Grind, 3T, Empire	
20	Larry June	Numbers	The Freeminded	
21	KRS-One	Between da Protests	R.A.M.P Ent Agency	
22	Havoc & Flee Lord	In the Name of Prodigy	LordMobb	
22	Jay Critch	Signed With Love	Empire	
22	Tory Lanez	Loner	One Umbrella Records	
23	Chris Webby	28 Wednesdays Later	EightyHD	
23	J. Stone	The Definition of Pain	All Money In Records	
24	Lil' Flip	Flip Mayweather	GT Digital, Lil' Flip	
24	Lil Durk	The Voice	Alamo Records, Geffen Records	Debuted at No. 46 on the Billboard 200
25	Lil Wop	Enchanted	Self-released	
25	Playboi Carti	Whole Lotta Red	AWGE, Interscope Records	Debuted at No. 1 on the Billboard 200
25	Rubi Rose	For the Streets	Craft	
25	Tink	A Gift and a Curse	WD, Empire	
25	Troy Ave	White Christmas 8	BSB	
25	Tyga & DJ Drama	Well Done Fever	Last Kings, Gangsta Grillz	
25	Zaytoven	GrinchToven: Stole the Trap	Self-released	

== Highest-charting songs ==
=== United States ===
Hip-hop songs from any year which charted in the 2020 Top 40 of the Billboard Hot 100
Song	Artist	Project	Peak position
"Franchise"	Travis Scott featuring Young Thug and M.I.A.	—N/a	1
"Mood"	24kGoldn featuring Iann Dior	El Dorado	1
"Rockstar"	DaBaby featuring Roddy Ricch	Blame It on Baby	1
"Savage"	Megan Thee Stallion featuring Beyoncé	Suga	1
"Say So"	Doja Cat featuring Nicki Minaj	Hot Pink	1
"The Box"	Roddy Ricch	Please Excuse Me for Being Antisocial	1
"The Scotts"	The Scotts (Travis Scott and Kid Cudi)	—N/a	1
"Toosie Slide"	Drake	Dark Lane Demo Tapes	1
"Trollz"	6ix9ine and Nicki Minaj	TattleTales	1
"WAP"	Cardi B featuring Megan Thee Stallion	Am I the Drama?	1
"Come & Go"	Juice Wrld and Marshmello	Legends Never Die	2
"Laugh Now Cry Later"	Drake featuring Lil Durk	—N/a	2
"Life Is Good"	Future featuring Drake	High Off Life	2
"Whats Poppin"	Jack Harlow featuring DaBaby, Tory Lanez and Lil Wayne	Thats What They All Say	2
"Godzilla"	Eminem featuring Juice Wrld	Music to Be Murdered By	3
"Gooba"	6ix9ine	TattleTales	3
"Popstar"	DJ Khaled featuring Drake	Khaled Khaled	3
"The Bigger Picture"	Lil Baby	My Turn	3
"Wishing Well"	Juice Wrld	Legends Never Die	5
"Baby Pluto"	Lil Uzi Vert	Eternal Atake	6
"For the Night"	Pop Smoke featuring Lil Baby and DaBaby	Shoot for the Stars, Aim for the Moon	6
"Lemonade"	Internet Money and Gunna featuring Don Toliver and Nav	B4 the Storm	6
"Conversations"	Juice Wrld	Legends Never Die	7
"Pain 1993"	Drake featuring Playboi Carti	Dark Lane Demo Tapes	7
"Blueberry Faygo"	Lil Mosey	Certified Hitmaker	8
"Greece"	DJ Khaled featuring Drake	Khaled Khaled	8
"Lo Mein"	Lil Uzi Vert	Eternal Atake	8
"Smile"	Juice Wrld and the Weeknd	Legends Never Die	8
"Life's a Mess"	Juice Wrld and Halsey	Legends Never Die	9
"Runnin"	21 Savage and Metro Boomin	Savage Mode II	9
"Silly Watch"	Lil Uzi Vert	Eternal Atake	9
"What You Know Bout Love"	Pop Smoke	Shoot for the Stars, Aim for the Moon	9
"Hate the Other Side"	Juice Wrld and Marshmello featuring Polo G and the Kid Laroi	Legends Never Die	10
"Mr. Right Now"	21 Savage and Metro Boomin featuring Drake	Savage Mode II	10
"We Paid"	Lil Baby and 42 Dugg	My Turn	10
"Ballin'"	Mustard featuring Roddy Ricch	Perfect Ten	11
"Hot Girl Bummer"	Blackbear	Everything Means Nothing	11
"P2"	Lil Uzi Vert	Eternal Atake	11
"Righteous"	Juice Wrld	Legends Never Die	11
"The Woo"	Pop Smoke featuring 50 Cent and Roddy Ricch	Shoot for the Stars, Aim for the Moon	11
"Blood on My Jeans"	Juice Wrld	Legends Never Die	12
"Body"	Megan Thee Stallion	Good News	12
"Rags2Riches"	Rod Wave featuring ATR Son Son	Pray 4 Love	12
"Myron"	Lil Uzi Vert	Lil Uzi Vert vs. the World 2	13
"Chicago Freestyle"	Drake featuring Giveon	Dark Lane Demo Tapes	14
"Titanic"	Juice Wrld	Legends Never Die	14
"Woah"	Lil Baby	My Turn	15
"Bad Energy"	Juice Wrld	Legends Never Die	16
"Sum 2 Prove"	Lil Baby	My Turn	16
"Falling"	Trevor Daniel	Nicotine	17
"Good News"	Mac Miller	Circles	17
"Jump"	DaBaby featuring YoungBoy Never Broke Again	Blame It on Baby	17
"Mood Swings"	Pop Smoke featuring Lil Tjay	Shoot for the Stars, Aim for the Moon	17
"Said Sum"	Moneybagg Yo	Code Red	17
"Turks"	Nav and Gunna featuring Travis Scott	Good Intentions	17
"Heatin Up"	Lil Baby and Gunna	My Turn	18
"Bean (Kobe)"	Lil Uzi Vert featuring Chief Keef	Lil Uzi Vert vs. the World 2	19
"D4L"	Future, Drake and Young Thug	Dark Lane Demo Tapes	19
"Glock in My Lap"	21 Savage and Metro Boomin	Savage Mode II	19
"Move Ya Hips"	ASAP Ferg featuring Nicki Minaj and MadeinTYO	Floor Seats II	19
"High Fashion"	Roddy Ricch featuring Mustard	Please Excuse Me for Being Antisocial	20
"Suicidal"	YNW Melly featuring Juice Wrld	Melly vs. Melvin	20
"Tap In"	Saweetie	Pretty Bitch Music	20
"That Way"	Lil Uzi Vert	Eternal Atake	20
"Party Girl"	StaySolidRocky	Fallin'	21
"Dior"	Pop Smoke	Meet the Woo 2	22
"Find My Way"	DaBaby	Blame It on Baby	22
"Homecoming"	Lil Uzi Vert	Eternal Atake	22
"The Adventures of Moon Man & Slim Shady"	Kid Cudi and Eminem	—N/a	22
"Commercial"	Lil Baby featuring Lil Uzi Vert	My Turn	23
"Death Bed (Coffee for Your Head)"	Powfu featuring Beabadoobee	Poems of the Past	23
"Numbers"	A Boogie wit da Hoodie featuring Roddy Ricch, Gunna and London on da Track	Artist 2.0	23
"Yikes"	Nicki Minaj	—N/a	23
"Heart on Ice"	Rod Wave	PTSD	25
"Not You Too"	Drake featuring Chris Brown	Dark Lane Demo Tapes	25
"Prices"	Lil Uzi Vert	Eternal Atake	25
"Rich Nigga Shit"	21 Savage and Metro Boomin featuring Young Thug	Savage Mode II	26
"Ritmo (Bad Boys for Life)"	Black Eyed Peas and J Balvin	Translation	26
"Yessirskiii"	Lil Uzi Vert and 21 Savage	Lil Uzi Vert vs. the World 2	26
"Desires"	Drake featuring Future	Dark Lane Demo Tapes	27
"Darkness"	Eminem	Music to Be Murdered By	28
"Girls in the Hood"	Megan Thee Stallion	Good News	28
"Lil Top"	YoungBoy Never Broke Again	Still Flexin, Still Steppin	28
"Live Off My Closet"	Lil Baby featuring Future	My Turn	28
"Pop"	Lil Uzi Vert	Eternal Atake	28
"Don't Stop"	Megan Thee Stallion featuring Young Thug	Good News	30
"Flex"	Polo G featuring Juice Wrld	The Goat	30
"Time Flies"	Drake	Dark Lane Demo Tapes	30
"B.I.T.C.H."	Megan Thee Stallion	Suga	31
"Drankin n Smokin"	Future and Lil Uzi Vert	Pluto x Baby Pluto	31
"Emotionally Scarred"	Lil Baby	My Turn	31
"Got It on Me"	Pop Smoke	Shoot for the Stars, Aim for the Moon	31
"Those Kinda Nights"	Eminem featuring Ed Sheeran	Music to Be Murdered By	31
"Deep Pockets"	Drake	Dark Lane Demo Tapes	32
"Slidin"	21 Savage and Metro Boomin	Savage Mode II	32
"Solitaires"	Future featuring Travis Scott	High Off Life	32
"Bigger Than Life"	Lil Uzi Vert	Eternal Atake	33
"I Do It"	Lil Wayne featuring Big Sean and Lil Baby	Funeral	33
"Many Men"	21 Savage and Metro Boomin	Savage Mode II	33
"Aim for the Moon"	Pop Smoke featuring Quavo	Shoot for the Stars, Aim for the Moon	34
"Celebration Station"	Lil Uzi Vert	Eternal Atake	34
"Demons"	Drake featuring Fivio Foreign and Sosa Geek	Dark Lane Demo Tapes	34
"Stay High"	Juice Wrld	Legends Never Die	34
"Trillionaire"	Future featuring YoungBoy Never Broke Again	High Off Life	34
"Tyler Herro"	Jack Harlow	Thats What They All Say	34
"@ Meh"	Playboi Carti	—N/a	35
"Fighting Demons"	Juice Wrld	Legends Never Die	35
"My Window"	YoungBoy Never Broke Again featuring Lil Wayne	Top	35
"What That Speed Bout!?"	Mike Will Made It, Nicki Minaj and YoungBoy Never Broke Again	Michael	35
"When to Say When"	Drake	Dark Lane Demo Tapes	35
"Whole Lotta Choppas"	Sada Baby featuring Nicki Minaj	—N/a	35
"Unaccommodating"	Eminem featuring Young M.A	Music to Be Murdered By	36
"You Better Move"	Lil Uzi Vert	Eternal Atake	36
"Gangstas"	Pop Smoke	Shoot for the Stars, Aim for the Moon	37
"Holiday"	Lil Nas X	—N/a	37
"I'm Sorry"	Lil Uzi Vert	Eternal Atake	37
"Blue World"	Mac Miller	Circles	38
"Dollaz on My Head"	Gunna featuring Young Thug	Wunna	38
"Out West"	JackBoys and Travis Scott featuring Young Thug	JackBoys	38
"PTSD"	G Herbo featuring Juice Wrld, Lil Uzi Vert and Chance the Rapper	PTSD	38
"Tell Me U Luv Me"	Juice Wrld and Trippie Redd	Legends Never Die	38
"Walk Em Down"	NLE Choppa featuring Roddy Ricch	Top Shotta	38
"44 Bulldog"	Pop Smoke	Shoot for the Stars, Aim for the Moon	39
"Landed"	Drake	Dark Lane Demo Tapes	39
"Venetia"	Lil Uzi Vert	Eternal Atake	39

=== United Kingdom ===
Hip-hop songs from any year which charted in the 2020 Top 10 of the UK Singles Chart
Song	Artist	Project	Peak position
"Ain't It Different"	Headie One featuring Stormzy and AJ Tracey	Edna	2
"Rain"	Aitch and AJ Tracey	Polaris	3
"Really Love"	KSI featuring Craig David and Digital Farm Animals	All Over the Place	3
"Rover"	S1mba featuring DTG	Good Time Long Time	3
"See Nobody"	Wes Nelson featuring Hardy Caprio	—N/a	3
"Dinner Guest"	AJ Tracey featuring MoStack	Flu Game	5
"West Ten"	AJ Tracey featuring Mabel	Flu Game	5
"Only You Freestyle"	Headie One and Drake	Edna	5
"Houdini"	KSI featuring Swarmz and Tion Wayne	Dissimulation	6
"I Dunno"	Tion Wayne featuring Dutchavelli and Stormzy	—N/a	7
"Ei8ht Mile"	DigDat featuring Aitch	Ei8ht Mile	9

== Highest first-week consumption ==
List of albums with the highest first-week consumption (sales + streaming + track equivalent), as of December 2020 in the United States
Number	Album	Artist	1st-week consumption	1st-week position	Refs
1	Legends Never Die	Juice Wrld	497,000	1	
2	Eternal Atake	Lil Uzi Vert	288,000	1	
3	Music to Be Murdered By	Eminem	279,000	1	
4	Shoot for the Stars, Aim for the Moon	Pop Smoke	251,000	1	
5	Pink Friday 2	Nicki Minaj	228,000	2	
6	No Pressure	Logic	221,000	2	
7	My Turn	Lil Baby	197,000	1	
8	Savage Mode II	21 Savage and Metro Boomin	171,000	1	
9	Circles	Mac Miller	164,000	3	
10	JackBoys	JackBoys and Travis Scott	154,000	1	

== All critically reviewed albums ranked ==
=== Metacritic ===
Number	Artist	Album	Average score	Number of reviews	Reference
1	Pa Salieu	Send Them to Coventry	90	8 reviews	
2	Run the Jewels	RTJ4	89	26 reviews	
3	Freddie Gibbs x The Alchemist	Alfredo	88	9 reviews	
4	Headie One	Edna	87	7 reviews	
5	J Hus	Big Conspiracy	86	10 reviews	
6	Megan Thee Stallion	Good News	85	14 reviews	
7	Ka	Descendants of Cain	85	4 reviews	
8	Lil Uzi Vert	Eternal Atake	84	9 reviews	
9	Childish Gambino	3.15.20	83	16 reviews	
10	Mac Miller	Circles	83	14 reviews	
11	Jay Electronica	A Written Testimony	83	11 reviews	
12	Polo G	The Goat	83	5 reviews	
13	BTS	Map of the Soul: 7	82	12 reviews	
14	Conway The Machine	From King to a God	82	8 reviews	
15	Open Mike Eagle	Anime, Trauma and Divorce	82	7 reviews	
16	Benny The Butcher	Burden of Proof	82	6 reviews	
17	Skepta x Chip x Young Adz	Insomnia	82	6 reviews	
18	Dave East	Karma 3	82	4 reviews	
19	Jadakiss	Ignatius	82	4 reviews	
20	Gorillaz	Song Machine, Season One: Strange Timez	81	15 reviews	
21	21 Savage & Metro Boomin	Savage Mode II	81	10 reviews	
22	Denzel Curry & Kenny Beats	Unlocked	81	9 reviews	
23	Duckwrth	SuperGood	81	4 reviews	
24	Rico Nasty	Nightmare Vacation	80	12 reviews	
25	070 Shake	Modus Vivendi	80	10 reviews	
26	Knxwledge	1988	80	5 reviews	
27	Clipping	Visions of Bodies Being Burned	79	14 reviews	
28	Dizzee Rascal	E3 AF	79	10 reviews	
29	Royce da 5'9"	The Allegory	79	7 reviews	
30	Ty Dolla $ign	Featuring Ty Dolla Sign	79	7 reviews	
31	Wiley	The Godfather 3	79	7 reviews	
32	Little Simz	Drop 6	79	6 reviews	
33	Tory Lanez	The New Toronto 3	79	4 reviews	
34	Logic	No Pressure	78	5 reviews	
35	Mick Jenkins	The Circus	78	5 reviews	
36	Shabazz Palaces	The Don of Diamond Dreams	77	14 reviews	
37	Megan Thee Stallion	Suga	77	9 reviews	
38	Loski	Music, Trial and Trauma: A Drill Story	77	4 reviews	
39	Mozzy	Beyond Bulletproof	77	4 reviews	
40	Naeem	Startisha	76	8 reviews	
41	Westside Gunn	Who Made the Sunshine	76	5 reviews	
42	Public Enemy	What You Gonna Do When the Grid Goes Down?	75	13 reviews	
43	Juice WRLD	Legends Never Die	75	10 reviews	
44	Aminé	Limbo	75	7 reviews	
45	Playboi Carti	Whole Lotta Red	75	7 reviews	
46	Princess Nokia	Everything Is Beautiful	75	6 reviews	
47	Pop Smoke	Meet the Woo 2	75	5 reviews	
48	Princess Nokia	Everything Sucks	74	6 reviews	
49	Black Thought	Streams of Thought, Vol. 3: Cane & Able	74	5 reviews	
50	The Streets	None of Us Are Getting Out of This Life Alive	73	15 reviews	
51	Action Bronson	Only for Dolphins	73	4 reviews	
52	Nas	King's Disease	72	9 reviews	
53	Dej Loaf	Sell Sole II	72	4 reviews	
54	Kid Cudi	Man on the Moon III: The Chosen	71	10 reviews	
55	Big Sean	Detroit 2	71	8 reviews	
56	Busta Rhymes	Extinction Level Event 2: The Wrath of God	71	6 reviews	
57	Pop Smoke	Shoot for the Stars, Aim for the Moon	70	13 reviews	
58	Future	High Off Life	70	9 reviews	
59	Pink Siifu & Fly Anakin	FlySiifu's	70	5 reviews	
60	T.I.	The L.I.B.R.A.	70	4 reviews	
61	Haleek Maul	Errol	68	5 reviews	
62	2 Chainz	So Help Me God!	68	4 reviews	
63	Gunna	Wunna	67	6 reviews	
64	Future x Lil Uzi Vert	Pluto × Baby Pluto	67	5 reviews	
65	Paul Epworth	Voyager	67	4 reviews	
66	Lil Baby	My Turn	66	5 reviews	
67	Eminem	Music to Be Murdered By	64	17 reviews	
68	Black Eyed Peas	Translation	63	4 reviews	
69	Lil Wayne	Funeral	62	10 reviews	
70	DaBaby	Blame It on Baby	62	9 reviews	
71	Drake	Dark Lane Demo Tapes	61	10 reviews	
72	Lil Yachty	Lil Boat 3	59	4 reviews	
73	NAV	Good Intentions	54	4 reviews	

=== AnyDecentMusic? ===
Number	Artist	Album	Average score	Number of reviews	Reference
1	Run the Jewels	RTJ4	8.8	27 reviews	
2	Open Mike Eagle	Anime, Trauma and Divorce	8.2	7 reviews	
3	Megan Thee Stallion	Good News	8.1	14 reviews	
4	J Hus	Big Conspiracy	8.1	11 reviews	
5	Childish Gambino	3.15.20	7.9	16 reviews	

== See also ==
- Previous article: 2019 in hip-hop
- Next article: 2021 in hip-hop
