= Talk to Me (Drakeo the Ruler song) =

Single by Drakeo the Ruler featuring Drake

Single by Drakeo the Ruler featuring Drake

from the album The Truth Hurts
- Released: February 23, 2021
- Genre: West Coast hip hop; R&B
- Length: 3:47
- Label: Stinc Team
- Songwriters: Darrell Caldwell; Aubrey Graham
- Producers: EY; Elias Knight; Jordanwtf

Drakeo the Ruler singles chronology
"Long Live the Greatest" (2021)	"Talk to Me" (2021)	"Dream Team" (2021)

Drake singles chronology
"Outta Time" (2020)	"Talk to Me" (2021)	"What's Next" (2021)

"Talk to Me" is a song by American rapper Drakeo the Ruler featuring Canadian rapper Drake. It was released on February 23, 2021, as the lead single from the former's ninth mixtape The Truth Hurts (2021). The song was produced by EY and Elias Knight.

== Background ==
Drakeo the Ruler teased the song in December 2020, shortly after his release from jail. In an interview with Zane Lowe, Drakeo the Ruler stated that during his wrongful incarceration, Drake had already finished his part of the song:

When I was in jail, I was supposed to do something already. Everybody was telling me, but I had got my privileges taken. They was telling me he had something for me, but I'm like, "Whatever, bro." I got out of jail and my engineer was like, "Why you don't follow Drake?" I'm like, "He don't follow me, bro." Then I looked, and I'm like, "Oh yeah." So I hit him up, I'm like, "Let's do something." And then he's like, "What's your number? I got this song I did for you." And then it kind of clicked in my head what they was talking about before. I'm like, "Dang." At first, I was like, "That's kind of different, but I'm like, nah. This Drake. I'm finna do whatever." But at first, I'm like I don't usually really do something like that. But then when I got on it, I'm like, "Oh yeah, this hard." I'm just like "Drake bro!" Like all right.

== Composition and lyrics ==
"Talk to Me" is a hip hop song with an R&B-style chorus and "smoothed-out" production. Chris DeVille of Stereogum wrote about the song, "Drake is in swaggering pop mode, while Drakeo stays in the cut muttering hard street talk as usual." The song opens with Drake singing about his infatuation in the chorus, "I don't know if what we have is love, but it's on my mind / We might slide on a nigga inside this club, girl, close your eyes / Fifteen brothers, no friends when I pull up, for peace of mind / Lights come on, I'ma need you to come find me, don't be so shy". Drakeo the Ruler raps two verses using a "West Coast gangster appeal" ("Don't be shy, I got killers with me, stupid / I march with sticks, I ain't worried bout no groupies"), with "lovesick bars". He raps about his time in jail as well.

== Critical reception ==
"Fnr Tigg" of Complex wrote that for the track, "Drakeo the Ruler decided to highlight his versatility by venturing into Drizzy's world to make a street ballad." Jeff Ihaza of Rolling Stone described Drake as "slotting seamlessly onto the track's moody interpretation of West Coast rap's springy production."

== Charts ==
Chart performance for "Talk to Me"
Chart (2021)	Peak position
Canada (Canadian Hot 100)	85
US Bubbling Under Hot 100 Singles	8
US Hot R&B/Hip-Hop Songs	43
