= Rxseboy =

American lo-fi hip hop rapper (born 1999)

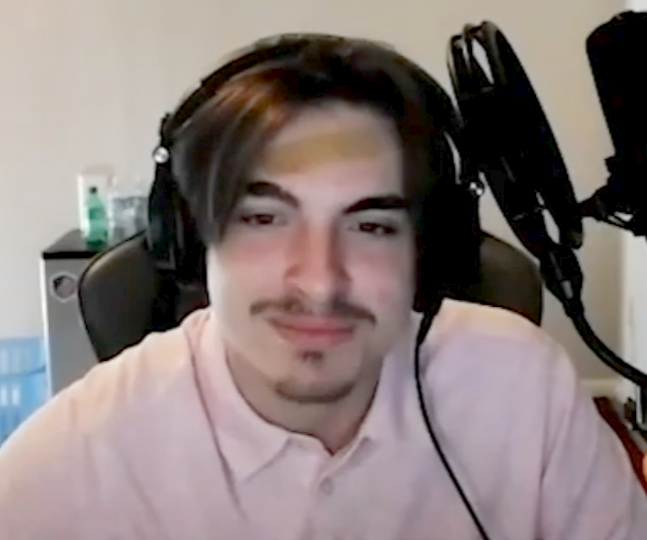
- Rxseboy in a 2020 interview

Background information
- Also known as: Sorrow; Akumuh; Anthill
- Born: Anthony Shane Tubbs; December 19, 1999 (age 26); Warwick, New York, U.S.
- Origin: Florida, U.S.
- Genres: Hip hop; lo-fi
- Occupations: Rapper; producer
- Years active: 2010–present

Anthony Shane Tubbs (born December 19, 1999), known by his stage name Rxseboy (pronounced "Roseboy"), is an American lo-fi hip hop rapper based in Florida. He is best known for collaborating with Powfu and Sarcastic Sounds on singles such as "The Way That You See Me" (feat. Rxseboy, Sarcastic Sounds, and Ayleen Valentine), "Eyes Blue Like The Atlantic, Pt. 2" (feat. Powfu, Alec Benjamin and Rxseboy), and "I'll Come Back to You" (feat. Sarcastic Sounds and Rxseboy), along with his own songs "When We Were 16" and "Memory" (feat. SadBoyProlific).

== Early life and career beginnings ==
In 2017, Tubbs had been broken up with by a girl he was dating at the time. In retaliation, he decided to make a song about it and posted a snippet of it on Instagram. After doing this, most of the school would see the snippet and turn on the girl that had broken up with him. After finishing his junior year of high school, he released his first project, Daydreams. The next year he released his first mixtape, Balance, which was his first lo-fi related project. Balance featured his single "Thrive", which is one of his most popular songs to date.

In 2021, Tubbs would release the song "Somewhere Else", with fellow rapper "Ozee". Ozee was a close friend of Tubbs, and died shortly after the song's completion. Rxse released the song out of respect for Austin, stating this in the song's description: "rest easy king. austin was one of the best friends i've ever had. he had such a bright future in music and i'm extremely happy that we got this song done before he passed. love you bro."

== Career ==
Tubbs first began releasing music on SoundCloud under his birth name, Anthony Tubbs, but decided to change it as it was "pretty lame" and because he wanted to change it to something with the word rose in it as he likes flowers. He initially went with "Rosegold" but settled on "Roseboy" and swapped out the first "o" with an "x", thus creating "Rxseboy".

Rxseboy released his debut single, "Greatest", in December 2017.

Through 2018, he would continue to release several EPs such as Autumn and Atmosphere.

In 2019, he would release several mixtapes. The first of these would be My Mind, having 8 tracks and releasing on March 25. The second of these would be Enjoy The Moment, also with 8 tracks releasing on May 31. The last of these mixtapes was A Catalog of Cool Songs, having 7 tracks and releasing on August 31. These releases made 2019 one of Rxse's most prolific years.

On November 20, 2020, Tubbs was featured in a single by Powfu, "When the Hospital Was My Home".

On June 16, 2021, an Instagram Stories game, "Spilled My Coffee", featured a song that artist Snøw made with Rxseboy and Jack Cullen.

On December 21, 2021, he released a new single, "Leaving".

On December 3, 2022, he was featured on Powfu's single "Shade of Blue" (feat. Rxseboy, Tia Tia, and Shalfi).

After half a year of almost no singles as Rxseboy (during this time, he was releasing several singles and mixtapes under the alias Sorrow), Tubbs would release the seventh installment of his "End Of The Year" series, "End Of The Year V7" on December 23, 2022.

In 2023, Tubbs transitioned from mainly lo-fi music to pop music, most notably seen in his third single of 2023, "Weird!". 2023 would prove to be a prolific year for Tubbs, releasing several singles as well as featuring on several singles such as "Harvey Dent" by PmBata.

After a year of no new mixtapes or EPs as Rxseboy, on June 30 Tubbs would release Blood. This was his first mixtape as Rxseboy in over a year. As well as Bloom, he would release a collaborative mixtape with Drex Carter, The Greatest Story Never Told. The mixtape was released September 29, 2023.

In January 2024, Tubbs released the single "Talking To Myself". The song was released as a single from his sixth mixtape, Love Is a Drug. The song had a more R&B/soft grunge sound, indicating a new era of sound from him. The single "Dramatic" was also released as a single from Love Is a Drug. The mixtape was released on May 24, 2024.

== Other projects ==
Despite Rxseboy being his main recording alias, Tubbs has two other known aliases he records music under.

=== Sorrow ===
The most prolific of these other two aliases is "Sorrow". This persona has been used by Rxseboy as far back as 2020. This persona is used for his more sad, soft songs. Under this alias, Tubbs has released two EPs and three mixtapes, the most notable of which being Sad Songs I Wrote at 3AM, as it features the single "Not Alright". Tubbs also uses the Sorrow alias to release songs that go unreleased as Rxseboy.

=== Akumuh ===
The other of the two aliases is "Akumuh". As Akumuh, Tubbs makes more alternative rap songs. This alias had not been used much until May 10, 2024, when Tubbs would release an eponymous mixtape under the alias, with seven tracks. This mixtape was released as a precursor to his sixth mixtape as Rxseboy, Love Is a Drug.
