= Drakeo the Ruler =

American rapper (1993–2021)

- Drakeo the Ruler on September 28, 2021.

Background information
- Also known as: Big Bank Budda; Mr Everything; Mr. Mosely; Mr. Pops On My Knots
- Born: Darrell Wayne Caldwell Jr. December 1, 1993; Los Angeles, California, U.S.
- Died: December 19, 2021 (aged 28) Los Angeles, California, U.S.
- Cause of death: Murder (stab wound to the neck)
- Genres: West Coast hip hop; gangsta rap; nervous music
- Occupations: Rapper; singer; songwriter
- Years active: 2013–2021
- Labels: EMPIRE; Stinc Team
- Formerly of: Stinc Team
- Children: 1

Darrell Wayne Caldwell Jr. (December 1, 1993 – December 19, 2021), known professionally as Drakeo the Ruler (/ˈdreɪk.oʊ/), was an American rapper from Los Angeles, California. He became known for his rapping flow, as well as his "oddly expressive, poetic word-choices", leading the Los Angeles Times to call him "the most original West Coast stylist in decades". His 2021 single, "Talk to Me" (featuring Drake) entered the Bubbling Under Hot 100 chart and preceded his debut studio album, The Truth Hurts (2021).

== Early life ==
Caldwell was born and raised in South Central Los Angeles, California, by a single mother. He attended Washington High School in nearby Westmont.

== Music career ==
After recording a handful of mixtapes with much more of a trap influence than West Coast hip hop he became known for, he was discovered by DJ Mustard, who remixed his song "Mr. Get Dough". The song premiered on WorldStarHipHop on April 14, 2015, and would become his breakout song, and has amassed over 8.6 million YouTube views as of August 2026. Six months later, in October, Drakeo released his official debut mixtape, I Am Mr. Mosely, as his first project under DJ Mustard's 10 Summers label.

He released his second project, I Am Mr. Mosely 2, on July 21, 2016, with features including Mozzy, Skeme, and Philthy Rich. He followed this up with the release of So Cold I Do Em in December.

After his jail release in November 2017, he recorded a 16-track mixtape, Cold Devil, in 10 days, and released it the following month. Paul A. Thompson of Pitchfork described it as "the most compelling album of the Los Angeles emcee's career", adding that his "avant deadpan and impressionistic relationship to the beat" is "icy and unforgettable". Similarly, Grant Rindner of Complex called it "one of the most impressive California rap projects in years". He released music videos for "Flu Flamming", "Big Banc Uchies", and "Out the Slums" within a month. "Flu Flamming" was also notably remixed by Lil Yachty, and "Big Banc Uchies" by Shy Glizzy. The music video for "Roll Bounce" was released in September, with Drakeo in jail awaiting trial.

The project, Thank You for Using GTL, was recorded from phone calls from jail, and released in June 2020. His official album debut, The Truth Hurts, was released on February 24, 2021. The album contains notable guest appearances from Don Toliver on the song "Dawn Tolliver" and Drake on the song "Talk to Me". The project also had features from Michigan rappers IceWear Vezzo, Snap Dogg, Krispylife Kidd, Canadian rapper Pressa, and California rapper Bravo the Bagchaser, accompanied by his Stinc Team labelmates Ketchy the Great, SaySoTheMac, and Drakeo's blood brother, Ralfy the Plug.

== Personal life ==
Caldwell had one child, a son.

== Legal issues ==
In January 2017, Caldwell was arrested by the LAPD when they raided a condo where he regularly shot music videos. He was subsequently held at Men's Central Jail after being charged with unlawful possession of a firearm by a felon. He was released in November.

In March 2018, he was arrested again, this time charged with first-degree murder, attempted murder and conspiracy to commit murder. The charges stemmed from a December 2016 shooting in Carson, California, where one person was killed and two were injured. He was facing life in prison. Simultaneously, members of his Stinc Team collective, including his brother Ralfy the Plug, were arrested in San Francisco on a variety of charges.

On July 25, 2019, he was acquitted of his murder and attempted murder charges in a Compton courthouse. However, the district attorney decided to refile charges of criminal gang conspiracy and shooting from a motor vehicle in August, two counts that resulted in a hung jury during his initial trial. His trial date was set for August 3, 2020. While incarcerated, he recorded Thank You for Using GTL, which Pitchfork called "likely the greatest rap album ever recorded from jail". He was released from jail in November 2020 following three years of incarceration after he accepted a deal from the District Attorney's office in which he pled guilty to shooting from a vehicle.

== Death ==
Caldwell was stabbed backstage at around 8:30 p.m. on December 18, 2021, during the Once Upon a Time in LA festival. Initial eyewitness accounts reported that he was stabbed in the neck during an altercation; later, his mother Darrylene Corniel revealed in an interview with Rolling Stone that Caldwell, his brother, and their entourage were attacked by "around 40, 60 men" in masks around the time of YG's arrival to the venue, and that Caldwell had been stabbed in the neck. Paramedics arrived at the scene at around 8:40 p.m. and transported Caldwell to a nearby hospital in critical condition. Snoop Dogg, who was co-headlining along with 50 Cent, YG, and Ice Cube, cancelled their performance once they were made aware of the situation. The event itself was cancelled shortly afterward.

Caldwell was pronounced dead as a result of his stab wounds on December 19, 2021. As of December 21, 2021, the Los Angeles Police Department continues to investigate his death as a homicide. He was interred at Forest Lawn Memorial Park in Hollywood Hills.

=== Aftermath and reactions ===
Following the news of his death, Corniel stated she would be suing Live Nation in regard to Caldwell's murder, citing negligence from the venue and lax security measures from the staff. In January 2023, a Los Angeles County Superior Court judge denied a motion by Live Nation to dismiss the lawsuit, allowing it to move forward.

Snoop Dogg posted a lengthy message on Instagram expressing his condolences to Caldwell's family, and that he had been in his dressing room preparing to perform when he was informed of the incident. He closed the statement with "I'm praying for peace in hip hop." Wiz Khalifa also called for peace in the music industry following the violent deaths of Caldwell and rapper Young Dolph.

== Discography ==
=== Studio albums ===
Title	Album details
The Truth Hurts	Released: February 24, 2021; Label: Stinc Team; Format: Digital download, streaming
Keep the Truth Alive	Released: September 30, 2022; Label: Stinc Team; Format: Digital download, streaming
The Undisputed Truth	Released: December 1, 2024; Label: Stinc Team; Format: Digital download, streaming

=== EPs ===
Title	EP details
Out of Character (with Pettypetty)	Released: February 15, 2021; Label: Get Money Genre, Stinc Team; Format: Digital download, streaming

=== Mixtapes ===
Title	Mixtape details
I Am Mr. Mosely	Released: October 2015; Label: Self-released; Format: Digital download, streaming
I Am Mr. Mosely 2	Released: July 2016; Label: Stinc Team; Format: Digital download, streaming
So Cold I Do Em	Released: December 2016; Label: Stinc Team; Format: Digital download, streaming
Cold Devil	Released: December 2017; Label: Stinc Team; Format: Digital download, streaming
Free Drakeo	Released: March 2020; Label: Self-released; Format: Digital download, streaming
Thank You for Using GTL (with JoogSZN)	Released: June 2020; Label: Stinc Team; Format: Digital download, streaming
We Know the Truth	Released: December 1, 2020; Label: Stinc Team; Format: Digital download, streaming
Because Y'all Asked	Released: December 29, 2020; Label: EMPIRE; Format: Digital download, streaming
A Cold Day In Hell (with Ralfy the Plug)	Released: April 19, 2021; Label: Stinc Team; Format: Digital download, streaming
Ain't That the Truth	Released: July 16, 2021; Label: Stinc Team; Format: Digital download, streaming
So Cold I Do Em 2	Released: December 7, 2021; Label: Stinc Team; Format: Digital download, streaming

=== Singles ===
Title	Year	Peak chart positions			Album
Title	Year	US Bub.	US R&B/HH	CAN	Album
"Closer To My Dreams Freestyle"	2016	-	-	-	Non-album single
"Big Banc Uchies"	2017	-	-	-	Cold Devil
"Flu Flamming"	2017	-	-	-	Cold Devil
"Out The Slums" (featuring 03 Greedo)	2017	-	-	-	Cold Devil
"Roll Bounce"	2017	-	-	-	Cold Devil
"For Real" (featuring OhGeesy & Ketchy The Great)	2020	-	-	-	We Know The Truth
"We Know The Truth" (featuring IceWear Vezzo & ALLBLACK)	2020	-	-	-	We Know The Truth
"20 Pieces"	2020	-	-	-	We Know The Truth
"Too Famous"	2020	-	-	-	We Know The Truth
"Fights Don't Matter"	2020	-	-	-	We Know The Truth
"Lil Boosie" (featuring $tupid Young)	2020	-	-	-	We Know The Truth
"In My Rear" (featuring DaBoii)	2020	-	-	-	We Know The Truth
"Captions"	2020	-	-	-	We Know The Truth
"Friday"	2020	-	-	-	We Know The Truth
"Polar Bear"	2020	-	-	-	We Know The Truth
"Mardi Gras"	2020	-	-	-	We Know The Truth
"Backflip or Sumn"	2020	-	-	-	Because Yall Asked
"GTA VI"	2020	-	-	-	Because Yall Asked
"Too Icey"	2021	-	-	-	The Truth Hurts
"It's Sum Shit On Me"	2021	-	-	-	The Truth Hurts
"RIP Deebo"	2021	-	-	-	The Truth Hurts
"Pow Right In The Kisser" (featuring Remble, Moneymonk, Ralfy the Plug & Ketchy the Great)	2021	-	-	-	The Truth Hurts
"10"	2021	-	-	-	The Truth Hurts
"Exclusive"	2021	-	-	-	The Truth Hurts
"Talk to Me" (featuring Drake)	2021	8	43	85	The Truth Hurts
"Flu Flam A Opp" (featuring Ralfy the Plug)	2021	-	-	-	Ain't That The Truth
"Wok and Red"	2021	-	-	-	Ain't That The Truth
"Black Buttons"	2021	-	-	-	Ain't That The Truth
"Cookie Pack" (featuring Ralfy the Plug)	2021	-	-	-	Ain't That The Truth
"Ain't That The Truth" (featuring Ralfy the Plug)	2021	-	-	-	Ain't That The Truth
"Out On Bail Freestyle"	2021	-	-	-	Non-album single
"IngleWeird"	2021	-	-	-	Non-album single
"300 Raccs"	2021	-	-	-	So Cold I Do Em 2
"Stincs Run La"	2021	-	-	-	So Cold I Do Em 2
"Hundiddy Bop Bop"	2021	-	-	-	So Cold I Do Em 2
"Touchable Freestyle"	2021	-	-	-	So Cold I Do Em 2
"Shake Down" (featuring Ralfy the Plug & Young Bull)	2021	-	-	-	So Cold I Do Em 2
"Go Crazy"	2021	-	-	-	So Cold I Do Em 2
"Whole Lotta Ice"	2021	-	-	-	So Cold I Do Em 2
"Hang With The Opps"	2022	-	-	-	Keep the Truth Alive
"Just Retire" (featuring Ralfy the Plug & Shordie Shordie)	2022	-	-	-	A Cold Day In Hell (Deluxe)
"Close That Backdoor" (featuring Ralfy the Plug)	2022	-	-	-	A Cold Day In Hell (Deluxe)
"Cold Day In Hell" (featuring Ralfy the Plug & Jay Critch)	2022	-	-	-	A Cold Day In Hell (Deluxe)

== See also ==
- List of murdered hip hop musicians
