= Death Bed (Coffee for Your Head) =

2020 single by Powfu featuring Beabadoobee

Single by Powfu featuring Beabadoobee

from the EP Poems of the Past
- Released: February 8, 2020
- Genre: Lo-fi hip hop; emo rap
- Length: 2:53
- Label: Columbia; Robots + Humans
- Songwriters: Isaiah Faber; Beatrice Laus; Oscar Lang
- Producer: Otterpop

Powfu singles chronology
"Don't Fall Asleep Yet" (2020)	"Death Bed (Coffee for Your Head)" (2020)	"I'm Used to It" (2020)

Beabadoobee singles chronology
"I Wish I Was Stephen Malkmus" (2019)	"Death Bed (Coffee for Your Head)" (2020)	"Care" (2020)

Music video
- "Death Bed (Coffee for Your Head)" on YouTube

"Death Bed (Coffee for Your Head)" (stylized in all lowercase) is a song by Canadian rapper and singer Powfu featuring Filipino-English singer-songwriter Beabadoobee. The song was initially uploaded to SoundCloud and YouTube in 2019; after Powfu signed with Columbia Records and Robots + Humans, the song was released on streaming services on February 8, 2020. The song samples Beabadoobee's 2017 song "Coffee".

The song went viral on the video-sharing app TikTok and through radio airplay in early 2020. On TikTok, the song had over 4.1 billion plays for the month of March 2020 alone.

== Background ==
Originally released on the Some Boring, Love Stories, Pt. 2 EP in February 2019, the song's commercial release was delayed by a year due to the clearance of the sample of Beabadoobee's 2017 song "Coffee". Powfu said on Twitter in April 2019 that he had not put it on Spotify because he was "scared [he'd] get in trouble from the sample [he] use[s] in it", but said he "would upload it anyway" and told his followers to give him "a week and a half". It was finally released to streaming and download services in February 2020. On May 28, 2020, a later version featured on his EP Poems of the Past, which included the original version, was released featuring American pop punk band Blink-182.

== Composition ==
"Death Bed"
A 17-second sample of "Death Bed (Coffee for Your Head)" by Powfu.

Columbia's British subsidiary Sony Music UK described it as a lo-fi hip hop single, while Aliya Chaudhry from Consequence deemed it as an emo rap song.

== Music video ==
The video performance was officially uploaded to Powfu's YouTube channel on April 1, 2020. As of April 21, 2025, it has accumulated more than 769 million views, becoming Powfu's most viewed video.

The video shows Powfu portraying a man monologuing his life as he is sitting on his bed in a forest with intervening clips of him and his love interest. Powfu's love interest is portrayed by his wife.

In October 2024, by popular demand, Powfu released "death bed, pt. 2".

== Accolades ==
Year	Award	Category	Result	Ref
2021	SOCAN Awards	Viral Song Award	Won	
2021	BMI Pop Awards	Most Performed Songs of the Year	Won	

== Charts ==
=== Weekly charts ===
Chart (2020)	Peak position
Argentina Hot 100 (Billboard)	61
Australia (ARIA)	5
Austria (Ö3 Austria Top 40)	11
Belgium (Ultratop 50 Flanders)	7
Belgium (Ultratop 50 Wallonia)	29
Brazil (Top 100 Brasil)	69
Canada Hot 100 (Billboard)	11
Costa Rica (Monitor Latino)	13
Czech Republic Airplay (ČNS IFPI)	45
Czech Republic Singles Digital (ČNS IFPI)	7
Denmark (Tracklisten)	10
Estonia (Eesti Tipp-40)	9
Finland (Suomen virallinen lista)	9
France (SNEP)	19
Germany (GfK)	18
Global 200 (Billboard)	43
Hungary (Stream Top 40)	13
Iceland (Tónlistinn)	26
Ireland (IRMA)	7
Italy (FIMI)	6
Israel International Airplay (Media Forest)	7
Malaysia Streaming (RIM)	1
Mexico (Billboard Ingles Airplay)	1
Netherlands (Dutch Top 40)	13
Netherlands (Single Top 100)	11
New Zealand (Recorded Music NZ)	5
Norway (VG-lista)	14
Poland Airplay (ZPAV)	4
Portugal (AFP)	7
Romania (Airplay 100)	54
Scottish Singles Sales (Official Charts)	4
Singapore (RIAS)	1
Slovakia Singles Digital (ČNS IFPI)	17
Slovenia (SloTop50)	24
Spain (Promusicae)	38
Sweden (Sverigetopplistan)	15
Switzerland (Schweizer Hitparade)	13
UK Singles (Official Charts)	4
US Billboard Hot 100	23
US Adult Pop Airplay (Billboard)	19
US Dance Airplay (Billboard)	31
US Hot Rap Songs (Billboard)	9
US Hot Rock & Alternative Songs (Billboard)	1
US Pop Airplay (Billboard)	8
US Rhythmic Airplay (Billboard)	15
US Rock & Alternative Airplay (Billboard)	3
US Rolling Stone Top 100	12

=== Monthly charts ===
Chart (2020)	Peak position
Brazil (Pro-Música Brasil)	16

=== Year-end charts ===
Chart (2020)	Position
Australia (ARIA)	20
Austria (Ö3 Austria Top 40)	52
Belgium (Ultratop Flanders)	51
Belgium (Ultratop Wallonia)	53
Canada (Canadian Hot 100)	28
Denmark (Tracklisten)	57
France (SNEP)	55
Germany (Official German Charts)	68
Hungary (Stream Top 40)	52
Ireland (IRMA)	43
Italy (FIMI)	46
Netherlands (Dutch Top 40)	83
Netherlands (Single Top 100)	60
New Zealand (Recorded Music NZ)	21
Norway (VG-lista)	39
Poland (ZPAV)	60
Portugal (AFP)	29
Sweden (Sverigetopplistan)	38
Switzerland (Schweizer Hitparade)	27
UK Singles (OCC)	21
US Billboard Hot 100	43
US Mainstream Top 40 (Billboard)	27
US Hot Rock & Alternative Songs (Billboard)	5

Chart (2021)	Position
Global 200 (Billboard)	176

== Certifications ==
Region	Certification	Certified units/sales
Australia (ARIA)	3× Platinum	210,000^{‡}
Belgium (BRMA)	Gold	20,000^{‡}
Brazil (Pro-Música Brasil)	Platinum	40,000^{‡}
Canada (Music Canada)	5× Platinum	400,000^{‡}
Denmark (IFPI Danmark)	Platinum	90,000^{‡}
France (SNEP)	Diamond	333,333^{‡}
Germany (BVMI)	Gold	200,000^{‡}
Italy (FIMI)	2× Platinum	140,000^{‡}
Mexico (AMPROFON)	4× Platinum	240,000^{‡}
New Zealand (RMNZ)	4× Platinum	120,000^{‡}
Poland (ZPAV)	2× Platinum	40,000^{‡}
Portugal (AFP)	2× Platinum	20,000^{‡}
Spain (Promusicae)	Platinum	60,000^{‡}
Switzerland (IFPI Switzerland)	Platinum	20,000^{‡}
United Kingdom (BPI)	2× Platinum	1,200,000^{‡}
United States (RIAA)	5× Platinum	5,000,000^{‡}
Streaming
Sweden (GLF)	2× Platinum	16,000,000^{†}
^{‡} Sales+streaming figures based on certification alone.^{†} Streaming-only figures based on certification alone.

== Release history ==
Country	Date	Format	Label	Ref.
Various	February 8, 2020	Digital download; streaming	Columbia; Robots and Humans	
United States	April 7, 2020	Contemporary hit radio	Columbia	
