= The Godfather III (album) =

Studio album by Wiley
- Released: 5 June 2020
- Recorded: 2019–2020
- Genre: Grime
- Length: 63:10
- Label: Wiley Records

Wiley chronology
Godfather II (2018)	The Godfather III (2020)	Boasty Gang (2020)

Singles from The Godfather III
- 1. "The Game" Released: 6 January 2020

Professional ratings
Aggregate scores
Source	Rating
Metacritic	79/100
Review scores
Source	Rating
AllMusic	4/5 stars
Clash	7/10
Loud and Quiet	8/10
NME	4/5 stars
Pitchfork	7.2/10

The Godfather III is the thirteenth studio album by English grime MC Wiley. It was originally scheduled for release on 12 September 2019 under CTA Records, but was delayed to 5 June 2020.

== Critical reception ==
The Godfather III was met with "generally favorable" reviews from critics. At Metacritic, which assigns a weighted average rating out of 100 to reviews from mainstream publications, this release received an average score of 79, based on 7 reviews.

== Track listing ==
Track listing adapted from Genius

The Godfather III track listing
No.	Title	Writer(s)	Producer(s)	Length
1.	"Intro"	Richard Kylea Cowie	Infamous	1:29
2.	"Come Home" (featuring Blay Vision & Realz)	Blay Vision; Realz; Cowie	Maniac	2:52
3.	"The Game"	Cowie	Zdot; Krunchie	2:40
4.	"Da Vibez Is Back"	Cowie	Zdot	2:19
5.	"Protect the Empire" (featuring Jammz & K9)	Jammz; K9; Cowie	Thomas Mellor	2:53
6.	"Eskimo Dance"	Big Swingz; Delusions; K9; Tempa T; Jammz; Ten Dixon; Flowdan	Daz-I-Kue; Wookie; Hindzy D; Dizzee Rascal; DJ Eastwood	3:32
7.	"Alla Dem" (featuring Riko Dan)	Cowie	Scratcha DVA	3:32
8.	"Bars" (featuring D Double E)	Cowie; D Double E	Swifta Beater	2:33
9.	"Family" (featuring Flirta D, Footsie & Goldie1)	Cowie	Mr. Virgo	3:34
10.	"This Is It"	Cowie	Flyo	2:47
11.	"Bruce Wayne"	Cowie	Dexplicit	3:35
12.	"Double Dragon"	Cowie; J2K	Masro	2:07
13.	"Starring" (featuring K9, GHSTLY XXVII, Jammer & K9)	Cowie		3:02
14.	"Amsterdam" (featuring Manga Saint Hilare, Breeze & Jammer)	Cowie		3:30
15.	"Balance" (featuring Aisa)	Cowie	Terror Danjah	2:47
16.	"Free Spirit"	Cowie	Rymez	3:33
17.	"Light Work"	Cowie	K-Notes; Freeza Chin	3:09
18.	"Rinse"	Cowie	Donae'o	2:47
19.	"Image Ting"	Cowie	JLSXND7RS	3:16
20.	"West London" (featuring Big Zuu & Direman)	Direman; GHSTLY XXVII; K9; Big Zuu; Cowie	Crafty 893	3:16
21.	"South London"	Cowie	Mazza	2:48
22.	"Press Record"	Cowie		2:21
Total length:				63:10

== Charts ==
Chart performance for The Godfather III
Chart (2020)	Peak position
Scottish Albums (OCC)	99
UK R&B Albums (OCC)	3
