= Yikes (Nicki Minaj song) =

2020 single by Nicki Minaj

Promotional single by Nicki Minaj
- Released: February 7, 2020
- Recorded: February 2020
- Genre: Trap
- Length: 2:36
- Label: Young Money; Cash Money; Republic
- Songwriters: Nicki Minaj; Darryl Clemons; Taji Ausar; Bobby Barrett
- Producers: Pooh Beatz; Tane Runo; Deafh Beats

Lyric video
- "Yikes" on YouTube

"Yikes" is a song by American rapper Nicki Minaj. It was released as a standalone promotional single on February 7, 2020. It debuted at number 23 on the US Billboard Hot 100.

== Background ==
Minaj first teased the song with a snippet on her Twitter on February 4, 2020. The snippet received criticism for lyrics including the late activist Rosa Parks, to which Minaj responded that "she had no clue anyone was mad" and does not care. On February 6, 2020, she revealed the cover art and announced that it would be released later that night. The cover shows the rapper and her husband Kenneth Petty in a Ferrari 488 with Minaj waving to photographer Amanda Barona.

== Composition and lyrics ==
Minaj revealed via Twitter that the song originally only contained one verse, heard in a snippet she previewed online. She jokingly added that her fans and label then "bullied" her into finishing the song and releasing it.

According to Minaj, she freestyled the chorus, upon hearing the song's beat for the "very first time". The outro was also freestyled. Minaj said she wanted to be "aggressive" on the track, but opted to make a "switch" after the fourth line in the second verse. The song contains a bass-heavy, click-clack beat and spacey, spare keyboards. In the song, Minaj references civil rights activist Rosa Parks, with the line "All you bitches Rosa Parks, uh-oh, get your ass up". Trent Fitzgerald of XXL Mag said that the song features a "biting chorus in which Nicki raps, 'You a clown you do it for likes'", noting how "interestingly, that's the same thing she said during her intense and personal quarrel with [her ex-boyfriend] Meek Mill on social media on February 5, 2020".

== Critical reception ==
Complex magazine's Jessica McKinney listed the song among the best new music of the week, saying it is nice to see "Nicki's still got it", while calling "Yikes" a "cocky record that appears to target the 'clowns' on social media". Erika Marie of HotNewHipHop gave the song a positive review, and said although the line referencing Rosa Parks "seemed to get everyone in a tizzy", "Yikes" "is much more than a one-liner track". Marie also opined that despite Minaj having been "criticized lately for spending more time appealing to the pop music masses, [...] it seems that the Queens emcee is back with the smack-talking rhymes that the Barbz [her fans] can't get enough of hearing".

== Chart performance ==
"Yikes" debuted and peaked at number 23 on the US Billboard Hot 100, making it her highest charting promo single as a lead artist while also marking Minaj's 108th entry, an all-time record for a female artist at that time. It also debuted at the summit of the Digital Songs component chart with 20,000 digital downloads sold within its first week of availability, while garnering 15.5 million streams. "Yikes" also debuted at number 6 on the Rolling Stone Top 100.

== Personnel ==
Credits adapted from Tidal.

- Nicki Minaj – vocals, songwriting
- Darryl Clemons – songwriting, production, programming
- Taji "Tane Runo" Ausar – production, programming
- Bobby Barrett – production, programming
- Derrick Milano – songwriting
- Jamal Berry – assistant recording engineering
- Chris Athens – mastering engineering
- Aubry "Big Juice" Delaine – mixing

== Charts ==
Chart (2020)	Peak position
Canada Hot 100 (Billboard)	54
Greece (IFPI)	52
Hungary (Single Top 40)	16
Ireland (IRMA)	85
New Zealand Hot Singles (RMNZ)	15
Scotland Singles (OCC)	35
UK Singles (OCC)	69
US Billboard Hot 100	23
US Hot R&B/Hip-Hop Songs (Billboard)	13
US Rolling Stone Top 100	6

== Certifications ==
Region	Certification	Certified units/sales
Australia (ARIA)	Gold	35,000^{‡}
Brazil (Pro-Música Brasil)	Gold	20,000^{‡}
New Zealand (RMNZ)	Gold	15,000^{‡}
United States (RIAA)	2× Platinum	2,000,000^{‡}
^{‡} Sales+streaming figures based on certification alone.
