= Poems of the Past =

2020 extended play by Powfu

EP by Powfu
- Released: May 15, 2020
- Length: 17:05
- Label: Columbia; Powfu
- Producer: Otterpop; 8rokeboy; Powfu; Sarcastic Sounds; Monty Datta; Skinny Atlas; Joaquim Francisco

Powfu chronology
Some Boring Love Stories, Pt. 4 (2019)	Poems of the Past (2020)	Some Boring Love Stories, Pt. 5 (2020)

Singles from Poems of the Past
- 1. "Death Bed (Coffee for Your Head)" Released: February 8, 2020; 2. "I'm Used to It" Released: April 17, 2020; 3. "I'll Come Back to You" Released: May 12, 2020

Poems of the Past (stylized in all lowercase) is the sixth extended play (EP) and major label debut by Canadian rapper Powfu. It was released on May 15, 2020, through Columbia Records and Powfu Productions.

== Background ==
The EP was announced on May 13, 2020. About the EP, Powfu said:

"The six songs on this EP are some of my favorites that I've ever recorded. I had a lot of fun experimenting with different features and sounds, and I hope everyone finds their own favorite song on it, whether they like hip-hop, punk, lo-fi or bedroom pop. Some of these songs were written about my own personal past, some are romantic stories I wanted to tell, but now they're for the fans to interpret for themselves."

== Critical reception ==
Professional ratings
Review scores
Source	Rating
NME	3/5 stars

Jon Caramanica of The New York Times said the EP is "just one drop in the glut of music he has released in the last two years, much of it excellent." Sam Higgins of NME called the songs "vulnerable and downbeat, the message relatable to the youth of today who are going through the same things."

== Track listing ==
Poems of the Past track listing
No.	Title	Writer(s)	Producer(s)	Length
1.	"Death Bed (Coffee for Your Head)" (featuring Beabadoobee)	Isaiah Faber; Beatrice Laus; Oscar Lang; Christian Klosterman	Otterpop	2:53
2.	"I'm Used to It"	Faber	8rokeboy	2:55
3.	"I'll Come Back to You" (featuring Sarcastic Sounds and Rxseboy)	Faber; Jeremy Fedryk; Anthony Tubbs	Powfu; Sarcastic Sounds	2:14
4.	"A World of Chaos" (featuring Rxseboy, Jomie, and Ivri)	Faber; Tubbs; Joseph Garcell; Nicolas Marchese; Sudipta Datta; Solomon Thompson; Ivri Wright	Powfu; Monty Datta; Skinny Atlas	2:42
5.	"Popular Girl, Typical Boy" (featuring Sleep.Ing)	Faber; Joaquim Francisco; Patience Faber	Powfu; Joaquim Francisco	4:06
6.	"Death Bed (Bonus Remix)" (featuring Beabadoobee and Blink-182)	Faber; Laus; Lang; Klosterman	Otterpop	2:13
Total length:				17:05

== Charts ==
Chart performance for Poems of the Past
Chart (2020)	Peak position
Canadian Albums (Billboard)	53
French Albums (SNEP)	57
US Billboard 200	134
US Top Alternative Albums (Billboard)	5

== Certifications ==
Certifications for Poems of the Past
Region	Certification	Certified units/sales
New Zealand (RMNZ)	Gold	7,500^{‡}
Poland (ZPAV)	Gold	10,000^{‡}
^{‡} Sales+streaming figures based on certification alone.

== Release history ==
Release history for Poems of the Past
Region	Date	Format	Label	Ref.
Various	May 15, 2020	Digital download; streaming	Powfu Productions; Columbia	
