= Want Beef? =

2019 single by YSN Flow featuring BaeBae Savo

Single by YSN Flow featuring BaeBae Savo
- Released: April 20, 2019
- Recorded: November 2018
- Genre: Hip hop
- Length: 2:35
- Label: L462
- Songwriter(s): Kamron Ford
- Producer(s): Dom Whore

YSN Flow singles chronology
"Go Dumb" (2019)	"Want Beef?" (2019)	"Shoes Tied" (2019)

BaeBae Savo singles chronology
"Scared to Book Me" (2019)	"Want Beef?" (2019)	"Minimum Wage" (2019)

Music video
- "Want Beef?" on YouTube

Remix cover
- Cover art of the official remix featuring Quando Rondo.

"Want Beef?" is a single by American rapper YSN Flow featuring American rapper BaeBae Savo, released on April 20, 2019. Produced by Dom Whore, it is considered YSN Flow's breakout song. The song was followed by two sequels, "Want Beef? 2.0" and "Want Beef? 3.0", and a remix featuring American rapper Quando Rondo.

== Background ==
YSN Flow recorded his portion of the song in October 2018 in his closet, using a mitten as a pop filter. He found the beat on YouTube and was freestyle rapping to it. Flow called a friend, sharing him an early version of the song, and followed his advice to change some of the lyrics. YSN Flow decided to collaborate with BaeBae Savo, a locally well-known rapper in Cleveland, and connected with him about three days after first recording the song. Although the song was finished in November, YSN Flow waited until April 2019 to release it as he felt it had been the right time. When the appropriate weather arrived, Flow shot the music video and released the song. It gradually gained wide recognition and led to many record labels seeking him.

== Composition ==
The song features an acoustic guitar instrumental, over which YSN Flow melodically raps at a quick pace about handling disputes in both the streets and online.

== Critical reception ==
Alphonse Pierre of Pitchfork praised YSN Flow's performance of the song, writing "through a bright voice and youthful charm his song 'Want Beef?' feels like its own creation."

== Remix ==
An official remix of the song featuring Quando Rondo was released on January 17, 2020. It appears on YSN Flow's debut studio album Flow $ZN (2020).

== Certifications ==
Region	Certification	Certified units/sales
United States (RIAA)	Gold	500,000^{‡}
^{‡} Sales+streaming figures based on certification alone.
