= Powfu =

Canadian rapper, songwriter, and record producer (born 1999)

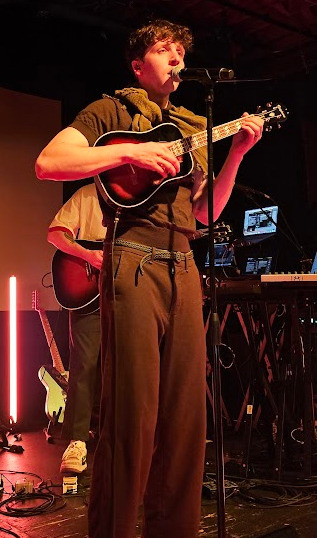
- Faber at Motorco Music Hall in 2026

Background information
- Born: Isaiah Faber; March 31, 1999 (age 27); Vancouver, British Columbia, Canada
- Genres: Hip hop; lo-fi
- Occupations: Rapper; singer; songwriter; record producer
- Years active: 2018–present
- Labels: Columbia; Robots + Humans
- Spouse: Natasha Desiree (m. 2021)
- Website: powfuofficial.com

Isaiah Faber (born March 31, 1999), known professionally as Powfu, is a Canadian rapper, singer, songwriter, and record producer. He is the son of Dave Faber from the band Faber Drive. He amassed popularity following the release of his first charting single, "Death Bed (Coffee for Your Head)", featuring Beabadoobee, which peaked at number 23 on the Billboard Hot 100.

== Life and career ==
Isaiah Faber was born on March 31, 1999, in Vancouver, British Columbia, Canada. His father is Dave Faber of the band Faber Drive. He learned to play the drums at age two, and as a teenager, he borrowed his father's microphone and began rapping over "super relaxing" beats he found online. In high school, he began recording in his basement and uploading his favorite songs to SoundCloud.

In February 2019, he released the song "Death Bed" on SoundCloud and YouTube, sampling British singer Beabadoobee's debut single "Coffee." It garnered 5 million plays on SoundCloud and 24 million plays on YouTube. He subsequently licensed the Beabadoobee sample and re-released it in February 2020 under the title "Death Bed (Coffee for Your Head)." The single surpassed 1 billion plays on Spotify in June 2021 and gained popularity through the video-sharing app TikTok, peaking at number 23 on the Billboard Hot 100. Powfu subsequently signed with Columbia Records in the US and Robots + Humans in the UK. The song appeared on the EP Poems of the Past, which was released on May 29, 2020.

On December 2, 2022, Powfu released his first full-length album, Surrounded by Hounds and Serpents, which included a cover of Taylor Swift's "Mine". In an interview with Billboard, he stated that this album title describes his search to spot "people who are fake or only want [him] for the wrong reasons".

== Discography ==
=== Studio albums ===
List of albums, with release date, label and selected chart positions shown
Title	Details
Surrounded by Hounds and Serpents	Released: December 2, 2022; Label: Powfu Productions, Columbia; Formats: Digital download, streaming
Verses That Never Surfaced (demos)	Released: February 1, 2023; Label: Independent; Formats: Digital download, streaming
Gathered by the Lantern	Released: October 6, 2023; Label: Powfu Productions; Formats: Digital download, streaming
The Fleeting Life of a Fool	Released: May 4, 2024; Label: Powfu Productions; Formats: Digital download, streaming
Mafia and Mugs Rootbeer	Released: October 4, 2024; Label: Powfu Productions; Formats: Digital download, streaming

=== Extended plays ===
List of extended plays, with release date, label and selected chart positions shown
Title	Details	Peak chart positions				Certifications
Title	Details	CAN	FRA	US	US Alt.	Certifications
Some Boring Love Stories	Released: December 12, 2018; Label: PowPow; Format: Digital download, streaming	—	—	—	—	
Some Boring Love Stories, Pt. 2	Released: February 16, 2019; Label: PowPow; Format: Digital download, streaming	—	—	—	—	
Some Boring Love Stories, Pt. 3	Released: April 10, 2019; Label: PowPow; Format: Digital download, streaming	—	—	—	—	
Letters You Never Received	Released: July 18, 2019; Label: Independent; Formats: Digital download, streaming	—	—	—	—	
Some Boring Love Stories, Pt. 4	Released: November 12, 2019; Label: PowPow; Format: Digital download, streaming	—	—	—	—	
Poems of the Past	Released: May 29, 2020; Label: Powfu Productions, Robots + Humans; Format: Digital download, streaming	53	57	134	5	RMNZ: Gold; ZPAV: Gold
Some Boring Love Stories, Pt. 5	Released: November 20, 2020; Label: Powfu Productions, Columbia; Format: Digital download, streaming	—	—	—	—	
Drinking Under the Streetlights	Released: June 4, 2021; Label: Powfu Productions, Columbia; Format: Digital download, streaming	—	—	—	—	
Tell Me Your Feelings and I Won't Tell You Mine	Released: October 8, 2021; Label: Powfu Productions, Columbia; Format: Digital download, streaming	—	—	—	—	
Tell Me Your Feelings and I Won't Tell You Mine Pt. 2	Release: March 31, 2023; Label: Powfu Productions, Columbia; Format: Digital download, streaming	—	—	—	—	
Flooding The Gates (with Ouse & Snøw)	Released: June 30, 2023; Label: Powfu Productions, Columbia; Formats: Digital download, streaming	—	—	—	—	
Tell Me Your Feelings, I Won't Tell You Mine, Pt 3	Released: November 1, 2024; Label: Independent; Formats: Digital download, streaming	—	—	—	—	
The Life of a Lofi Boy	Released: June 29, 2025; Label: Lofi Records; Formats: Digital download, streaming	—	—	—	—	
"—" denotes a recording that has not charted

=== Singles ===
==== As lead artist ====
List of singles, with year released, selected chart positions and certifications, and album name shown
Title	Year	Peak chart positions										Certifications	Album
Title	Year	CAN	AUS	BEL	DEN	FRA	IRE	NL	NZ	UK	US	Certifications	Album
"Letters in December" (with Rxseboy)	2019	—	—	—	—	—	—	—	—	—	—		Non-album singles
"Dead Eyes" (with Promoting Sounds and Ouse!)	2019	—	—	—	—	—	—	—	—	—	—		Non-album singles
"Hide in Your Blue Eyes" (with Thomas Reid)	2019	—	—	—	—	—	—	—	—	—	—		Non-album singles
"Laying on My Porch While We Watch the World End." (with Rxseboy and Slipfunc)	2020	—	—	—	—	—	—	—	—	—	—		Non-album singles
"Don't Fall Asleep Yet" (with ENRA)	2020	—	—	—	—	—	—	—	—	—	—		Non-album singles
"Death Bed (Coffee for Your Head)" (featuring Beabadoobee)	2020	11	5	7	10	19	7	11	5	4	23	MC: 5× Platinum; ARIA: 3× Platinum; BEA: Gold; BPI: 2× Platinum; IFPI DEN: Platinum; RIAA: 5× Platinum; RMNZ: 4× Platinum; SNEP: Diamond	Poems of the Past
"I'm Used to It"	2020	—	—	—	—	—	—	—	—	—	—		Poems of the Past
"I'll Come Back to You"	2020	—	—	—	—	—	—	—	—	—	—		Poems of the Past
"Eyes" (with Lilyung & Chrisbeats)	2020	—	—	—	—	—	—	—	—	—	—		Non-album single
"17again"	2020	—	—	—	—	—	—	—	—	—	—		Some Boring Love Stories Pt. 5
"Stay4ever" (featuring Mounika.)	2020	—	—	—	—	—	—	—	—	—	—		Some Boring Love Stories Pt. 5
"When the Hospital Was My Home" (with Rxseboy)	2020	—	—	—	—	—	—	—	—	—	—		Some Boring Love Stories Pt. 5
"The Way That You See Me" (with Rxseboy and Sarcastic Sounds featuring Ayleen Valentine)	2021	—	—	—	—	—	—	—	—	—	—		Drinking Under the Streetlights
"Survivor" (with Known. and Kultargotbounce)	2021	—	—	—	—	—	—	—	—	—	—		Non-album single
"The Long Way Home" (with Sarcastic Sounds and Sara Kays)	2021	—	—	—	—	—	—	—	—	—	—		Drinking Under the Streetlights
"Mario Kart" (with Travis Barker)	2021	—	—	—	—	—	—	—	—	—	—		Drinking Under the Streetlights
"Losing Sleep" (with Dvbbs)	2021	—	—	—	—	—	—	—	—	—	—		Sleep
"I Hate Waking Up" (with Rxseboy, SadBoyProlific, Alek Olsen)	2022	—	—	—	—	—	—	—	—	—	—		Surrounded by Hounds and Serpents
"Shade of Blue" (with Rxseboy, Tia Tia, Shalfi)	2022	—	—	—	—	—	—	—	—	—	—		Surrounded by Hounds and Serpents
"Fault in the Stars" (with the Chainsmokers)	2023	—	—	—	—	—	—	—	—	—	—		Non-album single
"Beautiful as Ever" (with Forrest Frank and Nextseasons)	2024	—	—	—	—	—	—	—	—	—	— (Note: "Beautiful as Ever" did not enter the Billboard Hot 100, but peaked at No. 38 on the Hot Christian Songs chart)		Non-album single
"—" denotes a recording that did not chart or was not released in that territory.

==== As featured artist ====
Title	Year	Album
"Feel That Again" (Happily Sad featuring Powfu)	2018	Non-album singles
"Fall in Love" (Lil Skele featuring Powfu)	2019	Non-album singles
"When We Were 16" (Rxseboy featuring Mishaal, Powfu)	2019	Non-album singles
"Eyes Blue Like the Atlantic, Pt. 2" (Sista Prod featuring Alec Benjamin, Rxseboy and Powfu)	2020	Non-album singles
"Tell Me When You Change" (Jay Sek featuring Powfu)	2020	Non-album singles
"Some Nights" (Jomie featuring Sarcastic Sounds, Rxseboy, Powfu)	2020	Evidence I Exist
"How to Live" (yaeow featuring Powfu and Sarcastic Sounds)	2021	Non-album singles
"You Left Me Alone With My Nightmares" (Vaboh featuring Powfu)	2020	Non-album singles
"Speed Limit" (Ollie featuring Powfu)	2020	Non-album singles
"Too Many Problems" (Ouse featuring Powfu)	2020	Crying In Camo
"Hold Somebody" (guccihighwaters featuring Sarcastic Sounds, Powfu)	2020	Joke's on You
"Contigo" (BoyWithUke featuring Powfu)	2022	Serotonin Dreams
"Don't Ever Think Twice" (Skinny Atlas featuring Powfu)	2025	Don't Ever Think Twice

== Accolades ==
Year	Award	Category	Result	Ref.
2021	iHeartRadio Music Awards	Best New Rock/Alternative Rock Artist	Won	
2021	Juno Awards	Breakthrough Artist of the Year	Nominated	
