= Thank You for Using GTL =

Mixtape by Drakeo the Ruler
- Released: June 5, 2020
- Genre: West Coast hip hop
- Length: 53:06
- Label: Stinc Team
- Producer: JoogSZN

Drakeo the Ruler chronology
FreeDrakeo (2020)	Thank You for Using GTL (2020)	We Know the Truth (2020)

Thank You for Using GTL is a 2020 mixtape by Drakeo the Ruler. It was produced by JoogSZN with verses recorded by Drakeo from Men's Central Jail using phone service from GTL.

== Reception ==
Professional ratings
Review scores
Source	Rating
Pitchfork	8.5/10
Spectrum Culture	4/5 stars

Thank You for Using GTL received positive reviews from critics. Matthew Ismael Ruiz at Pitchfork called it "likely the greatest rap album ever recorded from jail". Daniel Bromfield at Spectrum Culture noted its themes of "the carceral state, capitalism, the prison-industrial complex, the U.S. criminal justice system's targeting of rap and rappers, and the ongoing game of real vs. fiction taking place within hip hop itself."

=== Accolades ===
Accolades for Thank You for Using GTL
Publication	Accolade	Rank	Ref.
Pitchfork	The 50 Best Albums of 2020	32	

== Track listing ==
Thank You for Using GTL track listing
No.	Title	Length
1.	"Intro"	0:46
2.	"Quit Rappin"	2:25
3.	"Tell You the Truth"	3:38
4.	"GTA VI"	2:35
5.	"Backflip or Sumn"	3:22
6.	"Keep It 100"	2:35
7.	"R.I.P. Barney's"	2:03
8.	"Bad Timing"	2:06
9.	"Social Media Can't Help You"	3:04
10.	"Maestro's Tension"	2:49
11.	"Fuck tha Party Up" (featuring Rio Da Yung OG)	3:16
12.	"Chalk Zone" (featuring Lil 9)	2:39
13.	"Pressure"	2:48
14.	"I Want It All"	3:03
15.	"It's a Secret" (featuring ALLBLACK)	2:49
16.	"Spousal Abuse"	2:43
17.	"Ice Chili"	2:59
18.	"To Be Honest"	3:03
19.	"Fictional"	4:05
Total length:		53:06
