= Nick Brooks =

American author, filmmaker and rapper

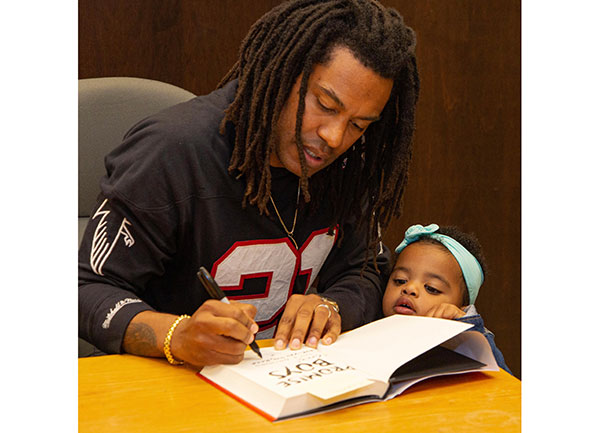
- Born: Washington, D.C., U.S.
- Education: Howard University; George Mason University; University of Southern California (MFA)
- Occupation: Author
- Writing career
- Genres: Young Adult Fiction, Short film

Nick Brooks is an American author, filmmaker and rapper who performs under the stage name Ben Kenobe.

He wrote the middle-grade novel, Nothing Interesting Ever Happens to Ethan Fairmont, published in 2022, and young adult novel, Promise Boys, published in 2023. His short film, BEE, debuted at the 2020 American Black Film Fest.

== Life and career ==
Nick Brooks was born in Washington, D.C. He graduated from Howard University, George Mason University, and from University of Southern California, with a M.F.A. in Film and TV Production, in 2020. At USC his films earned him the George Lucas Scholar Award, and the Jack Larson and James Bridges Award for Writing and Directing.

In 2021 Macmillan Publishing pre-empted Brooks' young adult debut, Promise Boys. Promise Boys was released and was followed up by Brooks' novel, Up In Smoke, which released in May 2025. The audiobook for Promise Boys won the 2024 Odyssey Award for Young Adults.

Nick is a writer on Grand Theft Auto VI.

== Films ==
- BEE (2020)

== Literary Works ==
=== Middle-Grade Novels ===
- Nothing Interesting Ever Happens to Ethan Fairmont (2022)
- Too Many Interesting Things Are Happening To Ethan Fairmont (2023)
- Everything Interesting Keeps Happening to Ethan Fairmont (2024)

=== Young Adult Novels ===
- Promise Boys (2023)
- Up In Smoke (2025)

=== Graphic Novels ===
- Fractured: X-Men Team Spirit Book #1 (2027)

== Bibliography ==
- —— (2022). Nothing Interesting Ever Happens to Ethan Fairmont. Union Square Publishing. ISBN 9781454945574.
- —— (2023). Promise Boys. Henry Holt. ISBN 9781250866974.
- —— (2023). Too Many Interesting Things Are Happening to Ethan Fairmont. Sterling Publishing Company, Incorporated. ISBN 9781454947110.
- —— (2025). Up in Smoke. Henry Holt. ISBN 9781250359933.
