= I Think I'm Good =

Studio album by Kassa Overall
- Released: February 28, 2020
- Length: 39:55
- Label: Brownswood
- Producer: Kassa Overall

Kassa Overall chronology
Go Get Ice Cream and Listen to Jazz (2019)	I Think I'm Good (2020)	Animals (2023)

I Think I'm Good is the second studio album by American musician Kassa Overall. It was released on February 28, 2020, through Brownswood Recordings.

== Background ==
Kassa Overall is an American drummer, record producer, rapper, and vocalist. I Think I'm Good is his second studio album, following Go Get Ice Cream and Listen to Jazz (2019). The voice of Angela Davis is used on the album's track "Show Me a Prison". The album was released on February 28, 2020, through Brownswood Recordings. A short film of the same name, which features selections from the album, was released in 2020.

== Critical reception ==
Professional ratings
Review scores
Source	Rating
AllMusic	4/5 stars
DownBeat	4/5 stars
Pitchfork	7.9/10

Ammar Kalia of DownBeat wrote, "On his second LP, I Think I'm Good, Overall finds the sweet spot between politically infused hip-hop and languorous jazz." Tom Moon of NPR commented that "It's not another jazz-meets-hip-hop scrum: It's the sound of whole new lanes opening up." Thom Jurek of AllMusic stated, "Ultimately, I Think I'm Good is not merely the work of a fine backpack producer, but that of a master conceptualist and painterly musician compelled by both a rigorous aesthetic sensibility and the weighty importance of his chosen topics to deliver a provocative and genuinely seamless musical fusion for the future."

=== Accolades ===
Year-end lists for I Think I'm Good
Publication	List	Rank	Ref.
AllMusic	Favorite Jazz Albums	—	
The Guardian	The 50 Best Albums of 2020	38	
Les Inrockuptibles	Top 100 Albums of 2020	67	

== Track listing ==
I Think I'm Good track listing
No.	Title	Length
1.	"Visible Walls"	3:03
2.	"Please Don't Kill Me" (featuring Joel Ross and Theo Croker)	2:59
3.	"Find Me" (featuring J Hoard)	4:52
4.	"I Know You See Me" (featuring J Hoard and Melanie Charles)	3:21
5.	"Sleeping on the Train"	1:05
6.	"Show Me a Prison" (featuring J Hoard and Angela Davis)	3:42
7.	"Halfway House"	3:45
8.	"Landline" (featuring Carlos Overall)	2:23
9.	"Darkness in Mind" (featuring Sullivan Fortner)	6:01
10.	"The Best of Life" (featuring Aaron Parks)	1:56
11.	"Got Me a Plan"	3:03
12.	"Was She Happy (for Geri Allen)" (featuring Vijay Iyer)	3:42
Total length:		39:55

== Personnel ==
Credits adapted from liner notes.

- Kassa Overall – vocals (1–4, 6–12), drums (2–5, 7–12), percussion (6), synthesizer bass (9, 10), production
- Mike King – synthesizer bass (1), synthesizer (1, 2), Mellotron (4, 7)
- Morgan Guerin – bass clarinet (1), saxophone (3), electronic wind instrument (3), electric bass (3), floor tom (3, 6), clarinet (9)
- Brandee Younger – harp (1, 2)
- Courtney Bryan – piano (1, 5)
- Jay Gandhi – bansuri (1, 5)
- Joel Ross – vibraphone (2)
- Theo Croker – flugelhorn (2)
- Stephan Crump – acoustic bass (2–4, 7, 9)
- Sullivan Fortner – piano (2, 7, 9)
- J Hoard – vocals (3, 4, 6)
- Paul Wilson – synthesizer (3), effects (3), synthesizer bass (6), mixing (1–9, 12)
- Julius Rodriguez – piano (3, 6), synthesizer (3, 6)
- Aaron Parks – sampled piano (3), piano (10), synthesizer (10)
- Melanie Charles – vocals (4)
- Bigyuki – synthesizer (4), synthesizer bass (4)
- Angela Davis – voicemail vocals (6)
- Craig Taborn – sampled piano (6)
- Carlos Overall – tenor saxophone (8)
- Mike Mohamed – drums (9)
- Rafiq Bhatia – guitar (10)
- Joe Dyson – drums (10)
- Tim Kennedy – piano (11)
- Vijay Iyer – Rhodes piano (12)
- Josh Giunta – mixing (1–8, 11, 12)
- Daniel Schlett – mixing (9, 10)
- Xander Knight – mixing (11)
- Mike Bozzi – mastering
- Lauren Du Graf – creative direction
- Jesse Brown – artwork

== Charts ==
Chart performance for I Think I'm Good
Chart (2020)	Peak position
UK Jazz & Blues Albums (OCC)	20
