= Kassa Overall =

Musician from Seattle

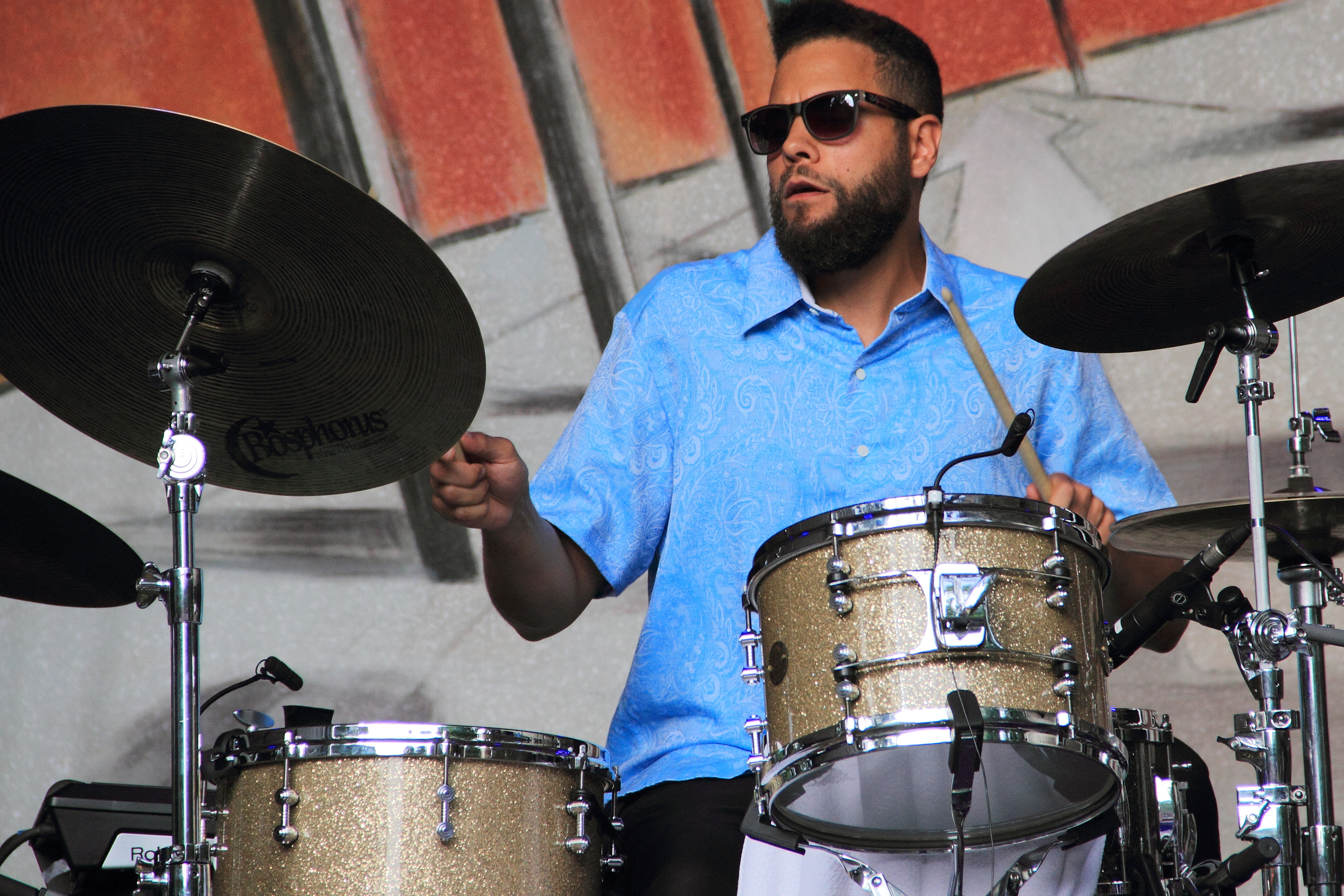
- Kassa Overall performing in 2014

Background information
- Born: Kassa Purush Overall; 9 October 1982 (age 43); Seattle, Washington, U.S.
- Genres: Jazz; hip hop
- Occupations: Musician; drummer; producer; rapper; songwriter
- Instrument: Drums
- Labels: Brownswood; Warp
- Website: kassaoverall.com

Kassa Purush Overall (born 9 October 1982) is an American jazz drummer, producer, rapper and bandleader.

== History ==
He was born and raised in Seattle, and attended Garfield High School, where several notable musicians have also attended including Jimi Hendrix and Quincy Jones. He started playing drums as a toddler after his parents gave his older brother a drum set.

Overall went on to study percussion at the Oberlin Conservatory. As an undergraduate at Oberlin, Overall once confronted faculty that endorsed his jazz studies but disapproved of his passion for hip-hop beat making. Also while in college, he experienced manic episodes that required brief hospitalization and led to him being put on medication. His lyrics often document his own mental health struggles, as well as the realities of living as a Black man within the American criminal-justice system.

Overall lived and worked in Brooklyn, New York for almost fifteen years. While living there, he played with numerous notable jazz figures including Christian McBride, Ravi Coltrane, and the late pianist Geri Allen. For a brief stint he played in Jon Batiste's band on the Late Show with Stephen Colbert.

He has also contributed drums to songs for Yoko Ono and dabbled as a rapper and producer, including collaborations with Francis and the Lights and Das Racist.

In 2019, he self-released his debut album, Go Get Ice Cream and Listen to Jazz. He was motivated to release his first solo work after the passing of Roy Hargrove, who appears on a track on the album. The album also features other artists including Arto Lindsay, Theo Croker, and Carmen Lundy, among others.

His second album I Think I'm Good was released in 2020 through Gilles Peterson's label Brownswood Recordings. The album again featured appearances from artists in Overall's community including Vijay Iyer, Brandee Younger, and Angela Davis.

In 2023, Overall was featured in The New York Times’ overview of 21st Century Jazz Music. In the article, fellow drummer and Grammy Award-winner Terri Lyne Carrington highlights Overall as one of her favorite artists of the new millennium. She describes him as a “pre-eminent style bender and blender, successfully juxtaposing genres through his production expertise and use of melodic and harmonic forms that deftly integrate the new with the old.”

== Discography ==
=== Studio albums ===
Title	Details
Go Get Ice Cream and Listen to Jazz	Released: January 11, 2019; Label: Self-released; Formats: LP, digital download
I Think I'm Good	Released: February 28, 2020; Label: Brownswood; Formats: CD, LP, digital download
Animals	Released: May 26, 2023; Label: Warp; Formats: CD, LP, digital download
Cream	Released: September 12, 2025; Label: Warp; Formats: CD, LP, digital download

=== Mixtapes ===
Title	Details
Shades of Flu	Released: May 20, 2020; Label: Self-released; Formats: Streaming
Shades of Flu 2	Released: April 2, 2021; Label: Self-released; Formats: Streaming
Shades 3	Released: February 3, 2023; Label: Self-released; Formats: Streaming
