= 4eva Us Neva Them =

Studio album by 42 Dugg
- Released: July 4, 2024
- Length: 57:59
- Label: 4PF; CMG; Interscope
- Producer: Akachi; Bobby Raps; Clement Sackey; DJ Moon; FlexOnTheBeat; Foreverolling; G1; GodBoyDinero; Grimlin; Hardknock; Helluva; HitmanAudio; Jon Got It; Julian Suleiman; Julien Anderson; Lala the DJ; Macnificent; Manzz; Marshak; MKMentality; Nami; RicoRunDat; RingT808ne; Roger Goodman; SauceByGuap; Smoke Beats; T9C; TM88; TooDope; Tymaz; Weeley; Wristy Boi

42 Dugg chronology
Last Ones Left (2022)	4eva Us Neva Them (2024)

Singles from 4eva Us Neva Them
- 1. "Win wit Us" Released: May 16, 2024; 2. "N.P.O." Released: June 25, 2024

Professional ratings
Review scores
Source	Rating
AllMusic	3/5 stars

4eva Us Neva Them is the debut studio album by American rapper 42 Dugg. It was released through 4 Pockets Full (4PF), Collective Music Group (CMG) and Interscope Records on July 4, 2024. The album features guest appearances from Meek Mill, Rylo Rodriguez, Sexyy Red, Blac Youngsta, EST Gee, Jeezy, and Lil Baby. Production was handled by Bobby Raps, TM88, and Helluva, among others. The album sees 42 Dugg being introspective as he reflects on his legal issues and the time he spent in prison the previous year.

== Release and promotion ==
On May 16, 2024, 42 Dugg released the lead single of the album, "Win wit Us", where he announced the album and its original release of June 7. On June 25, he released the second single, "N.P.O.", which features fellow American rapper Sexyy Red. He revealed the tracklist of the album on July 3, the day before its release.

== Track listing ==
4eva Us Neva Dem track listing
No.	Title	Writer(s)	Producer(s)	Length
1.	"Intro"	Dion Hayes; Jeuan Tabarrejo; Clement Sackey; Red Rosamond; Khaya Gilika	G1; Sackey	3:16
2.	"Win Wit Us"	Hayes; Aaron Butler; Oscar Garcia; Marcos Antonana	Tymaz; FlexOnTheBeat; Marshak	2:37
3.	"4x4" (featuring Meek Mill)	Hayes; Robert Williams; Robert Richardson; Lesidney Ragland; Jeffrey Jones, Jr.; Victor Rosas	Bobby Raps; TooDope; Foreverolling; Grimlin	2:59
4.	"Fresh from the Feds"	Hayes; Yan Zhanovich; Aleksandr Andreevich; Brian Saadeh; Gilika	Weeley; Wristy Boi	3:02
5.	"Case Closed" (featuring Rylo Rodriguez)	Hayes; Ryan Adams; Victor Lassila; Andreevich	Hardknock; Wristy Boi	2:19
6.	"Wrong Right"	Hayes; J. Jones; Kevin da Silva; Kameron Johnson	Foreverolling; RicoRunDat	2:43
7.	"N.P.O." (featuring Sexyy Red)	Hayes; Janae Wherry; Tabarrejo; Thomas Crimeni; Dylan Teixeira; Gilika	G1; T9C; Nami	2:58
8.	"If I Can't"	Hayes; Butler; Garcia	Tymaz; FlexOnTheBeat	1:54
9.	"Megan" (featuring Blac Youngsta)	Hayes; Sammie Benson; Gregory Sanders, Jr.; Julien Anderson	HitmanAudio; Anderson	2:35
10.	"Org"	Hayes; Sanders; Anderson	HitmanAudio; Anderson	2:45
11.	"Catch 1"	Hayes; Sanders; Anderson	HitmanAudio; Anderson	2:49
12.	"My Mama"	Hayes; Daniela Voznesensky; Kenenbaev Meder	Lala the DJ; MKMentality	2:44
13.	"Since When" (featuring EST Gee)	Hayes; George Stone III; John Ramirez; Mani Khodabakhsh; Nikita Kardash	Jon Got It; Manzz; SauceByGuap	3:02
14.	"Get in Your Bag"	Hayes; Butler; Garcia; J. Jones	Tymaz; FlexOnTheBeat; Foreverolling	2:01
15.	"BMF" (featuring Jeezy)	Hayes; Jay Jenkins; Styrean Lee	Smoke Beats	2:35
16.	"Go Again Pt 2"	Hayes; J. Jones; Pavel Dolgov	Foreverolling; GodBoyDinero	4:14
17.	"No Love" (featuring Lil Baby)	Hayes; Dominique Jones; Bryan Simmons; Corey Moon; Hunter Brown; Kenneth Smith, Jr.	TM88; DJ Moon; Akachi; Macnificent	2:55
18.	"4eva Us Freestyle"	Hayes; Martin McCurtis	Helluva	2:11
19.	"Need You"	Hayes; Gilika; Voznesensky; Patrick Murphy	Lala the DJ; RingT808ne	3:17
20.	"Still Bout You"	Hayes; Sanders; Anderson	HitmanAudio; Anderson	2:43
21.	"Real Ones (Outro)"	Hayes; Roger Goodman; Julian Suleiman	Goodman; Suleiman	2:37
Total length:				57:59

== Charts ==
Chart performance for 4eva Us Neva Them
Chart (2024)	Peak position
US Billboard 200	76
US Top R&B/Hip-Hop Albums (Billboard)	24
