= Lori Harvey =

American model and socialite

- Born: January 13, 1997 (age 29); Memphis, Tennessee, U.S.
- Occupations: Socialite; model; entrepreneur
- Years active: 2015–present
- Father: Steve Harvey (adoptive)
- Modeling information
- Height: 1.59 m (5 ft 3 in)
- Hair color: Brown
- Eye color: Dark brown
- Agency: IMG (New York, Los Angeles)

Lori Harvey (born January 13, 1997) is an American socialite, model and entrepreneur. She is the daughter of Marjorie Harvey (née Bridges) and the adoptive daughter of comedian Steve Harvey. She was signed to IMG Models Management agency in the United States, as well as Select Model Management in Europe. In 2021, Harvey founded the skincare company SKN by LH. She has walked the runway for Dolce & Gabbana, and has starred in campaigns for Burberry and Michael Kors. Harvey is currently signed with IMG Models and WME.

== Early life ==
Lori Harvey was born January 13, 1997 in Memphis, Tennessee to Marjorie Bridges. In 2007, her mother married comedian Steve Harvey, who later adopted her. She grew up in Atlanta, Georgia. Harvey was a competitive equestrian, and aspired to compete at the Olympic Games. She later attended college in Florida, before dropping out due to an injury, which prevented her from continuing her work as an equestrian.

== Career ==
In 2015, she began a career in modeling, signing modeling contracts with LA Model Management agency in the United States, and Select Model Management in Europe. Harvey has walked the runway for Dolce & Gabbana's 2017 Spring/Summer collection; and has appeared in campaigns for Dolce & Gabbana, Michael Kors, Valentino, Pat McGrath's Beauty Lab, and Burberry. In 2019, Harvey made a cameo in the music video for "Motivation" by singer Normani. She has also been featured on the covers of Instagram's The Zine and Wonderland.

In 2021, she launched the skincare brand SKN by LH. That same year, she collaborated on a clothing collection with the company Naked Wardrobe. In May 2022, Harvey posted a video on TikTok explaining her weight loss, which included a daily 1200-Calorie diet leading up to the Met Gala. The video faced criticism from health experts who warned of the potential dangers that participating in the diet could cause someone. In June 2022, Kim Kardashian faced backlash after she announced the launch of a skincare line named SKKN by Kim, which some Twitter users felt was too similar to Harvey's company name. The following month, it was announced that Harvey signed a modeling contract with IMG Models and William Morris Endeavor (WME).

In 2023, Harvey co-starred in the music video for Usher's single "Glu". In August 2023, Harvey launched her swimwear brand Yevrah Swim.

In February 2024, it was announced that Harvey will star in Peacock's mini-series Fight Night: The Million Dollar Heist.

== Personal life ==
She has close friendships with Jordyn Woods, Normani, Winnie Harlow, and Ryan Destiny, according to Essence. In 2017, Harvey was presented to society at Le Bal des débutantes in Paris.

=== Relationships ===
In January 2016, she began dating Dutch soccer player Memphis Depay. They were engaged in June 2017 and separated by 2018.

Following the end of her engagement to Memphis, Harvey was briefly linked to R&B singer Trey Songz. In 2019, Harvey briefly dated Sean "P. Diddy" Combs. Later she was linked with the rapper Future; the pair confirmed their relationship in January 2020, and broke up in August of that year. Future later took aim at Harvey on his featured verse on the song "Maybach" by 42 Dugg, with the lyrics "Magic City, I'm the owner. Tell Steve Harvey, I don't want her".

In November 2020, Harvey began dating actor Michael B. Jordan. In June 2022, it was reported that the couple had ended their relationship.

In January 2023, Harvey confirmed that she was dating actor Damson Idris; the two broke up in November 2023, and remained friends until they began dating again in 2025.

=== Legal issues ===
In October 2019, Harvey was arrested for fleeing the scene of a collision, according to the Beverly Hills Police Department. In January 2020, a spokesperson from the Los Angeles County District Attorney's office confirmed to People, that she was charged with two misdemeanors, including one count of resisting, obstructing a police officer and one count of hit and run resulting in property damage. In December 2020, it was reported by TMZ, that she had accepted a plea deal, and was sentenced to two years of probation.

== Filmography ==
=== Television ===
Year	Title	Role	Notes
2024	Fight Night: The Million Dollar Heist	Lola Falana	Miniseries
2025	Reasonable Doubt	Chelsea	Recurring cast: season 3
