= Fight Night: The Million Dollar Heist =

American crime drama TV miniseries (2024)

- Promotional release poster
- Genre: Action; Crime drama
- Created by: Shaye Ogbonna
- Based on: Fight Night by: Jeff Keating; Jim Roberts
- Starring: Kevin Hart; Taraji P. Henson; Don Cheadle; Samuel L. Jackson; Terrence Howard
- Music by: Scott Bomar
- Country of origin: United States
- Original language: English
- No. of episodes: 8

Production
- Executive producers: Shaye Ogbonna; Jason Horwitch; Will Packer; Kevin Hart; Bryan Smiley; Mike Stein; Sabrina Wind; Craig Brewer; Conal Byrne; Will Pearson; Carrie Lieberman; Jeff Keating; Lars Jacobson; Kenny Burns
- Running time: 40-53 minutes
- Production companies: HartBeat Productions; Will Packer Media; Universal Television

Original release
- Network: Peacock
- Release: September 5 – October 10, 2024

Fight Night: The Million Dollar Heist is an American crime drama television miniseries created by Shaye Ogbonna, based on the 2020 podcast of the same name fictionalizing an actual armed robbery, at an Atlanta party, on the night of Muhammad Ali's October 1970 comeback fight, after being stripped of his boxing license in 1967 for being a conscientious objector to fighting in the Vietnam War.

The limited series premiered on September 5, 2024, on Peacock with the first three episodes. It concluded with its eighth episode on October 10, 2024.

== Premise ==
The infamous story of how an armed robbery on the night of Muhammad Ali's historic 1970 comeback fight transformed Atlanta into the "Black Mecca."

== Cast ==
=== Main ===
- Kevin Hart as Gordon 'Chicken Man' Williams
- Taraji P. Henson as Vivian 'Sweets' Thomas
- Don Cheadle as Detective J.D. Hudson
- Samuel L. Jackson as Frank 'Black Godfather' Moten

=== Special guest star ===
- Terrence Howard as Richard 'Cadillac Richie' Wheeler

=== Guest ===
- Dexter Darden as Muhammad Ali
- Michael James Shaw as Lamar
- Atkins Estimond as Raymond 'Silky Brown' Armstrong
- Sam Adegoke as Emerson Dorsey
- Sinqua Walls as McKinley 'Mac' Rogers
- Myles Bullock as Willie Black
- Artrece Johnson as Faye Williams
- Lori Harvey as Lola Falana
- Marsha Stephanie Blake as Delores Hudson
- Jayson Warner Smith as Police Chief Herbert Turner Jenkins
- RonReaco Lee as Senator Leroy Johnson
- Teresa Celeste as Maxine
- Chloe Bailey as Lena Mosley
- Melvin Gregg as Andre Muse
- Jalyn Hall as Baby Ray
- Justen Ross as Tommy Hayes
- Terrence Terrell as Boone Davis
- Ben Vandermey as Detective Mason
- Jeff Sprauve as Romel
- Alan Heckner as Colt
- Parker Sack as Paul Gleason
- Clifton Powell as Mushmouth Rowe
- David Banner as Missouri Slim
- Exie Booker as Derrick 'Tex' Patterson
- Dammon Earl Hughes as Bunker Willis
- Celestino Cornielle as Javier 'Javi' Lopez
- Rockmond Dunbar as Uncle Willie
- Rayan Lawrence as Melvin

== Episodes ==
No.	Title	Directed by	Written by	Original release date	Prod. code	U.S. viewers (millions)
1	"Round One: The Ballad of Chicken Man"	Craig Brewer	Shaye Ogbonna	September 5, 2024	TBA	N/A
2	"Round Two: Fight Night"	Craig Brewer	Shaye Ogbonna	September 5, 2024	TBA	N/A
3	"Round Three: Black Vegas"	Tanya Hamilton	Erika L. Johnson	September 5, 2024	TBA	N/A
4	"Round Four: Real Policework"	Tanya Hamilton	Jon Dorsey	September 12, 2024	TBA	N/A
5	"Round Five: Ambition Ain't Free"	Carl Seaton	Lauren Andrea Glover	September 19, 2024	TBA	N/A
6	"Round Six: Community Men"	Carl Seaton	Maxwell Michael Towson	September 26, 2024	TBA	N/A
7	"Round Seven: Jekyll Island"	Craig Brewer	Story by : Jason Horwitch; Teleplay by : Jason Horwitch & Erika L. Johnson	October 3, 2024	TBA	N/A
8	"Round Eight: Testify"	Craig Brewer	Story by : Shaye Ogbonna & William Yu; Teleplay by : Shaye Ogbonna	October 10, 2024	TBA	N/A

== Production ==
It was announced in December 2023 that Kevin Hart was set to star in and executive produce the series, which Peacock had greenlit in a straight to series order. Samuel L. Jackson, Terrence Howard, Dexter Darden and Taraji P. Henson were added to the cast in January 2024, while Craig Brewer was hired to direct the first and last two episodes. Myles Bullock, Don Cheadle, Chloe Bailey, Melvin Gregg, Artrece Johnson, Jalyn Hall, Clifton Powell, Lori Harvey and Marsha Stephanie Blake were added to the cast in February 2024. In March, Rockmond Dunbar joined the cast.

Filming began on February 12, 2024, in Atlanta.

The series reunites Taraji P. Henson with Kevin Hart after co-starring with him in Think Like a Man, Think Like a Man Too, and Top Five, and is Henson's third collaboration with Terrence Howard, whom she had previously collaborated with in Hustle & Flow and the series Empire. The series also reunites Howard and Cheadle, who co-starred in the 2005 film Crash.

== Reception ==
On the review aggregator website Rotten Tomatoes, 96% of 23 critics' reviews are positive, with an average rating of 7.2/10. The website's consensus reads: "Skillfully weaving an inflection point in Black culture into a rollicking heist story, Fight Night is punchy entertainment with a never-better Kevin Hart broadening his dramatic range." Metacritic, which uses a weighted average, assigned the film a score of 72 out of 100, based on 15 critics, indicating "generally favorable" reviews.
