= Free Dem Boyz =

Mixtape by 42 Dugg
- Released: May 21, 2021
- Length: 49:03
- Label: 4PF; CMG; Interscope
- Producer: 808Melo; Antt Beatz; Carlo Anthony; Chosen 1; DaBoyDame; DJ Swift; DMacTooBangin; Einer Bankz; Flex OTB; Foreverolling; G1; G Koop; Helluva; HitmanAudio; ItsLrz; Monique Winning; Mook on the Beat; Murda Beatz; Nash Beats; Nick Papz; Noah Pettigrew; OkTanner; Pooh Beatz; Rio Leyva; Ry Louis; Sacaii; Section 8; StoopKid; TayTayMadeIt; Taz Taylor; Too Dope; Turbo; TyMaz; TyyMachine; Veno the Builder; WristyBoi; Woodpecker; Xander; Yung Dee; Yung Talent

42 Dugg chronology
Young & Turnt 2 (2020)	Free Dem Boyz (2021)	Last Ones Left (2022)

Singles from Free Dem Boyz
- 1. "Free Merey" Released: August 21, 2020; 2. "Free Woo" Released: November 6, 2020; 3. "Free Me" Released: November 26, 2020; 4. "4 Da Gang" Released: April 2, 2021; 5. "Maybach" Released: May 21, 2021

Professional ratings
Review scores
Source	Rating
AllMusic	2.5/5 stars

Free Dem Boyz is the fourth mixtape by American rapper 42 Dugg. It was released on May 21, 2021, by 4 Pockets Full (4PF), Collective Music Group (CMG) and Interscope Records. The mixtape features guest appearances from Roddy Ricch, Future, Lil Durk, Rylo Rodriguez, EST Gee, Fivio Foreign, and Rowdy Rebel. Executive produced by rappers and label heads Lil Baby and Yo Gotti, record producers who contributed to the mixtape consist of TayTayMadeIt, DJ Swift, Helluva, Einer Bankz, Section 8, AnttBeatz, TyyMachine, Carlo Anthony, 808Melo, Taz Taylor, Murda Beatz, Pooh Beatz, Flex OTB, and more. The title of the mixtape refers to pleading for 42 Dugg's friends and family who are currently incarcerated to be freed from jail or prison.

== Background ==
The mixtape is a tribute to the people that 42 Dugg knows who are serving time in jail or prison, and those who are dead. Every song from Free Dem Boyz is a tribute to them, even the "uptempo songs". The cover of the mixtape features the names of his friends and family that were locked up at the time, such as MD, Mery, Onte, Rico, Skeet, Nell, Dirt, Wild, KWE, and Dunk.

== Release and promotion ==
On May 13, 2021, 42 Dugg revealed the cover art and title of the mixtape. He revealed the release date on May 17, 2021. The following day, he posted a list of the guest artists on the mixtape, while also putting a pre-order link on Apple Music with the complete track listing.

== Singles ==
42 Dugg released the mixtape's lead single, "Free Merey", on August 21, 2020. "Free Woo" was released as the second single on November 6, 2020. He released the third single, "Free Me" on November 26, 2020. The fourth single, "4 Da Gang", a collaboration with fellow American rapper Roddy Ricch, was released on April 2, 2021. The fifth single, "Maybach", featuring fellow American rapper Future, was released along with the mixtape on May 21, 2021.

== Commercial performance ==
During the chart week of May 29, 2021, Free Dem Boyz debuted at number eight on the Billboard 200, making 42 Dugg's highest-charting project.

== Track listing ==
Free Dem Boyz track listing
No.	Title	Writer(s)	Producer(s)	Length
1.	"Intro"	Dion Hayes; Tavian Carter	TayTayMadeIt	1:51
2.	"Turnest Nigga in the City"	Hayes; Damion Williams	DJ Swift	2:27
3.	"We Know"	Hayes; Martin McCurtis	Helluva	2:13
4.	"4 Da Gang" (with Roddy Ricch)	Hayes; Rodrick Moore Jr.; Carter; Klaus Meine; Rudolf Schenker	TayTayMadeIt	2:36
5.	"Maybach" (featuring Future)	Hayes; Nayvadius Wilburn; Darius Henry; Jeuan Tabarrejo; Gorelov Aleksandrovich; Damien Aubrey; Robert Mandell	Yung Dee; G1; Chosen 1; DaBoyDame; G Koop	3:19
6.	"Bestfriends"	Hayes; Einer Bankz; David McDowell	Bankz; DMacTooBangin	2:12
7.	"Alone" (featuring Lil Durk)	Hayes; Durk Banks; Rai'Shaun Williams; Noah Pettigrew	Section 8; Pettigrew	3:46
8.	"Still Miss My Niggas" (featuring Rylo Rodriguez)	Hayes; Ryan Adams; Ceary Houston	Veno the Builder	2:58
9.	"Free Merey"	Hayes; Carter	TayTayMadeIt	2:20
10.	"Quez Free"	Hayes; Anthony Mathis	Antt Beatz	2:10
11.	"Please"	Hayes; Aleksandr Poroshin; Monique Diamond; Tyler McCann	WristyBoi; Monique Winning; TyyMachine	2:06
12.	"Rose Gold" (featuring EST Gee)	Hayes; George Stone III; Carlo Coxen II	Carlo Anthony	3:05
13.	"Judge Please"	Hayes; D. Williams; Brayon Nelson	DJ Swift; Mook on the Beat	2:03
14.	"Still Catching Cases" (featuring Fivio Foreign and Rowdy Rebel)	Hayes; Maxie Ryles III; Chad Marshall; Andre Loblack	808Melo	2:53
15.	"It Get Deeper Pt. 2"	Hayes; Danny Snodgrass Jr.; Rio Leyva; Tanner Katich; Nathan Lamarche	Taz Taylor; Leyva; OkTanner; Nash Beats	3:41
16.	"And I Gangbang"	Hayes; Shane Lindstrom; Darryl Clemons; Bryan Williams; Byron Thomas	Murda Beatz; Pooh Beatz	2:13
17.	"Free Woo"	Hayes; Aaron Butler	Flex OTB	2:26
18.	"Free Skeet"	Hayes; Ry Louis	Louis	2:09
19.	"Free Me"	Hayes; Mathis	Antt Beatz	2:28
Total length:				49:03

Deluxe edition
No.	Title	Writer(s)	Producer(s)	Length
20.	"Free Dem Boyz, Pt. 2"	Hayes; R. Williams; Levi de Jong	Section 8; Woodpecker	2:18
21.	"Freshman of the Year"	Hayes; Chandler Durham; Camren Martin; Aidan Barrett	Turbo; Yung Talent; Sacaii	2:36
22.	"Free RIC" (with Lil Durk)	Hayes; Banks; Jeffrey Jones Jr.; Butler; Lesidney Ragland; Oscar Garcia	Foreverolling; Flex OTB; Too Dope; TyMaz	2:25
23.	"Real Niggas Never Die" (featuring Arabian McWilson)	Hayes; McWilson; Mathis	Antt Beatz	3:12
24.	"On Tank"	Hayes; Nikolas Papamitrou; Alexander Papamitrou	Nick Papz; Xander	2:48
25.	"On My Son" (featuring Moneybagg Yo)	Hayes; DeMario White Jr.; McCann; Lorenzo Vela	TyyMachine; ItsLrz	3:02
26.	"Opp Pack" (featuring Nardo Wick)	Hayes; Horace Walls III; Gregory Sanders Jr.; Elijah Ohiri	HitmanAudio; StoopKid	4:13
Total length:				81:28

== Personnel ==
=== Musicians ===
- 42 Dugg – primary artist (all tracks)
- Roddy Ricch – primary artist (track 4)
- Future – featured artist (track 5)
- Lil Durk – featured artist (tracks 7, 22)
- Rylo Rodriguez – featured artist (track 8)
- EST Gee – featured artist (track 12)
- Fivio Foreign – featured artist (track 14)
- Rowdy Rebel – featured artist (track 14)
- Arabian McWilson – featured artist (track 23)
- Moneybagg Yo – featured artist (track 25)
- Nardo Wick – featured artist (track 26)

=== Technical ===
- Khaya "Macxsn" Gilika – engineering (tracks 1–6, 8, 9), mixing (track 2, 21, 24), recording (tracks 10, 14, 16), studio personnel (tracks 1–6, 8–12, 14–19, 21, 24)
- Leo Goff – mixing (tracks 1, 3, 7, 9, 12–14, 18, 20, 22–23, 26), mastering (tracks 6, 10, 14, 16), studio personnel (tracks 1, 3, 6, 7, 9, 10, 12–14, 16, 18, 20, 22–23, 26)
- Helluva – engineering (track 3), studio personnel (track 3)
- Chris Dennis – engineering (track 4), studio personnel (track 4)
- Derek Ali – mixing (track 4), studio personnel (track 4)
- Chris Athens – mastering (track 4), studio personnel (track 4)
- Julien Suleiman – engineering (track 5), studio personnel (track 5)
- Ari Morris – mixing (tracks 5, 6, 8, 11, 15–17, 19, 25), studio personnel (tracks 5, 6, 8, 11, 15–17, 19, 25)
- Matthew "Mattazik Muzik" Robinson – engineering (track 7), studio personnel (track 7)
- Antt Beatz – mixing (track 10), recording (track 7), studio personnel (track 10)
- Logan Schmitz – assistant mixing (track 17), studio personnel (track 17)

== Charts ==
=== Weekly charts ===
Weekly chart performance for Free Dem Boyz
Chart (2021)	Peak position
Canadian Albums (Billboard)	36
US Billboard 200	8
US Top R&B/Hip-Hop Albums (Billboard)	4

=== Year-end charts ===
Year-end chart performance for Free Dem Boyz
Chart (2021)	Position
US Billboard 200	144
US Top R&B/Hip-Hop Albums (Billboard)	56
