= I Aint Feeling You =

Studio album by EST Gee
- Released: January 31, 2025
- Length: 41:25
- Labels: Interscope; CMG
- Producers: 1AllBlack; Al Geno; CantRushTheVibe; DamnATP!; Dxntemadeit; Foreverolling; Jay Rich; Johngotitt; JP the Avant; JP Tracks; June James; Keyman; Manzz; Marko Lenz; Marshak; Mattazik Musik; Project X; Royal Ron; Rxch; Sheffmade; Slade Hearts; Sid; Tapekid; TM88; Yakree

EST Gee chronology
El Toro 2 (2023)	I Aint Feeling You (2025)	My World (2025)

Singles from I Aint Feeling You
- 1. "Go" Released: November 19, 2024; 2. "The Streets" Released: November 27, 2024; 3. "RIP Lu Mike" Released: December 13, 2024; 4. "My Love" Released: January 8, 2025

I Aint Feeling You ratings
Review scores
Source	Rating
3.5/5 stars	

I Aint Feeling You is the second studio album by American rapper EST Gee. It was released through Interscope Records and Collective Music Group on January 31, 2025. The album features guest appearances from Lil Baby, Travis Scott, Veeze, and Rylo Rodriguez. The bonus edition with four additional tracks was released six days later. It contains an additional guest appearance from BloodHound Q50.

== Background ==
On February 7, 2025, EST Gee spoke about what the title of the album means and when he recorded it in an interview with Billboard:

Anybody that ain't feeling me. [...] I been had it for six months. I like to record in little pockets. Whatever comes out of the pocket, that's the project. That was probably like a two-week thing. I probably went to the studio six or seven times.

The album came in the wake of the shooting deaths of Gee's manager, EST Big Beach, and his protégé EST Lu Mike. The latter is eulogized in the album track "RIP Lu Mike".

== Release and promotion ==
On January 14, 2025, EST Gee announced the album along with its title and release date. Ten days later, he posted a snippet of the song "Houstatlantaville" through a video of him in a recording studio with Travis Scott, in which he announced that the latter and Lil Baby would both be featured on the song. He revealed the tracklist on January 29, 2025.

=== Singles ===
The lead single of the album, "Go", was released on November 19, 2024. It was followed up with the second single, "The Streets", which was released eight days later. The third single, "RIP Lu Mike", was released on December 13, 2024. The fourth and final single, "My Love", which is a collaboration with fellow American rapper Veeze that features fellow American rapper Rylo Rodriguez was released on January 8, 2025.

== Track listing ==
I Aint Feeling You track listing
No.	Title	Writer(s)	Producer(s)	Length
1.	"Free Rico"	George Stone III; John Ramirez; Jack Thierer; Mani Khodabakhsh	Johngotitt; Yakree; Manzz	2:33
2.	"The Streets"	Stone; June James	James	3:00
3.	"Houstatlantaville" (featuring Lil Baby and Travis Scott)	Stone; Dominique Jones; Jacques Webster II; Ramirez; John Moore; Donte Ononiewu	Johngotitt; JP the Avant; Dxntemadeit; Mattazik Musik	3:25
4.	"Right Now"	Stone; Ramirez; Jeffrey Jones	Johngotitt; Foreverolling	2:25
5.	"RIP Lu Mike"	Stone; J. Jones; Mark Nikolaev	Foreverolling; Marko Lenz	2:48
6.	"Go"	Stone; Grant Hackett; James Price; Randy Razz II	Rxch; Sheffmade; CantRushTheVibe	2:06
7.	"Plug Motivation"	Stone; Jay Jenkins; Max Jacobsson; Demetrius Stewart; Ramirez; J. Jones	Johngotitt; Foreverolling	2:08
8.	"Do My Own Stunts"	Stone; Darryl Richardson III; Donnell Prince; Lawrence Edwards; Jamal Glaze; Ramirez; Jacobsson	Johngotitt; Moz	2:30
9.	"Crash"	Stone; Bryan Simmons; Sidney Tapaquon; Malik Hargis; Xavier Barrios	TM88; Sid; Slade Hearts; Project X	3:19
10.	"Slime"	Stone; J. Jones; Levin Buhtz	Johngotitt; Tapekid	2:45
11.	"My Love" (with Veeze featuring Rylo Rodriguez)	Stone; Karon Vantrees; Ryan Adams; Richard DeBerry; Ronald Roper, Jr.; Jonathan Pritchard; Hunter Sallis	Royal Ron; Jay Rich; JP Tracks; Keyman	3:19
12.	"Outro"	Stone; Tauheed Epps; Earl Conyers; Dwayne Carter, Jr.; Joshua Banks; Ramirez; J. Jones; Jacobsson; Eeti Erätuli	Al Geno; Marshak; 1AllBlack	2:50
Total length:				33:14

Bonus tracks
No.	Title	Writer(s)	Producer(s)	Length
13.	"Flash" (with BloodHound Q50)	Stone; Mi'kquale Cooper; Kanye West; Ramirez; Jacobsson	Johngotitt; Foreverolling	2:41
14.	"Free Z5"	Stone; J. Jones; Nikolaev; Arda Turel; Kameron Johnson	Foreverolling; Marko Lenz; DamnATP!	2:36
15.	"Free Leaf"	Stone; J. Jones	Foreverolling	1:27
16.	"It Aint Work Yet"	Stone; J. Jones	Foreverolling	1:24
Total length:				41:25

== Charts ==
Chart performance for I Aint Feeling You
Chart (2025)	Peak position
US Billboard 200	97
US Top R&B/Hip-Hop Albums (Billboard)	34
