= Lick Back =

2021 single by EST Gee

Single by EST Gee

from the album Bigger Than Life or Death
- Released: April 16, 2021
- Genre: Hip hop; Trap
- Length: 1:33
- Label: CMG; Warlike; Interscope
- Songwriters: George Stone III; Jeffrey Jones; Lucas DePante
- Producers: ForeveRolling; Juke Wong

EST Gee singles chronology
"Real as It Gets" (2021)	"Lick Back" (2021)	"Catch a Body" (2021)

Music video
- "Lick Back" on YouTube

"Lick Back" is a song by American rapper EST Gee, released on April 16, 2021, as his debut solo single and the lead single from his fifth mixtape Bigger Than Life or Death (2021). It was produced by ForeveRolling and Juke Wong. An official remix of the song features American rappers Future and Young Thug.

== Composition ==
Writing for HotNewHipHop, Alex Zidel described the song as a "statement that EST Gee is taking over and he's doing so on his own terms". The song sees EST Gee "keeping things very street and very straightforward".

== Music video ==
A music video was released alongside the single. It sees EST Gee and his crew riding through the streets of Houston, Texas in expensive cars, including a bright green Lamborghini Uru.

== Remix ==
The official remix of the song was released on July 21, 2021, from Bigger Than Life or Death. It features verses from rappers Future and Young Thug. The remix was positively received; Fred Thomas of AllMusic wrote that it finds EST Gee "at the height of his versatile powers, molding brazen bragging and smart threats into something unexpectedly hooky."

In an interview on The Breakfast Club, EST Gee said that Canadian rapper Drake was supposed to be on the remix as well, but was not available at the time.

== Charts ==
Chart performance for "Lick Back"
Chart (2021)	Peak position
US Billboard Hot 100	89
US Hot R&B/Hip-Hop Songs (Billboard)	32
