= Backstage Passes =

2022 single by EST Gee featuring Jack Harlow

Single by EST Gee featuring Jack Harlow

from the album I Never Felt Nun
- Released: October 11, 2022
- Length: 2:38
- Label: Interscope; CMG; Warlike
- Songwriters: George Stone III; Jackman Harlow; Darryl Clemons; Dejan Nikolic
- Producers: Pooh Beatz; Nik Dean

EST Gee singles chronology
| "On 10" (2022) | "Backstage Passes" (2022) |

Jack Harlow singles chronology
| "First Class" (2022) | "Backstage Passes" (2022) | "They Don't Love It" (2023) |

Music video
- "Backstage Passes" on YouTube

"Backstage Passes" is a song by American rapper EST Gee featuring fellow American rapper Jack Harlow, from the former's debut studio album I Never Felt Nun (2022). Produced by Pooh Beatz and Nik Dean, it was sent to rhythmic contemporary radio on October 11, 2022 as the fifth single from the album.

== Composition ==
The song sees EST Gee and Jack Harlow rapping about their prowess in their hometown of Louisville, Kentucky. The latter also mentions traveling to Cincinnati in his verse.

== Critical reception ==
Paul Attard of Slant Magazine wrote a favorable review of the song:

There's one guest spot on I Never Felt Nun that effectively offsets the album's relentless bravado: Jack Harlow, whose cheeky swagger on the minimal "Backstage Passes" serves as a nice foil to Gee's self-serious fulminating. The native Louisvillians trade off their accomplishments on the track's chorus—Gee made it famous for "turkey bags," while Harlow gave its residents a few Guinness-sized "big records"—with a laidback charisma, exhibiting a natural rapport that veers into boyish playfulness. It's not a terribly flashy collaboration, especially given how barebones the track's production remains, but it exemplifies I Never Felt Nun's workmanlike ethos. If only that approach had been applied to the album's editing.

== Music video ==
A music video for the song was released on September 16, 2022, alongside I Never Felt Nun. Directed by Cole Bennett, it opens with EST Gee and Jack Harlow sitting in a waiting room dressed in blue denim. The room shifts into a backdrop for a fitting session, matching the colors of the outfits that the rappers try on: red and white. Wearing the white outfits, Gee and Harlow step through a curtain and perform in front of a raucous crowd. At the end of the video, they return to the waiting room and the time for their appointment arrives.

== Charts ==
Chart performance for "Backstage Passes"
| Chart (2022–2023) | Peak position |
|---|---|
| New Zealand Hot Singles (RMNZ) | 23 |
| US Billboard Hot 100 | 98 |
| US Hot R&B/Hip-Hop Songs (Billboard) | 28 |
| US Rhythmic Airplay (Billboard) | 18 |
