= 5500 Degrees =

Song by EST Gee featuring Lil Baby, 42 Dugg and Rylo Rodriguez

Song by EST Gee featuring Lil Baby, 42 Dugg and Rylo Rodriguez

from the album Bigger Than Life or Death
- Released: July 21, 2021
- Genre: Hip Hop
- Length: 3:04
- Label: CMG; Warlike; Interscope
- Songwriters: George Stone III; Dominique Jones; Dion Hayes; Ryan Adams; Marlon Brown, Jr.
- Producer: Enrgy Beats

Music video
- "5500 Degrees" on YouTube

"5500 Degrees" is a song by American rapper EST Gee from his fifth mixtape Bigger Than Life or Death (2021). The song features American rappers Lil Baby, 42 Dugg and Rylo Rodriguez. It was produced by Enrgy Beats.

== Composition ==
The song sees the rappers "deliver boastful bars" over a sample of "400 Degreez" by rapper Juvenile. In particular, Lil Baby proclaims himself as the Lil Wayne of the current hip hop generation.

== Critical reception ==
The song received generally favorable reviews; Lil Baby's verse was particularly well received by critics. Writing for Uproxx, Caitlin White commented, "All the rappers deliver on their verses, but Lil Baby's final, rapid-fire effort is definitely worth sticking around for." Mitch Findlay of HotNewHipHop wrote, "Though Lil Baby certainly has the edge in that department being a superstar and all, that doesn't stop the other three from bringing their A-game."

== Music video ==
The official music video was directed by Diesel Films and released on August 11, 2021. It shows the four artists in a white room filled with luxury cars and motorbikes, showing their stacks of money and in the company of their crews.

== Charts ==
Chart performance for "5500 Degrees"
Chart (2021)	Peak position
US Billboard Hot 100	92
US Hot R&B/Hip-Hop Songs (Billboard)	34

== Certifications ==
Region	Certification	Certified units/sales
United States (RIAA)	Platinum	1,000,000^{‡}
^{‡} Sales+streaming figures based on certification alone.
