= Grace (Lil Baby and 42 Dugg song) =

2020 song by Lil Baby and 42 Dugg

Song by Lil Baby and 42 Dugg

from the album My Turn
- Released: February 28, 2020
- Genre: Trap
- Length: 3:23
- Label: Capitol; Motown; Wolfpack; Quality Control
- Songwriters: Dominique Jones; Dion Hayes; Zachary Thomas
- Producer: Budda Beats

Music video
- "Grace" on YouTube

"Grace" (originally known as "Government Name") is a song by American rappers Lil Baby and 42 Dugg. The track was released on February 28, 2020, as the fourth track off of Baby's album My Turn. Along with "We Paid", which is on the deluxe version of the album, it is one of two tracks on the album to include 42 Dugg. The track features back to back verses from the main performers layered on an ambient trap beat.

== Music video ==
The music video for the track was released on March 13, 2020, three days after 42 Dugg was arrested on federal gun charges. It has over 90 million views as of January 2021. The video was directed by Jon J.

== Critical reception ==
Josh Svetz of HipHopDX called the track "dull" and called 42 Dugg's feature "toothless". However, Danny Schwartz of Rolling Stone said the track's "fresh production ideas inject life into the album".

== Commercial performance ==
The track debuted at number 48 on the Billboard Hot 100, earning 42 Dugg his first charting single. The song has since gone 2× Platinum and has garnered over 110 million views on YouTube.

== Charts ==
=== Weekly charts ===
Chart (2020)	Peak position
US Billboard Hot 100	48
US Hot R&B/Hip-Hop Songs (Billboard)	23
US Rolling Stone Top 100	17

=== Year-end charts ===
Chart (2020)	Position
US Hot R&B/Hip-Hop Songs (Billboard)	95
