= I Never Felt Nun =

Studio album by EST Gee
- Released: September 16, 2022
- Genre: Hip-hop
- Length: 55:12
- Label: Interscope; CMG; Warlike
- Producer: 1AllBlack; 100Bands; Al Geno; Amosxght; BeazyTymes; Brookbeatz; CantRushTheVibe; Chosen 1; Doc Playboi; Flex; Foreverolling; Genie; GodBoyDinero; Higherrside; Indyah; JB Sauced Up; Johngotitt; Kam Johnson; KutOff; Marko Lenz; Marshak; Mfoss; Moon; Money Every; Nigel Talley; Nik Dean; Pooh Beatz; Popdatoli; Rizzo; Syk Sense; Tatchy; Tilt; Too Dope; TP808; Tymaz; Westen Weiss; Wyatt Cole; Young Cutta

EST Gee chronology
Last Ones Left (2022)	I Never Felt Nun (2022)	Mad (2023)

Singles from I Never Felt Nun
- 1. "Blood" Released: July 29, 2022; 2. "Love Is Blind" Released: August 12, 2022; 3. "Hell" Released: September 1, 2022; 4. "Shoot It Myself" Released: September 9, 2022; 5. "Backstage Passes" Released: October 11, 2022

I Never Felt Nun is the debut studio album by American rapper EST Gee. It was released through Interscope Records, Collective Music Group, and Warlike on September 16, 2022. The album features guest appearances from Future, Jack Harlow, Bryson Tiller, Machine Gun Kelly, and Jeezy.

== Background ==
The day the album was released, EST Gee spoke about it in an interview with Apple Music DJ Zane Lowe:

I don't want to put my beliefs, my feelings off on other people, but just, you got to stay motivated. 'Cause a lot of time it don't seem like it get better. You know what I'm saying? But you got to make it better. So that feeling of not feeling nothing... You know what I'm saying? That shit's basically just keep going through it, don't let it affect you. Before I knew to tell myself, that's how I really was. You know what I'm saying? So that's just what that album's about.

== Release and promotion ==
On September 6, 2022, EST Gee announced the album along with its title and release date. The next day, he revealed the tracklist, which had all the featured artists unannounced. The day after that, the features were announced in a new format of the tracklist that he posted in collaboration with Spotify hip-hop playlist RapCaviar.

=== Singles ===
The lead single of the album, "Blood", was released on July 29, 2022. It was followed up with the second single, "Love Is Blind", which was released on August 12, 2022. The third single, "Hell", was released on September 1, 2022. The fourth single, "Shoot It Myself", which features fellow American rapper Future, was released on September 9, 2022. The fifth and final single, "Backstage Passes", which features fellow American rapper Jack Harlow, was sent to US rhythmic contemporary radio on October 11, 2022.

== Critical reception ==
I Never Felt Nun ratings
Review scores
Source	Rating
AllMusic	3.5/5 stars
Pitchfork	7.3/10
RapReviews	7/10
Slant Magazine	3/5 stars

I Never Felt Nun received generally positive reviews from music critics. AllMusic wrote, "Louisville rapper EST Gee brings his imposing presence, trauma-fixated lyricism, and deft ability to navigate a hard beat to his debut studio album." Nadine Smith of Pitchfork wrote, "Though rap has reached vast new emotional depths in the last decade, Gee's confessionals are still startling in how bluntly they address the demons head-on. EST Gee's lyricism doesn't bring the catharsis of a therapy session or the removed vantage point of hindsight; I Never Felt Nun comes straight from the heart, hardened like armor." Paul Attard of Slant was slightly more mixed, writing, "The title of Gee's first studio album indicates his continuing disassociation from his emotions."

== Track listing ==
I Never Felt Nun track listing
No.	Title	Writer(s)	Producer(s)	Length
1.	"Have Mercy"	George Stone III; John Ramirez; Max Wonnenberg; Dominik Breitinger	Johngotitt; Rizzo; 100Bands	2:38
2.	"Shoot It Myself" (featuring Future)	Stone; Nayvadius Wilburn; Westen Weiss; Jawan Shelton	Weiss; BeazyTymes	3:08
3.	"Hell"	Stone; Tiquon Pryor; Elijah Gull; Gorelov Aleksandorovich	TP808; Chosen 1; Doc Playboi	2:19
4.	"Come Home"	Stone; Ramirez; Jeffrey Jones	Johngotitt; Foreverolling; Tilt	2:47
5.	"I Can't Feel a Thing"	Stone; Ramirez; Oliver Spencer; Amr Mohamed	Johngotitt; Popdatoli; Amosxght	3:02
6.	"Backstage Passes" (featuring Jack Harlow)	Stone; Jackman Harlow; Darryl Clemons; Dejan Nikolic	Pooh Beatz; Nik Dean	2:38
7.	"Both Arms"	Stone; Henry Lotas-Sherratt; Wyatt Cole Fancher	Young Cutta; Wyatt Cole	3:02
8.	"Bow and Say Grace"	Stone; Jones; Mark Nikolaev; Mamaev Andreevich	Foreverolling; Marko Lenz; Brookbeatz	2:30
9.	"Blood"	Stone; Al Johnson; Táta Vega; Ryan O'Neil; Jones	Money Every; Foreverolling	2:35
10.	"Is Heaven for a Gangsta"	Stone; Ramirez; Jacob Hagemann; Roshan Rayat; Randy Razz II	Johngotitt; KutOff; Genie; CantRushTheVibe	2:36
11.	"Love Is Blind"	Stone; Jones; Nikolaev	Foreverolling; Marko Lenz	2:37
12.	"X"	Stone; Gene Hixon; Marcos Antonanas; Aissa Robles	Al Geno; Marshak; 1AllBlack	2:57
13.	"Get Em' Geeski"	Stone; Ramirez; Wonnenberg; Paul Bofinger	Johngotitt; Rizzo; Tatchy	2:59
14.	"Sabotage" (featuring Bryson Tiller)	Stone; Bryson Tiller; Dalvin DeGrate; Meli'sa Morgan; Shirley Murdock; Attala Giles; Kevin Dorsey; Eddie Fluellen; Joshua Scruggs	Syk Sense	2:48
15.	"Double Back"	Stone; Jones; Aaron Butler; Jeremy Bradley	Foreverolling; Flex; JB Sauced Up	2:31
16.	"I Won't Let Em' Kill Me"	Stone; Jones; Lesidney Ragland; Corey Moon; Pavel Dolgov; Vikentsi Kudrautsau	Foreverolling; Too Dope; Moon; GodBoyDinero; Higherrside	2:15
17.	"Death Around the Corner" (featuring Machine Gun Kelly)	Stone; Colson Baker; Jones; Mikado Andersen; Oscar Garcia	Foreverolling; Mfoss; Tymaz	2:43
18.	"Get It Going"	Stone; Jones; Nikolaev; Antonanas	Foreverolling; Marko Lenz; Marshak	1:28
19.	"Voices in My Head"	Stone; Ramirez; Indyah McAlister; Liam McAlister; Vincent Charette	Johngotitt; Indyah; Tilt	2:22
20.	"Foreva"	Stone; Ramirez; Razz; Charette	Johngotitt; CantRushTheVibe; Tilt	2:10
21.	"The Realest" (featuring Jeezy)	Stone; Jay Jenkins; Jones; O'Neal; Kameron Johnson; Nigel Talley	Foreverolling; Money Every; Kam Johnson; Talley	3:15
Total length:				55:12

== Charts ==
Chart performance for I Never Felt Nun
Chart (2022)	Peak position
US Billboard 200	8
US Top R&B/Hip-Hop Albums (Billboard)	3
