= Real as It Gets =

2021 single by Lil Baby featuring EST Gee

Single by Lil Baby featuring EST Gee
- Released: March 4, 2021
- Genre: Hip hop; trap
- Length: 3:12
- Label: Quality Control; Motown
- Songwriters: Dominique Jones; George Stone III; Jacob Canady; Dwan Avery
- Producers: ATL Jacob; DY Krazy

Lil Baby singles chronology
"Ugly" (2021)	"Real as It Gets" (2021)	"Ramen & OJ" (2021)

EST Gee singles chronology
"Special Remix" (2020)	"Real as It Gets" (2021)	"Lick Back" (2021)

Music video
- "Real As It Gets" on YouTube

"Real as It Gets" is a song by American rapper Lil Baby, featuring vocals from fellow American rapper EST Gee. The song was produced by ATL Jacob and DY Krazy, who wrote the song along with the two artists.

== Background and composition ==
"Real As It Gets" was initially teased on Instagram Live. On February 23, 2021, Lil Baby announced that he would be releasing a collaboration with EST Gee soon.

Lyrically, the song is about the streets and the "current rockstar lifestyles" of Lil Baby and EST Gee. They rap about their influence on the new generation of hip hop and how people around them are proud of them. In the chorus, Lil Baby sing-raps: "I been savin' my guala, I ain't savin' no bitch / I had put down my Glock, but I picked up a stick / Don't get in hatin' shit, I'm on some greatest shit / My people proud, I'm as real as it gets".

== Critical reception ==
Tom Breihan of Stereogum called the song a "simple, hypnotic declaration of dominance." He also wrote that EST Gee's "punchier style contrasts nicely with Lil Baby's melodic float. Baby delivers his lyrics with fast fluidity, but he makes them sound like a chant or an incantation. The song itself doesn't exactly stand out in Baby's catalog, but it's an effective piece of work." Jordan Darville of The Fader wrote that the melody of the song is "menacing in a way that recalls underground Detroit hip-hop, and Baby keeps up the vibe with breathless bars full of threats and flexes", and that the hook is "particularly killer, too."

== Music video ==
The official music video was released along with the song March 4, 2021, and directed by Caleb Jermale. In it, Lil Baby "returns to the trenches and celebrates his wins with those that were there before the fame." He and EST Gee hang out in a neighborhood, taking pictures with fans, and count up their money. The rappers also show their jewelry and cruise in sports cars. At one point, someone asks about shooting another scene, to which Baby replies, "We finna shoot it right here."

== Charts ==
Chart performance for "Real as It Gets"
Chart (2021)	Peak position
Canada Hot 100 (Billboard)	52
US Billboard Hot 100	34
US Hot R&B/Hip-Hop Songs (Billboard)	17

== Certifications ==
Region	Certification	Certified units/sales
United States (RIAA)	Platinum	1,000,000^{‡}
^{‡} Sales+streaming figures based on certification alone.
