= 4 Da Gang =

2021 single by 42 Dugg and Roddy Ricch

Single by 42 Dugg and Roddy Ricch

from the album Free Dem Boyz
- Released: April 2, 2021
- Genre: Hip hop; rap rock
- Length: 2:35
- Label: 4PF; Collective; Interscope
- Songwriters: Dion Hayes; Rodrick Moore Jr.; Tavian Carter; Rudolf Schenker; Klaus Meine
- Producer: TayTayMadeIt

42 Dugg singles chronology
"Feel Like A Boss" (2021)	"4 Da Gang" (2021)	"Get Back" (2021)

Roddy Ricch singles chronology
"Heartless (Live from LA)" (2021)	"4 Da Gang" (2021)	"Stunnaman" (2021)

Music video
- "4 Da Gang" on YouTube

"4 Da Gang" is a song by American rappers 42 Dugg and Roddy Ricch. It was released on April 2, 2021, by 4 Pockets Full (4PF), Collective Music Group (CMG) and Interscope Records, as the fourth single from the former's fourth mixtape, Free Dem Boyz. The song was produced by TayTayMadeIt, and samples "No One Like You" by German rock band Scorpions.

== Background ==
Prior to the release of the song, a shooting occurred during the filming of the music video, leaving three people wounded. Neither of the rappers were harmed, and rapper OMB Peezy was later arrested for his connection to the shooting.

== Composition ==
The song features heavy guitar production, as well as trap drums in its instrumental. It sees 42 Dugg and Roddy Ricch rhyming about their lavish lives, such as cars and women, as well as their loyalty to their crews.

== Music video ==
The music video was released on April 29, 2021. It opens with Roddy Ricch being interrogated by police about 42 Dugg's whereabouts. When he refuses to give information, the agents go on a manhunt, but Dugg, who is hiding in a trailer at a junkyard, arranges for "redneck denizens" to ambush them and trap them in the trunk of their own car. Dugg and Ricch are also seen rapping in front of a burning Confederate flag.

== Charts ==
=== Weekly charts ===
Weekly chart performance for "4 Da Gang"
Chart (2021)	Peak position
Canada Hot 100 (Billboard)	68
Global 200 (Billboard)	110
New Zealand Hot Singles (RMNZ)	12
US Billboard Hot 100	67
US Hot R&B/Hip-Hop Songs (Billboard)	25
US Rhythmic Airplay (Billboard)	31

=== Year-end charts ===
Year-end chart performance for "4 Da Gang"
Chart (2021)	Position
US Hot R&B/Hip-Hop Songs (Billboard)	57

== Certifications ==
Region	Certification	Certified units/sales
New Zealand (RMNZ)	Gold	15,000^{‡}
United States (RIAA)	Gold	500,000^{‡}
^{‡} Sales+streaming figures based on certification alone.
