= Thang for You =

2023 single by Rylo Rodriguez featuring NoCap

Single by Rylo Rodriguez featuring NoCap

from the album Been One
- Released: June 23, 2023
- Length: 4:19
- Label: Glass Window
- Songwriters: Ryan Adams; Kobe Crawford Jr.; MK Beats; Gabe Lucas
- Producers: MK Beats; Lucas

Rylo Rodriguez singles chronology
"Hood Trophy" (2023)	"Thang for You" (2023)

NoCap singles chronology
"Diamonds & Dirt Roads" (2023)	"Thang for You" (2023)

Music video
- "Thang for You" on YouTube

"Thang for You" is a song by American rapper Rylo Rodriguez, released on June 23, 2023 as the lead single from his second studio album Been One (2023). It was produced by MK Beats and Gabe Lucas. A "heartsick" song, it is NoCap's first song to chart on the Billboard Hot 100, peaking at number 91.

== Charts ==
=== Weekly charts ===
Weekly chart performance for "Thang for You"
Chart (2023)	Peak position
US Billboard Hot 100	91
US Hot R&B/Hip-Hop Songs (Billboard)	25

=== Year-end charts ===
Year-end chart performance for "Thang for You"
Chart (2023)	Position
US Hot R&B/Hip-Hop Songs (Billboard)	91
