= Ugly (Russ song) =

2021 single by Russ featuring Lil Baby

Single by Russ featuring Lil Baby
- Released: January 8, 2021
- Genre: Dirty rap; trap
- Length: 3:14
- Label: Russ My Way
- Songwriters: Russell Vitale; Dominique Jones; Matthew Samuels; Arasb Ghassemi; Michael Samuels; Nicholas Tchernov
- Producers: Boi-1da; Akxen; Smplgtwy; Enndot

Russ singles chronology
| "Hard For Me" (2020) | "Ugly" (2021) | "Misunderstood" (2021) |

Lil Baby singles chronology
| "Sticky (Remix)" (2020) | "Ugly" (2021) | "Real as It Gets" (2021) |

Music video
- "Ugly" on YouTube

"Ugly" is a single by American rapper Russ featuring American rapper Lil Baby, released on January 8, 2021 alongside a music video. It was produced by Boi-1da, Akxen, Smplgtwy and Enndot.

== Content ==
The song finds the rappers boasting about their success, as well as women, money and luxury. Russ proclaims in the chorus, "'Cause I got your bitch now in love with me / And I'm in this bitch now, it's getting ugly". Lil Baby details his luxury cars, jewelry, and monetary gains in his verse, while also dismissing the issues in his relationship as a result of his infidelity.

== Music video ==
The music video was directed by Edgar Esteves and sees the rappers celebrate in a strip club, amid flashing colored lights as many women dance around them. Russ and Lil Baby wear diamond jewelry and throw plenty of money for the strippers.

== Charts ==
Chart performance for "Ugly"
| Chart (2021) | Peak position |
|---|---|
| New Zealand Hot Singles (RMNZ) | 24 |
| US Bubbling Under Hot 100 (Billboard) | 18 |
| US Hot R&B/Hip-Hop Songs (Billboard) | 49 |
