= Bigger than the Devil (EST Gee album) =

2026 studio album by EST Gee

Studio album by EST Gee
- Released: September 11, 2026
- Genres: Hip-hop; trap
- Length: 39:41
- Labels: CMG; Interscope
- Producers: Don Cannon; JohnGotitt; 1borek; Foreverolling; Chopz; Can't Rush the Vibe; K6WYA; Hermez; Bill C Da Don; Yung Dza; Payday; Blasty; Sinful Yts; Kendox; Serra; Amosxght; Poetic; Stephanspazzin; yunggokrazy; mannylyrical; govsensei; robawithit; MOZ; Rizzo; DamnATP!; Audiovista; Not Average; Dbackinyahead; Biel; Solt Boy; Lulescu

EST Gee chronology
Not a Chance in Hell (2026)	Bigger than the Devil (2026)

Singles from Bigger than the Devil
- 1. "Call Spitta" Released: July 10, 2026; 2. "Sometimes" Released: August 7, 2026; 3. "Ya Digg" Released: August 28, 2026; 4. "You Know It" Released: August 31, 2026

Bigger than the Devil (stylized in all caps) is the third studio album by American rapper EST Gee. It was released on September 11, 2026, by Collective Music Group and Interscope Records. The album features guest appearances from YFN Lucci, SKRT, EST SkiMike, 86Snot, EST Spit, and EST4Nikk.

== Composition ==
According to a press release, the album returns to themes of survival, loyalty, and self-assessment. The single "Ya Digg" features EST Gee alongside EST SkiMike, while "You Know It" features 86Snot, EST Spit, and EST4Nikk.

== Track listing ==
Bigger than the Devil track listing
No.	Title	Writer(s)	Producer(s)	Length
1.	"I Got It Lit"	George Stone III; Donald Cannon; Kameron Johnson; Jay Jenkins	Don Cannon; JohnGotitt	1:48
2.	"Rich Problems"	Stone; John Carlos Ramirez; Borys Dolecki; Jeffrey Jones Jr.; Johnson	JohnGotitt; 1borek; Foreverolling; Chopz	2:06
3.	"Way More"	Stone; Ramirez; Randy Razz II; Evan Huang; Christian McCulley; William Perkins Jr.; Johnson; Curtis Jackson; Brandon Parrott; Denaun Porter	JohnGotitt; Can't Rush the Vibe; K6WYA; Hermez; Bill C Da Don	2:34
4.	"Call Spitta"	Stone; Ramirez; Edis Selmani; Harald Hjermann Sorebo	JohnGotitt; Yung Dza; Payday	2:25
5.	"Tranquilizer" (featuring YFN Lucci and SKRT)	Stone; Rayshawn Bennett; Omarion Bullock; Ramirez; Razz II; Timofey Isaev; Matvey Grishichev; Johnson	JohnGotitt; Can't Rush the Vibe; Blasty; Sinful Yts	2:23
6.	"Ya Digg" (featuring EST SkiMike)	Stone; DeMichael Jackson; Ramirez; Razz II; Maik Reinicke; Matteo Serra; Johnson	JohnGotitt; Can't Rush the Vibe; Kendox; Serra	2:48
7.	"Thug Club"	Stone; Ramirez; Amr Mohamed; Jonathan Cole Kliman; Razz II; Stephan Hughey	JohnGotitt; Amosxght; Poetic; Can't Rush the Vibe; Stephanspazzin	2:16
8.	"Sometimes"	Stone; Ramirez; Razz II; Maksym Kyrylenko; Ivan Kyrylenko; Mark Sidorov; Johnson	JohnGotitt; Can't Rush the Vibe; yunggokrazy; mannylyrical	2:18
9.	"Hall of Fame"	Stone; Ramirez; Thijs Netten; Sorebo; Johnson	JohnGotitt; govsensei; Payday	2:22
10.	"Been Had Money"	Stone; Ramirez; Max Jacobsson; Robin Fingerroos; Johnson; Sally Ann Bucher; Kensey Rankin	Chopz; robawithit; MOZ; JohnGotitt	2:25
11.	"Never Made Statements"	Stone; Ramirez; Max Wonnenberg; Razz II; Arda Yusuf Tuerel; Johnson	JohnGotitt; Can't Rush the Vibe; Rizzo; DamnATP!	2:21
12.	"Birth of a Royal Child"	Stone; Ramirez; Henning Grüschow; Egor Bobin; Mikhail Bobin; Razz II; Mark Nikolaev; Johnson	JohnGotitt; Audiovista; Not Average; Can't Rush the Vibe	1:39
13.	"Supreme Sanders"	Stone; Jones Jr.; Vincenzo di Bacco	Foreverolling; Dbackinyahead	2:22
14.	"Skrrt"	Stone; Ramirez; Isaev; Gabriele Cerino; Nikolaev; Johnson	JohnGotitt; Blasty; Biel	2:02
15.	"Slide"	Stone; Jones; Yauheni Kurhan; Alexander Sekula; Johnson	Foreverolling; Solt Boy; Lulescu	3:10
16.	"You Know It" (featuring 86Snot, EST Spit, and EST4Nikk)	Stone; Meshon Morris; Dominic Taylor; Deron Perkins; Razz II; Huang; Johnson	JohnGotitt; Can't Rush the Vibe; K6WYA; Chopz	2:04
17.	"Bigger n Litter"	Stone; Ramirez; Max Racobsson; Jones Jr.; Johnson; Kenneth Edmonds; Kejuan Waliek Muchita; Jayceon Taylor	JohnGotitt; MOZ; Foreverolling	2:38
Total length:				39:41

Notes

- All tracks are stylized in all caps.

== Personnel ==
=== Musicians ===
- EST Gee – vocals
- YFN Lucci – vocals (track 5)
- SKRT – vocals (track 5)
- EST SkiMike – vocals (track 6)
- 86Snot – vocals (track 16)
- EST Spit – vocals (track 16)
- EST4Nikk – vocals (track 16)

=== Technical ===
- Jess Jackson – mixing, mastering (all tracks except 7 and 13)
- Royce Monroe – mixing (tracks 7, 13)
- Colin Leonard – mastering (tracks 7, 13)
- Dillon Brophy – additional mixing (all tracks except 7 and 13)
- JohnGotitt – recording

=== Management ===
- Bella Smith – A&R
- DaBoyDame – A&R
- Nicole Wyskoarko – A&R
- Brett Waters – A&R coordination (for CMG)
- Marissa Wickliffe – A&R administration

== Release history ==
Release dates and formats for Bigger than the Devil
Region	Date	Label(s)	Format(s)	Edition(s)	Ref.
Various	September 11, 2026	CMG; Interscope	Digital download; streaming	Standard	

== Charts ==
Chart performance for Bigger than the Devil
Chart (2026)	Peak position
US Billboard 200	86
US Top R&B/Hip-Hop Albums (Billboard)	28
