= Maybach (song) =

2021 single by 42 Dugg featuring Future

Single by 42 Dugg featuring Future

from the album Free Dem Boyz
- Released: May 21, 2021
- Length: 3:19
- Label: 4PF; Collective; Interscope
- Songwriters: Dion Hayes; Nayvadius Wilburn; Darius Henry; Jeuan Tabarrejo; Gorelov Aleksandrovich; Damien Aubrey; Robert Mandell
- Producers: Yung Dee; G1; Chosen 1; DaBoyDame; G Koop

42 Dugg singles chronology
"Fake Shit" (2021)	"Maybach" (2021)

Future singles chronology
"Take Off" (2021)	"Maybach" (2021)	"Nobody Special" (2021)

Music video
- "Maybach" on YouTube

"Maybach" is a song by American rapper 42 Dugg, and the fifth single from his fourth mixtape Free Dem Boyz (2021). It features American rapper Future and was produced by G1, Chosen 1, Yung Dee, DaBoyDame, and G Koop. The song sees the rappers "harmonizing about street scars and current wealth".

== Controversy ==
The song was previewed on May 19, 2021, and circulated around the internet because of Future's lyrics about his ex-girlfriend Lori Harvey: "Tell Steve Harvey I don't want her / One thing I never seen was a bitch to leave." On May 27, 2021, 42 Dugg leaked an original verse of the song, in which Future also disses Steve Harvey and Michael B. Jordan: "Magic City, I'm the owner / Tell Steve Harvey I don't want her / Must have forgotten to tell her daddy she begged me not to leave / Put baguettes on your ankles damn near up to your knees / She didn't have a choice but to go fuck a lame after me / Realest nigga hit the twat, she damn near OD'ed".

== Music video ==
The music video, released on May 20, 2021, was directed by Jerry Productions. In it, 42 Dugg and Future are seen in Maybachs holding up large sums of cash. They also show off "gaudy jewelry, high-priced champagne, and beautiful women".

== Charts ==
=== Weekly charts ===
Weekly chart performance for "Maybach"
Chart (2021)	Peak position
Global 200 (Billboard)	142
US Billboard Hot 100	68
US Hot R&B/Hip-Hop Songs (Billboard)	26

=== Year-end charts ===
Year-end chart performance for "Maybach"
Chart (2021)	Position
US Hot R&B/Hip-Hop Songs (Billboard)	94

== Certifications ==
Region	Certification	Certified units/sales
United States (RIAA)	Gold	500,000^{‡}
^{‡} Sales+streaming figures based on certification alone.
