= Thump Shit =

2022 single by 42 Dugg and EST Gee

Single by 42 Dugg and EST Gee

from the album Last Ones Left
- Released: April 5, 2022
- Genre: Hip hop
- Length: 3:46
- Label: CMG; Warlike; Interscope
- Songwriters: Dion Hayes; George Stone III; Khaya Gilika; John Scherer; Papa Abdou Fall; Isaiah Brown; Jared Brown; Sterling White, Jr.
- Producers: Big Papito; Isaiah; Jared "JB" Brown; Spiff Sinatra

42 Dugg singles chronology
"Everybody Shooters Too" (2022)	"Thump Shit" (2022)	"Soon" (2022)

EST Gee singles chronology
"Feelings" (2022)	"Thump Shit" (2022)	"Borderline" (2022)

Music video
- "Thump Sh*t" on YouTube

"Thump Shit" is a song by American rappers 42 Dugg and EST Gee, released on April 5, 2022, as the fourth single from their collaborative mixtape Last Ones Left (2022).

== Composition ==
The song, described as "bouncing and hooky", features a "bumpin'" bass. In his verse, 42 Dugg brags about being able to sell drugs, while Est Gee raps about violence.

== Critical reception ==
Joe Price of Complex praised the song, writing that it "showcases their chemistry as they effortlessly deliver their verses over some chaotic production." Similarly, Aron A. of HotNewHipHop wrote that the song is "yet another reminder why they are two of the most exciting rappers out right now." Writing for Pitchfork, Alphonse Pierre described that the topic of 42 Dugg's verse "fits oddly" with that of EST Gee's.

== Music video ==
A music video for the song was released on April 8, 2022. Directed by Diesel Films, it finds 42 Dugg and EST Gee flamboyantly wearing their jewelry. Rapper Lil Baby makes a cameo appearance in a nightclub.

== Charts ==
Chart performance for "Thump Shit"
Chart (2022)	Peak position
US Billboard Hot 100	79
US Hot R&B/Hip-Hop Songs (Billboard)	26
