= Last Ones Left =

Mixtape by 42 Dugg and EST Gee
- Released: April 8, 2022
- Genre: Hip-hop
- Length: 38:24
- Label: CMG; Warlike; Interscope
- Producer: Helluva; Big Papito; Isaiah; Jared "JB" Brown; Spiff Sinatra; Duce; Foreverolling; Flex on the Beat; Tymaz; Buru Beats; David Morse; JB Sauced Up; VenoTheBuilder; Chichi; Section 8; Tax Holloway; Ronnie Lucciano; Antt Beatz; Mia JayC; Enrgy Beats; DJ Swift; Audiovista; John Got It; Moz; Sk808

42 Dugg chronology
Free Dem Boyz (2021)	Last Ones Left (2022)	4eva Us Neva Them (2024)

EST Gee chronology
Bigger Than Life or Death, Pt. 2 (2021)	Last Ones Left (2022)	I Never Felt Nun (2022)

Singles from Last Ones Left
- 1. "Who Hotter Than Gee" Released: January 31, 2022; 2. "Free the Shiners" Released: March 23, 2022; 3. "Everybody Shooters Too" Released: March 30, 2022; 4. "Thump Shit" Released: April 5, 2022

Last Ones Left is a collaborative mixtape by American rappers 42 Dugg and EST Gee, released April 8, 2022, by Collective Music Group, Warlike, and Interscope Records.

== Style and reception ==
Last Ones Left ratings
Review scores
Source	Rating
AllMusic	3.5/5 stars
HipHopDX	3.5/5
HotNewHipHop	83%
Pitchfork	7/10

AllMusic wrote that the project "emphasizes the duo's unlikely complementary chemistry, with EST Gee's growl playing off of Dugg's tinny, relentless flows", with "highlights happen[ing] when the rappers hit a collective stride" such as Gee "sounding directly inspired by Dugg's verses" on "Thump Shit". The mixtape's final five tracks, which "showcase individual tracks and even some solo material from other artists EST Gee and 42 Dugg are affiliated with", end up "feeling more like a compilation and taking away somewhat from the impact of the rest of the tape", but the project's "strongest moments ... capture the intensity and power that happen when these two creative forces reveal they're more similar than they might first appear." HipHopDX's Matthew Ritchie says the duo's "proximity-based partnership produces natural chemistry, avoiding the pitfalls of cheap collaborative albums such as Lil Durk and Lil Baby's Voice of the Heroes" and "even as the tone gets old after 17 tracks, the tape goes hard for a commercial project." The project's "production styles feel distinct enough to make it seem like Dugg and EST Gee can run their relay race on any background", such as "the electronic keyboard clashing with the pounding bass" on "Thump Shit", the "NBA YoungBoy-inspired" "Free the Shiners", and the "unmistakable piano crashes of Enrgy Beats on "Everybody Shooters Too". Whether the project stands the test of time, "Gee and Dugg have mercifully raised the bar for star rapper collabs."

Pitchfork's Alphonse Pierre agrees, saying "Dugg and Gee complement each other well enough: They're both hugely influenced by rap scenes in the South and Midwest, and they both tell hardened drug-dealing stories that blur the lines between reality and myth" and that the "highlights are the tracks where their verses weave together to the point that they feel like one", such as on "Ice Talk" where "Dugg and Gee are in complete sync, building off each other's last lines every time they pass the mic." Pierre concludes by saying "Even if 42 Dugg and EST Gee aren't the most organic duo, it's hard not to have fun with two scorching-hot rappers going toe-to-toe." HotNewHipHop's Aron A. notes "a sweet spot between the guttural sounds of Louisville and the icy production of Detroit that ties together through a mutual understanding of a universal code of the streets", and also suggests you "have to applaud the sentiment" behind Dugg and Gee including posse cuts such as "Whole Gang Buss" and "Free Zoski" despite them "tak[ing] away from the central focus of Dugg and Gee's irresistible rapport as collaborators."

=== Year-end lists ===
Last Ones Left year-end lists
Publication	#	Ref.
The New York Times (Jon Caramanica)	8	

== Track listing ==
Last Ones Left track listing
No.	Title	Producer(s)	Length
1.	"Ice Talk"	Helluva	2:31
2.	"Thump Shit"	Big Papito; Isaiah; Jared "JB" Brown; Spiff Sinatra	3:46
3.	"I Never Judged You"	Duce; Foreverolling	1:54
4.	"Spin"	Foreverolling; Flex on the Beat; Tymaz	2:21
5.	"Skcretch Sum"	David Morse; Foreverolling	2:25
6.	"Free the Shiners"	JB Sauced Up; VenoTheBuilder	2:05
7.	"All 100s"	Chichi; Section 8	2:12
8.	"Whole Gang Buss" (featuring Reaper and Tae Money)	Tax Holloway	2:13
9.	"Free Zoski" (featuring Big30 and EST Zo)	Ronnie Lucciano; Buru Beats	2:24
10.	"Can't Be Fucked With"	Antt Beatz	1:47
11.	"My Yungin"	Helluva; Mia JayC	2:17
12.	"Everybody Shooters Too"	Enrgy Beats	1:53
13.	"Who Hotter Than Gee"	DJ Swift	2:16
14.	"Of Course" (featuring Tae Money)	Audiovista; Foreverolling; Flex on the Beat	1:55
15.	"Never Scared" (featuring EST DeMike)	John Got It; Moz	2:23
16.	"Strictly for the Gangstas" (featuring EST Red)	Foreverolling	1:46
17.	"Gave It Back"	Flex on the Beat; Sk808	2:15
Total length:			38:24

== Charts ==
Chart performance for Last Ones Left
Chart (2022)	Peak position
Canadian Albums (Billboard)	95
US Billboard 200	7
US Top R&B/Hip-Hop Albums (Billboard)	3
