= Robbery laws in the United States =

This is a list of the robbery laws in the United States and their associated penalties.

== Federal ==
=== STATE ===
U.S. Code Title 18- Not more than 15 years' imprisonment.

=== Uniform Code of Military Justice ===
For individuals subject to the Uniform Code of Military Justice, 10 U.S. Code § 922 applies.

Charge	Penalty	Reference
Robbery committed with a firearm	Up to Dishonorable discharge, forfeiture of all pay and allowances, and imprisonment for 15 years.	
Robbery committed without a firearm	Up to Dishonorable discharge, forfeiture of all pay and allowances, and imprisonment for 10 years.	

== State ==
=== Alabama ===
Charge	Penalty
First degree robbery	life or 10–99 years in prison (if a firearm was used, life or 20–99 years in prison)
Second degree robbery	2–20 years in prison
Third degree robbery	1 year and 1 day-10 years in prison

=== Alaska ===
Charge	Penalty
First degree robbery	up to 20 years in prison and up to a $250,000 fine
Second degree robbery	up to 10 years in prison and up to a $10,000 fine

=== Arizona ===
Charge	Penalty
Simple Robbery	1–3 years and 9 months in prison.(A 2nd offense is 2 years and 3 months-7 years and 6 months. A 3rd and subsequent offense is 6–15 years in prison).
Aggravated Robbery	2–8 years and 9 months in prison.(A 2nd offense is 2 years and 3 months-7 years and 6 months. A 3rd and subsequent offense is 6–15 years in prison).
Armed Robbery	7–21 years in prison.(A 2nd and subsequent offense is 14–28 years in prison. Two or more Dangerous Felony Offenses not committed in the same incident, may be consolidated for trial purposes; or that are not historical prior felony convictions is 10 years and 6 months-26 years and 6 months in prison but if it was a 3rd charge, 21–35 years in prison. Three or more Dangerous Felony Offenses not committed in the same incident, may be consolidated for trial purposes; or that are not historical prior felony convictions is 15 years and 6 months-35 years in prison.)

A fine is $750–150,000. A fine for each offense of those charges are no different.

=== Arkansas ===
Charge	Penalty
Robbery	5–20 years in prison and a $15,000 fine.
Aggravated Robbery	10–40 years or Life (defendant serves 70% of this before parole) in prison.

=== California ===
Charge	Penalty
First degree robbery	3, 4, or 6 years in prison. if the defendant committed first-degree robbery in an inhabited structure, in concert with 2 or more other people, 3, 6, or 9 years in prison. If it involves serious bodily injury, 6, 7, 9, 10, or 12 years in prison. If a firearm was used, 13, 14, or 16 years. If the charge involving the firearm had it personally or intentionally firing it with no bodily injury, 23, 24, or 26 years in prison. If a firearm was used and it involved great bodily injury, 28, 29, or 31 years to Life in prison.
Second degree robbery	2, 3, or 5 years in prison. If it involves serious bodily injury, 5, 6, 8, 9, or 11 years in prison. If a firearm was used, 12, 13, or 15 years. If the charge involving the firearm had it personally or intentionally firing it with no bodily injury, 22, 23, or 25 years. If a firearm was used and it involved great bodily injury, 27, 28, or 30 years to Life in prison.

=== Colorado ===
Charge	Penalty
Robbery	2–6 years in prison, a $2,000-500,000 fine, and 3 years of supervised release. If the victim was 70 years or older or was disabled, 4–12 years in prison, and 4 years of supervised release with an additional 5 years, and a $500,000.
Aggravated robbery	4–16 years in prison, a $750,000 fine, and 5 years of supervised release. If it involves serious bodily injury or if the defendant used or threatened the use of a deadly weapon, 10–32 years in prison, and 5 years of supervised release. If the object was to take any controlled substance from a pharmacy or other place or the defendant was in possession of narcotics, 16–48 years in prison, 5 years of supervised release, and a $5,000-$100,000 fine.

=== Connecticut ===
Charge	Penalty
First degree robbery	1–20 years in prison and a $15,000 fine. If it involves an occupied motor vehicle, 3–60 years in prison
Second degree robbery	1–10 years in prison and a $10,000 fine. If it involves an occupied motor vehicle, 3–30 years in prison
Third degree robbery	1–5 years in prison and a $5,000 fine. If it involves an occupied motor vehicle, 3–15 years in prison

=== Delaware ===
Charge	Penalty
First degree robbery	5 years in prison. If an offense committed within 10 years of completing a prison term for a previous robbery, 10 years in prison.
Second degree robbery	3 years in prison. If an offense committed within 10 years of completing a prison term for a previous robbery, 8 years in prison.

=== District of Columbia ===
Not less than 2 years and not more than 15 years' imprisonment. If the defendant was armed, 30 years. Depending on the nature of the prior offense and the person's criminal history, it could also include a mandatory minimum sentence of 5 or 10 years.

=== Florida ===
Charge	Penalty
Second degree robbery	15 years in prison (not more than 5 years' imprisonment if robbery is done by sudden snatching)
First degree robbery	30 years in prison. (If this offense had the intent to facilitate or further terrorism, Life in prison (For juveniles, a judge will set a maximum sentence of 40 years and they are eligible for review after serving 5/8 of that sentence)).
Home invasion robbery	30 years in prison. (If this offense had the intent to facilitate or further terrorism, Life in prison (For juveniles, a judge will set a maximum sentence of 40 years and they are eligible for review after serving 5/8 of that sentence)).

=== Georgia ===
Charge	Penalty
Robbery	1–20 years in prison.
Armed robbery	10–20 years. If this involves taking a controlled substance from a pharmacy or a wholesale druggist and intentionally inflicts bodily injury upon any person, such facts shall be charged in the indictment or accusation and, if found to be true by the court or if admitted by the defendant, 15–20 years. If this involves taking a controlled substance from a pharmacy or a wholesale druggist and/or intentionally inflicts the death upon any person, such facts shall be charged in the indictment or accusation and, if convicted, Death or Life imprisonment (For juveniles, a judge will set a 30 years-to-Life sentence).
Robbery of a pharmacy	10 years. If this involves any type of bodily injury, 15 years.

=== Hawaii ===
Charge	Penalty
Second degree robbery	10 years in prison
First degree robbery	20 years in prison

=== Idaho ===
Not less than 5 years and not more than life imprisonment (eligible for parole after serving 25 years)

=== Illinois ===
Charge	Penalty
Robbery	3–7 years. If the robbery is committed upon a person that is over 60 years old, is physically handicapped, or if the Robbery occurred in a school or church, 4–15 years. If it involved certain conditions, 30–60 years in prison.
Armed Robbery	6–30 years. If it involved certain aggravating conditions, 30–60 years in prison.
Aggravated Robbery	4–15 years in prison.

=== Indiana ===
1–6 years in prison (3–16 years if the defendant was armed)

=== Iowa ===
Charge	Penalty
first degree robbery	25 years
second degree robbery	10 years
third degree robbery	5 years

=== Kansas ===
Charge	Penalty
Simple Robbery	14 years in prison (minimum is 13–25 months)
Aggravated Robbery	20 years in prison (minimum is 26–49 months)

=== Kentucky ===
Not less than 5 years and not more than 10 years' imprisonment (if imprisonment is imposed and no felonies within prior 5 years)

=== Louisiana ===
Not more than 7 years' imprisonment with or without hard labor (not less than 2 years and not more than 20 years' imprisonment with or without hard labor if object of robbery was a purse containing anything of value)

10–99 years Armed robbery

=== Maine ===
Not more than 10 years' imprisonment

=== Maryland ===
Not more than 15 years' imprisonment

=== Massachusetts ===
Not more than life imprisonment (eligible for parole after serving not less than 15 years and not more than 25 years) or any term of years

=== Michigan ===
Not more than 15 years' imprisonment

=== Minnesota ===
Not more than 10 years' imprisonment

=== Mississippi ===
Not more than 15 years' imprisonment

=== Missouri ===
Not less than 5 years and not more than 15 years' imprisonment (if imprisonment is imposed)

=== Montana ===
Not less than 2 years and not more than 40 years' imprisonment

=== Nebraska ===
Not less than 1 year and not more than 50 years' imprisonment (if imprisonment is imposed)

=== Nevada ===
Not less than 2 years and not more than 15 years' imprisonment (if imprisonment is imposed)

=== New Hampshire ===
Not more than 7 years' imprisonment

=== New Jersey ===
Not less than 5 years and not more than 10 years' imprisonment (if imprisonment is imposed)

=== New Mexico ===
Not more than 3 years' imprisonment

=== New York ===
Charge	Penalty
First-Degree Robbery	25 years in prison
Second-Degree Robbery	15 years in prison
Third-Degree Robbery	7 years in prison

=== North Carolina ===
Not less than 8 months and not more than 16 months' imprisonment (if imprisonment is imposed and little to no criminal history)

=== North Dakota ===
Not more than 5 years' imprisonment

=== Ohio ===
9, 12, 18, 24, 30, or 36 months' imprisonment (if imprisonment is imposed)

=== Oklahoma ===
Not more than 10 years' imprisonment

=== Oregon ===
Not more than 5 years' imprisonment

=== Pennsylvania ===
Not more than 10 years' imprisonment

=== Rhode Island ===
Not less than 5 years and not more than 30 years' imprisonment (if imprisonment is imposed)

=== South Carolina ===
Not more than 15 years' imprisonment

=== South Dakota ===
Charge	Penalty
First-Degree Robbery	25 years in prison
Second-Degree Robbery	10 years in prison

=== Tennessee ===
Not less than 2.7 years and not more than 15 years' imprisonment (if imprisonment is imposed)

=== Texas ===
Not less than 2 years and not more than 20 years' imprisonment (if imprisonment is imposed)

=== Utah ===
Not less than 1 year and not more than 15 years' imprisonment (if imprisonment is imposed)

=== Vermont ===
Not more than 10 years' imprisonment

=== Virginia ===
Not less than 5 years and not more than life imprisonment (eligible for parole after serving 15 years)

=== Washington ===
Not more than 10 years' imprisonment

=== West Virginia ===
Not less than 5 years and not more than 28 years' imprisonment

=== Wisconsin ===
Not more than 10 years' imprisonment

=== Wyoming ===
Not more than 10 years' imprisonment
