= 42 Dugg =

American rapper (born 1994)

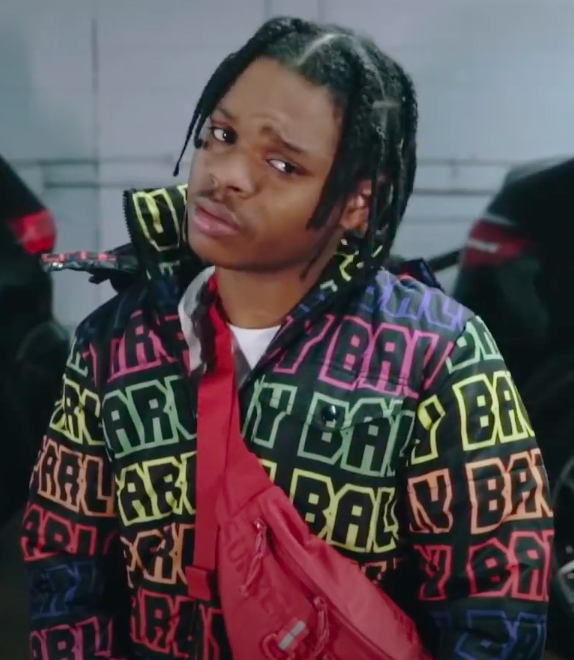
- 42 Dugg in 2019

Background information
- Born: Dion Marquise Hayes; November 25, 1994 (age 31); Detroit, Michigan, U.S.
- Genre: Michigan rap
- Occupations: Rapper; songwriter; singer
- Years active: 2017–present
- Labels: Glass Window (4PF); Collective; Interscope; EMPIRE
- Criminal information
- Status: Imprisoned from March 28 to October 17, 2023
- Criminal charge: Failure to serve sentence (×1)
- Penalty: 12 months (commuted)

Details
- Date apprehended: March 28, 2023

Dion Marquise Hayes (born November 25, 1994), known professionally as 42 Dugg, is an American rapper and singer. In 2019, he signed with Yo Gotti and Lil Baby's respective labels, Collective Music Group (CMG) and Glass Window Entertainment (previously known as 4PF), through a joint venture with Interscope Records. He is best known for his collaborations with the latter, with whom he co-performed the 2020 songs "We Paid" and "Grace" — the former peaked within the top ten of the Billboard Hot 100 and received quintuple platinum certification by the Recording Industry Association of America (RIAA).

His second mixtape, Young & Turnt 2 (2020), was met with critical acclaim and marked his debut on the Billboard 200. His 2021 singles, "4 Da Gang" (with Roddy Ricch) and "Maybach" (featuring Future), both received gold certifications and preceded his fourth mixtape Free Dem Boyz (2021), which peaked at number eight on the Billboard 200.

== Early life ==
Dion Hayes was born on November 25, 1994, and raised in the Denby neighborhood on Whittier Ave & Wayburn St. on Detroit's east side. He attended Denby High School in Detroit but later dropped out. He met fellow rapper Lil Baby in 2017. He grew up listening to Yo Gotti and Jeezy. Hayes employs a slurred vocal delivery with Auto-Tune. His whistle has been noted as his signature sound that also kicks off nearly every song on his 2020 mixtape Young and Turnt Vol 2.

== Career ==
Hayes first gained traction for his 2018 singles "The Streets" (featuring Babyface Ray) and "STFU" (with Peezy, EWM Kdoe, Bagboy Mel, Cashkidd and Ewm Buck). After writing slam poetry with Lil Baby, he signed to Lil Baby's 4 Pockets Full (4PF) and Yo Gotti's Collective Music Group (CMG), in conjunction with Interscope Records. Hayes received national attention when he was featured on Lil Baby's February 2020 song "Grace", which peaked at number 48 on the Billboard Hot 100.

The song was included on Baby's album My Turn, and its deluxe edition—released in May 2020—contained their second collaborative song "We Paid", which peaked at number ten on the Billboard Hot 100. This boosted sales of his mixtape Young & Turnt 2, which debuted at number 58 on the Billboard 200 and number six on Billboard's Independent Albums chart. Hayes followed up with guest performances on songs for other artists including Marshmello, Lil Keed, Meek Mill, Blac Youngsta, Big Sean, T.I., Kaash Paige, 2 Chainz, Tory Lanez and Latto. As of 2024, Hayes has guest featured on 15 total songs.

In May 2021, Billboard named Hayes the "R&B/Hip-Hop Rookie of the Month". That same week, on May 21, 2021, Hayes released the 19-track mixtape, titled Free Dem Boyz, in dedication to his incarcerated friends. The project features the "standout" single "4 da Gang", a collaboration with California rapper Roddy Ricch. Also in 2021, he was featured on the annual XXL Freshman Class. In July 2023, he appeared on King Von's second posthumous album Grandson, on the track "GangLand".

== Personal life ==
Hayes supported the Donald Trump 2024 presidential campaign. He released a song in support of the campaign in August 2024 and performed at a rally in September 2024.

=== 2021 shooting ===
On February 21, 2021, a shooting occurred at Roddy Ricch and 42 Dugg's music video shoot, which left three people injured in Atlanta. Alabama rapper OMB Peezy was later charged with aggravated assault with a deadly weapon and possession of a firearm during the commission of a crime. All three injured survived.

=== Legal issues ===
In 2019, Hayes was seen firing a gun in an Atlanta gun range, which he was prohibited from doing due to a prior felony conviction. He was sentenced to three years of probation and ordered to pay a $90,000 fine. On June 5, 2020, Hayes fled from a traffic stop in a rented SUV after running through a stop sign and spent two months as a fugitive. Authorities worked with the rental company to try to catch Hayes. Police captured Hayes on August 4, 2020, and charged him with a third-degree felony for fleeing from police. He was released on a $20,000 bond. Having violated the terms of his release for the gun range incident, he was sentenced to six months in a federal prison camp.

In April 2022, Hayes tried to avoid incarceration by filing a court document in which he claimed to be a sovereign citizen immune from federal laws. On May 5, 2022, he was arrested in Ypsilanti, Michigan at Willow Run Airport after failing to report to serve his prison sentence.

In April 2023, 42 Dugg received a one-year prison sentence for failure to report, stemming from a series of events that began with gun charges against the rapper in 2020. Dugg was released from the United States Penitentiary, Atlanta on October 16, 2023, after spending 18 months incarcerated.

== Discography ==
=== Studio albums ===
Title	Details	Peak chart positions
Title	Details	US
4eva Us Neva Them	Released: July 3, 2024; Label: 4PF CMG, Interscope; Format: Digital download, streaming	76

=== Compilation albums ===
Title	Details	Peak chart positions
Title	Details	US
Gangsta Art (with CMG the Label)	Released: July 15, 2022; Label: CMG, Interscope; Format: Digital download, streaming	11
Gangsta Art 2 (with CMG the Label)	Released: September 29, 2023; Label: CMG, Interscope; Format: Digital download, streaming	78

=== Mixtapes ===
Title	Mixtape details	Peak chart positions				
Title	Mixtape details	US	US R&B/HH	US Rap	US Ind.	CAN
11241 Wayburn	Released: July 19, 2018; Label: Self-released; Format: Digital download, streaming	—	—	—	—	—
Young and Turnt	Released: March 15, 2019; Label: 4PF, CMG, Empire; Format: Digital download, streaming	—	—	—	19	—
Young & Turnt, Vol. 2	Released: March 27, 2020; Label: 4PF, CMG, Empire; Format: Digital download, streaming	58	33	—	6	—
Free Dem Boyz	Released: May 21, 2021; Label: 4PF, CMG, Interscope; Format: Digital download, streaming	8	4	4	—	36
Last Ones Left (with EST Gee)	Released: April 8, 2022; Label: CMG, Warlike, Interscope; Format: Digital download, streaming	7	3	3	—	95
Part 3	Released: January 23, 2026; Label: 4PF, CMG, Interscope; Format: Digital download, streaming	—	—	—	—	—
"—" denotes a recording that did not chart or was not released in that territory.

=== Extended plays ===
Title	EP details
11241 Wayburn, Pt. 2	Released: July 25, 2018; Label: Self-released; Format: Digital download, streaming

=== Singles ===
==== As lead artist ====
List of singles as lead artist, with selected chart positions
Title	Year	Peak chart positions						Certifications	Album
Title	Year	US	US R&B /HH	US Rap	CAN	NZ Hot	WW	Certifications	Album
"The Streets" (with Babyface Ray)	2018	—	—	—	—	—	—		Young and Turnt
"Real Talk"	2018	—	—	—	—	—	—		Young and Turnt
"Tripping"	2019	—	—	—	—	—	—		Young and Turnt
"You da One" (with Yo Gotti)	2019	—	—	—	—	—	—		Young and Turnt
"Bounce Back" (with Yo Gotti)	2019	—	—	—	—	—	—		Young & Turnt, Vol. 2
"Palm Angels in the Sky"	2020	—	—	—	—	—	—		Young & Turnt, Vol. 2
"Hard Times"	2020	—	—	—	—	—	—		Young & Turnt, Vol. 2
"Free Merey"	2020	—	—	—	—	—	—		Free Dem Boyz
"Baggin'" (with Marshmello)	2020	—	—	—	—	—	—		Non-album singles
"Shining" (with LBS Kee'vin)	2020	—	—	—	—	—	—		Non-album singles
"Free Me"	2020	—	—	—	—	—	—		Free Dem Boyz
"4 da Gang" (with Roddy Ricch)	2021	67	25	21	68	12	110	RIAA: Gold	Free Dem Boyz
"Maybach" (featuring Future)	2021	68	23	16	—	—	142	RIAA: Gold	Free Dem Boyz
"Down Ready Set"	2021	—	—	—	—	—	—		Madden NFL 22
"Free the Shiners" (with EST Gee)	2022	—	—	—	—	—	—		Last Ones Left
"Everybody Shooters Too" (with EST Gee)	2022	— (Note: "Everybody Shooters Too" did not enter the Billboard Hot 100, but peaked at number 14 on the Bubbling Under Hot 100 chart.)	47	—	—	—	—	RIAA: Gold	Last Ones Left
"Thump Shit" (with EST Gee)	2022	79	26	22	—	—	—	RIAA: Gold	Last Ones Left
"Soon" (featuring Arabian)	2022	—	—	—	—	—	—		Non-album singles
"U-Digg" (with Lil Baby and Veeze)	2022	52	16	8	69	—	108		Non-album singles
"Steppers" (with Yo Gotti and Moneybagg Yo featuring CMG the Label, EST Gee, Mozzy and Blac Youngsta)	2022	— (Note: "Steppers" did not enter the Billboard Hot 100, but peaked at number four on the Bubbling Under Hot 100 chart.)	26	25	—	—	—		Gangsta Art
"Ron Artest" (with Babyface Ray)	2023	— (Note: "Ron Artest" did not enter the Billboard Hot 100, but peaked at number 23 on the Bubbling Under Hot 100 chart.)	—	—	—	—	—	RIAA: Platinum	Non-album singles
"Go Again"	2023	—	—	—	—	—	—		Non-album singles
"SpinDatBac"	2023	—	—	—	—	—	—		Non-album singles
"Wock n Red"	2024	—	—	—	—	—	—		Non-album singles
"Win Wit Us"	2024	—	—	—	—	—	—		4eva Us Neva Them
"Thick One" (with Skilla Baby)	2026	—	48	—	—	—	—		Non-album single
"Round & Round" (with DDG, Pluto, Bankroll Ni and SMJ)	2026	—	38	25	—	—	—		Hit-a-Thon
"—" denotes a recording that did not chart or was not released in that territory.

==== As featured artist ====
List of singles as featured artist
Title	Year	Peak chart positions			Album
Title	Year	US Bub.	US R&B/HH	US Rap	Album
"Solid" (Yella Beezy featuring 42 Dugg)	2020	—	—	—	Non-album single
"Cold Gangsta" (Yo Gotti featuring EST Gee and 42 Dugg)	2022	2	35	23	CM10: Free Game

=== Other charted songs ===
Title	Year	Peak chart positions							Certifications	Album
Title	Year	US	US R&B /HH	US Rap	CAN	NZ Hot	UK	WW	Certifications	Album
"Grace" (with Lil Baby)	2020	48	23	18	—	—	—	—	RIAA: 2× Platinum	My Turn
"We Paid" (with Lil Baby)	2020	10	8	5	42	31	89	93	RIAA: 5× Platinum; BPI: Silver	My Turn
"Friday Night Cypher" (Big Sean featuring Tee Grizzley, Kash Doll, Cash Kidd, Payroll Giovanni, 42 Dugg, Boldy James, Drego, Sada Baby, Royce da 5'9", and Eminem)	2020	— (Note: "Friday Night Cypher" did not enter the Billboard Hot 100, but peaked at number 10 on the Bubbling Under Hot 100 chart.)	— (Note: "Friday Night Cypher" did not enter the Hot R&B/Hip-Hop Songs chart, but peaked at number 14 on the R&B/Hip-Hop Digital Song Sales chart.)	—	—	—	—	—		Detroit 2
"GTA" (Meek Mill featuring 42 Dugg)	2020	— (Note: "GTA" did not enter the Billboard Hot 100, but peaked at number 7 on the Bubbling Under Hot 100 chart.)	47	—	—	—	—	—		Quarantine Pack
"Lemonhead" (Tyler, the Creator featuring 42 Dugg)	2021	42	15	12	35	7	—	41	RIAA: Gold	Call Me If You Get Lost
"Bout a Million" (Pop Smoke featuring 21 Savage and 42 Dugg)	2021	54	19	15	23	5	64	46		Faith
"5500 Degrees" (EST Gee featuring Lil Baby, 42 Dugg, and Rylo Rodriguez)	2021	92	34	—	—	—	—	—	RIAA: Platinum	Bigger than Life or Death
"Ice Talk" (with EST Gee)	2022	— (Note: "Ice Talk" did not enter the Billboard Hot 100, but peaked at number 21 on the Bubbling Under Hot 100 chart.)	—	—	—	—	—	—		Last Ones Left
"Like Me" (Future featuring 42 Dugg and Lil Baby)	2022	— (Note: "Like Me" did not enter the Billboard Hot 100, but peaked at number 15 on the Bubbling Under Hot 100 chart.)	—	—	—	—	—	—		I Never Liked You
"Gangsta Art" (Yo Gotti and Moneybagg Yo featuring EST Gee, Mozzy, Blac Youngsta, Lehla Samia and 42 Dugg)	2022	— (Note: "Gangsta Art" did not enter the Billboard Hot 100, but peaked at number 17 on the Bubbling Under Hot 100 chart.)	41	—	—	—	—	—		Gangsta Art
"Million Dollars Worth of Game" (featuring 42 Dugg)	2022	— (Note: "Million Dollars Worth of Game" did not enter the Billboard Hot 100, but peaked at number 12 on the Bubbling Under Hot 100 Singles chart.)	—	—	—	— (Note: "Million Dollars Worth of Game" did not enter the NZ Top 40 Singles Chart, but peaked at number 27 on the NZ Hot Singles Chart.)	—	—	RIAA: Gold	Dope Don't Sell Itself
"—" denotes a recording that did not chart or was not released in that territory.

=== Guest appearances ===
List of non-single guest appearances, with other performing artists, showing year released and album name
Title	Year	Other artist(s)	Album
"Grace"	2020	Lil Baby	My Turn
"We Paid"	2020	Lil Baby	My Turn
"Twisted"	2020	Lil Keed	Trapped on Cleveland 3
"Friday Night Cypher"	2020	Big Sean, Tee Grizzley, Kash Doll, Cash Kidd, Payroll Giovanni, Boldy James, Drego, Sada Baby, Royce da 5'9", Eminem	Detroit 2
"Gun Smoke"	2020	Blac Youngsta	Code Red
"On the Hood"	2020	T.I., Mozzy	The L.I.B.R.A.
"Streets"	2020	Blac Youngsta, Yo Gotti	Fuck Everybody 3
"GTA"	2020	Meek Mill	Quarantine Pack
"My Time to Shine"	2020	Tory Lanez	Loner
"Money Long"	2021	DDG, OG Parker	Die 4 Respect
"Bout a Million"	2021	Pop Smoke, 21 Savage	Faith
"5500 Degrees"	2021	EST Gee, Lil Baby, Rylo Rodriguez	Bigger than Life or Death
"5500 Degrees"	2021	EST Gee, Yo Gotti	Bigger than Life or Death
"Offense"	2021	Big Sean, Hit-Boy, Babyface Ray	What You Expect
"Push Start"	2021	French Montana, Coi Leray	They Got Amnesia
"Like Me"	2022	Future, Lil Baby	I Never Liked You
"Up Now"	2024	Mustard, Lil Yachty, BlueBucksClan	Faith of a Mustard Seed
"Only Gang"	2024	Polo G	Hood Poet

"Different"
