= EST Gee =

American rapper (born 1994)

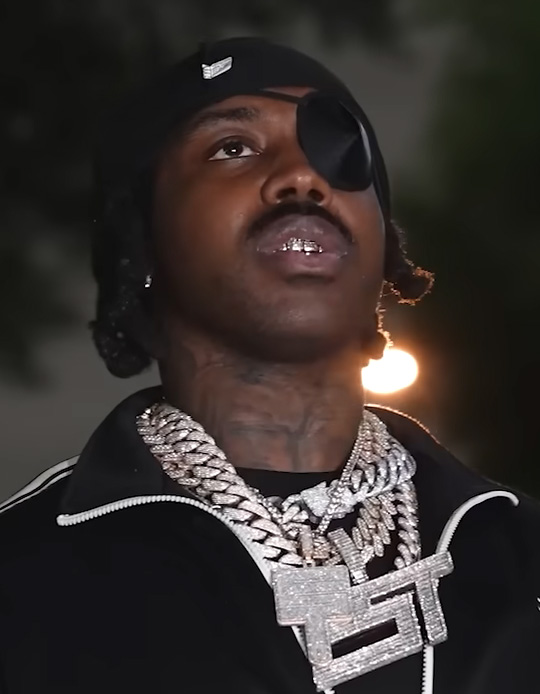
- EST Gee in 2025

Background information
- Also known as: Big Gee; Lamborghini Geeski; Riata Dada; 5500 king; El Toro
- Born: George Albert Stone III; May 11, 1994 (age 32) Louisville, Kentucky, U.S.
- Genres: Southern hip-hop; trap
- Occupations: Rapper; songwriter
- Years active: 2017–present
- Labels: Collective; Interscope; Warlike
- Website: est-gee.com

George Albert Stone III (born May 11, 1994), known professionally as EST Gee, is an American rapper. Born and raised in Louisville, Kentucky, he signed with Yo Gotti's Collective Music Group (CMG), an imprint of Interscope Records in a joint venture with Warlike in early 2021. His fifth mixtape, Bigger Than Life or Death, released in July of that year and peaked at number seven on the Billboard 200. It spawned the Billboard Hot 100-charting songs "Lick Back" and "5500 Degrees" (featuring Lil Baby, 42 Dugg, and Rylo Rodriguez). His debut studio album, I Never Felt Nun (2022) was met with similar success, peaking at number eight on the Billboard 200.

== Early life ==
George Albert Stone III was born on May 11, 1994, in Louisville, Kentucky, to George and Sheila Stone. He grew up in the now demolished Clarksdale Projects before moving to Tubman Court & Ellington Avenue in the southeastern part of the city. After graduating St. Xavier High School in 2012, Stone received a football scholarship to Indiana State University and majored in communications. He spent two years there before transferring to Sac City College. After just a year he transferred again to Stephen F. Austin University. Stone dropped out of college in 2016. He was arrested for drug trafficking in the same year and was sentenced to four months of house arrest.

During 2017, he was briefly on the CFL team the Winnipeg Blue Bombers.

== Career ==
During his house arrest, Stone became motivated to pursue a rap career after watching rapper and future collaborator Lil Baby perform on TV. He initially adopted the name "Big Gee" before switching to "EST Gee", in which EST is an acronym for "Everybody Shines Together". He released his debut song "Stains" as "Big Gee" on YouTube on December 17, 2017. He continued to release consistently through YouTube, gaining himself a local fanbase. He released his first and second mixtapes El Toro and Die Bloody in June and August 2019, respectively.

EST Gee gained mainstream attention with his third mixtape Ion Feel Nun on March 6, 2020, following it up with his fourth mixtape I Still Don't Feel Nun on December 18, 2020. In January 2021, EST Gee signed a deal with Yo Gotti's Collective Music Group (CMG), Interscope Records and Warlike. He featured on Lil Baby's single "Real as It Gets", which became his first Billboard Hot 100 entry, peaking at number 34.

His fifth mixtape Bigger Than Life or Death was released on July 21, 2021. It features guest appearances from Future, Young Thug, Pooh Shiesty, and Lil Durk. He explained the meaning of the project to Audiomack: "It's just telling you what's going on. And what I got going on right now is bigger than life or death. Can't nothing affect me or stop me. Even if I die, that ain't gonna do nothing but make me bigger. I'm not dying until I make a hundred million, make that two hundred million". The mixtape debuted at number 7 on the Billboard 200 with roughly 30,000 units.

It was followed by the release of a deluxe edition, Bigger Than Life or Death, Pt. 2, on December 3, 2021, containing no features, as well as an additional three tracks on December 17 with features from Yo Gotti, Future, and Moneybagg Yo.

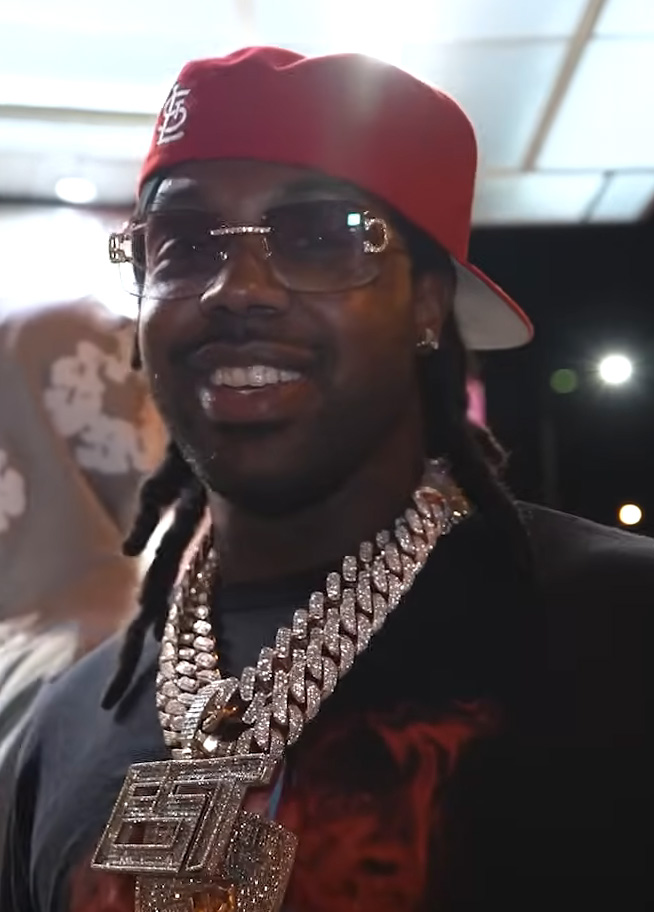
EST Gee in 2023

== Personal life ==
EST Gee's mother died in March 2020 due to leukemia and his brother died a week later in a shooting in Louisville.

EST Gee was shot five times in September 2019 following a music video shoot for his song "Taught Different", getting hit in the stomach four times and once on his left eye. His brother was hit in the leg. They were transported to a hospital and Stone was discharged after two weeks. Following surgery, Stone has retained most vision in his eye.

== Discography ==
=== Studio albums ===
List of studio albums, with selected details
Title	Album details	Peak chart positions	
Title	Album details	US	US R&B /HH
I Never Felt Nun	Released: September 16, 2022; Label: Warlike, CMG, Interscope; Format: Digital download, streaming	8	3
I Aint Feeling You	Released: January 31, 2025; Label: Warlike, CMG, Interscope; Format: Digital download, streaming	97	34
Bigger than the Devil	Released: September 11, 2026; Label: CMG, Interscope; Format: Digital download, streaming	86	28

=== Collaborative albums ===
Title	Details
Not a Chance in Hell (with Mozzy)	Released: February 20, 2026; Label: Mozzy Records, Empire, Young Shiners Entertainment; Format: Digital download, streaming

=== Compilation albums ===
Title	Details	Peak chart positions
Title	Details	US
Gangsta Art (with CMG the Label)	Released: July 15, 2022; Label: CMG, Interscope; Format: Digital download, streaming	11

=== Mixtapes ===
List of mixtapes, with selected details
Title	Mixtape details	Peak chart positions		Certifications
Title	Mixtape details	US	US R&B /HH	Certifications
El Toro	Released: June 22, 2019; Label: Self-released; Format: Digital download, streaming	—	—	
Die Bloody	Released: August 10, 2019; Label: Self-released; Format: Digital download, streaming	—	—	
Ion Feel Nun	Released: March 6, 2020; Label: Self-released; Format: Digital download, streaming	—	—	
I Still Don't Feel Nun	Released: December 18, 2020; Label: Interscope, Warlike; Format: Digital download, streaming	—	—	
Bigger Than Life or Death	Released: July 21, 2021; Label: CMG, Interscope, Warlike; Format: Digital download, streaming	7	5	RIAA: Gold
Bigger Than Life or Death, Pt. 2	Released: December 3, 2021; Label: CMG, Interscope, Warlike; Format: Digital download, streaming	65	—	
Last Ones Left (with 42 Dugg)	Released: April 8, 2022; Label: CMG, Warlike, Interscope; Format: Digital download, streaming	7	3	
Mad	Released: March 17, 2023; Label: CMG, Interscope; Format: Digital download, streaming	25	9	
El Toro 2	Released: August 18, 2023; Label: CMG, Interscope; Format: Digital download, streaming	57	—	
My World	Released: June 14, 2025; Label: Warlike, CMG, Interscope; Format: Digital download, streaming	155	45	
"—" denotes a recording that did not chart or was not released in that territory.

=== Singles ===
==== As lead artist ====
Title	Year	Peak chart positions		Certifications	Album
Title	Year	US	US R&B/HH	Certifications	Album
"Special (Remix)" (featuring Moneybagg Yo)	2020	—	—	RIAA: Gold	I Still Dont Feel Nun
"Lick Back"	2021	89	32		Bigger Than Life or Death
"Lamborghini Geeski"	2021	—	—		Bigger Than Life or Death, Pt. 2
"Free the Shiners" (with 42 Dugg)	2022	—	—		Last Ones Left
"Everybody Shooters Too" (with 42 Dugg)	2022	— (Note: "Everybody Shooters Too" did not enter the Billboard Hot 100, but peaked at number 14 on the Bubbling Under Hot 100 chart.)	47	RIAA: Gold	Last Ones Left
"Thump Shit" (with 42 Dugg)	2022	79	26	RIAA: Gold	Last Ones Left
"Shoot It Myself" (featuring Future)	2022	— (Note: "Shoot It Myself" did not enter the Billboard Hot 100, but peaked at number 10 on the Bubbling Under Hot 100 chart.)	40		I Never Felt Nun
"Backstage Passes" (featuring Jack Harlow)	2022	98	28		I Never Felt Nun
"—" denotes a recording that did not chart or was not released in that territory.

==== As featured artist ====
Title	Year	Peak chart positions			Certifications	Album
Title	Year	US	US R&B/HH	CAN	Certifications	Album
"Real as It Gets" (Lil Baby featuring EST Gee)	2021	34	17	52	RIAA: Platinum	Non-album single
"At Will" (G-Eazy featuring EST Gee)	2021	—	—	—		These Things Happen Too (Deluxe)
"Lurkin" (Mozzy featuring EST Gee)	2022	—	—	—		Survivor’s Guilt
"—" denotes a recording that did not chart or was not released in that territory.

=== Other charted songs ===
List of other charted songs, with year released, and album name shown
Title	Year	Peak chart positions				Certifications	Album
Title	Year	US	US R&B/HH	CAN	NZ Hot	Certifications	Album
"5500 Degrees" (featuring Lil Baby, 42 Dugg and Rylo Rodriguez)	2021	92	34	—	—	RIAA: Platinum	Bigger Than Life or Death
"Switches & Dracs" (Moneybagg Yo featuring Lil Durk and EST Gee)	2021	69	25	—	—		A Gangsta's Pain
"Ice Talk" (with 42 Dugg)	2022	— (Note: "Ice Talk" did not enter the Billboard Hot 100, but peaked at number 21 on the Bubbling Under Hot 100 chart.)	—	—	—		Last Ones Left
"Chickens" (Future featuring EST Gee)	2022	26	15	62	—		I Never Liked You
"Back and Forth" (with Lil Baby)	2022	68	30	—	—		It's Only Me
"Ball Like Me Too"	2023	—	49	—	—		Mad
