= Rylo Rodriguez =

American rapper (born 1993)

- Born: Ryan Preston Dunnell Adams; September 30, 1993 (age 33); Mobile, Alabama, U.S.
- Genres: Southern hip-hop; trap
- Occupations: Rapper; songwriter
- Years active: 2018–present
- Labels: Glass Window; Virgin; Motown

Ryan Preston Dunnell Adams (born September 30, 1993), known professionally as Rylo Rodriguez, is an American rapper. He signed with Lil Baby's record label, Glass Window Entertainment (known at the time as 4PF) in a joint venture with Virgin Records in February 2020. He first gained recognition for his collaborations with the rapper, and released his debut studio album, G.I.H.F. (Goat In Human Form) in November of that year. It peaked within the top 40 of the Billboard 200, while his second album, Been One (2023) peaked within the top ten and was supported by the single "Thang for You" (featuring NoCap)—his first entry on the Billboard Hot 100 as a lead artist.

== Early life ==
Ryan Preston Adams was born in 1993 in Mobile, Alabama. He grew up in the Roger Williams Housing Projects and was raised by his grandfather, who took care of him along with his mother, sister, and two brothers.

== Career ==
Adams began his career in music featuring for Lil Baby on his hit singles "Eat Or Starve" and "Stick On Me". Some of his early music involved flipping classic pop and R&B songs and recontexualizing them into stories of his life, such as "Project Baby", based on Mariah Carey's "Always Be My Baby", and "Valentines", sampling from Tamia's "Can't Get Enough". In 2018, he released Rogerville, a collaborative mixtape with fellow Mobile rapper NoCap.

In 2020, Rylo Rodriguez was signed to American rapper Lil Baby's record label 4 Pockets Full (4PF) and Virgin Music, and featured on "Forget That" in his album My Turn. He released his debut album G.I.H.F. (Goat In Human Form) on November 27, 2020, subsequently reaching number 2 on the Rolling Stone Breakthrough 25 and number 48 on the Rolling Stone Artists 500.

In 2021, Rylo Rodriguez was featured on American rapper EST Gee's song "5500 Degrees", along with Lil Baby and 42 Dugg. It peaked at number 92 on the Billboard Hot 100, becoming Rodriguez's first song to chart.

== Discography ==
=== Studio albums ===
List of studio albums with selected chart positions.
Title	Album details	Peak chart positions				Certifications
Title	Album details	US	US R&B/HH	US Rap	US Ind.	Certifications
G.I.H.F.	Released: November 27, 2020; Label: 4PF; Formats: Digital download, streaming	37	14	11	7	
Been One	Released: June 30, 2023; Label: Glass Window; Formats: Digital download, streaming	10	4	3	2	RIAA: Gold
S.K.A.T.E.	Released: July 3, 2026; Label: Glass Window, Motown; Formats: Digital download, streaming	13	5	3	—	

=== Mixtapes ===
Title	Mixtape details
Rogerville (with NoCap)	Released: April 19, 2019; Label: Self-released; Format: Digital download, streaming
Gift from the Ghetto	Released: May 24, 2019; Label: Self-released; Format: Digital download, streaming
Before the Album	Released: November 8, 2019; Label: Self-released; Format: Digital download, streaming
Sorry Four the Delay	Released: March 23, 2023; Label: 4PF; Format: Digital download, streaming

=== Singles ===
Title	Year	Peak chart positions			Certifications	Album
Title	Year	US	US R&B/HH	US Rap	Certifications	Album
"For Me" (featuring Yo Gotti)	2020	—	—	—		G.I.H.F.
"Set Me Free"	2022	—	—	—	RIAA: Gold	Non-album single
"Thang for You" (featuring NoCap)	2023	91	25	17	RIAA: Platinum	Been One
"F*cked a Fan" (with Veeze)	2024	—	45	—	RIAA: Gold	Non-album singles
"One of Them Ones" (with Veeze and Lil Baby)	2026	—	50	—		Non-album singles

=== Other charted and certified songs ===
Title	Year	Peak chart positions				Certifications	Album
Title	Year	US	US R&B/HH	US Rap	WW	Certifications	Album
"No Friends" (Lil Baby featuring Rylo Rodriguez)	2018	— (Note: "No Friends" did not enter the Billboard Hot 100, but peaked at number 17 on the Bubbling Under Hot 100 chart.)	—	—	—	RIAA: Gold	Street Gossip
"Forget That" (with Lil Baby)	2020	— (Note: "Forget That" did not enter the Billboard Hot 100, but peaked at number 11 on the Bubbling Under Hot 100 chart.)	—	—	—	RIAA: Gold	My Turn
"No Chill" (Moneybagg Yo featuring Lil Baby and Rylo Rodriguez)	2020	—	—	—	—	RIAA: Gold	Time Served (Deluxe)
"Walk" (featuring Lil Baby and 42 Dugg)	2020	—	—	—	—	RIAA: Gold	G.I.H.F.
"5500 Degrees" (EST Gee featuring Lil Baby, 42 Dugg and Rylo Rodriguez)	2021	92	34	—	—	RIAA: Platinum	Bigger than Life or Death
"Cost to Be Alive" (with Lil Baby)	2022	57	25	21	132		It's Only Me
"Unfuckwitable"	2023	—	—	—	—	RIAA: Gold	Been One
"Taylor Port Junkie" (featuring Lil Yachty)	2023	—	38	—	—	RIAA: Gold	Been One
"Equal Dirt"	2023	100	28	20	—	RIAA: Gold	Been One
"End of the Road"	2023	—	—	—	—	RIAA: Gold	Been One
"Jersey Numbers" (Rod Wave featuring Rylo Rodriguez)	2024	— (Note: "Jersey Numbers" did not enter the Billboard Hot 100, but peaked at number 15 on the Bubbling Under Hot 100 chart.)	—	—	—		Last Lap
"By Myself" (with Lil Baby featuring Rod Wave)	2025	44	10	8	169		WHAM
"Stir"	2026	—	47	—	—		S.K.A.T.E.
"Neighborhood Starz" (with Lil Baby and Kevin Gates)	2026	— (Note: "Neighborhood Starz" did not enter the Billboard Hot 100, but peaked at number 16 on the Bubbling Under Hot 100 chart.)	37	—	—		S.K.A.T.E.

=== Guest appearances ===
List of non-single guest appearances, with other performing artists, showing year released and album name
Title	Year	Other performer(s)	Album
"How We Roll"	2018	NoCap	—N/a
"No Friends"	2018	Lil Baby	Street Gossip
"No Sleep"	2019	Ralo	Free Ralo
"Amber Rolls"	2021	Kodak Black, Yo Gotti, Lil Keed	Happy Birthday Kodak
"Still Miss My N*ggas"	2021	42 Dugg	Free Dem Boyz
"5500 Degrees"	2021	EST Gee, Lil Baby, 42 Dugg	Bigger than Life or Death
"Cost to Be Alive"	2022	Lil Baby	It's Only Me
"Witchcraft"	2023	Trippie Redd	Mansion Musik
"Invoice"	2024	NoCap	Before I Disappear Again
"Greece or Sweden"	2024	NoCap	Before I Disappear Again
"Jersey Numbers"	2024	Rod Wave	Last Lap
"By Myself"	2025	Lil Baby, Rod Wave	WHAM
"Da Fuck"	2025	Tezzus, Young Thug	UY Scuti Bøyz
