= List of African-American singers =

This is a list of notable African-American singers that gives their year of birth and music genres with which they are associated.

== List of singers, rappers, and musicians ==
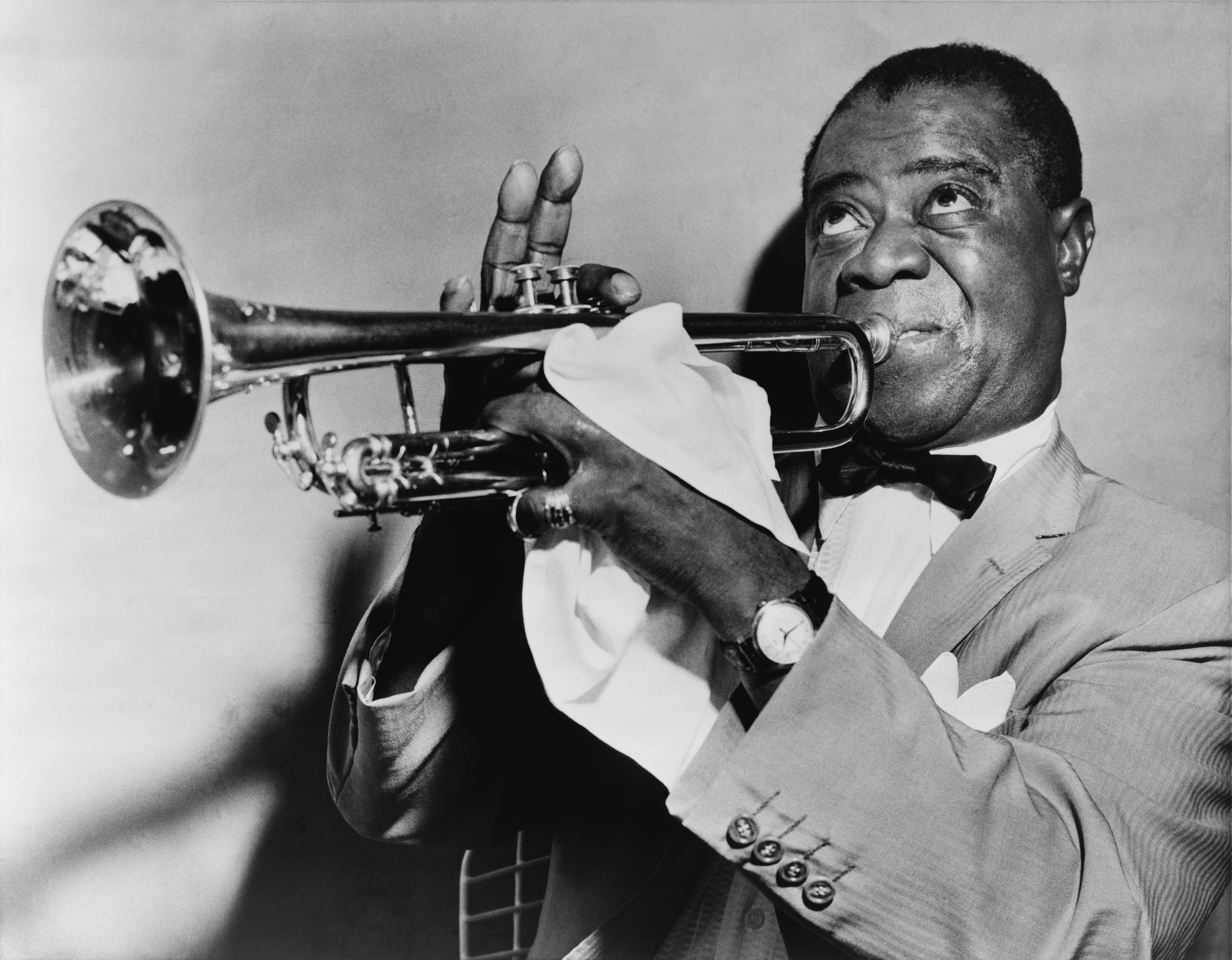
Louis Armstrong

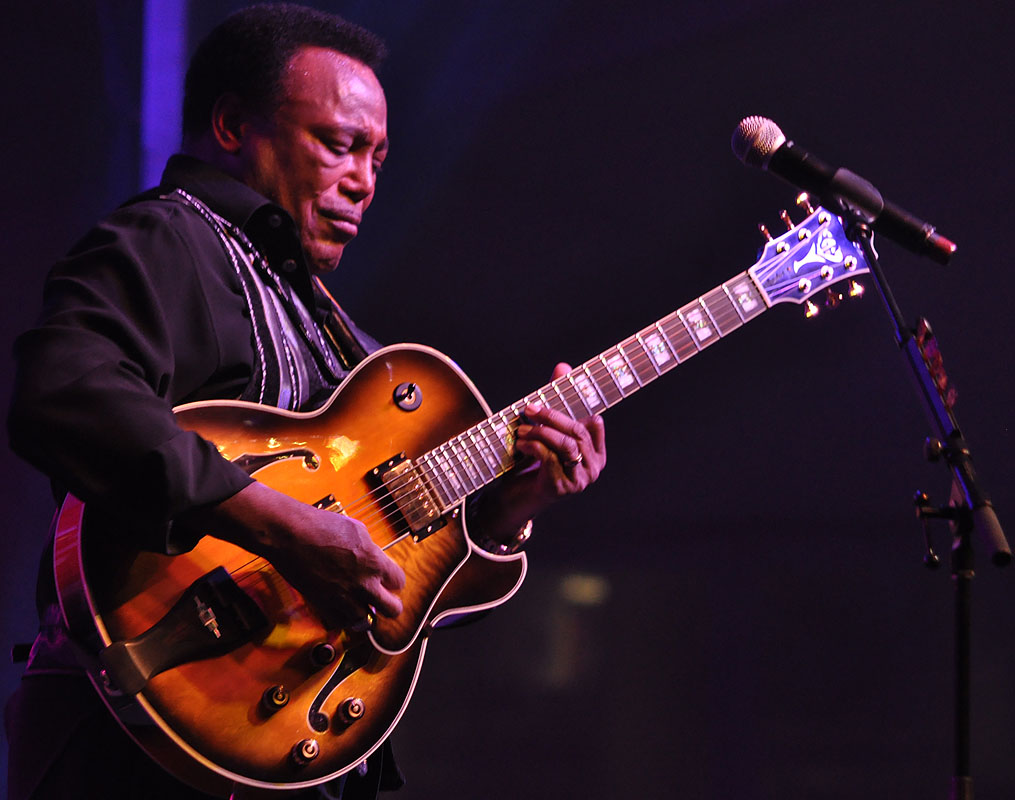
George Benson

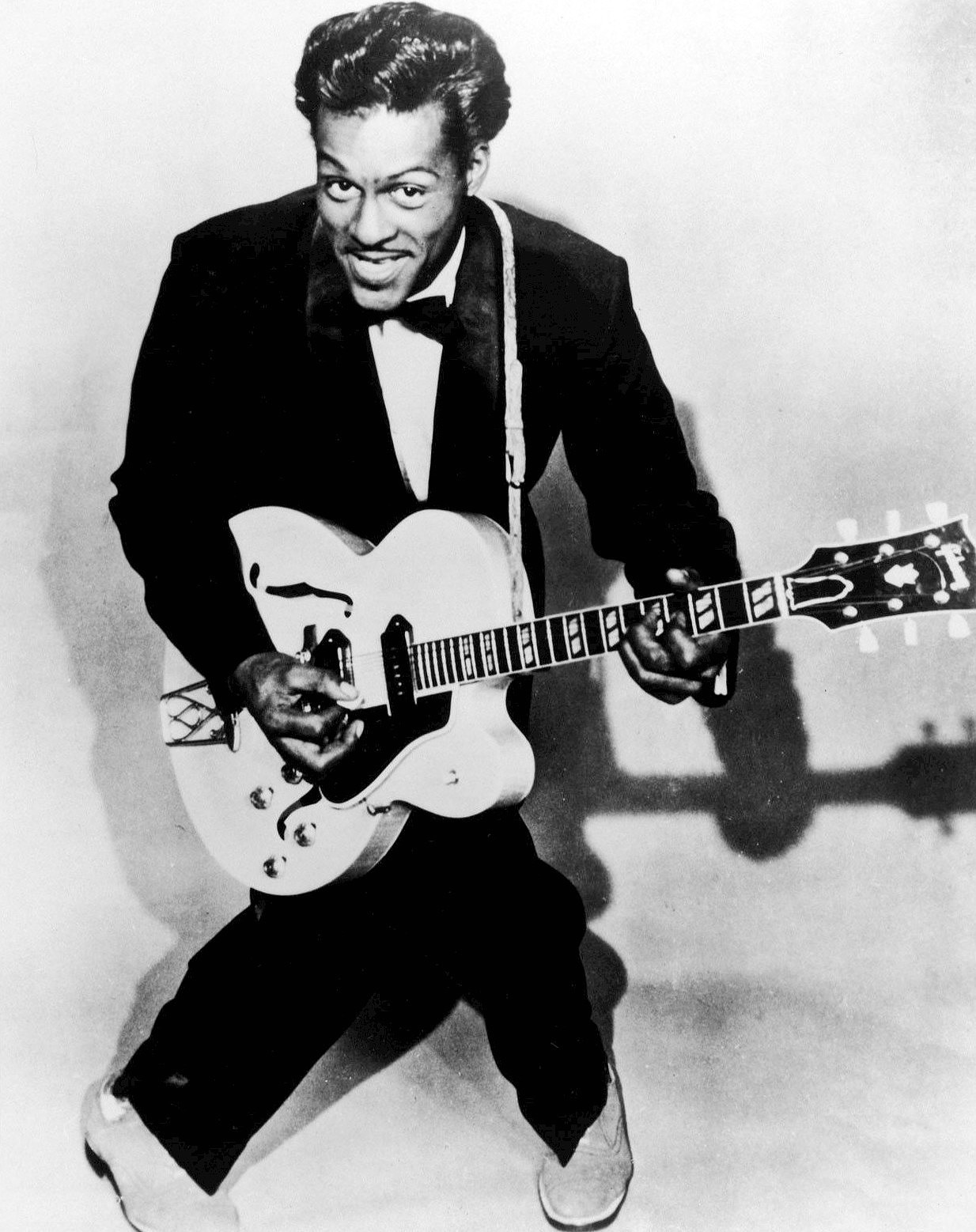
Chuck Berry

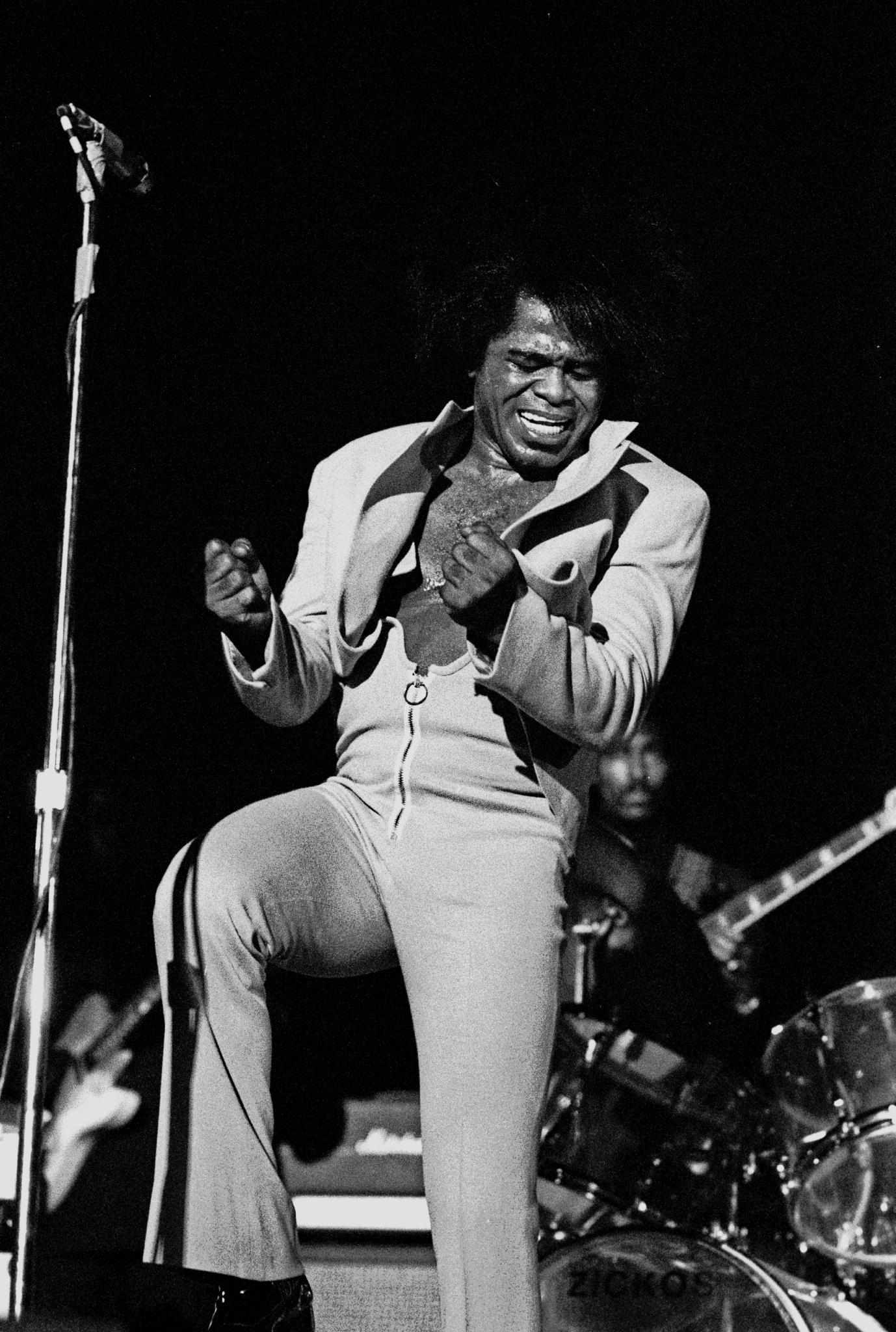
James Brown

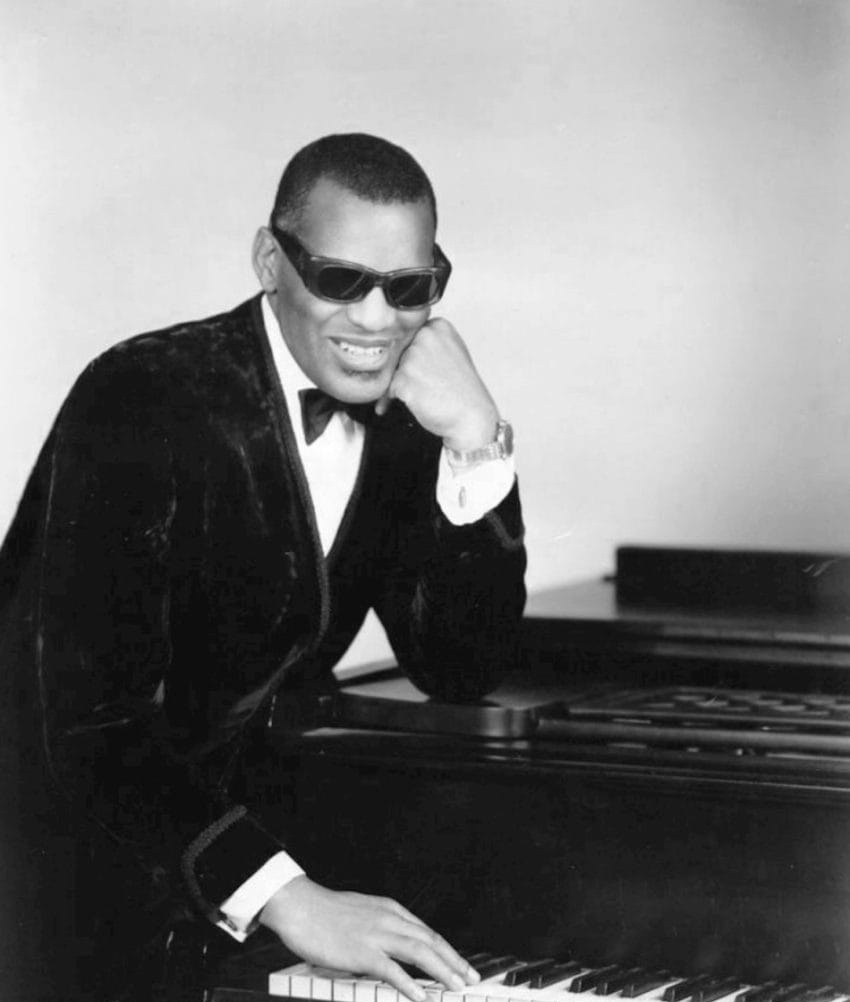
Ray Charles

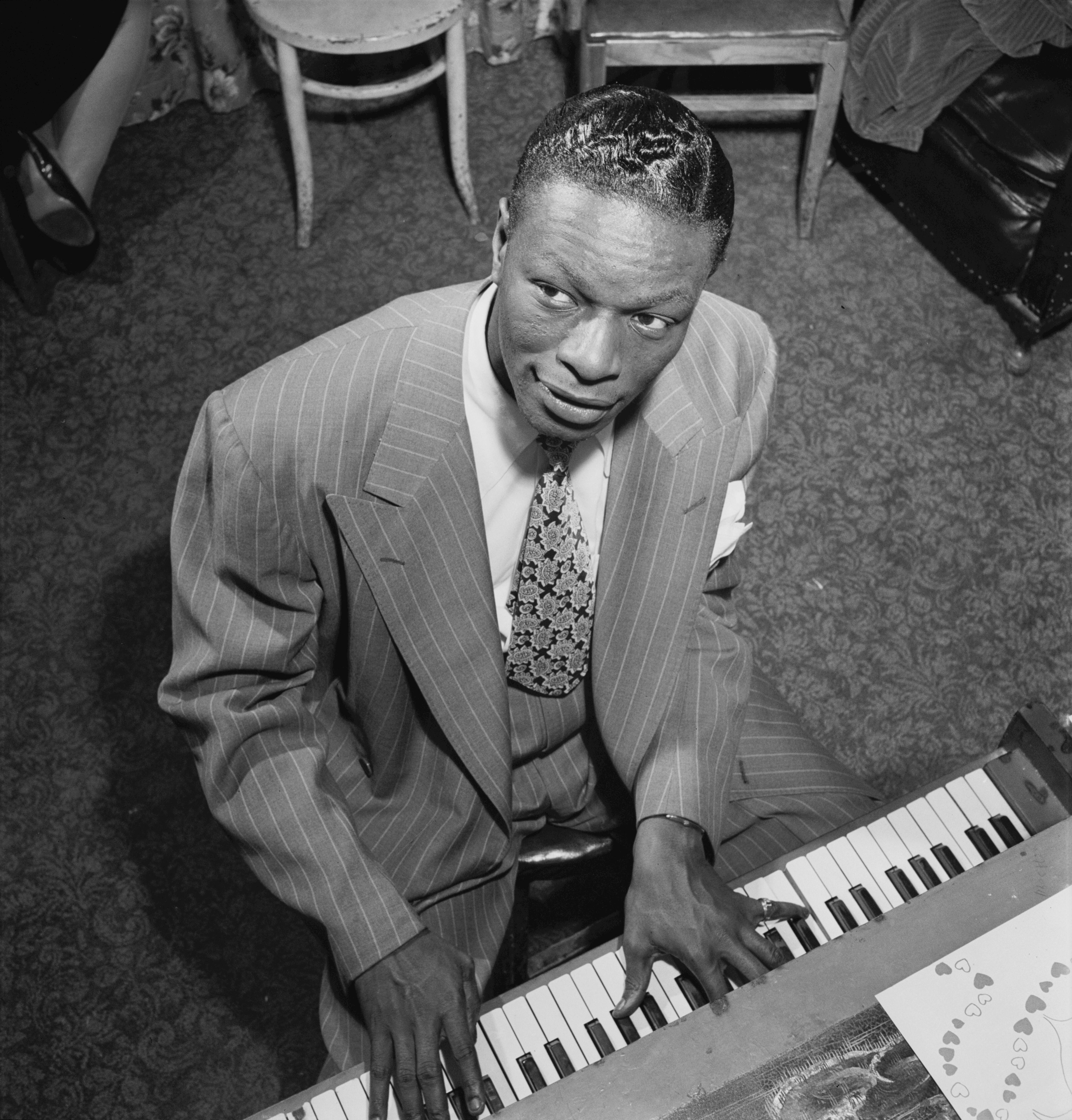
Nat King Cole

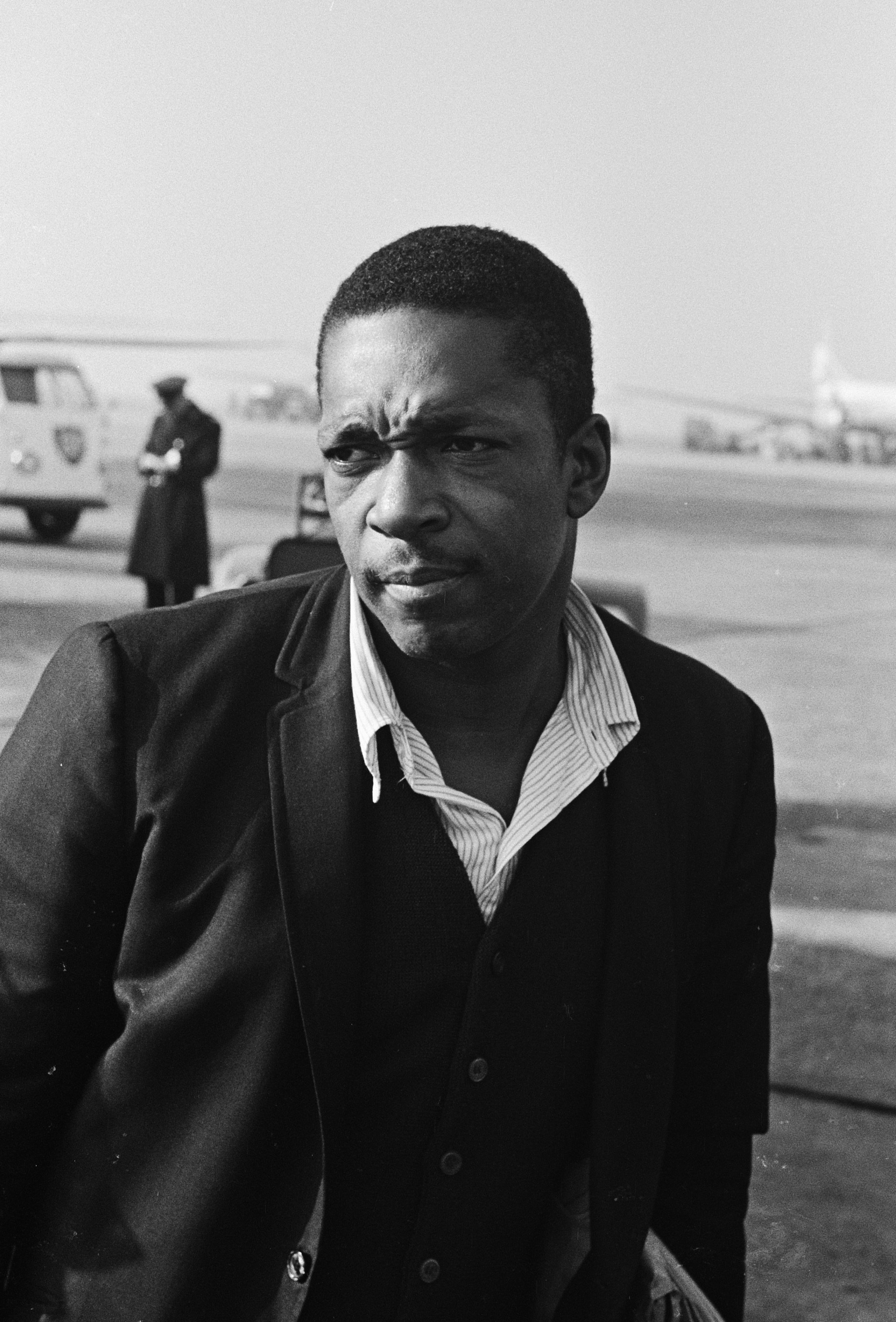
John Coltrane

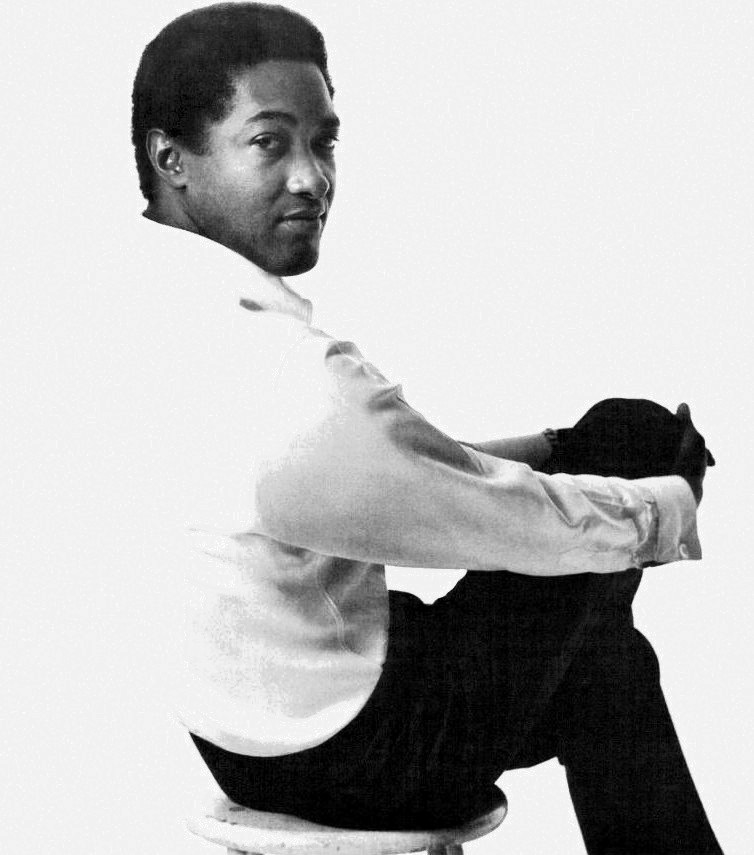
Sam Cooke

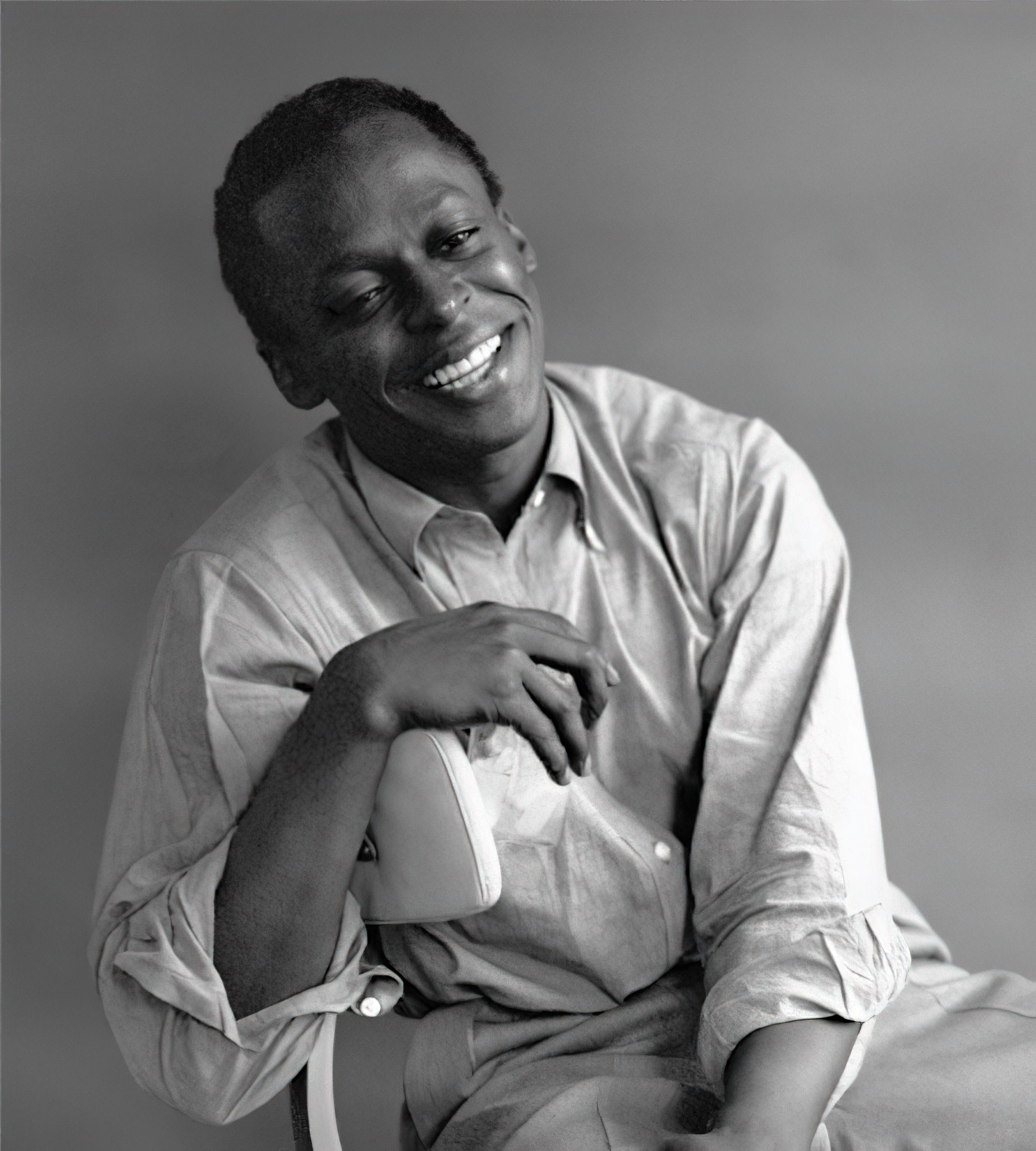
Miles Davis

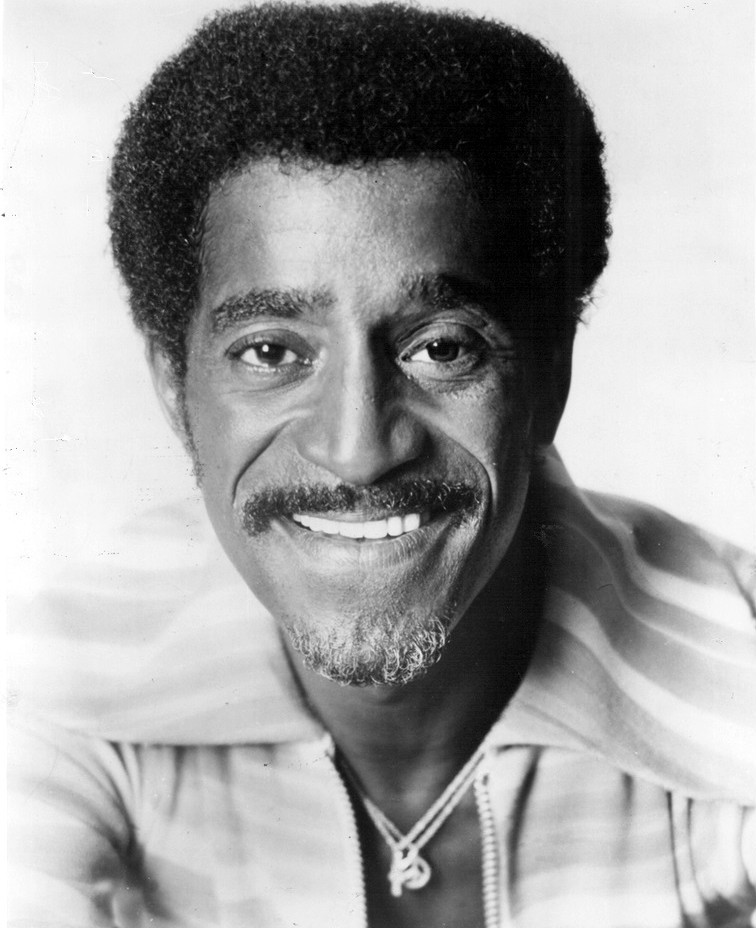
Sammy Davis Jr.

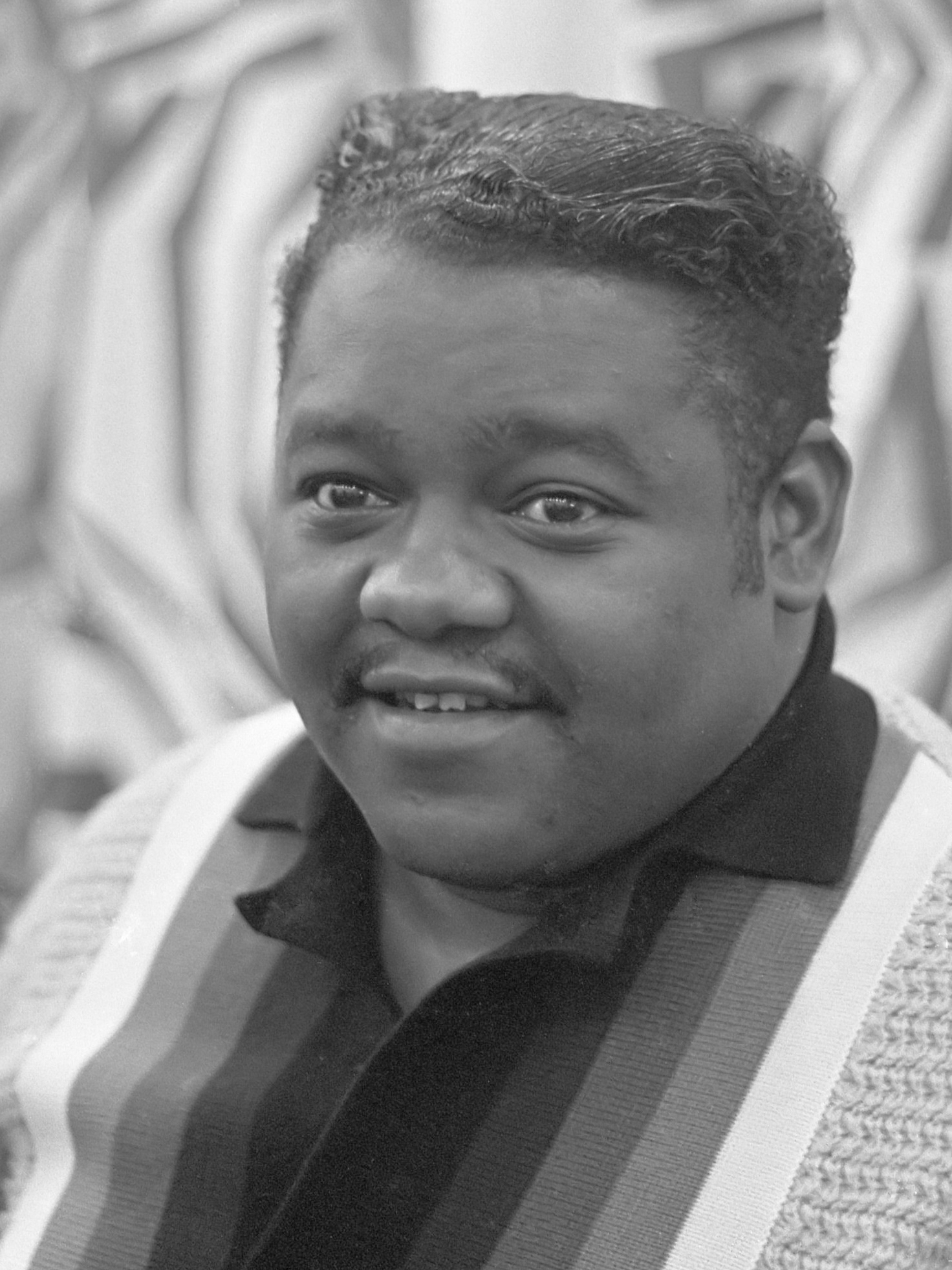
Fats Domino

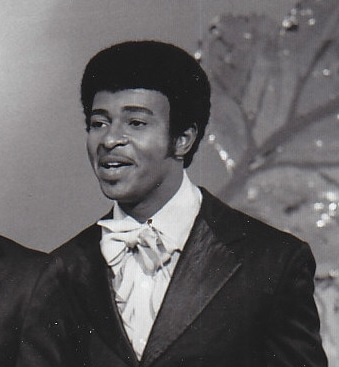
Dennis Edwards

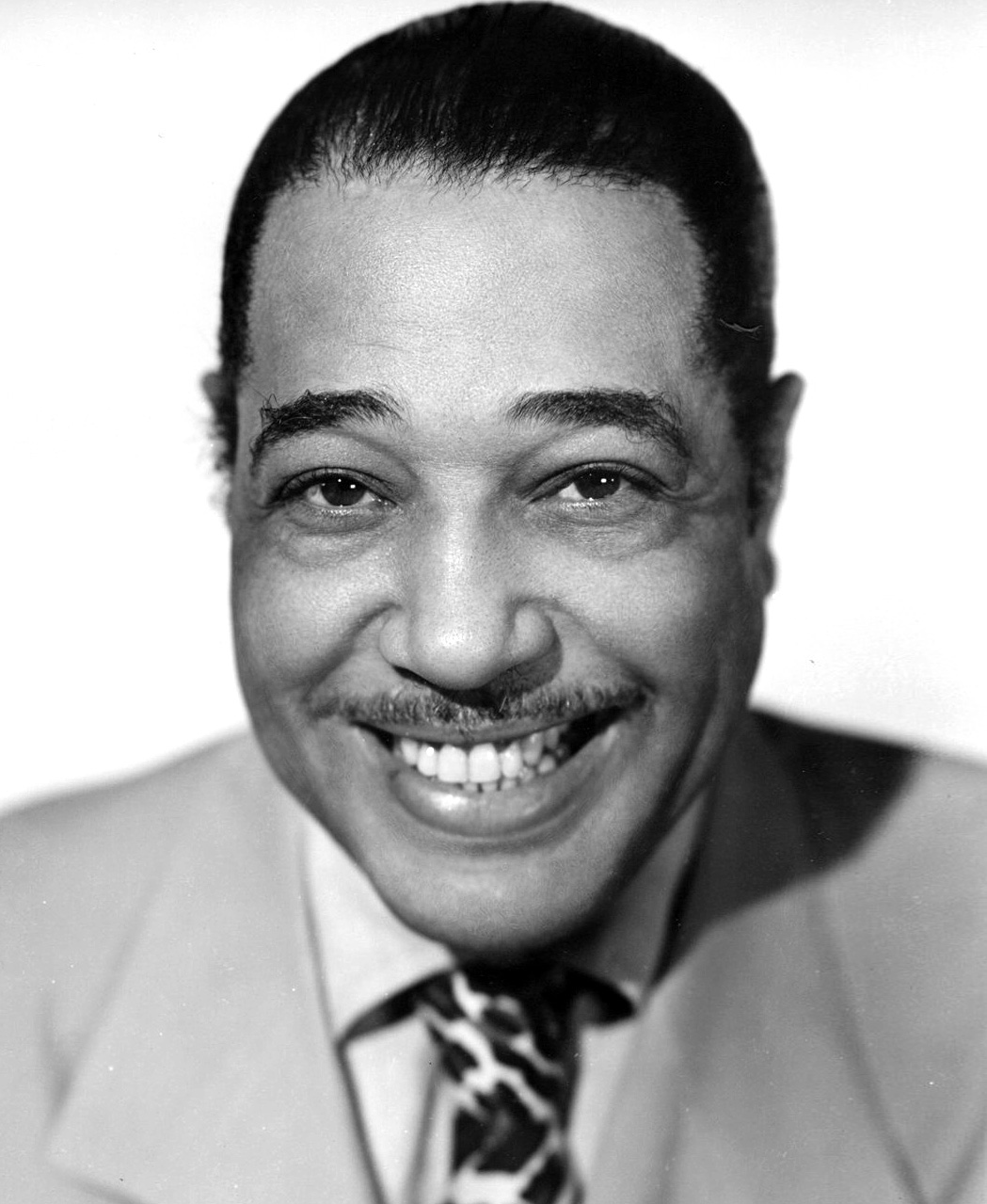
Duke Ellington

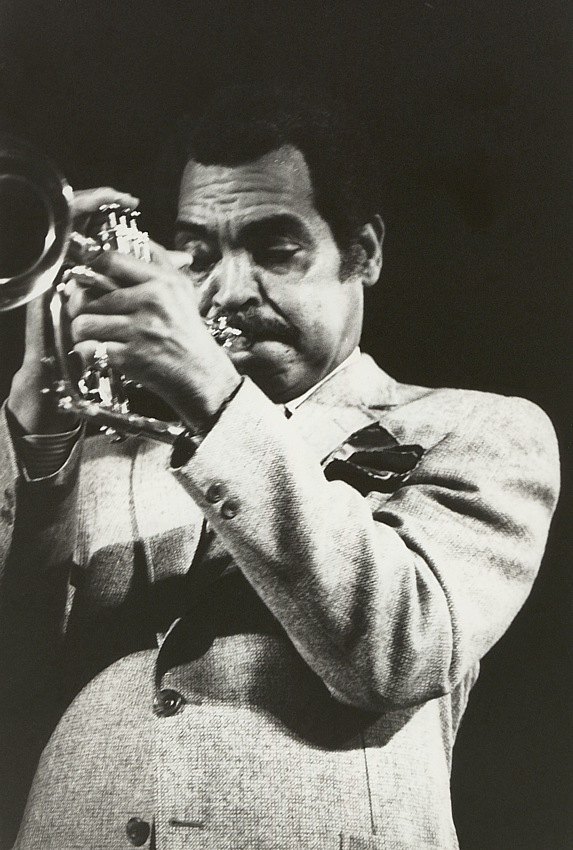
Art Farmer

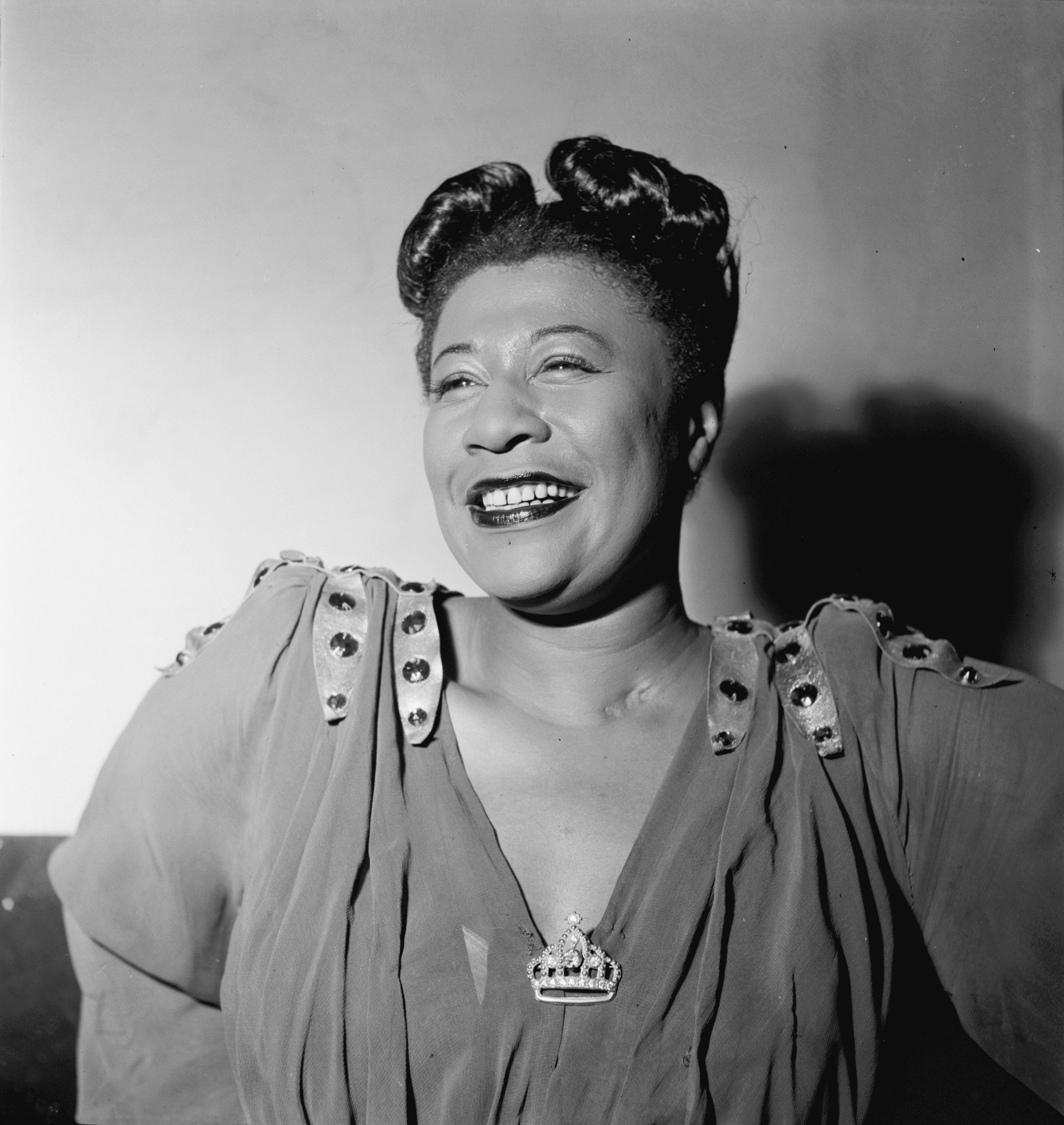
Ella Fitzgerald

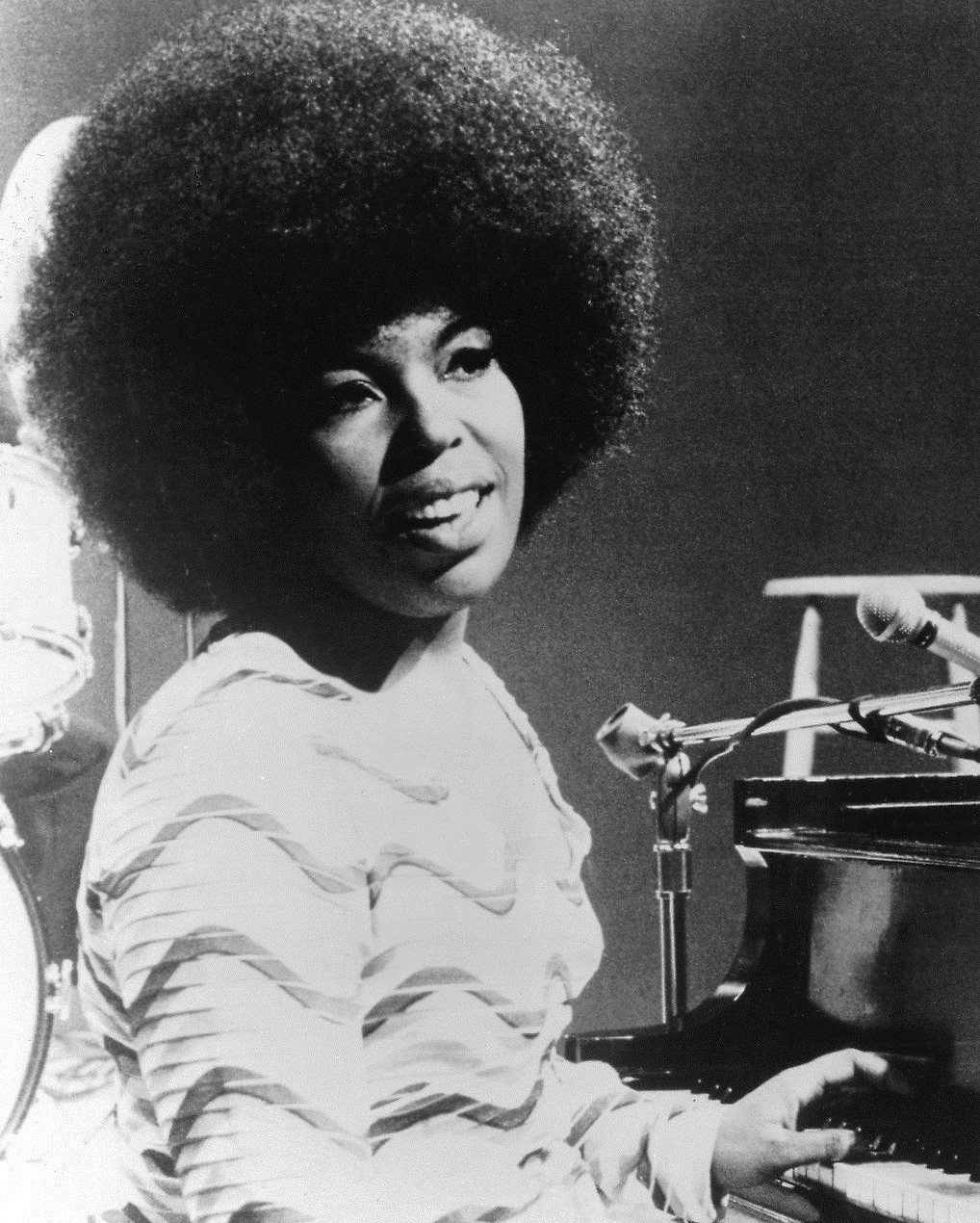
Roberta Flack

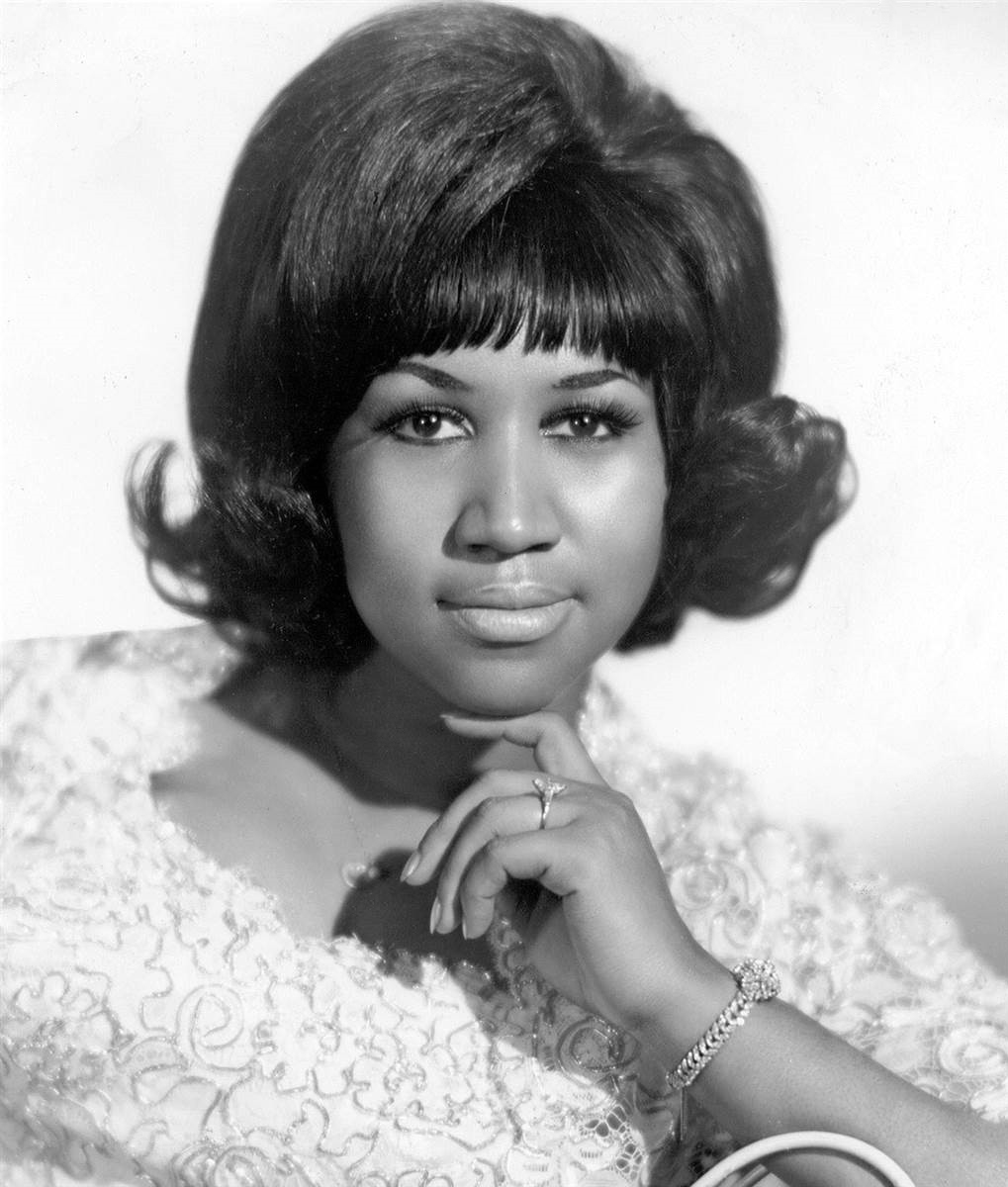
Aretha Franklin

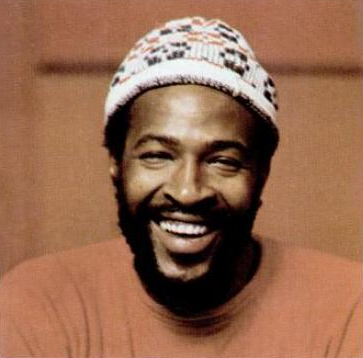
Marvin Gaye

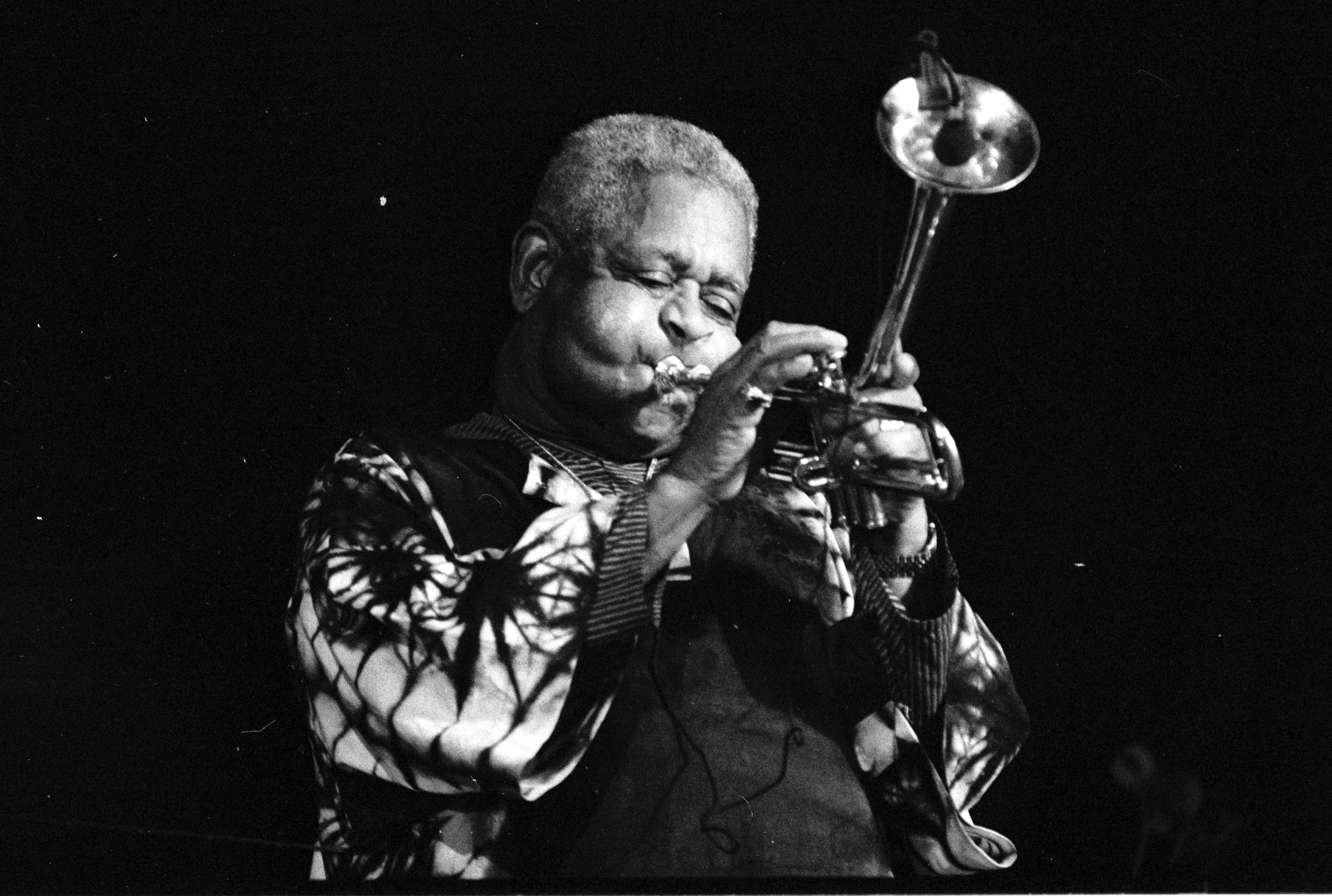
Dizzy Gillespie

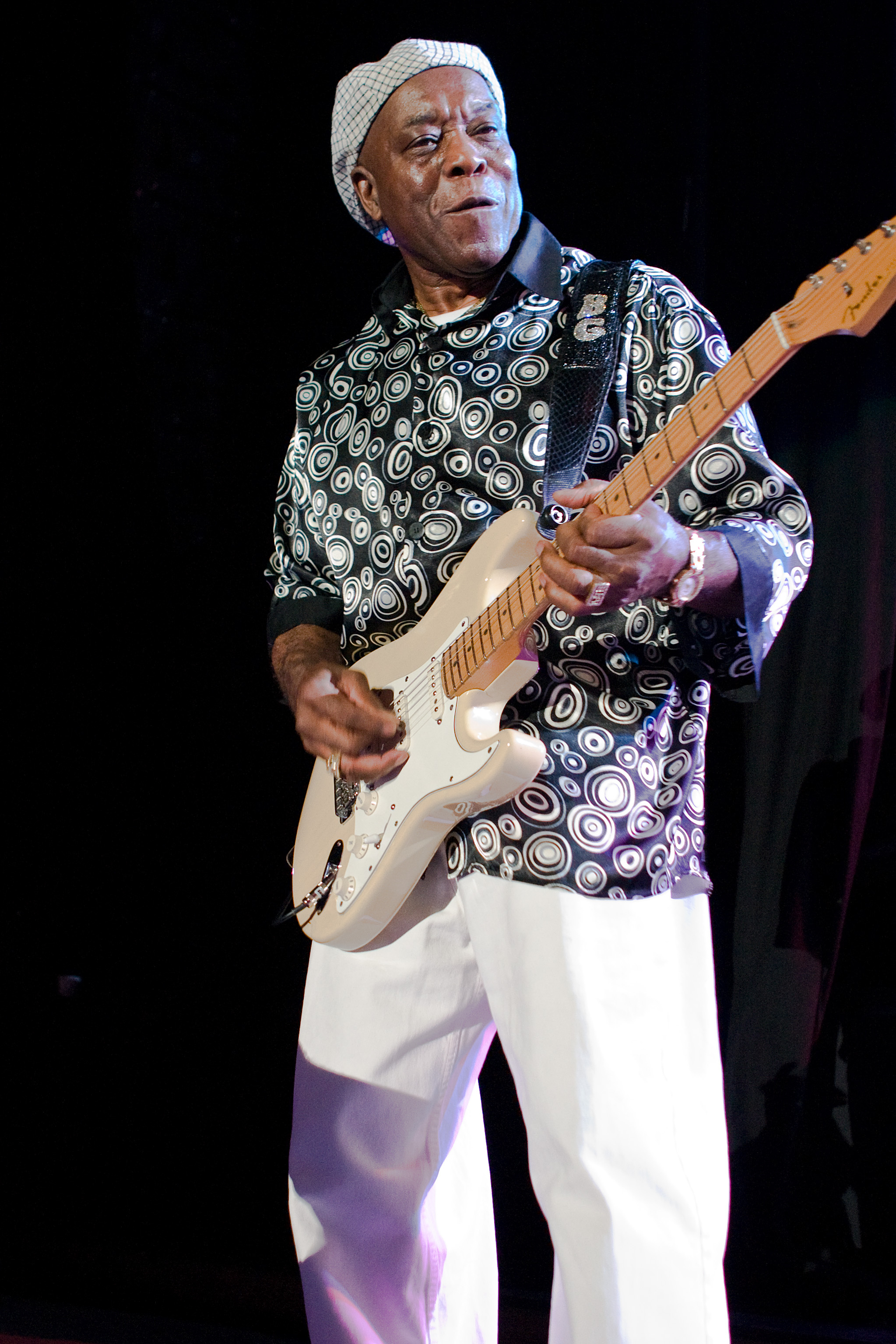
Buddy Guy

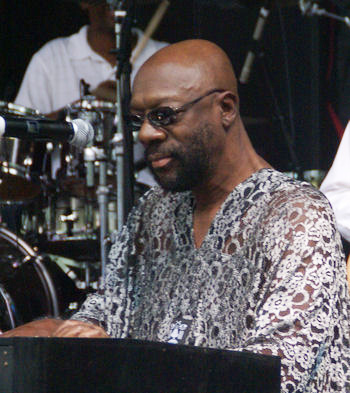
Isaac Hayes

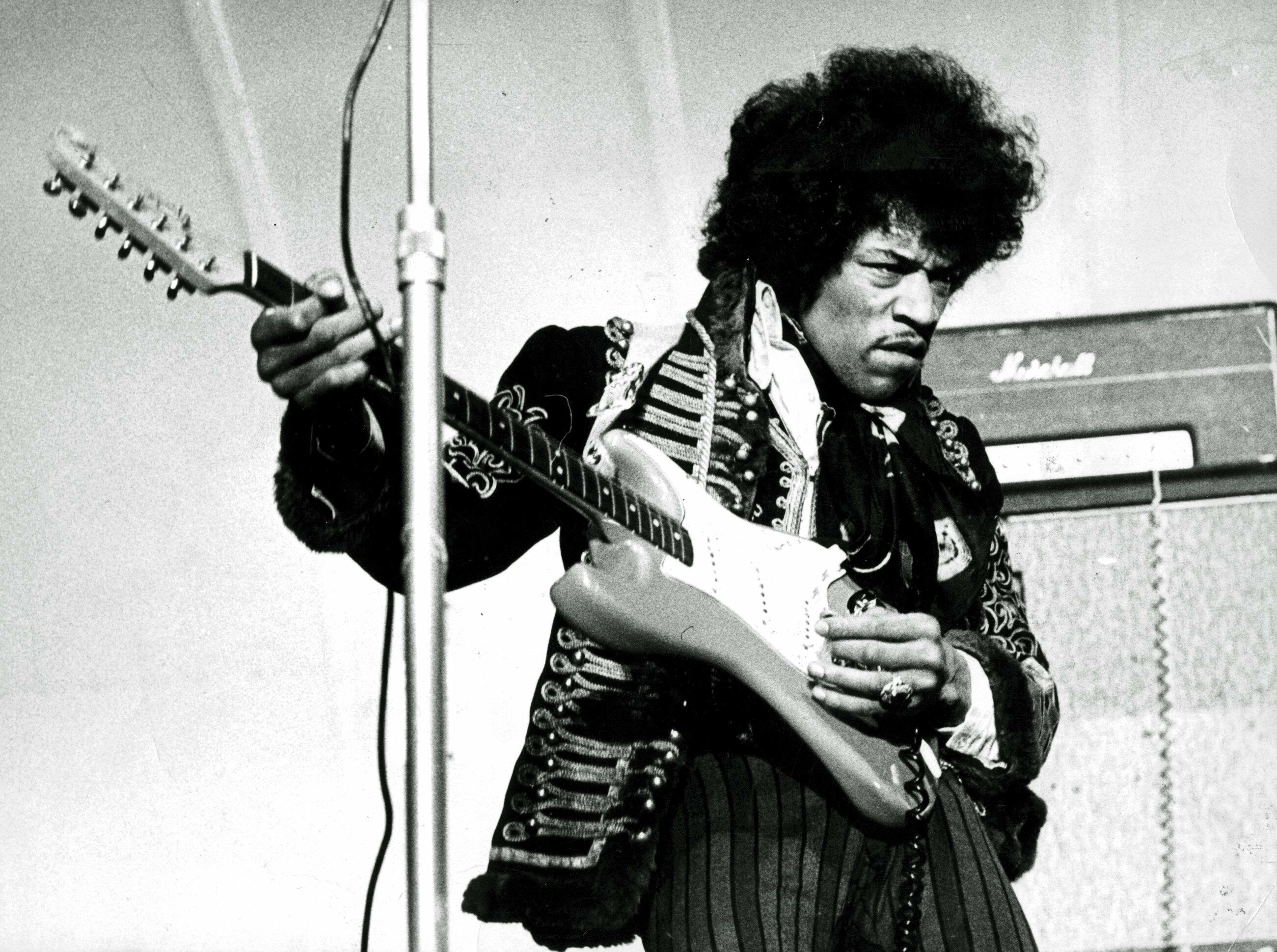
Jimi Hendrix

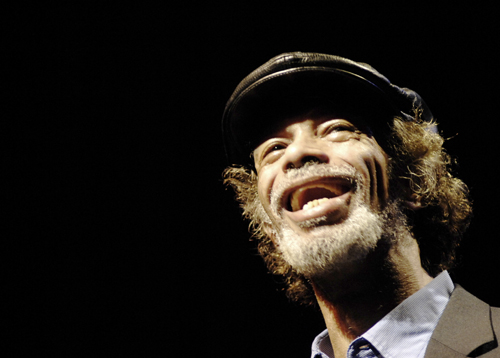
Gil Scott-Heron

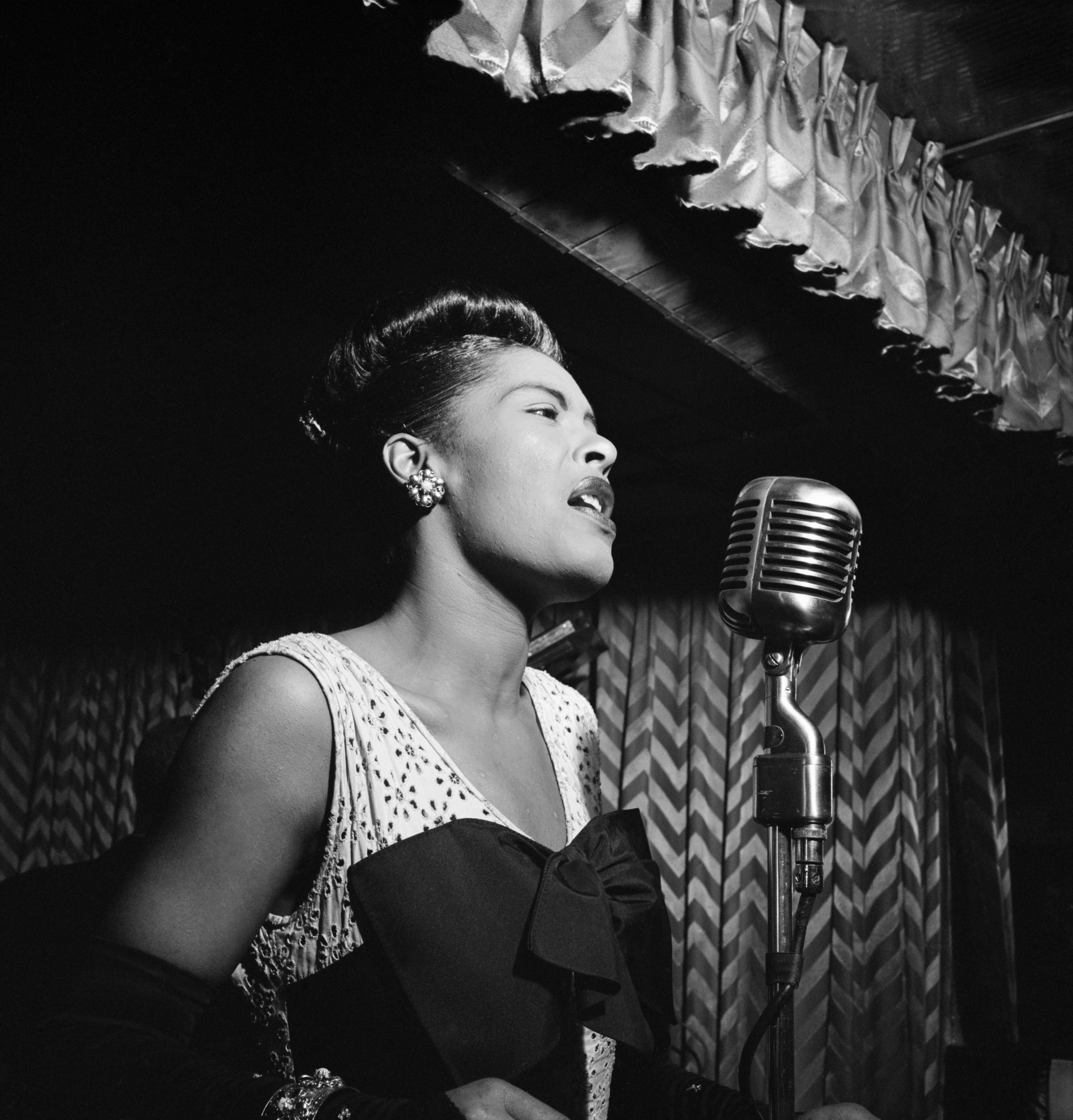
Billie Holiday

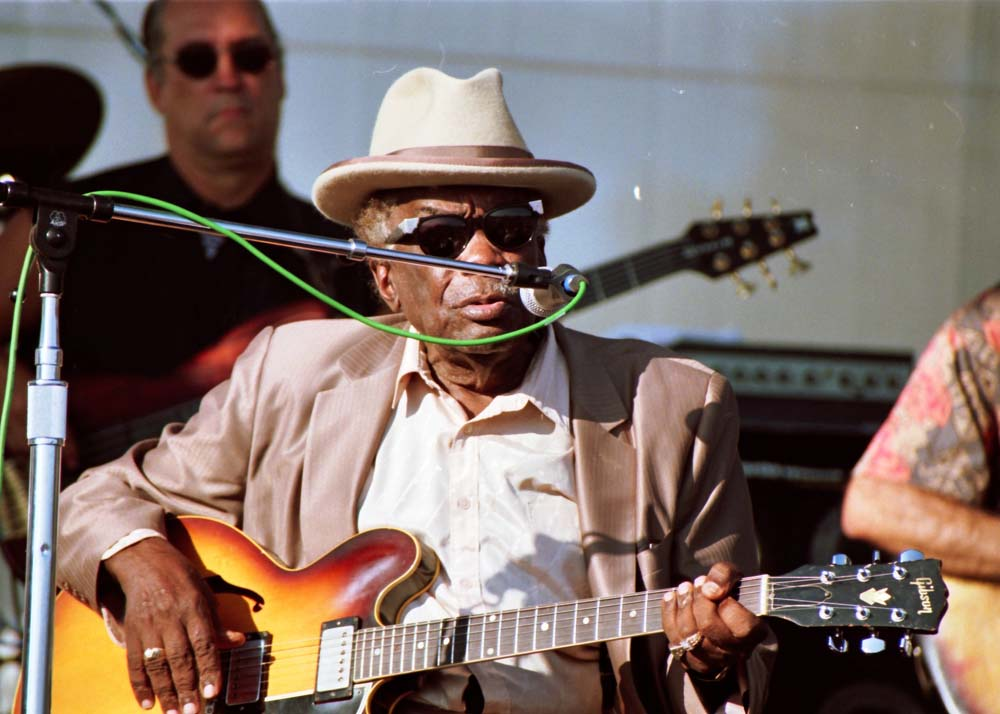
John Lee Hooker

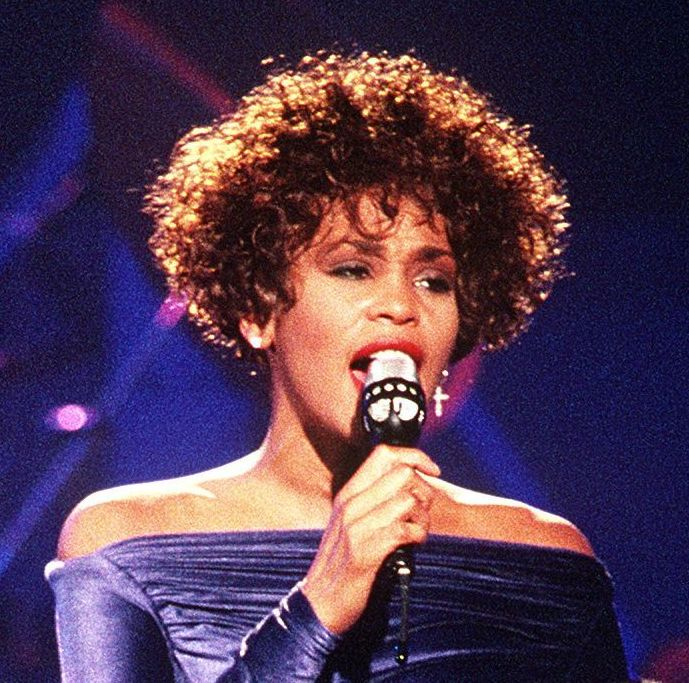
Whitney Houston

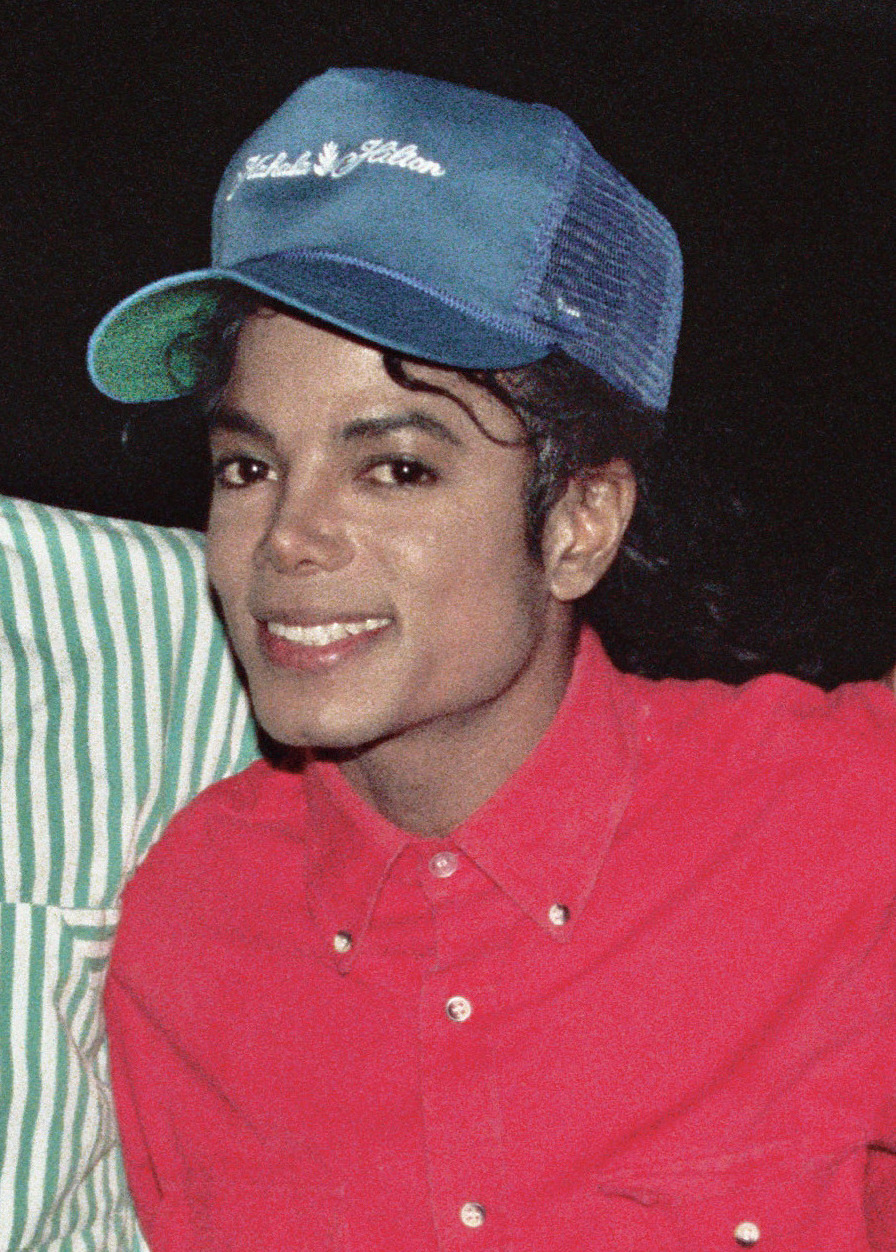
Michael Jackson

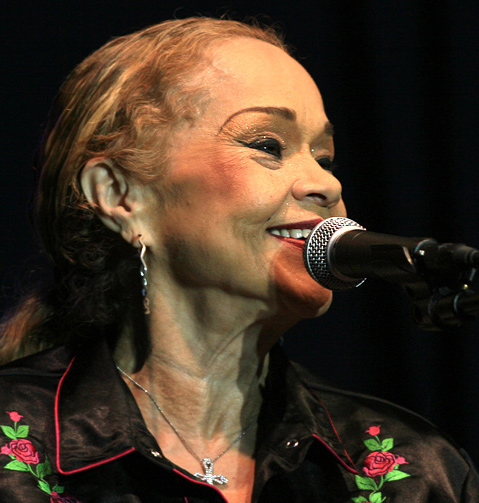
Etta James

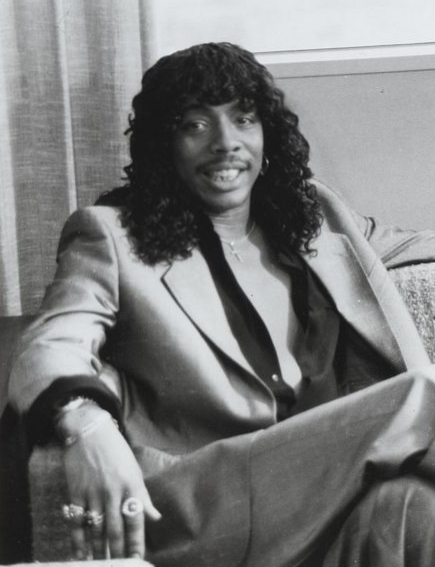
Rick James

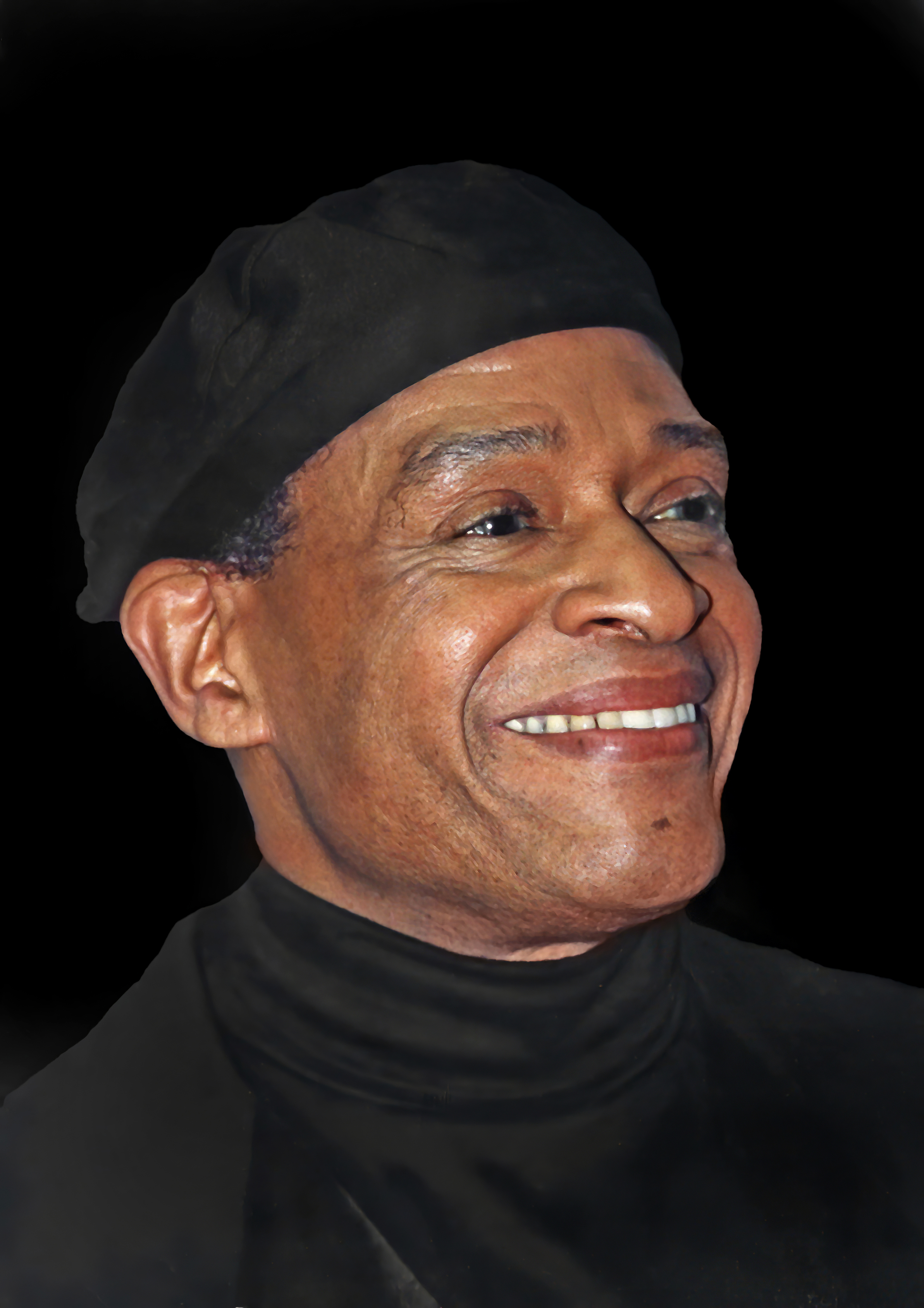
Al Jarreau

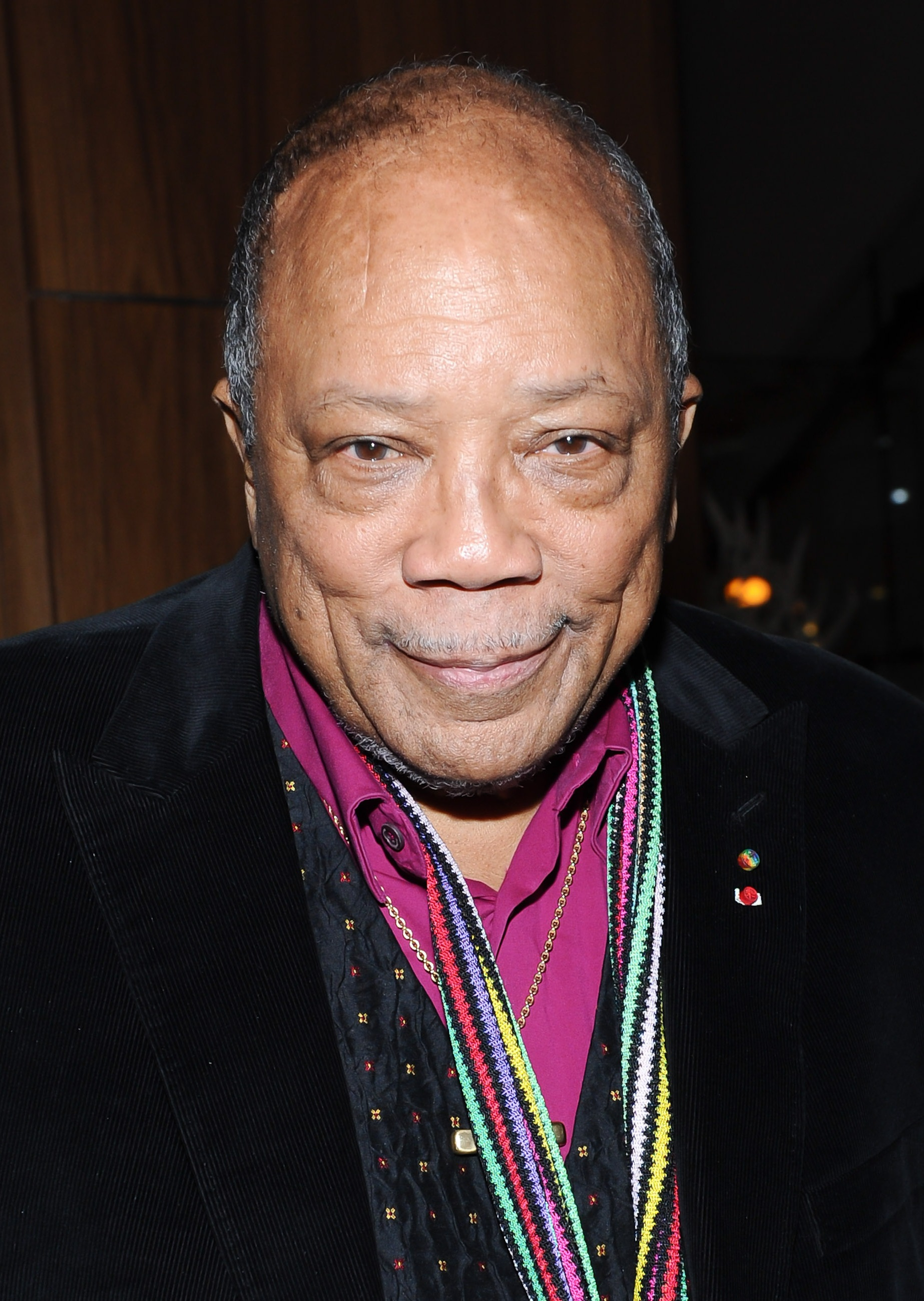
Quincy Jones

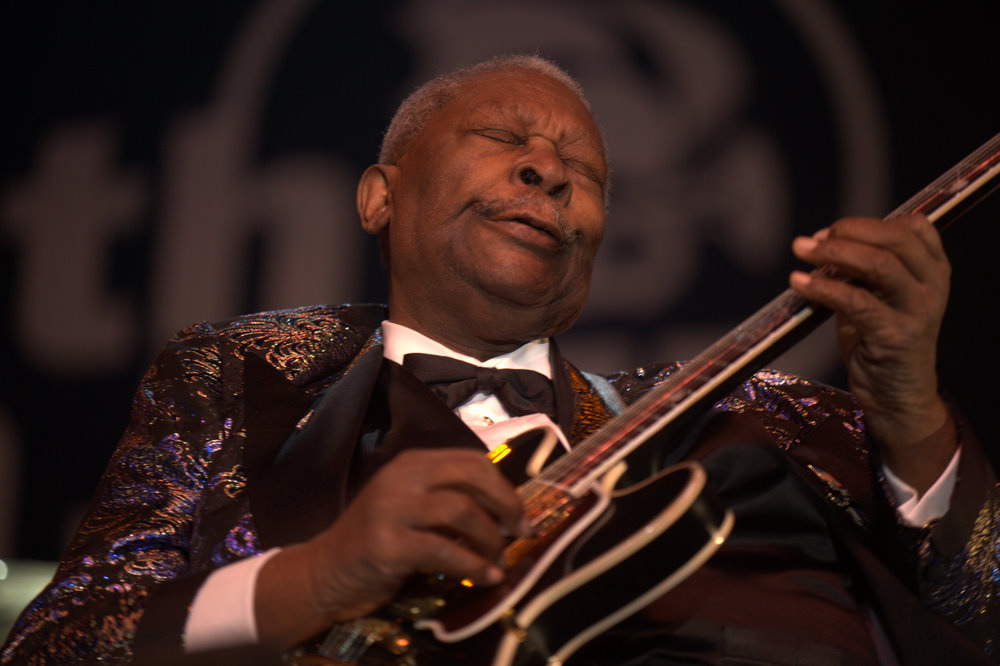
B.B. King

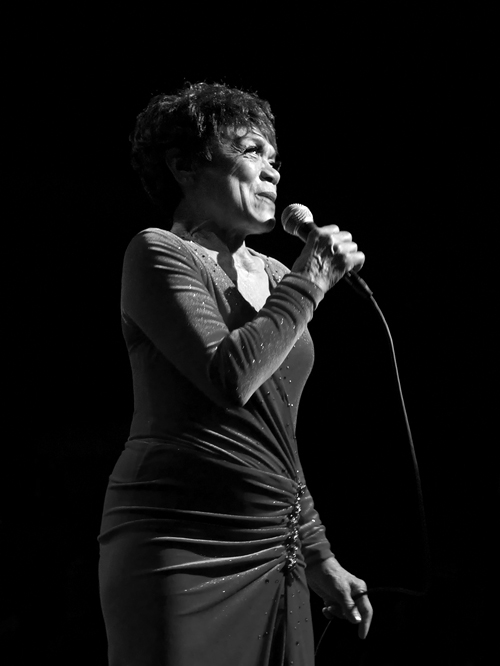
Eartha Kitt

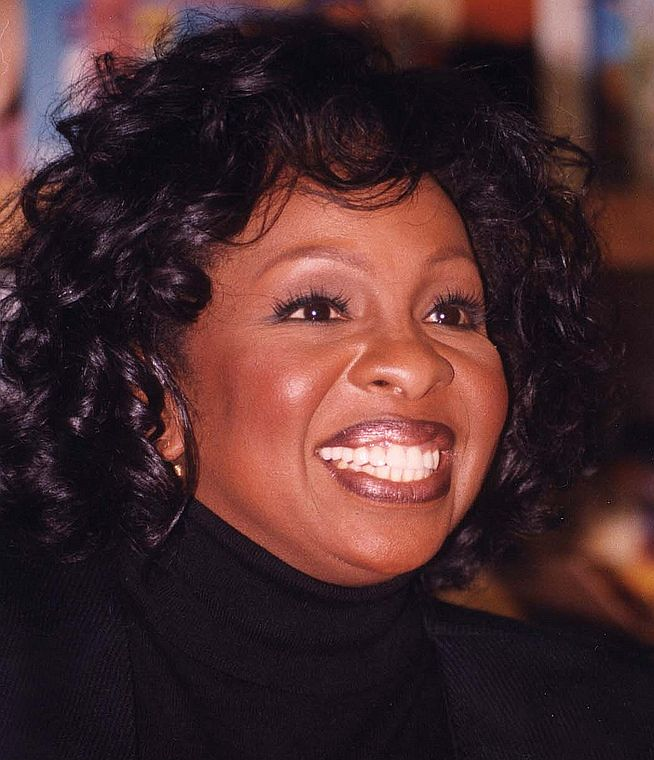
Gladys Knight

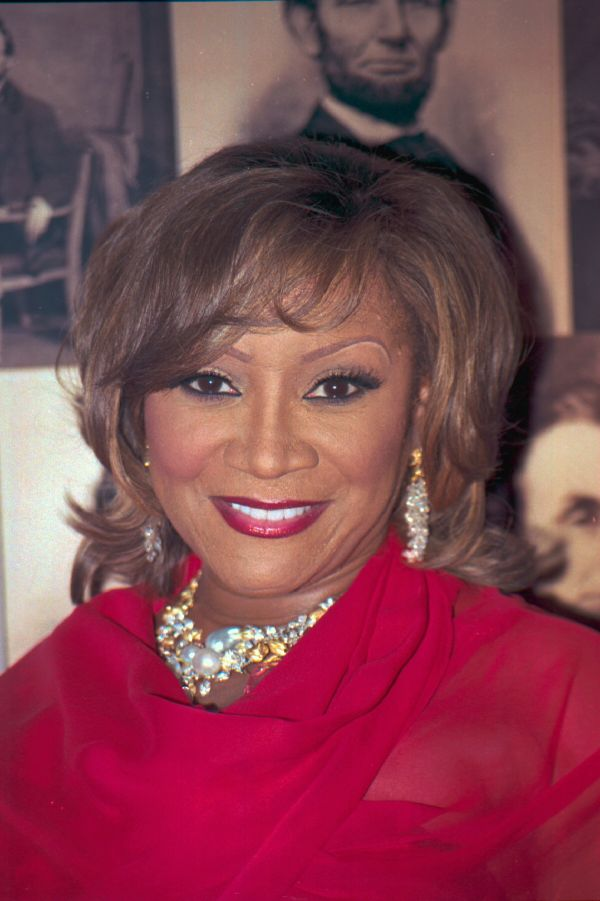
Patti LaBelle

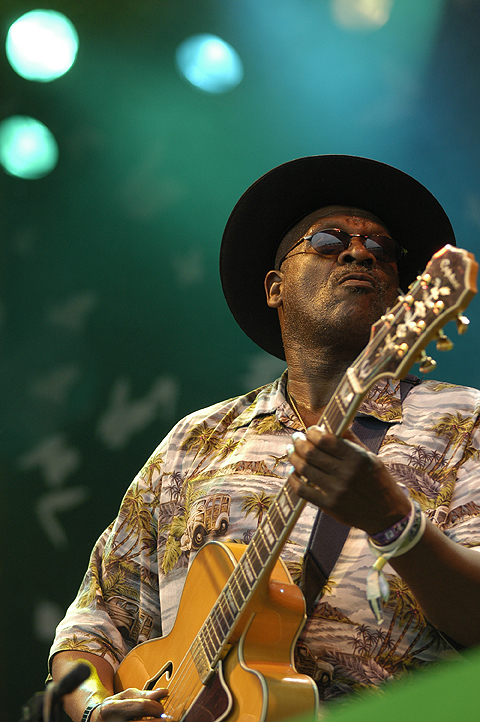
Taj Mahal

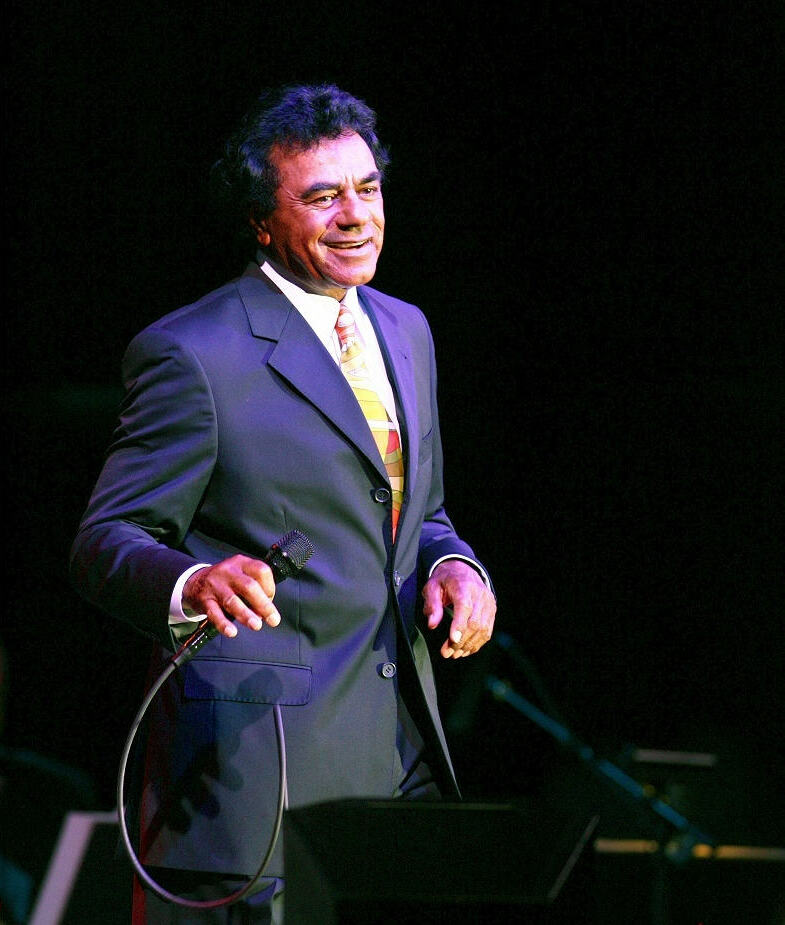
Johnny Mathis

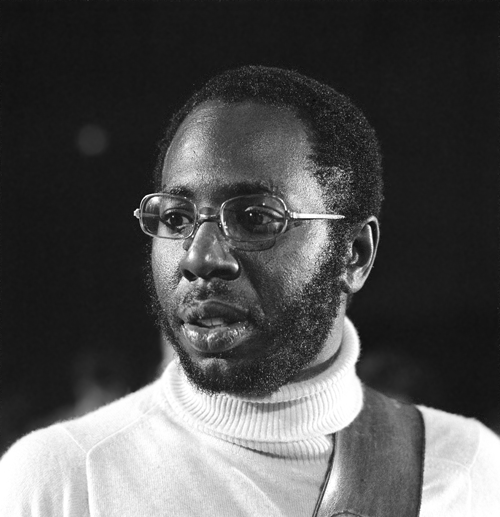
Curtis Mayfield

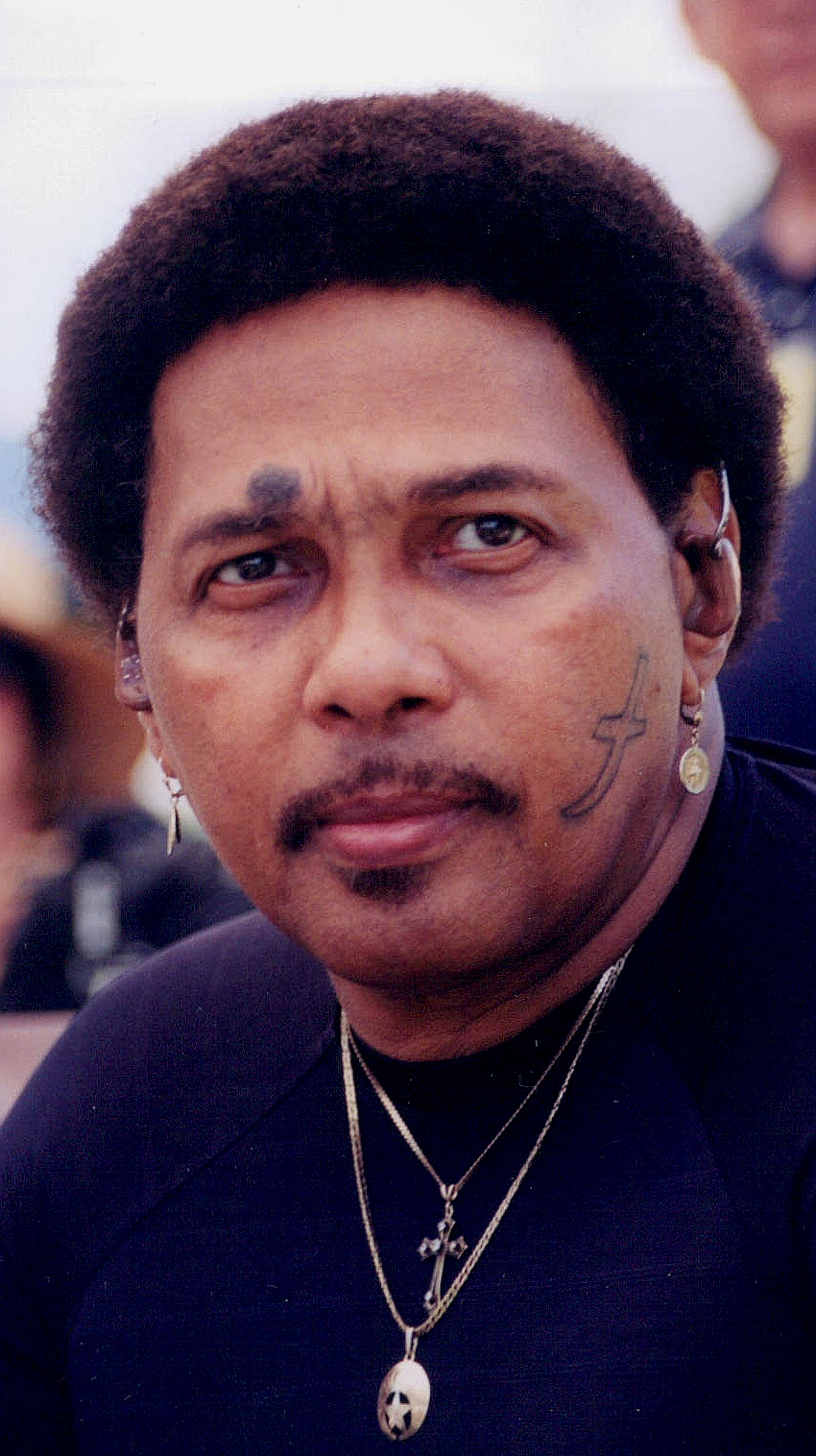
Aaron Neville

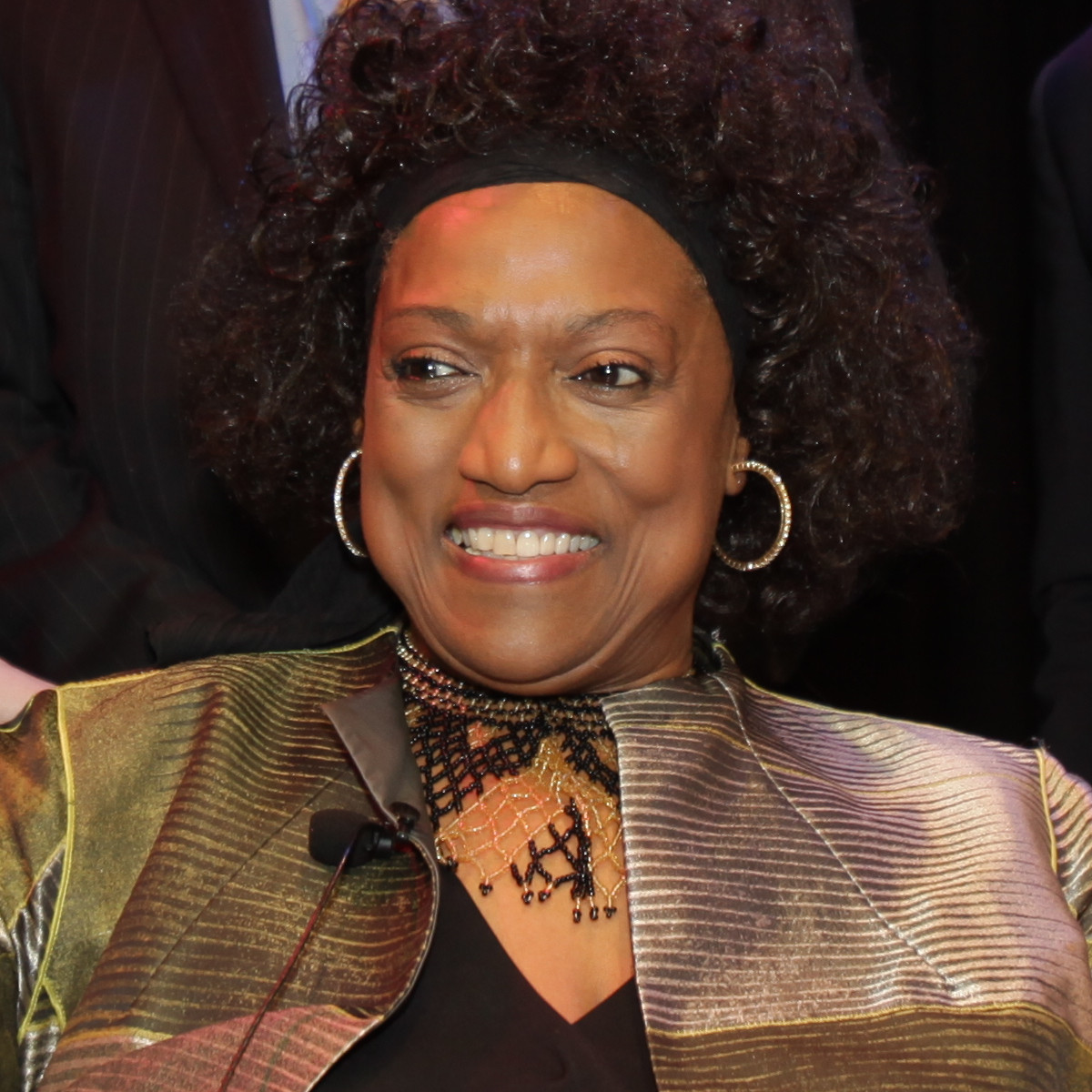
Jessye Norman

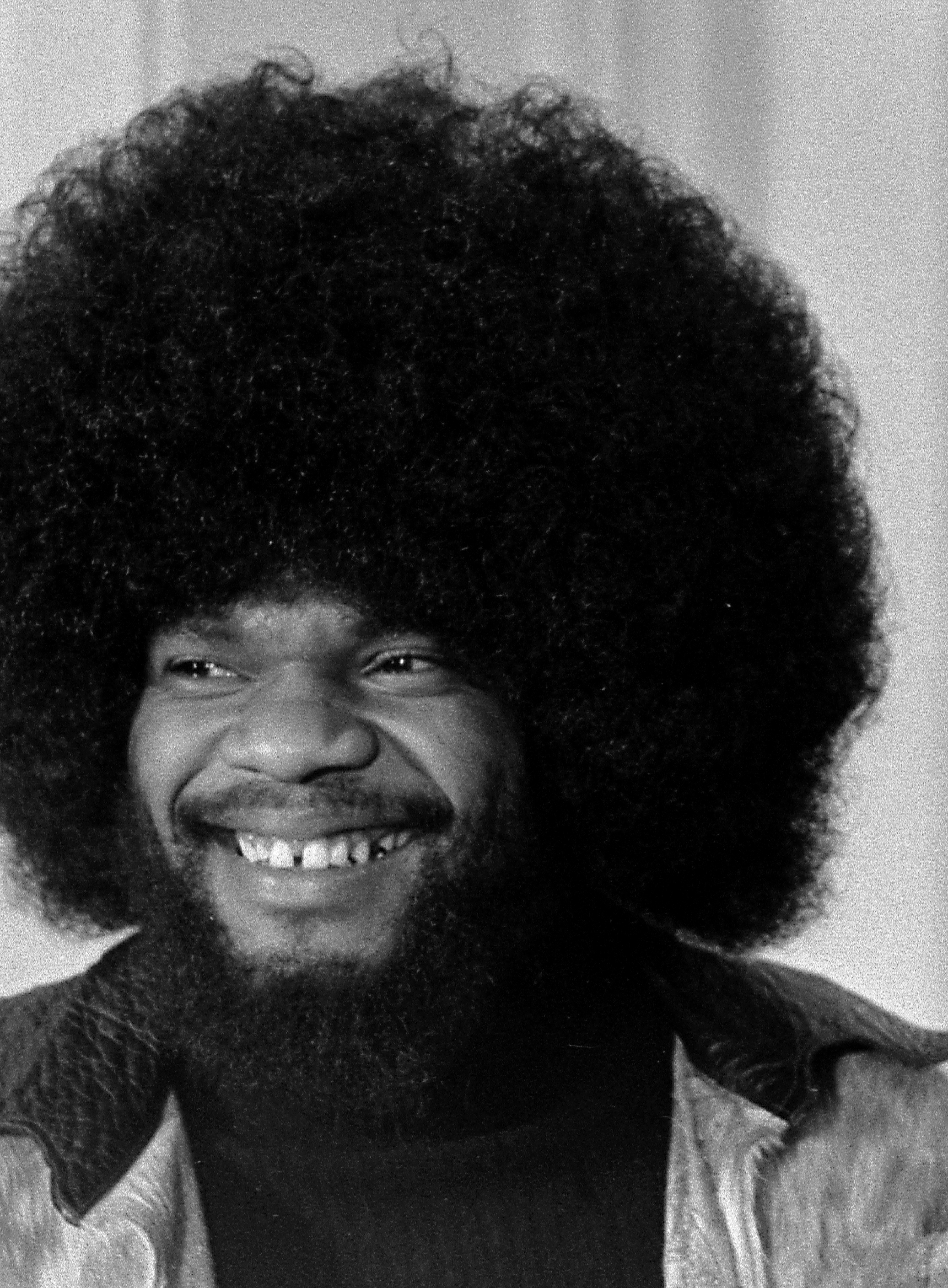
Billy Preston

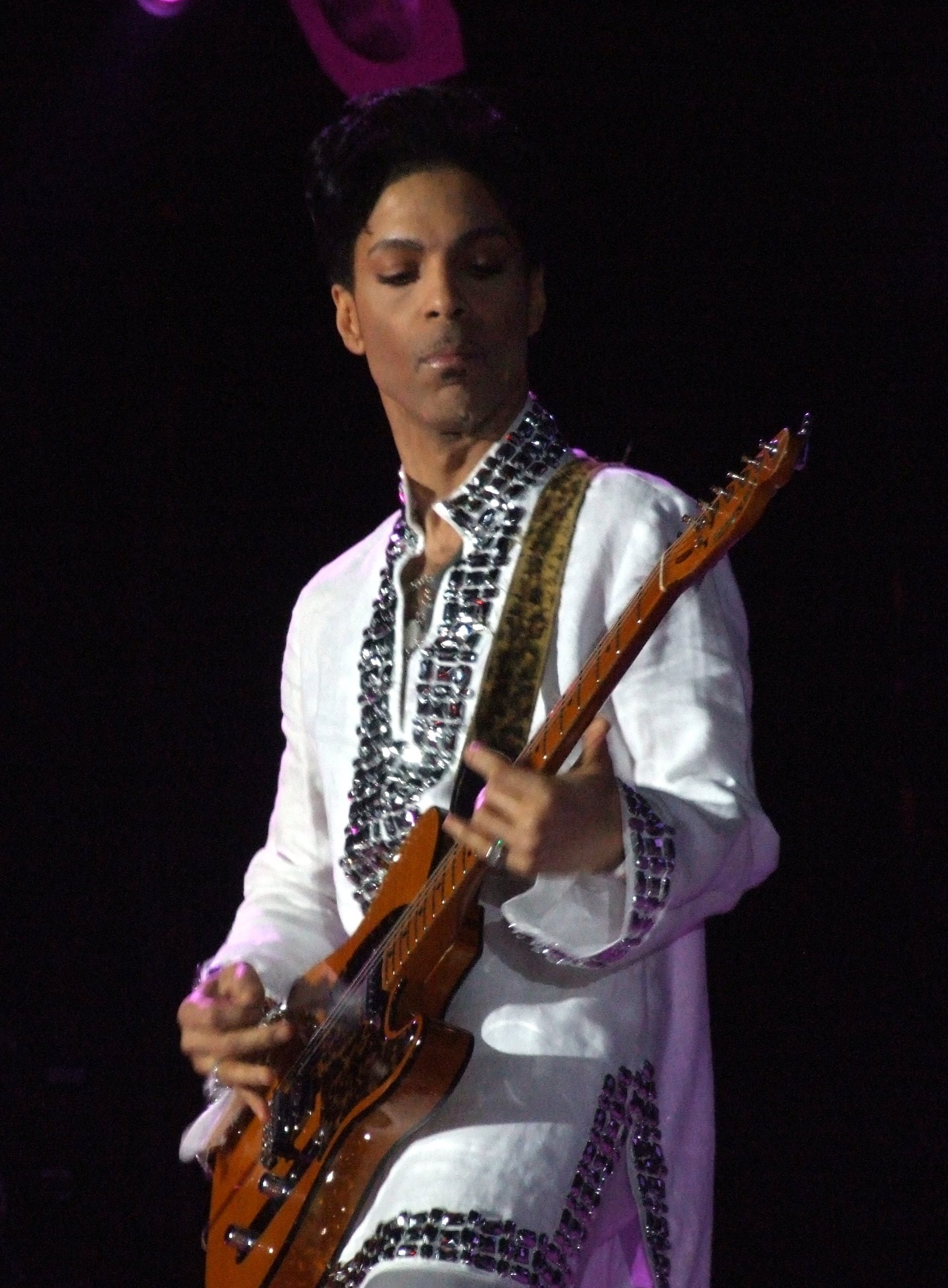
Prince

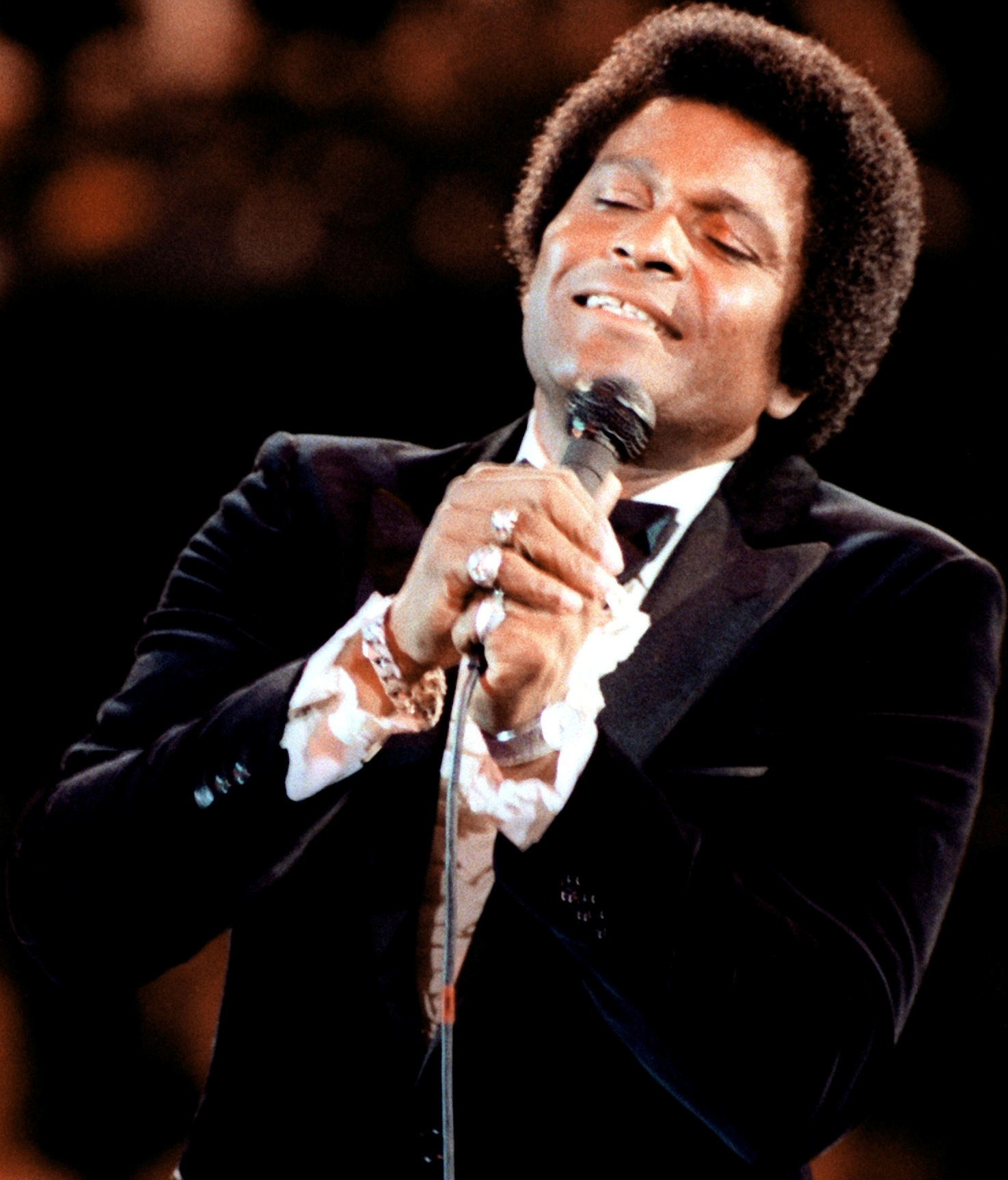
Charley Pride

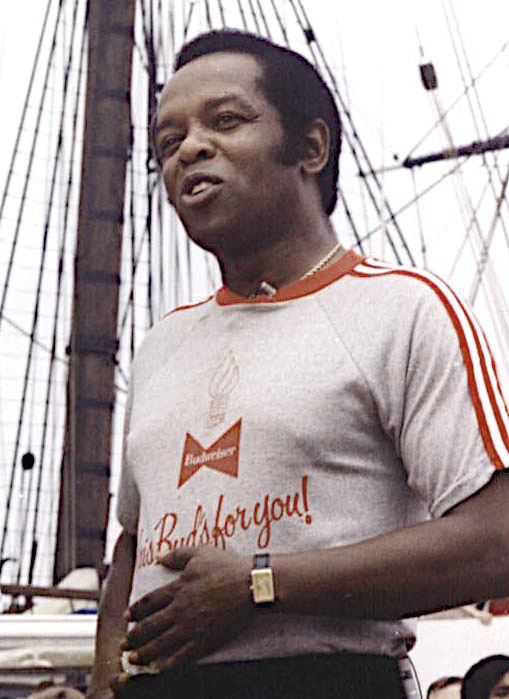
Lou Rawls

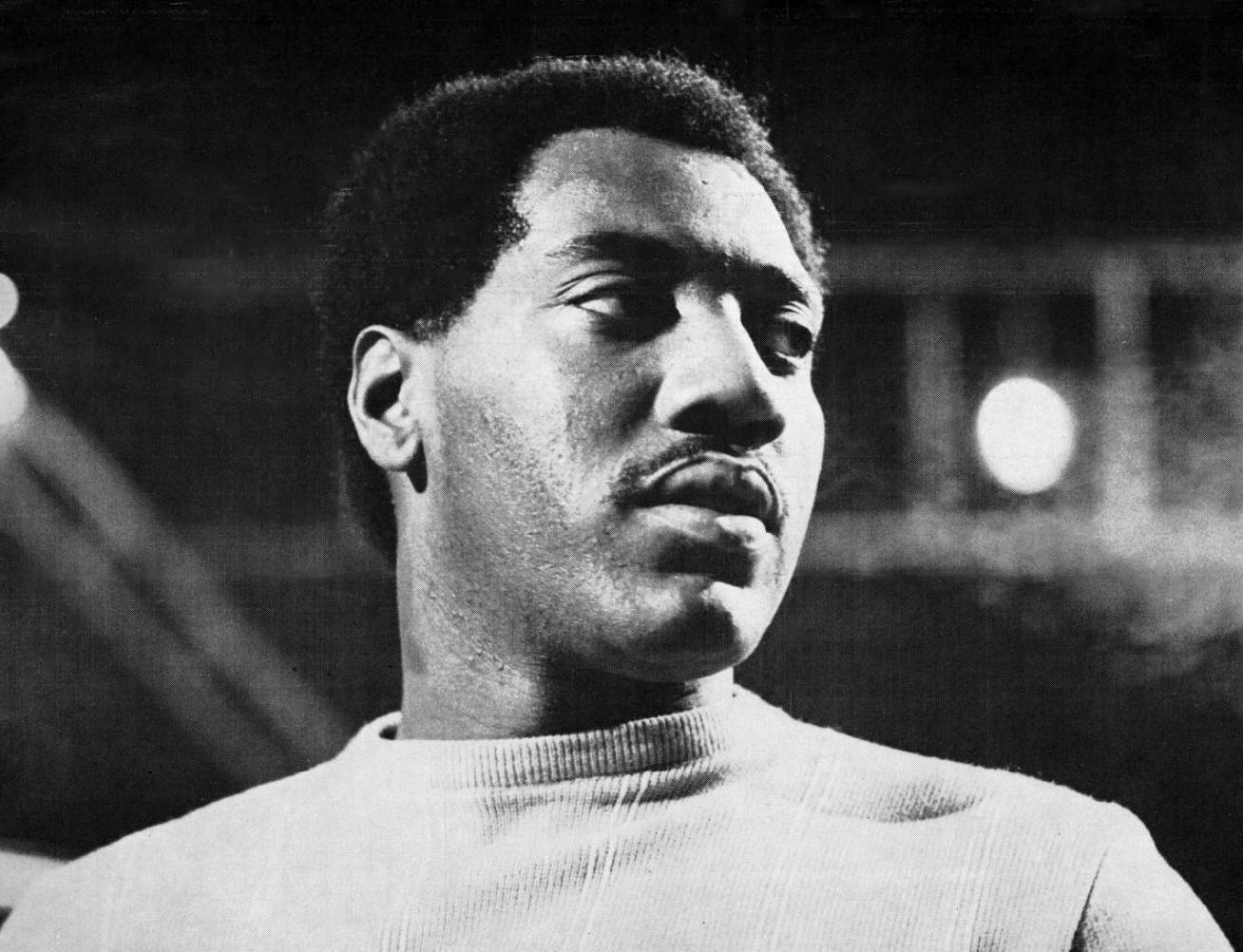
Otis Redding

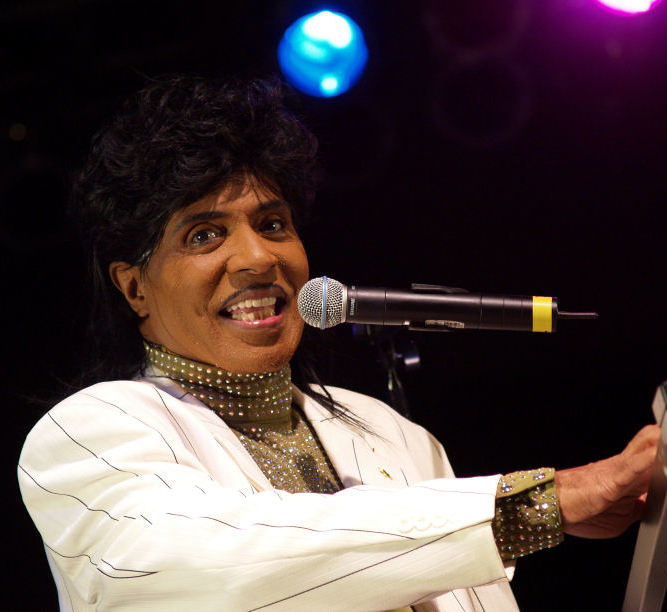
Little Richard

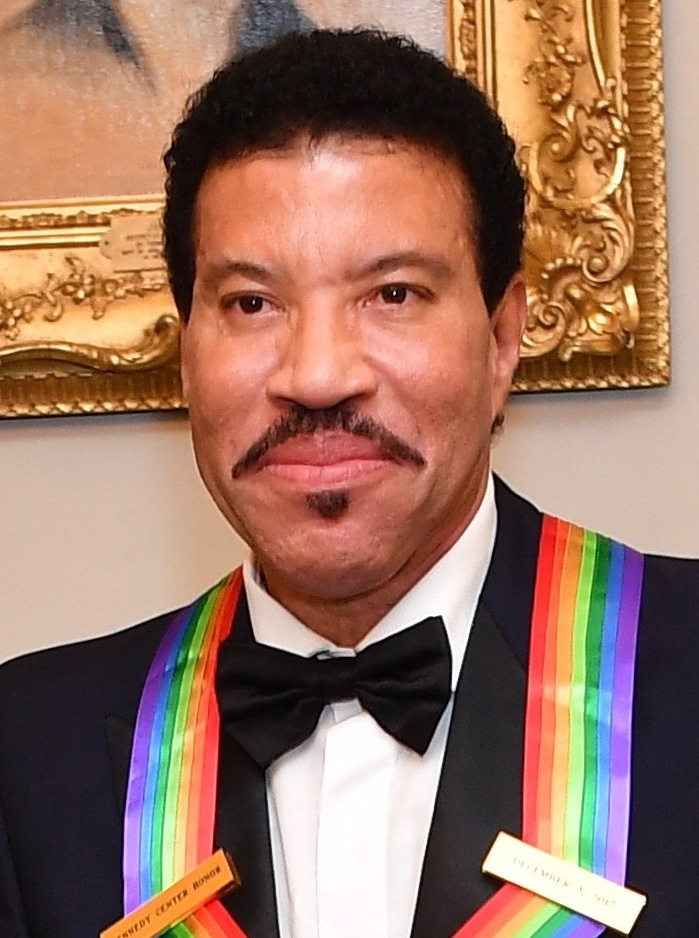
Lionel Richie

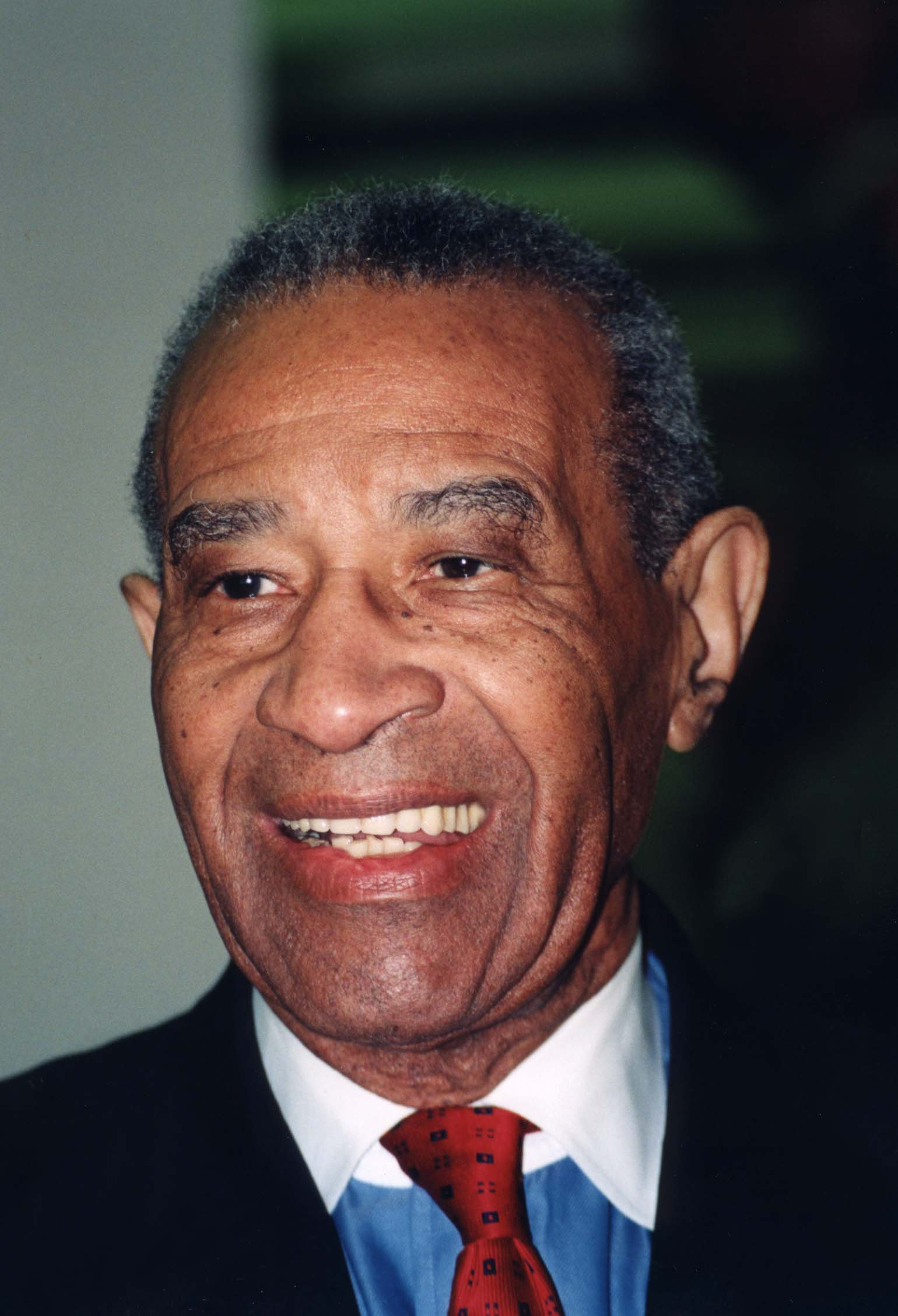
Max Roach

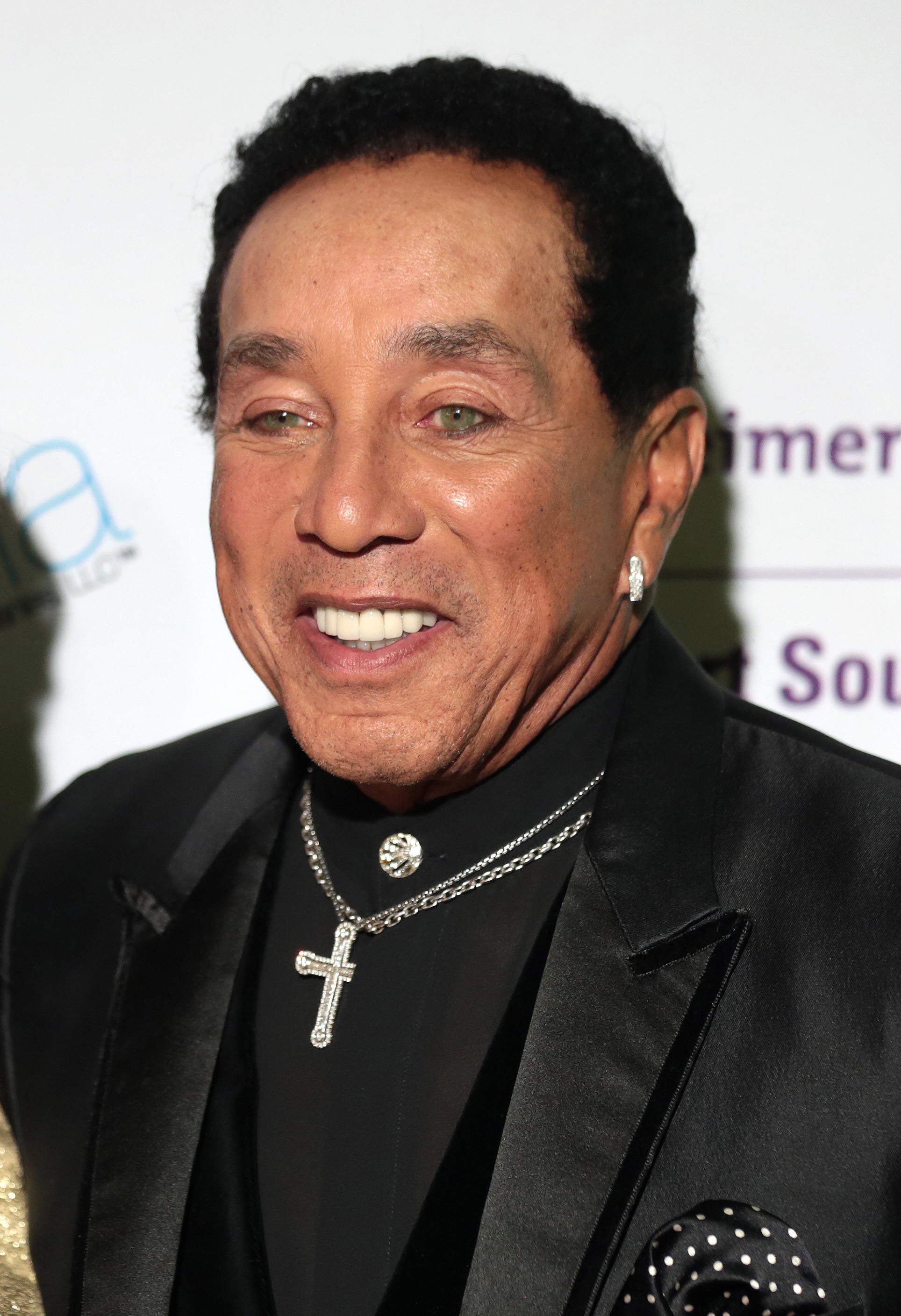
Smokey Robinson

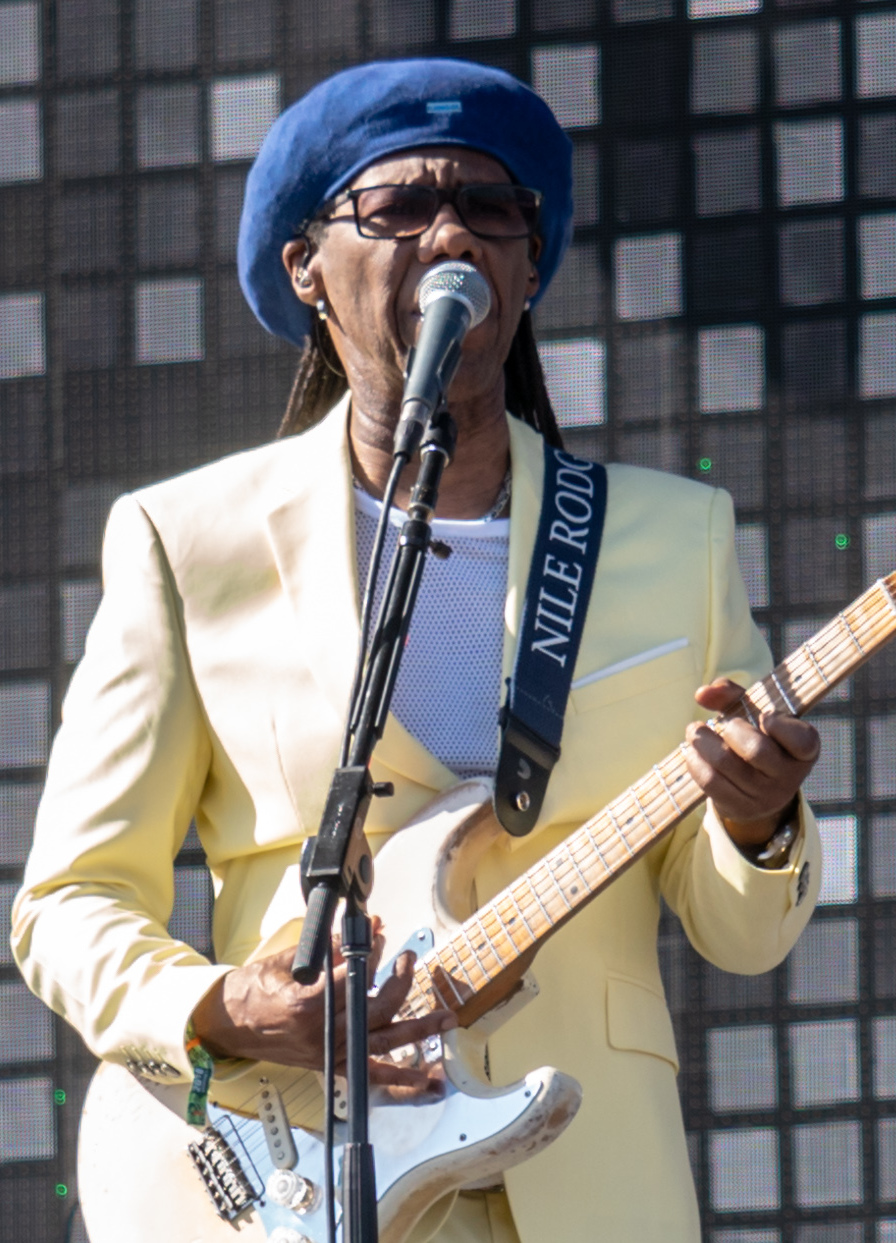
Nile Rodgers

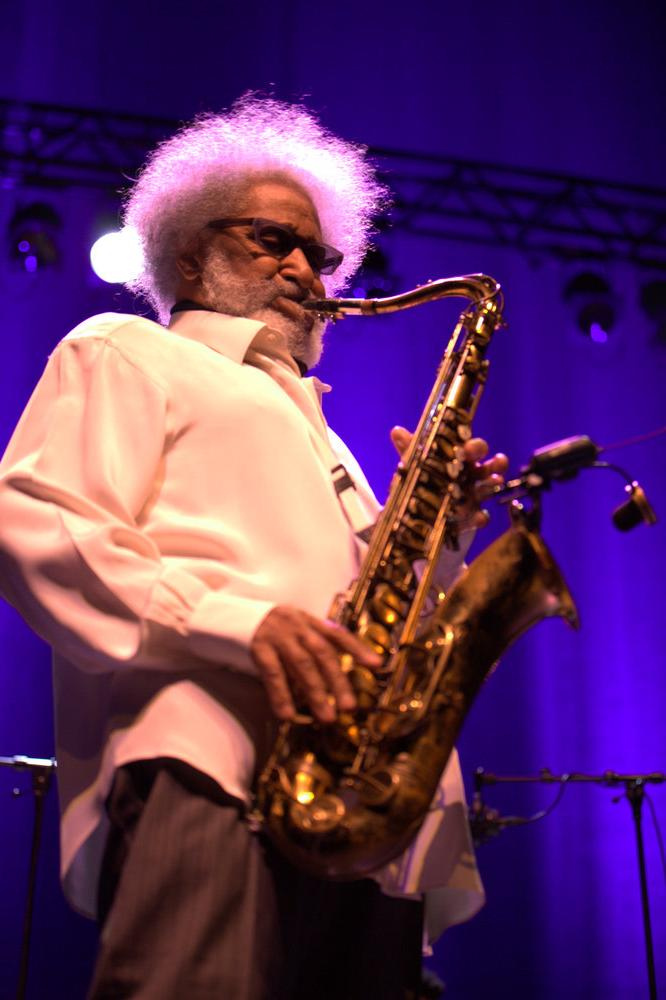
Sonny Rollins

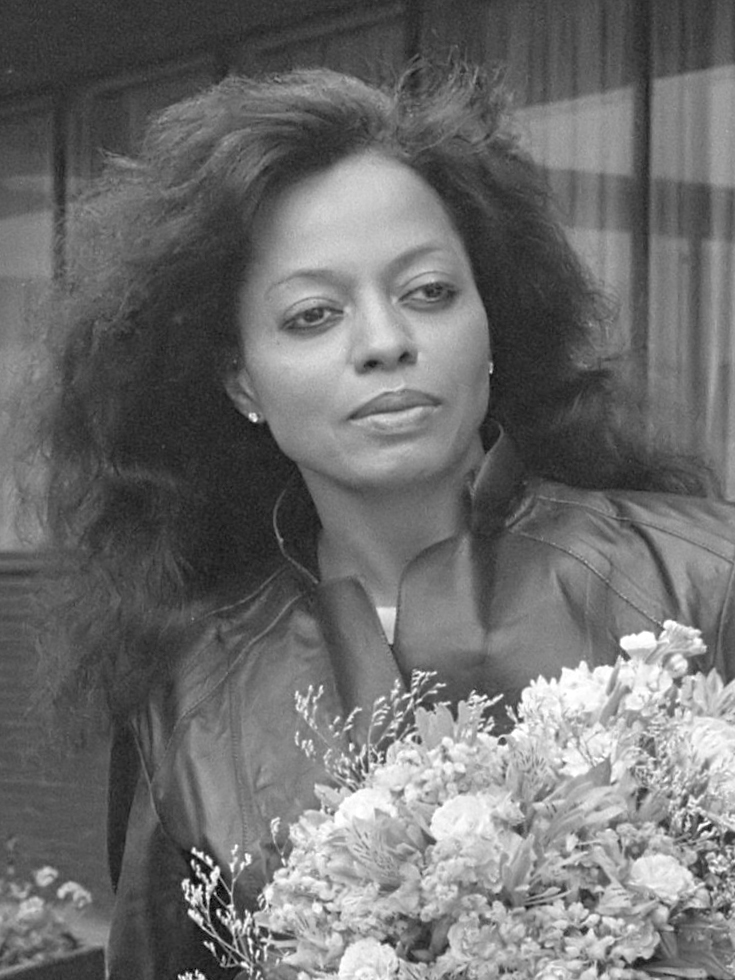
Diana Ross

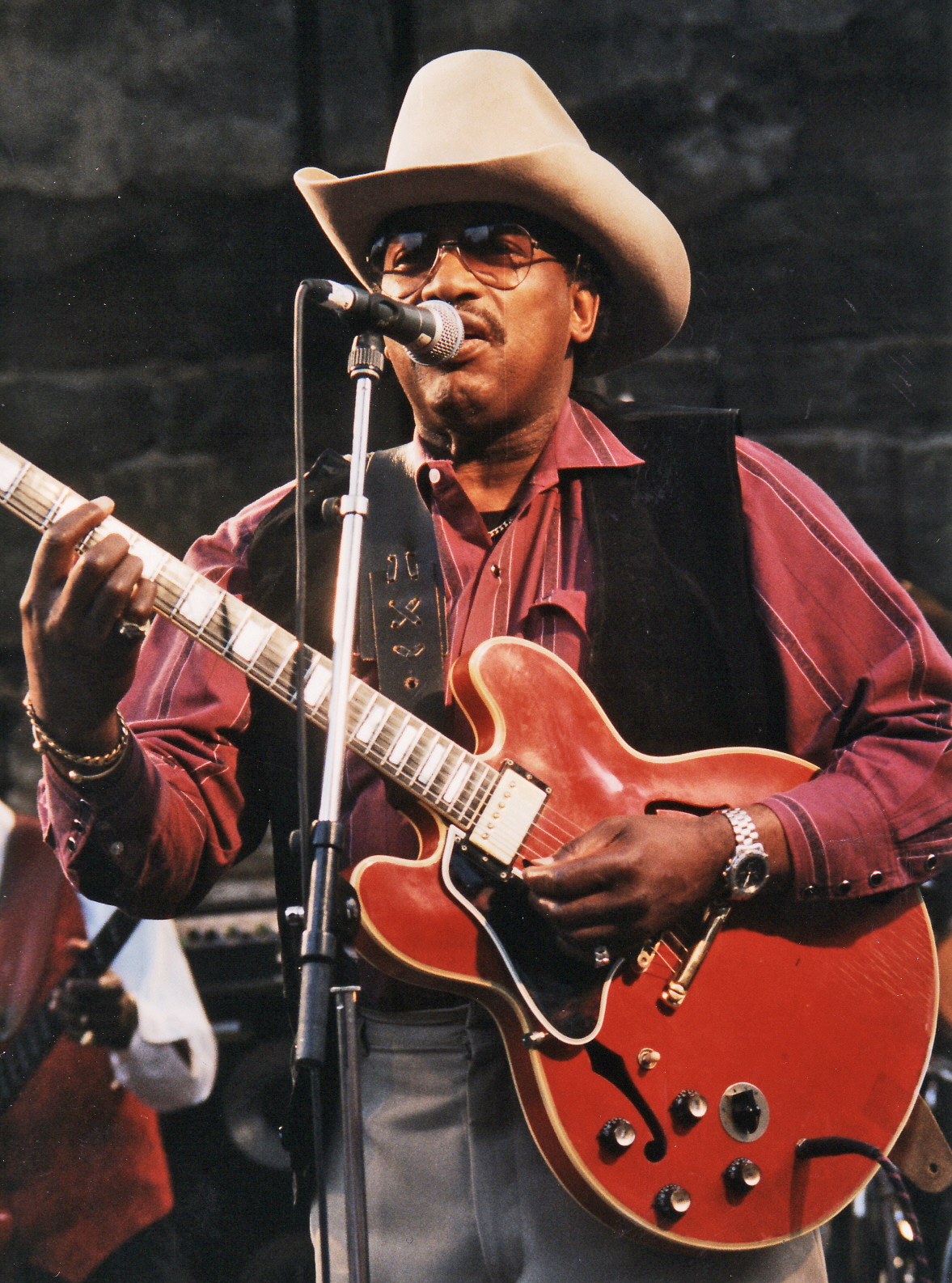
Otis Rush

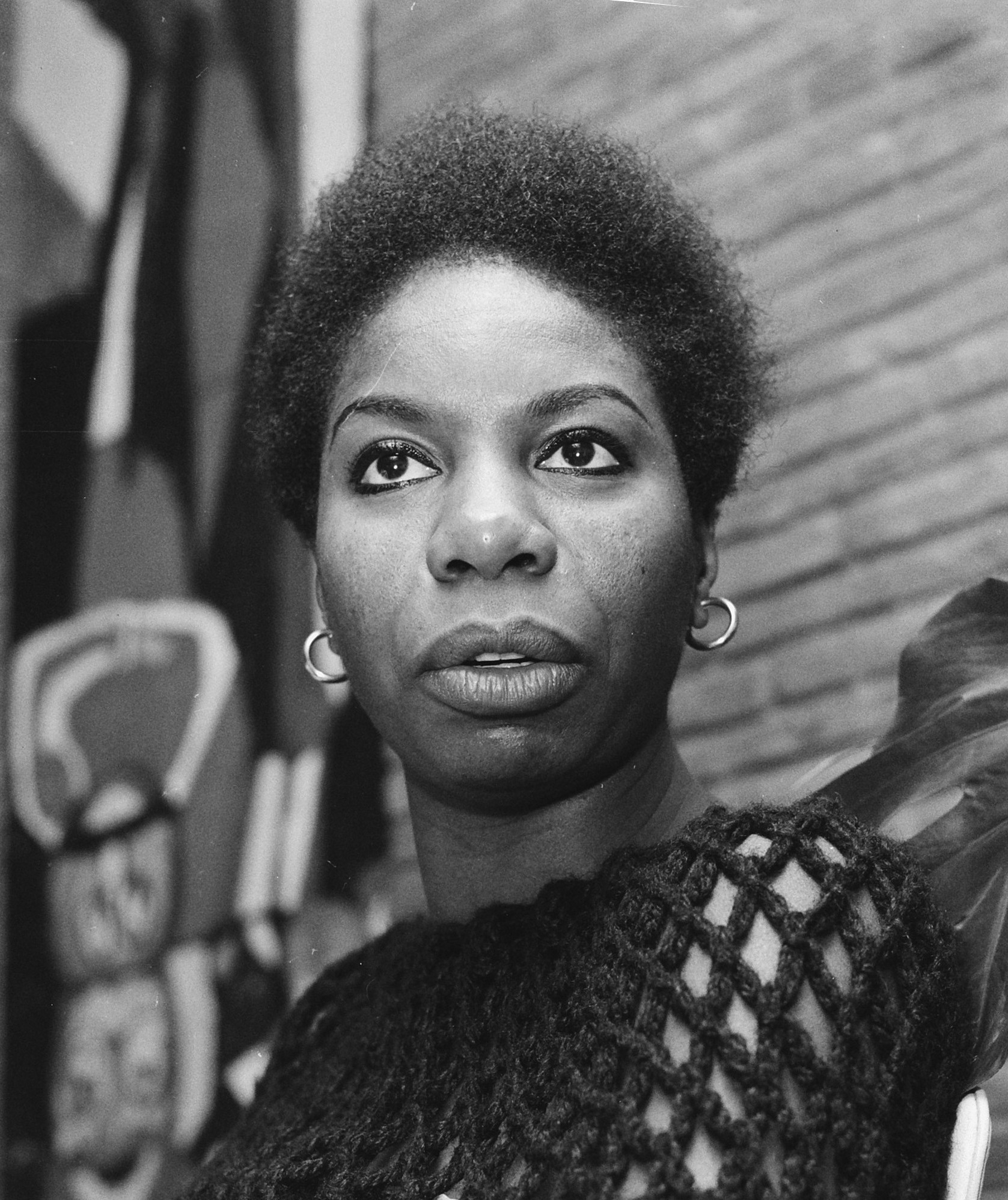
Nina Simone

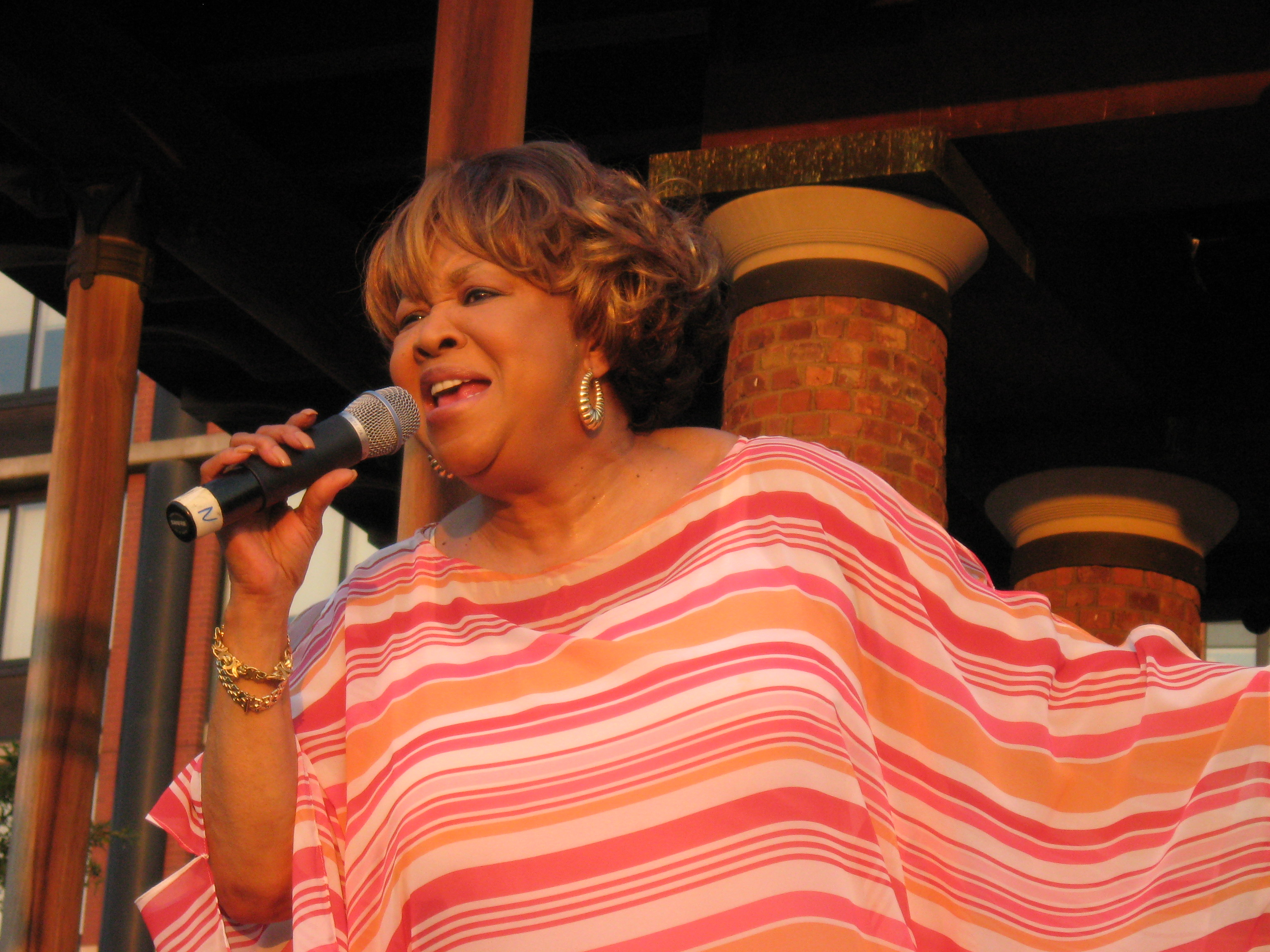
Mavis Staples

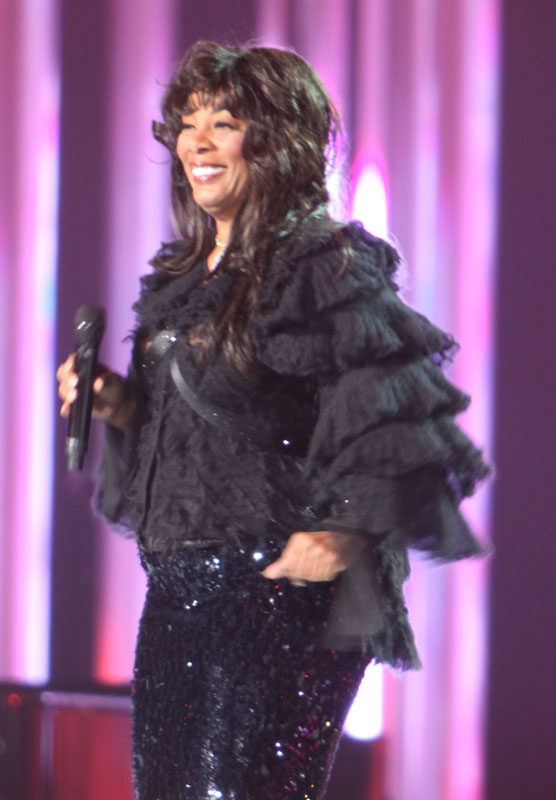
Donna Summer

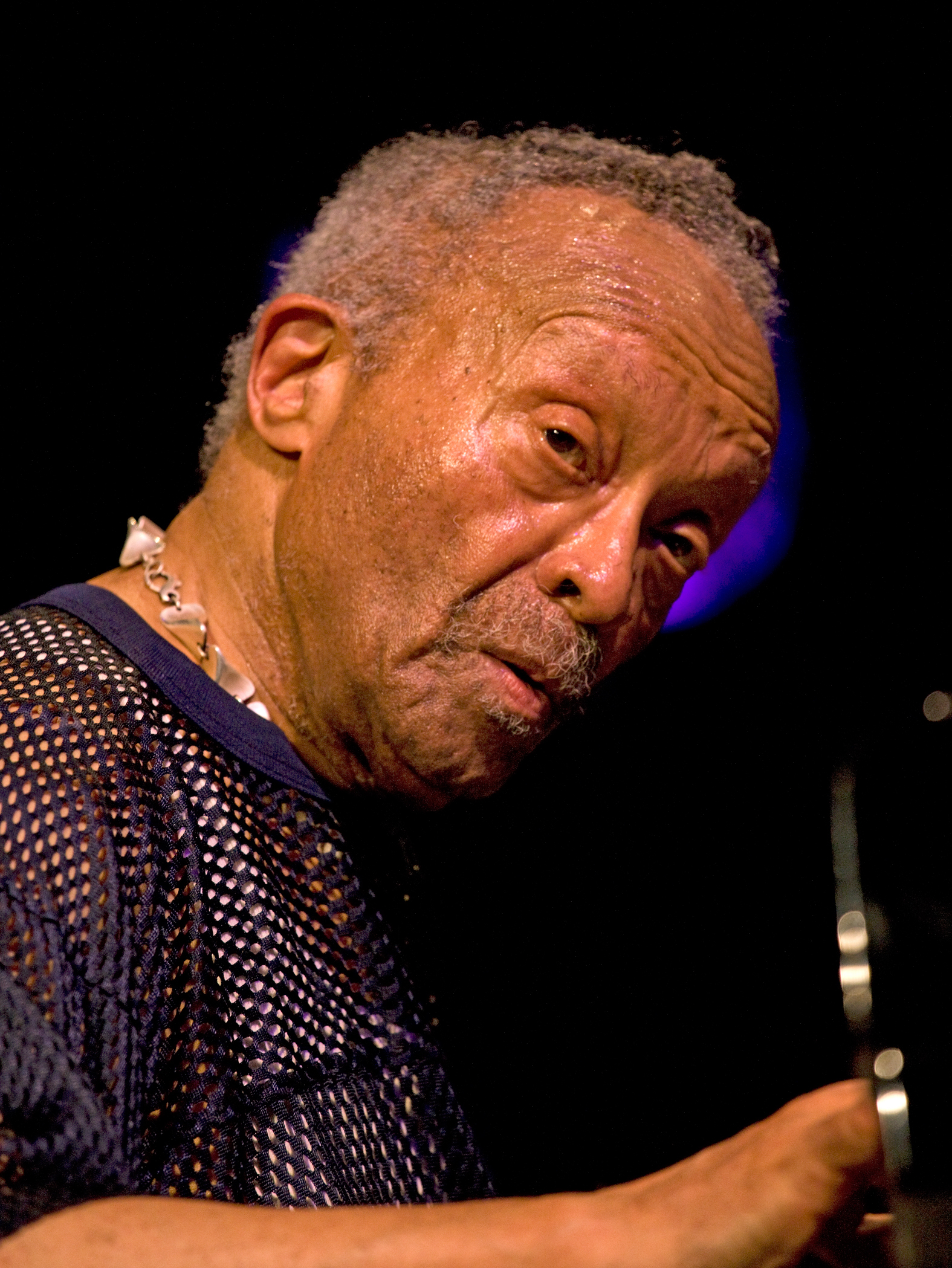
Cecil Taylor

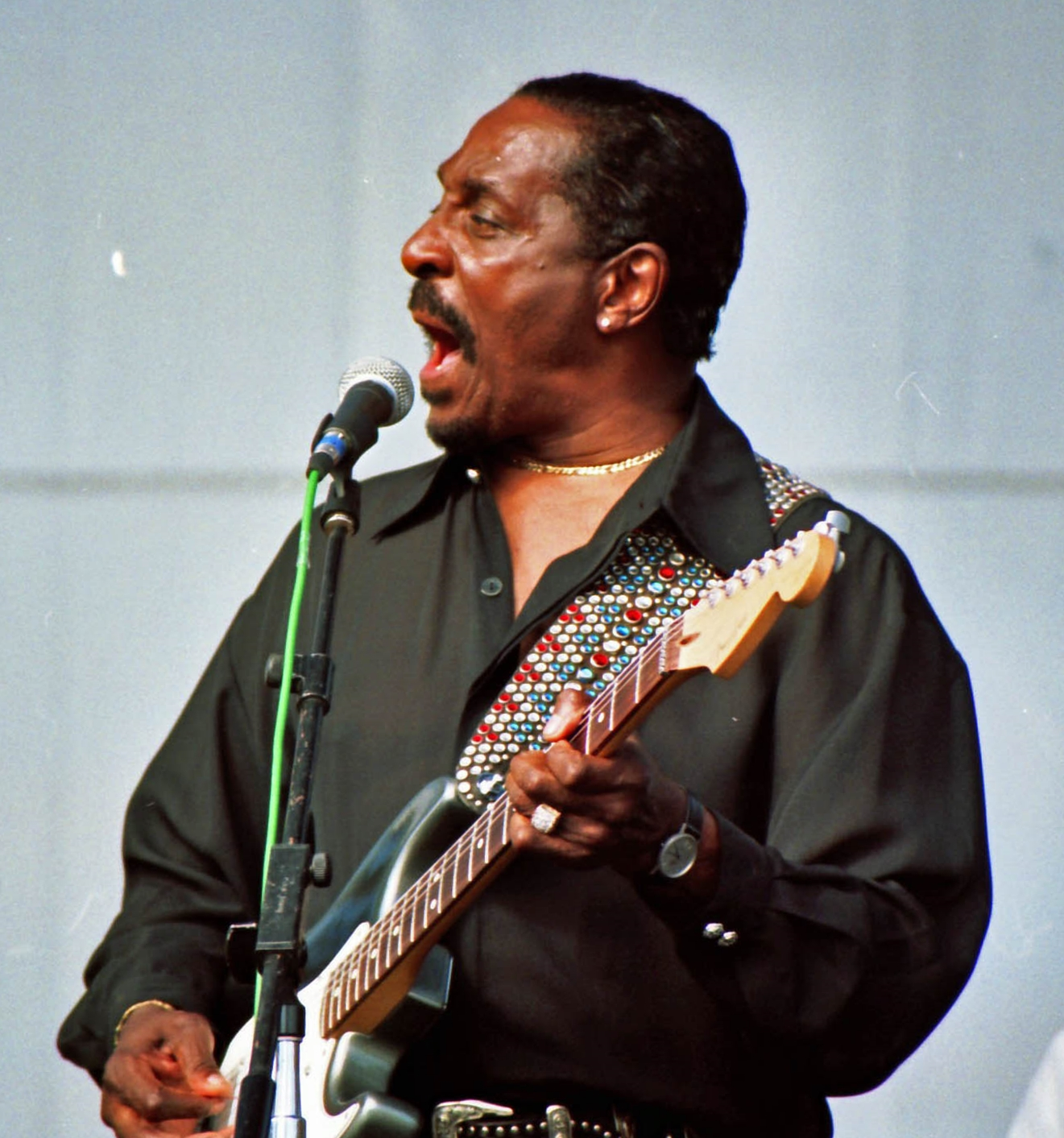
Ike Turner

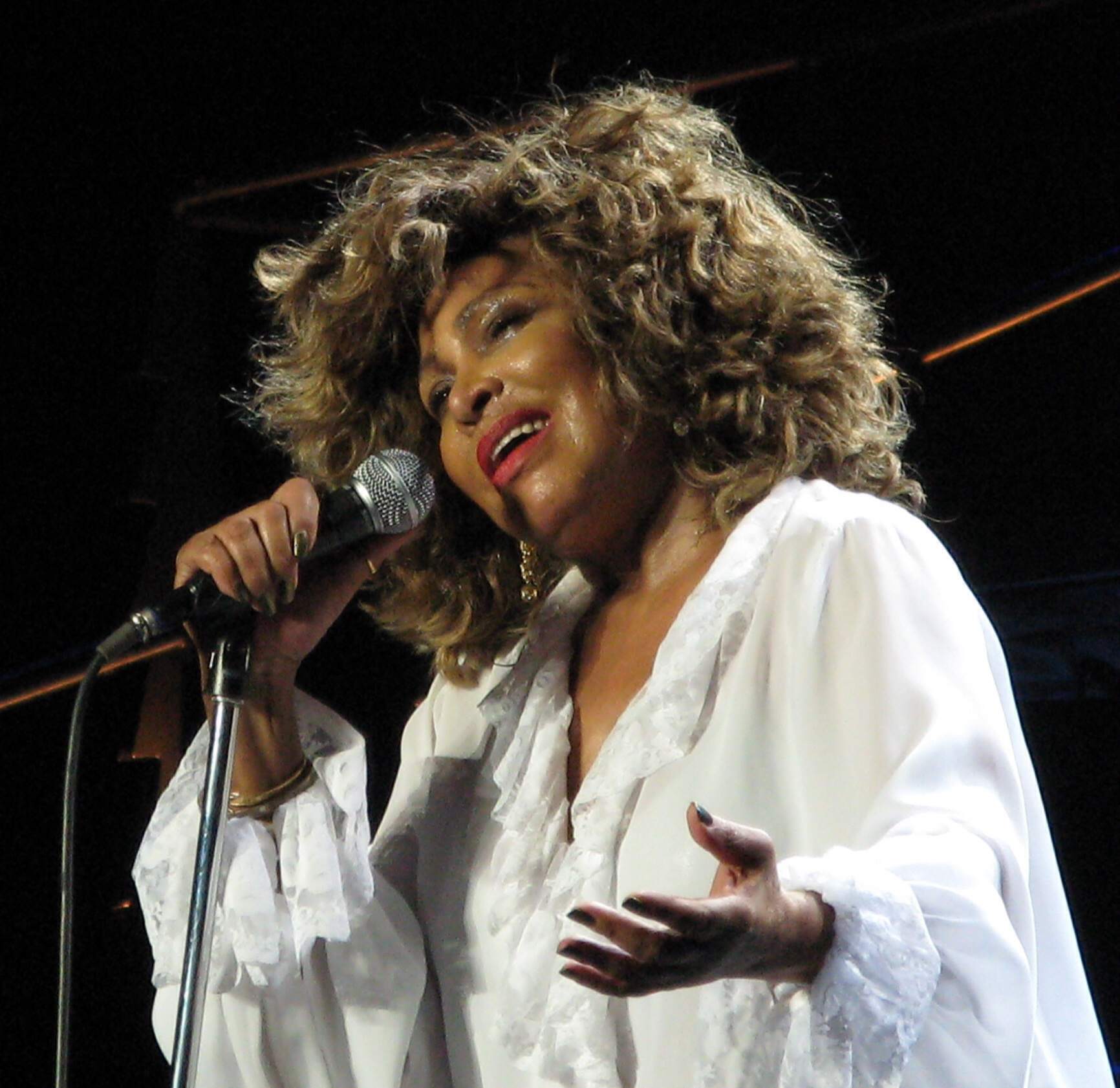
Tina Turner

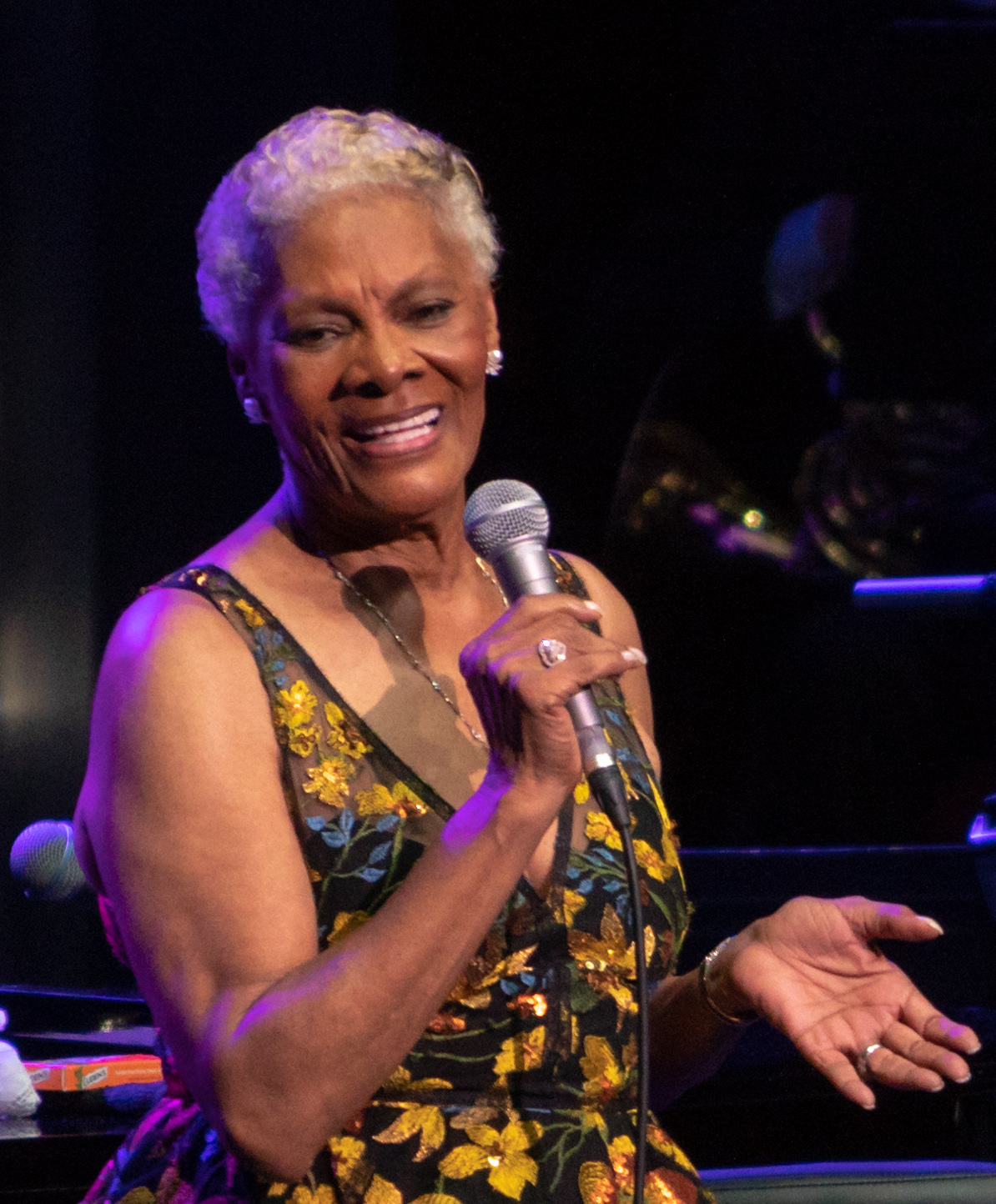
Dionne Warwick

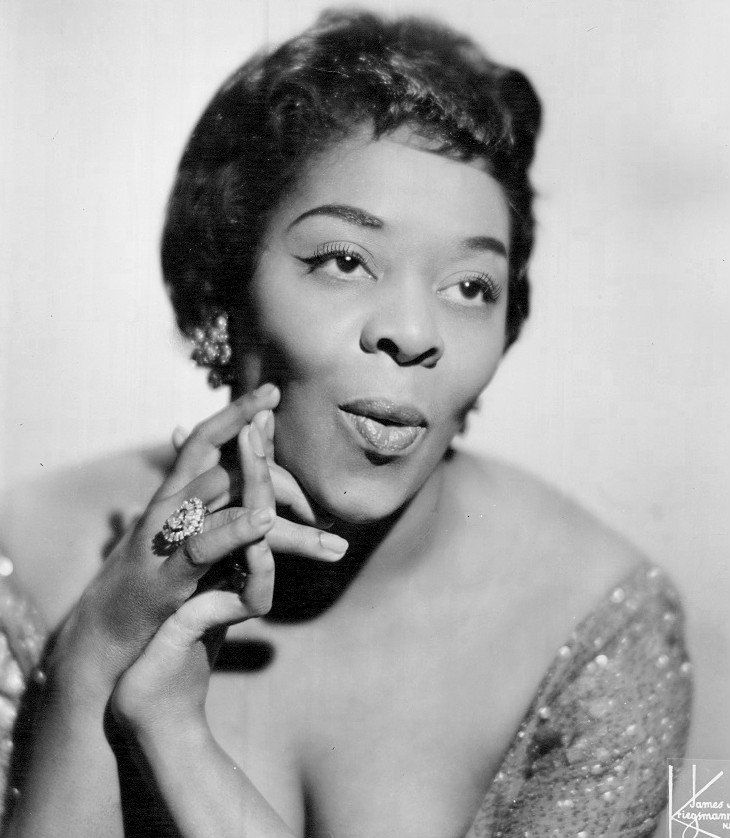
Dinah Washington

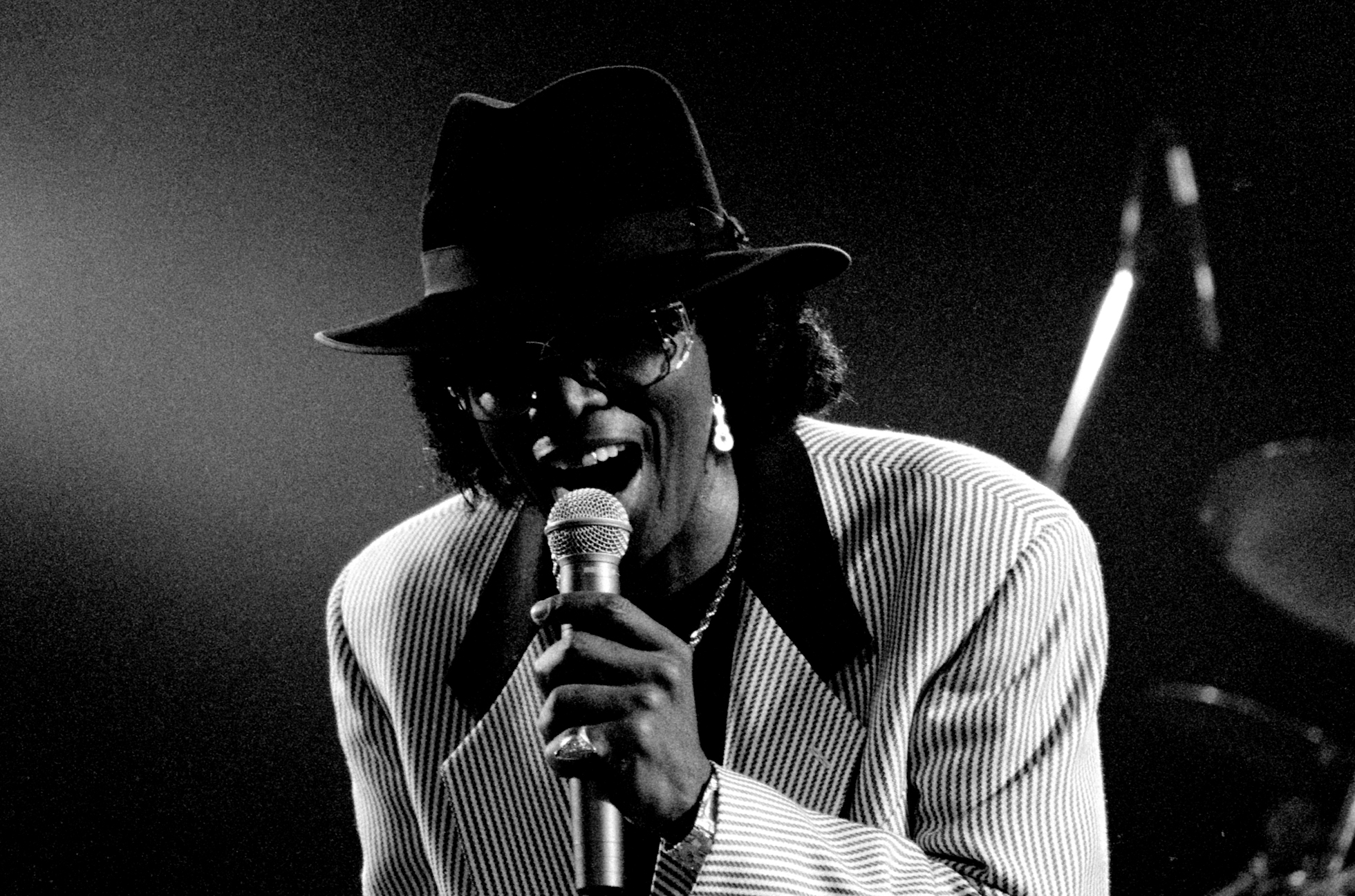
Johnny "Guitar" Watson

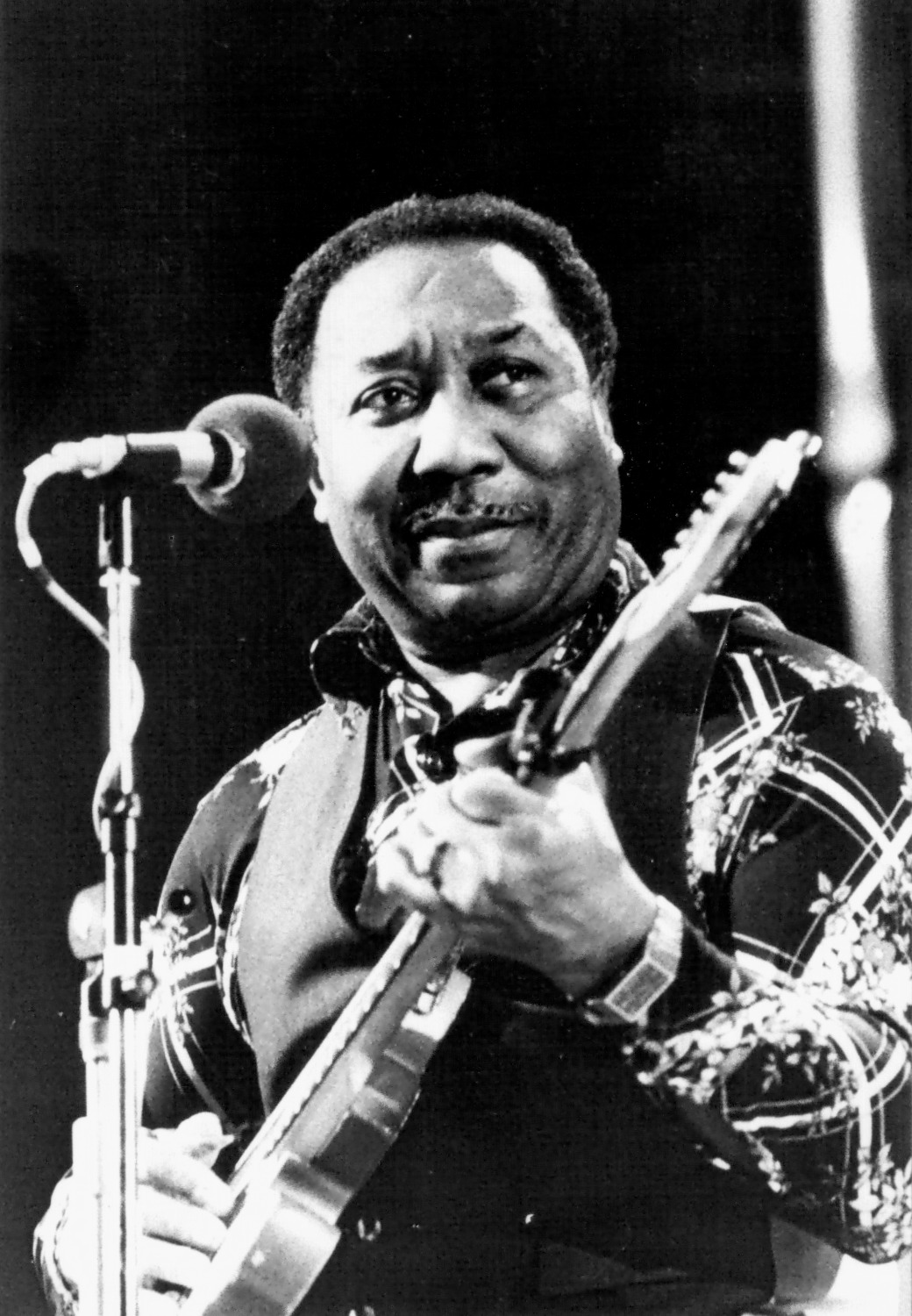
Muddy Waters

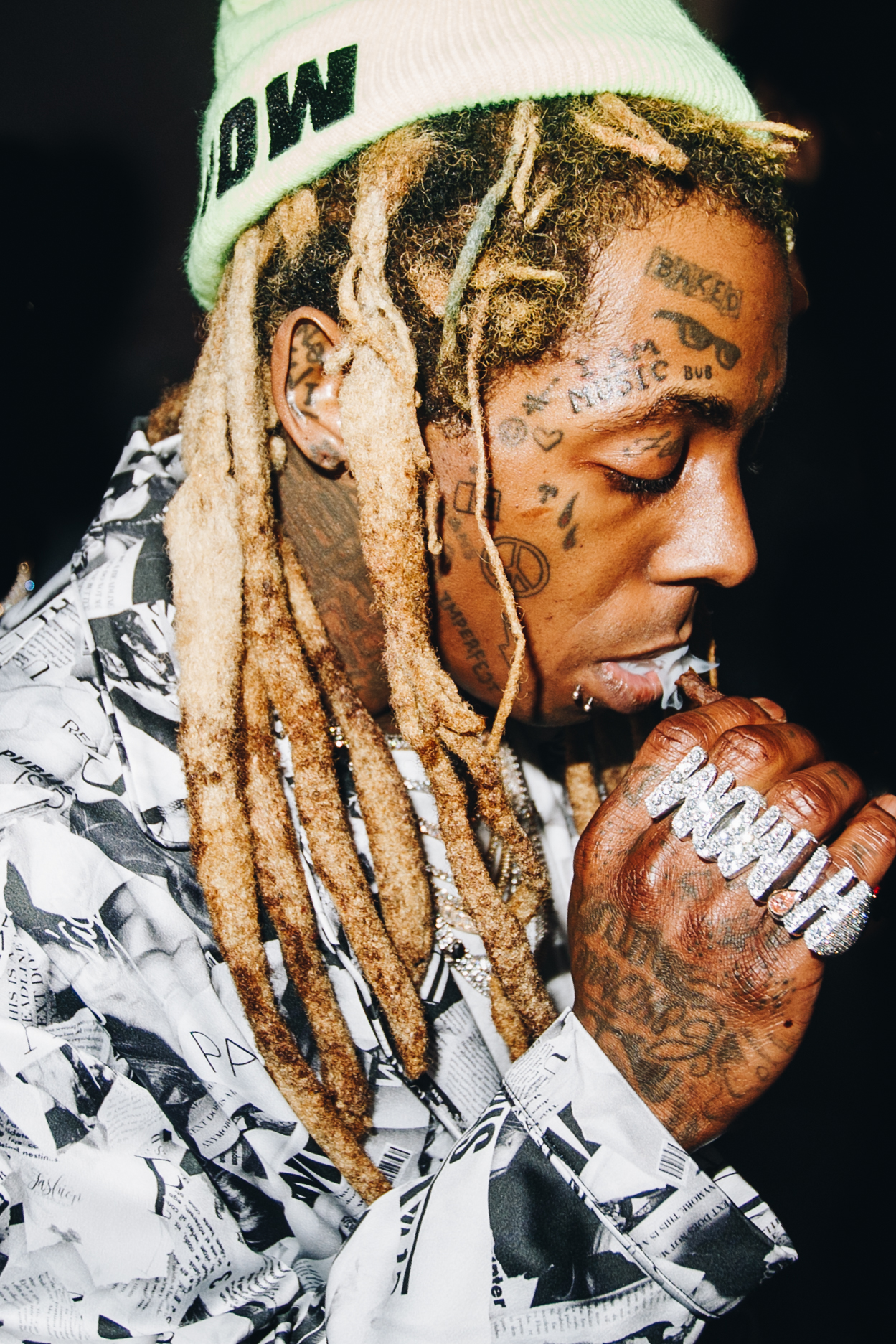
Lil Wayne

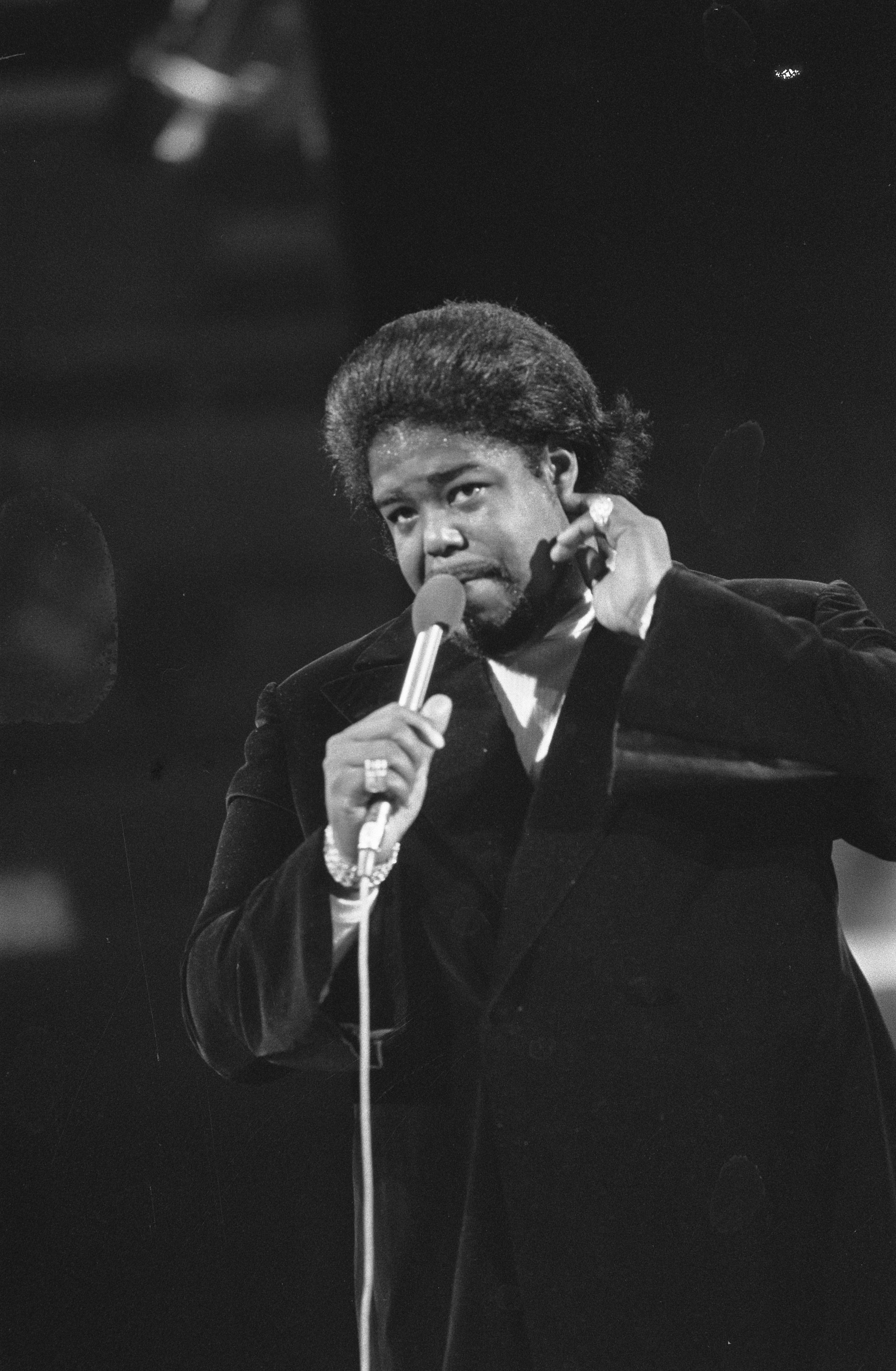
Barry White

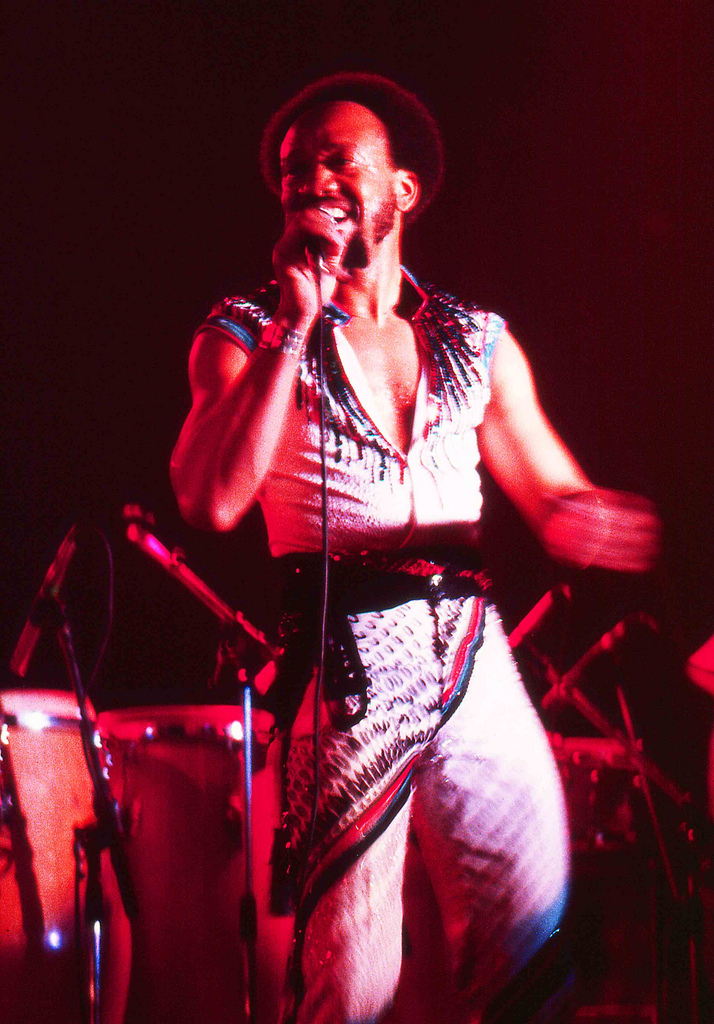
Maurice White

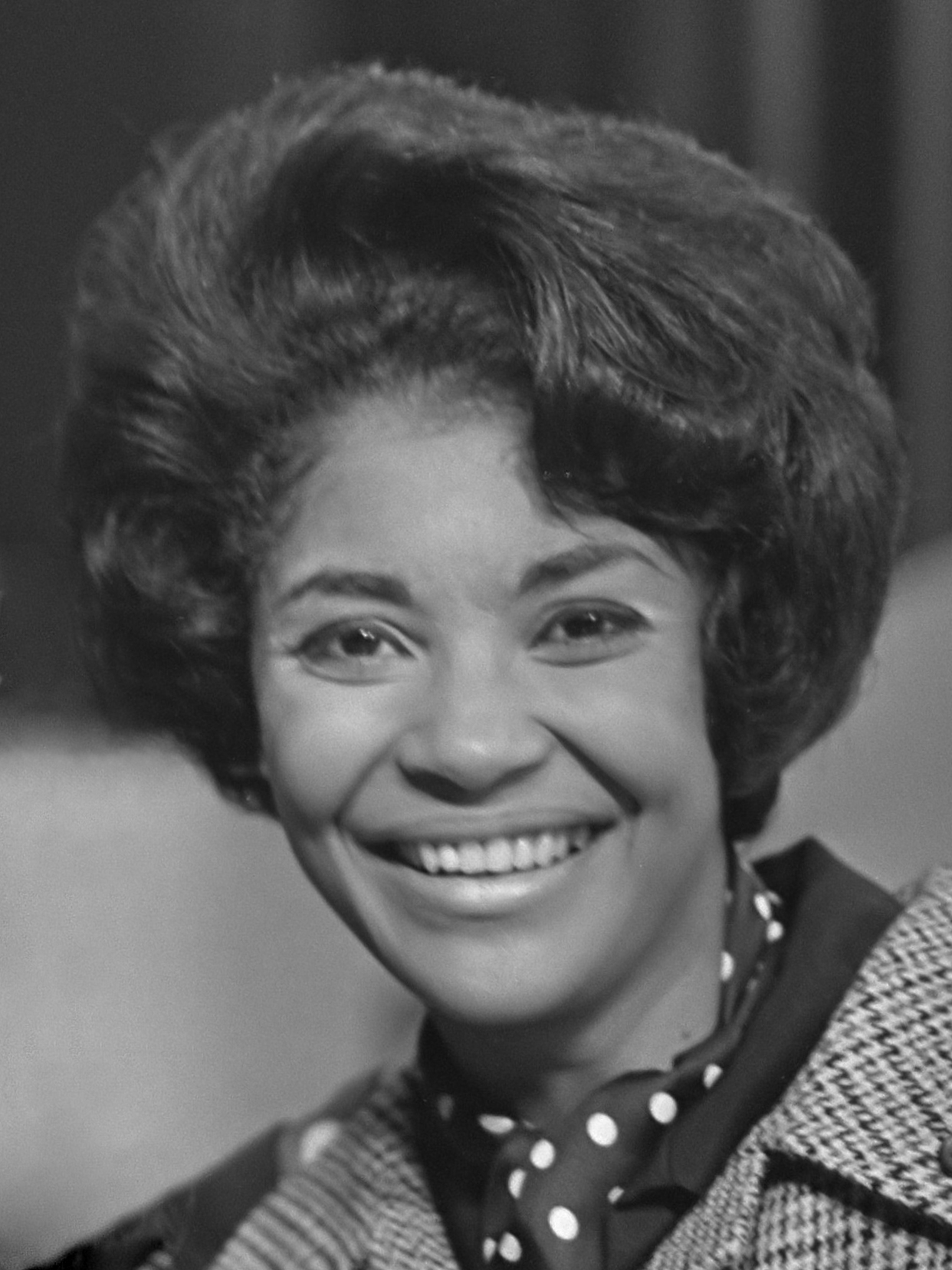
Nancy Wilson

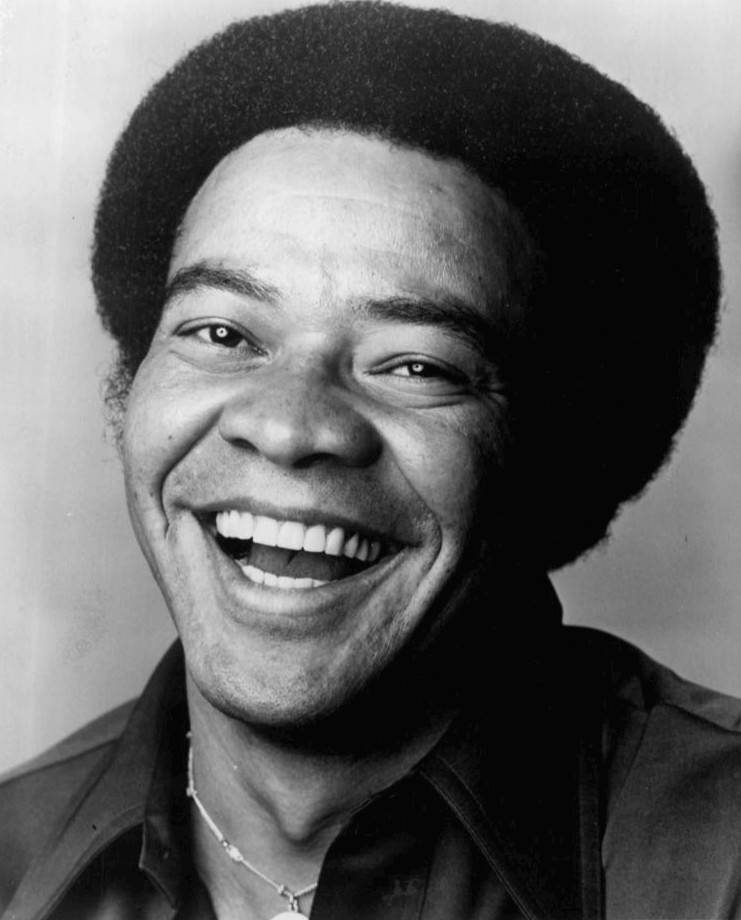
Bill Withers

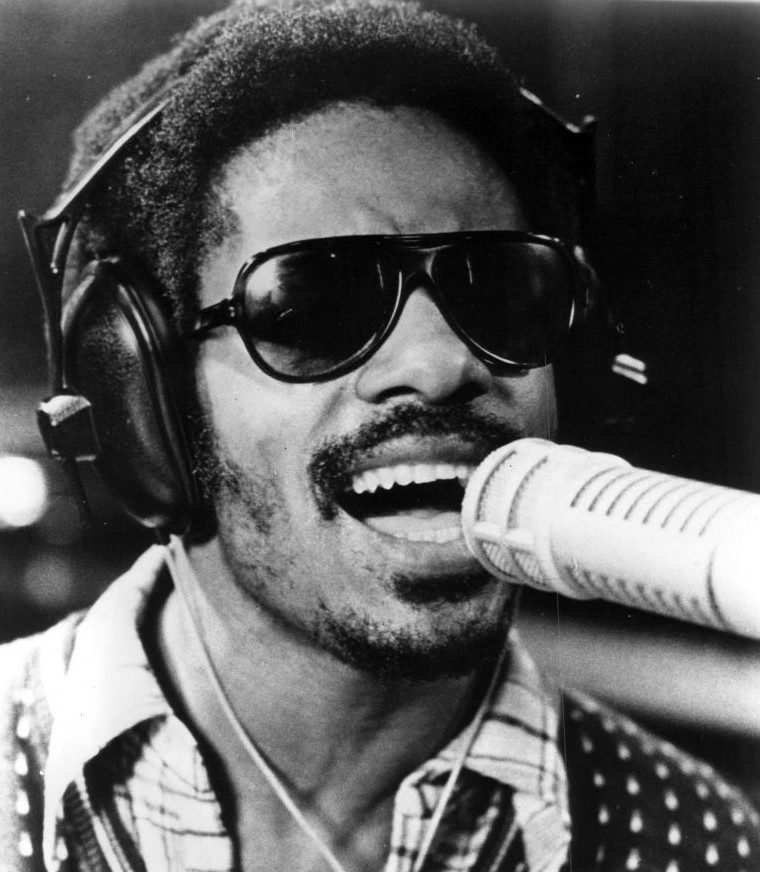
Stevie Wonder

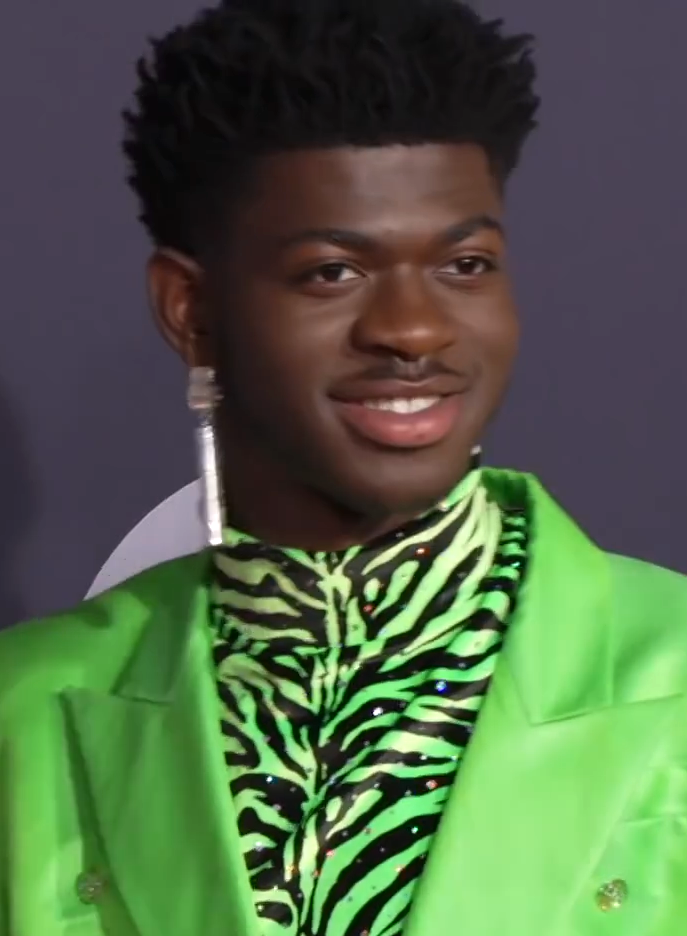
Lil Nas X

=== 0–9 ===
- 2 Chainz (born 1977): hip-hop, dirty South/Southern hip-hop
- 4Batz (born 2003): R&B, hip-hop
- 50 Cent (born 1975): hip-hop

=== A ===
- Aaliyah (1979–2001): R&B, pop
- Johnny Ace (1929–1954): R&B
- Alicia Keys (born 1981): pop
- Gregory Abbott (born 1954): soul, R&B, his father was born in Venezuela
- Armenta Adams (born 1936): Classical pianist
- Arthur Adams (born 1943): blues, R&B
- Johnny Adams (1936–1998): gospel, R&B, soul, jazz
- Yolanda Adams (born 1961): gospel
- Nat Adderley (1931–2000): jazz
- Cannonball Adderley (1928–1975): Jazz
- Afroman (born 1974): hip-hop
- Akon (born 1973): R&B, pop, hip-hop, dancehall
- Sasha Allen (born 1982): R&B, rock, soul
- Luther Allison (1939–1997): blues
- Amil (born 1973): hip-hop
- Anderson .Paak (born 1986): hip-hop, R&B, soul, funk, pop
- Cat Anderson (1916–1981): jazz
- Ivie Anderson (1904–1949): jazz
- Marian Anderson (1897–1993): opera
- Louis Armstrong (1901–1971): blues, jazz
- Billy Boy Arnold (born 1935): R&B
- Martina Arroyo (1936―2026): opera
- Dorothy Ashby (1932–1986): jazz
- Belcalis Marlenis Almanzar (born 1992): hip-hop
- Jhené Aiko (born 1988): R&B, neo soul
- Ashanti (born 1980): R&B, hip-hop, soul
- Amerie (born 1980): R&B, pop, hip-hop, soul, funk, go-go
- Patti Austin (born 1950): R&B, pop, jazz
- Roy Ayers (1940–2025): jazz, funk, disco, R&B, hip-hop
- Ayo & Teo: (African-American father) hip-hop, dance, trap

=== B ===
- Lil Baby (born 1994): hip-hop
- Babyface (born 1959): R&B
- Erykah Badu (born 1971): neo soul, R&B, funk, hip-hop
- Chloe Bailey (born 1998): R&B
- Halle Bailey (born 2000): R&B
- Mildred Bailey (1907–1951): jazz
- Pearl Bailey (1918–1990): vaudeville
- Anita Baker (born 1958), R&B, soul
- Josephine Baker (1906–1975): Pop, jazz
- LaVern Baker (1929–1997): R&B
- Florence Ballard (1943–1976): R&B, pop, soul
- Azealia Banks (born 1991): hip-hop, pop, hip house
- Lloyd Banks (born 1982): hip-hop
- Fantasia Barrino (born 1984): R&B, soul, gospel
- Dave Bartholomew (1918–2019): R&B, R&R
- Count Basie (1904–1984): jazz
- Fontella Bass (1940–2012): R&B, soul
- Kathleen Battle (born 1948): opera
- Swizz Beatz (born 1978): hip-hop (African-American and Eritrean descent)
- Sidney Bechet (1897–1959): jazz
- Carey Bell (1936–2007): blues
- Madeline Bell (born 1942): soul
- Eric Benet (born 1966): R&B, neo soul
- George Benson (born 1943): jazz, R&B, soul, funk
- Gladys Bentley (1907–1960): blues
- Brook Benton (1931–1988): pop, R&B, soul
- Denée Benton (born 1992): Broadway, pop
- Chuck Berry (1926–2017): rock
- Frankie Beverly (1946–2024): R&B, soul, funk
- Andy Bey (1939–2025): jazz
- Beyoncé (born 1981): R&B, pop
- Birdman (born 1969): rapper
- Cindy Birdsong (born 1939: R&B, soul, pop
- Terry Blade: singer-songwriter
- Mykki Blanco (born 1986): hip-hop
- Blind Blake (1896–1934): ragtime, blues
- Art Blakey (1919–1990): jazz
- Bobby Bland (1930–2013): blues
- Jules Bledsoe (1897–1943): opera, Broadway
- Mary J. Blige (born 1971): R&B, soul, hip-hop soul
- B.o.B (born 1988): hip-hop
- Lucille Bogan (1887–1948): blues
- Buddy Bolden (1877–1931): jazz, blues
- Metro Boomin (born 1993): hip-hop
- Boosie Badazz (born 1982): Southern hip-hop
- Bow Wow (born 1987): hip-hop
- Rich Boy (born 1983): hip-hop
- Soulja Boy (born 1990): hip-hop
- Bobby Bradford (born 1934): jazz
- Charles Bradley (1948–2017): funk, soul, R&B
- Brandy (born 1979): R&B
- Tamar Braxton (born 1977): R&B, soul, pop, gospel
- Toni Braxton (born 1967): R&B, soul, pop, dance-pop, hip-hop
- Traci Braxton (1971–2022): R&B, soul, pop
- Trina Braxton (born 1974): R&B, soul, pop
- Breland (born 1995): country trap
- Dee Dee Bridgewater (born 1950): jazz
- Anthony Brown (born 1981): gospel
- Bobby Brown (born 1969): R&B, soul, pop
- Charles Brown (1922–1999): blues, R&B, rock, soul, jazz
- Chris Brown (born 1989): R&B, hip-hop, soul, pop
- Chuck Brown (1936–2012): funk, hip-hop, blues
- Clifford Brown (1930–1956): jazz
- James Brown (1933–2006): soul, funk
- Oscar Brown Jr (1926–2005): jazz
- Ruth Brown (1928–2006): R&B
- Shirley Brown (born 1947): R&B, soul
- Elbridge "Al" Bryant: R&B, pop, soul
- Joyce Bryant (1927–2022), singer known as the black Marilyn Monroe
- Peabo Bryson (1951–2026): soul, R&B
- Young Buck (born 1981): hip-hop
- Joe Budden (born 1980): hip-hop
- Grace Bumbry (1937–2023): opera
- Solomon Burke (1940–2010): blues, gospel, R&B, soul, rock and roll
- Kim Burrell (born 1972): gospel
- Kandi Burruss (born 1976): R&B, pop, hip-hop, soul
- Jerry Butler (1939–2025): soul, funk, R&B
- Donald Byrd (1932–2013): jazz, funk, soul, R&B
- J. Blackfoot (1946–2011): R&B, Soul, Jazz
- Star Bandz (born 2008): Hip hop, Trap (Mexican mother)
- Larry Blackmon (born 1956): R&B, Funk, New Jack Swing (Lead vocalist for the funk band Cameo)

=== C ===
- Ca$h Out (born 1990): hip-hop
- C-Murder (born 1971): hip-hop
- Cassidy (born 1982): hip-hop
- Erica Campbell (born 1972): gospel
- Tina Campbell (born 1974): gospel
- Cab Calloway (1907–1994): jazz
- Alyson Cambridge (born 1980): operatic soprano and classical music, jazz, pop
- Cam'ron (born 1976): hip-hop
- Canon (born 1989): Christian hip-hop
- Mariah Carey (born 1969): R&B, pop, hip-hop, soul
- Jean Carn (born 1947): jazz, pop
- Benny Carter (1907–2003): jazz
- Betty Carter (1929–1998): jazz
- Ron Carter (born 1937): jazz
- Sue Ann Carwell: funk, R&B, blues
- 50 Cent (born 1975): hip-hop
- Gene Chandler (born 1931): R&B, soul, disco
- Paul Chambers (1935–1969): jazz
- Chamillionaire (born 1979): hip-hop
- Chance the Rapper (born 1993): hip-hop
- Tracy Chapman (born 1964): folk
- Ray Charles (1930–2004): R&B, soul, blues, gospel, country, jazz, pop, rock and roll
- Chubby Checker (born 1941): rock and roll, R&B
- Cyrus Chestnut (born 1963): jazz
- Chingy (born 1980): hip-hop, rap
- Young Chop (born 1993): hip-hop, drill
- Charlie Christian (1916–1942): jazz
- Milan Christopher: rapper
- Ciara (born 1985): R&B, hip-hop, pop
- Otis Clay (1942–2016): R&B, soul, blues, gospel
- Eddy Clearwater (1935–2018): blues
- Clarence Clemons (1942–2011): rock, R&B
- James Cleveland (1931–1991): gospel, soul
- George Clinton (born 1941): funk, rock, soul
- Tasha Cobbs (born 1981): contemporary Christian music, urban contemporary gospel
- Freddy Cole (1931–2020): jazz
- J. Cole (born 1985): hip-hop (African-American father)
- Keyshia Cole (born 1981): R&B, hip-hop, hip-hop soul
- Nat King Cole (1919–1965): jazz, swing, pop
- Natalie Cole (1950–2015): R&B, pop
- Ornette Coleman (1930–2015): jazz, free funk
- Daryl Coley (1955–2016): gospel
- Mitty Collier (born 1941): R&B, soul, gospel
- Albert Collins (1932–1993): blues
- Bootsy Collins (born 1951): funk, soul, rock, R&B
- Alice Coltrane (1937–2007): jazz
- John Coltrane (1926–1967): jazz
- Ravi Coltrane (born 1965): jazz
- Sean Combs (born 1969): hip-hop, R&B
- Sam Cooke (1931–1964): soul, gospel, R&B
- Ida Cox (1888 or 1896–1967): blues, jazz
- Randy Crawford (born 1952): jazz, R&B, disco
- Tameka Cottle (born 1975): R&B, soul
- James Cotton (1935–2017): blues, jazz
- Robert Cray (born 1953): blues
- Ice Cube (born 1969): hip-hop
- Kid Cudi (born 1984): hip-hop, alternative rock
- Evelyn Simpson Curenton (born 1953): various
- King Curtis (1934–1971): soul, R&B, rock, funk, jazz

=== D ===
- D4vd (born 2005): indie rock, Pop, R&B
- Chuck D (born 1960): hip-hop
- Terence Trent D'arby (born 1962): Pop, R&B (African-American Mother)
- DaBaby (born 1991): hip-hop, trap
- Roscoe Dash (born 1990): hip-hop
- Diddy (born 1969): hip-hop
- Miles Davis (1926–1991): jazz
- Sammy Davis Jr. (1925–1990): pop, jazz, easy listening, swing
- Jimmy Dawkins (1928–2008): blues
- Jason Derulo (born 1989): R&B, hip-hop, pop
- Bo Diddley (1928–2008): R&B, rock and roll
- Raheem DeVaughn (born 1975): R&B, neo soul
- Fats Domino (1928–2017): rock and roll, boogie-woogie, New Orleans rhythm and blues
- Shea Diamond (born 1978): soul, R&B
- DDG (born 1997): hip-hop
- Mos Def (born 1973): hip-hop
- Ricky Dillard (born 1965): gospel
- Willie Dixon (1915–1992): blues, R&B, rock and roll, gospel
- Johnny Dodds (1892–1940): jazz
- Warren "Baby" Dodds (1898–1959): jazz
- Young Dolph (1985–2021): hip-hop
- Eric Dolphy (1928–1964): jazz
- Donnis (born 1984): hip-hop
- Nate Dogg (1969–2011): hip-hop, gangsta rap, R&B
- Snoop Dogg (born 1971): hip-hop, funk, gangsta rap
- Fats Domino (1928–2017): rock and roll, R&B
- Dr. Dre (born 1965): hip-hop
- Drake (born 1986): hip-hop, pop
- 42 Dugg (born 1994): hip-hop, trap
- Lil Durk (born 1992): hip-hop, drill
- Desiigner (born 1997): hip-hop, trap
- Derek Minor (born 1984): Christian hip-hop
- Dorrough (born 1986): hip-hop
- Duke Deuce (born 1992): hip-hop
- Doechii (born 1998): hip-hop
- Daveed Diggs (born 1982): Hip-hop, Rap-Rock (African-American Father & White Jewish-American Mother)

=== E ===
- E-40 (born 1967): hip-hop, rap
- Eazy-E (1963–1995): hip-hop, rap
- Dennis Edwards (1943–2018): R&B, soul
- Billy Eckstine (1914–1993): jazz, pop
- Roy Eldridge (1911–1989): jazz
- Duke Ellington (1899–1974): jazz
- Faith Evans (born 1973): R&B, hip-hop, soul
- Betty Everett (1939–2001): soul
- Cassandra Extavour: classical singer

=== F ===
- Fabolous (born 1977): hip-hop
- Fantasia (born 1984): R&B
- Art Farmer (1928–1999): jazz
- Mickey Fields (1932/33–1995): jazz
- Finesse2tymes (born 1992): hip-hop
- Ella Fitzgerald (1917–1996): jazz
- Roberta Flack (1937–2025): jazz, pop
- Flame (born 1981): Christian hip-hop
- Flavor Flav (born 1959): hip-hop
- Flo Rida (born 1979): hip-hop
- Eddie Floyd (born 1937): R&B, soul
- Foogiano (born 1996): hip-hop
- Fivio Foreign (born 1990): hip-hop
- Sonny Fortune (1939–2018): jazz
- Jamie Foxx (born 1967): R&B, pop, hip-hop
- Aretha Franklin (1942–2018): soul, gospel
- Erma Franklin (1938–2002): gospel, soul
- Kam Franklin (born 1987): soul
- Melvin Franklin (1942–1995): R&B, soul
- Kirk Franklin (born 1970): soul, gospel
- Future (born 1983): hip-hop
- Bankroll Freddie: hip-hop
- Fredo Bang (born 1996): hip-hop
- Big Freedia (born 1978): bounce
- Lowell Fulson (1921–1999): blues
- Future (born 1983): hip-hop, trap, R&B

=== G ===
- Polo G (born 1999): hip-hop, drill
- Slim Gaillard (1911–1991): jazz
- Childish Gambino: hip-hop, R&B
- The Game (born 1979): rapper
- Kevin Gates (born 1986): hip-hop
- Marvin Gaye (1939–1984): R&B, soul, funk, jazz, pop
- Gloria Gaynor (born 1943): disco, R&B
- Jamie Grace (born 1991): Christian pop, gospel
- Ginuwine (born 1970): R&B
- Diana Gordon (born 1985): R&B, dance-pop, house
- Gabrielle Goodman (born 1969): jazz, soul, gospel
- EST Gee (born 1994): hip-hop
- Tyrese Gibson (born 1978): hip-hop, R&B
- Dizzy Gillespie (1917–1993): jazz
- Ginuwine (born 1970): R&B
- GlokkNine (born 2000): hip-hop
- Ugly God (born 1996): hip-hop, SoundCloud hip-hop
- Benny Golson (1929–2024): jazz
- Dexter Gordon (1923–1990): jazz
- Berry Gordy (born 1929): R&B, soul, pop, R&R
- Martin Gore (born 1961): tock, electronic
- Al Green (born 1946): R&B, soul
- CeeLo Green (born 1975): R&B, hip-hop, soul, funk
- Thomasina Talley Greene: Classical pianist
- Johnny Griffin (1928–2008): jazz
- Lil Gotit (born 1999): hip-hop
- Tee Grizzley (born 1994): rapper
- Gucci Mane (born 1980): hip-hop
- Gunna (born 1993): hip-hop
- Buddy Guy (born 1936): blues
- Phil Guy (1940–2008): blues
- Sheila Guyse (1925–2013)

=== H ===
- Deitrick Haddon (born 1973): gospel
- Halsey (born 1994): pop
- H.E.R. (born 1997): R&B
- Adelaide Hall (1901–1993): jazz
- Edmond Hall (1901–1967): jazz
- Willie Hall (born 1950): R&B, soul, funk
- Todrick Hall (born 1985): R&B
- Charles Hamilton (born 1987): hip-hop
- Chico Hamilton (1921–2013): jazz
- Jimmy Hamilton (1917–1994): jazz
- MC Hammer (born 1962): R&B
- Fred Hammond (born 1960): gospel
- Lionel Hampton (1917–1994): jazz
- Herbie Hancock (born 1940): jazz, funk, electro
- Edward W. Hardy (born 1992): classical, pop, theatre music
- Roy Hargrove (1969–2018): jazz, soul
- Ciara Harris (born 1985): R&B, hip-hop, crunk&B, pop, dance
- Damon Harris (1950–2013): R&B, soul, pop
- Erline Harris (1914–2004): blues
- Donny Hathaway (1945–1979): soul, jazz, gospel, R&B, blues
- Richie Havens (1941–2013): folk rock, funk, blues, soul
- Koryn Hawthorne (born 1997): gospel
- Coleman Hawkins (1904–1969): jazz
- Isaac Hayes (1942–2008): blues, jazz, soul, funk, disco
- Nicole Heaston (born 1971): opera
- Fletcher Henderson (1897–1952): jazz
- Michael Henderson (1951–2022): R&B, jazz, funk, soul, pop
- Jon Hendricks (1921–2017): jazz
- Jimi Hendrix (1942–1970): rock guitarist, singer-songwriter
- Nona Hendryx (born 1944): funk, soul, pop, R&B, rock
- G Herbo (born 1995): hip-hop, drill
- Skinny Hightower (born 1985): jazz
- Andrew Hill (1931–2007): jazz
- Lauryn Hill (born 1975): R&B, neo soul, hip-hop, folk, reggae
- Z. Z. Hill (1935–1984): blues
- Keri Hilson (born 1982): R&B
- Earl Hines (1903–1983): jazz
- Hitmaka (born 1985): hip-hop
- Johnny Hodges (1907–1970): jazz
- Billie Holiday (1915–1959): soul, blues
- Jennifer Holliday (born 1960): R&B, soul, pop, house, dance, gospel
- John Lee Hooker (1917–2001): blues
- Hopsin (born 1985): hip-hop
- Shirley Horn (1934–2005): jazz
- Lena Horne (1917–2010): jazz, pop
- Cissy Houston (1933–2024): soul, gospel, disco
- Thelma Houston (born 1946): R&B, soul, disco, Motown, gospel
- Whitney Houston (1963–2012): R&B, pop, soul, gospel
- Adina Howard (born 1973): R&B, hip-hop, soul
- Freddie Hubbard (1938–2008): jazz
- Jennifer Hudson (born 1981): R&B, soul, pop
- Huey (1987–2020): hip-hop
- Alberta Hunter (1895–1984): jazz and blues
- Hurricane Chris (born 1989): hip-hop
- Nipsey Hussle (1985–2019): hip-hop, rap
- Phyllis Hyman (1949–1995): soul, R&B quiet, jazz, disco

=== I ===
- Ice-T (born 1958): hip-hop
- James Ingram (1952–2019): R&B, pop, soul
- Luther Ingram (1937–2007): R&B, soul
- Ronald Isley (born 1941): R&B, soul

=== J ===
- Ray J (born 1981): R&B
- Stevie J (born 1971): hip-hop, R&B
- Jadakiss: hip-hop
- Jackson family: pop, R&B, soul, dance
  - Rebbie Jackson (born 1950)
  - Jackie Jackson (born 1951)
  - Tito Jackson (1953–2024)
  - Jermaine Jackson (born 1954)
  - La Toya Jackson (born 1956)
  - Marlon Jackson (born 1957)
  - Michael Jackson (1958–2009)
  - Randy Jackson (born 1961)
  - Janet Jackson (born 1966)
- Bernard Jackson (born 1959): R&B
- Chuck Jackson (1937–2023): R&B
- Freddie Jackson (born 1956): soul
- Mahalia Jackson (1911–1972): gospel
- Millie Jackson (born 1944): soul, disco, R&B
- Milt Jackson (1923–1999): jazz
- Randy Jackson (born 1956)
- Jacquees (born 1994): R&B
- Etta James (1938–2012): blues, R&B, soul, jazz, gospel
- Rick James (1948–2004): R&B, soul, funk, rock
- Al Jarreau (1940–2017): jazz, R&B, soul
- Little Willie John (1937–1968): R&B, soul
- Charles Jenkins (born 1975): gospel
- Leroy Jenkins (1932–2007): jazz
- Lyfe Jennings (born 1978): R&B, soul
- Jeremih (born 1987): R&B, hip-hop
- Jibbs (born 1990): hip-hop
- Young Joc: hip-hop
- Joe (born 1973): R&B
- Robert Johnson (1911–1938): blues
- George W. Johnson (1846–1914)
- J. J. Johnson (1924–2001): jazz
- J. Rosamond Johnson (1873–1954)
- Syl Johnson (1936–2022): R&B, blues
- Coco Jones (born 1998): R&B
- Booker T. Jones: R&B, soul, blues
- Elvin Jones (1927–2004): jazz
- Etta Jones (1928–2001): jazz
- Howard Jones (born 1970): rock
- Hank Jones (1918–2010): jazz
- Mike Jones (born 1981): hip-hop
- Quincy Jones (1933–2024): R&B, funk, soul, jazz, hip-hop, rock and roll, pop
- Scott Joplin (1868–1917): ragtime
- Louis Jordan (1908–1975): jazz, blues, R&B
- Steve Jordan: pop, rock, R&B
- Montell Jordan (born 1968): R&B, hip-hop, soul
- BlocBoy JB (born 1996): hip-hop
- Valerie June (born 1982): folk, blues, soul, bluegrass, pop
- LL Cool J: hip-hop
- Lil Jon: hip-hop
- J-Kwon: hip-hop
- Juice WRLD (1998–2019): hip-hop, rap, Pop-rap
- Jaheim (born 1978): R&B, Soul

=== K ===
- Lil Keed (1998–2022): hip-hop
- Chief Keef (born 1995): hip-hop, drill
- Kehlani (African-American father): R&B, soul, jazz, hip-hop
- Kelis (born 1979): hip-hop (African-American, Chinese and Puerto Rican) R&B, pop, soul, electronic
- R. Kelly (born 1967): R&B, soul, gospel, hip-hop
- Wynton Kelly (1931–1971): jazz
- Eddie Kendricks: R&B, soul, disco
- Alicia Keys (born 1981): R&B, soul, pop, hip-hop
- Chaka Khan (born 1953): R&B, pop, soul, disco, jazz, gospel
- Kilo Kish: hip-hop, art pop
- Eartha Kitt (1927–2008): cabaret, torch, jazz
- Albert King (1923–1992): blues
- B.B. King (1925–2015): blues, R&B
- Ben E King (1938–2015): R&B
- Freddie King (1934–1976): blues
- Gladys Knight (born 1944): soul, R&B, pop
- Solange Knowles (born 1986): R&B, pop, soul, hip-hop, funk
- Lenny Kravitz (born 1964): rock, pop rock, progressive soul
- Khalid: R&B, pop
- Wiz Khalifa: hip-hop
- Kid Cudi: hip-hop
- Maxo Kream (born 1990): hip-hop (Nigerian and African-American)
- KB: Christian hip-hop

=== L ===
- Big L (1974–1999): hip-hop
- Patti LaBelle (born 1944): R&B, soul, disco, dance, gospel, funk
- Steve Lacy (born 1998): R&B, Bedroom Pop, Indie Soul, Alternative Pop (African-American mother and Filipino Dad)
- Denise LaSalle (1939–2018): blues, R&B, soul
- Kendrick Lamar (born 1987): hip-hop, rap
- John Larkin (1877–1936): minstrel, vaudeville
- Queen Latifah (born 1970): hip-hop, R&B, soul, jazz, gospel, dance
- Kenny Lattimore (born 1970): R&B
- Lynda Laurence (born 1949): R&B, pop, jazz
- Bettye LaVette (born 1946): soul, blues, rock, R&B, funk, gospel, country
- Lecrae (born 1979): Christian hip-hop
- Huddie Ledbetter (1888–1949): folk, blues
- Tasha Cobbs Leonard (born 1981): gospel
- Swae Lee (born 1993): hip-hop, R&B
- John Legend (born 1978): pop, R&B, soul
- Coi Leray (born 1997): hip-hop
- Abbey Lincoln (1930–2010): jazz
- Lil Nas X (born 1999): hip-hop, pop, country, trap
- Lizzo (born 1988): R&B, pop
- Eddie Levert (born 1942): R&B, soul, blues, gospel
- Gerald Levert (1946–2006): soul, R&B
- Ari Lennox (born 1991): R&B, soul, neo soul
- Coi Leray (born 1997): hip-hop
- Booker Little (1938–1961): jazz
- Frankie Lymon (1942–1968): R&B, doo-wop, pop, swing
- Barbara Lynn (born 1942): R&B
- Cheryl Lynn (born 1957): disco, R&B, soul, pop
- Lisa Lopes (1971–2002): R&B, rap, pop
- Ledisi (born 1972): R&B, soul, jazz
- Logic (born 1990): hip-hop
- Dej Loaf (born 1991): hip-hop, R&B
- Ludacris (born 1977): hip-hop
- Lil Uzi Vert (born 1995): hip-hop
- Lil Nas X (born 1999): hip-hop, country
- Lizzo (born 1988): R&B
- Lloyd (born 1986): R&B
- Trip Lee (born 1987): Christian hip-hop, Southern hip-hop
- Lil Scrappy (born 1984): hip-hop
- Tone Loc (born 1966): Golden age Hip-Hop, Pop Rap

=== M ===
- Young M.A (born 1992): hip-hop
- Mandisa (1976–2024): gospel, Christian
- Barbara Mason (born 1947): R&B, soul
- Johnny Mathis (born 1935): pop, jazz
- Curtis Mayfield (1942–1999): soul, funk, R&B
- China Anne McClain (born 1998): R&B, pop
- Lauryn McClain (born 1997): R&B, pop
- Christian McBride: jazz
- Gene McDaniels: jazz, pop
- Donnie McClurkin: Gospel
- Betty McGlown (1941–2008): R&B, pop
- Joe McPhee: jazz
- Sierra McClain (born 1994): R&B, pop
- Brian McKnight (born 1969): R&B
- Carmen McRae (1920–1994): jazz
- Lee Michelle: (African-American father) K Pop singer
- Buddy Miles: R&B, funk, soul
- Meek Mill: hip-hop
- Stephanie Mills: R&B, soul, gospel
- Blue Mitchell: jazz
- Wanya Morris (born 1973): R&B, soul
- Janelle Monáe (born 1985): funk, R&B, psychedelic soul, hip-hop
- YNW Melly (born 1999): hip-hop, trap, R&B
- Mýa (born 1979): R&B (African-American father, Italian mother)
- Miguel (born 1985): R&B
- K. Michelle (born 1982): R&B, soul
- Teairra Marí (born 1987): R&B
- Mario (born 1986): R&B
- Monica (born 1980): R&B, soul, hip-hop soul
- Victoria Monét (born 1989): pop, R&B
- Chrisette Michele (born 1982): R&B, hip-hop, soul, jazz
- Remy Ma (born 1980): hip-hop
- Barbara Martin: R&B, pop
- Johnny Mathis: pop, jazz
- Curtis Mayfield (1942–1999): soul, funk, R&B
- Taj Mahal: blues, R&B, jazz
- Hank Mobley: jazz
- Thelonious Monk: jazz
- Wes Montgomery (1923–1968): jazz
- Melba Moore (born 1945): soul, disco, gospel
- Lee Morgan: jazz
- Migos: hip-hop, trap
- Gucci Mane: hip-hop, trap
- Miguel (African-American mother): hip-hop, R&B
- Tamela Mann (born 1966): gospel
- Mulatto (born 1998): hip-hop
- Matt "Guitar" Murphy (1929–2018): blues
- Lil' Mo (born 1978): R&B, hip-hop
- Method Man (born 1971): hip-hop
- Maliibu Miitch (born 1991): hip-hop (African-American, Vietnamese and Filipino)
- Mims (born 1981): hip-hop
- Maino (born 1973): hip-hop
- Money Man (born 1986): hip-hop
- Vic Mensa (born 1993): hip-hop,Dance (American Mother of Irish and Scottish Descent & Ghanaian-American father)

=== N ===
- Nonpoint (born 1975): rock
- Rico Nasty (born 1997): hip-hop, rock, rap rock
- Meshell Ndegeocello (born 1968): funk, soul, jazz, hip-hop, reggae, rock
- Anthony Nelson (born 1975): gospel
- Aaron Neville (born 1941): R&B, soul, country, gospel, jazz, pop
- Art Neville (1937–2019): funk, R&B, soul
- Cyril Neville: R&B, funk, blues
- Charles Neville: R&B, jazz, funk, pop
- Oliver Nelson: jazz
- David "Fathead" Newman: jazz
- Jessye Norman (born 1945): opera
- Brandy Norwood (born 1979): R&B, pop, hip-hop
- Lil Nas X (born 1999): hip-hop, LGBT hip-hop, pop rap, country rap
- Ne-Yo (born 1979): R&B
- Nivea (born 1982): R&B, hip-hop
- Noname Gypsy (born 1991): hip-hop
- Normani (born 1996): pop, R&B
- Tech N9ne: hip-hop
- Nas: hip-hop
- Nathan Morris: vocal, singer
- Nelly: hip-hop
- Meshell Ndegeocello: funk, soul, jazz
- Queen Naija (African-American mother):
- NBA YoungBoy (born 1999): rapper

=== O ===
- Alexander O'Neal (born 1953): R&B, soul
- Jeffrey Osborne (born 1948): R&B, soul
- Frank Ocean (born 1987): R&B
- Omarion (born 1984): R&B
- Offset (born 1991): hip-hop
- Odetta (1930–2008): blues, jazz
- OJ da Juiceman (born 1981): hip-hop
- OMB Peezy (born 1997): hip-hop

=== P ===
- Anderson .Paak (born 1986): hip-hop, R&B, soul, pop, funk
- Petey Pablo (born 1973): hip-hop
- Keke Palmer (born 1993): R&B, hip-hop, pop
- Ray Parker Jr. (born 1954): R&B, pop
- Billy Paul (1934–2016): soul, R&B, jazz
- Scherrie Payne (born 1944): R&B, pop, disco
- Paul Pena (1950–2005): Delta blues, jazz, morna, flamenco, folk, rock, Tuvan throat singing
- Pleasure P (born 1984): R&B
- Teddy Pendergrass (1950–2010): R&B, soul, disco, funk
- Richard Wayne Penniman (Little Richard) (1932–2020): rock & roll, R&B, gospel, soul
- Pharrell (born 1973): hip-hop, R&B, funk
- Wilson Pickett (1941–2006): R&B, soul
- Jillian Patricia Pirtle (born 1983): opera, musical theatre
- Plies (born 1976): hip-hop
- Billy Porter (born 1969): R&B, soul
- Gregory Porter (born 1971): jazz
- Billy Preston (1946–2006): R&B, rock, soul, funk, gospel
- Kelly Price (born 1973): gospel
- Leontyne Price (born 1927): opera
- Charley Pride (1934–2020): country
- Arthur Prysock (1924 or 1929–1997): jazz, R&B, easy listening
- Prince (1958–2016): pop, rock
- Pointer Sisters : R&B, Soul, Pop

=== Q ===
- Rich Homie Quan: hip-hop
- Quando Rondo: hip-hop
- Quavo: hip-hop
- DJ Quik: hip-hop

=== R ===
- Raheem Jarbo: hip-hop
- Rakim: hip-hop
- Rapsody: hip-hop
- Raz-B: R&B
- Sun Ra: jazz
- Lou Rawls (1933–2006): gospel, R&B, soul, jazz, blues
- Ma Rainey (1882 or 1886–1939): blues
- Jimmy Reed (1925–1976): blues
- Louisiana Red (1932–2012): blues
- Otis Redding (1941–1967): soul, R&B, blues
- Della Reese (1931–2017): jazz, gospel, pop
- Lil Reese (born 1993): hip-hop, drill
- Dianne Reeves (born 1956): jazz
- Martha Reeves (born 1941): R&B, pop
- Roddy Ricch (born 1998): hip-hop
- Lionel Richie (born 1949): soul, R&B, pop, country, gospel
- Little Richard (1932–2020): rock and roll, R&B, gospel, soul
- Pretty Ricky: R&B
- Teddy Riley (born 1967): R&B, hip-hop
- Flo Rida (born 1979): hip-hop, hip house, pop rap
- Minnie Riperton (1947–1979): soul, R&B, jazz, disco
- Max Roach (1924–2007): jazz
- Black Rob: hip-hop
- Paul Robeson (1898–1976): Americana, pop, spirituals, classical, folk
- Bill "Bojangles" Robinson (1878–1949): minstrel, vaudeville, jazz, pop
- Smokey Robinson (born 1940): R&B, soul, pop
- Sylvia Robinson (1935–2011): R&B, soul, hip-hop
- ASAP Rocky: hip-hop (half-African American, half-Barbadian)
- Nile Rodgers: disco, soul, R&B, rock, funk
- Diana Ross (born 1944): R&B, soul, disco, jazz, pop, dance
- Rick Ross: hip-hop
- Sonny Rollins (1930–2026): jazz
- Kelly Rowland (born 1981): R&B, pop, hip-hop, soul, dance
- Otis Rush (1934–2018): blues, R&B
- Patrice Rushen (born 1954): R&B
- Trippie Redd (born 1999): hip-hop
- RuPaul (born 1960): dance, pop
- David Ruffin (1941–1991): R&B, pop, soul, disco, gospel
- Jimmy Ruffin (1936–2014): R&B, soul, pop
- Chance the Rapper: hip-hop, R&B
- Rocko: hip-hop, rap
- Ja Rule: hip-hop
- Raekwon: hip-hop
- Renni Rucci: hip-hop

=== S ===
- Saweetie: hip-hop (African-American father, Chinese and Filipino mother)
- Pharoah Sanders: jazz
- Juelz Santana: hip-hop
- Saucy Santana: hip-hop
- Marvin Sapp: gospel
- Young Scooter (1986–2025): hip-hop
- Jill Scott (born 1972): R&B, soul, neo soul, hip-hop, spoken word, jazz
- Jimmy Scott (1925–2014): jazz
- Peggy Scott-Adams (born 1948): blues, R&B
- Travis Scott (born 1991): hip-hop
- Gil Scott-Heron (1949–2011): soul, funk, R&B
- Dee Dee Sharp (born 1945): R&B, blues, soul
- Marlena Shaw (born 1942): jazz, blues and soul
- Tupac Shakur (1971–1996): hip-hop, revolutionary, poet, freedom fighter
- Kierra Sheard (born 1987): urban gospel, R&B
- Pooh Shiesty: hip-hop, Southern hip-hop, Memphis rap
- Bobby Shmurda: hip-hop, Brooklyn drill
- Karen Clark Sheard: gospel, urban gospel
- Wayne Shorter (1933–2023): jazz
- Bobby Short: jazz
- Nina Simone (1933–2003): jazz, blues, folk, R&B, gospel, pop
- Sister Rosetta Tharpe: blues
- Magic Sam (1937–2013): blues
- Magic Slim (1937–2013): blues
- Memphis Slim (1915–1988): blues
- Horace Silver (1928–2014): Jazz
- Percy Sledge (1941–2015): R&B, soul, gospel
- Jordin Sparks (born 1989): R&B, pop
- Ronnie Spector aka Veronica Yvette Bennett (1943–2022): R&B, pop, soul, doo-wop
- Bessie Smith (1894–1937): blues
- O. C. Smith (1932–2001): R&B, jazz, soul
- Jimmy Smith: jazz
- Rae Sremmurd: hip-hop, trap, R&B
- Mavis Staples (born 1939): soul, gospel, R&B
- Edwin Starr (1942–2003): soul, R&B, funk, disco
- Candi Staton (born 1940): soul, R&B, gospel, dance, disco
- Dakota Staton (1930–2007): jazz
- Angie Stone (1961–2025): R&B, soul
- Sly Stone (1943–2025): funk, R&B
- Ruben Studdard (born 1978): singer
- Shawn Stockman (born 1972): R&B
- Billy Strayhorn (1915–1967): jazz
- Jazmine Sullivan (born 1987): R&B
- Maxine Sullivan (1911–1987): jazz
- Donna Summer (1948–2012): disco, rock, dance, R&B
- Sisqó (born 1978): R&B, hip-hop soul, pop
- Raven-Symoné (born 1985): R&B, hip-hop
- SZA (born 1989): R&B
- Keith Sweat (born 1961): R&B, new jack swing, hip-hop, soul, urban
- Sylvester (1947–1988): disco
- Big Sean: hip-hop, Midwest hip-hop
- Pink Sweats: pop
- Musiq Soulchild: R&B, soul, neo soul
- Raphael Saadiq (born 1966): R&B, soul
- Trey Songz: R&B, hip—hop
- Keith Sweat: R&B, soul, hip-hop, urban
- Southside: Hip-hop
- Musiq Soulchild: R&B
- SZA: pop, R&B, soul
- Beanie Sigel: hip-hop
- Swoope: Christian hip-hop, Urban contemporary gospel
- Shawty Lo: hip-hop
- Shy Glizzy: hip-hop
- Silentó: hip-hop
- Jermaine Stewart: R&B
- Mamie Smith (1891–1946): jazz, blues
- Slayr (born 2007): Dance-pop, Trap
- Sosocamo: Trap, Hip-Hop, Pop
- Victoria Spivey: blues

=== T ===
- T.I.: hip-hop
- T-Pain: Hip-hop, R&B
- Takeoff (1994–2022): hip-hop, trap
- Tank: hip-hop
- Art Tatum (1909–1956): jazz
- Billy Taylor (1921–2010): jazz
- Cecil Taylor (1929–2018): jazz
- Johnnie Taylor (1934–2000): R&B, soul, blues
- Koko Taylor: blues, soul
- Teyana Taylor (born 1990): R&B, hip-hop, pop
- T-Pain (born 1984): R&B, hip-hop, pop rap
- Jean Terrell: R&B, soul, jazz
- Tammi Terrell (1945–1970): R&B, soul, pop
- Clark Terry: jazz
- Joe Tex (1935–1982): R&B, soul, funk, disco
- Rufus Thomas (1917–2001): R&B, funk, soul, blues
- Rozonda Thomas: R&B
- Lillo Thomas (1961): R&B, Funk, Soul, Pop, New Jack Swing
- Bryson Tiller: R&B, hip-hop
- Big Joe Turner (1911–1985): blues, R&B
- Ike Turner (1931–2007): R&B, blues, rock and roll, funk
- Tina Turner (1939–2023): R&B, pop, soul, dance, rock and roll
- The-Dream (born 1977): R&B
- Young Thug (born 1991): hip-hop
- Stanley Turrentine: jazz
- McCoy Tyner (1938–2020): jazz
- Tye Tribbett: gospel
- Tweet (born 1971): R&B
- TLC: R&B, pop
- Pusha T: hip-hop
- Tyler, the Creator: hip-hop
- Twista: hip-hop
- Timbaland: hip-hop, R&B, dance
- Tedashii: Christian hip-hop
- Thi'sl: Christian hip-hop

=== U ===
- Unk (born 1981): hip-hop
- Usher (born 1978): R&B, pop

=== V ===
- V.I.C.: hip-hop
- Bobby V (born 1980): R&B
- Brooke Valentine (born 1984): R&B, pop, hip-hop, crunk
- Luther Vandross (1951–2005): soul
- Sarah Vaughan (1924–1990): jazz
- Cassie Ventura (born 1986): R&B
- Tommy Vext (born 1982): rock
- King Von: hip-hop, drill, gangsta rap

=== W ===
- Wale (born 1984): hip-hop
- Hezekiah Walker: gospel
- Sippie Wallace (1898–1986): blues
- Fats Waller (1904–1943): jazz, pop
- Little Walter (1930–1968): blues, R&B
- Fetty Wap (born 1991): hip-hop
- William Warfield (1920–2002): opera, pop
- Dionne Warwick (born 1940): gospel, R&B, soul, pop
- Dinah Washington (1924–1963): jazz, blues, R&B, gospel, traditional pop
- Gino Washington (born 1946?): R&B, rock
- Grover Washington Jr. (1943–1999): jazz, soul, R&B
- Ethel Waters (1896–1977): blues, jazz, Broadway, big band, pop
- Muddy Waters (1913–1983): blues
- Tionne Watkins (born 1970): R&B
- Johnny "Guitar" Watson: blues, soul, funk
- Lil Wayne (born 1982): hip-hop
- Carl Weathersby (1953–2024): blues
- Keenan Webb, also known as "DJ Suede the Remix God": Trap, hip-hop
- Webbie (born 1985): hip-hop
- Junior Wells (1934–1998): blues
- Mary Wells (1943–1992) R&B, pop, soul, rock
- Kanye West (born 1977): hip-hop, pop, R&B, Christian hip-hop, gospel
- Glodean White (born 1946): R&B, soul, funk, disco
- Maurice White: soul, funk, R&B, jazz
- Barry White (1944–2003): soul, R&B, pop
- Eddie Willis: soul, R&B
- Wesley Willis: punk rock
- will.i.am (born 1975): hip-hop, pop, R&B
- Andre Williams: R&B, blues
- Bert Williams (1874–1922): Broadway, vaudeville, minstrel
- Hayley Williams (born 1988): rock
- Joe Williams (1918–1999): jazz
- Lee Williams (1946–2021): gospel
- Lenny Williams (born 1945): soul, R&B, jazz
- Otis Williams: R&B, soul, disco
- Marion Williams (1927–1994): gospel
- Michelle Williams: R&B, gospel, pop, soul
- Paul Williams (1939–1973): R&B, soul
- Pharrell Williams (born 1973): hip-hop, R&B, funk, pop
- Sonny Boy Williamson I (1914–1948): blues
- Sonny Boy Williamson II (1912–1965): blues
- Charlie Wilson (born 1953): R&B, hip-hop, soul, funk
- Gerald Wilson: jazz, pop
- Jackie Wilson (1934–1984): R&B, soul
- Nancy Wilson (1937–2018): jazz
- Mary Wilson (1944–2021): R&B, soul, pop, funk
- CeCe Winans (born 1964): gospel
- Mario Winans (born 1974): R&B
- Lawrence Winters (né Lawrence Lafayette Whisonant) (1915–1965): opera, concert
- Bill Withers (1938–2020): soul, R&B, smooth soul, blues, funk
- Jimmy Witherspoon (1920–1997): blues, jazz
- Lajon Witherspoon (born 1972): rock
- Juice Wrld (1998–2019): SoundCloud rap, emo rap, alternative rock, pop
- Howlin' Wolf (1910–1976): blues
- Stevie Wonder (born 1950): soul, pop
- Bobby Womack (1944–2014): soul, R&B
- Brenton Wood (1941–2025): soul, R&B, pop
- Ali-Ollie Woodson (1951–2010): R&B, pop, soul
- Betty Wright (1953–2020): soul, R&B
- Lizz Wright (born 1980): jazz, gospel
- O. V. Wright (1939–1980): blues
- Bow Wow (born 1987): hip-hop
- Juice WRLD (1998 –2019): hip-hop, R&B, trap

=== X ===
- XXXTentacion (1998–2018): hip-hop, SoundCloud rap, lo-fi
- Xzibit (born 1974): hip-hop

=== Y ===
- Ne-Yo (born 1979): R&B
- Yo Gotti (born 1981): hip-hop
- Lester Young (1909–1959): jazz
- Young Dro (born 1979): hip-hop
- Young Buck (born 1981): hip-hop
- Yung Joc (born 1980): hip-hop

=== Z ===
- Jay-Z (born 1969): hip-hop
