= Lil Baby discography =

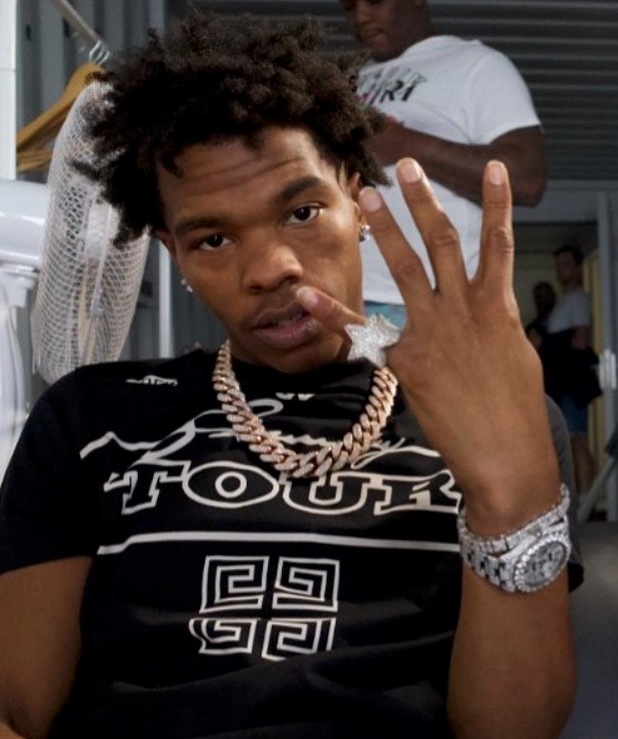
- Lil Baby in 2019
- Studio albums: 4
- Compilation albums: 2
- Singles: 119
- Collaborative albums: 1
- Mixtapes: 6

The discography of Lil Baby, an American rapper, consists of four studio albums, one collaborative album, two compilation albums (both as a part of Quality Control Music), six mixtapes (including two collaborative mixtapes), and 119 singles (including 72 as a featured artist). His music has been released on the record labels Capitol, Motown, Quality Control Music, YSL Records, and his independently-owned record label, Glass Window (or 4PF). With 76 million digital units sold in the United States, Lil Baby is among the highest certified artists in the United States. Lil Baby has achieved four number-one albums on the Billboard 200, 13 top-ten entries on the Billboard Hot 100, and has accumulated 155 total entries on the Billboard Hot 100—the 7th most in the chart's history.

== Albums ==
=== Studio albums ===
List of studio albums, with selected chart positions, sales figures and certifications
Title	Album details	Peak chart positions										Sales (Note: Sales figures for albums, EPs, and singles are pure sales that do not take equivalent units into account.)	Certifications
Title	Album details	US	US R&B/HH	US Rap	AUS	CAN	FRA	IRE	NZ	SWI	UK	Sales	Certifications
Harder Than Ever	Released: May 18, 2018; Label: Quality Control, Motown, Capitol; Format: CD, LP, digital download, streaming	3	2	2	—	9	—	—	—	—	—		RIAA: Platinum; BPI: Silver; MC: Gold; RMNZ: Gold
My Turn	Released: February 28, 2020; Label: Quality Control, Motown; Format: CD, LP, digital download, streaming	1	1	1	20	2	60	12	19	20	6	US: 105,400 (Note: In 2020 the album sold 73,900 pure copies, 22,000 in 2021, 6,000 in 2022, and 3,500 in 2023)	RIAA: 7× Platinum; BPI: Gold; RMNZ: Platinum
It's Only Me	Released: October 14, 2022; Label: Quality Control, Motown; Format: CD, LP, digital download, streaming	1	1	1	7	1	36	6	8	4	3	US: 14,200 (Note: In 2022 the album sold 9,000 pure copies, and in 5,200 in 2023)	RIAA: Platinum; BPI: Gold
WHAM	Released: January 3, 2025; Label: Quality Control, Motown; Format: CD, digital download, streaming	1	1	1	42	8	—	27	21	4	12	US: 50,000	
Fresh	Released: November 6, 2026; Label: Quality Control, Motown; Format: Digital download, streaming	2	1	1	—	29	—	—	—	93	82	US: 4,000	
"—" denotes a recording that did not chart or was not released in that territory.

=== Collaborative albums ===
List of collaborative albums, with selected chart positions, sales figures and certifications
Title	Album details	Peak chart positions										Sales (Note: Sales figures for albums, EPs, and singles are pure sales that do not take equivalent units into account.)	Certifications
Title	Album details	US	US R&B/HH	US Rap	AUS	CAN	FRA	IRE	NZ	SWI	UK	Sales	Certifications
The Voice of the Heroes (with Lil Durk)	Released: June 4, 2021; Label: Quality Control, Motown, Alamo; Format: CD, LP, digital download, streaming	1	1	1	20	2	103	17	21	10	5	US: 15,000 (Note: In 2021 the album sold 15,000 pure copies)	RIAA: Platinum

=== Compilation albums ===
Title	Album details
Quality Control: Control the Streets, Volume 1 (as part of Quality Control)	Released: December 8, 2017; Label: Quality Control, Capitol, Motown; Format: CD, digital download, streaming
Quality Control: Control the Streets, Volume 2 (as part of Quality Control)	Released: August 16, 2019; Label: Quality Control, Motown; Format: CD, digital download, streaming

== Mixtapes ==
List of mixtapes, with selected chart positions and certifications
Title	Mixtape details	Peak chart positions										Certifications
Title	Mixtape details	US	US R&B/HH	US Rap	AUS	CAN	FRA	IRE	NZ	SWI	UK	Certifications
Perfect Timing	Released: April 14, 2017; Label: 4PF, Wolfpack, Quality Control; Format: Digital download, streaming	—	—	—	—	—	—	—	—	—	—	
Harder Than Hard	Released: July 18, 2017; Label: 4PF, Wolfpack, Quality Control; Format: Digital download, streaming	—	—	—	—	—	—	—	—	—	—	
2 the Hard Way (with Marlo)	Released: October 9, 2017; Label: 4PF, Wolfpack, Quality Control; Format: Digital download, streaming	—	—	—	—	—	—	—	—	—	—	
Too Hard	Released: December 1, 2017; Label: 4PF, Wolfpack, Quality Control; Format: Digital download, streaming	80	33	24	—	—	—	—	—	—	—	RIAA: Gold
Drip Harder (with Gunna)	Released: October 5, 2018; Label: Quality Control, YSL, 300 Motown, Capitol; Format: CD, LP, digital download, streaming	4	2	2	45	3	—	39	—	82	12	RIAA: Platinum; BPI: Silver; MC: Gold; RMNZ: Platinum
Street Gossip	Released: November 30, 2018; Label: Quality Control, Motown, Capitol; Format: CD, LP, digital download, streaming	2	2	2	—	7	173	89	—	—	50	RIAA: Gold; BPI: Silver; RMNZ: Gold
The Leaks	Released: December 3, 2025; Label: Quality Control, Motown; Format: Digital download, streaming	17	5	1	—	82	—	—	—	—	— (Note: The Leaks did not enter the UK albums chart, but peaked at 61 on the UK Album Streaming Chart.)	
"—" denotes a recording that did not chart or was not released in that territory.

== Singles ==
=== As lead artist ===
List of singles as lead artist, with selected chart positions, showing year released and album name
Title	Year	Peak chart positions										Certifications	Album
Title	Year	US	US R&B/HH	US Rap	AUS	CAN	FRA	IRE	SWE	UK	WW	Certifications	Album
"My Dawg"	2017	71	29	—	—	—	—	—	—	—	—	RIAA: Platinum; MC: Gold	Harder Than Hard
"2 the Hard Way" (with Marlo)	2017	—	—	—	—	—	—	—	—	—	—		2 the Hard Way
"Freestyle"	2017	59	17	8	—	69	—	—	—	—	169	RIAA: 3× Platinum; BPI: Platinum; MC: Gold; RMNZ: Platinum	Too Hard
"All of a Sudden" (featuring Moneybagg Yo)	2017	—	— (Note: "All of a Sudden" did not enter the Billboard Hot R&B/Hip-Hop Songs chart, but peaked at number five on the Bubbling Under R&B/Hip-Hop Singles chart.)	—	—	—	—	—	—	—	—	RIAA: Platinum	Too Hard
"Southside"	2018	79	39	—	—	—	—	—	—	—	—	RIAA: Gold	Harder Than Ever
"Yes Indeed" (with Drake)	2018	6	5	5	68	7	—	65	91	46	—	RIAA: 7× Platinum; BPI: Platinum; MC: 3× Platinum; RMNZ: 2× Platinum	Harder Than Ever
"Drip Too Hard" (with Gunna)	2018	4	3	3	—	10	—	50	97	28	—	RIAA: Diamond; BPI: 2× Platinum; MC: 4× Platinum; RMNZ: 4× Platinum	Drip Harder
"Close Friends"	2019	28	16	13	—	74	—	—	—	68	—	RIAA: 5× Platinum; BPI: Platinum; MC: Gold; RMNZ: Platinum	Drip Harder
"Phone Down" (with Stefflon Don)	2019	—	—	—	—	—	—	—	—	68	—		Non-album singles
"Out the Mud" (with Future)	2019	70	24	20	—	—	—	—	—	—	—	RIAA: Platinum	Non-album singles
"Baby" (with Quality Control and DaBaby)	2019	21	11	9	—	54	—	—	—	—	—	RMNZ: Platinum	Control the Streets, Volume 2
"Toast Up" (featuring Ali Tomineek and Shad on the Beat)	2019	—	—	—	—	—	—	—	—	—	—		Non-album single
"Woah"	2019	15	7	5	—	28	—	93	—	66	—	RIAA: 8× Platinum; BPI: Silver; RMNZ: Gold	My Turn
"Sum 2 Prove"	2020	16	9	7	—	43	—	—	—	94	—	RIAA: 9× Platinum; BPI: Silver; MC: Platinum; RMNZ: Platinum	My Turn
"Emotionally Scarred"	2020	31	16	13	—	85	—	—	—	78	—	RIAA: 7× Platinum; BPI: Gold; RMNZ: Gold	My Turn
"All In"	2020	45	20	17	—	84	—	—	—	—	—	RIAA: Platinum	My Turn
"The Bigger Picture"	2020	3	3	3	—	18	—	65	—	54	—	RIAA: 3× Platinum; RMNZ: Gold	My Turn
"Errbody"	2020	41	8	7	—	56	—	—	—	—	58		Non-album singles
"On Me" (solo or remix with Megan Thee Stallion)	2020	15	7	6	—	57	—	—	—	—	47	RIAA: 3× Platinum; BPI: Gold; MC: Platinum; RMNZ: Platinum	Non-album singles
"Real as It Gets" (featuring EST Gee)	2021	34	17	13	—	52	—	—	—	—	54	RIAA: Platinum	Non-album singles
"Ramen & OJ" (with Joyner Lucas)	2021	67	30	24	—	56	—	84	—	—	104	RIAA: Platinum; RMNZ: Gold	Non-album singles
"We Win" (with Kirk Franklin)	2021	—	— (Note: "We Win" did not enter the Hot R&B/Hip-Hop Songs chart but peaked at number 22 on the Mainstream R&B/Hip-Hop Airplay chart.)	—	—	—	—	—	—	—	—		Space Jam: A New Legacy
"Voice of the Heroes" (with Lil Durk)	2021	21	7	5	—	43	—	98	—	62	35	RIAA: Gold	The Voice of the Heroes
"Silence" (with Like Mike)	2021	—	—	—	—	—	—	—	—	—	—		Non-album singles
"Flights" (with BandoPop)	2021	—	—	—	—	—	—	—	—	—	—		Non-album singles
"Do We Have a Problem?" (with Nicki Minaj)	2022	2	1	1	64	14	193	48	—	31	7	RIAA: Platinum	Queen Radio: Volume 1
"Bussin" (with Nicki Minaj)	2022	20	5	4	—	40	—	89	—	70	27		Queen Radio: Volume 1
"Don't Make Me Beg" (with Hylan Starr)	2022	—	—	—	—	—	—	—	—	—	—		Non-album singles
"Vulture Island V2" (with Rob49)	2022	—	—	—	—	—	—	—	—	—	—	RIAA: Gold	Non-album singles
"Right On"	2022	13	5	4	—	28	—	80	—	78	26	RIAA: Platinum	Non-album singles
"In a Minute"	2022	14	5	4	—	38	—	76	—	44	27	RIAA: 3× Platinum; BPI: Silver	It's Only Me
"Frozen"	2022	54	25	22	—	78	—	—	—	—	99		Non-album singles
"U-Digg" (with 42 Dugg and Veeze)	2022	52	16	8	—	69	—	—	—	—	108		Non-album singles
"Never Sleep" (with Nav featuring Travis Scott)	2022	50	19	8	—	23	—	—	—	95	71	MC: Gold	Demons Protected by Angels
"Detox"	2022	25	8	6	—	48	—	—	—	95	59		Non-album single
"Heyy"	2022	21	10	9	—	45	—	—	—	—	38	RIAA: Platinum	It's Only Me
"Go Hard"	2023	59	17	9	—	70	—	—	—	—	179		Non-album singles
"Merch Madness"	2023	— (Note: "Merch Madness" did not enter the Billboard Hot 100, but peaked at number eight on the Bubbling Under Hot 100 Singles chart.)	30	21	—	—	—	—	—	—	—		Non-album singles
"Supposed to Be Loved" (with DJ Khaled and Future featuring Lil Uzi Vert)	2023	52	15	13	—	—	—	—	—	—	—		Aalam of God
"Okay" (with French Montana and ATL Jacob)	2023	—	—	—	—	—	—	—	—	—	—		Mac & Cheese 5
"Crazy"	2023	83	20	16	—	—	—	—	—	—	—		Non-album singles
"350"	2023	— (Note: "350" did not enter the Billboard Hot 100, but peaked at number three on the Bubbling Under Hot 100 Singles chart.)	31	—	—	—	—	—	—	—	—		Non-album singles
"Band4Band" (with Central Cee)	2024	18	6	4	9	11	84	9	19	3	12	RIAA: Platinum; BPI: Platinum; MC: Platinum; RMNZ: Platinum	Can't Rush Greatness
"Choppa" (with Byron Messia and Rvssian)	2024	—	—	—	—	—	—	—	—	—	—		Non-album singles
"Roll da Dice" (with 4Batz)	2024	— (Note: "Roll da Dice" did not enter the Billboard Hot 100, but peaked at number 23 on the Bubbling Under Hot 100 Singles chart.)	—	—	—	—	—	—	—	—	—		Non-album singles
"5AM"	2024	— (Note: "5AM" did not enter the Billboard Hot 100, but peaked at number two on the Bubbling Under Hot 100 chart.)	29	24	—	—	—	—	—	—	—		Non-album singles
"Insecurities"	2024	56	10	7	—	—	—	—	—	—	—		Non-album singles
"Touchdown"	2024	— (Note: "Touchdown" did not enter the Billboard Hot 100, but peaked at number 11 on the Bubbling Under Hot 100 chart.)	39	—	—	—	—	—	—	—	—		Non-album singles
"Legends" (with Quavo)	2025	— (Note: "Legends" did not enter the Billboard Hot 100, but peaked at number 1 on the Bubbling Under Hot 100 chart.)	23	14	—	—	—	—	—	—	—		Non-album singles
"All on Me" (featuring G Herbo)	2025	— (Note: "All on Me" did not enter the Billboard Hot 100, but peaked at number 6 on the Bubbling Under Hot 100 chart.)	28	17	—	—	—	—	—	—	—		The Leaks
"Plenty" (with YTB Fatt, featuring YFN Lucci)	2025	—	—	—	—	—	—	—	—	—	—		Non-album single
"Try to Love"	2025	— (Note: "Try to Love" did not enter the Billboard Hot 100, but peaked at number 22 on the Bubbling Under Hot 100 chart.)	27	19	—	—	—	—	—	—	—		The Leaks
"Otha Boy"	2025	—	—	—	—	—	—	—	—	—	—		The Leaks
"Real Shit"	2025	—	30	22	—	—	—	—	—	—	—		The Leaks
"Middle of the Summer"	2025	—	33	—	—	—	—	—	—	—	—		The Leaks
"One of Them Ones" (with Veeze and Rylo Rodriguez)	2026	—	50	—	—	—	—	—	—	—	—		Non-album single
"One of Them" (with DJ Khaled and Future)	2026	70	17	11	—	—	—	—	—	—	—		Aalam of God
"Alicia" (with Hotboii)	2026	—	—	—	—	—	—	—	—	—	—		Non-album singles
"Dead Fresh"	2026	18	2	1	—	27	—	—	—	84	54		Non-album singles
"—" denotes a recording that did not chart or was not released in that territory.

=== As featured artist ===
List of singles as a featured artist, with selected chart positions, showing year released and album name
Title	Year	Peak chart positions										Certifications	Album
Title	Year	US	US R&B/HH	US Rap	AUS	CAN	FRA	IRE	NZ	UK	WW	Certifications	Album
"Check" (Chief featuring Lil Baby)	2017	—	—	—	—	—	—	—	—	—	—		Non-album single
"Lil Cali & Pakistan" (Ralo featuring Lil Baby)	2017	—	—	—	—	—	—	—	—	—	—		Plugged in with the Cartel
"Usain Bolt" (David Pablo featuring Lil Baby, Kash Doll, and Trap Frost)	2017	—	—	—	—	—	—	—	—	—	—		Hood Hero
"Kilo (Remix)" (Scotty Music featuring Lil Baby)	2017	—	—	—	—	—	—	—	—	—	—		Non-album singles
"Got It Right" (PopaBand featuring Lil Baby)	2017	—	—	—	—	—	—	—	—	—	—		Non-album singles
"Shit Together (Remix)" (Jayway Sosa featuring Lil Baby)	2017	—	—	—	—	—	—	—	—	—	—		GodSpeed Reloaded
"Change" (Lou Kane featuring Lil Baby)	2018	—	—	—	—	—	—	—	—	—	—		Non-album single
"I Remember" (Quando Rondo featuring Lil Baby)	2018	—	—	—	—	—	—	—	—	—	—	RIAA: Platinum	Life B4 Fame
"Fake Love" (1K featuring Lil Baby)	2018	—	—	—	—	—	—	—	—	—	—		Non-album singles
"Thug Life" (Youngstar BBG featuring Lil Baby)	2018	—	—	—	—	—	—	—	—	—	—		Non-album singles
"Dope Boyz" (HG Nya Banx featuring Lil Baby)	2018	—	—	—	—	—	—	—	—	—	—		Non-album singles
"Sold Out Dates" (Gunna featuring Lil Baby)	2018	— (Note: "Sold Out Dates" did not enter the Billboard Hot 100, but peaked at number four on the Bubbling Under Hot 100 Singles chart.)	— (Note: "Sold Out Dates" did not enter the Billboard Hot R&B/Hip-Hop Songs chart, but peaked at number three on the Bubbling Under R&B/Hip-Hop Singles chart.)	—	—	—	—	—	—	—	—	RIAA: Platinum; RMNZ: Gold	Non-album singles
"Gossip" (Yogii featuring Lil Baby, Marlo, and Bigga Rankin)	2018	—	—	—	—	—	—	—	—	—	—		Picasso
"Trap House" (Riff 3x featuring Lil Baby)	2018	—	—	—	—	—	—	—	—	—	—		Trap Melodies
"Downfall" (Lil Durk featuring Young Dolph and Lil Baby)	2018	—	—	—	—	—	—	—	—	—	—	RIAA: Gold	Signed to the Streets 3
"Rapper & Trapper" (Lil Bam featuring Lil Baby)	2018	—	—	—	—	—	—	—	—	—	—		Hardhead
"Lil Bebe (Remix)" (DaniLeigh featuring Lil Baby)	2018	—	—	—	—	—	—	—	—	—	—		The Plan
"Alley Oop" (Yung Gravy featuring Lil Baby)	2018	—	—	—	—	—	—	—	—	—	—	RIAA: Gold	Sensational
"Put a Date on It" (Yo Gotti featuring Lil Baby)	2019	46	21	20	—	—	—	—	—	—	—	RIAA: 2× Platinum	Untrapped
"Trap" (Saint Jhn featuring Lil Baby)	2019	—	—	—	—	—	—	—	—	—	—	RIAA: Gold	Ghetto Lenny′s Love Songs
"Decline" (Lil Tjay featuring Lil Baby)	2019	—	—	—	—	—	—	—	—	—	—	RIAA: Gold	True 2 Myself
"You Stay" (DJ Khaled featuring Meek Mill, J Balvin, Lil Baby, and Jeremih)	2019	44	19	—	—	63	—	—	—	—	—	RIAA: Platinum	Father of Asahd
"Leave Em Alone" (Layton Greene and Lil Baby featuring City Girls and PnB Rock)	2019	60	27	5	—	—	—	—	—	—	—	RIAA: Platinum; BPI: Silver; RMNZ: Platinum	Control the Streets, Volume 2
"Nookie" (D-Block Europe featuring Lil Baby)	2019	—	—	—	—	—	—	—	—	16	—	BPI: Silver	PTSD
"Your Peace" (Jacquees featuring Lil Baby)	2019	—	— (Note: Your Peace" did not enter the Hot R&B/Hip-Hop Songs chart, but peaked at number seven on the Bubbling Under R&B/Hip-Hop Singles chart.)	—	—	—	—	—	—	—	—	RIAA: Platinum	King of R&B
"Tootsies" (Gucci Mane featuring Lil Baby)	2019	—	—	—	—	—	—	—	—	—	—		Woptober II
"Down Like That" (KSI featuring Rick Ross, Lil Baby, and S-X)	2019	—	—	—	—	77	—	26	— (Note: "Down Like That" did not chart on the NZ Top 40 Singles chart, but did peak at number 10 on the NZ Hot Singles chart.)	10	—	BPI: Silver	Dissimulation
"Mac 10" (Trippie Redd featuring Lil Baby and Lil Duke)	2019	64	24	—	—	93	—	—	—	—	—	RIAA: Platinum	!
"Back On" (Quality Control featuring Lil Baby)	2019	—	—	—	—	—	—	—	—	—	—		Control the Streets, Volume 2
"Drip Like Dis" (Bankroll Freddie featuring Young Dolph and Lil Baby)	2019	—	— (Note: "Drip Like Dis" did not enter the Hot R&B/Hip-Hop Songs chart but peaked at number 23 on the Mainstream R&B/Hip-Hop Airplay chart.)	—	—	—	—	—	—	—	—	RIAA: Gold	From Trap to Rap
"On the Road" (Post Malone featuring Meek Mill and Lil Baby)	2019	22	13	11	35	22	—	—	—	— (Note: "On the Road" did not enter the UK Singles Chart, as chart rules only allow three songs per artist to chart within the top one hundred at a time, but peaked at number 37 on the UK Streaming Chart.)	—	RIAA: Platinum; ARIA: Platinum; BPI: Silver; MC: 2× Platinum; RMNZ: Gold	Hollywood's Bleeding
"Highest in the Room (Remix)" (Travis Scott featuring Rosalía and Lil Baby)	2019	—	—	—	—	—	—	—	— (Note: "Highest in the Room (Remix)" did not chart on the NZ Top 40 Singles chart, but did peak at number 9 on the NZ Hot Singles chart.)	—	—		JackBoys
"U Played" (Moneybagg Yo featuring Lil Baby)	2020	53	23	18	—	—	—	—	—	—	—	RIAA: 2× Platinum	Time Served
"I Do It" (Lil Wayne featuring Big Sean and Lil Baby)	2020	33	16	12	—	63	—	—	— (Note: "I Do It" did not chart on the NZ Top 40 Singles chart, but did peak at number 14 on the NZ Hot Singles chart.)	—	—		Funeral
"Life Is Good (Remix)" (Future featuring Drake, DaBaby, and Lil Baby)	2020	—	—	—	—	—	—	—	— (Note: "Life Is Good (Remix)" did not chart on the NZ Top 40 Singles chart, but did peak at number 20 on the NZ Hot Singles chart.)	—	—		High Off Life
"3 Headed Goat" (Lil Durk featuring Lil Baby and Polo G)	2020	43	15	—	—	77	—	—	— (Note: "3 Headed Goat" did not chart on the NZ Top 40 Singles chart, but did peak at number 38 on the NZ Hot Singles chart.)	—	—	RIAA: 4× Platinum; BPI: Silver; RMNZ: Gold	Just Cause Y'all Waited 2
"Be Something" (Polo G featuring Lil Baby)	2020	57	23	—	—	90	—	—	—	—	—	RIAA: 2× Platinum	The Goat
"Prospect" (Iann Dior featuring Lil Baby)	2020	— (Note: "Prospect" did not enter the Billboard Hot 100, but peaked at number eight on the Bubbling Under Hot 100 Singles chart.)	50	—	—	—	—	—	— (Note: "Prospect" did not chart on the NZ Top 40 Singles chart, but did peak at number 27 on the NZ Hot Singles chart.)	—	—	RIAA: Platinum; MC: Platinum	I'm Gone
"Both Sides" (Gucci Mane featuring Lil Baby)	2020	—	—	—	—	—	—	—	—	—	—		So Icy Summer
"One Shot" (YoungBoy Never Broke Again featuring Lil Baby)	2020	94	43	—	—	—	—	—	—	—	—	RIAA: Gold	Road to Fast 9
"Know My Rights" (6lack featuring Lil Baby)	2020	75	33	—	—	82	—	—	— (Note: "Know My Rights" did not chart on the NZ Top 40 Singles chart, but did peak at number nine on the NZ Hot Singles chart.)	—	—		6pc Hot EP
"Back at It" (Lil Mosey featuring Lil Baby)	2020	— (Note: "Back at It" did not enter the Billboard Hot 100, but peaked at number nine on the Bubbling Under Hot 100 Singles chart.)	—	—	—	—	—	—	— (Note: "Back at It" did not enter the NZ Top 40 Singles Chart, but peaked at number 19 on the NZ Hot Singles chart.)	—	—		Certified Hitmaker (Deluxe)
"Always n Forever" (Mariah the Scientist featuring Lil Baby)	2020	—	—	—	—	—	—	—	—	—	—	RIAA: Platinum	TBA
"Narrow Road" (NLE Choppa featuring Lil Baby)	2020	— (Note: "Narrow Road" did not enter the Billboard Hot 100, but peaked at number four on the Bubbling Under Hot 100 Singles chart.)	46	—	—	—	—	—	—	—	—	RIAA: Platinum; MC: Gold	Top Shotta
"She Know" (Lil Keed featuring Lil Baby)	2020	—	—	—	—	—	—	—	—	—	—		Trapped on Cleveland 3
"No Chill" (Moneybagg Yo featuring Lil Baby and Rylo Rodriguez)	2020	—	—	—	—	—	—	—	—	—	—	RIAA: Gold	Time Served
"Monday to Sunday" (Pooh Shiesty featuring Lil Baby and Big30)	2020	—	—	—	—	—	—	—	—	—	—	RIAA: Platinum	So Icy Summer
"24 (Remix)" (Money Man featuring Lil Baby)	2020	49	17	16	—	45	—	—	—	—	—	RIAA: 3× Platinum	Epidemic (Deluxe)
"Don't Need Time (Remix)" (Hotboii featuring Lil Baby)	2020	—	—	—	—	—	—	—	—	—	—		Non-album singles
"Why Do You Lie to Me" (Topic and A7S featuring Lil Baby)	2020	—	—	—	—	—	—	—	—	—	—		Non-album singles
"For the Night" (Pop Smoke featuring Lil Baby and DaBaby)	2020	6	4	2	13	7	31	14	9	14	7	RIAA: 8× Platinum; ARIA: 2× Platinum; BPI: Platinum; SNEP: Diamond; RMNZ: 4× Platinum; GLF: Platinum	Shoot for the Stars, Aim for the Moon
"Pardon" (T.I. featuring Lil Baby)	2020	97	40	—	—	—	—	—	—	—	—	RIAA: Gold	The L.I.B.R.A.
"I Met Tay Keith First" (Blac Youngsta featuring Lil Baby and Moneybagg Yo)	2020	—	—	—	—	—	—	—	—	—	—		Fuck Everybody 3
"Ugly" (Russ featuring Lil Baby)	2021	— (Note: "Ugly" did not enter the Billboard Hot 100, but peaked at number 18 on the Bubbling Under Hot 100 Singles chart.)	49	—	—	—	—	—	—	—	—		Non-album single
"Spend It" (Juicy J featuring Lil Baby and 2 Chainz)	2021	—	—	—	—	—	—	—	—	—	—		The Hustle Continues
"Every Chance I Get" (DJ Khaled featuring Lil Baby and Lil Durk)	2021	20	10	2	—	25	—	—	— (Note: "Every Chance I Get" did not enter the NZ Top 40 Singles Chart, but peaked at number fourteen on the NZ Hot Singles Chart.)	73	27	RIAA: 6× Platinum; BPI: Silver; RMNZ: Gold	Khaled Khaled
"I Did It" (DJ Khaled featuring Post Malone, Megan Thee Stallion, Lil Baby, and DaBaby)	2021	43	17	14	99	22	—	48	— (Note: "I Did It" did not enter the NZ Top 40 Singles Chart, but peaked at number seven on the NZ Hot Singles Chart.)	53	33	RIAA: Gold	Khaled Khaled
"Sacrifice" (Lil Zack featuring Lil Baby)	2021	—	—	—	—	—	—	—	—	—	—		Non-album singles
"Whole Lotta Ice" (BigWalkDog featuring Lil Baby and Pooh Shiesty)	2021	—	—	—	—	—	—	—	—	—	—		Non-album singles
"Sharing Locations" (Meek Mill featuring Lil Baby and Lil Durk)	2021	22	12	5	—	36	—	—	— (Note: "Sharing Locations" did not enter the NZ Top 40 Singles Chart, but peaked at number 18 on the NZ Hot Singles Chart.)	92	42	RIAA: Platinum	Expensive Pain
"Know the Difference" (Icewear Vezzo featuring Lil Baby)	2021	—	—	—	—	—	—	—	—	—	—		Non-album single
"Body in Motion" (DJ Khaled featuring Bryson Tiller, Lil Baby, and Roddy Ricch)	2021	79	33	—	—	66	—	—	— (Note: "Body in Motion" did not enter the NZ Top 40 Singles Chart, but peaked at number sixteen on the NZ Hot Singles Chart.)	—	96	RIAA: Gold	Khaled Khaled
"Hurricane" (Kanye West and the Weeknd featuring Lil Baby)	2021	6	1	1	4	4	41	7	3	7	5	RIAA: 2× Platinum; MC: Platinum; BPI: Silver	Donda
"Rich All My Life" (Tay-B featuring Lil Baby)	2021	—	—	—	—	—	—	—	—	—	—		Non-album singles
"Find a Way" (H.E.R. featuring Lil Baby and Lil Durk)	2021	—	— (Note: "Find a Way" did not enter the Hot R&B/Hip-Hop Songs chart but peaked at number 24 on the Mainstream R&B/Hip-Hop Airplay chart.)	—	—	—	—	—	— (Note: "Find a Way" did not enter the NZ Top 40 Singles Chart, but peaked at number 37 on the NZ Hot Singles Chart.)	—	—		Non-album singles
"Girls Want Girls" (Drake featuring Lil Baby)	2021	2	2	2	2	8	12	3	2	2	3	ARIA: 2× Platinum; BPI: Platinum; RMNZ: Platinum	Certified Lover Boy
"Me or Sum" (Nardo Wick featuring Future and Lil Baby)	2021	58	15	10	—	—	—	—	—	—	—	RIAA: 2× Platinum	Who Is Nardo Wick?
"M&M" (Rvssian and Future featuring Lil Baby)	2021	—	—	—	—	—	—	—	—	—	—		Non-album singles
"Ziki Ziki" (Static & Ben El and Snoop Dogg featuring Lil Baby)	2022	—	—	—	—	—	—	—	—	—	—		Non-album singles
"2step" (Ed Sheeran featuring Lil Baby)	2022	48	—	—	40	21	35	9	— (Note: "2step" did not enter the NZ Top 40 Singles Chart, but peaked at number four on the NZ Hot Singles Chart.)	9	33	MC: 2× Platinum; BPI: Platinum; SNEP: Platinum; GLF: Platinum	=
"Sleazy Flow (Remix)" (SleazyWorld Go featuring Lil Baby)	2022	47	9	9	—	98	—	—	— (Note: "Sleazy Flow (Remix)" did not enter the NZ Top 40 Singles Chart, but peaked at number 35 on the NZ Hot Singles Chart.)	—	139	RIAA: 2× Platinum; MC: Gold	Where the Shooters Be
"All Dz Chainz" (Gucci Mane featuring Lil Baby)	2022	— (Note: "All Dz Chainz" did not enter the Billboard Hot 100, but peaked at number 19 on the Bubbling Under Hot 100 Singles chart.)	—	—	—	—	—	—	—	—	—		So Icy Boyz 22
"Staying Alive" (DJ Khaled featuring Drake and Lil Baby)	2022	5	3	1	16	3	—	11	19	21	10	RIAA: Platinum; MC: Platinum; RMNZ: Gold	God Did
"Big Time" (DJ Khaled featuring Future and Lil Baby)	2022	31	11	9	—	50	—	—	—	—	62		God Did
"Hot Boy" (Nardo Wick featuring Lil Baby)	2023	99	31	20	—	—	—	—	—	—	—		Wick
"Bluffin" (Gucci Mane featuring Lil Baby)	2023	100	40	—	—	—	—	—	—	—	—		Breath of Fresh Air
"Forever" (Ciara featuring Lil Baby)	2023	—	21	—	—	—	—	—	—	—	—		CiCi
"PJ" (BossMan Dlow featuring Lil Baby)	2024	86	28	—	—	—	—	—	—	—	—	RIAA: Gold	Dlow Curry
"Tuition" (Remix) (Don Toliver featuring Lil Baby)	2026	—	—	—	—	—	—	—	—	—	—		Non-album single
"Ball My Love" (Quavo featuring Lil Baby)	2026	—	—	—	—	—	—	—	—	—	—		Qrömelife
"—" denotes a recording that did not chart or was not released in that territory.

== Other charted and certified songs ==
List of other charted or certified songs, with selected chart positions, showing year released and album name
Title	Year	Peak chart positions										Certifications	Album
Title	Year	US	US R&B/HH	US Rap	AUS	CAN	FRA	IRE	NZ	UK	WW	Certifications	Album
"To The Top"	2017	—	—	—	—	—	—	—	—	—	—	RIAA: Gold	Too Hard
"Mickey" (Lil Yachty featuring Offset and Lil Baby)	2018	— (Note: "Mickey" did not enter the Billboard Hot 100, but peaked at number seven on the Bubbling Under Hot 100 Singles chart.)	— (Note: "Mickey" did not enter the Hot R&B/Hip-Hop Songs chart, but peaked at number two on the Bubbling Under R&B/Hip-Hop Singles chart.)	79	—	—	—	—	—	—	—	RIAA: Gold	Lil Boat 2
"How I Know" (Lil Durk featuring Lil Baby)	2018	—	—	—	—	—	—	—	—	—	—	RIAA: Gold	Just Cause Y'all Waited
"Leaked"	2018	—	—	—	—	—	—	—	—	—	—	RIAA: Gold	Harder Than Ever
"Cash"	2018	—	—	—	—	—	—	—	—	—	—	RIAA: Gold	Harder Than Ever
"First Class"	2018	—	—	—	—	—	—	—	—	—	—	RIAA: Gold	Harder Than Ever
"Life Goes On" (featuring Gunna and Lil Uzi Vert)	2018	74	36	—	—	—	—	—	—	—	—	RIAA: 2× Platinum; BPI: Silver; MC: Platinum; RMNZ: Platinum	Harder Than Ever
"Never Needed No Help"	2018	—	—	—	—	—	—	—	—	—	—	RIAA: Gold	Harder Than Ever
"Chanel (Go Get It)" (Young Thug featuring Gunna and Lil Baby)	2018	78	31	25	—	92	—	—	—	—	—	RIAA: Platinum; BPI: Silver; MC: Platinum; RMNZ: Gold	Slime Language
"Off White Vlone" (with Gunna featuring Lil Durk and Nav)	2018	54	25	23	—	52	—	—	— (Note: "Off White Vlone" did not chart on the NZ Top 40 Singles chart, but did peak at number 36 on the NZ Hot Singles chart.)	—	—	RIAA: Gold; MC: Gold	Drip Harder
"Business Is Business" (with Gunna)	2018	61	28	—	—	69	—	—	—	—	—	RIAA: Gold	Drip Harder
"Belly" (with Gunna)	2018	80	37	—	—	92	—	—	—	—	—		Drip Harder
"Deep End"	2018	97	45	—	—	—	—	—	—	—	—	RIAA: Gold	Drip Harder
"Underdog" (with Gunna)	2018	— (Note: "Underdog" did not enter the Billboard Hot 100, but peaked at number two on the Bubbling Under Hot 100 Singles chart.)	— (Note: "Underdog" did not enter the Billboard Hot R&B/Hip-Hop Songs chart, but peaked at number one on the Bubbling Under R&B/Hip-Hop Singles chart.)	—	—	—	—	—	—	—	—		Drip Harder
"I Am" (with Gunna)	2018	98	46	—	—	—	—	—	—	—	—	RIAA: Gold	Drip Harder
"Seals Pills" (with Gunna)	2018	— (Note: "Seals Pills" did not enter the Billboard Hot 100, but peaked at number 13 on the Bubbling Under Hot 100 Singles chart.)	— (Note: "Seals Pills" did not enter the Billboard Hot R&B/Hip-Hop Songs chart, but peaked at number five on the Bubbling Under R&B/Hip-Hop Singles chart.)	—	—	—	—	—	—	—	—		Drip Harder
"My Jeans" (with Gunna featuring Young Thug)	2018	— (Note: "My Jeans" did not enter the Billboard Hot 100, but peaked at number four on the Bubbling Under Hot 100 Singles chart.)	— (Note: "My Jeans" did not enter the Billboard Hot R&B/Hip-Hop Songs chart, but peaked at number two on the Bubbling Under R&B/Hip-Hop Singles chart.)	—	—	—	—	—	—	—	—		Drip Harder
"Never Recover" (with Gunna and Drake)	2018	15	9	9	—	16	—	89	— (Note: "Never Recover" did not chart on the NZ Top 40 Singles chart, but did peak at number 13 on the NZ Hot Singles chart.)	46	—	RIAA: 2× Platinum; BPI: Silver; MC: Platinum; RMNZ: Gold	Drip Harder
"Global"	2018	91	—	—	—	—	—	—	—	—	—	RIAA: Platinum	Street Gossip
"Pure Cocaine"	2018	46	20	19	—	56	—	—	—	—	—	RIAA: 4× Platinum; BPI: Gold; MC: Platinum; RMNZ: 2× Platinum	Street Gossip
"Crush a Lot"	2018	82	46	—	—	—	—	—	—	—	—	RIAA: Gold	Street Gossip
"Time" (featuring Meek Mill)	2018	62	31	—	—	—	—	—	—	—	—	RIAA: Platinum	Street Gossip
"Ready" (featuring Gunna)	2018	66	35	—	—	—	—	—	—	—	—	RIAA: 2× Platinum; BPI: Silver; RMNZ: Gold	Street Gossip
"Word on the Street"	2018	98	—	—	—	—	—	—	—	—	—	RIAA: Gold	Street Gossip
"This Week"	2018	— (Note: "This Week" did not enter the Billboard Hot 100, but peaked at number three on the Bubbling Under Hot 100 Singles chart.)	—	—	—	—	—	—	—	—	—	RIAA: Gold	Street Gossip
"Anyway" (featuring 2 Chainz & Gucci Mane)	2018	—	—	—	—	—	—	—	—	—	—	RIAA: Gold	Street Gossip
"No Friends" (featuring Rylo Rodriguez)	2018	— (Note: "No Friends" did not enter the Billboard Hot 100, but peaked at number 17 on the Bubbling Under Hot 100 Singles chart.)	—	—	—	—	—	—	—	—	—	RIAA: Gold	Street Gossip
"Realist In It" (featuring Gucci Mane & Offset)	2018	—	—	—	—	—	—	—	—	—	—	RIAA: Gold	Street Gossip
"Dreams 2 Reality" (featuring NoCap)	2018	—	—	—	—	—	—	—	—	—	—	RIAA: Gold	Street Gossip
"Can't Leave Without It" (21 Savage featuring Gunna and Lil Baby)	2018	58	18	16	—	70	—	—	— (Note: "Can't Leave Without It" did not chart on the NZ Top 40 Singles chart, but did peak at number 12 on the NZ Hot Singles chart.)	—	—	RIAA: Platinum; MC: Gold	I Am > I Was
"Cross Me" (YoungBoy Never Broke Again featuring Lil Baby and Plies)	2018	— (Note: "Cross Me" did not chart on the Billboard Hot 100, but peaked at number 22 on the Bubbling Under Hot 100 Singles chart.)	—	—	—	—	—	—	—	—	—	RIAA: Platinum	Realer
"Derek Fisher" (Gunna featuring Lil Baby)	2019	— (Note: "Derek Fisher" did not enter the Billboard Hot 100, but peaked at number five on the Bubbling Under Hot 100 Singles chart.)	—	—	—	—	—	—	—	—	—		Drip or Drown 2
"Bad Bad Bad" (Young Thug featuring Lil Baby)	2019	32	15	13	—	47	—	—	— (Note: "Bad Bad Bad" did not chart on the NZ Top 40 Singles chart, but did peak at number six on the NZ Hot Singles chart.)	72	—	RIAA: Platinum; RMNZ: Gold	So Much Fun
"Toes" (DaBaby featuring Lil Baby and Moneybagg Yo)	2019	28	16	14	—	40	—	63	— (Note: "Toes" did not chart on the NZ Top 40 Singles chart, but did peak at number 17 on the NZ Hot Singles chart.)	—	—	RIAA: 2× Platinum; RMNZ: Platinum	Kirk
"How I Move" (Flipp Dinero featuring Lil Baby)	2019	— (Note: "How I Move" did not enter the Billboard Hot 100, but peaked at number 6 on the Bubbling Under Hot 100 Singles chart.)	—	—	—	—	—	—	—	—	—	RIAA: Platinum; RMNZ: Gold	Love for Guala
"Get Ugly"	2020	54	26	21	—	—	—	—	—	—	—	RIAA: Gold	My Turn
"Heatin Up" (with Gunna)	2020	18	10	6	—	36	—	88	— (Note: "Heatin Up" did not chart on the NZ Top 40 Singles chart, but did peak at number eight on the NZ Hot Singles chart.)	66	—	RIAA: Platinum	My Turn
"How"	2020	59	31	24	—	—	—	—	—	—	—	RIAA: Gold	My Turn
"Grace" (with 42 Dugg)	2020	48	23	18	—	—	—	—	—	—	—	RIAA: 2× Platinum	My Turn
"Live Off My Closet" (featuring Future)	2020	28	15	11	—	63	—	—	— (Note: "Live Off My Closet" did not chart on the NZ Top 40 Singles chart, but did peak at number 17 on the NZ Hot Singles chart.)	—	—	RIAA: Gold	My Turn
"Same Thing"	2020	78	40	—	—	—	—	—	—	—	—	RIAA: Gold	My Turn
"Commercial" (featuring Lil Uzi Vert)	2020	23	12	8	—	59	—	—	— (Note: "Commercial" did not chart on the NZ Top 40 Singles chart, but did peak at number 15 on the NZ Hot Singles chart.)	—	—	RIAA: Platinum	My Turn
"Forever" (featuring Lil Wayne)	2020	64	34	—	—	—	—	—	—	—	—	RIAA: Gold	My Turn
"Can't Explain"	2020	99	46	—	—	—	—	—	—	—	—	RIAA: Gold	My Turn
"No Sucker" (with Moneybagg Yo)	2020	58	30	23	—	—	—	—	—	—	—	RIAA: Platinum	My Turn
"We Should" (with Young Thug)	2020	91	43	—	—	—	—	—	—	—	—	RIAA: Gold	My Turn
"Catch the Sun"	2020	— (Note: "Catch the Sun" did not enter the Billboard Hot 100, but peaked at number two on the Bubbling Under Hot 100 Singles chart.)	49	—	—	—	—	—	—	—	—	RIAA: Platinum	My Turn
"Consistent"	2020	— (Note: "Consistent" did not enter the Billboard Hot 100, but peaked at number three on the Bubbling Under Hot 100 Singles chart.)	—	—	—	—	—	—	—	—	—	RIAA: Gold	My Turn
"Gang Signs"	2020	— (Note: "Gang Signs" did not enter the Billboard Hot 100, but peaked at number 13 on the Bubbling Under Hot 100 Singles chart.)	—	—	—	—	—	—	—	—	—		My Turn
"Hurtin"	2020	— (Note: "Hurtin" did not enter the Billboard Hot 100, but peaked at number 15 on the Bubbling Under Hot 100 Singles chart.)	—	—	—	—	—	—	—	—	—		My Turn
"Forget That" (with Rylo Rodriguez)	2020	— (Note: "Forget That" did not enter the Billboard Hot 100, but peaked at number 11 on the Bubbling Under Hot 100 Singles chart.)	—	—	—	—	—	—	—	—	—	RIAA: Gold	My Turn
"Solid"	2020	— (Note: "Solid" did not enter the Billboard Hot 100, but peaked at number 14 on the Bubbling Under Hot 100 Singles chart.)	—	—	—	—	—	—	—	—	—	RIAA: Gold	My Turn
"Social Distancing"	2020	65	34	—	—	—	—	—	—	—	—	RIAA: Gold	My Turn
"Low Down"	2020	50	15	7	—	58	—	—	—	—	130	RIAA: Platinum; BPI: Silver; RMNZ: Gold	My Turn
"Humble"	2020	86	43	—	—	—	—	—	—	—	—	RIAA: Gold	My Turn
"Get Money"	2020	— (Note: "Get Money" did not enter the Billboard Hot 100, but peaked at number three on the Bubbling Under Hot 100 Singles chart.)	—	—	—	—	—	—	—	—	—	RIAA: Gold	My Turn
"We Paid" (with 42 Dugg)	2020	10	8	5	—	42	—	80	— (Note: "We Paid" did not chart on the NZ Top 40 Singles chart, but did peak at number 31 on the NZ Hot Singles chart.)	89	93	RIAA: 7× Platinum; BPI: Silver; RMNZ: Gold	My Turn
"Blindfold" (Gunna featuring Lil Baby)	2020	59	26	23	—	86	—	—	—	—	—	RIAA: Gold	Wunna
"Don't Need Friends" (Nav featuring Lil Baby)	2020	65	21	20	—	46	—	—	— (Note: "Don't Need Friends" did not chart on the NZ Top 40 Singles chart, but did peak at number 33 on the NZ Hot Singles chart.)	—	105	MC: Gold	Emergency Tsunami
"Face of My City" (Jack Harlow featuring Lil Baby)	2020	— (Note: "Face of My City" did not enter the Billboard Hot 100, but peaked at number 7 on the Bubbling Under Hot 100 Singles chart.)	43	—	—	93	—	—	— (Note: "Face My City" did not chart on the NZ Top 40 Singles chart, but did peak at number 15 on the NZ Hot Singles chart.)	—	—		Thats What They All Say
"Finesse Out the Gang Way" (Lil Durk featuring Lil Baby)	2021	39	15	11	—	65	—	—	— (Note: "Finesse Out the Gang Way" did not chart on the NZ Top 40 Singles chart, but did peak at number 22 on the NZ Hot Singles chart.)	—	56	RIAA: Platinum	The Voice (Deluxe)
"Wants and Needs" (Drake featuring Lil Baby)	2021	2	2	2	15	2	115	8	20	10	2	RIAA: 5× Platinum; ARIA: 2× Platinum; BPI: Gold; RMNZ: Platinum	Scary Hours 2
"Paid the Fine" (YSL Records, Young Thug, and Gunna featuring Lil Baby and YTB Trench)	2021	77	32	—	—	93	—	—	—	—	104		Slime Language 2
"Pride Is the Devil" (with J. Cole)	2021	7	5	3	15	10	—	—	8	15	9	RIAA: 2× Platinum; BPI: Silver; RMNZ: Platinum	The Off-Season
"Welcome to the Riches" (Pooh Shiesty featuring Lil Baby)	2021	— (Note: "Welcome to the Riches" did not enter the Billboard Hot 100, but peaked at number 14 on the Bubbling Under Hot 100 Singles chart.)	—	—	—	—	—	—	—	—	—		Shiesty Season - Spring Deluxe
"2040" (with Lil Durk)	2021	31	12	10	—	58	—	—	— (Note: "2040" did not chart on the NZ Top 40 Singles chart, but did peak at number 22 on the NZ Hot Singles chart.)	—	50	RIAA: Gold	The Voice of the Heroes
"Hats Off" (with Lil Durk and Travis Scott)	2021	16	5	3	—	27	—	78	— (Note: "Hats Off" did not chart on the NZ Top 40 Singles chart, but did peak at number six on the NZ Hot Singles chart.)	63	23	RIAA: Platinum	The Voice of the Heroes
"Who I Want" (with Lil Durk)	2021	46	20	17	—	67	—	—	— (Note: "Who I Want" did not chart on the NZ Top 40 Singles chart, but did peak at number 20 on the NZ Hot Singles chart.)	83	56	RIAA: Gold	The Voice of the Heroes
"Still Hood" (with Lil Durk)	2021	56	23	20	—	—	—	—	—	—	82		The Voice of the Heroes
"Man of My Word" (with Lil Durk)	2021	60	25	22	—	—	—	—	—	—	93	RIAA: Gold	The Voice of the Heroes
"Still Runnin" (with Lil Durk and Meek Mill)	2021	43	18	16	—	70	—	—	—	—	60	RIAA: Gold	The Voice of the Heroes
"Medical" (with Lil Durk)	2021	67	28	25	—	—	—	—	—	—	107		The Voice of the Heroes
"How It Feels" (with Lil Durk)	2021	34	14	12	—	77	—	—	—	—	59	RIAA: Platinum	The Voice of the Heroes
"Lying" (with Lil Durk)	2021	70	30	—	—	—	—	—	—	—	117		The Voice of the Heroes
"Okay" (with Lil Durk)	2021	58	24	21	—	—	—	—	—	—	96	RIAA: Gold	The Voice of the Heroes
"That's Facts" (with Lil Durk)	2021	73	32	—	—	—	—	—	—	—	122		The Voice of the Heroes
"Please" (with Lil Durk)	2021	79	34	—	—	—	—	—	—	—	138		The Voice of the Heroes
"Up the Side" (with Lil Durk and Young Thug)	2021	80	35	—	—	—	—	—	—	—	128		The Voice of the Heroes
"If You Want To" (with Lil Durk)	2021	99	44	—	—	—	—	—	—	—	192		The Voice of the Heroes
"Rich Off Pain" (with Lil Durk and Rod Wave)	2021	68	29	—	—	—	—	—	—	—	118	RIAA: Gold	The Voice of the Heroes
"Make It Out" (with Lil Durk)	2021	— (Note: "Make It Out" did not enter the Billboard Hot 100, but peaked at number six on the Bubbling Under Hot 100 chart.)	50	—	—	—	—	—	—	—	—		The Voice of the Heroes
"Bruised Up" (with Lil Durk)	2021	— (Note: "Bruised Up" did not enter the Billboard Hot 100, but peaked at number four on the Bubbling Under Hot 100 chart.)	48	—	—	—	—	—	—	—	—		The Voice of the Heroes
"5500 Degrees" (EST Gee featuring Lil Baby, 42 Dugg, and Rylo Rodriguez)	2021	92	34	—	—	—	—	—	—	—	—	RIAA: Platinum	Bigger Than Life or Death
"Take Kare" (YNW Melly featuring Lil Baby and Lil Durk)	2021	— (Note: "Take Kare" did not enter the Billboard Hot 100, but peaked at number 20 on the Bubbling Under Hot 100 chart.)	—	—	—	—	—	—	—	—	—		Just a Matter of Slime
"Don't Play" (Polo G featuring Lil Baby)	2021	66	17	10	—	69	—	—	— (Note: "Don't Play" did not chart on the NZ Top 40 Singles chart, but did peak at number 21 on the NZ Hot Singles chart.)	—	118		Hall of Fame 2.0
"Moved to Miami" (Roddy Ricch featuring Lil Baby)	2021	85	21	13	—	87	—	—	— (Note: "Moved to Miami" did not chart on the NZ Top 40 Singles chart, but did peak at number 24 on the NZ Hot Singles chart.)	—	200		Live Life Fast
"25K Jacket" (Gunna featuring Lil Baby)	2022	28	9	6	—	56	—	—	— (Note: "25k Jacket" did not chart on the NZ Top 40 Singles chart, but did peak at number 14 on the NZ Hot Singles chart.)	47	42	RIAA: Platinum	DS4Ever
"Like Me" (Future featuring 42 Dugg and Lil Baby)	2022	— (Note: "Like Me" did not enter the Billboard Hot 100, but peaked at number 15 on the Bubbling Under Hot 100 chart.)	—	—	—	—	—	—	—	—	—		I Never Liked You
"Addicted" (Chris Brown featuring Lil Baby)	2022	92	28	—	—	—	—	—	—	—	—		Breezy
"Real Spill"	2022	10	5	4	—	32	—	67	— (Note: "Real Spill" did not enter the NZ Top 40 Singles Chart, but peaked at number 12 on the NZ Hot Singles Chart.)	36	21	RIAA: Gold	It's Only Me
"Stand on It"	2022	22	11	10	—	44	—	—	—	—	36	RIAA: Gold	It's Only Me
"Pop Out" (with Nardo Wick)	2022	15	6	6	—	50	—	—	— (Note: "Pop Out" did not enter the NZ Top 40 Singles Chart, but peaked at number 20 on the NZ Hot Singles Chart.)	—	28	RIAA: Gold	It's Only Me
"California Breeze"	2022	4	2	1	—	27	—	—	— (Note: "California Breeze" did not enter the NZ Top 40 Singles Chart, but peaked at number nine on the NZ Hot Singles Chart.)	26	15	RIAA: Platinum; BPI: Silver	It's Only Me
"Perfect Timing"	2022	32	16	14	—	62	—	—	—	—	61		It's Only Me
"Never Hating" (with Young Thug)	2022	19	8	8	—	47	—	—	— (Note: "Never Hating" did not enter the NZ Top 40 Singles Chart, but peaked at number 16 on the NZ Hot Singles Chart.)	—	32	RIAA: Gold	It's Only Me
"Forever" (featuring Fridayy)	2022	8	3	2	—	61	—	80	—	43	23		It's Only Me
"Not Finished"	2022	26	13	12	—	42	—	—	—	—	39	RIAA: Gold	It's Only Me
"Waterfall Flow"	2022	45	21	17	—	88	—	—	—	—	92		It's Only Me
"Everything"	2022	52	22	18	—	90	—	—	—	—	109		It's Only Me
"From Now On" (featuring Future)	2022	42	20	16	—	77	—	—	—	—	75	RIAA: Gold	It's Only Me
"Double Down"	2022	54	24	20	—	79	—	—	—	—	114		It's Only Me
"The World is Yours to Take" (Official Budweiser Anthem of the FIFA World Cup Qatar 2022)	2022	—	—	—	—	—	—	—	—	—	—	FIFA World Cup Qatar 2022 Official Soundtrack	It's Only Me
"Cost to Be Alive" (with Rylo Rodriguez)	2022	57	25	21	—	—	—	—	—	—	132		It's Only Me
"Top Priority"	2022	64	27	24	—	—	—	—	—	—	159		It's Only Me
"Danger"	2022	69	31	—	—	—	—	—	—	—	172		It's Only Me
"Stop Playin" (featuring Jeremih)	2022	81	38	—	—	—	—	—	—	—	—		It's Only Me
"FR"	2022	76	34	—	—	—	—	—	—	—	191		It's Only Me
"Back and Forth" (with EST Gee)	2022	68	30	—	—	—	—	—	—	—	170		It's Only Me
"Shiest Talk" (featuring Pooh Shiesty)	2022	58	26	22	—	—	—	—	—	—	135		It's Only Me
"No Fly Zone"	2022	80	37	—	—	—	—	—	—	—	—		It's Only Me
"Russian Roulette"	2022	70	32	—	—	—	—	—	—	—	175		
"Fully Loaded" (with Trippie Redd and Future)	2023	86	33	17	—	—	—	—	— (Note: "Fully Loaded" did not chart on the NZ Top 40 Singles chart, but did peak at number 22 on the NZ Hot Singles chart.)	—	—		Mansion Musik
"Dark Brotherhood" (with Trippie Redd)	2023	— (Note: "Dark Brotherhood" did not enter the Billboard Hot 100, but peaked at number five on the Bubbling Under Hot 100 chart.)	46	—	—	—	—	—	— (Note: "Dark Brotherhood" did not chart on the NZ Top 40 Singles chart, but did peak at number 32 on the NZ Hot Singles chart.)	—	—		Mansion Musik
"All My Life" (with Future and Metro Boomin)	2024	61	25	22	—	83	—	—	—	—	—		We Still Don't Trust You
"Fuck the Fame" (Rod Wave featuring Lil Baby and Lil Yachty)	2024	50	14	11	—	—	—	—	— (Note: "Fuck the Fame" did not enter the NZ Top 40 Singles Chart, but peaked at number 29 on the NZ Hot Singles Chart.)	—			Last Lap
"Listen Up"	2025	65	16	13	—	—	—	—	—	—	—		WHAM
"Dum, Dumb, and Dumber" (with Young Thug and Future)	2025	16	4	3	—	38	—	—	— (Note: "Dum, Dumb, and Dumber" did not chart on the NZ Top 40 Singles chart, but did peak at number 5 on the NZ Hot Singles Chart.)	46	32		WHAM
"F U 2X"	2025	57	15	12	—	—	—	—	—	—	187		WHAM
"I Promise"	2025	71	17	14	—	—	—	—	—	—	—		WHAM
"Redbone" (featuring GloRilla)	2025	53	14	11	—	—	—	—	—	—	—		WHAM
"By Myself" (with Rylo Rodriguez featuring Rod Wave)	2025	44	10	8	—	—	—	—	— (Note: "By Myself" did not chart on the NZ Top 40 Singles chart, but did peak at number 15 on the NZ Hot Singles Chart.)	—	169		WHAM
"Due 4a Win"	2025	73	18	15	—	—	—	—	—	—	—		WHAM
"Stiff Gang"	2025	86	23	20	—	—	—	—	—	—	—		WHAM
"So Sorry"	2025	74	19	16	—	—	—	—	—	—	—		WHAM
"Stuff" (featuring Travis Scott)	2025	51	13	10	—	56	—	—	— (Note: "Stuff" did not chart on the NZ Top 40 Singles chart, but did peak at number 7 on the NZ Hot Singles Chart.)	82	102		WHAM
"Say Twin"	2025	— (Note: "Say Twin" did not enter the Billboard Hot 100, but peaked at number three on the Bubbling Under Hot 100 chart.)	40	—	—	—	—	—	—	—	—		WHAM
"Free Promo"	2025	99	28	23	—	—	—	—	—	—	—		WHAM
"Outfit" (with 21 Savage)	2025	50	12	9	—	82	—	—	— (Note: "Outfit" did not chart on the NZ Top 40 Singles chart, but did peak at number 8 on the NZ Hot Singles Chart.)	—	153		WHAM
"Drugs Talkin"	2025	— (Note: "Drugs Talkin" did not enter the Billboard Hot 100, but peaked at number two on the Bubbling Under Hot 100 chart.)	39	—	—	—	—	—	—	—	—		WHAM
"Streets Colder"	2025	— (Note: "Streets Colder" did not enter the Billboard Hot 100, but peaked at number one on the Bubbling Under Hot 100 chart.)	34	—	—	—	—	—	—	—	—		WHAM
"99" (with Future)	2025	— (Note: "99" did not enter the Billboard Hot 100, but peaked at number eight on the Bubbling Under Hot 100 chart.)	33	—	—	—	—	—	— (Note: "99" did not chart on the NZ Top 40 Singles chart, but did peak at number 38 on the NZ Hot Singles Chart.)	—	—		WHAM
"Houstatlantaville" (EST Gee featuring Lil Baby and Travis Scott)	2025	— (Note: "Houstatlantaville" did not enter the Billboard Hot 100, but peaked at number 18 on the Bubbling Under Hot 100 chart.)	50	—	—	—	—	—	—	—	—		I Aint Feeling You
"1000 Times" (Lil Durk featuring Lil Baby)	2025	83	23	—	—	—	—	—	—	—	—		Deep Thoughts
"Mrs. Trendsetter"	2025	64	14	9	—	—	—	—	—	—	—		The Leaks
"Guaranteed"	2025	—	29	23	—	—	—	—	—	—	—		The Leaks
"Nasty Girl"	2025	—	47	—	—	—	—	—	—	—	—		The Leaks
"Violation"	2025	—	45	—	—	—	—	—	—	—	—		The Leaks
"Let's Do It" (with Playboi Carti and Skooly)	2025	71	10	6	—	—	—	—	— (Note: "Let's Do It" did not chart on the NZ Top 40 Singles Chart, but did peak at number 12 on the NZ Hot Singles Chart.)	—	—		The Leaks
"What She Like"	2025	— (Note: "What She Like" did not enter the Billboard Hot 100, but peaked at number 18 on the Bubbling Under Hot 100 chart.)	27	20	—	—	—	—	—	—	—		The Leaks
"Get Along" (with Lil Yachty, Lucki and Veeze)	2025	—	38	—	—	—	—	—	—	—	—		The Leaks
"Superman" (with Young Thug)	2025	— (Note: "Superman" did not enter the Billboard Hot 100, but peaked at number 9 on the Bubbling Under Hot 100 chart.)	21	15	—	—	—	—	—	—	—		The Leaks
"Atlanta Tears" (with 21 Savage)	2025	— (Note: "Atlanta Tears" did not enter the Billboard Hot 100, but peaked at number 17 on the Bubbling Under Hot 100 chart.)	35	—	—	—	—	—	—	—	—		What Happened to the Streets?
"Top Uh It"	2026	60	10	6	—	—	—	—	—	—	—		Fresh
"Mr. Do Something"	2026	48	8	5	—	89	—	—	—	—	—		Fresh
"Burnt Shit"	2026	74	17	12	—	—	—	—	—	—	—		Fresh
"Be the One"	2026	89	25	20	—	—	—	—	—	—	—		Fresh
"Ain't Goin"	2026	80	20	15	—	—	—	—	—	—	—		Fresh
"From the Back"	2026	70	15	10	—	—	—	—	—	—	—		Fresh
"All My Partnas" (featuring Future, Young Thug and Rylo Rodriguez)	2026	69	14	9	—	—	—	—	—	—	—		Fresh
"My Side"	2026	— (Note: "My Side" did not enter the Billboard Hot 100, but peaked at number 4 on the Bubbling Under Hot 100 chart.)	32	—	—	—	—	—	—	—	—		Fresh
"Life of the Party (L.O.T.P)"	2026	— (Note: "Life of the Party (L.O.T.P)" did not enter the Billboard Hot 100, but peaked at number 8 on the Bubbling Under Hot 100 chart.)	35	—	—	—	—	—	—	—	—		Fresh
"Your Fault"	2026	98	28	23	—	—	—	—	—	—	—		Fresh
"All Us"	2026	— (Note: "All Us" did not enter the Billboard Hot 100, but peaked at number 12 on the Bubbling Under Hot 100 chart.)	41	—	—	—	—	—	—	—	—		Fresh
"In Your Head" (featuring Rylo Rodriguez)	2026	— (Note: "In Your Head" did not enter the Billboard Hot 100, but peaked at number 2 on the Bubbling Under Hot 100 chart.)	30	24	—	—	—	—	—	—	—		Fresh
"Like a Brat"	2026	— (Note: "Like a Brat" did not enter the Billboard Hot 100, but peaked at number 14 on the Bubbling Under Hot 100 chart.)	43	—	—	—	—	—	—	—	—		Fresh
"Televised"	2026	— (Note: "Televised" did not enter the Billboard Hot 100, but peaked at number 22 on the Bubbling Under Hot 100 chart.)	47	—	—	—	—	—	—	—	—		Fresh
"Rareform"	2026	—	50	—	—	—	—	—	—	—	—		Fresh
"Keep Goin"	2026	—	48	—	—	—	—	—	—	—	—		Fresh
"—" denotes a recording that did not chart or was not released in that territory.

== Guest appearances ==
List of non-single guest appearances, with other performing artists, showing year released and album name
Title	Year	Other artist(s)	Album
"Set Up Shop"	2017	Marlo	—N/a
"Trap Phone"	2017	YBS Skola	Only Hope 2
"Bag After Bag"	2017	Blacc Zacc	High Class Trapper
"Balmains"	2017	Project Youngin	Patience
"Fasho"	2017	Jay5, Yakki	Trap Vibes
"Vision Clear"	2017	Lavish the MDK	Too Hard
"Door Lock"	2017	Marlo, Bite da Don	The Wire
"Dopeboyz of America"	2017	DopeboyRa	DopesellItself
"My Dawg (Remix)"	2017	Kodak Black, Quavo, Moneybagg Yo	Quality Control: Control the Streets Volume 1
"The Load"	2017	Gucci Mane, Marlo	Quality Control: Control the Streets Volume 1
"Hook Up"	2017	Offset	Quality Control: Control the Streets Volume 1
"Candler 2 West End"	2017	Yung Mal, Lil Quill	Came From Zero
"Racks On Des Diamonds"	2018	Hoodrich Pablo Juan	Rich Hood
"Picture Perfect"	2018	Strick	Risk=Reward 2
"No Point"	2018	Kollision	Better Than Yesterday
"Oh Okay"	2018	Gunna, Young Thug	Drip Season 3
"Shoe Box"	2018	Kap G	Real Migo Shit 4
"Pull Up"	2018	Kap G	Real Migo Shit 4
"On My Own"	2018	Kade Fresco	—N/a
"Day in My Hood"	2018	Sherwood Marty	—N/a
"WWYA"	2018	Charlie Heat, G Herbo	—N/a
"One Day"	2018	Ralo	Diary of the Streets 3
"Nervous	2018	Famous Dex, Rich the Kid, Jay Critch	—N/a
"Hoop Dreams"	2018	Yung Bleu, K Camp	Investments 5
"Fwm"	2018	Moneybagg Yo	2 Heartless
"Up One (Remix)"	2018	Yella Beezy	—N/a
"I'm Gettin' Paid"	2018	Lil Duke	Reality Checc
"No Socks"	2018	Paper Lovee	—N/a
"Today (Remix)"	2018	DaBaby	—N/a
"Far Gone"	2018	Ski Mask the Slump God	Stokeley
"Tic Roc"	2018	6ix9ine	Dummy Boy
"FLEXible"	2018	Tory Lanez, Chris Brown	Love Me Now?
"Season"	2018	City Girls	Girl Code
"Can't Leave Without It"	2018	21 Savage, Gunna	I Am > I Was
"Something New"	2019	Adé	Always Something
"Derek Fisher"	2019	Gunna	Drip or Drown 2
"Water"	2019	Schoolboy Q	Crash Talk
"Da Real Hoodbabies" (Remix)	2019	Lil Gotit	—N/a
"Weather the Storm"	2019	DJ Khaled, Meek Mill	Father of Asahd
"You Stay"	2019	DJ Khaled, Meek Mill, J Balvin, Jeremih	Father of Asahd
"On the Road"	2019	Post Malone, Meek Mill	Hollywood's Bleeding
"Decline"	2019	Lil Tjay	True 2 Myself
"Weekend"	2020	Blueface	Find the Beat
"Stuck Together"	2020	Rich the Kid	Boss Man
"Not a Rapper"	2020	42 Dugg, Yo Gotti	Young & Turnt, Vol. 2
"Rags2Riches 2"	2020	Rod Wave	Pray 4 Love
"Drop a Tear"	2020	Bankrol Hayden	Pain is Temporary
"Get Even"	2020	Fredo Bang	Most Hated
"Givenchy Kickin"	2020	Calboy, Lil Tjay	Long Live the Kings
"Don't Need Friends"	2020	Nav	Emergency Tsunami
"Just How I'm Feelin'"	2020	Lil Yachty	Lil Boat 3.5
"Walk"	2020	Rylo Rodriguez, 42 Dugg	G.I.H.F.
"Spend It"	2020	Juicy J, 2 Chainz	The Hustle Continues
"Face of My City"	2020	Jack Harlow	Thats What They All Say
"Sex Lies"	2020	Mulatto	Queen of Da Souf (Extended version)
"Finesse Out the Gang Way"	2021	Lil Durk	The Voice (Deluxe)
"Skittles"	2021	Clever	Crazy
"Paid the Fine"	2021	YSL Records, Young Thug, Gunna, YTB Trench	Slime Language 2
"Mastercard"	2021	Shiva	Dolce Vita
"Welcome to the Riches"	2021	Pooh Shiesty	Shiesty Season - Spring Deluxe
"5500 Degrees"	2021	EST Gee, 42 Dugg, Rylo Rodriguez	Bigger Than Life or Death
"Don't Play"	2021	Polo G	Hall of Fame 2.0
"Take Kare"	2021	YNW Melly, Lil Durk	Just a Matter of Slime
"Moved to Miami"	2021	Roddy Ricch	Live Life Fast
"25k Jacket"	2022	Gunna	DS4Ever
"Kingpen Ghostwriter"	2022	2 Chainz	Dope Don't Sell Itself
"Like Me"	2022	Future, 42 Dugg	I Never Liked You
"What You Sayin"	2022	Lil Kee	Letter 2 My Brother
"Addicted"	2022	Chris Brown	Breezy
"Fully Loaded"	2023	Trippie Redd, Future	Mansion Musik
"Dark Brotherhood"	2023	Trippie Redd	Mansion Musik
"Underdog Song"	2024	Lil Mabu	Young Genius
"All My Life"	2024	Future, Metro Boomin	We Still Don't Trust You
"Forever Rolling"	2024	¥$	Vultures 2
"Fuck the Fame"	2024	Rod Wave, Lil Yachty	Last Lap
"Momma Don't Worry"	2025	Lil Wayne, Future	Tha Carter VI (Bonus)
"Atlanta Tears"	2025	21 Savage	What Happened to the Streets?
"Spend Dat" (Remix)	2026	Yung Miami, Kodak Black	—N/a
"Club Outside"	2026	YSL Records, Young Thug	Slime Language 3
"Neighborhood Starz"	2026	Rylo Rodriguez, Kevin Gates	S.K.A.T.E
