= Fresh (Lil Baby album) =

2026 studio album by Lil Baby

Studio album by Lil Baby
- Released: November 6, 2026
- Length: 47:40
- Labels: Quality Control; Motown
- Producers: 30 Roc; 9Jay; Al'Geno; Atake; Baby Tsunami; Baso; BigCuz; Cam Rouse; Casper; Chichi; Childboy; Dealer; Dinuzzo; EJ Macc; Emil Dollaz; Hitmaka; Jayrich Laplaya; Juke Wong; JX; K6WYA; Keelondn; KutOff; Kyuro; LC; London on da Track; Mattazik Muzik; Mawzy; Metro Boomin; Zeus Negrete; Parko; Khaled Rohaim; SirFredo; Sloan; Taurus; Wana; Wheezy; Pharrell Williams; Wonderyo

Lil Baby chronology
The Leaks (2025)	Fresh (2026)

Singles from Fresh
- 1. "Dead Fresh" Released: July 17, 2026; 2. "Mr. Do Something" Released: November 6, 2026

Fresh (stylized in all caps) is the fifth studio album by American rapper Lil Baby, released on November 6, 2026, through Quality Control and Motown. It follows his studio album WHAM and the mixtape The Leaks (both 2025). The album features guest appearances from Future, Young Thug and Rylo Rodriguez. It was supported by the lead single "Dead Fresh", produced by Pharrell Williams, which peaked at number 18 on the Billboard Hot 100.

== Background and release ==
Lil Baby released his fourth studio album, WHAM, in January 2025. It debuted at number one on the Billboard 200, his fourth album to do so. He followed it in December with The Leaks, a mixtape that debuted at number 17 on the chart and included "Mrs. Trendsetter", which peaked at number 64 on the Hot 100. Over the summer of 2026, he teased a new project.

The lead single, "Dead Fresh", was released in July 2026. Pharrell Williams had previously premiered the song in June at Louis Vuitton's Spring–Summer 2027 men's show in Paris. In early October, Lil Baby released "Coast 2 Coast" with Bally Baby and Fatt Smaxk, which Pitchfork listed among the album's singles (though it ultimately did not appear on the album).

On October 16, Lil Baby posted a photo of a whiteboard with 17 song titles on Instagram, with a caption stating that the countdown to the album had begun and that it was 20 days away. He formally announced Fresh on October 20, revealing the album's release date, track listing and cover art. Pre-orders opened with the announcement, including bundles with signed vinyl, CDs, zip-up hoodies and long-sleeve shirts. The album reunites him with Future and Young Thug, who both appeared with him on "Dum, Dumb, and Dumber" from WHAM, a number 16 hit on the Hot 100. Lil Baby has also announced a birthday show, Lil Baby: Fresh Prince of Atlanta, scheduled for December 5 at State Farm Arena.

== Track listing ==
Fresh track listing
No.	Title	Writer(s)	Producer(s)	Length
1.	"Top Uh It"	Dominique Jones; Elijah Crawford; Evan Huang; Matthew Robinson; Luke Parkening	EJ Macc; K6WYA; Mattazik Muzik; Parko	2:26
2.	"Mr. Do Something"	D. Jones; Huang; Cameron Rouse; Brian Campi; Taurus Currie Jr.	K6WYA; Cam Rouse; Casper; Taurus	2:50
3.	"Burnt Shit"	D. Jones; Wesley Glass; Jayden Christodoulou	Wheezy; 9Jay	2:34
4.	"Be the One"	D. Jones; Robinson; Francesco Basato; Emil Videnski; Jonathan Mendoza	Mattazik Muzik; Baso; Emil Dollaz; JX	3:12
5.	"Ain't Goin"	D. Jones; Samuel Gloade; Jason Brown; Eric Sloan; Hampton Sallee; Jordan Holt-May; Raymond Lefevre	30 Roc; BigCuz; Sloan; Champ^{[a]}; Landstrip Chip^{[a]}	2:40
6.	"From the Back"	D. Jones; Huang; Christian Ward; Darrien Overton; Kristopher Campbell; Bobby Turner; Mychael Graves	K6WYA; Hitmaka; Dinuzzo	2:18
7.	"All My Partnas" (featuring Future, Young Thug and Rylo Rodriguez)	D. Jones; Nayvadius Wilburn; Jeffery Williams; Ryan Adams; Khaled Rohaim; London Holmes	Rohaim; London on da Track	3:09
8.	"My Side"	D. Jones; Robinson; Mendoza; Nathaniel Caiazzo	Mattazik Muzik; JX; Dealer	3:21
9.	"Life of the Party (L.O.T.P)"	D. Jones; Mendoza; Skyler Hancock; Zeus Negrete; Darius Poviliunas	JX; Mawzy; Negrete; Wonderyo	2:17
10.	"Dead Fresh"	D. Jones; Pharrell Williams	P. Williams	2:37
11.	"Your Fault"	D. Jones; Chidi Osondu; Hilary Udanoh; Sky Jones	Chichi	3:13
12.	"All Us"	D. Jones; W. Glass; Juke Wong	Wheezy; Juke Wong	2:41
13.	"In Your Head" (featuring Rylo Rodriguez)	D. Jones; Adams; Anh Tuan Tran; Richard DeBerry; Luke Clay; Antoine Barrel	Atake; Jayrich Laplaya; LC; Wana	3:24
14.	"Like a Brat"	D. Jones; Gene Hixon; KIrill Kornyshev	Al'Geno; Keelondn	3:11
15.	"Televised"	D. Jones; Negrete; Justin Glass; Jakob Hagemann; Frédéric Lapointe	Negrete; Baby Tsunami; KutOff; SirFredo	2:39
16.	"Rareform"	D. Jones; Deshawn Jackson; Maxwell Madejczyk	Childboy; Kyuro	2:06
17.	"Keep Goin"	D. Jones; Leland Wayne	Metro Boomin	3:02
Total length:				47:50

Bonus track
No.	Title	Writer(s)	Producer(s)	Length
18.	"From the Back" (Remix) (featuring Chris Brown)	D. Jones; Huang; Robinson; Ward; Overton; Campbell; Turner; Graves; Christopher Brown; Christopher Dotson; Omari Akinlolu	K6WYA; Hitmaka; Dinuzzo	3:29
Total length:				51:19

=== Note ===
- ^{^[a]} indicates an additional producer

== Personnel ==
Credits are adapted from Tidal.

- Lil Baby – vocals
- Colin Leonard – mastering
- Mattazik Muzik – engineering (tracks 1–12, 14–17), additional mixing (10)
- Jayrich Laplaya – engineering (2, 11, 13, 16), additional mixing (10)
- Thomas "Tillie" Mann – mixing (1–9, 11–17)
- Rylo Rodriguez – vocals (7, 13)
- Future – vocals (7)
- Young Thug – vocals (7)
- Zeus Negrete – engineering (9)
- Mike Larson – engineering, mixing (10)
- Benjamin Thomas – engineering (10)
- Leslie Brathwaite – mixing (10)
- Pharrell Williams – mixing (10)

== Charts ==
Chart performance for Fresh
Chart (2026)	Peak position
Australian Hip Hop/R&B Albums (ARIA)	9
Canadian Albums (Billboard)	29
Nigerian Albums (TurnTable)	49
Portuguese Streaming Albums (AFP)	177
Swiss Albums (Schweizer Hitparade)	93
UK Albums (Official Charts)	82
US Billboard 200	2
US Top R&B/Hip-Hop Albums (Billboard)	1
