= The Leaks =

Mixtape by Lil Baby
- Released: December 3, 2025
- Length: 41:29
- Labels: Glass Window; Wolfpack; Quality Control; Motown
- Producers: Al'Geno; Andyr; Ayl Prod; 43Juice; Baby Tsunami; Billy Bash; Brentrambo; Clif Shayne; DeepHartt; Dizzy Banko; DJ Moon; DJ Pooh; Egon; Frankie Bash; Gabe Lucas; Gedo; Getro; HK Blaze; LitJo; Lowso; Jr Hitmakers; JT Beatz; June the Genius; KP Beatz; Murda Beatz; Reggie Knoxx; SG1; Sid; Souli; T5; TM88; Trill Bans; Wheezy; Wzzptom; Y2krazy

Lil Baby chronology
WHAM (2025)	The Leaks (2025)	Fresh (2026)

Singles from The Leaks
- 1. "All on Me" Released: October 25, 2025; 2. "Try to Love" Released: November 5, 2025; 3. "Otha Boy" Released: November 12, 2025; 4. "Real Shit" Released: November 19, 2025; 5. "Middle of the Summer" Released: November 26, 2025

The Leaks is a commercial mixtape by American rapper Lil Baby. It was released through Glass Window Entertainment, Wolfpack, Quality Control Music and Motown on December 3, 2025. The mixtape contains guest appearances from Playboi Carti, Skooly, Lil Yachty, Lucki, Veeze, Young Thug, Rylo Rodriguez, Bino Rideaux, and G Herbo. Production was handled by June the Genius, Wheezy, Frankie Bash, Murda Beatz, and TM88, among others. The album was supported by five singles: "All on Me", "Try to Love", "Otha Boy", "Real Shit", and "Middle of the Summer", the former of which features G Herbo. It was released on Lil Baby's 31st birthday and is his second and last project of 2025, coming exactly eleven months after his fourth studio album, WHAM.

== Singles and promotion ==
On August 5, 2025, Lil Baby announced that he would be releasing a mixtape called The Leaks exactly a month later, revealing a teaser of a tracklist and featured artists. Ten days after announcing the project, he revealed its cover art and complete track listing. However, the release was indefinitely delayed for unknown reasons. After staying silent on social media for almost two months, he released the album's lead single, "All on Me", which features fellow American rapper G Herbo, on October 25. On November 4, he announced "Wham Wednesdays", a segment in which he would release a single from the album on every Wednesday in November until its release. The singles "Try to Love", "Otha Boy", "Real Shit", and "Middle of the Summer" were released on the 5th, 12th, 19th, and 26th of November respectively. On the same day as the latter single, he announced that the album would finally be released on December 3 2025 , his 31st birthday.

== Track listing ==
The Leaks track listing
No.	Title	Writer(s)	Producer(s)	Length
1.	"Mrs. Trendsetter"	Dominique Jones; June James; Honolta Bea Bikoi; Zeus Negrete	June the Genius; Billy Bash	2:29
2.	"Guaranteed"	Jones; Wesley Glass	Wheezy	2:11
3.	"Try to Love"	Jones; Justin Glass; Luka Berman; Tommaso D'Ambrosio; Negrete	Baby Tsunami; Gabe Lucas; Wzzptom	2:24
4.	"Nasty Girl"	Jones; Josiah Watts; Reginald Watts	LitJo; Reggie Knoxx	3:16
5.	"Real Shit"	Jones; Bryan Simmons; Josiah Rutherford; Angelo Kusko	43Juice; Souli	2:39
6.	"Violation"	Jones; Yannick Gujer; Nikita Lynchkin; Deandre Sumpter; Lenny Schmied; Gregory Ortiz	Ayl Prod; Dizzy Banko; Gedo; Lowso	1:52
7.	"Let's Do It" (with Playboi Carti and Skooly)	Jones; Jordan Carter; Kazarion Fowler; Clifton Shayne; Corey Moon; Kenneth Pannu; Kaelub Denson; Kentavious Burney; Charles Styles; Rashad Battle	Clif Shayne; DJ Moon; KP Beatz	3:22
8.	"Forever Slime"	Jones; Glass; Colin Franken	Wheezy; Frankie Bash	2:03
9.	"Middle of the Summer"	Jones; Andrej Marko; Tarkan Kozluklu; Peter Gogola	Andyr; Getro; T5	2:52
10.	"What She Like"	Jones; Shane Lindstrom; Marko Cervantes; Jabrielle Brooks	Murda Beatz; Trill Bans; Jr Hitmaker	3:08
11.	"Get Along" (with Lil Yachty, Lucki, and Veeze)	Jones; Miles McCollum; Lucki Camel, Jr.; Karon Vantrees; Abdul Thompson; Jalen Weise; John Weise; Sebastian Gonzalez; Negrete	Brentrambo; SG1; Y2krazy	2:54
12.	"Superman" (with Young Thug)	Jones; Jeffery Williams; Quandarious Jordan; Teriyakie Smith; Cory Way	Quando DaManSon	3:17
13.	"St Tropez" (with Rylo Rodriguez and Bino Rideaux)	Jones; Ryan Adams; Brandon Rainey; Gene Hixon; HyunGyu Lee; Ji Hwan Chun	Al'Geno; DeepHartt; HK Blaze
14.	"Otha Boy"	Jones; Simmons; Tapaquon Malabre	TM88; Sid	2:03
15.	"All on Me" (with G Herbo)	Jones; Herbert Wright III; James Therrien; Eric Williams; Maxwell Ramsey; Shannon Sanders; Negrete	JT Beatz; Egon	3:40
Total length:				41:29

=== Sample credits ===
- "Let's Do It" contains elements of "Wassup", written by Kazarion Fowler, Kaelub Denson, Kentavious Burney, Charles Styles and Rashad Battle, and performed by Rich Kidz.
- "Superman" contains a sample of "Dunn Dunn", written by Quandavious Jordan, Teriyakie Smith and Cory Way, and performed by Shawty Lo.
- "All on Me" contains a sample of "In My Mind", written by Shannon Sanders and Maxwell Ramsey, as performed by Heather Headley.

== Charts ==
Chart performance for The Leaks
Chart (2025)	Peak position
Canadian Albums (Billboard)	82
Nigerian Albums (TurnTable)	60
UK Album Streaming (Official Charts)	61
US Billboard 200	17
US Top R&B/Hip-Hop Albums (Billboard)	5
