= All on Me (disambiguation) =

"All on Me" is a song by Devin Dawson.

All on Me may also refer to:

- "All on Me" (Lil Baby song), 2025
- "All on Me", a song by Chris Brown from Indigo
- "All on Me", a song by Mayday Parade from Black Lines
- "All on Me", a song by Sean Paul from The Trinity
