= Let's Do It (song) =

2025 song by Lil Baby, Playboi Carti and Skooly

Song by Lil Baby, Playboi Carti and Skooly

from the album The Leaks
- Released: December 3, 2025
- Genre: Trap
- Length: 3:22
- Label: Glass Window; Wolfpack; Quality Control; Motown
- Songwriters: Dominique Jones; Jordan Carter; Kazarion Fowler; Clifton Shayne; Corey Moon; Kenneth Pannu; Kaelub Denson; Kentavious Burney; Charles Styles; Rashad Battle
- Producers: Clif Shayne; DJ Moon; KP Beatz

Music video
- "Let's Do It" on YouTube

"Let's Do It" is a song by American rappers Lil Baby, Playboi Carti and Skooly. It was released on December 3, 2025 from Lil Baby's mixtape The Leaks, after an early version of the song was teased in the previous months. Produced by Clif Shayne, DJ Moon and KP Beatz, the song contains a sample of "Wassup" by Rich Kidz.

== Composition and lyrics ==
"Let's Do It" is a trap song that finds the rappers celebrating their lavish lifestyle. Playboi Carti references Brabus and the Lamborghini Aventador SVJ in the refrain, while in the opening verse he describes shopping for expensive clothes, including Armani for his woman, name-drops the band Tame Impala and scorns college education. In the second verse, Lil Baby compares himself to rapper Flavor Flav and Chad "J-Bo" Brown of the Black Mafia Family, in regard to the women in his life and him selling drugs respectively.

== Music video ==
The music video was released alongside the song. It shows cars, cash and fancy clothes, with cameo appearances from Carti's Opium labelmates, such as Ken Carson and Destroy Lonely.

== Charts ==
Chart performance for "Let's Do It"
| Chart (2025) | Peak position |
|---|---|
| New Zealand Hot Singles (RMNZ) | 12 |
| US Billboard Hot 100 | 71 |
| US Hot R&B/Hip-Hop Songs (Billboard) | 10 |
