= Feet on Land =

2025 single by Moneybagg Yo and G Herbo

Single by Moneybagg Yo and G Herbo
- Released: October 24, 2025
- Genre: Hip-hop; trap
- Length: 2:32
- Label: Collective; N-Less; Interscope
- Songwriters: DeMario White Jr.; Herbert Wright III; Dwan Avery; Terrell McNeal; Bryson March; Cameron Giles; Andrew Thielk
- Producer: Krazy Mob

Moneybagg Yo singles chronology
"I'm Him" (2025)	"Feet on Land" (2025)

G Herbo singles chronology
"All on Me" (2025)	"Feet on Land" (2025)

Music video
- "Feet on Land" on YouTube

"Feet on Land" is a single by American rappers Moneybagg Yo and G Herbo, released on October 24, 2025. Produced by Krazy Mob, it contains a sample of "Killa Cam (Intro)" by Cam'ron.

== Background ==
In an interview with Ebro Darden, G Herbo stated the song was made after he attended Moneybagg Yo's birthday party. He said, "I just went straight to the studio and we did it. As soon as he played the beat, though, I'm like, 'Oh, yeah, this the one.'"

== Critical reception ==
Alexander Cole of HotNewHipHop gave a positive review, remarking "This song is as straightforward as you can get. The trap production drives the song forward, while both artists deliver solid verses with lots of wordplay. Their chemistry works, and it feels like we could get more collabs in the future. With this release, it's hard to imagine a world in which MoneyBagg Yo doesn't drop a new album sometime soon."

== Charts ==
Chart performance for "Feet on Land"
Chart (2025)	Peak position
US Bubbling Under Hot 100 (Billboard)	17
US Hot R&B/Hip-Hop Songs (Billboard)	35
