= Easy (DaniLeigh song) =

Single

- Remix cover art

Single by DaniLeigh featuring Chris Brown

from the album The Plan
- Released: November 30, 2018 (album version); May 31, 2019 (remix)
- Recorded: 2019
- Genre: R&B
- Length: 3:06 (album version); 3:07 (remix)
- Label: Def Jam
- Songwriters: Danielle Leigh Curiel; Christopher Maurice Brown; Fallon King; Christopher Allen Clark; Mathias Sorum; Ronald M. Ferebee Jr
- Producers: Fallon King; Christopher Allen Clark

DaniLeigh singles chronology
"No Limits" (2019)	"Easy (Remix)" (2019)	"Cravin" (2019)

Chris Brown singles chronology
"Light It Up" (2019)	"Easy (Remix)" (2019)	"Haute" (2019)

Music video
- "Easy" on YouTube

"Easy" is a song by Dominican-American singer DaniLeigh. It was later remixed with vocals from American R&B singer Chris Brown, and it was released on May 31, 2019, under Def Jam Recordings as a single.

== Composition ==
"Easy" is an R&B slow-jam produced by Fallon King and Christopher Allen Clark, where the singers perform a mutual serenade dedicated to the intimate moments of two people in love.

== Charts ==
=== Weekly charts ===
Chart (2019–2020)	Peak position
Australia (ARIA)	84
France (SNEP)	25
New Zealand Hot Singles (RMNZ)	11
US Billboard Hot 100	79
US Hot R&B/Hip-Hop Songs (Billboard)	34
US R&B/Hip-Hop Airplay (Billboard)	13
US Rhythmic Airplay (Billboard)	11

=== Year-end charts ===
Chart (2020)	Position
US Hot R&B/Hip-Hop Songs (Billboard)	85

== Certifications ==
Region	Certification	Certified units/sales
Brazil (Pro-Música Brasil)	2× Platinum	80,000^{‡}
Canada (Music Canada)	Platinum	80,000^{‡}
New Zealand (RMNZ)	2× Platinum	60,000^{‡}
United Kingdom (BPI)	Silver	200,000^{‡}
United States (RIAA)	4× Platinum	4,000,000^{‡}
^{‡} Sales+streaming figures based on certification alone.
