= DaniLeigh =

American singer and songwriter (born 1994)

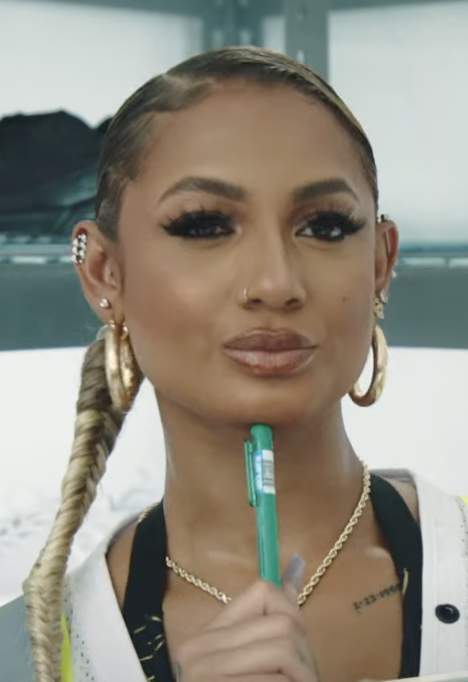
- DaniLeigh in October 2020
- Born: Danielle Leigh Curiel; December 20, 1994 (age 31); Miami, Florida, U.S.
- Occupations: Singer; songwriter; rapper; dancer; choreographer
- Years active: 2013–present
- Height: 5 ft 3 in (160 cm)
- Children: 1
- Musical career
- Genre: R&B
- Instrument: Vocals
- Label: Def Jam (former)
- Website: www.iamdanileigh.com

Danielle Leigh Curiel (born December 20, 1994), known professionally as DaniLeigh, is an American singer, songwriter, rapper and dancer. Initially appearing as a backup dancer, Curiel began her career by posting covers of popular songs on YouTube before moving to Los Angeles, California, where she began choreographing for other artists and dancing. She made a career breakthrough after working with Prince on the music video for his single "Breakfast Can Wait". DaniLeigh was signed to Def Jam Recordings in 2017, releasing mixtapes and singles starting that year.

== Early life ==
Danielle Leigh Curiel was born on December 20, 1994, in Miami, Florida. Her mother, Vicky Curiel, and her father, Vladimir Curiel, are from the Dominican Republic. She was deeply interested in music during her youth, and cites Missy Elliott, Aaliyah, Drake, and Rihanna as influences.

She started dancing at the age of 12 and singing at the age of 14, though she was initially too shy to sing in front of others until she received positive feedback. Though she started posting vocal covers of songs such as Musiq Soulchild's "SoBeautiful" on YouTube, her career did not officially start until she moved to Los Angeles, California, where she made connections and started off as a backup dancer to artists such as Pharrell Williams and Nelly Furtado. She also was part of the pop duo Curly Fryz, which she formed with her sister. She has an older brother, a rapper who goes by the name Brandon Bills.

== Career ==
Curiel was asked by Prince to direct the video for his single "Breakfast Can Wait" when she was 18 years old. Following the video's success, Prince continued mentoring DaniLeigh until his death in 2016. She released her first single "D.O.S.E" in 2015, but her first successful single was "Play", released in 2017. The single is an empowerment song for women and Latinos, and features Mexican-American rapper Kap G.

After signing with Def Jam Recordings, she released her first EP, Summer with Friends, in 2017, followed up by The Plan in 2018. The latter features appearances by rappers YG, Lil Yachty, Lil Baby, and YBN Nahmir. She later released a few more singles such as "Lil Bebe", which was remixed featuring vocals from Lil Baby, and "Easy", which was remixed featuring vocals from singer Chris Brown. She has also made a cameo appearance in the music video for Megan Thee Stallion's "Hot Girl Summer". In late 2019, she choreographed for DaBaby's music video "BOP on Broadway".

In January 2021, the singer issued an apology after posting part of a song called "Yellow Bone" on social media, which was criticized for promoting colorism.

== Musical style ==
DaniLeigh incorporates elements of hip hop and Latin music into her primarily R&B-style music.

== Personal life ==
Curiel was in a previous relationship with rapper DaBaby that ended in November of 2021. That year on July 17, she announced her pregnancy with their child in an Instagram post. Curiel gave birth to a girl, Velour, on August 11, 2021.

In October 2024, she announced that her father had died from cancer.

== Legal issues ==
=== DaBaby assault ===
On November 15, 2021, Curiel was charged with two counts of assault by then-boyfriend DaBaby. The latter then posted a statement on Instagram moments following the incident, confirming that he just wanted Curiel to be "peacefully removed" from his home. Shortly after, Curiel posted a story on Instagram in response, claiming that she refused to leave because she and her child were staying in Charlotte, North Carolina, and had no friends or family living nearby who could support her. Curiel stated: "[I’ll] learn and [I’ll] grow…And I’m sorry to my baby that her father is kicking her out her home at 3 months." In February the following year, DaBaby and his crew assaulted Curiel's brother Brandon at a bowling alley in Los Angeles after the latter confronted him for the mistreatment of his sister.

=== DUI hit and run ===
Curiel was convicted of DUI hit and run and sentenced to five years probation on February 1, 2024. She committed the crimes just before 1 a.m. Eastern Daylight Time May 30, 2023 in Miami Beach, and shortly afterwards was arrested and charged with leaving the scene of a crash including serious bodily injury, driving under the influence and damage to property or person while driving under the influence. The victim was a then-seventeen-year-old, riding what some reports called a moped and others a scooter, who sustained injuries including a lacerated kidney and fractured spine and was transported by emergency services to the Ryder Trauma Center in Miami for treatment. Curiel was reported by multiple witnesses to be weaving through traffic at high speed in a grey Mercedes-Benz G550 before hitting the victim, then continued driving, dragging the victim's moped/scooter under her vehicle for several blocks while witnesses attempted to flag her down.

Responding police attempted to pull Curiel over, but she refused at first, requiring multiple attempts. When she eventually pulled over, police noted sluggishness, the strong smell of alcohol and damage to the car possibly arising from the collision. Curiel was detained for investigation, during which she denied the collision and consuming any alcohol, though claimed to be driving from a Memorial Day party. She agreed to standardized field sobriety exercises, which indicated that she may be impaired. A search of her car was conducted by police who found an open bottle of tequila. She was arrested and transported to a police station where she was breathalyzed with results of 0.145% and 0.148% in two tests (meaning a blood alcohol content of 0.145g and 0.148g of alcohol for every 100 ml of blood), nearly twice the legal limit in Florida of 0.08%. Curiel was issued a US$1000 bond.

On February 1, 2024, Curiel pleaded no contest to one misdemeanor DUI charge and one felony DUI causing serious injury charge in front of a Miami-Dade County judge, while one charge for leaving the scene of a crime and one additional DUI charge were adjourned in contemplation of dismissal, to be dismissed if Curiel completes her probation without violations. Curiel's defense attorney, Michael Catalano, spoke with XXL stating:

[Curiel] wasn't really at fault in the accident and she didn't know she [hit] somebody, but there was damage to the car. She wants to say, 'I'm really sorry about this,' but [the victim] has a lawyer and we never let people talk because it can be held against them. The truth of the matter is, the gentlemen who got hurt, was at fault in the accident. She's very apologetic about it and feels horrible that somebody got hurt.

The victim filed a civil lawsuit against Curiel. Since Curiel's conviction, police bodycam and CCTV footage has been released and published, showing her arrest and the collision; Curiel can be heard making repeated comments about her fame as a singer during her detention, investigation and arrest, as well as laughing as she denies her crimes and claiming witnesses are lying.

== Discography ==
=== Studio albums ===
- The Plan (2018)
- Movie (2020)
- My Side (2022)
- With Love, From Dani (2026)

=== Extended plays ===
- Summer with Friends (2017)
- My Present (2019)

=== Compilations ===
- In My Feelings (2020)

=== Singles ===
List of singles showing year released and album name
Title	Year	Peak chart positions			Certifications	Album
Title	Year	US	US R&B/HH	AUS	Certifications	Album
"D.O.S.E"	2015	—	—	—		Non-album single
"In My Feelings" (featuring Kap G)	2017	—	—	—		Summer with Friends
"Lil Bebe" (featuring Lil Baby)	2018	—	—	—	RIAA: Platinum	The Plan
"Blue Chips"	2018	—	—	—		The Plan
"Life"	2018	—	—	—		Non-album singles
"Easy" (Solo or featuring Chris Brown)	2018	79	34	84	RIAA: 4× Platinum; BPI: Silver; MC: Platinum	Non-album singles
"No Limits"	2019	—	—	—		Non-album singles
"Cravin" (featuring G-Eazy)	2019	—	—	—		Non-album singles
"Levi High" (featuring DaBaby)	2020	—	—	—		Movie
"Dominican Mami" (featuring Fivio Foreign)	2020	—	—	—		Movie

== Awards and nominations ==
Award	Year	Nominee	Category	Result	Ref.
BET Awards	2020	Herself	Best New Artist	Nominated	
