= Hotboii =

American rapper from Florida

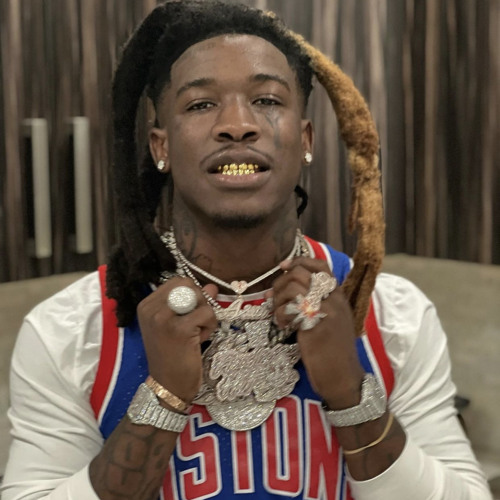
- Hotboii in 2021

Background information
- Also known as: Hotboii438; Double 0 Baby; Mr Kut The Fan On
- Born: Javarri Latre Walker; June 13, 2000 (age 26); Orlando, Florida, U.S.
- Genres: Southern hip-hop; trap
- Occupations: Rapper; singer; songwriter
- Years active: 2016–present
- Labels: Geffen; Interscope; Rebel; 22; Hitmaker
- Children: 1
- Website: www.hotboiistore.com
- Criminal information
- Status: Incarcerated from July 2022 to September 2024
- Criminal charges: Conspiracy to engage in a pattern of racketeering act (×1); Failure to appear (×1)

Details
- Date apprehended: June 30, 2022

Javarri Latre Walker (born June 13, 2000), known professionally as Hotboii (often stylized as H O T B O I I or HOTBOII), is an American rapper and singer from Orlando, Florida. His 2020 single, "Don't Need Time", received platinum certification by the Recording Industry Association of America (RIAA) and spawned a remix featuring American rapper Lil Baby. He signed with Geffen Records, Interscope Records and Rebel Music, in conjunction with Hitmaker Music Group and 22 Entertainment to release three studio albums: Double O Baby (2020), Life of a Hotboii (2021), and Blinded by Death (2022)—the latter of which entered the Billboard 200.

== Early life ==
Javarri Latre Walker was born on June 13, 2000, in Orlando, Florida, growing up in the Pine Hills neighborhood on the westside of Orlando as one of 17 siblings. He listened to artists such as Lil Wayne, Rich Homie Quan and Kodak Black. He began rapping at the age of seven and began releasing music in 2016 with the help of his mother, beginning by uploading music onto SoundCloud and YouTube.

Walker served two years in a juvenile detention program from 2016 to 2018 for breaking and entering. It was during this time that he decided to take his career more seriously, further developing his songwriting while in juvenile detention.

== Career ==
Just before his incarceration, Walker had begun to receive some attention locally for his song "Switcharoo". After his release in 2018, he began further pursuing a recording career, publishing his first music video in September of that year for his song "Life of a Dog". In 2019, he released the single "YG's", a "detailed walk through [his] experiences and survival tactics in the street" that quickly gained traction. He began 2020 by securing features from Stunna 4 Vegas ("4PF Like Baby") and Rylo Rodriguez ("Sick of Cell") before releasing his breakout single "Don't Need Time" on April 27. Written in memory of his recently deceased friend Wolph, the piano-driven track was notably slower-paced and more self-reflective than his previous songs. In five months it accumulated more than nine million streams on Spotify and 24 million YouTube views on its music video, which was shot at Wolph's funeral. On August 25, a remix featuring Lil Baby was released along with a new music video that addressed the theme of police brutality following the killing of another one of Hotboii's friends, Salaythis Melvin, by an Orange County sheriff's deputy earlier that month. "Don't Need Time" was certified Gold by the Recording Industry Association of America (RIAA) in April 2021 and Platinum in July 2022.

Hotboii released his first mixtape, Kut Da Fan On, on May 22, 2020. It included previous singles such as "Don't Need Time", "YG's", and "Goat Talk", and guest appearances from Florida-based rappers including Plies, LPB Poody, Rico Cartel and 438 Tok. Many of its songs were written during his time served in the juvenile detention program. Pitchfork noted how he "came into his own by polishing his blend of painful street tales and witty punchlines" on the project, while Audiomack called it "41 hyper-realistic and melodic minutes of contemporary hip-hop goodness." After releasing further music videos, he secured a guest feature from Chicago rapper Polo G on "Goat Talk 2", a follow-up to the original which became among his most popular songs.

He signed with Interscope Records, Geffen Records, and Jay Rebel's Rebel Music to release his debut studio album, Double O Baby on December 22. It contained guest features from Lil Mosey, Toosii and Pooh Shiesty. Expanding on the theme from his previous project, songs such as "Police Brutality", "Malcolm X" and "Problems (No Rights)" addressed social issues which faced the African-American community, in context of that year's George Floyd protests and specifically his friend Salaythis Melvin's killing by police. Elevator Mag praised his "masterful flow and soul-baring storytelling" on the album. Later that month, he performed on the Rolling Loud's Home for the Holidaze livestream, headlined by Rick Ross.

Following the February 2021 release of "Fuck Shit", Hotboii returned on May 28 with the single and music video for "Nobody Special", featuring Future. Hotboii was scheduled to perform at Rolling Loud Miami from July 23 to 25, 2021.

On July 29, 2022, Hotboii released his third studio album, Blinded by Death. It contained higher-profile guest appearances from Lil Uzi Vert, Big30, and Kodak Black, with "Nobody Special" serving as its lead single. The album debuted at number 89 on the Billboard 200, marking his first project to appear on mainstream music charts. Shortly after its release, he was incarcerated once more due to legal circumstances which remain unbeknownst to the public. While on bail, in October of the following year, he released the single "N.A.S.A.", with frequent collaborator and record producer ATL Jacob. He was released from prison in September 2024.

== Legal issues ==
Walker was arrested on July 12, 2021, on charges of racketeering and conspiracy to commit racketeering. He was booked at the Orange County Sheriff's Office in Orlando and his bond was revoked. In early February 2025, it was reported that Walker was arrested again on alleged probation violation and gang activity.

== Personal life ==
Walker has a son. Walker has symptoms of ADHD.

== Discography ==
=== Studio albums ===
Title	Album details	Peak chart positions	
Title	Album details	US	US Heat.
Double O Baby	Released: December 11, 2020; Label: Geffen, Interscope, Rebel; Format: Digital download, streaming	—	1
Life of a Hotboii	Released: December 10, 2021; Label: Geffen, Interscope, Rebel; Format: Digital download, streaming	—	1
Blinded by Death	Released: July 29, 2022; Label: Geffen, Interscope, Rebel; Format: Digital download, streaming	89	—

=== Mixtapes ===
Title	Mixtape details	Peak chart positions
Title	Mixtape details	US Heat.
Kut Da Fan On	Released: May 22, 2020; Label: Hitmaker, 22; Format: Digital download, streaming	5

=== Singles ===
==== As lead artist ====
List of singles as lead artist showing year released and album name
Title	Year	Certifications	Album
"Inda Booth"	2016		Non-album singles
"Ping Pong" (with LPD Poody)	2019		Non-album singles
"In A Cell"	2019		Kut Da Fan On
"Go Up"	2019		Kut Da Fan On
"4Pf Like Baby" (featuring Stunna 4 Vegas)	2020		Non-album singles
"Goat Talk" (solo or featuring Polo G)	2020		Kut Da Fan On
"Sick Of Cell" (featuring Rylo Rodriguez)	2020		Non-album singles
"Where the Love" (featuring 438 Tok)	2020		Kut Da Fan On
"They Don't Know"	2020		Kut Da Fan On
"Don't Need Time" (solo or featuring Lil Baby)	2020	RIAA: Platinum	Kut Da Fan On
"Left Lonely"	2020		Double O Baby
"How It Go" (with Slatt Zy)	2020		East Lake Projects
"War Ready (Remix)" (with DaDa1k)	2020		Non-album singles
"Dim"	2020		Non-album singles
"Police Brutality"	2020		Double O Baby
"No Limit"	2020		Double O Baby
"Menace"	2020		Double O Baby
"Fuck Shit"	2021		Non-album singles
"Cheese" (with Mike Smiff)	2021		Non-album singles
"Nobody Special" (with Future)	2021	RIAA: Gold	Life of a Hotboii
"Oath"	2021		Non-album singles
"One In A Million"	2021		Non-album singles
"All The Opps"	2021		Life of a Hotboii
"Never Say Never"	2021		Life of a Hotboii
"Doctor" (featuring Lil Tjay)	2021		Life of a Hotboii
"Offset"	2021		Life of a Hotboii
"Lately"	2022		Non-album singles
"All I Know"	2022		Non-album singles
"WTF"	2022		Blinded by Death
"Rich How I'm Dyin"	2022		Blinded by Death
"Live Life Die Faster" (with Kodak Black)	2022		Blinded by Death
"Tell Me Bout It"	2022		Blinded by Death
"Over Again"	2022		Blinded by Death (Deluxe)
"Block Lit" (with Lil 50)	2022		Non-album singles
"WTF (Remix)" (featuring Polo G)	2023		Non-album singles
"Dabs" (with VVS Ken)	2023		Non-album singles
"NASA" (with ATL Jacob)	2023		Non-album singles
"9/11 (First Day Out)"	2024		Non-album singles
"No Feelings"	2024		Non-album singles
"Z What I Z"	2025		TBA
"Cornball"	2025		TBA
"These Walls Could Talk"	2025		TBA
"Triple 9"	2025		TBA
"Imma Be Fine"	2025		TBA
