= U-Digg =

2022 single by Lil Baby and 42 Dugg featuring Veeze

Single by Lil Baby and 42 Dugg featuring Veeze
- Released: June 17, 2022
- Length: 3:55
- Label: 4PF; Motown; Quality Control
- Songwriters: Dominique Jones; Dion Hayes; Karon Vantrees; Jay Jenkins; Christopher Gholson; Robert Hill; Anthony Mathis
- Producer: Antt Beatz

Lil Baby singles chronology
| "Voodoo (Remix)" (2022) | "U-Digg" (2022) | "All Dz Chainz" (2022) |

42 Dugg singles chronology
| "Soon" (2022) | "U-Digg" (2022) | "IDGAF" (2022) |

Veeze singles chronology
| "Let It Fly" (2022) | "U-Digg" (2022) | "Close Friends" (2022) |

Music video
- "U-Digg" on YouTube

"U-Digg" is a song by American rappers Lil Baby and 42 Dugg featuring fellow American rapper Veeze. It was released on June 17, 2022 and was produced by Antt Beatz.

== Composition ==
Shawn Grant of The Source described the song as having a "blend of Atlanta and Detroit brings the familiar energy of Baby and Dugg that is previously heard on street classics like 'We Paid.'" In the song, the three rappers "weave within each other", and deliver "boastful" lyrics about "wealth, women and weapons".

== Music video ==
The music video was directed by Lil Baby himself and released alongside the single. It begins with Lil Baby having a phone call. He, 42 Dugg and Veeze then each walk down a staircase with bags of money. Through most of the video, the three are surrounded by Maybachs and Campagna T-Rex's, while showing off how much money they have. Lil Baby is also seen riding around in luxury vehicles and "bench pressing" his stacks of money.

== Charts ==
Chart performance for "U-Digg"
| Chart (2022) | Peak position |
|---|---|
| Canada Hot 100 (Billboard) | 69 |
| Global 200 (Billboard) | 108 |
| US Billboard Hot 100 | 52 |
| US Hot R&B/Hip-Hop Songs (Billboard) | 16 |
