= F U 2X =

2024 song by Lil Baby

Song by Lil Baby

from the album WHAM
- Released: January 3, 2025
- Genre: Trap
- Length: 1:57
- Label: Capitol; Motown; Wolfpack; Quality Control
- Songwriters: Dominique Jones; Hampton Sallee III
- Producer: DJ Champ

Music video
- "F U 2X" on YouTube

"F U 2X" is a song by American rapper Lil Baby. The track was released on January 3, 2025, as the third track off of Baby's fourth studio album, WHAM. The track was produced by DJ Champ who wrote the track alongside Lil Baby. The song garnered attention online because "F U 2x" is recalled a diss track to professional wrestler and social media influencer Logan Paul.

== Music video ==
The music video for the track was released on January 3, 2025, premiering alongside the release of Lil Baby's album WHAM. The video was directed by Shaq Simmons.

== Critical reception ==
Vivian Medithi of Fader had mixed reviews the track, stating that "F U 2X" is a "breathless sprint", and has insipid bars that "fall flat" on a closer listen.

== Charts ==
Chart performance for "F U 2X"
Chart (2025)	Peak position
Global 200 (Billboard)	187
US Billboard Hot 100	57
US Hot R&B/Hip-Hop Songs (Billboard)	15
