= Lil Bebe =

2018 single by DaniLeigh

Single by DaniLeigh

from the album The Plan
- Released: July 19, 2018
- Genre: Trap
- Length: 2:54
- Label: Def Jam
- Songwriters: Danielle Curiel; Ishmael Montague; Jaz Woodard; Jocelyn Donald; Tavoris Hollins Jr.
- Producers: ISM; Grammy SZN

DaniLeigh singles chronology
| "Life" (2018) | "Lil Bebe" (2018) | "Blue Chips" (2018) |

Music video
- "Lil Bebe" on YouTube

Remix cover
- Cover art of the official remix featuring Lil Baby.

Lil Baby singles chronology
| "Rapper & Trapper" (2018) | "Lil Bebe (Remix)" (2018) | "Alley Oop" (2018) |

Music video
- "Lil Bebe (Remix)" on YouTube

"Lil Bebe" is a song by American singer DaniLeigh, released on July 19, 2018 as the lead single from her debut studio album The Plan (2018). Produced by ISM and Grammy SZN, it is considered her breakout hit. An official remix of the song featuring American rapper Lil Baby was released on November 2, 2018.

== Music video ==
The music video was released on October 12, 2018. It takes place in downtown Los Angeles, at a sneaker shop connected to a bodega. DaniLeigh, who is depicted as the store owner, first walks in and signs off on an order before heading to the sneaker shop inside. She cheers up a sad little boy by giving him a box of brand new sneakers and dances with the nearby kids. DaniLeigh moves on to the next room, a barbershop, where her brother, who is a barber, is cutting Trey Songz's hair. She dances through the venue, and also with friends and children. The visual features cameos from Rotimi, YesJulz, Kamaiyah and dancers from the Millennium Dance Complex.

In an interview with Billboard, DaniLeigh said:

I was very involved with the video. I definitely saw a vision. What works for me on my socials and everything and what people tend to gravitate towards is when I show my personality, style, and my dancing. Also, I don’t like videos that have so many cuts in them so I really wanted to capture a one-take type of continuous feel for the video. This video represents me because of the setting, but also people I know are in the video as well.

DaniLeigh also added "It was dope to have my people in the video and see them pulling up for me. I wanted to bring everyone through an experience." In a January 2019 interview with Harper's Bazaar, DaniLeigh revealed that rapper YG was planned to appear in the video, but was shooting another music video at the time.

== Remixes ==
Prior to working with Lil Baby, DaniLeigh already wanted to collaborate with him on a remix of the song. An official remix was released on November 2, 2018 and features an additional verse from Lil Baby. A music video for the remix was released in February 2019. It sees Baby and Danileigh in an industrial setting, with a vintage car in the background and choreography led by DaniLeigh. A second remix, titled the "Bebecito Remix", was released on March 30, 2019. It features Puerto Rican singers Nio García and Rauw Alejandro and is performed in Spanish.

== Certifications ==
| Region | Certification | Certified units/sales |
|---|---|---|
| United States (RIAA) | Platinum | 1,000,000^{‡} |
^{‡} Sales+streaming figures based on certification alone.
