= Dead Fresh =

2026 single by Lil Baby

Single by Lil Baby

from the album Fresh
- Released: July 17, 2026
- Genre: Trap
- Length: 2:37
- Label: Quality Control; Motown
- Songwriters: Dominique Jones; Pharrell Williams
- Producer: Pharrell Williams

Lil Baby singles chronology
"Alicia" (2026)	"Dead Fresh" (2026)

Music video
- "Dead Fresh" on YouTube

"Dead Fresh" is a song by American rapper Lil Baby, released on July 17, 2026 through Quality Control Music and Motown, as the lead single from his fifth studio album, Fresh. It was produced by Pharrell Williams, who first premiered the song at Louis Vuitton's Spring-Summer 2027 Men's Show in June 2026.

== Content ==
Lyrically, the song finds Lil Baby reflecting on his rise to success from humble beginnings, while also celebrating the lifestyle that comes with it, including luxurious fashion and jewelry.

== Music video ==
An official music video was released on July 20, 2026. Directed by Kid Art, it features scenes set on a golf course, tennis court and the front row of a fashion show, along with high-end cars. Lil Baby sports clothing from various high fashion and streetwear brands, such as Victor Victor x Eric Emanuel, Prada, Jacquemus, Bottega Veneta, Louis Vuitton, Gucci, Balenciaga, Miu Miu, Diesel, Kenzo, Supreme and Mattias Gollin.

== Charts ==
Chart performance for "Dead Fresh"
Chart (2026)	Peak position
Canada Hot 100 (Billboard)	27
Global 200 (Billboard)	54
South Africa Streaming (TOSAC)	79
UK Singles (Official Charts)	84
US Billboard Hot 100	18
US Hot R&B/Hip-Hop Songs (Billboard)	2
US Rhythmic Airplay (Billboard)	1
