= Try to Love =

2025 single by Lil Baby

Single by Lil Baby

from the album The Leaks
- Released: November 5, 2025
- Length: 2:23
- Label: Quality Control; Motown
- Songwriters: Dominique Jones; Justin Glass; Luka Berman; Tommaso D'Ambrosio; Zeus Negrete
- Producers: Baby Tsunami; Gabe Lucas; Wzzptom

Lil Baby singles chronology
"Plenty" (2025)	"Try to Love" (2025)	"Otha Boy" (2025)

Music video
- "Try to Love" on YouTube

"Try to Love" is a single by American rapper Lil Baby, released on November 5, 2025 with an accompanying music video. It is the first installment of his song series "Wham Wednesdays". The song was produced by Baby Tsunami, Gabe Lucas and Wzzptom.

== Background ==
The song circulated online for a while before it was released. An early version of the song features a verse from rapper Lil Durk, but the final version is entirely handled by Lil Baby.

== Composition and lyrics ==
"Try to Love" is an emotional song with an instrumental described as reminiscent of "Hurricane" by Kanye West and the Weeknd (which features Lil Baby). Lyrically, it finds Lil Baby crooning about seeking love, only to be met with disappointing results ("Thought I found love in Chicago / But she didn't hit me back in the morrow / I guess all those words were just hollow / Thought I found in love in Atlanta / Until she went ghost like a phantom / I don't know why, I try to love"), and how it has affected him.

== Music video ==
The music video was shot in Morocco, where Lil Baby is seen on vacation with a gorgeous view.

== Charts ==
Chart performance for "Try to Love"
Chart (2025)	Peak position
US Bubbling Under Hot 100 (Billboard)	22
US Hot R&B/Hip-Hop Songs (Billboard)	27
