= By Myself (Lil Baby and Rylo Rodriguez song) =

2025 song by Lil Baby and Rylo Rodriguez featuring Rod Wave

Song by Lil Baby and Rylo Rodriguez featuring Rod Wave

from the album WHAM
- Released: January 3, 2025
- Recorded: 2024
- Genre: Trap
- Length: 3:17
- Label: Quality Control; Motown; Glass Window; Wolfpack
- Songwriters: Dominique Jones; Ryan Adams; Rodarius Green; Dwan Avery; Corey Moon; William Keating; Phil Cronin
- Producers: Krazy Mob; DJ Moon; Williskeating; Phil Cronin

Music video
- "By Myself" on YouTube

"By Myself" is a song by American rappers Lil Baby and Rylo Rodriguez featuring American rapper Rod Wave from Lil Baby's fourth studio album, WHAM (2025). It was produced by Krazy Mob, DJ Moon, Williskeating, and Phil Cronin.

== Composition ==
"By Myself" is a melodic song in which the rappers reflect on their roads to success and those who helped them during the journey.

== Critical reception ==
Elias Andrews of HotNewHipHop wrote "Lil Baby does his thing on the song, but Rod Wave may steal the show here. The rapper is known for putting forth a somber and mournful personal. It's become a meme at this point, to get Rod Wave on a song if you want it to sound sad. There's a reason why, though: he's good at it. Wave sounds fantastic on this moody instrumental, and he gives his all during the music video. He's the artist who seems to be the most invested in the emotion being conveyed by the chorus and the verses. Rylo Rodriguez does a fine job on the back end of the song."

== Music video ==
The music video was released on January 6, 2025. Directed by Nyce, it finds the three rappers at an apartment complex and gambling with massive amounts of cash in a game of craps in a hallway. The clip contains footage filmed from a hand-held camera, in both color and black-and-white.

== Charts ==
Chart performance for "By Myself"
Chart (2025)	Peak position
Global 200 (Billboard)	169
New Zealand (Recorded Music NZ)	15
US Billboard Hot 100	44
US Hot R&B/Hip-Hop Songs (Billboard)	10
