= Can't Leave Without It =

2018 song by 21 Savage featuring Lil Baby and Gunna

Song by 21 Savage featuring Lil Baby and Gunna

from the album I Am > I Was
- Released: December 21, 2018
- Length: 3:25
- Label: Slaughter Gang LLC; Epic
- Songwriters: Shéyaa Abraham-Joseph; Dominique Jones; Sergio Kitchens; Wesley Glass; Kevin Gomringer; Tim Gomringer
- Producers: Wheezy; Cubeatz

"Can't Leave Without It" (stylized in all lowercase) is a song by Atlanta-based rapper 21 Savage featuring American rappers Lil Baby and Gunna. Written alongside producers Wheezy and Cubeatz, it was released on December 21, 2018, as a track from the former's second studio album I Am > I Was.

== Composition ==
The song contains dark piano keys and flute in the production. In his verse, 21 Savage raps about keeping a gun for protection.

== Charts ==
Chart (2018–2019)	Peak position
Canada Hot 100 (Billboard)	70
New Zealand Hot Singles (RMNZ)	12
US Billboard Hot 100	58
US Hot R&B/Hip-Hop Songs (Billboard)	18

== Certifications ==
Region	Certification	Certified units/sales
Brazil (Pro-Música Brasil)	Gold	20,000^{‡}
Canada (Music Canada)	2× Platinum	160,000^{‡}
New Zealand (RMNZ)	Gold	15,000^{‡}
United Kingdom (BPI)	Silver	200,000^{‡}
United States (RIAA)	2× Platinum	2,000,000^{‡}
^{‡} Sales+streaming figures based on certification alone.
