= Outfit (song) =

2025 song by Lil Baby and 21 Savage

Song by Lil Baby and 21 Savage

from the album WHAM
- Released: January 3, 2025
- Length: 2:57
- Label: Quality Control; Motown
- Songwriters: Dominique Jones; Shéyaa A. Joseph; Zeus Negrete; Mateen Niknam; Ethan Hayes; Nikita Murenets; Joshua Taylor
- Producers: AyoPeeb; Haze; Splited Stupid; Josh Taylor

"Outfit" is a song by American rapper Lil Baby and British-American rapper 21 Savage from Lil Baby's fourth studio album, WHAM (2025). It was produced by AyoPeeb, Haze, Splited Stupid, and Josh Taylor.

== Composition ==
Produced by four different producers, the song features two verses and a chorus, with Baby singing the first chorus solo and the final chorus sung by both Baby and Savage. Baby boasts about wealth, street life, and sensual appeals on the track, while Savage also raps about street life, riches, and extravagance. Critics and fans believe that Savage was dissing Kendrick Lamar and siding with Drake during the Drake-Kendrick Lamar feud in the lines: "Bought Drake with me / and it ain't no kung-fu."

== Critical reception ==
The song received widespread critical acclaim. StayFreeRadio, a music review outlet, praised the song for its multiple layers of charisma and energy, noting that it focused on riches and street credibility.

== Charts ==
=== Weekly charts ===
Weekly chart performance for "Outfit"
Chart (2025)	Peak position
Canada Hot 100 (Billboard)	82
Global 200 (Billboard)	153
Greece International (IFPI)	66
New Zealand Hot Singles (RMNZ)	8
US Billboard Hot 100	50
US Hot R&B/Hip-Hop Songs (Billboard)	12

=== Year-end charts ===
Year-end chart performance for "Outfit"
Chart (2025)	Position
US Hot R&B/Hip-Hop Songs (Billboard)	97
