= Don't Need Time =

2020 single by Hotboii

Single by Hotboii

from the album Kut Da Fan On
- Released: April 27, 2020
- Length: 2:04
- Label: 22; Hitmaker
- Songwriters: Javarri Walker; Kevin Webb; Henock Siyoum
- Producers: K Hendrix; LilHBeats

Hotboii singles chronology
"Where the Love" (2020)	"Don't Need Time" (2020)	"They Don't Know" (2020)

Music video
- "Don't Need Time" on YouTube
- "Don't Need Time (Remix)" on YouTube

"Don't Need Time" is a song by American rapper Hotboii, released on April 27, 2020 with an accompanying music video. It is the fifth single from his debut mixtape Kut Da Fan On (2020) and is considered his breakout hit. The song was produced by K Hendrix and LilHBeats.

== Composition ==
"Don't Need Time" is a piano-driven song and tribute to Hotboii's deceased friend Wolph. It sees Hotboii questioning and reflecting on his loss, as well as violence in the streets and the harsh realities of living there.

== Remix ==
On August 25, 2020, an official remix of the song featuring American rapper Lil Baby was released. In his verse, Lil Baby reflects on the violence during his time in the streets, his substance abuse and how the death of fellow rapper Marlo has impacted him.

A music video was released alongside the remix. It pays homage to Salaythis Melvin, a friend of Hotboii who was shot and killed by police outside a mall in Orlando on August 7, 2020, opening with a news story about the killing. Hotboii is seen in a cemetery as he watches the police shooting a Black man on his phone. He and his crew also pour out several bottles of liquor during Lil Baby's verse.

== Certifications ==
Region	Certification	Certified units/sales
United States (RIAA)	Platinum	1,000,000^{‡}
^{‡} Sales+streaming figures based on certification alone.
