= All Dz Chainz =

2022 single by Gucci Mane featuring Lil Baby

Single by Gucci Mane featuring Lil Baby

from the album So Icy Boyz 22
- Released: June 29, 2022
- Length: 2:18
- Label: 1017; Atlantic
- Songwriters: Radric Davis; Dominique Jones; Wesley Glass; Lucas DePante
- Producers: Wheezy; Juke Wong

Gucci Mane singles chronology
"Mrs. Davis" (2022)	"All Dz Chainz" (2022)	"Dissin the Dead" (2022)

Lil Baby singles chronology
"U-Digg" (2022)	"All Dz Chainz" (2022)	"Never Sleep" (2022)

Music video
- "All Dz Chainz" on YouTube

"All Dz Chainz" is a song by American rapper Gucci Mane featuring fellow American rapper Lil Baby. Written alongside producers Wheezy and Juke Wong, it was released on June 29, 2022 as the lead single from the former's compilation album So Icy Boyz 22.

== Composition and lyrics ==
The song begins with Lil Baby sing-rapping via Auto-Tune about the luxury in his life and envy that comes with being in his position in the rap industry. Then, Gucci Mane pays tribute to the rapper Trouble, who died a few weeks before the song's release, and calls for fellow rappers Young Thug, Gunna, Foogiano, and Pooh Shiesty (all of whom he's collaborated with) to be released from prison. In addition, Mane addresses the topic of lyrics being used against artists in court ("The DA bring up lyrics in the court, may not be even true / And try to pen some shit next to your name that you ain't even do") and reflects on the jealousy that threatens his safety.

== Critical reception ==
Aaron Williams of Uproxx stated, "Gucci and Baby's powers combine on the track, with both icons feeding on each other's energy, making for a powerful statement of solidarity for multiple generations of Atlanta hip-hop." Jon Powell of Revolt commented that the song "boasts one of Lil Baby's best verses of all time".

== Music video ==
The music video was released alongside the single. It sees the rappers in a warehouse setting, showing off their collection of "iced-out chains". In reference to his verse, Gucci Mane dons a hoodie emblazoned with "FREE YSL" on the front.

== Charts ==
Chart performance for "All Dz Chainz"
Chart (2022)	Peak position
US Bubbling Under Hot 100 (Billboard)	19
US Hot R&B/Hip-Hop Songs (Billboard)	42
