= All on Me (Lil Baby song) =

2025 single by Lil Baby featuring G Herbo

Single by Lil Baby featuring G Herbo

from the album The Leaks
- Released: October 25, 2025
- Genre: Hip-hop; trap
- Length: 3:39
- Label: Quality Control; Motown
- Songwriters: Dominique Jones; James Therrien; Eric Williams; Maxwell Ramsey; Shannon Sanders; Zeus Negrete
- Producers: JT Beatz; Egon

Lil Baby singles chronology
"Drugs Callin (Remix)" (2025)	"All on Me" (2025)	"Plenty" (2025)

G Herbo singles chronology
"Feet on Land" (2025)	"All on Me" (2025)

Music video
- "All on Me" on YouTube

"All on Me" is a single by American rapper Lil Baby featuring American rapper G Herbo, released on October 25, 2025. It was produced by JT Beatz and Egon. The song contains a sample of "In My Mind" by Heather Headley.

== Composition ==
In the song, Lil Baby addresses multiple topics, such as fatherhood, being Black in America, the hard work required to achieve his high position, struggling with addiction, and facing betrayals, over a "hopeful, but sullen beat". Baby also describes his strong control over his surroundings, namely his ability to help release his friends from jail and steal a woman's heart. G Herbo details his journey to become a leader, including learning to distance himself from people or situations that may be deceiving, as well as his mistakes and lessons along the way. In addition, Herbo mentions returning to Chicago to ensure the well-being of his community, despite him and his girlfriend disliking the city.

== Critical reception ==
Zachary Horvath of HotNewHipHop considered the song "a strong return for Lil Baby and one we hope lands on one of his two rumored projects to-be."

== Charts ==
Chart performance for "All on Me"
Chart (2025)	Peak position
US Bubbling Under Hot 100 (Billboard)	6
US Hot R&B/Hip-Hop Songs (Billboard)	28
