= Mrs. Trendsetter =

2025 song by Lil Baby

Song by Lil Baby

from the album The Leaks
- Released: December 3, 2025
- Length: 2:28
- Label: Glass Window; Wolfpack; Quality Control; Motown
- Songwriters: Dominique Jones; June James; Honolta Bea Bikoi; Zeus Negrete
- Producers: June the Genius; Billy Bash

Music video
- "Mrs. Trendsetter" on YouTube

"Mrs. Trendsetter" is a song by American rapper Lil Baby, released on December 3, 2025, from his mixtape The Leaks. It was produced by June the Genius and Billy Bash.

== Music video ==
An official music video was directed by Mikey Rare and released on March 12, 2026. It was previously teased in an Instagram video featuring Lil Baby in a podcast-style conversation discussing the identity of "Mrs. Trendsetter". The clip opens with a woman waking up at 5 a.m. and going to the gym, where Lil Baby is training and performing. It then follows a group of women called the "Trendsetters", who are connected through a group chat and pursue successful careers as creative directors and social media influencers.

== Charts ==
Chart performance for "Mrs. Trendsetter"
Chart (2025–2026)	Peak position
US Billboard Hot 100	64
US Hot R&B/Hip-Hop Songs (Billboard)	14
US Rhythmic Airplay (Billboard)	24
