= Dum, Dumb, and Dumber =

2025 song by Lil Baby, Young Thug, and Future

Song by Lil Baby, Young Thug, and Future

from the album WHAM
- Released: January 3, 2025
- Genre: Trap
- Length: 3:47
- Label: Quality Control; Motown
- Songwriters: Dominique Jones; Jeffery Williams; Nayvadius Wilburn; Wesley Glass; Lucas DePante
- Producers: Wheezy; Juke Wong

Music video
- "Dum, Dumb, and Dumber" on YouTube

"Dum, Dumb, and Dumber" is a song by American rappers Lil Baby, Young Thug, and Future from the former's fourth studio album, WHAM (2025). It was produced by Wheezy and Juke Wong. The song marks Young Thug's first release after being released from jail in October 2024.

== Composition ==
"Dum, Dumb, and Dumber" features three verses, one from each artist. The track finds Lil Baby and Future boasting about their wealth in their verses, while Young Thug addresses his recent racketeering trial.

== Critical reception ==
The song was met with acclaim from music critics. Clash's Robin Murray wrote that Thug was WHAM's "most headline-worthy feature" and that the track is "an incredible moment". Pitchfork's Olivier Lafontant wrote that on the track, "Baby, Thug, and Future lace the most exorbitant, gold-plated frills they can put into words over doomsday bells and first-class snare rolls".

== Charts ==
=== Weekly charts ===
Weekly chart performance for "Dum, Dumb, and Dumber"
Chart (2025)	Peak position
Canada Hot 100 (Billboard)	38
Global 200 (Billboard)	32
Greece International (IFPI)	29
New Zealand Hot Singles (RMNZ)	5
UK Singles (OCC)	46
UK Hip Hop/R&B (OCC)	9
US Billboard Hot 100	16
US Hot R&B/Hip-Hop Songs (Billboard)	4
US Rhythmic Airplay (Billboard)	33

=== Year-end charts ===
Year-end chart performance for "Dum, Dumb, and Dumber"
Chart (2025)	Position
US Hot R&B/Hip-Hop Songs (Billboard)	49
