= WHAM (album) =

- Standard cover; the "Extended Version" cover includes red text and silver jewelry.

Studio album by Lil Baby
- Released: January 3, 2025
- Recorded: 2023–2024
- Genres: Hip-hop; trap
- Length: 41:12
- Labels: Quality Control; Motown; Glass Window; Wolfpack
- Producers: Aaron Paris; Andyr; BeatsByTaz; BlayzeBeats; DJ Champ; DJ Moon; Elementry; Emildollaz; Fizzle; Frankie Bash; Getro; Haze; Hurtboy AG; JG; Josh Taylor; Juke Wong; King LeeBoy; Krazy Mob; London on da Track; Nick Lee; OB Mus1c; Peeb; Phil Cronin; Southside; Splited Stupid; T9C; That Boy Daymon; Wheezy; Williskeating; ZtheSavage

Lil Baby chronology
It's Only Me (2022)	WHAM (2025)	The Leaks (2025)

WHAM (an acronym for Who Hard as Me) is the fourth studio album by American rapper Lil Baby. It was released on January 3, 2025, by Quality Control Music, Motown, Glass Window Entertainment, and Wolfpack. The album features guest appearances from Young Thug, Future, GloRilla, Rylo Rodriguez, Rod Wave, Travis Scott, and 21 Savage. The extended version was released four days later and includes four additional tracks. Production on the album was handled by several producers, including Frankie Bash, London on da Track, Southside, and Wheezy, among others. It serves as the follow-up to Lil Baby's previous album, It's Only Me (2022), and is the fourth and final installment of his Hard series, following his debut studio album, Harder Than Ever (2018).

== Background and recording ==
Upon the release of WHAM, Lil Baby appeared in a cover story interview with Complex, in which he spoke about the creation of the album. During the interview, he revealed that he began working on the record in September 2023 in Atlanta and Miami following the completion of his It's Only Us Tour. Baby described the record as his "young nigga street shit", stating that the goal for the album was to prove those who doubted him wrong. When asked about how he experimented with his sound on the album, Baby said:

I definitely experimented with my sounds and flows because, at first, I never thought to even try to change my flow or change my sound. This time, I actually put thought into it. I actually went back this time and redid stuff and tightened stuff up—versus in the past, whatever I recorded, that's how I left it. I just mixed it and that was the end. Now I'm taking more time and going back and changing little words and saying shit in a different pitch or a different tone. Putting more time into the artistry of it, rather than just rapping now.

Baby also spoke about how the listening habits of listeners have changed throughout the years, resulting in him cutting the album down in terms of songs in comparison to his previous albums, My Turn (20 songs), The Voice of the Heroes (18 songs), and It's Only Me (23 songs). When asked about it, Baby said:

I definitely feel like that. I think the attention span of the younger generation is not as long because everything is so short-lived. It’s like TikTok, YouTube, everything be kind of short now. So I feel like the attention span for music be different nowadays. I just don't want to make songs too long, but I still see [comments like], “Damn, these songs should be longer.” So it’s just different crowds. Some people love it, some people don't like it.

== Release and promotion ==
On June 26, 2024, while Young Thug was incarcerated, a post from his Twitter account came out that said: "whateva wham say goes". Following his release from jail, he posted on November 3: "Wham let’s drop one on these rats peter". Shortly after the post, billboards reading "Whatever Wham Says Goes" began to appear throughout Los Angeles, California. On November 11, Lil Baby was seen with Young Thug, Future, and Travis Scott in a recording studio. Five days later, Baby revealed that he got 21 Savage's "hardest verse ever". On November 20, he shared a partial tracklist of the album, teasing several features. On the same day, he took to social media to flex his $2.6 million custom jewelry that said "WHAM" in reference to the album's title. Baby officially announced the release of the album and shared its pre-save link. On December 21, he shared the album's official artwork and tracklist. On December 31, Baby shared the album's official trailer before releasing a live performance of "Streets Colder" on the 4 Shooters Only YouTube channel on January 1, 2025.

Upon the release of the album, Baby released a music video for the album's third track, "F U 2X". On January 6, 2025, Baby released a music video for the album's sixth track: "By Myself", which features Rod Wave and Rylo Rodriguez.

On January 7, Lil Baby performed the song "I Promise" on The Tonight Show, and released a deluxe version of WHAM. The deluxe version, which features four new tracks, was made available for purchase on the Motown website, before being released to streaming services on January 10.

== Critical reception ==
Professional ratings
Aggregate scores
Source	Rating
Metacritic	55/100
Review scores
Source	Rating
AllMusic	2/5 stars
Clash	8/10
NME	3/5 stars
RapReviews	6.5/10

According to the review aggregator Metacritic, WHAM received "mixed or average reviews" based on a weighted average score of 55 out of 100 from 4 critic scores. In a negative review, an AllMusic writer called Lil Baby's flows and beat selection "laughably generic", and said that the guest appearances failed to "save WHAM from mediocrity". Writing for RapReviews, Steve "Flash" Juon described the album as "the definition of 'it’s fine'".

In a positive review, Clash's Robin Murray wrote that the record "distils Lil Baby’s potency down to a thick, unrelenting elixir". Murray continued that on the album, Baby is "continually switching up flows" and that "his trap-leaning sonic thirst has rarely been so unremittingly effective". Murray concluded that the album "feels both eclectic and uniquely defined". Kyann-Sian Williams of NME praised its production, but said that overall, the album was "nothing to write home about."

== Commercial performance ==
WHAM debuted atop the US Billboard 200 during the chart week dated January 18, 2025, earning 140,000 album-equivalent units (including 50,000 pure album sales) in its first week of availability in the United States. The album earned a total of 119.77 million official streams for its tracks. It is Lil Baby's fourth US number-one album.

== Track listing ==
WHAM track listing
No.	Title	Writer(s)	Producer(s)	Length
1.	"Listen Up"	Dominique Jones; Nicholas Lee; Aaron Cheung; London Holmes	Nick Lee; Aaron Paris; London on da Track	2:35
2.	"Dum, Dumb, and Dumber" (with Young Thug and Future)	Jones; Jeffery Williams; Nayvadius Wilburn; Wesley Glass; Lucas DePante	Wheezy; Juke Wong	3:47
3.	"F U 2X"	Jones; Hampton Sallee III	DJ Champ	1:57
4.	"I Promise"	Jones; W. Glass; Joshua Luellen; Colin Franken; Joshua Goldenberg	Wheezy; Southside; Frankie Bash; Fizzle	3:03
5.	"Redbone" (featuring GloRilla)	Jones; Gloria Woods; Zeus Negrete; Leon Lightfoot III; Thomas Crimeni	King LeeBoy; T9C	2:12
6.	"By Myself" (with Rylo Rodriguez featuring Rod Wave)	Jones; Ryan Adams; Rodarius Green; Dwan Avery; Corey Moon; William Keating; Phil Cronin	Krazy Mob; DJ Moon; Williskeating; Phil Cronin	3:17
7.	"Due 4a Win"	Jones; Negrete; Aaron Gilfenbain; Jonathan Gabor; Suren Harybian; Emil Videnski; Nikita Spiridonov	Hurtboy AG; BeatsAintFree JG; That Boy Daymon; Emildollaz; Elementry	2:06
8.	"Stiff Gang"	Jones; W. Glass; Luellen; DePante	Wheezy; Southside; Juke Wong	2:51
9.	"So Sorry"	Jones; Avery; Bryson March; Oritseniraro Bemigho-Amorighoye	Krazy Mob; OB Mus1c	3:20
10.	"Stuff" (featuring Travis Scott)	Jones; Jacques Webster II; W. Glass; DePante; Goldenberg	Wheezy; Fizzle; Juke Wong	3:00
11.	"Say Twin"	Jones; Negrete; Tevin Blands	BeatzByTaz	2:45
12.	"Free Promo"	Jones; Negrete; Marko Andrej; Peter Gogola	Andyr; Getro	3:00
13.	"Outfit" (with 21 Savage)	Jones; Shéyaa Abraham-Joseph; Negrete; Mateen Niknam; Ethan Hayes; Nikita Murenets; Joshua Taylor	AyoPeeb; Haze; Splited Stupid; Josh Taylor	2:57
14.	"Drugs Talkin"	Jones; Negrete; Dylan Cleary-Krell; Jayden Christodoulou	Negrete; Dez Wright; 9jay	2:15
15.	"Streets Colder"	Jones; Avery; March; Golenduhin Alekseevich	Krazy Mob; BlayzeBeats	2:07
Total length:				41:12

Extended Version additional track listing
No.	Title	Writer(s)	Producer(s)	Length
16.	"99" (with Future)	Jones; Wilburn; W. Glass; Cleary-Krell; Christodoulou; Justin Glass	Wheezy; Dez Wright; 9jay; Baby Tsunami	1:52
17.	"Idol"	Jones; Negrete; Jacob Sclaver; Luis Prato; Deleon Gray II; Alexander Sekula	Juko; EZ Money; 2teflon; Lulescu	1:48
18.	"Running This Shit"	Jones; W. Glass; Dwayne Richardson	Wheezy; D. Rich	2:23
19.	"My Shawty"	Jones; James Maddocks; Joe Stanley; J. Glass	Maddocks; Stanley; Baby Tsunami	2:32
Total length:				49:47

== Personnel ==
=== Vocals ===
- Lil Baby – vocals
- Young Thug – vocals (track 2)
- Future – vocals (tracks 2, 16)
- GloRilla – vocals (track 5)
- Rylo Rodriguez – vocals (track 6)
- Rod Wave – vocals (track 6)
- Travis Scott – vocals (track 10)
- 21 Savage – vocals (track 13)

=== Technical ===
- Bainz – mixing (tracks 1–14), immersive mix engineering (all tracks), engineering (2, 9, 11)
- Jenso "JP" Plymouth – mixing (track 4)
- Jess Jackson – mixing (track 5)
- Patrizio "Teezio" Pigliapoco – mixing (tracks 6, 9)
- Jeffrey Williams – mixing (track 11)
- Zeus Negrete – engineering (all tracks), co-mixing (tracks 2–15)
- Eric Manco – engineering (tracks 2, 10)
- Mattazik Muzik – engineering (tracks 3–5, 7, 12)
- Richard D. Berry – engineering (tracks 6, 12)
- Isaiah "Ibmixing" Brown – engineering (track 13)

== Charts ==
=== Weekly charts ===
Weekly chart performance for WHAM
Chart (2025)	Peak position
Australian Albums (ARIA)	42
Australian Hip Hop/R&B Albums (ARIA)	8
Austrian Albums (Ö3 Austria)	9
Belgian Albums (Ultratop Flanders)	54
Belgian Albums (Ultratop Wallonia)	124
Canadian Albums (Billboard)	8
Danish Albums (Hitlisten)	27
Dutch Albums (Album Top 100)	17
Finnish Albums (Suomen virallinen lista)	34
French Albums (SNEP)	67
German Albums (Offizielle Top 100)	19
Hungarian Albums (MAHASZ)	14
Irish Albums (Official Charts)	27
Italian Albums (FIMI)	44
Lithuanian Albums (AGATA)	29
New Zealand Albums (RMNZ)	21
Norwegian Albums (VG-lista)	14
Polish Albums (ZPAV)	79
Swedish Albums (Sverigetopplistan)	51
Swiss Albums (Schweizer Hitparade)	4
UK Albums (Official Charts)	12
US Billboard 200	1
US Top R&B/Hip-Hop Albums (Billboard)	1

=== Year-end charts ===
Year-end chart performance for WHAM
Chart (2025)	Position
US Billboard 200	86
US Top R&B/Hip-Hop Albums (Billboard)	28
