= Rich Kidz =

American hip-hop group from Georgia

- Origin: Atlanta, Georgia, U.S.
- Genres: Hip-hop; R&B; pop
- Years active: 2008–present
- Labels: RK4L; CosaNostra; Columbia; Grand Hustle
- Members: Skooly; Huncho Kae; CosaNostra Kidd; CosaNostra Yayo; RK Sabo aka Sayy; RK London aka London on da Track; RK Sapp; Major Flav; Thr33 K
- Past members: Jose Guapo; Shad da God; Baby Charles

Rich Kidz (formerly known as Rich Kids) is an American hip-hop group from Atlanta, Georgia, formed in 2008. In 2012, they were signed to Columbia Records.

== Departure ==
Jose Guapo left the group to pursue a solo career after reports of mismanagement at Grand Hustle Records. Shad da God, formerly known as Rich Kid Shawty, is the cousin of T.I. Skooly, while still a part of Rich Kidz, went on to pursue a solo career. Skooly has produced tracks throughout Atlanta and is signed to 2 Chainz's label The Real University.

== Discography ==
=== Extended plays ===
- 2009: Money Swag
- 2014: Y.A.R.S
- 2015: The Blacc Jon Gotti (Skooly)
- 2015: I Want Them Millions (Huncho Kae)
- 2015: Straight off the Porch (CosaNostra Kidd)
- 2016: CCM Yayo (CosaNostra Yayo)
- 2016: Trench Gotti (Skooly)
- 2016: Fucc the Middle Man (CosaNostra Kidd)
- 2016: Misunderstood (CosaNostra Yayo)
- 2016: King Cosa (Skooly)
- 2016: Prince Cosa (CosaNostra Yayo)
- 2017: Born to Lose Built to Win (CosaNostra Yayo)
- 2017: Young Direct Deposit (CosaNostra Kidd)
- 2018: Don't You Ever Forget Me (Skooly)

=== Albums ===
- 2017: Baccwards Feelings (Skooly)
- 2020: Nobody Likes Me (Skooly)

=== Mixtapes ===
Title	Album details
Money Swag	Released: July 6, 2009; Format: Digital download
24/7	Released: December 11, 2009; Format: Digital download
Straight Like That	Released: November 26, 2010; Format: Digital download
Straight Like That 2	Released: April 28, 2011; Format: Digital download
Everybody Eat Bread	Released: February 7, 2012; Format: Digital download
Straight Like That 3	Released: November 16, 2012; Format: Digital download
A Westside Story	Released: November 19, 2013; Format: Digital download
RapN & SangN	Released: March 1, 2016; Format: Digital download

=== Main-artist singles ===
Year	Song	U.S. Hot 100	U.S. R&B	U.S. Rap	Certifications	Album
2009	"My Partna Dem" feat. Young Dro	—	77	—		Money Swag
2009	"Wassup"	—	115	—		Money Swag
2009	"My Partna Dem" (remix) feat. Lil Scrappy & Ludacris	—	—	—		24/7
2010	"I See You"	—	101	—		Non-album single
2012	"Nobody"	—	—	—		Everybody Eat Bread
2012	"Kool On The Low"	—	—	—		Straight Like That 3
2014	"Sum 2 Do"	—	—	—		Non-album single
