= Skooly =

American rapper (born 1994)

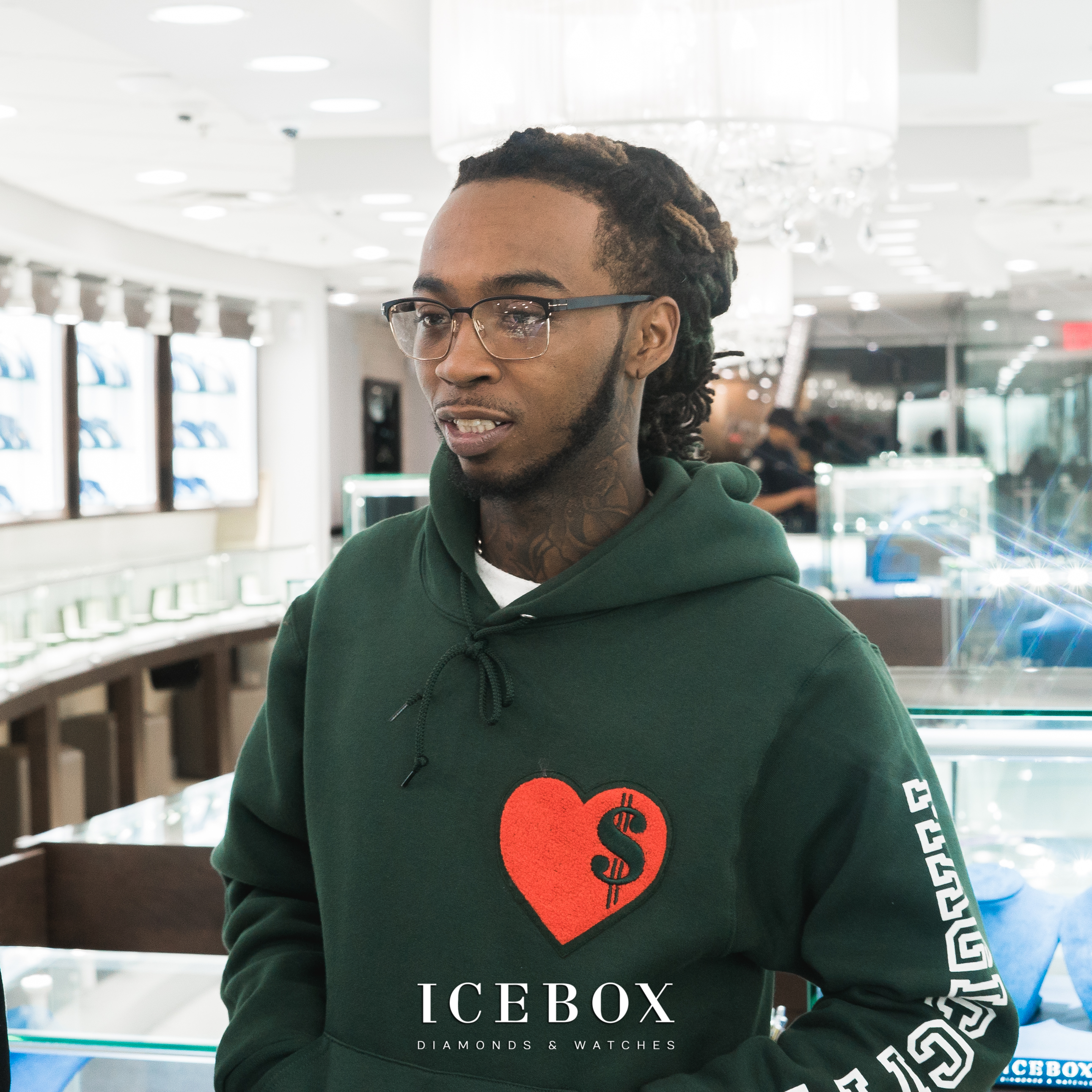
- Skooly in 2018

Background information
- Born: Kazarion Fowler; July 30, 1994 (age 31); Atlanta, Georgia, U.S.
- Genres: Hip-hop
- Occupations: Rapper
- Years active: 2008–present
- Labels: Atlantic; T.R.U.; Columbia
- Member of: Rich Kidz

Kazarion Fowler (born July 30, 1994), known professionally as Skooly, is an American rapper and a founding member of Atlanta-based rap group Rich Kidz. Branching off from Rich Kidz to pursue a solo career in 2015, Skooly has since released several solo projects. Skooly's recent releases have been under 2 Chainz' label T.R.U., starting with Skooly's label-debut album Baccwardfeelings in 2017.

== Early career ==
Skooly began his rap career when he was 14, co-founding collective Rich Kidz alongside Kaelub Denson aka Huncho Kae in 2008. Rich Kidz first mixtape, Money Swag, was released in 2009 via digital download. After releasing several mixtapes, Rich Kidz was signed to Columbia Records in 2012. After releasing music with Rich Kidz and Columbia in the early 2010s, Skooly released his first solo mixtape The Blacc Jon Gotti in 2015.

== T.R.U. & 2 Chainz ==
Also in 2015, Skooly signed to 2 Chainz' label T.R.U. Immediately after announcing T.R.U., or The Real University, 2 Chainz released his mixtape Tru Jack City, upon which Skooly was heavily featured. Skooly continued to release solo mixtapes in 2016 with Trench Gotti and King Cosa. In 2017, he released his debut album BAcCWArdFeELiNgS, which featured 2 Chainz, Young Thug, and Kidd. Skooly's most recent release came as an EP, Don't You Ever Forget Me, released in February 2018, with just one feature – 2 Chainz. He released his second album, Nobody Likes Me, in May 2020.

== Discography ==
Solo projects
Release date	Title	Project format
2014	Situations	Single
2015	The Blacc Jon Gotti	Mixtape
2016	Trench Gotti	Mixtape
2016	King Cosa	Mixtape
2017	BAcCWArdFeELiNgS	Album
2018	Don't You Ever Forget Me	EP
2018	Don't You Ever Forget Me 2	Mixtape
2018	Don't You Ever Forget Me 3	Album
2020	Nobody Likes Me	Album
2020	The Boy With the Bars	Mixtape

Co-projects
Release date	Title	Album artist	Project format
2009	Money Swag	Rich Kidz	Digital download
2010	24/7	Rich Kidz	Digital download
2011	Straight Like That	Rich Kidz	Digital download
2011	#StraightLikeThat2	Rich Kidz	Digital download
2012	Everybody Eat Bread	Rich Kidz	Digital download
2012	Straight Like That 3	Rich Kidz	Digital download
2013	Whole Team Ball (The Compilation)	Rich Kidz	Digital download
2013	A Westside Story	Rich Kidz	Digital download
2014	Y.A.R.S	Rich Kidz	Digital download
2016	Rapn & Sangn	Rich Kidz	Digital download
