= List of Billboard Rhythmic number-one songs of the 2010s =

The Rhythmic chart (concurrently referred to as Rhythmic Songs since June 2009) debuted in Billboard Magazine in the issue dated October 3, 1992, as the Top 40/Rhythm-Crossover chart. Weekly rankings are "compiled from a national sample of airplay" as measured by Nielsen BDS monitoring rhythmic radio stations in the United States continuously.

Below is the list of songs to reach number one on the Rhythmic chart during the 2010s.

== Number-one rhythmic hits of the 2010s ==
Key

↓↑ – Song's run at number one was non-consecutive
† – Number-one rhythmic song of the year

Reached number one	Song	Artist(s)	Weeks at number one
2010
December 5, 2009	"Empire State of Mind"	Jay-Z and Alicia Keys	7
January 23	"Replay"	Iyaz	3
February 13	"BedRock"	Young Money featuring Lloyd	7
April 3	"Nothin' on You" ↓↑†	B.o.B featuring Bruno Mars	7
May 1	"Rude Boy"	Rihanna	2
June 5	"OMG"	Usher featuring will.i.am	7
July 24	"Find Your Love"	Drake	3
August 14	"Love the Way You Lie"	Eminem featuring Rihanna	7
October 2	"DJ Got Us Fallin' in Love"	Usher featuring Pitbull	4
October 30	"Bottoms Up"	Trey Songz featuring Nicki Minaj	1
November 6	"Like a G6"	Far East Movement featuring Dev & The Cataracs	3
November 27	"Just a Dream"	Nelly	3
December 18	"Only Girl (In the World)"	Rihanna	1
December 25	"What's My Name"	Rihanna featuring Drake	9
2011
February 26	"Black & Yellow"	Wiz Khalifa	1
March 5	"Grenade"	Bruno Mars	1
March 12	"Down on Me"	Jeremih featuring 50 Cent	8
May 7	"Look at Me Now"	Chris Brown featuring Lil' Wayne and Busta Rhymes	1
May 14	"E.T."	Katy Perry featuring Kanye West	4
June 11	"The Show Goes On"	Lupe Fiasco	1
June 18	"Give Me Everything"†	Pitbull featuring Ne-Yo, Afrojack and Nayer	7
August 6	"Super Bass"	Nicki Minaj	1
August 13	"How to Love" ↓↑	Lil' Wayne	5
August 20	"Party Rock Anthem"	LMFAO featuring Lauren Bennett and GoonRock	2
October 1	"Lighters"	Bad Meets Evil featuring Bruno Mars	4
October 29	"Headlines"	Drake	4
November 26	"We Found Love" ↓↑	Rihanna featuring Calvin Harris	9
December 31	"Work Out"	J. Cole	1
2012
February 4	"Good Feeling"	Flo Rida	4
March 3	Young, Wild & Free" ↓↑	Snoop Dogg & Wiz Khalifa featuring Bruno Mars	3
March 10	"The Motto"†	Drake featuring Lil Wayne	2
April 7	"Take Care"	Drake featuring Rihanna	7
May 26	"Wild Ones"	Flo Rida featuring Sia	2
June 9	"Drank in My Cup"	Kirko Bangz	4
July 7	"Where Have You Been"	Rihanna	9
September 8	"Mercy"	Kanye West featuring Big Sean, Pusha T and 2 Chainz	1
September 15	"Whistle"	Flo Rida	4
October 13	"2 Reasons"	Trey Songz featuring T.I.	1
October 20	"As Long as You Love Me"	Justin Bieber featuring Big Sean	3
November 10	"Let Me Love You (Until You Learn to Love Yourself)"	Ne-Yo	3
December 1	"Diamonds"	Rihanna	10
2013
February 9	"Locked Out of Heaven"	Bruno Mars	1
February 16	"Thrift Shop"	Macklemore & Ryan Lewis featuring Wanz	8
April 13	"Suit & Tie"	Justin Timberlake featuring Jay-Z	2
April 27	"Started from the Bottom"	Drake	3
May 18	"Can't Hold Us"	Macklemore & Ryan Lewis featuring Ray Dalton	6
June 29	"Mirrors"	Justin Timberlake	2
July 13	"Blurred Lines"†	Robin Thicke featuring Pharrell Williams and T.I.	10
September 21	"Holy Grail"	Jay-Z featuring Justin Timberlake	2
October 5	"Hold On, We're Going Home"	Drake featuring Majid Jordan	10
December 14	"The Monster"	Eminem featuring Rihanna	8
2014
February 8	"Show Me"	Kid Ink featuring Chris Brown	3
March 1	"Drunk in Love"	Beyoncé featuring Jay-Z	3
March 22	"Dark Horse"	Katy Perry featuring Juicy J	1
March 29	"Happy" ↓↑	Pharrell Williams	2
April 5	"Talk Dirty"	Jason Derulo featuring 2 Chainz	3
May 3	"All of Me"	John Legend	1
May 10	"Loyal"	Chris Brown featuring Lil Wayne and Too Short, French Montana or Tyga	2
May 24	"Na Na"	Trey Songz	1
May 31	"Turn Down for What"	DJ Snake featuring Lil Jon	2
June 14	"Fancy"	Iggy Azalea featuring Charli XCX	4
July 12	"Problem"	Ariana Grande featuring Iggy Azalea	3
August 2	"2 On"	Tinashe featuring Schoolboy Q	3
August 23	"Am I Wrong"	Nico & Vinz	2
September 6	"Don't Tell 'Em"†	Jeremih featuring YG	7
October 25	"Black Widow"	Iggy Azalea featuring Rita Ora	3
November 15	"New Flame"	Chris Brown featuring Usher and Rick Ross	1
November 22	"Touchin, Lovin"	Trey Songz featuring Nicki Minaj	4
December 20	"I Don't F**k with You"	Big Sean featuring E-40	1
December 27	"Tuesday"	ILoveMakonnen featuring Drake	1
2015
January 3	"Love Me Harder"	Ariana Grande featuring The Weeknd	5
February 7	"I Don't Mind"	Usher featuring Juicy J	1
February 14	"Uptown Funk"	Mark Ronson featuring Bruno Mars	5
March 21	"Time of Our Lives"	Pitbull featuring Ne-Yo	1
March 28	"Truffle Butter"	Nicki Minaj featuring Drake and Lil Wayne	1
April 4	"Somebody"	Natalie La Rose featuring Jeremih	4
May 2	"Earned It (Fifty Shades of Grey)"	The Weeknd	3
May 23	"Trap Queen"	Fetty Wap	2
June 6	"See You Again"	Wiz Khalifa featuring Charlie Puth	4
July 4	"Post to Be"	Omarion featuring Chris Brown and Jhené Aiko	1
July 11	"You Know You Like It"	DJ Snake and AlunaGeorge	2
July 25	"Hey Mama"	David Guetta featuring Nicki Minaj, Bebe Rexha and Afrojack	1
August 1	"Can't Feel My Face"†	The Weeknd	5
September 5	"Cheerleader (Felix Jaehn Remix)"	OMI	1
September 12	"My Way"	Fetty Wap featuring Monty	1
September 19	"The Hills"	The Weeknd	5
October 24	"Hotline Bling"	Drake	8
December 19	"Here"	Alessia Cara	2
2016
January 2	"White Iverson"	Post Malone	1
January 9	"Antidote"	Travis Scott	2
January 23	"Sorry"	Justin Bieber	2
February 6	"Jumpman"	Drake & Future	1
February 13	"In the Night"	The Weeknd	1
February 20	"Say It"	Tory Lanez	2
March 5	"Me, Myself & I"	G-Eazy and Bebe Rexha	2
March 19	"Work"	Rihanna featuring Drake	6
April 30	"Might Not"	Belly featuring The Weeknd	3
May 21	"Work from Home"	Fifth Harmony featuring Ty Dolla $ign	1
May 28	"One Dance"†	Drake featuring Wizkid and Kyla	6
July 9	"Don't Mind"	Kent Jones	3
July 30	"Needed Me"	Rihanna	2
August 13	"Controlla"	Drake featuring Popcaan	2
August 27	"For Free"	DJ Khaled featuring Drake	3
September 17	"Too Good"	Drake featuring Rihanna	6
October 29	"Broccoli"	DRAM featuring Lil Yachty	1
November 5	"Starboy"	The Weeknd featuring Daft Punk	6
December 17	"24K Magic"	Bruno Mars	1
December 24	"Black Beatles"	Rae Sremmurd featuring Gucci Mane	5
2017
January 28	"Fake Love"	Drake	4
February 25	"Bad Things"	Machine Gun Kelly & Camila Cabello	1
March 4	"Bounce Back" ↓↑	Big Sean	2
March 11	"Bad and Boujee"	Migos featuring Lil Uzi Vert	2
April 1	"Party Monster"	The Weeknd	1
April 8	"Goosebumps"	Travis Scott featuring Kendrick Lamar	1
April 15	"That's What I Like"	Bruno Mars	3
May 6	"ISpy" ↓↑	Kyle featuring Lil Yachty	2
May 13	"Shining"	DJ Khaled featuring Beyoncé and Jay-Z	1
May 27	"Passionfruit"	Drake	1
June 3	"Humble"	Kendrick Lamar	3
June 24	"Mask Off"	Future	1
July 1	"I'm the One"	DJ Khaled Featuring Justin Bieber, Quavo, Chance The Rapper & Lil Wayne	4
July 29	"Unforgettable"†	French Montana Featuring Swae Lee	1
August 5	"Wild Thoughts"	DJ Khaled featuring Rihanna and Bryson Tiller	8
September 30	"Loyalty"	Kendrick Lamar Featuring Rihanna	1
October 7	"Bodak Yellow"	Cardi B	4
November 4	"Rake It Up"	Yo Gotti Featuring Nicki Minaj	1
November 11	"Rockstar" ↓↑	Post Malone featuring 21 Savage	6
December 16	"No Limit"	G-Eazy featuring ASAP Rocky and Cardi B	2
December 30	"Love"	Kendrick Lamar featuring Zacari	1
2018
January 3	"Havana"	Camila Cabello featuring Young Thug	3
January 20	"I Get the Bag"	Gucci Mane featuring Migos	1
February 3	"Sky Walker"	Miguel featuring Travis Scott	1
February 10	"Lemon"	N.E.R.D featuring Rihanna	1
February 17	"Finesse" (remix)	Bruno Mars featuring Cardi B	2
March 3	"God's Plan"†	Drake	6
April 14	"Pray for Me"	The Weeknd featuring Kendrick Lamar	2
April 28	"Psycho"	Post Malone featuring Ty Dolla Sign	4
May 26	"Nice for What"	Drake	6
July 7	"Be Careful"	Cardi B	1
July 14	"I Like It"	Cardi B featuring Bad Bunny and J Balvin	4
August 11	"In My Feelings"	Drake	4
September 8	"Taste"	Tyga featuring Offset	4
October 6	"No Brainer"	DJ Khaled featuring Justin Bieber, Quavo, and Chance the Rapper	1
October 13	"Lucid Dreams"	Juice Wrld	1
October 20	"Big Bank"	YG featuring 2 Chainz, Big Sean and Nicki Minaj	1
October 27	"Sicko Mode"	Travis Scott	5
December 1	"Wake Up in the Sky"	Gucci Mane, Bruno Mars, Kodak Black	3
December 22	"Trip"	Ella Mai	1
December 29	"Mia"	Bad Bunny featuring Drake	2
2019
January 12	"Zeze"	Kodak Black featuring Travis Scott and Offset	1
January 19	"Sunflower"	Post Malone and Swae Lee	4
February 16	"Better"	Khalid	1
February 23	"Wow"†	Post Malone	5
March 30	"Going Bad"	Meek Mill featuring Drake	2
April 13	"Please Me"	Cardi B and Bruno Mars	1
April 20	"A Lot"	21 Savage featuring J. Cole	2
May 4	"Middle Child"	J. Cole	1
May 11	"Talk" ↓↑	Khalid	2
May 18	"Look Back at It"	A Boogie wit da Hoodie	1
May 25	"Old Town Road"	Lil Nas X	1
June 1	"Old Town Road" ↓↑	Lil Nas X featuring Billy Ray Cyrus	2
June 8	"Pure Water"	Mustard and Migos	2
July 6	"Act Up"	City Girls	1
July 13	"Wake Up"	Travis Scott featuring The Weeknd	1
July 20	"Close Friends"	Lil Baby	1
July 27	"Truth Hurts" ↓↑	Lizzo	3
August 3	"No Guidance" ↓↑	Chris Brown featuring Drake	4
August 31	"Money in the Grave"	Drake featuring Rick Ross	3
September 21	"Goodbyes"	Post Malone featuring Young Thug	1
September 28	"My Type"	Saweetie	2
October 19	"Ransom"	Lil Tecca	1
October 26	"Hot Girl Summer"	Megan Thee Stallion, Nicki Minaj & Ty Dolla $ign	1
November 2	"Panini"	Lil Nas X	1
November 16	"On Chill"	Wale featuring Jeremih	1
November 23	"Heat"	Chris Brown featuring Gunna	1
November 30	"Enemies"	Post Malone featuring DaBaby	2
December 14	"Highest in the Room"	Travis Scott	1
December 21	"Ballin’"↓↑	Mustard featuring Roddy Ricch	2
December 28	"Leave Em Alone"	Layton Greene, Lil Baby, City Girls & PnB Rock	3

== See also ==
- 2010s in music
- List of Billboard Hot 100 number-one singles of the 2010s
- List of artists who reached number one on the U.S. Rhythmic chart
