= Drip Too Hard =

2018 single by Lil Baby and Gunna

Single by Lil Baby and Gunna

from the album Drip Harder
- Released: September 12, 2018
- Recorded: 2018
- Genre: Trap
- Length: 2:25
- Label: YSL; Quality Control; Motown; Capitol
- Songwriters: Dominique Jones; Sergio Kitchens; Chandler A. Great
- Producer: Turbo

Lil Baby singles chronology
"Yes Indeed" (2018)	"Drip Too Hard" (2018)	"Geek'd" (2018)

Gunna singles chronology
"Need U" (2018)	"Drip Too Hard" (2018)	"Choosin" (2018)

Music video
- "Drip Too Hard" on YouTube

"Drip Too Hard" is a song by American rappers Lil Baby and Gunna, released by YSL Records, Quality Control Music, Motown and Capitol Records on September 12, 2018, as the lead single from their collaborative album Drip Harder (2018). It peaked at number four on the US Billboard Hot 100, becoming the highest-charting song for Gunna and the third highest-charting song for Lil Baby. The song was nominated for a Grammy at the 2020 Grammy Awards for Best Rap/Sung Performance. On September 12, 2022, the song was certified Diamond by the Recording Industry Association of America (RIAA), for selling over 10 million copies in the US, giving both artists their first Diamond certification.

== Production ==
"Drip Too Hard" was produced by American record producer Turbo, who also served as the executive producer on the duo's mixtape. The project debuted at number four on the US Billboard 200 chart, earning 129,809 album-equivalent units in its first week, including 6,228 in pure album sales and over 164 million streams Drip Harder.

== Critical reception ==
Pitchfork commented that "On “Drip Too Hard,” Lil Baby finds his melodic sweet spot on the hook only for Gunna to attempt to upstage him with smooth vocals that manage to keep his rapid delivery intact, all while tossing in a few boasts that are probably lies, but those are the best ones". UPROXX stated that the song is "built on their existing chemistry from years of association". Billboard named it fourth best song on the Drip Harder album, saying that "'Drip Too Hard' isn't Baby or Gunna's best song (that'd be 'Life Goes On'), but it does illustrate what makes their musical bromance special".

== Music video ==
The music video was released on YouTube on October 5, 2018. The video was directed by Spike Jordan.

== Charts ==
=== Weekly charts ===
Weekly chart performance
Chart (2018–2019)	Peak position
Belgium (Ultratip Bubbling Under Flanders)	21
Canada Hot 100 (Billboard)	10
Greece International Digital Singles (IFPI)	27
Ireland (IRMA)	50
Portugal (AFP)	1
Sweden (Sverigetopplistan)	86
Switzerland (Schweizer Hitparade)	87
UK Singles (Official Charts)	28
US Billboard Hot 100	4
US Hot R&B/Hip-Hop Songs (Billboard)	3
US Hot Rap Songs (Billboard)	1
US Rhythmic Airplay (Billboard)	4
US Rolling Stone Top 100	64

=== Year-end charts ===
Annual chart rankings
Chart (2018)	Position
US Hot R&B/Hip-Hop Songs (Billboard)	57
US Streaming Songs (Billboard)	65
Chart (2019)	Position
Canada (Canadian Hot 100)	60
US Billboard Hot 100	26
US Hot R&B/Hip-Hop Songs (Billboard)	16
US Rhythmic (Billboard)	27
US Rolling Stone Top 100	20

== Certifications ==
Region	Certification	Certified units/sales
Brazil (Pro-Música Brasil)	2× Platinum	80,000^{‡}
Canada (Music Canada)	4× Platinum	320,000^{‡}
Denmark (IFPI Danmark)	Platinum	90,000^{‡}
Germany (BVMI)	Gold	200,000^{‡}
Italy (FIMI)	Platinum	100,000^{‡}
New Zealand (RMNZ)	3× Platinum	90,000^{‡}
Poland (ZPAV)	Gold	25,000^{‡}
Portugal (AFP)	Platinum	10,000^{‡}
Spain (Promusicae)	Gold	30,000^{‡}
United Kingdom (BPI)	2× Platinum	1,200,000^{‡}
United States (RIAA)	Diamond	10,000,000^{‡}
Streaming
Greece (IFPI Greece)	Platinum	2,000,000^{†}
^{‡} Sales+streaming figures based on certification alone.^{†} Streaming-only figures based on certification alone.
