= Control the Streets, Volume 2 =

Compilation album by Quality Control
- Released: August 16, 2019
- Recorded: 2018–2019
- Genre: Hip hop; Trap
- Length: 105:23
- Label: Quality Control; Motown
- Producer: AyoLump; Ayoza; Bassline Fanaticz; Ben Billions; Buddah Bless; Cardiak; Cicero; Cubeatz; DaySix; Dez Wright; DJ Durel; DY; Earl on the Beat; Easy Money Caleb; Fabio Aguilar; Frankie Bash; French Montana; Helluva; Hitmaka; Joseph DaVinci; Keanu Beats; LNK; Mario Petersen; Metro Boomin; Mike Almighty; Murda Beatz; Mustard; MVA Beats; Narquise; Official; OG Parker; Palazzo Beats; Paul Cabbin; Pi'erre Bourne; Pyrex; Quavo; Quay Global; Rodney Jerkins; SkipOnDaBeat; Smash David; Snapz; Southside; Tay Keith; Tee Romano; Thank You Fizzle; Twysted Genius; Wheezy; Yung Tago; Zoe Runna

Quality Control chronology
Control the Streets, Volume 1 (2017)	Control the Streets, Volume 2 (2019)

Singles from Quality Control: Control the Streets Volume 2
- 1. "Baby" / "Come On" Released: July 17, 2019; 2. "Intro" / "Longtime" Released: August 1, 2019

Quality Control: Control the Streets, Volume 2 is a compilation album released by American record label Quality Control. The album was released on August 16, 2019, by Quality Control Music and Motown. The album includes contributions from Quality Control artists Migos, Lil Yachty, Lil Baby, Marlo, DJ Durel, Migo Domingo, Mango Foo, YRN Lingo, YRN Murk, Duke Deuce, Dayytona Foxx, Kollision, 24Heavy, Street Bud, Jordan Hollywood, Stefflon Don, Layton Greene, City Girls and Renni Rucci. Other guest appearances include Gucci Mane, DaBaby, Tee Grizzley, Megan Thee Stallion, Gunna, Playboi Carti, Meek Mill, Travis Scott, Mustard, Young Thug, PnB Rock, Rylo Rodriguez, French Montana, Saweetie and Tay Keith.

== Music and lyrics ==
On “Intro”, Gucci Mane, Lil Yachty and Migos "effortlessly trade bars" and "encapsulate everything Quality Control is about." The album reflects much of rap "moving to funkier pastures after a decade of monolithic trap beats" such as "Like That", where Mustard "chops up some New Orleans bounce" with Miami's City Girls, the U.K.’s Stefflon Don and South Carolina’s Renni Rucci.

== Critical reception ==
Professional ratings
Aggregate scores
Source	Rating
Metacritic	58/100
Review scores
Source	Rating
HiphopDX	3.5/5
Pitchfork	5.9/10
Rolling Stone	2.5/5 stars
AllMusic	2.5/5 stars

Control the Streets, Volume 2 received mixed reviews from critics. At Metacritic, the album received an average score of 58 based on 5 reviews.

Christopher Weingarten of Spin wrote that "it’s a mostly satisfying chance to hear the sound of contemporary rap evolving in real time." Cherise Johnson of HipHopDX wrote that "the 36-song project feels more like Quality Control on shuffle than a compilation — which is a good thing but misses the mark on creating an album in the purest sense."

On the other hand, Sheldon Pearce of Pitchfork wrote that QC artists' raps are "completely unimaginative" and featuring artists such as Megan Thee Stallion, Tee Grizzley and Gucci Mane outshine them. Danny Schwartz of Rolling Stone wrote that "while the QC headliners spend much of Vol. 2 spinning their wheels, the undercards provide the more compelling draw and show occasional flashes of brilliance." Fred Thomas of AllMusic wrote that "Vol. 2 of the series falls remarkably short of the high bar set by both the all star list of contributors and the victorious feel of its predecessor."

== Commercial performance ==
Control the Streets, Volume 2 debuted at number three on the US Billboard 200 with 63,000 album-equivalent units, becoming Quality Control's second US top 10 album.

== Track listing ==
Adapted from HotNewHipHop, and credits adapted from Tidal.

No.	Title	Writer(s)	Producer(s)	Length
1.	"Intro" (with Migos and Lil Yachty featuring Gucci Mane)	Kiari Cephus; Kirshnik Ball; Quavious Marshall; Miles McCollum; Radric Davis; Daryl McPherson	DJ Durel	3:35
2.	"Once Again" (with Lil Yachty featuring Tee Grizzley)	McCollum; Terry Wallace, Jr.; Martin McCurtis	Helluva	2:50
3.	"Baby" (with Lil Baby and DaBaby)	Dominique Jones; Jonathan Kirk; Wesley Glass	Wheezy	2:22
4.	"What It Is" (with Offset)	Cephus; Kendrick Cannady	Pyrex; DaySix	2:27
5.	"Frosted Flakes" (with Migos)	Marshall; Ball; Cephus; Earl Bynum; Tyron Douglas; Joshua Parker	Buddah Bless; Earl on the Beat; OG Parker	4:18
6.	"Pastor" (with Quavo and City Girls featuring Megan Thee Stallion)	Marshall; Jatavia Johnson; Caresha Brownlee; Megan Pete; Shane Lindstrom	Murda Beatz	2:40
7.	"I Suppose" (with Takeoff)	Ball; McPherson; Kevin Gomringer; Tim Gomringer	DJ Durel; Cubeatz	2:31
8.	"Back On" (with Lil Baby)	Jones; Chris Rosser	Quay Global	2:25
9.	"Pink Toes" (with Offset and DaBaby featuring Gunna)	Cephus; Kirk; Sergio Kitchens; Leland Wayne; Joshua Luellen	Metro Boomin; Southside; Cubeatz	3:37
10.	"Dead Man Walking" (with Lil Yachty)	McCollum; Douglas	Buddah Bless	2:01
11.	"100 Racks" (with Offset featuring Playboi Carti)	Cephus; Jordan Carter; Wayne; Jordan Jenks	Metro Boomin; Pi'erre Bourne	2:37
12.	"Double Trouble" (with Quavo featuring Meek Mill)	Marshall; Robert Williams; Parker; Terrence Williams; Dylan Cleary-Krell	OG Parker; Tee Romano; Dez Wright	2:56
13.	"Bless Em" (with Takeoff featuring Travis Scott)	Ball; Jacques Webster II; Dwan Avery	DY; Cicero	3:00
14.	"Like That" (with City Girls and Stefflon Don featuring Renni Rucci and Mustard)	Leslie Wakefield; Johnson; Brownlee; Stephanie Allen; Courtney Rene; Dijon McFarlane	Mustard; Official	3:39
15.	"Big Rocks" (with Offset featuring Young Thug)	Cephus; Jeffery Williams; Glass	Wheezy; Thank You Fizzle; Frankie Bash	2:24
16.	"Virgil" (with Quavo)	Marshall; McPherson	DJ Durel; Cubeatz	2:50
17.	"Magellanic" (with Takeoff)	Ball; McPherson	DJ Durel	2:19
18.	"Leave Em Alone" (with Layton Greene featuring Lil Baby, City Girls and PnB Rock)	Layton Greene; Jones; Rakim Allen; Rodney Jerkins; Ciara Harris; Curtis Jackson; LaShawn Daniels; Christian Ward; Lerron Carson; Carl McCormick; Raquelle Anteola	Cardiak; Hitmaka; Paul Cabbin^{[a]}; Rodney Jerkins^{[a]}	2:51
19.	"Ride" (with Lil Baby featuring Rylo Rodriguez and 24Heavy)	Jones; Ryan Adams; Ricky Hill	Yung Tago	3:54
20.	"Wiggle It" (performed by French Montana featuring City Girls)	Karim Kharbouch; Brownlee; Johnson; Raynford Humphrey; Benjamin Diehl; Gamal Lewis; Hugh Brankin; John Reid; Ross Campbell; Graham Wilson	French Montana; Ben Billions	2:51
21.	"Stripper Bowl" (with Migos)	Marshall; Ball; Cephus; McPherson	Quavo; Buddah Bless	3:22
22.	"Come On" (with City Girls and Saweetie featuring DJ Durel)	Johnson; Brownlee; Diamonté Harper; McPherson; K. Gomringer; T. Gomringer; Teiron Robinson; Kinta Cox	DJ Durel; Cubeatz	3:08
23.	"Soakin Wet" (with Marlo and Offset featuring City Girls)	Rudolph Johnson; Cephus; Cox	Hitmaka; OG Parker; Tee Romano	2:57
24.	"Longtime" (with 24Heavy featuring Young Thug)	Mario Petersen; Leon Krol; Vladislav Mokhin; Pascal Punz; Hill; Williams	MVA Beats; Palazzo Beats; LNK; Petersen	3:01
25.	"Yeh" (with Duke Deuce)	Patavious Isom	Ayoza	3:06
26.	"Menace 2" (with Migos and Lil Yachty)	Cephus; Marshall; McCollum; Bynum	Earl on the Beat	2:24
27.	"Big Bag" (with Marlo)	Johnson	Twysted Genius	2:55
28.	"Grab A..." (with Duke Deuce featuring Tay Keith)	Isom; Brytavious Chambers	Tay Keith	2:23
29.	"Killin' Time" (with Lil Yachty featuring Offset and Mango Foo)	McCollum; Cephus; Bynum	Earl on the Beat	2:12
30.	"Bait" (with Kollision)	Rodriquez Woods	Narquise; Easy Money Caleb; Zoe Runna; Mike Almighty; Joseph DaVinci	2:25
31.	"Shoulder" (with Dayytona Fox and YRN Lingo)	Ezekiel Davenport; David Southworth; Timothy Johnson III	AyoLump	1:52
32.	"Testament" (with Jordan Hollywood)	Jordan Gomez; Samuel Jimenez; Edgar Ferrera	Smash David; SkipOnDaBeat	3:43
33.	"Get Em In" (with Mango Foo and Offset)	Michael Millhouse; Cephus; Lindstrom	Murda Beatz	3:42
34.	"Murda" (with Domingo and Duke Deuce)	Dominic Spigner; Isom; Niles Groce; Keanu Torres; Fabio Aguilar	Snapz; Keanu Beats; Aguilar	3:43
35.	"Ain't Nuthin" (with Street Bud)	Spectacular Smith; Leon Smith; Joseph Smith; Marcus Cooper; James Scheffer; Corey Marhis; Derrick Baker; Diamond Smith	Bassline Fanaticz	2:57
36.	"Hit" (with YRN Murk)	Cannady	Pyrex	3:26
Total length:				105:23

Notes

- ^{^[a]} signifies a co-producer

Sample credits

- "Leave Em Alone" contains a sample and interpolation of "Can't Leave 'em Alone", written by Rodney Jerkins, Ciara Harris, Curtis Jackson, and LaShawn Daniels, as performed by Ciara.

== Charts ==
=== Weekly charts ===
Chart (2019)	Peak position
Belgian Albums (Ultratop Flanders)	106
Belgian Albums (Ultratop Wallonia)	134
Canadian Albums (Billboard)	5
Dutch Albums (Album Top 100)	33
French Albums (SNEP)	62
New Zealand Albums (RMNZ)	37
Swiss Albums (Schweizer Hitparade)	40
US Billboard 200	3
US Top R&B/Hip-Hop Albums (Billboard)	3

=== Year-end charts ===
Chart (2019)	Position
US Billboard 200	150
US Top R&B/Hip-Hop Albums (Billboard)	57
Chart (2020)	Position
US Billboard 200	115
US Top R&B/Hip-Hop Albums (Billboard)	76
