= Pure Cocaine =

2018 song by Lil Baby

Song by Lil Baby

from the album Street Gossip
- Released: November 30, 2018
- Length: 2:34
- Label: Quality Control; Motown; Capitol; Wolfpack
- Songwriters: Dominique Jones; Chris Rosser; Matthew Robinson
- Producers: Quay Global; Mattazik Muzik

Music video
- "Pure Cocaine" on YouTube

"Pure Cocaine" is a song by American rapper Lil Baby from his mixtape Street Gossip. It was produced by Quay Global and Mattazik Muzik.

== Critical reception ==
Marcus Blackwell of HipHopDX praised the song in his review of Street Gossip, writing, "As an artist, Lil Baby is at the peak of his powers on the standout record 'Pure Cocaine,' where his rapid-fire flows and melodic delivery highlight his skillset the most. "

== Music video ==
The official music video was released on March 8, 2019 and directed by Edgar Esteves. In it, Lil Baby abandons an old life of hustling, and severs ties with the kingpin as he gives him the rest of his dirty money. In the next scene, Baby enjoys his new success as a rapper, throwing a party in his mansion. He and the others are all dressed in white and the insides of the mansion are white as well, as a reference to cocaine. Lil Baby is surrounded by his crew and a bunch of women and is seen rapping in front of a pool, while exotic dancers appear around him performing tricks. The party ends when the kingpin suddenly arrives; an argument ensues and guns are soon drawn toward Baby as the video ends.

== Charts ==
Chart (2018–2019)	Peak position
Canada Hot 100 (Billboard)	56
US Billboard Hot 100	46
US Hot R&B/Hip-Hop Songs (Billboard)	20

Chart (2023)	Peak position
Canada Hot 100 (Billboard)	90

== Certifications ==
Region	Certification	Certified units/sales
Canada (Music Canada)	Platinum	80,000^{‡}
Denmark (IFPI Danmark)	Gold	45,000^{‡}
United Kingdom (BPI)	Gold	400,000^{‡}
United States (RIAA)	4× Platinum	4,000,000^{‡}
^{‡} Sales+streaming figures based on certification alone.
