= Touchdown (Lil Baby song) =

2024 single by Lil Baby

Single by Lil Baby
- Released: December 6, 2024
- Genre: Trap
- Length: 2:32
- Label: Quality Control; Motown
- Songwriters: Dominique Jones; Wesley Glass; Dylan Cleary-Krell; Jaden Christodoulou
- Producers: Wheezy; Dez Wright; 9jay

Lil Baby singles chronology
"Insecurities" (2024)	"Touchdown" (2024)	"Legends" (2025)

Music video
- "Touchdown" on YouTube

"Touchdown" is a single by American rapper Lil Baby, released on December 6, 2024. It was produced by Wheezy, Dez Wright and 9jay.

== Composition ==
The song contains a trap beat with rattling percussion and dramatic orchestral samples. At one point, Lil Baby criticizes rappers who use nail polish, calling himself a "real gangster" for not doing so.

== Critical reception ==
Zachary Horvath and Gabriel Bras Nevares of HotNewHipHop had positive reactions to the song. The former stated, "It's a simple record in terms of what of it's trying to do, but he just sounds livelier on the dark Wheezy production. It could take some a while to come back around, but this a solid return to form for Lil Baby, all things considered."; The latter commented, "Compared to his more mellow and expressive far, this is a pretty menacing display that might point towards his presumed upcoming album's direction. It's not the most new thing in the world, but it does a solid job of locking you into its verses." Armon Sadler of Vibe gave a negative review, writing "'Touchdown' starts off promising as he kind of uses a new flow and the production is better than most of what he has used recently. Unfortunately, that quickly dies down because he doesn't say anything interesting and the chorus is bad. There's a nice moment where the beat drops out and he doubles up his flow, but for the most part this record is underwhelming. At this point, the Atlanta rapper sounds way more interesting paired with other acts so he can show off his rapping ability. Any time he has to handle verses and a chorus on his own, it just does not hit like it used to."

== Music video ==
The music video was directed by Gerard Victor and released alongside the single. It sees Lil Baby playing many football-related roles, including a quarterback, commentator and coach and being interviewed after the game. He wears a football uniform as he raps, as well as a chain with the Atlanta Falcons logo and the title of his album WHAM.

== Charts ==
Chart performance for "Touchdown"
Chart (2024)	Peak position
US Bubbling Under Hot 100 (Billboard)	11
US Hot R&B/Hip-Hop Songs (Billboard)	39
