= Bankroll Freddie =

American rapper

- Born: Freddie Demarus Gladney III; October 15, 1994 (age 31); Helena, Arkansas, U.S.
- Genres: Southern hip hop; gangsta rap; trap
- Occupations: Rapper; songwriter
- Years active: 2017–2022
- Labels: Motown; Quality Control
- Children: 5
- Criminal information
- Status: Incarcerated
- Convictions: Conspiracy to distribute and possess with intent to distribute marijuana; Possession with intent to distribute marijuana; Possession of a firearm in furtherance of a drug trafficking crime; Using a telephone in furtherance of a drug trafficking crime
- Penalty: 12 1/2 years in prison

Details
- Date apprehended: April 14, 2022
- Imprisoned at: FCI Yazoo City Low

Freddie Demarus Gladney III, known professionally as Bankroll Freddie, is an American rapper from Helena, Arkansas. He is signed to Quality Control Music and Motown Records.

== Early life ==
Gladney was born in Helena, Arkansas. His mom moved with him to Conway, Arkansas after his cousin was shot and killed in 2009. Gladney graduated from Conway High School in 2013.

== Career ==
Gladney started his music career in 2017, releasing the freestyle Lil Baby. As part of the #ActUpChallenge, he created a freestyle over "Act Up," a song by City Girls under the label Quality Control. A short time later, Quality Control's CEO Pierre "P" Thomas reposted the freestyle on Instagram, and then invited Gladney to Los Angeles to meet.

Gladney released a 2019 single, "Drip Like This." He released the mixtape Saved by the Bales in July 2019, and Quality Control later released a remix of a track on the album, titled Drip Like Dis and featuring Young Dolph and Lil Baby. After the single's success, he officially joined Quality Control's label. In November 2019, he released the single "Lil Mama" (featuring Renni Rucci).

In 2020, he released the album From Trap to Rap, featuring Moneybagg Yo, Lil Yachty, Young Dolph, Lil Baby, and Trapboy Freddy. He later created a remix of the album track "Rich Off Grass", featuring Young Dolph. In May 2020, he released the track "Quarantine Flow". He signed with Motown Records, and his first release under the label was the track "Add It Up", released on January 30, 2021, alongside an accompanying music video.

He released his second single in 2021, titled "Pop It" (featuring Megan Thee Stallion). The single was from his 2021 album, Big Bank, released by Quality Control and Motown. The 14-track album features EST Gee, 2 Chainz, Young Scooter, Megan Thee Stallion, PnB Rock, Young Dolph, BIG30 and Gucci Mane.

== Personal life ==
Gladney lives in Little Rock, Arkansas. He wears a diamond-encrusted ring on his pinkie, in the shape of the state of Arkansas. According to an interview he gave to VladTV, he has five children. In 2021, he appeared on an episode of WorldStarHipHop's Welcome to My Hood, visiting the neighborhood he grew up in at Helena-West Helena, Arkansas. In May 2021, it was reported that Gladney was shot; later that day, he posted "I'm good" on an Instagram story, which showed a wound under his chin.

=== Legal issues ===
It was announced on April 17, 2022, that Bankroll Freddie was arrested in Arkansas on drug and weapons charges after being pulled over for speeding. Freddie was allegedly in possession of 21 pounds of marijuana—which is banned in the state—171 grams of promethazine, and a firearm.

== Discography ==
=== Studio albums ===
Title	Album details	Peak chart positions
Title	Album details	US Heat.
Big Bank	Released: April 2, 2021; Label: Quality Control, Motown; Format: Digital download, streaming	2

=== Mixtapes ===
Title	Album details	Peak chart positions
Title	Album details	US Heat.
Saved by the Bales	Released: July 4, 2019; Label: BKM; Format: Digital download, streaming	—
From Trap to Rap	Released: January 17, 2020; Label: Quality Control; Format: Digital download, streaming	—
From Trap to Rap 2	Released: July 29, 2022; Label: Quality Control, Motown; Format: Digital download, streaming	6

=== Singles ===
- "Drip Like This" (2019)
- "Drip Like Dis (Remix)" (2019)
- "Rich Off Grass (Remix)" (2020)
- "Ran It Up" by Crenshaw Biggie (2020)
- "Quarantine Flow" (2020)
- "Spin" by Lil Quez (2020)
- "Bag A Lil Different" by Studieo, featuring Skooly (2020)
- "Trap Slow" on Zaystreet, by Young Scooter and Zaytoven (2020)
- "Tomorrow" by Doe B on Last Definition of a Trapper (2020)
- "Add It Up" (2021)
- "Pop It" (April 2, 2021) with Megan Thee Stallion
