= Legends (Quavo and Lil Baby song) =

2025 single by Quavo and Lil Baby

Single by Quavo and Lil Baby
- Released: April 11, 2025
- Genre: Trap
- Length: 3:01
- Label: Quality Control; Motown
- Songwriters: Quavious Marshall; Dominique Jones; Wesley Glass; Jacob Canady
- Producers: Wheezy; ATL Jacob

Quavo singles chronology
"No Matter What" (2025)	"Legends" (2025)	"Dope Boy Phone" (2025)

Lil Baby singles chronology
"Touchdown" (2025)	"Legends" (2025)

Music video
- "Legends" on YouTube

"Legends" is a single by American rappers Quavo and Lil Baby, released on April 11, 2025. It was produced by Wheezy and ATL Jacob.

== Composition ==
"Legends" is a trap song. It contains a midtempo beat with an "ominous" organ and rattling snare. Lyrically, the rappers reflect on their respective journeys to success, including their pain and perseverance along the way. They also boast their material rewards, including money, clothes, cars and women, as well as their legacy in modern hip-hop. Lil Baby begins the song with his verse, recounting his determination to always succeed despite distractions. Quavo performs the next verse in his signature melodic delivery, in which he hints at troubles in his past and celebrates having achieved dreams that once seemed to be unreachable.

== Critical reception ==
Armon Sadler of Vibe wrote "Baby's verse is fine, and Huncho delivered his occasional strong performance, but there's something about the song that feels a bit empty. Nonetheless, it is nice to see bygones be bygones. If they have more music coming, this song doesn’t make anyone less excited about it. However, in a rap space that is craving people to step up, 'Legends' isn't going to get it done. It does cement them as two of Atlanta's stars, but that is something that has already long been known." Gabriel Bras Nevares of HotNewHipHop wrote "'Legends' is a fittingly woozy but slick trap cut that lets each Georgia MC take things easy or speedy with their flows, switching things up here and there for melodic accents and more straightforward verses. It's great to hear these two on wax together again, and hopefully it won't be their last team-up."

== Music video ==
The music video was released alongside the single. Directed by Hidji, it opens with the rappers in a garage filled with luxury cars, including Lamborghinis, Mercedes-Benz G-Classes and a yellow Rolls Royce Phantom. The clip follows with them racing in sports cars through the streets of Atlanta at night and partying on yachts. Quavo is also seen at the pool and shows off his chains. Throughout the video, the rappers are surrounded by many women.

== Charts ==
Chart performance for "Legends"
Chart (2025)	Peak position
US Bubbling Under Hot 100 (Billboard)	1
US Hot R&B/Hip-Hop Songs (Billboard)	23
