= My Dawg (Lil Baby song) =

2017 single by Lil Baby

Single by Lil Baby

from the album Harder Than Hard
- Released: July 13, 2017
- Genre: Trap
- Length: 3:36
- Label: Quality Control
- Songwriters: Dominique A. Jones; Christopher Rosser
- Producer: Quay Global

Lil Baby singles chronology
"My Dawg" (2017)	"The Hard Way" (2017)

Music video
- "My Dawg" on YouTube

"My Dawg" is the debut single by American rapper Lil Baby. It was released on July 13, 2017, as the lead single from his mixtape Harder Than Hard. The song peaked at number 71 on the Billboard Hot 100.

== Music video ==
The music video for the track was released on July 18, 2017, on the WorldStarHipHop YouTube channel. The video opens and closes with clips from the 1993 film Menace II Society.

As of January 2025, the video has over 150 million views.

== Remix ==
A remix of the track, featuring new guest verses from Quavo, Moneybagg Yo, and Kodak Black, was released on December 5, 2017. The remix was later included on the compilation album Control the Streets, Volume 1 by American record label Quality Control.

== Critical reception ==
Michael Saponara of Billboard ranked the track the second best in Lil Baby's discography, calling it a "triumphant anthem". Robby Seabrook III of XXL called the track "infectious". Mitch Findlay of HotNewHipHop said the track had a "catchy melody" and called it "hypnotic".

== Charts ==
Chart (2017–2018)	Peak position
US Billboard Hot 100	71
US Hot R&B/Hip-Hop Songs (Billboard)	29

== Certifications ==
Region	Certification	Certified units/sales
Canada (Music Canada)	Gold	40,000^{‡}
United States (RIAA)	Platinum	1,000,000^{‡}
^{‡} Sales+streaming figures based on certification alone.
