= Harder Than Ever =

2018 album by Lil Baby

Studio album by Lil Baby
- Released: May 18, 2018
- Genres: Hip-hop; trap
- Length: 51:16
- Labels: 4PF; Wolfpack; Quality Control; Motown; Capitol
- Producers: B-Rackz; DJ Durel; Earl the Pearll; London on da Track; Max Lord; OZ; Quay Global; Southside; Tay Keith; Turbo; Wheezy

Lil Baby chronology
Too Hard (2017)	Harder Than Ever (2018)	Drip Harder (2018)

Singles from Harder Than Ever
- 1. "Southside" Released: May 8, 2018; 2. "Yes Indeed" Released: May 15, 2018

Harder Than Ever is the debut studio album by American rapper Lil Baby. It was released on May 18, 2018, by 4 Pockets Full, Wolfpack Music Group, Quality Control Music, Motown and Capitol Records. The album features guest appearances from Starlito, Drake, Moneybagg Yo, Gunna, Young Thug, Offset, Lil Uzi Vert, and Hoodrich Pablo Juan. It also features production from Southside, Wheezy, Tay Keith, Quay Global and Turbo, among others.

== Singles ==
The album's lead single, "Southside", was released for digital download on May 8, 2018, along with the music video. The song was produced by Southside. The music video was directed by Edgar Esteves.

The album's second single, "Yes Indeed" with Drake, was released on May 15, 2018. The song was produced by Wheezy.

== Critical reception ==
Professional ratings
Review scores
Source	Rating
HipHopDX	3.7/5
HotNewHipHop	89%
Pitchfork	6.6/10

Harder Than Ever was met with generally positive reviews. At Album of the Year, the album received an average score of 70 out of 100, based on two reviews.

Evan Rytlewski at Pitchfork gave the album mixed a review giving it 6.6 out of 10. Although he ended describing Lil Baby's debut, "Technically impressive: polished, efficient, but also kind of nondescript". He also stated that "Baby’s rapping isn’t any flashier than his fashion sense. He rhymes in a tuneful, half-sung stream of thought, sort of like a more nuanced Rich Homie Quan. On a purely technical level, he’s impressive."

== Commercial performance ==
Harder Than Ever debuted at number three on the US Billboard 200 chart, earning 71,000 album-equivalent units (including 6,000 copies in pure album sales) in its first week. This became Lil Baby's first US top ten debut on the chart. In its second week, the album dropped to number seven on the chart, earning an additional 45,000 units. In its third week, the album dropped to number nine on the chart, moving 37,000 more units. In its fourth week, the album remained at number nine, earning 34,000 units, bringing its four-week total to 184,000 album-equivalent units. As of December 2018, the album has earned 717,000 album-equivalent units in the US. On February 28, 2020, the album was certified platinum by the Recording Industry Association of America (RIAA) for combined sales and album-equivalent units of over a million units in the United States.

== Track listing ==
Harder Than Ever track listing
No.	Title	Writer(s)	Producer(s)	Length
1.	"Intro"	Dominique Jones; Chris Rosser	Quay Global	1:33
2.	"Spazz"	Jones; Joshua Luellen	Southside; Bobby Raps^{[a]}	1:48
3.	"I'm Straight"	Jones; Rosser	Quay Global	3:12
4.	"Exotic" (featuring Starlito)	Jones; Jermaine Shute; Brytavious Chambers	Tay Keith	2:42
5.	"Yes Indeed" (with Drake)	Jones; Aubrey Graham; Wesley Glass; Branden Brown	Wheezy; B-Rackz^{[a]}	2:22
6.	"Leaked"	Jones; Rosser; Sheldon Ferguson	Quay Global	3:12
7.	"Bank" (featuring Moneybagg Yo)	Jones; Demario White, Jr.; Chandler Durham	Turbo; OZ^{[a]}	3:06
8.	"Cash"	Jones; Rosser	Quay Global	3:18
9.	"Southside"	Jones; Luellen	Southside; Max Lord^{[a]}	2:53
10.	"Throwing Shade" (featuring Gunna)	Jones; Sergio Kitchens; Rosser	Quay Global	3:12
11.	"First Class"	Jones; Rosser	Quay Global	3:21
12.	"Right Now" (featuring Young Thug)	Jones; Jeffery Williams; London Holmes	London on da Track	3:25
13.	"Life Goes On" (featuring Gunna and Lil Uzi Vert)	Jones; Kitchens; Symere Woods; Rosser	Quay Global	4:07
14.	"Transporter" (featuring Offset)	Jones; Kiari Cephus; Daryl McPherson	DJ Durel	3:33
15.	"Fit In"	Jones; Isaac Bynum	Earl the Pearll	3:33
16.	"Boss Bitch" (featuring Hoodrich Pablo Juan)	Jones; Sterling Pennix; Rosser	Quay Global	2:44
17.	"Never Needed No Help"	Jones; Bynum	Earl the Pearll	3:15
Total length:				51:16

Notes

- ^{^[a]} signifies an uncredited co-producer

== Personnel ==
Technical

- Quay Global – recording (tracks 1–4, 6, 8, 9, 13, 16)
- Turbo – recording (track 7)
- Tony Wilson – additional editing (all tracks)
- Mattazik Muzik – recording (tracks 10–12, 14, 15, 17)
- Michael "MikFly" Dottin – mixing (tracks 1–4, 6–17)
- Noah "40" Shebib – mixing (track 5)
- Colin Leonard – mastering (all tracks)

== Charts ==
=== Weekly charts ===
Weekly chart performance for Harder Than Ever
Chart (2018-2020)	Peak position
Canadian Albums (Billboard)	9
Dutch Albums (Album Top 100)	129
US Billboard 200	3
US Top R&B/Hip-Hop Albums (Billboard)	2

=== Year-end charts ===
Annual chart performance for Harder Than Ever
Chart (2018)	Position
US Billboard 200	39
US Top R&B/Hip-Hop Albums (Billboard)	22
Chart (2019)	Position
US Billboard 200	75
US Top R&B/Hip-Hop Albums (Billboard)	47
Chart (2020)	Position
US Billboard 200	181

=== Decade-end charts ===
Decade-end chart performance for Harder Than Ever
Chart (2010–2019)	Position
US Billboard 200	164

== Certifications ==
Sales certifiations for Harder Than Ever
Region	Certification	Certified units/sales
Canada (Music Canada)	Gold	40,000^{‡}
New Zealand (RMNZ)	Gold	7,500^{‡}
United Kingdom (BPI)	Silver	60,000^{‡}
United States (RIAA)	Platinum	1,000,000^{‡}
^{‡} Sales+streaming figures based on certification alone.
