= Phone Down (Stefflon Don and Lil Baby song) =

Single by Stefflon Don & Lil Baby
- Released: June 19, 2019
- Length: 3:36
- Label: 54 London
- Songwriter(s): Stephanie Allen; Fred Gibson; Dominique Jones
- Producer(s): Fred Again; Sam Tsang (additional)

Stefflon Don singles chronology
"Don Walk" (2019)	"Phone Down" (2019)	"Fire in the Booth, Pt. 1" (2019)

Lil Baby singles chronology
"Leave Em Alone" (2019)	"Phone Down" (2019)	"Out the Mud" (2019)

"Phone Down" is a song by British rapper Stefflon Don and American rapper Lil Baby. Following its premiere as BBC Radio 1 DJ Annie Mac's Hottest Record in the World on June 19, 2019, the song was released as a single through 54 London, peaking at number 68 on the UK chart. The song was written by the artists and Fred Again, who produced the song with Sam Tsang.

== Track listing ==
Digital download
No.	Title	Length
1.	"Phone Down"	3:36

== Charts ==
Chart (2018)	Peak position
UK Singles (OCC)	68
UK Hip Hop/R&B (OCC)	37
