= 5AM (Lil Baby song) =

2024 single by Lil Baby

Single by Lil Baby
- Released: November 14, 2024
- Length: 1:42
- Label: Quality Control; Motown
- Songwriters: Dominique Jones; Wesley Glass; Sean Momberger; David Andersen
- Producers: Wheezy; Momberger

Lil Baby singles chronology
"Options" (2024)	"5AM" (2024)	"Insecurities" (2024)

Music video
- "5AM" on YouTube

"5AM" is a song by American rapper Lil Baby, released on November 14, 2024. It was produced by Wheezy and Sean Momberger.

== Composition ==
The song features hard-hitting production. Lyrically, it focuses on Lil Baby's emotions and pressures from expectations and being a celebrity. He discusses these various pitfalls, such as struggling with vulnerability and survivor's guilt, and the police trying to connect him to certain crimes. Lil Baby ends the song with a message that his next album will soon be released.

== Critical reception ==
Sha Be Allah of The Source wrote the song "highlights the Atlanta superstar's charisma and Teflon's resiliency, ultimately the track's driving forces." Armon Sadler of Vibe gave a negative review, commenting "'5AM' is pretty boring, admittedly. It continues a harsh reality for the Atlanta star: his rap style, flows, delivery, production, and content have not elevated in years. Hearing the same guy since 2020's My Turn is a bit disheartening for those amazed by the hunger and consistency he displayed that year and the year prior."

== Music video ==
The music video was directed by Skeeboe and premiered alongside the single.

== Charts ==
Chart performance for "5AM"
Chart (2024)	Peak position
US Bubbling Under Hot 100 (Billboard)	2
US Hot R&B/Hip-Hop Songs (Billboard)	29
