= Out the Mud =

2019 song by Lil Baby and Future

Single by Lil Baby and Future
- Released: June 21, 2019
- Genre: Trap
- Length: 2:37
- Label: Quality Control; Wolfpack; Motown
- Songwriters: Dominique Jones; Nayvadius Wilburn; Christopher Rosser
- Producer: Quay Global

Lil Baby singles chronology
"Phone Down" (2019)	"Out the Mud" (2019)	"Baby" (2019)

Future singles chronology
"First Off" (2019)	"Out the Mud" (2019)	"100 Shooters" (2019)

Music video
- "Out the Mud" on YouTube

"Out the Mud" is a song by American rappers Lil Baby and Future, released on June 21, 2019 through Quality Control Music, Wolf Pack Global and Motown. Written alongside producer Quay Global, it peaked at number 70 on the Billboard Hot 100.

== Background and composition ==
The song, which was announced by Lil Baby on an Instagram story a few days before release, has a high-pitched flute loop, "sharp drums and big bass hits" in the instrumental. Lil Baby and Future reflect on their respective backgrounds before fame and rising to success.

== Music video ==
The music video was released on September 9, 2019 and filmed in the neighborhoods that the rappers grew up in Atlanta. As suggestive of the song's title, the clip begins with Lil Baby climbing up a mound of dirt with a crew and kicking around in the mud. He and Future rap in various locations in Atlanta, surrounded by people.

== Charts ==
Chart (2019)	Peak position
US Billboard Hot 100	70
US Hot R&B/Hip-Hop Songs (Billboard)	24

== Certifications ==
Region	Certification	Certified units/sales
United States (RIAA)	Platinum	1,000,000^{‡}
^{‡} Sales+streaming figures based on certification alone.
