= Leave Em Alone =

2019 song by Layton Greene and Lil Baby featuring City Girls and PnB Rock

Single by Layton Greene and Lil Baby featuring City Girls and PnB Rock

from the album Control the Streets, Volume 2
- Released: May 29, 2019
- Length: 2:51
- Label: Quality Control; Motown; Capitol
- Songwriters: Layton Greene; Dominique Jones; Caresha Brownlee; Rakim Allen; Christian Ward; Carl McCormick; Paul Cabbin; Racquelle Anteola; Ciara Harris; Curtis Jackson; Rodney Jerkins; LaShawn Daniels
- Producers: Hitmaka; Cardiak; Paul Cabbin; Rodney Jerkins

Layton Greene singles chronology
"Myself" (2018)	"Leave Em Alone" (2019)	"I Love You" (2019)

Lil Baby singles chronology
"Trap" (2019)	"Leave Em Alone" (2019)	"Phone Down" (2019)

City Girls singles chronology
"Throw Fits" (2019)	"Leave Em Alone" (2019)	"She A Winner" (2019)

PnB Rock singles chronology
"Cross Me" (2019)	"Leave Em Alone" (2019)	"Fendi" (2019)

Music video
- "Leave Em Alone" on YouTube

"Leave Em Alone" is a song by American singer Layton Greene and American rapper Lil Baby featuring fellow American rappers Yung Miami (of City Girls) and PnB Rock. It was released on May 29, 2019, as the lead single from American record label Quality Control's compilation album Control the Streets, Volume 2 (2019). The song was produced by Hitmaka and Cardiak and it samples "Can't Leave 'em Alone" by Ciara featuring 50 Cent.

== Composition ==
In the song, Layton Greene sings about not being able to leave a man. She samples the chorus of "Can't Leave 'em Alone" and sings with her own lines, showcasing her "showcasing her soft and dainty vocals in the hook", while the featured rappers each provide a "strong delivery" on each of their verses.

== Music video ==
The music video was released on July 15, 2019, and directed by Zain Alexander Shammas. In it, the artists meet at the fictional Quality Control University.

== Charts ==
=== Weekly charts ===
Chart (2019)	Peak position
US Billboard Hot 100	60
US Hot R&B/Hip-Hop Songs (Billboard)	27
US Hot R&B Songs (Billboard)	5
US Rhythmic Airplay (Billboard)	1

=== Year-end charts ===
Chart (2020)	Position
US Hot R&B/Hip-Hop Songs (Billboard)	93
US Rhythmic (Billboard)	32

== Certifications ==
Region	Certification	Certified units/sales
United Kingdom (BPI)	Silver	200,000^{‡}
United States (RIAA)	Platinum	1,000,000^{‡}
^{‡} Sales+streaming figures based on certification alone.
