= Southside (Lil Baby song) =

Single by Lil Baby

Single by Lil Baby

from the album Harder Than Ever
- Released: May 8, 2018
- Recorded: 2018
- Length: 2:53
- Label: 4PF; Wolfpack; Quality Control; Motown; Capitol
- Songwriters: Dominique Jones; Joshua Luellen
- Producers: Southside; Max Lord

Lil Baby singles chronology
"Sold Out Dates" (2018)	"Southside" (2018)	"Gossip" (2018)

Music video
- "Southside" on YouTube

"Southside" is a song by American rapper Lil Baby. It was released by 4 Pockets Full, Wolfpack Music Group, Quality Control Music, Motown and Capitol Records on May 8, 2018 as the first single from Lil Baby's debut album Harder Than Ever (2018). It was produced by Southside and Max Lord.

== Composition ==
The song features "street-oriented bars" from Lil Baby, who pays homage to his Atlanta neighborhood and raps about "everything from swag, Crips, and his Draco".

== Music video ==
The music video was released on May 8, 2018, and was directed by Edgar Esteves. Filmed in Lil Baby's neighborhood, he "gathers everyone for this video" where they are shown dancing and flashing money on a "sunny spring day".

== Charts ==
Chart (2018)	Peak position
US Billboard Hot 100	79
US Hot R&B/Hip-Hop Songs (Billboard)	39

== Certifications ==
Region	Certification	Certified units/sales
United States (RIAA)	Gold	500,000^{‡}
^{‡} Sales+streaming figures based on certification alone.
