= Untrapped: The Story of Lil Baby =

- Poster
- Directed by: Karam Gill
- Produced by: Dominique Jones; Pierre Thomas; Kevin Lee; Karam Gill; Daniel Malikyar; Andrew Primavera; Blase Biello
- Starring: Lil Baby
- Cinematography: Joshua Charow
- Edited by: Joshua Whitaker
- Music by: Craig DeLeon
- Production companies: Quality Films; MGX Creative; 4PF
- Distributed by: Amazon Studios
- Release date: June 11, 2022 (Tribeca)
- Running time: 90 minutes
- Country: United States
- Language: English

The Untrapped: The Story of Lil Baby is a 2022 documentary film centered on rapper Lil Baby, directed by Karam Gill. It premiered at the Tribeca Film Festival on June 11, 2022, and was released on Amazon Prime Video on August 26, 2022.

== Summary ==
The film follows the story of rapper Lil Baby's life and career. Born Dominique Jones, he was arrested and sent to prison as a teenager. After being released from prison in 2016 at age 21, he started a rap career, releasing his debut mixtape, Perfect Timing, in 2017, and then his album, My Turn, in 2020, which reached number 1 on the Billboard 200. The film includes archival footage of Lil Baby's childhood in Atlanta and adolescence as a drug dealer, and present-day footage with his children. It touches on social issues, such as the 2020 Black Lives Matter protests, and Lil Baby's relationship with the late Atlanta rapper Lil Marlo. It includes interviews with rappers Young Thug, Gunna, and Drake.

== Cast ==
- Lil Baby
- Young Thug
- Gunna
- Drake

== Release ==
The film premiered at the Tribeca Film Festival on June 11, 2022, where it was followed by a six-song set performed by Lil Baby. It was released on Prime Video on August 26, 2022.
