= Sold Out Dates =

Single by Gunna and Lil Baby

Single by Gunna featuring Lil Baby
- Released: April 17, 2018
- Length: 2:46
- Label: YSL
- Songwriters: Sergio Kitchens; Dominique Jones; Chandler Durham; Matthew Charles
- Producers: Turbo; Ghetto Guitar

Gunna singles chronology
"Po'ed Up" (2018)	"Sold Out Dates" (2018)	"Dead Presidents" (2018)

Lil Baby singles chronology
"No Socks" (2018)	"Sold Out Dates" (2018)	"Southside" (2018)

"Sold Out Dates" is a song by American rapper Gunna featuring fellow American rapper Lil Baby, released on April 17, 2018. After the song leaked, Gunna decided to release it due to positive fan and critical reception. The song was written alongside producers Turbo and Ghetto Guitar.

Later in the year, the flow and cadence in the song is interpolated on fellow American rapper Travis Scott's single, "Yosemite", which features Gunna and Canadian rapper Nav.

== Composition ==
The song uses a "booming 808" with guitar loops in a trap beat, and finds the rappers narrating the riches from their successes. In the chorus and first verse, Gunna sings about his luxurious ways ("Addicted to sex, I gotta get laid / My jacket Off-White, don't mean that it's beige / I clean that real nice, I don't got a maid / Ape in the night, I'm still rocking Bape"). Lil Baby recollects on hanging out with Gunna and his life: "Me and young Gunna back at it again / We just in New York, double datin' with twins / I just bought a Wraith, I retired the Benz / I fired my bitch and I hired her friend".

== Charts ==
Chart (2018)	Peak position
US Bubbling Under Hot 100 (Billboard)	4
US Bubbling Under R&B/Hip-Hop Singles (Billboard)	3

== Certifications ==
Region	Certification	Certified units/sales
Canada (Music Canada)	3× Platinum	240,000^{‡}
New Zealand (RMNZ)	Gold	15,000^{‡}
South Africa (RISA)	Gold	20,000^{‡}
United Kingdom (BPI)	Silver	200,000^{‡}
United States (RIAA)	Platinum	1,000,000^{‡}
^{‡} Sales+streaming figures based on certification alone.
