= Ekkstacy =

Canadian musician (born 2002)

- Born: Khyree Zienty; 2002 (age 23–24)
- Origin: Vancouver, British Columbia, Canada
- Genres: Indie rock; post-punk; synthwave; punk rock; punk rap; garage rock; new wave; emo
- Occupations: Singer; songwriter; rapper
- Years active: 2020–present

Khyree Zienty, professionally known as Ekkstacy (born 2002; stylized as EKKSTACY), is a Canadian singer-songwriter from Vancouver, British Columbia. He rose to fame with the release of his song "I Walk This Earth All by Myself", which went viral on TikTok.

== Early life ==
Ekkstacy was born and raised in Vancouver, British Columbia. He stated that he had a normal childhood until his parents divorced when he entered high school. He then began to struggle socially and at one point had an episode of psychosis induced by drugs in which he attempted suicide by jumping out of a window. He began playing the guitar in 6th grade and enjoyed skateboarding.

== Career ==
Ekkstacy began creating music during high school. His music primarily involved beats uploaded on YouTube, which he sang over. He released his debut EP Negative in November 2021, with the single "I Walk This Earth All by Myself". He released the album Misery in September 2022, which was more rock- and new wave-inspired than his previous release. He released another album, EKKSTACY, on January 19, 2024. It contained two features from The Kid Laroi and Trippie Redd. On May 16, 2025, he released his third studio album FOREVER. In November, he released the deluxe edition to his project, titled Forever And Always.

== Personal life ==
In his interview with THE CUFFBOYS, Ekkstacy stated that he is of Jamaican descent through his father. In his interview with Rolling Stone, he stated that he deals with insecurity and despises the Internet. in his interview with Paper, Ekkstacy stated that he was addicted to Xanax and Klonopin.

== Music style ==
His music is considered to be a mix of new wave, post-punk, indie rock, gothic rock and punk rock. He stated that his inspirations include indie artists such as the Drums and Current Joys, 80's rock bands such as the Misfits, the Cure, Christian Death and SoundCloud rappers such as XXXTentacion.

== Discography ==
=== Albums ===
- Misery (2022)
- Ekkstacy (2024)
- Forever (2025)

=== Extended plays ===
- Negative (2021)

=== Singles ===
- "Stupid Kids" (2020)
- "Uncomparable" (2020)
- "Love" (2020)
- "Starry Eyes" (2020)
- "See You Later" (2020)
- "I Walk This Earth All by Myself" (2021)
- "I Want to Be by Your Side" (featuring Herhexx) (2021)
- "F*ck Everything!" (featuring the Drums) (2021)
- "In Love" (2021)
- "It Only Gets Worse, I Promise" (2021)
- "I Gave You Everything" (2022)
- "Wish I Was Dead" (2022)
- "I Want to Die in Your Arms" (2022)
- "I Just Want to Hide My Face" (2022)
- "Problems" (featuring Trippie Redd) (2023)
- "Bella / I Can't Find Anyone" (2023)
- "Shutting Me Out / Goo Lagoon" (2023)
- "Chicago" (2024)
- "Mr. Mole" (2024)
- "Seventeen" (2024)
- "She Will Be Missed" (2024)

=== As featured artist ===
- "I Guess" - See You Next Year and MIKE DEAN
- ”Still breathing” with HEALTH on Disco No. 4
- "Neva Sober" - with Echstacy

== Tours ==
=== Supporting ===
- Suicideboys - Grey Day 2024 Tour (2024)

=== Headlining ===
- Forever Tour (2025)
