= Secure =

Secure may refer to:

- Security, being protected against danger or loss(es)
  - Physical security, security measures that are designed to deny unauthorized access to facilities, equipment, and resources
  - Information security, defending information from unauthorized access, use, disclosure, disruption, modification, perusal, inspection, recording or destruction
  - Secure communication, when two entities are communicating and do not want a third party to listen in
- Securitate (Romanian for "security"), the secret service of Communist Romania
- Security (finance), e.g. secured loans
  - Secured transaction, a loan or a credit transaction in which the lender acquires a security interest in collateral owned by the borrower
  - Secured creditor, a creditor with the benefit of a security interest over some or all of the assets of the debtor
- Secure (G5), a NatureServe conservation status similar to "Least Concern", indicating a species is not at risk of extinction
- Sécure River, Bolivia

== See also ==
- Insecurity (disambiguation)
