= Right On (song) =

2022 single by Lil Baby

Single by Lil Baby
- Released: April 8, 2022
- Genre: Crunk; trap
- Length: 3:34
- Label: Quality Control; Motown
- Songwriters: Dominique Jones; Jacob Canady
- Producer: ATL Jacob

Lil Baby singles chronology
| "Vulture Island V2" (2022) | "Right On" (2022) | "In a Minute" (2022) |

Music video
- "In a Minute" on YouTube

"Right On" is a song by American rapper Lil Baby. It was released a single through Quality Control Music and Motown on April 8, 2022, concurrently with another single, "In a Minute". The song was solely produced by ATL Jacob.

== Credits and personnel ==
- Lil Baby – vocals, songwriting
- ATL Jacob – production, songwriting
- Thomas "Tillie" Mann – mixing
- Stephen "Dot Com" Farrow – mixing assistance
- Colin Leonard – mastering
- Matthew "Mattazik Muzik" Robinson – recording
- Angie Randisi – recording

== Charts ==
=== Weekly charts ===
Weekly chart performance for "Right On"
| Chart (2022) | Peak position |
|---|---|
| Canada (Canadian Hot 100) | 28 |
| Global 200 (Billboard) | 26 |
| Iceland (Tónlistinn) | 36 |
| Ireland (IRMA) | 80 |
| New Zealand Hot Singles (RMNZ) | 10 |
| South Africa (TOSAC) | 73 |
| UK Singles (OCC) | 78 |
| US Billboard Hot 100 | 13 |
| US Hot R&B/Hip-Hop Songs (Billboard) | 5 |

=== Year-end charts ===
2022 year-end chart performance for "Right On"
| Chart (2022) | Position |
|---|---|
| US Hot R&B/Hip-Hop Songs (Billboard) | 32 |

== Certifications ==
Certifications for "Right On"
| Region | Certification | Certified units/sales |
|---|---|---|
| United States (RIAA) | Platinum | 1,000,000^{‡} |
^{‡} Sales+streaming figures based on certification alone.
