= Crazy (Lil Baby song) =

2023 single by Lil Baby

Single by Lil Baby
- Released: December 15, 2023
- Length: 3:12
- Label: Quality Control; Motown
- Songwriters: Dominique Jones; Mohkom Bhangal; Isak Gidgård; Henri Velasco
- Producers: Money Musik; Str8cash; Hoops

Lil Baby singles chronology
"Okay" (2023)	"Crazy" (2023)	"350" (2023)

Music video
- "Crazy" on YouTube

"Crazy" is a song by American rapper Lil Baby, released on December 15, 2023 alongside another single, "350". It was produced by Money Musik, Str8cash and Hoops.

== Composition ==
The song uses a piano beat, consisting of arpeggios. Using a harmonic, crooning flow, Lil Baby reflects on finding success in the rap industry and fighting obstacles, as well as self-doubt. He also shows support for incarcerated rapper Pooh Shiesty.

== Music video ==
An official music video was directed by Daps and released on January 17, 2024. Filmed in France, it finds Lil Baby showing off his wealth and spending quality time with family.

== Charts ==
Chart performance for "Crazy"
Chart (2023)	Peak position
US Billboard Hot 100	83
US Hot R&B/Hip-Hop Songs (Billboard)	20
