= In a Minute (song) =

2022 single by Lil Baby

Single by Lil Baby

from the album It's Only Me
- Released: April 8, 2022
- Recorded: 2021–2022
- Genre: Trap
- Length: 3:20
- Label: Quality Control; Motown
- Songwriters: Dominique Jones; Ellie Goulding; Jim Eliot; Kai Hasegawa; Ethan Hayes; Jacob Canady; Howard New AKA George Flynn
- Producer: Kaigoinkrazy

Lil Baby singles chronology
"Right On" (2022)	"In a Minute" (2022)	"2step" (2022)

Music video
- "In a Minute" on YouTube

"In a Minute" is a song by American rapper Lil Baby. It was released a single through Quality Control Music and Motown on April 8, 2022, concurrently with another single, "Right On". The song was produced by Kaigoinkrazy and co-produced by Haze. It samples English singer and songwriter Ellie Goulding's track, "Don't Say a Word", from her second studio album, Halcyon (2012) and Canadian rapper Drake's 2013 Jay-Z-assisted, "Pound Cake / Paris Morton Music 2" from Drake's third studio album, Nothing Was the Same.

== Credits and personnel ==
- Lil Baby – vocals, songwriting
- Ellie Goulding – songwriting
- Jim Eliot – songwriting
- Kai "Kaigoinkrazy" Hasegawa – songwriting
- Howard New AKA George Flynn – songwriting
- Ethan "Haze" Hayes – co-production, songwriting
- Thomas "Tillie" Mann – mixing
- Stephen "Dot Com" Farrow – mixing assistance
- Colin Leonard – mastering
- Matthew "Mattazik Musik" Robinson – recording
- Angie Randisi – recording

== Music video ==
The official music video released on YouTube on April 7, 2022. It surpassed 100 million views in December 2022.

== Charts ==
=== Weekly charts ===
Weekly chart performance for "In a Minute"
Chart (2022)	Peak position
Canada Hot 100 (Billboard)	38
Global 200 (Billboard)	27
Ireland (IRMA)	76
New Zealand Hot Singles (RMNZ)	16
South Africa Streaming (TOSAC)	41
UK Singles (OCC)	44
UK Hip Hop/R&B (OCC)	19
US Billboard Hot 100	14
US Hot R&B/Hip-Hop Songs (Billboard)	5
US Rhythmic Airplay (Billboard)	2

=== Year-end charts ===
2022 year-end chart performance for "In a Minute"
Chart (2022)	Position
US Billboard Hot 100	43
US Hot R&B/Hip-Hop Songs (Billboard)	14
US Rhythmic (Billboard)	25

== Certifications ==
Certifications for "In a Minute"
Region	Certification	Certified units/sales
New Zealand (RMNZ)	Gold	15,000^{‡}
United Kingdom (BPI)	Silver	200,000^{‡}
United States (RIAA)	3× Platinum	3,000,000^{‡}
^{‡} Sales+streaming figures based on certification alone.
