= Street Gossip (mixtape) =

Mixtape by Lil Baby
- Released: November 30, 2018
- Recorded: 2018
- Genre: Hip-hop
- Length: 41:29
- Labels: Quality Control; Motown; Capitol; Wolfpack
- Producers: Algino; Mattazik Muzik; Metro Boomin; Milan Beker; Quay Global; Wheezy

Lil Baby chronology
Drip Harder (2018)	Street Gossip (2018)	My Turn (2020)

Street Gossip is a commercial mixtape by American rapper Lil Baby. It was released on November 30, 2018, by Quality Control Music, Motown, Capitol Records and Wolfpack Music Group. It features guest appearances from Meek Mill, Gunna, 2 Chainz, Gucci Mane, Rylo Rodriguez, Offset, Young Thug, and NoCap.

== Background ==
Lil Baby announced the project in early November 2018, later posting the cover art and track listing.

== Cover art ==
The cover art features a black-and-white photograph of Lil Baby performing shirtless, with his name and the title displayed above them, with the words "Preacher Man" in the bottom right corner. Photo was shot by Joshua Nichols.

== Commercial performance ==
Street Gossip debuted at number two on the US Billboard 200 with 88,000 album-equivalent units, including 5,000 pure sales in its first week. In its second week, the album dropped to number nine on the chart, moving another 42,000 album-equivalent units that week. On February 8, 2020, the album was certified gold by the Recording Industry Association of America (RIAA) for combined sales and album-equivalent units of over 500,000 units in the United States. It was Lil Baby's highest-charting project until his album My Turn debuted at number one in 2020.

== Track listing ==
Credits adapted from Tidal.

No.	Title	Writer(s)	Producer(s)	Length
1.	"Global"	Dominique Jones; Chris Rosser	Quay Global	2:49
2.	"Pure Cocaine"	Jones; Rosser; Matthew Robinson	Quay Global; Mattazik Muzik	2:34
3.	"Crush a Lot"	Jones; Rosser	Quay Global	2:39
4.	"Time" (featuring Meek Mill)	Jones; Robert Williams; Rosser	Quay Global	3:02
5.	"Ready" (featuring Gunna)	Jones; Sergio Kitchens; Leland Wayne; Milan Beker	Metro Boomin; Beker	3:33
6.	"Word on the Street"	Jones; Rosser; Justin Lee; Marquis Cobb	Quay Global	2:52
7.	"This Week"	Jones; Rosser	Quay Global	3:16
8.	"Anyway" (featuring 2 Chainz and Gucci Mane)	Jones; Tauheed Epps; Radric Davis; Rosser	Quay Global	3:46
9.	"No Friends" (featuring Rylo Rodriguez)	Jones; Ryan Adams; Rosser	Quay Global	3:12
10.	"Realist in It" (featuring Gucci Mane and Offset)	Jones; Davis; Kiari Cephus; Rosser	Quay Global	3:42
11.	"Section 8" (featuring Young Thug)	Jones; Jeffery Williams; Wesley Glass	Wheezy	3:26
12.	"Chastised"	Jones; Gene Hixon	Al Geno	2:03
13.	"Dreams 2 Reality" (featuring NoCap)	Jones; Kobe Crawford; Gene Hixon	Al Geno	4:35
Total length:				41:29

== Personnel ==
Credits adapted from Tidal.

Technical

- Thomas "Tillie" Mann – mixing (1–4, 6–13)
- Princeton "Perfect Harmony" Terry – mixing assistant (tracks 1–4, 6–13)
- Ethan Stevens – mixing (track 5)
- Colin Leonard – mastering (all tracks)

== Charts ==
=== Weekly charts ===
Chart (2018)	Peak position
Belgian Albums (Ultratop Flanders)	85
Canadian Albums (Billboard)	7
Dutch Albums (Album Top 100)	31
French Albums (SNEP)	173
Irish Albums (IRMA)	89
Norwegian Albums (VG-lista)	35
Swedish Albums (Sverigetopplistan)	55
UK Albums (Official Charts)	50
US Billboard 200	2
US Top R&B/Hip-Hop Albums (Billboard)	2

=== Year-end charts ===
Chart (2019)	Position
US Billboard 200	45
US Top R&B/Hip-Hop Albums (Billboard)	29

== Certifications ==
Region	Certification	Certified units/sales
Denmark (IFPI Danmark)	Gold	10,000^{‡}
United Kingdom (BPI)	Silver	60,000^{‡}
United States (RIAA)	Gold	500,000^{‡}
^{‡} Sales+streaming figures based on certification alone.
