= Quay Global =

American hip hop and trap producer

- Born: Christopher Rosser
- Genres: Hip hop; trap
- Occupation: Record producer
- Years active: 2017–present
- Label: Quality Control Music

Christopher Rosser, better known by his stage name Quay Global, is an American record producer. He is best known for his works with rapper Lil Baby. His works can be identified by the producer tag "Cook that shit up, Quay!".

== Early life ==
Rosser started producing beats when he was nine years old. He went to Columbia High School.

== Career ==
Rosser made a name for himself by producing the track "My Dawg" by Lil Baby, which charted on the Billboard Hot 100 and was certified Platinum by the RIAA. After "My Dawg" saw success, N'Quay was signed by Atlanta-based record label Quality Control Music in October 2017. Other hit songs that Rosser has produced by Lil Baby are "Life Goes On", "Pure Cocaine", and "Woah", all of which charted on the Hot 100, the latter of which peaked at number 15.

== Production discography ==
=== Charted singles ===
Title	Year	Peak chart positions						Certifications	Album
Title	Year	US	US R&B/HH	CAN	IRE	NZ Hot	UK	Certifications	Album
"My Dawg" (Lil Baby)	2017	71	29	—	—	—	—	RIAA: Platinum; MC: Gold	Harder Than Hard
"Out the Mud" (Lil Baby and Future)	2019	70	24	—	—	—	—	RIAA: Gold	Non-album single
"Bacc At It Again" (Yella Beezy featuring Quavo and Gucci Mane)	2019	78	30	—	—	—	—	RIAA: Gold	Baccend Beezy
"Woah" (Lil Baby)	2019	15	7	28	93	18	66	RIAA: 2× Platinum	My Turn
"All In" (Lil Baby)	2020	45	20	84	—	22	—		My Turn
"Roses (Future Remix)" (Saint Jhn featuring Future)	2020	—	—	—	—	15	—		While the World Was Burning
"Narrow Road" (NLE Choppa featuring Lil Baby)	2020	— (Note: "Narrow Road" did not chart on the Billboard Hot 100, but did peak at number four on the Bubbling Under Hot 100 chart.)	46	—	—	19	—		Top Shotta
"Peep Hole" (DaBaby)	2020	— (Note: "Peep Hole" did not chart on the Billboard Hot 100, but did peak at number four on the Bubbling Under Hot 100 chart.)	46	—	—	17	—		Blame It on Baby (Deluxe)

=== Other charted songs ===
Title	Year	Peak chart positions						Certifications	Album
Title	Year	US	US R&B/HH	CAN	IRE	NZ Hot	UK	Certifications	Album
"Life Goes On" (Lil Baby featuring Gunna and Lil Uzi Vert)	2018	74	36	—	—	—	—	RIAA: Platinum; MC: Platinum	Harder Than Ever
"Deep End" (Lil Baby)	2018	97	45	—	—	—	—		Drip Harder
"I Am" (Lil Baby and Gunna)	2018	98	46	—	—	—	—	RIAA: Gold	Drip Harder
"Global" (Lil Baby)	2018	91	—	—	—	—	—	RIAA: Gold	Street Gossip
"Pure Cocaine" (Lil Baby)	2018	46	20	56	—	—	—	RIAA: 2× Platinum; MC: Platinum	Street Gossip
"Crush a Lot" (Lil Baby)	2018	82	46	—	—	—	—	RIAA: Gold	Street Gossip
"Time" (Lil Baby featuring Meek Mill)	2018	62	31	—	—	—	—	RIAA: Gold	Street Gossip
"Word On The Street" (Lil Baby)	2018	98	—	—	—	—	—		Street Gossip
"Heatin Up" (Lil Baby and Gunna)	2020	18	10	36	88	8	66	RIAA: Gold	My Turn
"Can't Explain" (Lil Baby)	2020	99	46	—	—	—	—		My Turn
"Low Down" (Lil Baby)	2020	50	15	58	—	—	—		My Turn
