= 350 (song) =

2023 single by Lil Baby

Single by Lil Baby
- Released: December 15, 2023
- Genre: Trap
- Length: 3:13
- Label: Quality Control; Motown
- Songwriters: Dominique Jones; Darryon Bunton; Jacari Cameron; Montae Jordan
- Producers: DB!; CamYouAFool; Monnymadeit

Lil Baby singles chronology
"Crazy" (2023)	"350" (2023)

"350" is a song by American rapper Lil Baby, released on December 15, 2023 alongside another single, "Crazy". It was produced by DB!, CamYouAFool and Monnymadeit.

== Background and composition ==
The song uses a trap beat that is somewhat louder than the vocals and 808-heavy production, over which Lil Baby reflects on his experiences of betrayal and appears to takes shots at his past collaborator and fellow rapper Gunna. The title of the song refers to the price that Lil Baby spent on a special edition Richard Mille watch ("Bubba Watson on my wrist, three-fifty").

== Charts ==
Chart performance for "350"
Chart (2023)	Peak position
US Bubbling Under Hot 100 (Billboard)	3
US Hot R&B/Hip-Hop Songs (Billboard)	31
