= Yes Indeed (Lil Baby and Drake song) =

2018 single by Lil Baby and Drake

Single by Lil Baby and Drake

from the album Harder Than Ever
- Released: May 17, 2018
- Recorded: 2018
- Genre: Hip hop; trap
- Length: 2:22
- Label: 4PF; Wolfpack; Quality Control; Motown; Capitol
- Songwriters: Dominique Jones; Aubrey Graham; Wesley Glass; Branden Brown
- Producers: Wheezy; B-Rackz

Lil Baby singles chronology
"Bankrupt (Remix)" (2018)	"Yes Indeed" (2018)	"First Class" (2018)

Drake singles chronology
"Nice for What" (2018)	"Yes Indeed" (2018)	"I'm Upset" (2018)

"Yes Indeed" is a song by American rapper Lil Baby and Canadian rapper Drake. It was released by 4 Pockets Full, Wolfpack Music Group, Quality Control Music, Motown and Capitol Records on May 17, 2018 as the second single from Lil Baby's debut studio album Harder Than Ever, which was released a day later. The song was produced by Wheezy and B-Rackz. It reached number one on Billboard's Streaming Songs chart, while peaking at number six on the US Billboard Hot 100, becoming Lil Baby's first top 10 hit.

== Background ==
On May 6, 2018, Drake was spotted with Lil Baby at OVO affiliate Preme's album release party in an Atlanta nightclub, where a snippet of the track surfaced on Quality Control CEO Pierre "Pee" Thomas's Instagram story. The next day, Lil Baby took to Twitter and tweeted: "Imagine Me And Drake Dropping A Song". On May 12, the song was premiered on OVO Sound Radio, originally surfacing under the title "Pikachu (No Keys)". The song was officially released to streaming services on May 15, 2018, under its revised title, "Yes Indeed".

== Charts ==
=== Weekly charts ===
Chart (2018)	Peak position
Australia (ARIA)	68
Canada Hot 100 (Billboard)	7
Ireland (IRMA)	65
Portugal (AFP)	69
Sweden (Sverigetopplistan)	91
Switzerland (Schweizer Hitparade)	94
UK Singles (OCC)	46
US Billboard Hot 100	6
US Hot R&B/Hip-Hop Songs (Billboard)	5
US Rhythmic Airplay (Billboard)	12

=== Year-end charts ===
Chart (2018)	Position
Canada (Canadian Hot 100)	74
US Billboard Hot 100	25
US Hot R&B/Hip-Hop Songs (Billboard)	13
US Rhythmic (Billboard)	43
Chart (2019)	Position
US Rolling Stone Top 100	70

== Certifications ==
Certifications for "Yes Indeed"
Region	Certification	Certified units/sales
Brazil (Pro-Música Brasil)	Platinum	40,000^{‡}
Canada (Music Canada)	3× Platinum	240,000^{‡}
Denmark (IFPI Danmark)	Gold	45,000^{‡}
Italy (FIMI)	Gold	50,000^{‡}
Portugal (AFP)	Gold	5,000^{‡}
United Kingdom (BPI)	Platinum	600,000^{‡}
United States (RIAA)	7× Platinum	7,000,000^{‡}
^{‡} Sales+streaming figures based on certification alone.
