= Layton Greene =

American R&B singer (born 1998)

- Born: December 4, 1998 (age 27); East St. Louis, Illinois, U.S.
- Genres: R&B
- Occupations: Singer; songwriter
- Years active: 2017–present
- Labels: Quality Control; Motown; Universal

Layton Greene (born December 4, 1998) is an American R&B singer from East St. Louis, Illinois. She is best known for her 2019 single "Leave Em Alone" (with Lil Baby featuring City Girls and PnB Rock), which peaked at number 60 on the Billboard Hot 100 and received platinum certification by the Recording Industry Association of America (RIAA). Previously in January of that year, she signed with Georgia-based record label Quality Control Music as its first female R&B artist. Her debut extended play (EP), Tell Ya Story, was released on September 9, 2019.

== Biography ==
Greene was born in East St. Louis, Illinois. She was raised by her mother and her step father, who eventually separated when she was 14. Greene began singing at seven years old, reciting Keyshia Cole's "Love" to her mother.

Greene studied at Jan Smith Studios in Atlanta, Georgia, learning under vocal coach Jan Smith.

Greene is in a relationship with producer G Styles on the Track, who worked with her on 2019 single "Open Wounds".

Greene names Keyshia Cole, Aaliyah, and Chris Brown as her musical influences.

== Discography ==
=== Compilation albums ===
Title	Album details	Peak chart positions			
Title	Album details	US	US R&B/HH	US Rap	CAN
Control the Streets, Volume 2 (with Quality Control)	Released: August 16, 2019; Label: Quality Control, Motown; Format: Digital download, streaming	3	3	2	5

=== Extended plays ===
List of mixtapes, with selected details
Title	Details
Tell Ya Story	Released: September 9, 2019; Label: Quality Control, Motown; Format: Digital download, streaming

=== Singles ===
List of singles as lead artist, with selected chart positions and certifications, showing year released and album name
Title	Year	Peak chart positions			Certifications	Album
Title	Year	US	US R&B /HH	US R&B	Certifications	Album
"Roll in Peace"	2017	—	—	12		Non-album singles
"Myself"	2018	—	—	—		Non-album singles
"Leave Em Alone" (with Lil Baby featuring City Girls and PnB Rock)	2019	60	27	5	RIAA: Platinum	Control the Streets, Volume 2
"I Love You"	2019	—	—	—		Tell Ya Story
"Blame on Me"	2019	—	—	—		Tell Ya Story
"Chosen One"	2020	—	—	—		Non-album single
"Spin Again"	2023	—	—	—		TBA
"Something"	2023	—	—	—		TBA
"Cinderella Story"	2023	—	—	—		TBA
"—" denotes a recording that did not chart or was not released in that territory.
