= Baby (Quality Control, Lil Baby and DaBaby song) =

Song by Quality Control, Lil Baby and DaBaby

Single by Quality Control, Lil Baby and DaBaby

from the album Control the Streets, Volume 2
- Released: July 17, 2019
- Recorded: 2019
- Genre: Trap
- Length: 2:22
- Label: Quality Control; Motown; Universal
- Songwriters: Dominique Jones; Jonathan Kirk; Wesley Glass
- Producer: Wheezy

Quality Control Music singles chronology
"Fuck Dat Nigga" (2018)	"Baby" (2019)	"Intro" (2019)

Lil Baby singles chronology
"Out the Mud" (2019)	"Baby" (2019)	"Mac 10" (2019)

DaBaby singles chronology
"Duck Sauce" (2019)	"Baby" (2019)	"Gucci Bag Latina" (2019)

Music video
- "Baby" on YouTube

"Baby" is a song released by American record label Quality Control, performed by American rappers Lil Baby and DaBaby. The song was released through Quality Control Music, Motown, and Universal Music Group (UMG). It was produced by Wheezy and released on July 17, 2019, as a single off of QC's second studio album, Control the Streets, Volume 2 (2019). The song received acclaim from critics, with particular praise for DaBaby's verse. The song's official video features Lil Baby and DaBaby portraying characters from the movie Scarface.

== Lyrics ==
In the song, Lil Baby references fellow Atlanta rapper, Bankroll Fresh, who was murdered in 2016. He claims that though he has become a millionaire he still spends time in the "projects". He raps his rags-to-riches come-up from a third-person perspective with an "infectious hook". The word "baby" is said a total of 37 times throughout the 2 and a half-minute track.

== Critical reception ==
"Baby" received acclaim from music critics. HipHopDX called the collaboration "a match made in heaven", and in their album review, commended Wheezy's production as "magical stepping stones for Lil Baby to lay his verse as he boasts about still hanging out in the projects and DaBaby smashes on the beat equally, while both maintain their own unique way of rhyming". Robert Blair of HotNewHipHop ranked DaBaby's verse on the song as his fifth best of 2019, noting how Lil Baby "handles the more melodic facets of the track" while DaBaby "comes through with a gripping verse that makes audacious claims of 'Baby gettin' jiggy, on stage with the Glizzy/Baby CEO, he shake the game like he Diddy'". SPIN magazine's Israel Daramola described the track as "a quaint record that delivers on its promise of showcasing all the two Babys have to offer us", while Christoper R. Weingarten, in review of the song's parent album, recommended it as a go-to-track, from "two of the most important rappers of 2019" and labelled it as "something that may portend rap's near future".

== Music video ==
The music video was released on August 13, 2019, three days before the release of the album. It shows Lil Baby & DaBaby in scenes from the movie Scarface. As February 2021 the video has over 100 million views.

== Commercial performance ==
The song debuted at number 42 on the Billboard Hot 100, and eventually rose to number 21 off of the release of the album and the music video.

== Live performances ==
Lil Baby and DaBaby performed the song at the 2019 BET Hip-Hop Awards, where DaBaby also won the award for Best New Artist.

== Charts ==
=== Weekly charts ===
Chart (2019)	Peak position
Canada Hot 100 (Billboard)	54
US Billboard Hot 100	21
US Hot R&B/Hip-Hop Songs (Billboard)	11
US Rhythmic Airplay (Billboard)	29
US Rolling Stone Top 100	13

=== Year-end charts ===
Chart (2019)	Position
US Billboard Hot 100	84
US Hot R&B/Hip-Hop Songs (Billboard)	38
US Rolling Stone Top 100	68
Chart (2020)	Position
US Hot R&B/Hip-Hop Songs (Billboard)	67

== Certifications ==
Region	Certification	Certified units/sales
Brazil (Pro-Música Brasil)	Gold	20,000^{‡}
New Zealand (RMNZ)	Gold	15,000^{‡}
United Kingdom (BPI)	Silver	200,000^{‡}
^{‡} Sales+streaming figures based on certification alone.
