= Duke Deuce =

American rapper (born 1992)

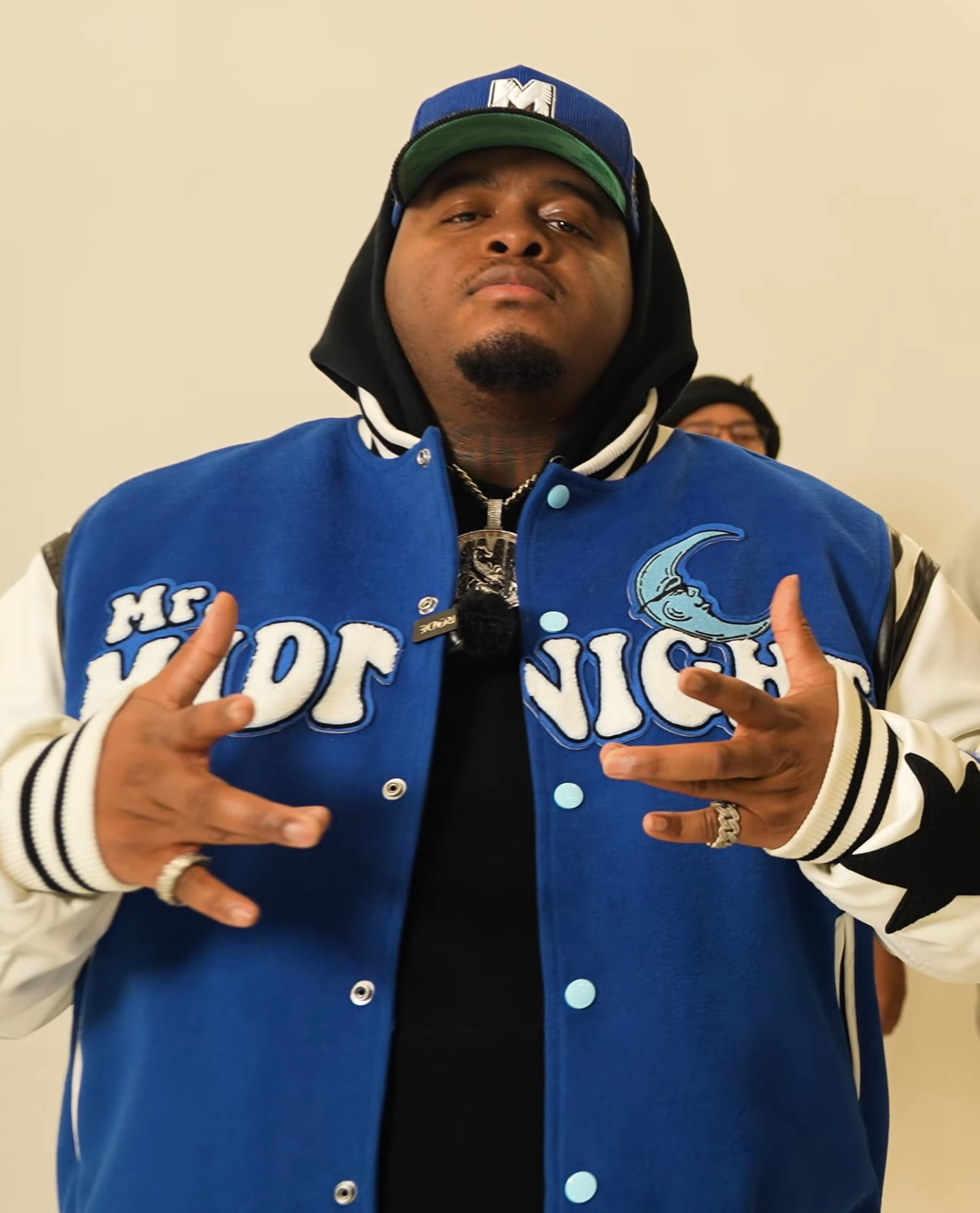
- Duke Deuce in 2024

Background information
- Born: Patavious Lashun Isom; May 1, 1992 (age 34); Memphis, Tennessee
- Genres: Hip hop; Memphis rap; rap rock
- Occupations: Rapper; songwriter
- Years active: 2016-present
- Labels: Quality Control; Motown

Patavious Lashun Isom (born May 1, 1992), better known by his stage name Duke Deuce, is an American rapper from Memphis, Tennessee. Formerly signed to Quality Control Music, Isom is best known for his song "Crunk Ain't Dead", which received a remix with fellow Memphis rappers Juicy J (who also produced the song) and Project Pat, as well as Atlanta rapper and record producer Lil Jon. He released his debut studio album, Duke Nukem, on February 26, 2021, which debuted at number three on the Billboard Heatseekers Albums chart.

== Career ==
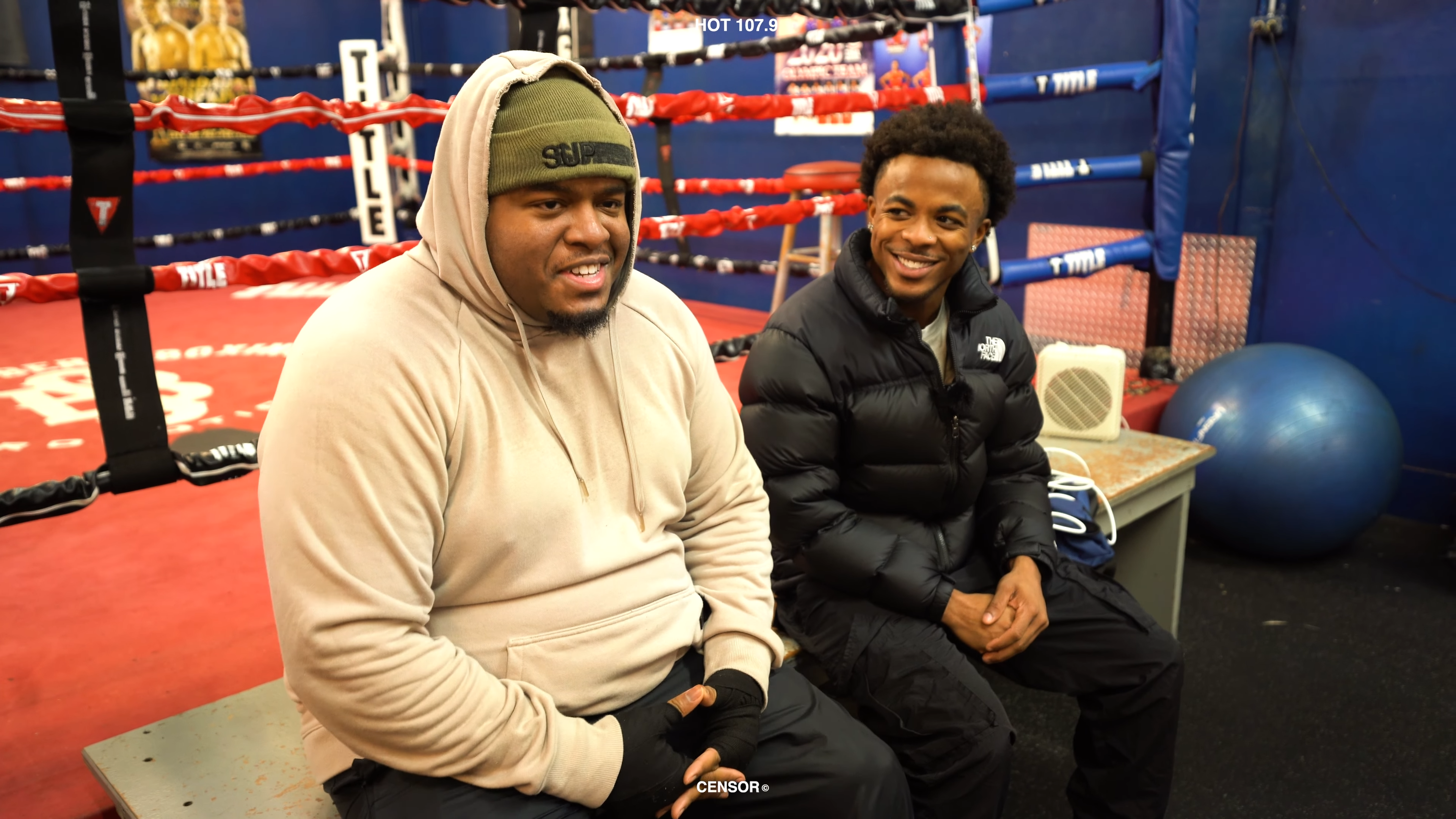
Duke Deuce in an interview with WHTA in 2024

Isom rose to fame with his single "Yeh", but gained more recognition with his track "Crunk Ain't Dead", which received a remix featuring Lil Jon, Juicy J and Project Pat. The track later served as the lead single from his third mixtape Memphis Massacre 2, which was released on February 19, 2020.

Isom's debut studio album, Duke Nukem, was released on February 26, 2021, and debuted at number three on the Billboard Heatseekers Albums chart.

His sophomore album Crunkstar was released on June 17, 2022. Memphis Massacre 3 was released on October 28, 2022.

During an interview in September 2023, Isom revealed that he is no longer signed to Quality Control.

== Discography ==
=== Studio albums ===
Title	Album details	Peak chart positions
Title	Album details	US Heat.
Duke Nukem	Released: February 26, 2021; Label: Quality Control, Motown; Format: Digital download, streaming	3
Crunkstar	Released: June 17, 2022; Label: Quality Control, Motown; Format: Digital download, streaming	
Memphis Massacre III	Released: October 28, 2022; Label: Quality Control, Motown; Format: Digital download, streaming	—

=== Compilation albums ===
Title	Album details	Peak chart positions		
Title	Album details	US	US R&B/HH	CAN
Control the Streets, Volume 2 (with Quality Control Music)	Released: August 16, 2019; Label: Quality Control, Motown, Capitol; Format: Digital download, streaming	3	3	5

=== Mixtapes ===
Title	Mixtape details
Deuce Live Music	Released: August 15, 2016; Label: UnderGround Railroad; Format: Digital download, streaming
Memphis Massacre	Released: September 7, 2018; Label: Quality Control; Format: Digital download, streaming
Memphis Massacre 2	Released: February 19, 2020; Label: Quality Control; Format: Digital download, streaming

=== Singles ===
==== As lead artist ====
Title	Year	Album
"Yeh" (with Quality Control)	2019	Control the Streets, Volume 2
"Crunk Ain't Dead" (solo or remix with Lil Jon and Juicy J featuring Project Pat)	2019	Memphis Massacre 2
"Kirk" (featuring Mulatto)	2020	Duke Nukem
"Soldiers Steppin"	2021	Duke Nukem
"Spin" (featuring Foogiano)	2021	Duke Nukem
"Step Back" (with Juicy J)	2022	Non-album single

==== As featured artist ====
Title	Year	Peak chart positions		Album
Title	Year	US Bub.	NZ Hot	Album
"Lay wit Ya" (Isaiah Rashad featuring Duke Deuce)	2021	21	21	The House is Burning
