= Insecurities (song) =

2024 single by Lil Baby

Single by Lil Baby
- Released: November 15, 2024
- Length: 2:07
- Label: Quality Control; Motown
- Songwriters: Dominique Jones; Wesley Glass; Kevin Gomringer; Tim Gomringer; Simon Gaudes; Yannis Kissinger; Jacob Sclaver; Maximilian McFarlin
- Producers: Wheezy; Cubeatz; Klimperboy; KB; Juko; Macshooter

Lil Baby singles chronology
"5AM" (2024)	"Insecurities" (2024)	"Touchdown" (2024)

Music video
- "Insecurities" on YouTube

"Insecurities" is a song by American rapper Lil Baby, released on November 15, 2024. It was produced by Wheezy, Cubeatz, Klimperboy, KB, Juko and Macshooter.

== Composition ==
The production contains a guitar loop and piano keys, over which Lil Baby performs in a slow flow. Lyrically, the song finds him detailing his love for a woman and reliability as her partner, including providing her with luxury goods and seeing past her flaws, while also boasting about his lifestyle.

== Critical reception ==
Sha Be Allah of The Source wrote of the song, "Baby's onslaught reaches new levels when he raps: "I know it gets tight paying bills, I'll take care of that / I know you been wanting to tour the world, we can go anywhere.'" Comparing it with Lil Baby's previous single "5AM", Armon Sadler of Vibe commented "'Insecurities' is a bit more interesting because he opens up more. At this stage, vulnerability and helping people understand where he is mentally at this stage of his career will be what helps people to connect more and, frankly, care at all. He is shooting 50% right now, which depending on the sport or discipline can be good in some areas and awful in others."

== Music video ==
The music video was directed by Hidji and premiered alongside the single.

== Charts ==
Chart performance for "Insecurities"
Chart (2024)	Peak position
US Billboard Hot 100	56
US Hot R&B/Hip-Hop Songs (Billboard)	10
