= Life Goes On (Lil Baby song) =

2018 song by Lil Baby featuring Gunna and Lil Uzi Vert

Song by Lil Baby featuring Gunna and Lil Uzi Vert

from the album Harder Than Ever
- Released: May 18, 2018
- Recorded: 2017–2018
- Genre: Trap
- Length: 4:07
- Label: 4PF; Wolfpack; Quality Control; Motown; Capitol
- Songwriters: Dominique Jones; Sergio Kitchens; Symere Woods; Chris Rosser
- Producer: Quay Global

"Life Goes On" is a song by American rapper Lil Baby featuring fellow American rappers Gunna and Lil Uzi Vert from the former's debut studio album Harder Than Ever (2018). The song was written by the artists alongside producer Quay Global.

== Composition ==
The song sees the rappers delivering boastful lyrics about their lifestyles. Lil Baby uses his signature melodic flow as he sing-raps about his popularity and having many prostitutes. The next verse is performed by Gunna, while Lil Uzi Vert performs an eight-line verse about having prostitutes in different cities and their Patek Philippe SA.

== Critical reception ==
The song received generally favorable reviews from critics. Israel Daramola of Spin wrote the song was especially one of the "solid records" from Harder Than Ever. Kenan Draughorne of HipHopDX cited the song as an example in which "subtle melodies in his delivery elevate his blistering flow to another level", adding that "Lil Uzi Vert and Gunna contribute impressive verses as well".

== Charts ==
Chart (2018)	Peak position
US Billboard Hot 100	74
US Hot R&B/Hip-Hop Songs (Billboard)	36

== Certifications ==
Region	Certification	Certified units/sales
Canada (Music Canada)	Platinum	80,000^{‡}
New Zealand (RMNZ)	Platinum	30,000^{‡}
United Kingdom (BPI)	Silver	200,000^{‡}
United States (RIAA)	2× Platinum	2,000,000^{‡}
^{‡} Sales+streaming figures based on certification alone.
