= Close Friends (song) =

2019 single by Lil Baby

Single by Lil Baby

from the album Drip Harder
- Released: February 2, 2019
- Recorded: 2018
- Length: 3:25
- Label: YSL; Quality Control; Motown; Capitol
- Songwriters: Dominique Jones; Chandler Durham
- Producer: Turbo

Lil Baby singles chronology
"Geek'd" (2018)	"Close Friends" (2019)	"Trap" (2019)

Music video
- "Close Friends" on YouTube

"Close Friends" is a song by American rapper Lil Baby. It was released on February 2, 2019, as the second single from Drip Harder, his collaborative mixtape with Gunna. The track was produced by Turbo. The love story-esque video, shot in Paris, France, was released on February 13, 2019, a day before Valentine's Day, and features Lil Baby and his real-life girlfriend. The song reached number one on the Billboard Rhythmic Songs airplay chart.

== Music video ==
Lil Baby and his girlfriend, Jayda Cheaves, having dinner in Paris, France

The music video was released a day before Valentine's Day 2019. Directed by Daps, it was filmed in Paris, France, during Lil Baby's first-ever trip to Paris. Lil Baby felt Paris represents love and romance, and therefore chose to shoot it there. The video features him and his real-life girlfriend Jayda Cheaves, having a romantic outdoor dinner with the Eiffel Tower in view. The visual recounts their relationship and concludes with the two having a fall out. As of September 2021, the video has over 200 million views on YouTube.

== Critical reception ==
Revolt's Chase Ichiki called the track a standout from Drip Harder.

== Charts ==
=== Weekly charts ===
Chart (2018–2019)	Peak position
Canada Hot 100 (Billboard)	74
UK Singles (Official Charts)	67
US Billboard Hot 100	28
US Hot R&B/Hip-Hop Songs (Billboard)	16
US Rhythmic Airplay (Billboard)	1

=== Year-end charts ===
Chart (2019)	Position
US Billboard Hot 100	74
US Hot R&B/Hip-Hop Songs (Billboard)	35
US Rhythmic (Billboard)	26

== Certifications ==
Region	Certification	Certified units/sales
Canada (Music Canada)	Gold	40,000^{‡}
United Kingdom (BPI)	Platinum	600,000^{‡}
United States (RIAA)	5× Platinum	5,000,000^{‡}
^{‡} Sales+streaming figures based on certification alone.
