= Freestyle (Lil Baby song) =

2017 single by Lil Baby

Single by Lil Baby

from the album Too Hard
- Released: November 5, 2017
- Genre: Trap
- Length: 2:42
- Label: 4PF; Wolfpack; Quality Control
- Songwriter: Dominique Jones
- Producer: Joseph DaVinci

Lil Baby singles chronology
"Fasho" (2017)	"Freestyle" (2017)	"Vision Clear" (2017)

Music video
- "Freestyle" on YouTube

"Freestyle" is a song by American rapper Lil Baby. It was released on November 5, 2017 with an accompanying music video, to promote his mixtape Too Hard (2017). The song became one of his most popular hits and helped him rise to prominence. The song is a sleeper hit which began charting outside of the United States in 2022 and has consistently charted high on Apple Music charts.

== Composition ==
In the song, Lil Baby raps about his usage of lean and percocets, over production by Joseph DaVinci. He gives numerous name-drops, including that of basketball player Philip Champion, and also interpolates "Hail Mary" by Tupac Shakur.

== Critical reception ==
Billboard ranked the song at number five on their list of Lil Baby's best songs.

== Charts ==
=== Weekly charts ===
2018 chart performance for "Freestyle"
Chart (2018)	Peak position
US Bubbling Under Hot 100 (Billboard)	9
US Bubbling Under R&B/Hip-Hop Songs (Billboard)	1

2022 chart performance for "Freestyle"
Chart (2022–2023)	Peak position
Canada Hot 100 (Billboard)	69
Global 200 (Billboard)	169
US Billboard Hot 100	59
US Hot R&B/Hip-Hop Songs (Billboard)	17

=== Year-end charts ===
2022 year-end chart performance for "Freestyle"
Chart (2022)	Position
US Hot R&B/Hip-Hop Songs (Billboard)	97

== Certifications ==
Region	Certification	Certified units/sales
Canada (Music Canada)	Gold	40,000^{‡}
France (SNEP)	Gold	100,000^{‡}
United Kingdom (BPI)	Platinum	600,000^{‡}
United States (RIAA)	3× Platinum	3,000,000^{‡}
^{‡} Sales+streaming figures based on certification alone.
