= Drip Harder =

Mixtape by Lil Baby and Gunna
- Released: October 5, 2018
- Recorded: 2018
- Genre: Hip-hop; trap
- Length: 38:47
- Label: YSL; Quality Control; Motown; Capitol
- Producer: Turbo (also exec.); B Rackz; Frank Dukes; Jet; June James; Loso; Mattazik Muzik; Quay Global; Sidepce; Tay Keith; Taz Taylor; Wheezy

Lil Baby chronology
Harder Than Ever (2018)	Drip Harder (2018)	Street Gossip (2018)

Gunna chronology
Drip Season 3 (2018)	Drip Harder (2018)	Drip or Drown 2 (2019)

Singles from Drip Harder
- 1. "Drip Too Hard" Released: September 12, 2018; 2. "Close Friends" Released: February 2, 2019

Drip Harder is a collaborative mixtape by American rappers Lil Baby and Gunna. It was released on October 5, 2018, by YSL Records, Quality Control Music, Motown and Capitol Records. The mixtape features guest appearances from Lil Durk, Nav, Young Thug, and Drake. It includes production from Turbo, Wheezy, and Tay Keith, among others. The name Drip Harder is taken from Gunna's Drip Season series of mixtapes and from Lil Baby's Harder series of mixtapes.

== Promotion ==
The lead single, "Drip Too Hard", was released as a single on September 12, 2018, for streaming and digital download. It peaked at number four on the US Billboard Hot 100 becoming the highest-charting song for Gunna and second highest-charting song for Lil Baby. The second single, "Close Friends" by Lil Baby, released as a single on February 2, 2019, peaked at number 28 on the Hot 100, becoming one of Lil Baby's best performing singles.

== Critical reception ==
Professional ratings
Aggregate scores
Source	Rating
Metacritic	76/100
Review scores
Source	Rating
Exclaim!	7/10
Consequence of Sound	B
Highsnobiety	3.0/5.0
HotNewHipHop	82%
Pitchfork	7.6/10
Rolling Stone	3.5/5 stars

Drip Harder received positive reviews from critics. At Metacritic, which assigns a normalized rating out of 100 to reviews from mainstream publications, the album received an average score of 76, based on 4 reviews, indicating "generally favorable reviews". Alphonse Pierre of Pitchfork praised the mixtape for the artists' chemistry, writing that "Lil Baby and Gunna’s chemistry is a refreshing splash in an Atlanta hip-hop scene that has felt stagnant. It’s the duo establishing themselves, knowing they have some limitations, but capitalizing on what they do well. And even if they break up over some pettiness like Rich Gang, Drip Harder will be remembered as a moment that let hip-hop know it had two new superstars." However, criticism was directed towards the production by main producer Turbo, whose "monotonous drums patterns grow tiresome. A few of his beats blend into one another, and he’s just not versatile enough to carry a project on his back." Online hip-hop publication HotNewHipHop commented: "As a groupable entity, Lil Baby & Gunna have done enough to earn themselves a hierarchical position in the pecking order. But more importantly, Drip Harder, a presumed team-building exercise, has ironically given rise to an even greater sense of autonomy within the group, for Lil Baby in particular."

Clayton Tomlinson of Exclaim! concluded the mixtape is "a good effort from these two but could've been tighter. It's best when Lil Baby raps about his emotions, where the two once were and when Gunna brags about how far they've come since. But it's clear, they've still got farther to go." For Consequence of Sound, Tommy Monroe complimented the stylistic production and the chemistry between the artists: "On Drip Harder, Lil Baby and Gunna make it hard to determine who shines brightest because both deliver their best most of the time. They aren’t just a duo, but a wave, a style, and a vibe." However, Monroe added "the contrasting relationship between the beat and the YSL artist’s flow makes the song sound longer than it is and consequently drag."

In light of the mixtape's release, Pitchfork and Stereogum dubbed Lil Baby and Gunna "the best rap duo in years". Comparing the duo to Young Thug and Rich Homie Quan, Tom Breihan of Stereogum wrote: "Once again, we’ve got a pairing of two young Atlanta rappers, both of whom are on a serious career upswing. Baby and Gunna are both melodic rappers, and they’re both studio rats, guys who will crank out one song after another in quick succession. They’ve got chemistry, and you can hear the exhilaration in both of their voices when they rap together. They’ve got a producer who understands them. They’ve got energy working for them, like all the planets are just now aligning in their favor."

== Commercial performance ==
Drip Harder debuted at number four on the US Billboard 200 chart, earning 130,000 album-equivalent units (including 9,000 copies in pure album sales) in its first week. This is Lil Baby's second US top-ten debut and the first for Gunna. The album also accumulated a total of 164.63 million on-demand audio streams for the album's tracks, making it the most-streamed album of that week. In its second week, the album remained at number four on the chart, earning an additional 71,000 album-equivalent units that week. In its third week, the album dropped to number six on the chart, earning 56,000 album-equivalent units that week. In its fourth week, the album remained at number six on the chart, earning an additional 49,000 album-equivalent units, bringing its four-week total to 306,000 album-equivalent units. On September 27, 2019, the album was certified platinum by the Recording Industry Association of America (RIAA) for combined sales and album-equivalent units of over a million units in the United States.

== Track listing ==
Credits adapted from Tidal and BMI.

No.	Title	Writer(s)	Producer(s)	Length
1.	"Off White Vlone" (featuring Lil Durk and Nav)	Dominique Jones; Sergio Kitchens; Durk Banks; Navraj Goraya; Chandler Durham	Turbo	3:07
2.	"Business Is Business"	D. Jones; Kitchens; Durham; Danny Snodgrass, Jr.; Dorien Theus	Turbo; Taz Taylor^{[a]}; Sidepce^{[a]}	2:42
3.	"Belly"	D. Jones; Kitchens; Durham	Turbo	3:11
4.	"Deep End" (performed by Lil Baby)	D. Jones; Chris Rosser; Carlos Gary	Quay Global; Loso	2:54
5.	"World Is Yours" (performed by Gunna)	Kitchens; Wesley Glass; Branden Brown	Wheezy; B Rackz	2:37
6.	"Underdog"	D. Jones; Kitchens; Glass; June James; Matthew Robinson	Wheezy; James; Mattazik Muzik	3:31
7.	"I Am"	D. Jones; Kitchens; Rosser	Quay Global	2:25
8.	"Seals Pills"	D. Jones; Kitchens; Wesley Jones	Jet	2:56
9.	"My Jeans" (featuring Young Thug)	D. Jones; Kitchens; Jeffery Williams; Durham; Glass	Turbo; Wheezy	3:16
10.	"Style Stealer" (performed by Gunna)	Kitchens; Durham; Adam Feeney	Turbo; Frank Dukes	3:05
11.	"Close Friends" (performed by Lil Baby)	D. Jones; Durham	Turbo	3:23
12.	"Drip Too Hard"	D. Jones; Kitchens; Durham	Turbo	2:25
13.	"Never Recover" (with Drake)	D. Jones; Kitchens; Aubrey Graham; Brytavious Chambers; Durham	Tay Keith; Turbo	3:14
Total length:				38:47

Notes

- ^{^[a]} signifies an uncredited co-producer.
- "Off White Vlone" is stylized as "Off White VLONE".

== Personnel ==
Credits adapted from Tidal.

Instrumentation

- Ghetto Guitar - guitar (track 3)
- Michael Ferguson - guitar (track 6)
- Ramiro Morales - guitar (track 6)

Technical

- Fabian Marasciullo – mixing (tracks 1–3, 5–9, 11, 13)
- Turbo – engineer (tracks 1, 4, 6, 7, 11), mixing (tracks 4, 10)
- Michael "MikFly" Dottin – mixing (track 12)
- McCoy Socalgargoyle – mixing assistance (tracks 1–3, 5–9, 11, 13)
- Colin Leonard – mastering (all tracks)
- Quay Global – engineer (tracks 1, 4, 6, 7, 11)

== Charts ==
=== Weekly charts ===
Chart (2018-2020)	Peak position
Australian Albums (ARIA)	45
Belgian Albums (Ultratop Flanders)	56
Belgian Albums (Ultratop Wallonia)	121
Canadian Albums (Billboard)	3
Dutch Albums (Album Top 100)	20
Finnish Albums (Suomen virallinen lista)	48
Irish Albums (IRMA)	39
Italian Albums (FIMI)	92
Norwegian Albums (VG-lista)	18
Swedish Albums (Sverigetopplistan)	26
Swiss Albums (Schweizer Hitparade)	82
UK Albums (OCC)	12
US Billboard 200	4
US Top R&B/Hip-Hop Albums (Billboard)	2

=== Year-end charts ===
Chart (2018)	Position
US Billboard 200	102
US Top R&B/Hip-Hop Albums (Billboard)	41

Chart (2019)	Position
Canadian Albums (Billboard)	36
US Billboard 200	23
US Top R&B/Hip-Hop Albums (Billboard)	14

Chart (2020)	Position
US Billboard 200	114

=== Decade-end charts ===
Chart (2010–2019)	Position
US Billboard 200	154

== Certifications ==
Region	Certification	Certified units/sales
Canada (Music Canada)	Gold	40,000^{‡}
Denmark (IFPI Danmark)	Gold	10,000^{‡}
United Kingdom (BPI)	Silver	60,000^{‡}
United States (RIAA)	Platinum	1,000,000^{‡}
^{‡} Sales+streaming figures based on certification alone.
