= Renni Rucci =

American rapper (born 1991)

- Born: Courtney Rene Donelson; October 2, 1991 (age 34); Columbia, South Carolina, U.S.
- Genres: Southern hip-hop
- Occupations: Rapper
- Label: Wolfpack

Courtney Rene Donelson (born October 2, 1991), known professionally as Renni Rucci, is an American rapper from Columbia, South Carolina.

== Early life ==
Courtney Rene Donelson was born in 1991 and raised in Hopkins, South Carolina.

== Career ==
Renni Rucci began to treat music seriously in 2017, performing freestyles over popular beats. In 2018, she achieved success for the first time by rapping over the beat of "Freestyle" by Lil' Baby. XXL noted that the video of her rapping over the aforementioned song has been viewed over five million times on YouTube. In 2019, Renni Rucci released her first mixtape, Big Renni, which was followed by QuickTape in 2020. In 2021, Renni Rucci was added to the cast of the reality TV show Love & Hip Hop: Atlanta. On March 18, 2022, she released the single "Don't Like Me". On October 28, Renni Rucci released "Keep the Change".

== Personal life ==
She has two older children from her previous relationship. Courtney Rene is in a relationship with South Carolina rapper Blacc Zacc. The couple have a son in 2024. In February 2026, Courtney announced that she is pregnant with their second child, her fourth and due in July. Courtney gave birth to another boy in July 6.

== Discography ==
=== Mixtapes ===
- Big Renni (2019)
- QuickTape (2020)

== Filmography ==
List of television shows, showing year aired, character played and notes
Year	TV show	Role	Notes	Ref.
2021–2026	Love & Hip Hop: Atlanta	Herself	Supporting role (Seasons 10–13)	
