= Insecurity =

Insecure may refer to:

- Lack of security, in an objective sense:
  - Risk
  - Data security
  - Computer security
- Insecurity (emotion), lack of confidence or self esteem

== Media ==
- Insecure (TV series), a television series on HBO
- InSecurity, a Canadian television sitcom
- "Insecurity" (South Park), a 2012 episode of the animated sitcom South Park
- Insecure (film), a 2014 French drama film

== Music ==
- "insecurity", a 2022 song by Indian singer Aaliyah Qureishi
- "Insecurities" (song), by Lil Baby
- "Insecurities", song by Freddie Gibbs from his album Shadow of a Doubt
- "Insecurities", song by Jess Glynne from her album Always In Between
- "Insecurities", song by Lil Tecca from his album Virgo World
- "Insecurities", song by Syd from his album Fin

== See also ==
- InSec, internal security
