= Lil Baby =

American rapper (born 1994)

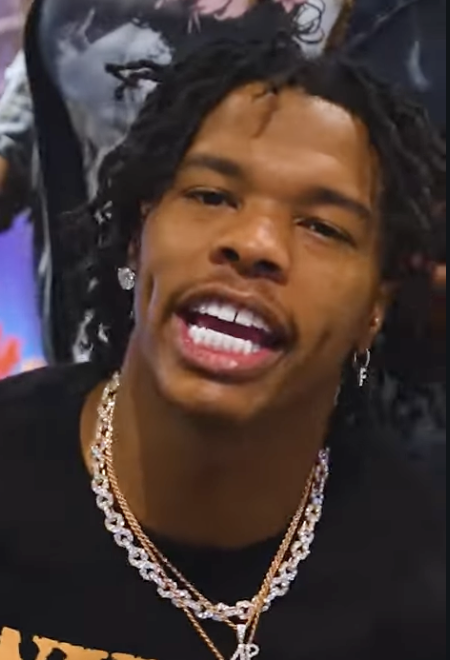
- Lil Baby in 2023

Background information
- Born: Dominique Armani Jones; December 3, 1994 (age 31); Atlanta, Georgia, U.S.
- Genres: Southern hip-hop; trap
- Occupations: Rapper; singer; songwriter
- Works: Lil Baby discography
- Years active: 2015–present
- Labels: Capitol; Motown; Quality Control; Glass Window (4PF); Wolfpack; YSL
- Children: 2
- Website: iamlilbaby.com

Logo
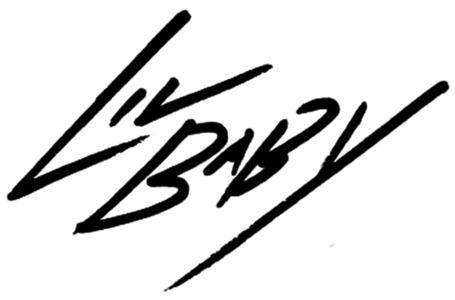

Dominique Armani Jones (born December 3, 1994), known professionally as Lil Baby, is an American rapper, singer, and songwriter. He rose to prominence following the release of his 2017 mixtapes Harder than Hard and Too Hard — the former of which spawned his first Billboard Hot 100 entry with its lead single, "My Dawg." He signed with Quality Control Music, an imprint of Motown and Capitol Records to release his debut studio album Harder Than Ever (2018), which peaked at number three on the Billboard 200 and was supported by the Billboard Hot 100-top ten single "Yes Indeed" (with Drake). Later that year, he released the collaborative mixtape Drip Harder with fellow Georgia-based rapper Gunna, and his solo mixtape Street Gossip; the former spawned his second top-ten single "Drip Too Hard", while the latter peaked at number two on the Billboard 200.

Lil Baby's second studio album, My Turn (2020), peaked the Billboard 200 for five weeks, received quadruple platinum certification by the Recording Industry Association of America (RIAA), and became the best-selling album of that year. It spawned the hit song "We Paid" (with 42 Dugg), as well as the George Floyd protest-inspired single "The Bigger Picture"; both peaked within the top ten of the Billboard Hot 100, while the latter received two nominations—Best Rap Song and Best Rap Performance—at the 63rd Annual Grammy Awards. The following year, his collaborative album The Voice of the Heroes (2021) with Chicago rapper Lil Durk became his second project to peak the Billboard 200, while his guest appearance on Kanye West and the Weeknd's 2021 single, "Hurricane", won Best Melodic Rap Performance at the 64th Grammy Awards. His third and fourth albums, It's Only Me (2022) and WHAM (2025), both debuted atop the Billboard 200; the former spawned three Billboard Hot 100 top-ten entries: "California Breeze", "Forever" (featuring Fridayy), and "Real Spill", while the latter album spawned the top-20 single "Dum, Dumb, and Dumber" (with Future and Young Thug).

In addition to a Grammy Award, Lil Baby has won an MTV Video Music Award, two BET Awards, and was named the all-genre Artist of the Year at the 2020 Apple Music Awards. He founded the record label Glass Window Entertainment (known previously as 4PF) as an imprint of Motown and Capitol in 2023; he has signed frequent collaborators 42 Dugg and Rylo Rodriguez.

== Early life ==
Jones was born and raised in the Oakland City neighborhood in Southwest Atlanta, Georgia. He was two years old when his father left the family. His mother raised him and his two sisters. He dropped out of Booker T. Washington High School in ninth grade and committed to drug dealing.

In early 2012, he was charged for possession with intent to sell, among other charges. In 2013, was charged with possession of marijuana of less than an ounce. In 2014, he was arrested on charges of possession of marijuana with intent to sell, and was incarcerated for two years.

== Career ==
=== 2015–2018: Career beginnings and Harder Than Ever ===
At age seventeen, Lil Baby was a regular presence in the studio of Atlanta-based Quality Control Records as a drug dealer. Label founder Kevin "Coach K" Lee encouraged him to become a rapper, as he felt Baby had "the swag... the lingo, [and] respect around the city". Fellow rappers Young Thug and Gunna served as Baby's mentors in developing his style. He released his first mixtape, Perfect Timing, in April 2017 with appearances from Young Thug, Gunna, and Lil Yachty.

Another mixtape, Harder Than Hard, followed in August 2017. In October, he released his third mixtape in six months, 2 The Hard Way, a collaboration with friend and fellow Atlanta rapper Marlo. A fourth mixtape, Too Hard, was released in December, led by his hit single "Freestyle" and accompanying music video. It was certified gold by the RIAA in February 2020.

With his career gaining momentum, Baby released his debut studio album, Harder Than Ever, in May 2018. It debuted at number three on the US Billboard 200. The album was supported by the singles "Southside" and "Yes Indeed" (with Drake), the latter peaked at number six on the Billboard Hot 100. "Life Goes On" featuring Gunna and Lil Uzi Vert charted at 74 on the Billboard Hot 100.

Lil Baby formed his own label, 4 Pockets Full (initialized 4PF) in 2017. Rappers 42 Dugg and Rylo Rodriguez are signed to the label. In 2023, the label was renamed to Glass Window Entertainment.

=== 2018–2019: Drip Harder and Street Gossip ===
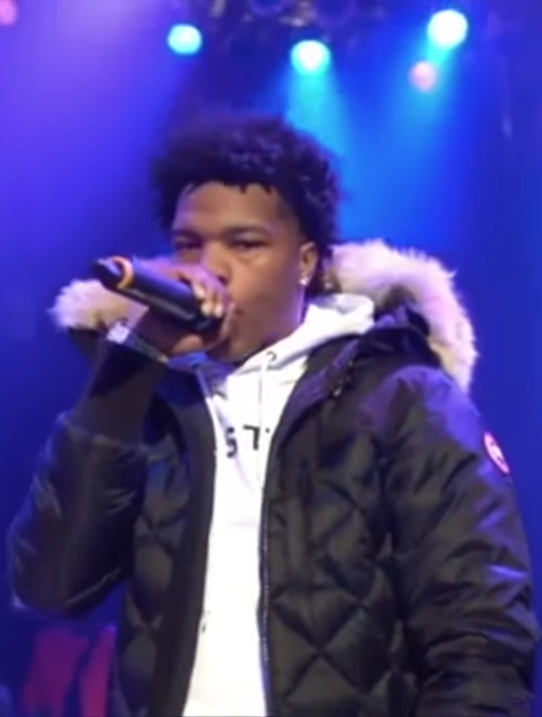
Lil Baby in 2018

After Lil Baby released Harder Than Ever, he released the collaborative mixtape Drip Harder with Gunna on October 5, 2018. The lead single, "Drip Too Hard" went on to become certified Diamond by the RIAA and 4× Platinum by Music Canada. The song peaked at number 4 on the Billboard Hot 100 and was nominated for Best Rap/Sung Performance at the 62nd Annual Grammy Awards. The mixtape was released under the labels Quality Control, YSL Records and Motown/Capitol.

In September 2018, Baby appeared on the Adult Swim television series FishCenter Live. In November 2018, he released his mixtape Street Gossip. In December 2018, Baby collaborated with Yung Gravy on the latter's single, "Alley Oop".

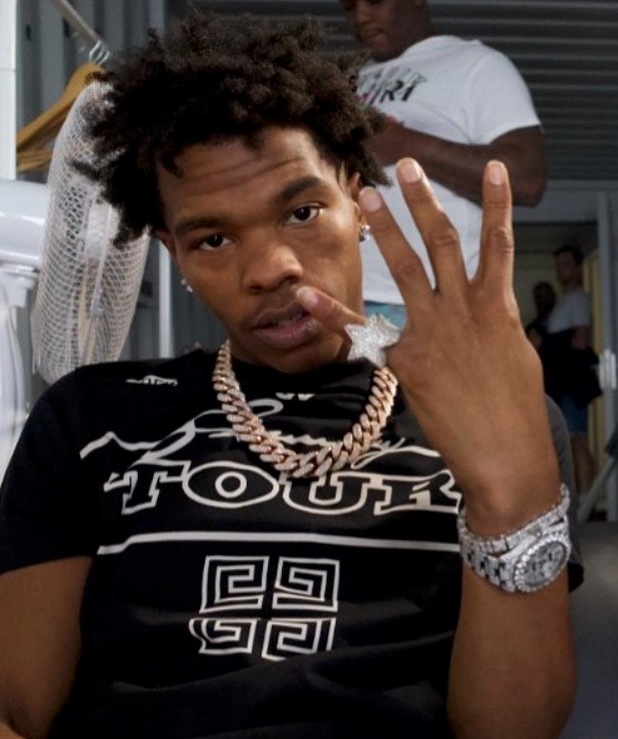
Lil Baby in 2019

He starred in the 2019 film How High 2, a sequel to the 2001 stoner film How High, which premiered in April 2019, on MTV. In June 2019, Baby and Future released a single titled "Out the Mud". In July 2019, Lil Baby appeared alongside DaBaby on the single "Baby", released on Quality Control's second studio album, Control the Streets, Volume 2. The song peaked at number 21 on the Billboard Hot 100.

In November 2019, Baby released his single "Woah" as the lead single for his second studio album My Turn. The song peaked at number 15 on the Billboard Hot 100. Baby was featured on YouTuber KSI's track "Down Like That" with Rick Ross and British producer S-X, and performed it for KSI's boxing match against Logan Paul. In November 2019, Baby released a song from the film Queen & Slim titled "Catch the Sun", which subsequently appeared on My Turn.

=== 2020–2022: My Turn, The Voice of the Heroes, and It's Only Me ===
In January 2020, Lil Baby released the second single ("Sum 2 Prove"), for his at-the-time upcoming album, and it reached number 16 on the Hot 100. The album, My Turn, was released in February 2020, and debuted at number one on the US Billboard 200. It features guest appearances from Gunna, 42 Dugg, Future, Lil Uzi Vert, Lil Wayne, Moneybagg Yo, Young Thug and Rylo Rodriguez. My Turn produced 12 songs that appeared the Billboard Hot 100 chart, giving him a career total of 47 songs on the chart, tying him with Prince and Paul McCartney.

Following the release of the album's deluxe version on May 1, My Turn returned to the top spot on the Billboard 200. In June 2020, Lil Baby released the political track "The Bigger Picture", amid the George Floyd protests. The song debuted at number three on the Billboard Hot 100, becoming Lil Baby's highest-charting song as a lead artist.

On June 26, 2020, Lil Baby was featured on Lil Mosey's single "Back at It"— which would appear as the lead single of Mosey's deluxe edition of Certified Hitmaker. Lil Baby’s song "We Paid" featuring 42 Dugg from the deluxe reissue of My Turn peaked within the top-ten of the Hot 100. In July 2020, Lil Baby was featured on Pop Smoke's "For the Night", from his posthumous debut album, Shoot for the Stars, Aim for the Moon. The track reached number six on the Hot 100. In September 2020, My Turn became the first album of the year to be certified double platinum by the RIAA. "The Bigger Picture" received two nominations at the 63rd Annual Grammy Awards: Best Rap Performance and Best Rap Song.

In March 2021, Lil Baby performed "The Bigger Picture" at the Grammy Awards in 2021 to mostly positive reviews. The following day, another collaboration with Drake, "Wants and Needs", debuted at number two on the Billboard Hot 100. Passing a previous peak and debut with "The Bigger Picture" for Jones, becoming his highest-charting song overall. In June 2021, Lil Baby released his collaborative studio album with Lil Durk, The Voice of the Heroes. The album debuted at number one on the Billboard 200.

In September 2021, Lil Baby was featured on the song "Girls Want Girls" from Drake's sixth studio album, Certified Lover Boy. The song debuted and peaked at number two on the Billboard Hot 100, tying their previous collaboration "Wants and Needs" as Baby's highest-charting song overall. On December 16, 2021, Lil Baby was featured on the song “Moved to Miami” by Roddy Ricch from Ricch’s second studio album Live Life Fast— the track would later peak at number 85 on the Billboard Hot 100. In February 2022, "Do We Have a Problem?" – a collaboration with Nicki Minaj was released, along with a music video starring the two. In March 2022, Lil Baby was announced as one of the headliners for J. Cole's Dreamville 2022 Music Festival. Lil Baby is the subject of the documentary film Untrapped: The Story of Lil Baby, directed by Karam Gill, which premiered at the Tribeca Film Festival in June 2022 and was released on Amazon Prime Video in August 2022.

In April 2022, Lil Baby released the singles "In A Minute", and "Right On", which peaked at number 14 and 13 respectively on the Billboard Hot 100. In September, he released the promotional single "Detox". In October, he released the single "Heyy" as the second single to his forthcoming album It's Only Me. The album released four days later and became his third consecutive number one album.

=== 2023–present: WHAM and The Leaks ===
In January 2023, Lil Baby was featured twice on Trippie Redd's comeback album, Mansion Musik. In March, he appeared as a feature on Nardo Wick's "Hot Boy". In April, he released the previously teased single, "Go Hard", before appearing as a feature om Gucci Mane's "Bluffin" in June. In the following month, he released "Merch Madness". On August 18, 2023, Lil Baby was featured on singer Ciara's single "Forever".

Lil Baby began to roll out his fourth studio album in December with the release of "Crazy" and "350" which were met with negative critical reception and mediocre commercial performance, leading to delays.

In April 2024, Baby appeared on Future and Metro Boomin's collaborative studio album, We Still Don't Trust You on the album's twenty-first cut, "All My Life". The following month, Baby appeared alongside, "Band4Band", the lead single from UK rapper Central Cee's debut studio album, Can't Rush Greatness (2025). The track peaked at number 3 on the UK singles chart, at number 12 on the Billboard Global 200, and number 18 on the Billboard Hot 100, before being certified gold by the BPI and platinum by the RIAA.

In November 2024, Baby started to roll out his fourth studio album with the release of the promotional singles, "5AM", "Insecurities", and "Touchdown" in December of that year.

On January 3, 2025, Lil Baby released his fourth studio album, WHAM featuring guest appearances from Young Thug, Future, GloRilla, Rylo Rodriguez, Rod Wave, Travis Scott, and 21 Savage. The album debuted at number 1 on the Billboard 200, moving 140,000 album-equivalent units in its first week, beating out Bad Bunny's sixth album, Debí Tirar Más Fotos by 18,000 units. Shortly after the release of WHAM, Lil Baby announced that he would be releasing Dominique as a companion album to WHAM in the following month. The album was reportedly cancelled in August 2025, with Lil Baby instead announcing an album titled The Leaks. After some revision to the track list, Lil Baby officially releases The Leaks to streaming platforms on December 3, 2025, which is also the day of Baby's birthday, where he turns 31.

== Personal life ==
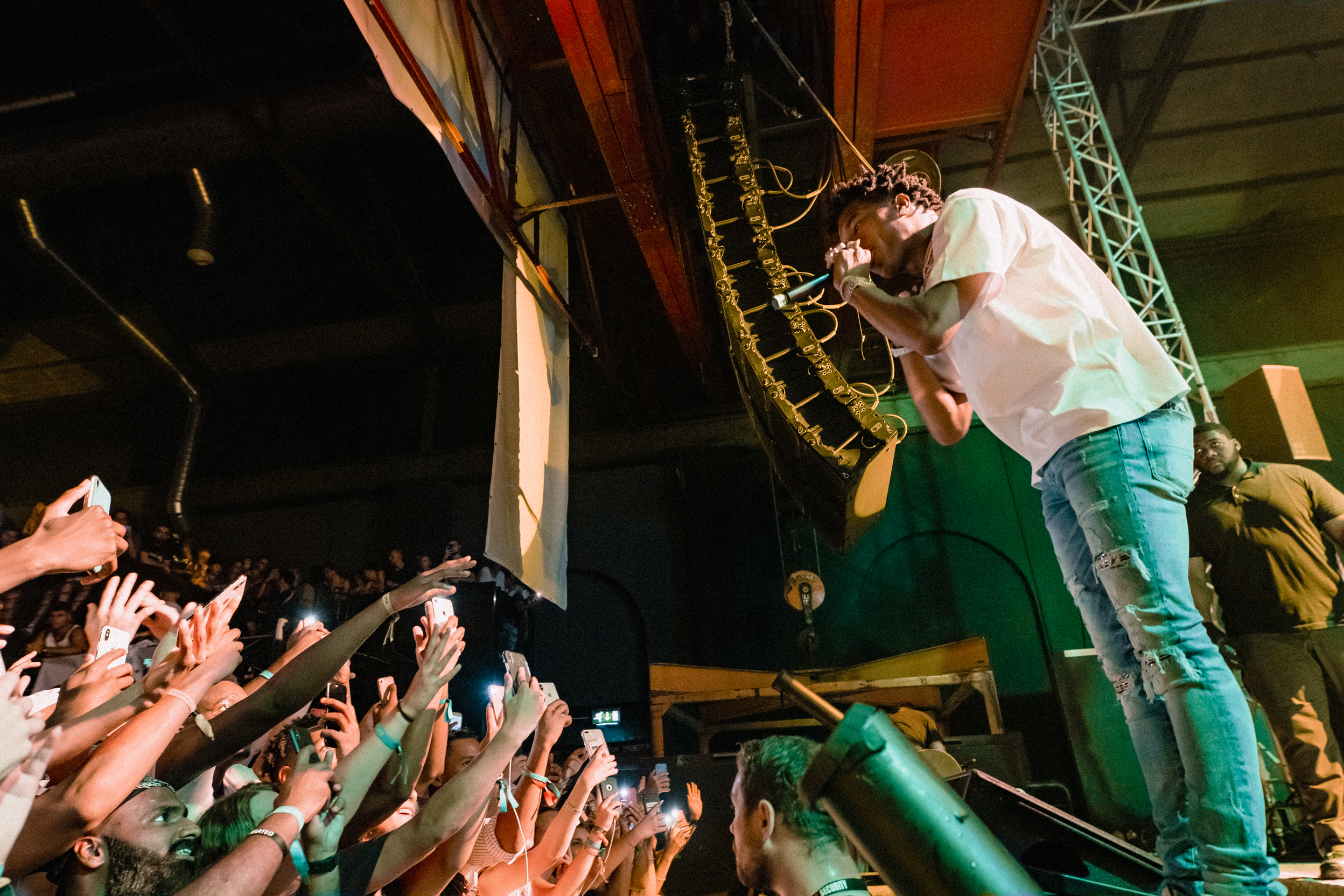
Lil Baby performing in August 2019

Jones has a son from a relationship with former girlfriend Ayesha. He later dated entrepreneur Jayda Cheaves. She appeared in the music video for his song "Close Friends". On February 18, 2019, Cheaves gave birth to their son.

In May 2021, Jones visited the White House along with the family of George Floyd on the anniversary of Floyd's murder.

On July 7, 2021, after attending Paris Fashion Week events with basketball player James Harden, Jones was arrested on a drug charge by police in the 8th arrondissement of Paris. Harden was stopped but not detained, and both men were soon released. For this offense, Jones agreed to pay a fine.

On August 26, 2024, Jones was arrested in Las Vegas on a concealed weapons charge. He was detained at Clark County Detention Center, and was soon afterwards released after posting a $5,000 bond.

== Discography ==
Studio albums

- Harder Than Ever (2018)
- My Turn (2020)
- It's Only Me (2022)
- WHAM (2025)
- Fresh (2026)

Collaborative albums

- The Voice of the Heroes (with Lil Durk) (2021)

== Filmography ==
- How High 2 (2019; as himself)
- Untrapped: The Story of Lil Baby (2022; as himself)

== Awards and nominations ==
Award nominations for Lil Baby
Award	Year (Note: Indicates the year of ceremony. Each year is linked to the article about the awards held that year, wherever possible.)	Recipient(s) and nominee(s)	Category	Result	Ref.
American Music Awards	2020	Himself	New Artist of the Year	Nominated	
American Music Awards	2020	"My Turn"	Favorite Rap/Hip-Hop Album	Nominated	
American Music Awards	2021	Himself	Favorite Rap/Hip-Hop Artist	Nominated	
ASCAP Rhythm & Soul Music Awards	2021	Songwriter of the year	Himself	Won	
ASCAP Rhythm & Soul Music Awards	2021	Winning Rap Songs	Baby	Won	
ASCAP Rhythm & Soul Music Awards	2021	Winning Rap Songs	The Bigger Picture	Won	
ASCAP Rhythm & Soul Music Awards	2021	Winning Rap Songs	Emotionally Scarred	Won	
ASCAP Rhythm & Soul Music Awards	2021	Winning Rap Songs	For The Night	Won	
ASCAP Rhythm & Soul Music Awards	2021	Winning Rap Songs	Leave Em Alone	Won	
ASCAP Rhythm & Soul Music Awards	2021	Winning Rap Songs	Sum 2 Prove	Won	
ASCAP Rhythm & Soul Music Awards	2021	Winning Rap Songs	We Paid	Won	
ASCAP Rhythm & Soul Music Awards	2021	Winning Rap Songs	WOAH	Won	
ASCAP Rhythm & Soul Music Awards	2022	Songwriter of the year	Himself	Won	
ASCAP Rhythm & Soul Music Awards	2022	Winning Rap Songs	Every Chance I Get	Won	
ASCAP Rhythm & Soul Music Awards	2022	Winning Rap Songs	Girls Want Girls	Won	
ASCAP Rhythm & Soul Music Awards	2022	Winning Rap Songs	On Me	Won	
ASCAP Rhythm & Soul Music Awards	2022	Winning Rap Songs	Rags2Riches 2	Won	
ASCAP Rhythm & Soul Music Awards	2022	Winning Rap Songs	Wants And Needs	Won	
ASCAP Rhythm & Soul Music Awards	2024	Songwriter of the year	Himself	Won	
ASCAP Rhythm & Soul Music Awards	2024	Winning Rap Songs	HEYY	Won	
ASCAP Rhythm & Soul Music Awards	2024	Winning Rap Songs	Hurricane	Won	
ASCAP Rhythm & Soul Music Awards	2024	Winning Rap Songs	Forever	Won	
ASCAP Rhythm & Soul Music Awards	2024	Winning Rap Songs	Freestyle	Won	
Berlin Music Video Awards	2024	Pepper (with Flowdan, Skrillex)	Best Cinematography	Nominated	
BET Awards	2019	Himself	Best New Artist	Won	
BET Awards	2019	Himself & Gunna	Best Group	Nominated	
BET Awards	2021	Himself	Best Male Hip Hop Artist	Won	
BET Awards	2021	"For the Night" (Pop Smoke featuring Lil Baby and DaBaby)	Best Collaboration	Nominated	
BET Awards	2021	"The Bigger Picture"	Coca-Cola Viewers' Choice Award	Nominated	
BET Awards	2022	Himself	Best Male Hip Hop Artist	Nominated	
BET Awards	2022	Lil Baby & Lil Durk	Best Group	Nominated	
BET Awards	2022	"Every Chance I Get" (with Lil Durk & DJ Khaled)	Best Collaboration	Nominated	
BET Awards	2022	"We Win" (with Kirk Franklin)	Dr. Bobby Jones Best Gospel/Inspirational Award	Won	
BET Awards	2023	Himself	Best Male Hip Hop Artist	Nominated	
BET Hip Hop Awards	2019	"Drip Too Hard" (with Gunna)	Best Collab, Duo or Group	Nominated	
BET Hip Hop Awards	2020	"The Bigger Picture"	Best Hip Hop Video	Nominated	
BET Hip Hop Awards	2020	"The Bigger Picture"	Impact Track	Won	
BET Hip Hop Awards	2020	Himself	Hip-Hop Artist of the Year	Nominated	
BET Hip Hop Awards	2020	"My Turn"	Hip-Hop Album of the Year	Nominated	
BET Hip Hop Awards	2021	Himself	Hip-Hop Artist of the Year	Won	
BET Hip Hop Awards	2021	"Every Chance I Get" (with Lil Durk)	Best Collaboration	Nominated	
BET Hip Hop Awards	2021	Lil Baby & Lil Durk	Best Duo or Group	Won	
BET Hip Hop Awards	2021	Himself	Lyricist of the year	Nominated	
BET Hip Hop Awards	2021	Himself	Hustler of the year	Nominated	
BET Hip Hop Awards	2021	"We Win" (with Kirk Franklin)	Impact Track	Nominated	
BET Hip Hop Awards	2022	Girls Want Girls	Sweet 16: Best Featured Verse	Nominated	
Billboard Music Awards	2019	Himself	Top New Artist	Nominated	
Billboard Music Awards	2021	Himself	Top Male Artist	Nominated	
Billboard Music Awards	2021	Himself	Top Streaming Songs Artist	Nominated	
Billboard Music Awards	2021	Himself	Top Rap Artist	Nominated	
Billboard Music Awards	2021	Himself	Top Rap Male Artist	Nominated	
Billboard Music Awards	2021	"My Turn"	Top Billboard 200 Album	Nominated	
Billboard Music Awards	2021	"My Turn"	Top Rap Album	Nominated	
Billboard Music Awards	2022	Himself	Top Rap Artist	Nominated	
Billboard Music Awards	2022	The Back Outside Tour	Top Rap Tour	Nominated	
Grammy Awards	2020	"Drip Too Hard" (with Gunna)	Best Rap/Sung Performance	Nominated	
Grammy Awards	2021	"The Bigger Picture"	Best Rap Performance	Nominated	
Grammy Awards	2021	"The Bigger Picture"	Best Rap Song	Nominated	
Grammy Awards	2022	Back of My Mind (as featured artist and songwriter)	Album of the Year	Nominated	
Grammy Awards	2022	Donda (as featured artist and songwriter)	Album of the Year	Nominated	
Grammy Awards	2022	"We Win" (with Kirk Franklin)	Best Contemporary Christian Music Performance/Song	Nominated	
Grammy Awards	2022	"Hurricane" (with Kanye West and The Weeknd)	Best Melodic Rap Performance	Won	
Grammy Awards	2022	"Pride Is The Devil" (with J. Cole)	Best Melodic Rap Performance	Nominated	
IHeartRadio Music Awards	2021	Himself	Hip-Hop Artist of the Year	Nominated	
IHeartRadio Music Awards	2021	"My Turn"	Hip-Hop Album of the Year	Won	
MTV Video Music Awards	2020	"The Bigger Picture"	Best Video with a Social Message	Nominated	
MTV Video Music Awards	2020	"We Paid" (Feat 42 Dugg)	Song of Summer	Nominated	
MTV Video Music Awards	2021	"On Me" (Feat Megan Thee Stallion)	Best Hip Hop	Nominated	
MTV Video Music Awards	2022	"Do We Have a Problem?"	Best Hip Hop	Won	
XXL Awards	2022	Himself	Male Rapper Of The Year	Nominated	
XXL Awards	2022	Himself	Lyricist Of The Year	Nominated	
XXL Awards	2022	Himself	Performer Of The Year	Nominated	
XXL Awards	2022	Himself	The People's Champ	Nominated	
XXL Awards	2022	"Every Chance I Get" (with Lil Durk)	Song of the Year	Won	

== Tours ==
=== Headlining ===
- The Back Outside Tour (2021)
- It's Only Us Tour (2023)
- WHAM World Tour (2025)

=== Co-headlining ===
- One Of Them Ones Tour (with Chris Brown) (2022)
