= Quality Control Music =

American record label from Atlanta, Georgia

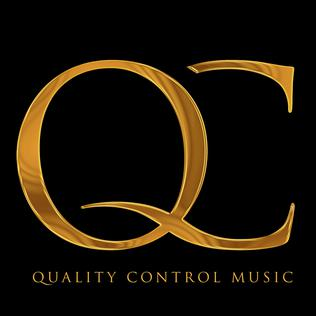
- Parent company: Hybe America (HYBE)
- Founded: March 2013; 13 years ago
- Founder: Kevin Lee; Pierre Thomas
- Status: Active
- Distributors: Capitol (2017–2020); Motown
- Genre: Hip hop; trap; R&B
- Location: Atlanta, Georgia, U.S.
- Official website: qualitycontrolmusic.com

Quality Control Music, LLC (also known as Quality Control or QC) is an American hip hop record label based in Atlanta, Georgia. It was founded in 2013 by Kevin "Coach K" Lee (COO) and Pierre "P" Thomas (CEO) in March 2013. From 2017 until 2020, the label's releases were distributed through Capitol Records, and are currently distributed through Motown Records, both of which are owned by Universal Music Group. Tamika Howard and Simone Mitchell are executives of the label, with Howard serving as its general manager.

The label has many acts signed, including Migos, City Girls, Lil Yachty and Lil Baby. The label also formerly had Cardi B signed under a management deal.

== History ==
Kevin Lee and Pierre Thomas initially established Quality Control Music by hiring radio and promotion staff, while they personally ventured into publishing and management. They invested $1 million and one year into building a headquarters in the western part of Atlanta, which holds four recording studios and office spaces.

In 2020, Migos brought a lawsuit against the company.

On February 8, 2023, Quality Control's parent company, QC Media Holdings, was acquired by Hybe America for $300 million, with the founders maintaining control and reporting to the CEO, Scooter Braun.

== Roster ==
=== Notable current acts ===
Updated according to QC Music Artists.

==== Artists ====
- JT
- Quavo
- Lil Baby
- Lil Yachty
- Layton Greene
- Bankroll Freddie
- Baby Money
- Shaquees
- Bien

==== In-house producers ====
- OG Parker
- Quay Global

=== Notable former acts ===
- City Girls
- Offset
- Rich the Kid
- Cardi B
- OG Maco (deceased)
- Young Greatness (deceased)
- Takeoff (deceased)
- Renni Rucci
- Stefflon Don
- Duke Deuce
- Lakeyah
- Gloss Up
- Yung Miami
- Migos

== Discography ==
=== Compilation albums ===
List of albums, with selected chart positions
Title	Album details	Peak chart positions			
Title	Album details	US	US R&B/HH	CAN	NZ
Control the Streets, Volume 1	Released: December 10, 2017; Label: Quality Control, Capitol, Motown; Format: Digital download, streaming	5	1	17	—
Control the Streets, Volume 2	Released: August 16, 2019; Label: Quality Control, Motown; Format: Digital download, streaming	3	3	5	37

=== Mixtapes ===
List of mixtapes, with details
Title	Mixtape details
Solid Foundation	Released: February 3, 2014; Hosted by DJ Drama; Label: Quality Control Music; Format: Digital download

=== Singles ===
List of singles, with selected chart positions, showing year released and album name
Title	Year	Peak chart positions			Certifications	Album
Title	Year	US	US R&B/HH	CAN	Certifications	Album
"Too Hotty" (with Migos)	2017	91	37	—		Control the Streets, Volume 1
"On Me" (with Lil Yachty and Young Thug)	2017	—	—	—		Control the Streets, Volume 1
"My Dawg (Remix)" (with Lil Baby and Kodak Black featuring Quavo and Moneybagg Yo)	2017	—	—	—		Control the Streets, Volume 1
"Ice Tray" (with Quavo and Lil Yachty)	2017	74	30	67	MC: Gold	Control the Streets, Volume 1
"Fuck Dat Nigga" (with City Girls)	2017	—	—	—		Control the Streets, Volume 1
"Baby" (with Lil Baby and DaBaby)	2019	21	11	54		Control the Streets, Volume 2

== Quality Control Sports ==
In 2019, Kevin Lee and Pierre Thomas established Quality Control Sports, a sports management company. Quality Control Sports manages professional basketball, football and baseball players including Deebo Samuel Sr., Alvin Kamara, Diontae Johnson (Cleveland Browns) and Jarrett Allen.
