= Gunna discography =

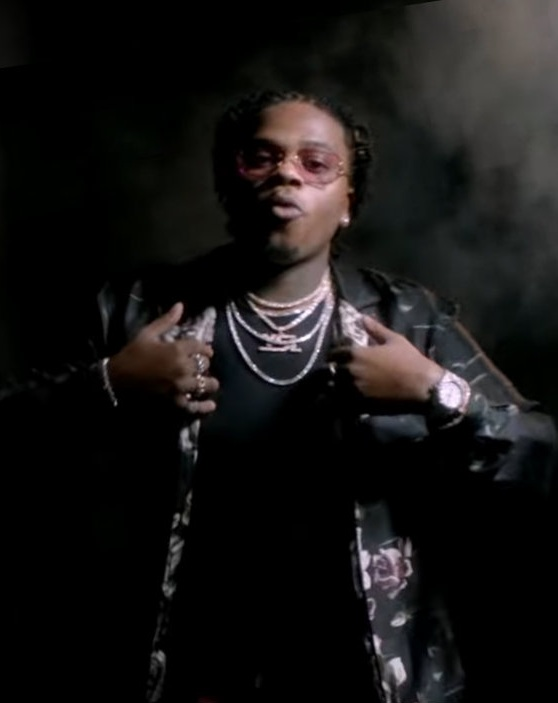
- Gunna in 2018
- Studio albums: 6
- EPs: 1
- Singles: 70
- Music videos: 22
- Mixtapes: 5
- Music videos: 22
- Collaborative mixtapes: 1

The discography of American rapper Gunna consists of six studio albums, one compilation album, five mixtapes, one extended play, and 141 singles (including 68 as a featured artist).

On October 14, 2016, Gunna released his debut commercial mixtape, Drip Season. On May 11, 2017, he released his second commercial mixtape, Drip Season 2, a sequel to Drip Season. On November 30, 2017, Gunna released his debut extended play, Drip or Drown. On February 2, 2018, he released his third commercial mixtape, Drip Season 3, the third installment of his Drip Season series. The mixtape became his first project to chart on the Billboard 200, peaking at number 55 on the chart. On October 5, 2018, he released a collaborative mixtape with Lil Baby, Drip Harder. The mixtape peaked at number 4 on the Billboard 200. It produced the hit single, "Drip Too Hard", which peaked at number 4 on the Billboard Hot 100, giving him his highest-charting song in total. "Never Recover", a collaboration with Drake, another song from the mixtape, debuted and peaked at number 15 on the chart.

On February 22, 2019, Gunna released his debut studio album, Drip or Drown 2, a sequel to Drip or Drown. The album peaked at number 3 on the Billboard 200. The following year, he released a collaboration with Nav, "Turks", which features Travis Scott and debuted and peaked at number 17 on the Billboard Hot 100.

On May 22, 2020, Gunna released his second studio album, Wunna. The album debuted and peaked atop the Billboard 200, giving him his first chart-topping project. It produced the Top 40 single, "Dollaz on My Head", which features Young Thug and peaked at number 38 on the Hot 100. Later that year, he released a collaboration with Internet Money and Don Toliver, "Lemonade", which features Nav and reached number 6 on the Hot 100. On April 16, 2021, Gunna released a collaborative compilation album with his record label, YSL Records, and boss of the label, Young Thug, Slime Language 2, a sequel to YSL and Thug's collaborative compilation album, Slime Language (2018). The album debuted and peaked atop on the Billboard 200, giving him his second chart-topping project overall, but he was not credited for the album on Billboard, who credited "Young Thug & Various Artists" instead. It produced the hit songs, "Ski" and "Solid", the latter of which features Drake; the songs debuted and peaked at numbers 18 and 12 on the Hot 100, respectively.

On January 7, 2022, Gunna released his third studio album, DS4Ever, which is an acronym for Drip Season 4Ever and is the fourth and final installment of his Drip Season series. The album debuted and peaked atop the Billboard 200, giving him his third chart-topping project overall and second chart-topping project that he is credited on Billboard for. It produced the hit single, "Too Easy", a collaboration with Future, which was released the previous year and peaked at number 16 on the Hot 100. "Pushin P", another collaboration with Future which also features Young Thug, another song from the album, debuted and peaked at number 7 on the chart. It also produced the top-30 songs, "Thought I Was Playing" (a collaboration with 21 Savage), "P Power" which features Drake, and "25K Jacket" which features Lil Baby; the songs debuted and peaked at numbers 23, 24, and 28 on the Hot 100, respectively.

On June 16, 2023, Gunna released his fourth studio album, A Gift & a Curse. The album debuted and peaked at number three on the Billboard 200. It produced the hit song "FukUMean" which reached number 4 on the Billboard Hot 100. It also produced the song, "Back to the Moon", which debuted and peaked at number 29 on the Hot 100.

On May 10, 2024, Gunna released his fifth studio album, One of Wun. The album debuted and peaked at number two on the Billboard 200. It also produced the song, its title track, which debuted and peaked at number 26 on the Hot 100.

On August 8, 2025, Gunna released his sixth studio album, The Last Wun. The album debuted and peaked at number 3 on the Billboard 200. It produced the hit song, "WGFT", which features Burna Boy, it peaked at number 16 on the Hot 100. It also produced the top-70 songs, “Just Say Dat”, “Sakpase” and “Forever Be Mine” featuring “Wizkid”. They debuted and peaked at number 46, 70, and 68 and on the Hot 100 respectively. The album serves as Gunna's final project under 300/YSL records.

Gunna has also been featured on several songs that have received mainstream success. In 2018, he appeared alongside Nav on Travis Scott's single, "Yosemite", which debuted and peaked at number 25 on the Billboard Hot 100. In 2019, he was featured on Chris Brown's single, "Heat", which reached number 39 on the Hot 100. That same year, Gunna was featured on Young Thug's single, "Hot", which charted at number 11 on the Hot 100 after being boosted by a remix that also features Travis Scott, giving him his highest-charting song as a featured artist. In 2020, he was featured alongside Roddy Ricch and London on da Track on A Boogie wit da Hoodie's single, "Numbers", which debuted and peaked at number 23 on the Hot 100. In 2022, Gunna was featured on Lil Durk's song, "What Happened to Virgil", which debuted and peaked at number 22 on the Hot 100. Later that year, he was featured alongside Young Thug on Future's song, "For a Nut", which debuted and peaked at number 24 on the Hot 100. In 2024, he was featured on Offset's single "Style Rare". In 2025 he was featured on "Way It Is" by Justin Bieber, which debuted and peaked at number 33 on the Hot 100. He was also featured on Offset's album "Kiari", and Kodak Black's project later in 2025.

== Albums ==
=== Studio albums ===
List of studio albums, with selected details, chart positions and certifications
Title	Album details	Peak chart positions										Certifications
Title	Album details	US	US R&B/HH	US Rap	BEL (FL)	CAN	FRA	IRE	NLD	NZ	UK	Certifications
Drip or Drown 2	Released: February 22, 2019; Label: YSL, 300; Format: CD, LP, digital download, streaming	3	1	1	45	5	79	63	19	35	24	RIAA: Platinum
Wunna	Released: May 22, 2020; Label: YSL, 300; Format: CD, LP, cassette, digital download, streaming	1	1	1	18	1	14	14	8	7	5	RIAA: Platinum; BPI: Silver; RMNZ: Gold; MC: Platinum
DS4Ever	Released: January 7, 2022; Label: YSL, 300; Format: CD, LP, cassette, digital download, streaming	1	1	1	9	2	22	6	5	11	4	RIAA: Platinum; BPI: Silver; RMNZ: Gold; MC: Platinum
A Gift & a Curse	Released: June 16, 2023; Label: Gunna Music, YSL, 300; Format: CD, LP, digital download, streaming	3	1	1	33	4	43	33	19	12	9	RIAA: Platinum; BPI: Silver; RMNZ: Gold; MC: Platinum
One of Wun	Released: May 10, 2024; Label: Gunna Music, YSL, 300; Format: CD, LP, digital download, streaming	2	1	1	19	5	50	14	7	10	4	BPI: Gold; RMNZ: Gold; MC: Platinum
The Last Wun	Released: August 8, 2025; Label: YSL, 300; Format: CD,LP,Digital download, streaming	3	1	1	26	6	52	28	10	16	9	BPI: Gold; RMNZ: Gold
Splurge	Scheduled: Late 2026; Label: Shady Baby Records, Atlantic; Format: Digital download, streaming	To be released										
"—" denotes a title that did not chart, or was not released in that territory.

=== Compilation albums ===
List of compilation albums, with selected details
Title	Album details	Peak chart positions	
Title	Album details	US	CAN
Slime Language 2 (with YSL Records and Young Thug)	Released: April 16, 2021; Label: YSL, 300, Atlantic; Format: CD, LP, Digital download, streaming	1	2

=== Mixtapes ===
List of mixtapes, with selected details and chart positions
Title	Mixtape details	Peak chart positions									Certifications
Title	Mixtape details	US	US R&B/HH	US Rap	AUS	IRE	NLD	NOR	SWE	UK	Certifications
Hard Body (as Yung Gunna)	Released: July 16, 2013; Label: SPC; Format: Digital download, streaming	—	—	—	—	—	—	—	—	—	
Drip Season	Released: October 14, 2016; Label: YSL, 300; Format: Digital download, streaming	—	—	—	—	—	—	—	—	—	
Drip Season 2	Released: May 11, 2017; Label: YSL, 300; Format: Digital download, streaming	—	—	—	—	—	—	—	—	—	
Drip Season 3	Released: February 2, 2018; Label: YSL, 300; Format: Digital download, streaming	55	25	20	—	—	—	—	—	—	RIAA: Gold
Drip Harder (with Lil Baby)	Released: October 5, 2018; Label: Quality Control, YSL, 300, Motown, Capitol; Format: CD, LP, digital download, streaming	4	2	2	45	39	20	18	26	12	RIAA: Platinum; BPI: Silver; MC: Gold
"—" denotes a recording that did not chart or was not released in that territory.

== Extended plays ==
Extended play, with selected details
Title	EP details
Drip or Drown	Released: November 30, 2017; Label: YSL, 300; Format: Digital download, streaming

== Singles ==
=== As lead artist ===
List of singles as lead artist, with selected chart positions, showing year released and album name
Title	Year	Peak chart positions										Certifications	Album
Title	Year	US	US R&B/HH	US Rap	AUS	CAN	FRA	IRE	NZ	UK	WW	Certifications	Album
"Beat the Case" (featuring Offset)	2017	—	—	—	—	—	—	—	—	—	—		Drip Season 2
"Back and Forth" (with Hoodrich Pablo Juan)	2017	—	—	—	—	—	—	—	—	—	—		Non-album singles
"Vibes in LA" (with Moneybagg Yo)	2017	—	—	—	—	—	—	—	—	—	—		Non-album singles
"Mind On a Milli" (featuring Hoodrich Pablo Juan)	2017	—	—	—	—	—	—	—	—	—	—		Non-album singles
"Rich Bitch"	2017	—	—	—	—	—	—	—	—	—	—		Non-album singles
"Cash 4 It" (with Spiffy Global featuring 24hrs)	2017	—	—	—	—	—	—	—	—	—	—		Non-album singles
"Almighty" (featuring Hoodrich Pablo Juan)	2018	—	—	—	—	—	—	—	—	—	—		Drip Season 3
"Sold Out Dates" (featuring Lil Baby)	2018	— (Note: "Sold Out Dates" did not enter the Billboard Hot 100, instead peaking at number 4 on the Bubbling Under Hot 100 chart.)	— (Note: "Sold Out Dates" did not enter the Billboard Hot R&B/Hip-Hop Songs chart, but peaked at number 3 on the Bubbling Under R&B/Hip-Hop Singles chart.)	—	—	—	—	—	—	—	—	RIAA: Platinum; BPI: Gold; MC: 3× Platinum; RMNZ: Gold	Non-album singles
"Need U" (with Fxxxxy)	2018	—	—	—	—	—	—	—	—	—	—		Non-album singles
"Drip Too Hard" (with Lil Baby)	2018	4	3	3	—	10	—	50	—	28	—	RIAA: Diamond (10× Platinum); BPI: 2× Platinum; BVMI: Gold; MC: 4× Platinum; RMNZ: 3× Platinum	Drip Harder
"One Call"	2019	56	23	20	—	78	—	—	— (Note: "One Call" did not enter the NZ Top 40 Singles Chart, but peaked at number 18 on the NZ Hot Singles Chart.)	—	—	RIAA: Gold	Drip or Drown 2
"Speed It Up"	2019	91	43	—	—	96	—	—	—	—	—	RIAA: Gold	Drip or Drown 2
"Don't Get Me Started" (with Pia Mia and Carnage)	2019	—	—	—	—	—	—	—	—	—	—		Non-album singles
"Cash Cow" (with Nghtmre)	2019	—	—	—	—	—	—	—	—	—	—		Non-album singles
"Skybox"	2020	65	30	—	—	—	—	—	— (Note: "Skybox" did not enter the NZ Top 40 Singles Chart, but peaked at number 24 on the NZ Hot Singles Chart.)	—	—	RIAA: Gold	Wunna
"Turks" (with Nav featuring Travis Scott)	2020	17	9	5	—	45	—	60	— (Note: "Turks" did not enter the NZ Top 40 Singles Chart, but peaked at number 5 on the NZ Hot Singles Chart.)	54	—	RIAA: 2× Platinum; MC: Platinum; RMNZ: Gold	Good Intentions
"Quarantine Clean" (with Turbo and Young Thug)	2020	—	—	—	—	—	—	—	— (Note: "Quarantine Clean" did not enter the NZ Top 40 Singles Chart, but peaked at number 36 on the NZ Hot Singles Chart.)	—	—		Non-album single
"Wunna"	2020	57	24	21	—	79	—	—	—	83	—	RIAA: Gold	Wunna
"Dollaz on My Head" (featuring Young Thug)	2020	38	15	13	—	53	—	—	— (Note: "Dollaz on My Head" did not enter the NZ Top 40 Singles Chart, but peaked at number 8 on the NZ Hot Singles Chart.)	84	—	RIAA: 3× Platinum; BPI: Silver; RMNZ: Platinum	Wunna
"Lemonade" (with Internet Money and Don Toliver featuring Nav)	2020	6	3	3	5	3	13	3	2	1	4	RIAA: 4× Platinum; ARIA: 3× Platinum; BVMI: Platinum; BPI: Platinum; MC: 4× Platinum; RMNZ: 4× Platinum; RMNZ: Platinum	B4 the Storm
"Famous" (with Octavian and Saint Jhn)	2020	—	—	—	—	—	—	—	—	—	—		Alpha
"Take It to Trial" (with YSL Records and Young Thug featuring Yak Gotti)	2020	— (Note: "Take It to Trial" did not enter the Billboard Hot 100, but peaked at number 2 on the Bubbling Under Hot 100 chart.)	33	—	—	—	—	—	—	—	—		Slime Language 2
"Young Wheezy" (with Nav)	2021	84	34	—	—	51	—	—	— (Note: "Young Wheezy" did not enter the NZ Top 40 Singles Chart, but peaked at number 31 on the NZ Hot Singles Chart.)	—	133		Emergency Tsunami
"Stackin It" (with Nechie)	2021	—	—	—	—	—	—	—	—	—	—		Shady Baby
"Repeat It" (with Lil Tecca)	2021	80	28	20	—	39	—	—	— (Note: "Repeat It" did not enter the NZ Top 40 Singles Chart, but peaked at number 13 on the NZ Hot Singles Chart.)	—	125	RIAA: Platinum; MC: Gold	We Love You Tecca 2
"9 Times Outta 10" (with Taurus)	2021	—	—	—	—	—	—	—	—	—	—		Non-album single
"Too Easy" (with Future)	2021	16	6	4	—	43	—	—	— (Note: "Too Easy" did not enter the NZ Top 40 Singles Chart, but peaked at number 12 on the NZ Hot Singles Chart.)	43	32	RIAA: Platinum	DS4Ever
"Banking on Me"	2022	61	20	15	—	62	—	—	— (Note: "Banking on Me" did not enter the NZ Top 40 Singles Chart, but peaked at number 12 on the NZ Hot Singles Chart.)	—	109	RIAA: Platinum; RMNZ: Gold	Non-album singles
"To the Moon" (Gunna Remix) (with JNR Choi and Sam Tompkins)	2022	—	—	—	—	—	—	—	—	—	—		Non-album singles
"Private Island – A Colors Show"	2022	—	—	—	—	—	—	—	—	—	—		Non-album singles
"Bromies" (with Ufo361)	2023	—	—	—	—	—	—	—	—	—	—		Love My Life
"Bread & Butter"	2023	48	16	10	—	56	—	—	— (Note: "Bread & Butter" did not enter the NZ Top 40 Singles Chart, but peaked at number 22 on the NZ Hot Singles Chart.)	63	111	RIAA: Gold; MC: Gold	A Gift & a Curse
"FukUMean"	2023	4	1	1	7	3	85	9	3	7	6	RIAA: 4× Platinum; ARIA: Platinum; BPI: Platinum; MC: 3× Platinum; RMNZ: 2× Platinum	A Gift & a Curse
"This Year (Blessings)" (Remix) (with Victor Thompson)	2023	—	—	—	—	—	—	—	—	—	—		Non-album singles
"Bachelor" (with Turbo)	2023	— (Note: "Bachelor" did not enter the Billboard Hot 100, but peaked at number 21 on the Bubbling Under Hot 100 chart.)	40	—	—	—	—	—	— (Note: "Bachelor" did not enter the NZ Top 40 Singles Chart, but peaked at number 19 on the NZ Hot Singles Chart.)	—	—		Non-album singles
"Bittersweet"	2024	82	32	—	—	—	—	—	— (Note: "Bittersweet" did not enter the NZ Top 40 Singles Chart, but peaked at number 38 on the NZ Hot Singles Chart.)	—	—		Non-album singles
"Prada Dem" (featuring Offset)	2024	54	20	15	—	60	—	—	— (Note: "Prada Dem" did not enter the NZ Top 40 Singles Chart, but peaked at number 7 on the NZ Hot Singles Chart.)	—	120	RIAA: Gold	One of Wun
"WhatsApp (Wassam)"	2024	62	24	21	—	94	—	—	— (Note: "Whatsapp (Wassam)" did not enter the NZ Top 40 Singles Chart, but peaked at number 27 on the NZ Hot Singles Chart.)	—	152	RMNZ: Gold	One of Wun
"Jump" (with Tyla and Skillibeng)	2024	—	49	—	—	87	—	66	— (Note: "Jump" did not enter the NZ Top 40 Singles Chart, but peaked at number 22 on the NZ Hot Singles Chart.)	38	195	RIAA: Gold; BPI: Silver; MC: Gold; RMNZ: Gold	Tyla
"One of Wun"	2024	26	9	7	68	34	—	52	— (Note: "One of Wun" did not enter the NZ Top 40 Singles Chart, but peaked at number nine on the NZ Hot Singles Chart.)	30	51	ARIA: Gold; BPI: Gold; RMNZ: Platinum; MC: 2× Platinum	One of Wun
"Tiffany" (with IDK)	2024	—	—	—	—	—	—	—	— (Note: "Tiffany" did not enter the NZ Top 40 Singles Chart, but peaked at number 26 on the NZ Hot Singles Chart.)	—	—		Non-album singles
"Style Rare" (with Offset)	2024	—	49	—	—	—	—	—	— (Note: "Style Rare" did not enter the NZ Top 40 Singles Chart, but peaked at number 38 on the NZ Hot Singles Chart.)	—	—		Non-album singles
"Him All Along"	2024	58	15	12	—	94	—	—	— (Note: "Him All Along" did not enter the NZ Top 40 Singles Chart, but peaked at number 16 on the NZ Hot Singles Chart.)	—	—		The Last Wun
"Got Damn"	2024	— (Note: "Got Damn" did not enter the Billboard Hot 100, but peaked at number 3 on the Bubbling Under Hot 100 chart.)	34	19	—	—	—	—	— (Note: "Got Damn" did not enter the NZ Top 40 Singles Chart, but peaked at number 19 on the NZ Hot Singles Chart.)	—	—		Non-album singles
"Classy Girl" (with Turbo)	2025	—	—	—	—	—	—	—	— (Note: "Classy Girl" did not enter the NZ Top 40 Singles Chart, but peaked at number 23 on the NZ Hot Singles Chart.)	—	—		Non-album singles
"Won't Stop"	2025	70	17	10	—	91	—	—	— (Note: "Won't Stop" did not enter the NZ Top 40 Singles Chart, but peaked at number 17 on the NZ Hot Singles Chart.)	—	—		The Last Wun
"WGFT" (featuring Burna Boy)	2025	16	5	2	96	46	—	82	29	22	60	BPI: Gold; RMNZ: Platinum	The Last Wun
"Speed" (with Teni)	2025	—	—	—	—	—	—	—	—	—	—		Non-album single
"No Rush" (with Dina Ayada)	2026	—	—	—	—	—	—	—	—	—	—		Identity
"WGFT (Remix)" (featuring Chris Brown)	2026	—	—	—	—	—	—	—	—	—	—		Non-album singles
"YK Where It's Goin" (with Hurricane Wisdom)	2026	—	—	—	—	—	—	—	—	—	—		Non-album singles
"High Noon" (with Shaboozey)	2026	—	—	—	—	—	—	—	—	—	—		Non-album singles
"Too Bad" (with Rich the Kid)	2026	—	—	—	—	—	—	—	—	—	—		Non-album singles
"Pop It"	2026	55	12	8	—	88	—	—	— (Note: "Pop It" did not enter the NZ Top 40 Singles Chart, but peaked at number 17 on the NZ Hot Singles Chart.)	—	—		Non-album singles
"—" denotes a recording that did not chart or was not released in that territory.

=== As featured artist ===
List of songs, with selected chart positions, showing year charted and album name
Title	Year	Peak chart positions										Certifications	Album
Title	Year	US	US R&B/HH	US Rap	AUS	CAN	FRA	IRE	NZ	UK	WW	Certifications	Album
"Pots & Pans" (SG featuring Gunna)	2017	—	—	—	—	—	—	—	—	—	—		Stress Virginia
"Bag" (Jose Guapo featuring Gunna and Lil Duke)	2017	—	—	—	—	—	—	—	—	—	—		Non-album singles
"Lead the Blind" (DJ Fly Guy featuring Gunna and Jay 5)	2018	—	—	—	—	—	—	—	—	—	—		Non-album singles
"Back to Back" (Cheat Code featuring Gunna and Young Thug)	2018	—	—	—	—	—	—	—	—	—	—		Non-album singles
"On Fye" (Shawn Scrilla featuring Gunna)	2018	—	—	—	—	—	—	—	—	—	—		Slatt Pack
"Po'ed Up" (Paris Shadows featuring Gunna)	2018	—	—	—	—	—	—	—	—	—	—		Non-album singles
"Dead Presidents" (Hoodrich Keem featuring Gunna and Lil Duke)	2018	—	—	—	—	—	—	—	—	—	—		Non-album singles
"Drip Nation" (Sosamann featuring Gunna)	2018	—	—	—	—	—	—	—	—	—	—		Non-album singles
"Us" (Dave East featuring Gunna)	2018	—	—	—	—	—	—	—	—	—	—		Karma 2
"Do You Understand?" (Shy Glizzy featuring Gunna and Tory Lanez)	2018	—	—	—	—	—	—	—	—	—	—	RIAA: Gold	Fully Loaded
"My Drippin" (Da Wrapper featuring Gunna)	2018	—	—	—	—	—	—	—	—	—	—		Non-album single
"Good Dope" (Marlo featuring Gunna)	2018	—	—	—	—	—	—	—	—	—	—		The Real 1
"Wherebouts" (Omeeezy Chappo featuring Gunna)	2018	—	—	—	—	—	—	—	—	—	—		Non-album singles
"Maximized" (Tomorrow Genius featuring Gunna)	2018	—	—	—	—	—	—	—	—	—	—		Non-album singles
"Drip Like That" (Reese LaFlare featuring Gunna)	2018	—	—	—	—	—	—	—	—	—	—		Reese LaFlare
"Afford It" (6ixers featuring Gunna)	2018	—	—	—	—	—	—	—	—	—	—		Undefeated
"Fasho" (Fetty Luciano featuring Gunna)	2018	—	—	—	—	—	—	—	—	—	—		Story to Tell
"Choosin" (Devon Tracy featuring Gunna)	2018	—	—	—	—	—	—	—	—	—	—		Non-album single
"Got Me a Check" (B Shot and DJ Fly Guy featuring Gunna)	2018	—	—	—	—	—	—	—	—	—	—		Definition of a Hustler
"New Hunnids" (Young Scooter featuring Yung Bans and Gunna)	2018	—	—	—	—	—	—	—	—	—	—		The Recipe
"Broken Homes" (The Plug featuring Nafe Smallz, M Huncho, and Gunna)	2018	—	—	—	—	—	—	—	—	38	—	BPI: Silver	Plug Talk
"Yosemite" (Travis Scott featuring Gunna and Nav)	2018	25	16	14	97	18	93	—	—	93	—	RIAA: 4× Platinum; ARIA: Gold; BPI: Gold; MC: 4× Platinum	Astroworld
"Vicious (Oakland Remix)" (San Quinn featuring Galaxy Atoms, Grumpy, Stevie Joe, B Dubb, and Gunna)	2018	—	—	—	—	—	—	—	—	—	—		Non-album single
"Space Cadet" (Metro Boomin featuring Gunna)	2019	51	22	22	—	40	—	—	—	—	—	RIAA: 2× Platinum; ARIA: 2× Platinum; BPI: Gold; MC: 5× Platinum; RMNZ: 2× Platinum	Not All Heroes Wear Capes
"No Cappin at All" (FDW Baybay, Dj Ray G, and Dj RedFx featuring Gunna)	2019	—	—	—	—	—	—	—	—	—	—		Sorry 4 the Slime
"Man 2 Be" (Rockstar Rodie featuring Gunna)	2019	—	—	—	—	—	—	—	—	—	—		Non-album singles
"Perfect Timing" (Yung Joc featuring Gunna and B. Smyth)	2019	—	—	—	—	—	—	—	—	—	—		Non-album singles
"Studio" (Kid Rootz featuring Young Thug and Gunna)	2019	—	—	—	—	—	—	—	—	—	—		Non-album singles
"Heat" (Chris Brown featuring Gunna)	2019	36	18	—	—	—	—	—	— (Note: "Heat" did not enter the NZ Top 40 Singles Chart, but peaked at number 11 on the NZ Hot Singles Chart.)	—	—	RIAA: 4× Platinum; BPI: Silver; RMNZ: Platinum	Indigo
"On Time" (Ufo361 featuring Gunna)	2019	—	—	—	—	—	—	—	—	—	—		Wave
"Bell" (Eazy Swindles featuring Gunna)	2019	—	—	—	—	—	—	—	—	—	—		Non-album single
"Suicide Doors" (French Montana featuring Gunna)	2019	—	—	—	—	—	—	—	—	—	—		Montana
"Stuck in a Dream" (Lil Mosey featuring Gunna)	2019	62	30	24	92	34	—	82	— (Note: "Stuck in a Dream" did not enter the NZ Top 40 Singles Chart, but peaked at number 27 on the NZ Hot Singles Chart.)	83	—	RIAA: Platinum; BPI: Silver; RMNZ: Gold	Certified Hitmaker
"Verify" (Jacquees featuring Young Thug and Gunna)	2019	—	—	—	—	—	—	—	—	—	—		King of R&B
"I Wanna Rock" (G-Eazy featuring Gunna)	2019	—	—	—	—	—	—	—	—	—	—		Scary Nights
"First Class" (Blueface featuring Gunna)	2019	— (Note: "First Class" did not enter the Billboard Hot 100, but peaked at number 18 on the Bubbling Under Hot 100 chart.)	—	—	—	—	—	—	— (Note: "First Class" did not enter the NZ Top 40 Singles Chart, but peaked at number 39 on the NZ Hot Singles Chart.)	—	—		Find the Beat
"Start wit Me" (Roddy Ricch featuring Gunna)	2019	56	25	18	—	63	—	—	— (Note: "Start wit Me" did not enter the NZ Top 40 Singles Chart, but peaked at number 37 on the NZ Hot Singles Chart.)	—	—	RIAA: 2× Platinum; MC: Platinum; RMNZ: Gold	Please Excuse Me for Being Antisocial
"Hot" (Young Thug featuring Gunna or remix also featuring Travis Scott)	2019	11	5	3	49	18	119	44	9	52	—	RIAA: Platinum; ARIA: Gold; BPI: Gold; MC: Gold; RMNZ: Platinum	So Much Fun
"Picasso" (Leeky Bandz featuring Gunna)	2019	—	—	—	—	—	—	—	—	—	—		Non-album singles
"W" (Koffee featuring Gunna)	2019	—	—	—	—	—	—	—	—	82	—	BPI: Silver	Non-album singles
"Dead Wrong" (LOR. 3leven featuring Gunna)	2019	—	—	—	—	—	—	—	—	—	—		Non-album singles
"Let You Go" (Benjamin Kickz featuring Gunna)	2020	—	—	—	—	—	—	—	—	—	—		Non-album singles
"Numbers" (A Boogie wit da Hoodie featuring Roddy Ricch, Gunna, and London on da Track)	2020	23	12	7	—	32	—	—	— (Note: "Numbers" did not enter the NZ Top 40 Singles Chart, but peaked at number 37 on the NZ Hot Singles Chart.)	53	—	RIAA: Platinum; MC: Platinum	Artist 2.0
"Gotta Be Careful" (Dolly White featuring Gunna)	2020	—	—	—	—	—	—	—	—	—	—		Non-album singles
"My Oh My (Remix)" (Camila Cabello featuring DaBaby and Gunna)	2020	—	—	—	—	—	—	—	—	—	—		Non-album singles
"Hollywood Love" (A. Chal featuring Gunna)	2020	—	—	—	—	—	—	—	—	—	—		Non-album singles
"Gucci Gucci" (Lil Durk featuring Gunna)	2020	—	—	—	—	—	—	—	—	—	—		Just Cause Y'all Waited 2
"Fox 5" (Lil Keed featuring Gunna)	2020	—	—	—	—	—	—	—	—	—	—		Trapped on Cleveland 3
"Cafeteria" (Chase B and Don Toliver featuring Gunna)	2020	—	—	—	—	—	—	—	—	—	—		Escapism
"Jimmy Choo" (Karlae featuring Young Thug and Gunna)	2020	—	—	—	—	—	—	—	—	—	—		Non-album single
"Praise" (Tchami featuring Gunna)	2020	—	—	—	—	—	—	—	—	—	—		Year Zero
"On Fleek" (Yella Beezy featuring Gunna)	2020	—	—	—	—	—	—	—	—	—	—		Non-album singles
"Flawed" (Wale featuring Gunna)	2020	—	—	—	—	—	—	—	—	—	—		Non-album singles
"Caution" (Trey Trey featuring DJ Pharris and Gunna)	2020	—	—	—	—	—	—	—	—	—	—		Non-album singles
"Sticky" (Felipe Da Don featuring Lil Baby and Gunna)	2020	—	—	—	—	—	—	—	—	—	—		Non-album singles
"All the Smoke" (Tyla Yaweh featuring Gunna and Wiz Khalifa)	2020	—	—	—	—	—	—	—	— (Note: "All the Smoke" did not enter the NZ Top 40 Singles Chart, but peaked at number 38 on the NZ Hot Singles Chart.)	—	—		Non-album singles
"Get It" (Charlie Sloth featuring Gunna, Abra Cadabra, and Kelvyn Colt)	2021	—	—	—	—	—	—	—	—	—	—		Non-album singles
"Big" (Rita Ora, David Guetta, and Imanbek featuring Gunna)	2021	—	—	—	—	—	—	53	— (Note: "Big" did not enter the NZ Top 40 Singles Chart, but peaked at number 16 on the NZ Hot Singles Chart.)	53	—		Bang
"Murder Me" (Shad da God featuring Gunna)	2021	—	—	—	—	—	—	—	—	—	—		Non-album singles
"His & Hers" (Internet Money, Don Toliver, and Lil Uzi Vert featuring Gunna)	2021	67	34	—	—	53	—	—	— (Note: "His & Hers" did not enter the NZ Top 40 Singles Chart, but peaked at number 9 on the NZ Hot Singles Chart.)	—	74	RIAA: Gold; RMNZ: Gold	Non-album singles
"Work Out" (Lil Gotit featuring Gunna)	2021	—	—	—	—	—	—	—	—	—	—		Top Chef Gotit
"Waves" (Culture Jam featuring Gunna and Polo G)	2021	—	—	—	—	—	—	—	—	—	—		Culture Jam
"London" (Booka600 featuring Gunna)	2021	—	—	—	—	—	—	—	—	—	—		Loyal
"Elon Musk" (DDG featuring Gunna)	2022	— (Note: "Elon Musk" did not enter the Billboard Hot 100, but peaked at number 12 on the Bubbling Under Hot 100 chart.)	48	—	—	—	—	—	—	—	—		Non-album singles
"Lights Off" (Tay Keith featuring Gunna and Lil Durk)	2022	—	—	—	—	—	—	—	—	—	—		Non-album singles
"Day Off" (James Tonic featuring Gunna)	—	—	—	—	—	—	—	—	—	—			Non-album singles
"1:59" (Normani featuring Gunna)	2024	—	—	—	—	—	—	—	— (Note: "1:59" did not enter the NZ Top 40 Singles Chart, but peaked at number 15 on the NZ Hot Singles Chart.)	—	—		Dopamine
"Receipts" (Diplo and Mau P featuring Gunna)	2024	—	—	—	—	—	—	—	—	—	—		Non-album singles
"Champs Elysées" (Toosii featuring Gunna)	2024	—	—	—	—	—	—	—	—	—	—		Jaded
"No Heart" (Lil Pak featuring Gunna)	2025	—	—	—	—	—	—	—	—	—	—		Non-album single
"Him" (Shallipopi featuring Gunna)	2025	—	—	—	—	—	—	—	—	—	—		Auracle
"—" denotes a recording that did not chart or was not released in that territory.

== Other charted and certified songs ==
List of songs, with selected chart positions, showing year charted and album name
Title	Year	Peak chart positions										Certifications	Album
Title	Year	US	US R&B/HH	US Rap	AUS	CAN	FRA	IRE	NZ Hot	UK	WW	Certifications	Album
"Floyd Mayweather" (Young Thug featuring Travis Scott, Gucci Mane and Gunna)	2016	— (Note: "Floyd Mayweather" did not enter the Billboard Hot 100, but peaked at number 4 on the Bubbling Under Hot 100 chart.)	41	—	—	—	—	—	—	—	—		Jeffery
"Marvelous Day" (Kap G featuring Gunna and Lil Uzi Vert)	2017	—	— (Note: "Marvelous Day" did not enter the Billboard Hot R&B/Hip-Hop Songs chart, but peaked at number 10 on the Bubbling Under R&B/Hip-Hop Singles chart.)	—	—	—	—	—	—	—	—	RIAA: Gold	Mood and Real Migo Shit 4
"Drip Or Drown"	2017	—	—	—	—	—	—	—	—	—	—	RMNZ: Gold	Drip Or Drown
"Home Body" (Lil Durk featuring Gunna and TK Kravitz)	2018	—	—	—	—	—	—	—	—	—	—	RIAA: Platinum	Just Cause Y'all Waited and Signed to the Streets 3
"Life Goes On" (Lil Baby featuring Gunna and Lil Uzi Vert)	2018	74	36	—	—	—	—	—	—	—	—	RIAA: 2× Platinum; MC: Platinum; RMNZ: Platinum; BPI: Silver	Harder Than Ever
"Chanel (Go Get It)" (Young Thug featuring Gunna and Lil Baby)	2018	78	31	25	—	92	—	—	—	—	—	RIAA: Platinum; BPI: Silver; MC: Platinum; RMNZ: Gold	Slime Language
"Off White Vlone" (with Lil Baby featuring Lil Durk and Nav)	2018	54	25	23	—	52	—	—	36	—	—	RIAA: Gold; MC: Gold	Drip Harder
"Business Is Business" (with Lil Baby)	2018	61	28	—	—	69	—	—	—	—	—	RIAA: Gold	Drip Harder
"Belly" (with Lil Baby)	2018	80	37	—	—	92	—	—	—	—	—		Drip Harder
"World Is Yours"	2018	— (Note: "World Is Yours" did not enter the Billboard Hot 100, but peaked at number 1 on the Bubbling Under Hot 100 chart.)	48	—	—	—	—	—	—	—	—		Drip Harder
"Underdog" (with Lil Baby)	2018	— (Note: "Underdog" did not enter the Billboard Hot 100, but peaked at number 2 on the Bubbling Under Hot 100 chart.)	— (Note: "Underdog" did not enter the Billboard Hot R&B/Hip-Hop Songs chart, but peaked at number 1 on the Bubbling Under R&B/Hip-Hop Singles chart.)	—	—	—	—	—	—	—	—		Drip Harder
"I Am" (with Lil Baby)	2018	98	46	—	—	—	—	—	—	—	—	RIAA: Gold	Drip Harder
"Seals Pills" (with Lil Baby)	2018	— (Note: "Seals Pills" did not enter the Billboard Hot 100, but peaked at number 13 on the Bubbling Under Hot 100 chart.)	— (Note: "Seals Pills" did not enter the Billboard Hot R&B/Hip-Hop Songs chart, but peaked at number 5 on the Bubbling Under R&B/Hip-Hop Singles chart.)	—	—	—	—	—	—	—	—		Drip Harder
"My Jeans" (with Lil Baby featuring Young Thug)	2018	— (Note: "My Jeans" did not enter the Billboard Hot 100, but peaked at number 4 on the Bubbling Under Hot 100 chart.)	— (Note: "My Jeans" did not enter the Billboard Hot R&B/Hip-Hop Songs chart, but peaked at number 2 on the Bubbling Under R&B/Hip-Hop Singles chart.)	—	—	—	—	—	—	—	—		Drip Harder
"Style Stealer"	2018	— (Note: "Style Stealer" did not enter the Billboard Hot 100, but peaked at number 11 on the Bubbling Under Hot 100 chart.)	— (Note: "Style Stealer" did not enter the Billboard Hot R&B/Hip-Hop Songs chart, but peaked at number 4 on the Bubbling Under R&B/Hip-Hop Singles chart.)	—	—	—	—	—	—	—	—		Drip Harder
"Never Recover" (with Lil Baby and Drake)	2018	15	9	9	—	16	—	89	13	46	—	RIAA: 2× Platinum; BPI: Silver; MC: Platinum; RMNZ: Gold	Drip Harder
"Miami" (Tory Lanez featuring Gunna)	2018	— (Note: "Miami" did not enter the Billboard Hot 100, but peaked at number 14 on the Bubbling Under Hot 100 chart.)	— (Note: "Miami" did not enter the Billboard Hot R&B/Hip-Hop Songs chart, but peaked at number 2 on the Bubbling Under R&B/Hip-Hop Singles chart.)	—	—	89	—	—	—	—	—		Love Me Now?
"Lesbian" (Metro Boomin featuring Gunna and Young Thug)	2018	— (Note: "Lesbian" did not enter the Billboard Hot 100, but peaked at number 4 on the Bubbling Under Hot 100 chart.)	— (Note: "Lesbian" did not enter the Billboard Hot R&B/Hip-Hop Songs chart, but peaked at number 2 on the Bubbling Under R&B/Hip-Hop Singles chart.)	—	—	—	—	—	—	—	—	MC: Gold	Not All Heroes Wear Capes
"Feefa" (6ix9ine featuring Gunna)	2018	— (Note: "Feefa" did not enter the Billboard Hot 100, but peaked at number 10 on the Bubbling Under Hot 100 chart.)	— (Note: "Feefa" did not enter the Billboard Hot R&B/Hip-Hop Songs chart, but peaked at number 2 on the Bubbling Under R&B/Hip-Hop Singles chart.)	—	—	100	—	—	—	—	—		Dummy Boy
"Ready" (Lil Baby featuring Gunna)	2018	66	35	—	—	—	—	—	—	—	—	RIAA: Platinum; BPI: Silver; RMNZ: Gold	Street Gossip
"Can't Leave Without It" (21 Savage featuring Gunna and Lil Baby)	2018	58	18	16	—	70	—	—	12	—	—	RIAA: 3× Platinum; MC: 2× Platinum; BPI: Silver; RMNZ: Gold	I Am > I Was
"Unicorn Purp" (Future featuring Young Thug and Gunna)	2019	— (Note: "Unicorn Purp" did not enter the Billboard Hot 100, but peaked at number 4 on the Bubbling Under Hot 100 chart.)	— (Note: "Unicorn Purp" did not enter the Billboard Hot R&B/Hip-Hop Songs chart, but peaked at number 2 on the Bubbling Under R&B/Hip-Hop Singles chart.)	—	—	—	—	—	—	—	—		The Wizrd
"Wit It"	2019	75	36	—	—	—	—	—	—	—	—		Drip or Drown 2
"Outstanding"	2019	70	32	—	—	—	—	—	38	—	—	RIAA: Gold	Drip or Drown 2
"Cash War"	2019	— (Note: "Cash War" did not enter the Billboard Hot 100, but peaked at number 10 on the Bubbling Under Hot 100 chart.)	—	—	—	—	—	—	—	—	—		Drip or Drown 2
"Richard Millie Plain"	2019	— (Note: "Richard Millie Plain" did not enter the Billboard Hot 100, but peaked at number 3 on the Bubbling Under Hot 100 chart.)	50	—	—	—	—	—	—	—	—	RIAA: Gold	Drip or Drown 2
"Yao Ming"	2019	— (Note: "Yao Ming" did not enter the Billboard Hot 100, but peaked at number 15 on the Bubbling Under Hot 100 chart.)	—	—	—	—	—	—	—	—	—		Drip or Drown 2
"Idk Why"	2019	— (Note: "Idk Why" did not enter the Billboard Hot 100, but peaked at number 19 on the Bubbling Under Hot 100 chart.)	—	—	—	—	—	—	—	—	—		Drip or Drown 2
"Derek Fisher" (featuring Lil Baby)	2019	— (Note: "Derek Fisher" did not enter the Billboard Hot 100, but peaked at number 5 on the Bubbling Under Hot 100 chart.)	—	—	—	—	—	—	—	—	—		Drip or Drown 2
"Baby Birkin"	2019	— (Note: "Baby Birkin" did not enter the Billboard Hot 100, but peaked at number 7 on the Bubbling Under Hot 100 chart.)	— (Note: "Baby Birkin" did not enter the Billboard Hot R&B/Hip-Hop Songs chart, but peaked at number 2 on the Bubbling Under R&B/Hip-Hop Singles chart.)	—	—	—	—	—	—	—	—	RIAA: Platinum	Drip or Drown 2
"3 Headed Snake" (featuring Young Thug)	2019	74	35	—	—	—	—	—	40	—	—	RIAA: Gold	Drip or Drown 2
"Same Yung Nigga" (featuring Playboi Carti)	2019	97	45	—	—	—	—	—	23	—	—	RIAA: Gold	Drip or Drown 2
"Who You Foolin"	2019	—	—	—	—	—	—	—	—	—	—	RIAA: Gold; RMNZ: Platinum	Drip or Drown 2
"Wild Wild West" (Offset featuring Gunna)	2019	— (Note: "Wild Wild West" did not enter the Billboard Hot 100, but peaked at number 4 on the Bubbling Under Hot 100 chart.)	—	—	—	—	—	—	—	—	—		Father of 4
"Hold Your Breath" (Nav featuring Gunna)	2019	—	—	—	—	85	—	—	—	—	—		Bad Habits
"Fall Threw" (Rich the Kid featuring Young Thug and Gunna)	2019	— (Note: "Fall Threw" did not enter the Billboard Hot 100, but peaked at number 16 on the Bubbling Under Hot 100 chart.)	— (Note: "Fall Threw" did not enter the Billboard Hot R&B/Hip-Hop Songs chart, but peaked at number 4 on the Bubbling Under R&B/Hip-Hop Singles chart.)	—	—	—	—	—	—	—	—		The World Is Yours 2
"Freak n You" (DJ Khaled featuring Lil Wayne and Gunna)	2019	— (Note: "Wild Wild West" did not enter the Billboard Hot 100, but peaked at number 3 on the Bubbling Under Hot 100 chart.)	49	—	—	—	—	—	—	—	—		Father of Asahd
"Dior" (Moneybagg Yo featuring Gunna)	2019	— (Note: "Dior" did not enter the Billboard Hot 100, but peaked at number 10 on the Bubbling Under Hot 100 chart.)	— (Note: "Dior" did not enter the Billboard Hot R&B/Hip-Hop Songs chart, but peaked at number 3 on the Bubbling Under R&B/Hip-Hop Singles chart.)	—	—	—	—	—	—	—	—	RIAA: Gold	43va Heartless
"Pink Toes" (Quality Control, Offset, and DaBaby featuring Gunna)	2019	—	— (Note: "Pink Toes" did not enter the Hot R&B/Hip-Hop Songs chart, but peaked at number 7 on the Bubbling Under R&B/Hip-Hop Singles chart.)	—	—	—	—	—	—	—	—		Control the Streets, Volume 2
"Surf" (Young Thug featuring Gunna)	2019	61	24	22	—	—	—	—	—	—	—	RIAA: Gold	So Much Fun
"Diamonds" (Young Thug featuring Gunna)	2019	— (Note: "Diamonds" did not enter the Billboard Hot 100, but peaked at number 9 on the Bubbling Under Hot 100 chart.)	—	—	—	—	—	—	28	—	—		So Much Fun (Deluxe)
"Heatin Up" (with Lil Baby)	2020	18	10	6	—	36	—	88	8	66	—	RIAA: Platinum	My Turn
"Strawberry Peels" (Lil Uzi Vert featuring Young Thug and Gunna)	2020	60	34	—	—	—	—	—	—	—	—		Lil Uzi Vert vs. the World 2
"Codeine" (Nav featuring Gunna)	2020	— (Note: "Codeine" did not enter the Billboard Hot 100, but peaked at number 12 on the Bubbling Under Hot 100 chart.)	—	—	—	80	—	—	—	30	—		Good Intentions
"Argentina"	2020	67	31	—	—	97	—	—	—	22	—		Wunna
"Gimmick"	2020	86	41	—	—	—	—	—	—	—	—		Wunna
"MOTW"	2020	84	39	—	—	—	—	—	—	—	—		Wunna
"Feigning"	2020	98	50	—	—	—	—	—	—	—	—		Wunna
"Addys" (featuring Nechie)	2020	— (Note: "Addys" did not enter the Billboard Hot 100, but peaked at number 1 on the Bubbling Under Hot 100 chart.)	—	—	—	—	—	—	—	—	—		Wunna
"Blindfold" (featuring Lil Baby)	2020	59	26	23	—	86	—	—	—	—	—	RIAA: Gold; MC: Gold	Wunna
"Rockstar Bikers & Chains"	2020	— (Note: "Rockstar Bikers & Chains" did not enter the Billboard Hot 100, but peaked at number 3 on the Bubbling Under Hot 100 chart.)	—	—	—	—	—	—	—	—	—		Wunna
"Met Gala"	2020	70	32	—	—	—	—	—	—	—	—	RIAA: Platinum; MC: Gold	Wunna
"Nasty Girl/On Camera"	2020	78	37	—	—	—	—	—	—	—	—	MC: Gold	Wunna
"Cooler than a Bitch" (featuring Roddy Ricch)	2020	41	16	14	—	51	—	—	—	11	—	RIAA: Platinum; MC: Platinum	Wunna
"I'm on Some"	2020	— (Note: "I'm on Some" did not enter the Billboard Hot 100, but peaked at number 15 on the Bubbling Under Hot 100 chart.)	—	—	—	—	—	—	—	—	—		Wunna
"Top Floor" (featuring Travis Scott)	2020	55	22	19	185	73	—	—	4	90	—	MC: Gold	Wunna
"Don't Play Around"	2020	— (Note: "Don't Play Around" did not enter the Billboard Hot 100, but peaked at number 23 on the Bubbling Under Hot 100 chart.)	—	—	—	—	—	—	—	—	—		Wunna
"Do Better"	2020	— (Note: "Do Better" did not enter the Billboard Hot 100, but peaked at number 12 on the Bubbling Under Hot 100 chart.)	—	—	—	—	—	—	—	—	—		Wunna
"Far" (featuring Young Thug)	2020	— (Note: "Far" did not enter the Billboard Hot 100, but peaked at number 20 on the Bubbling Under Hot 100 chart.)	—	—	—	—	—	—	—	—	—		Wunna
"200 for Lunch"	2020	— (Note: "200 for Lunch" did not enter the Billboard Hot 100, but peaked at number 16 on the Bubbling Under Hot 100 chart.)	—	—	—	—	—	—	—	—	—		Wunna
"Street Sweeper" (featuring Future)	2020	— (Note: "Street Sweeper" did not enter the Billboard Hot 100, but peaked at number 1 on the Bubbling Under Hot 100 chart.)	43	—	—	—	—	—	—	—	—		Wunna
"One Watch" (featuring Young Thug)	2020	— (Note: "One Watch" did not enter the Billboard Hot 100, but peaked at number 21 on the Bubbling Under Hot 100 chart.)	—	—	—	—	—	—	—	—	—		Wunna
"Relentless" (featuring Lil Uzi Vert)	2020	— (Note: "Relentless" did not enter the Billboard Hot 100, but peaked at number 2 on the Bubbling Under Hot 100 chart.)	44	—	—	—	—	—	26	—	—		Wunna
"Slatty" (with YSL Records and Young Thug featuring Yak Gotti and Lil Duke)	2021	99	39	—	—	—	—	—	—	—	154		Slime Language 2
"Ski" (with YSL Records and Young Thug)	2021	18	11	9	—	33	—	97	6	72	23	RIAA: Gold	Slime Language 2
"Diamonds Dancing" (with YSL Records and Young Thug featuring Travis Scott)	2021	46	21	16	—	39	—	97	35	80	35		Slime Language 2
"Solid" (with YSL Records and Young Thug featuring Drake)	2021	12	6	4	—	8	—	42	1	36	11	RIAA: Gold; BPI: Silver; RMNZ: Gold	Slime Language 2
"Paid the Fine" (with YSL Records and Young Thug featuring Lil Baby and YTB Trench)	2021	77	32	—	—	93	—	—	—	—	104		Slime Language 2
"Emergency" (21 Savage featuring Gunna and Young Thug)	2021	— (Note: "Emergency" did not enter the Billboard Hot 100, but peaked at number 17 on the Bubbling Under Hot 100 chart.)	—	—	—	—	—	—	—	—	—		Spiral: From the Book of Saw Soundtrack
"Recognize Real" (with Young Thug)	2021	— (Note: "Recognize Real" did not enter the Billboard Hot 100, but peaked at number 3 on the Bubbling Under Hot 100 chart.)	—	—	—	—	—	—	—	—	—		Punk
"Insure My Wrist" (with Young Thug)	2021	— (Note: "Insure My Wrist" did not enter the Billboard Hot 100, but peaked at number 22 on the Bubbling Under Hot 100 chart.)	—	—	—	—	—	—	—	—	—		Punk
"Love You More" (with Young Thug, Nate Ruess, and Jeff Bhasker)	2021	— (Note: "Love You More" did not enter the Billboard Hot 100, but peaked at number 23 on the Bubbling Under Hot 100 chart.)	—	—	—	—	—	—	—	—	—		Punk
"Don't I" (Roddy Ricch featuring Gunna)	2021	— (Note: "Don't I" did not enter the Billboard Hot 100, but peaked at number 11 on the Bubbling Under Hot 100 chart.)	—	—	—	—	—	—	—	—	—		Live Life Fast
"Private Island"	2022	68	26	17	—	83	—	—	—	—	84		DS4Ever
"Pushin P" (with Future featuring Young Thug)	2022	7	2	2	19	10	—	27	9	28	20	RIAA: 2× Platinum; BPI: Silver; RMNZ: Platinum; MC: 3× Platinum	DS4Ever
"Poochie Gown"	2022	42	13	7	—	63	—	—	—	—	52		DS4Ever
"Mop" (featuring Young Thug)	2022	45	15	9	—	64	—	—	—	—	56		DS4Ever
"Thought I Was Playing" (with 21 Savage)	2022	23	7	5	—	51	—	—	10	—	38		DS4Ever
"P Power" (featuring Drake)	2022	24	7	—	—	22	—	—	5	76	30	RIAA: 3× Platinum; BPI: Silver; RMNZ: Platinum; MC: 3× Platinum	DS4Ever
"How You Did That" (featuring Kodak Black)	2022	47	17	11	—	69	—	—	—	13	51	RIAA: Gold	DS4Ever
"Alotta Cake"	2022	46	16	10	—	62	—	—	—	—	57		DS4Ever
"Livin Wild"	2022	61	24	16	—	81	—	—	—	—	82		DS4Ever
"You & Me" (with Chlöe)	2022	72	29	20	—	99	—	—	—	—	97		DS4Ever
"South to West"	2022	70	28	19	—	82	—	—	—	—	94	RIAA: Gold	DS4Ever
"25K Jacket" (featuring Lil Baby)	2022	28	9	6	—	56	—	—	14	47	42	RIAA: Platinum	DS4Ever
"IDK That Bitch" (featuring G Herbo)	2022	59	22	15	—	79	—	—	—	—	86		DS4Ever
"Flooded"	2022	86	35	22	—	100	—	—	—	—	125		DS4Ever
"Life of Sin" (featuring Nechie)	2022	— (Note: "Life of Sin" did not enter the Billboard Hot 100, but peaked at number 3 on the Bubbling Under Hot 100 chart.)	42	—	—	—	—	—	—	—	—		DS4Ever
"Die Alone" (with Chris Brown featuring Yung Bleu)	2022	92	38	25	—	—	—	—	—	—	143		DS4Ever
"Missing Me"	2022	— (Note: "Missing Me" did not enter the Billboard Hot 100, but peaked at number 2 on the Bubbling Under Hot 100 chart.)	41	—	—	—	—	—	—	—	—		DS4Ever
"So Far Ahead > Empire"	2022	— (Note: "So Far Ahead > Empire" did not enter the Billboard Hot 100, but peaked at number 1 on the Bubbling Under Hot 100 chart.)	40	—	—	—	—	—	—	—	195		DS4Ever
"Today" (Cordae featuring Gunna)	2022	— (Note: "Today" did not enter the Billboard Hot 100, but peaked at number 11 on the Bubbling Under Hot 100 chart.)	—	—	—	—	—	—	28	—	—		From a Birds Eye View
"Rackz Got Me" (Yeat featuring Gunna)	2022	— (Note: "Rackz Got Me" did not enter the Billboard Hot 100, but peaked at number 7 on the Bubbling Under Hot 100 chart.)	44	—	—	—	—	—	38	—	—		2 Alive
"What Happened to Virgil" (Lil Durk featuring Gunna)	2022	22	6	5	—	65	—	—	36	70	35	RIAA: Gold	7220
"Die in California" (Machine Gun Kelly featuring Gunna, Young Thug, and Landon Barker)	2022	— (Note: "Die in California" did not enter the Billboard Hot 100, but peaked at number 15 on the Bubbling Under Hot 100 chart.)	—	—	—	95	—	—	38	—	—		Mainstream Sellout
"For a Nut" (Future featuring Gunna and Young Thug)	2022	24	14	12	—	52	—	—	—	—	14		I Never Liked You
"Certified" (Pooh Shiesty featuring Gunna)	2022	— (Note: "Certified" did not enter the Billboard Hot 100, but peaked at number 10 on the Bubbling Under Hot 100 chart.)	49	—	—	—	—	—	40	—	—		Shiesty Season: Certified
"I Cannot Be (A Sadder Song)" (Post Malone featuring Gunna)	2022	46	8	8	—	34	—	—	—	—	47		Twelve Carat Toothache
"Fam Good, We Good" (DJ Khaled featuring Gunna and Roddy Ricch)	2022	— (Note: "Fam Good, We Good" did not enter the Billboard Hot 100, but peaked at number 9 on the Bubbling Under Hot 100 chart.)	39	—	—	—	—	—	—	—	—		God Did
"Playa" (with Nav)	2022	— (Note: "Playa" did not enter the Billboard Hot 100, but peaked at number 23 on the Bubbling Under Hot 100 chart.)	49	—	—	—	—	—	—	—	—		Demons Protected by Angels
"Chocolate" (with Quavo, Takeoff, and Young Thug)	2022	—	48	—	—	—	—	—	—	—	—		Only Built for Infinity Links
"All the Money" (with Metro Boomin)	2022	66	25	18	—	57	—	—	—	—	97		Heroes & Villains
"Back at It"	2023	51	17	12	—	85	—	—	—	—	158		A Gift & a Curse
"Back to the Moon"	2023	29	10	5	—	56	—	—	5	72	69	RIAA: Gold; MC: Gold	A Gift & a Curse
"IDK NoMore"	2023	76	29	22	—	—	—	—	—	—	—		A Gift & a Curse
"Paybach"	2023	83	34	23	—	—	—	—	—	—	—		A Gift & a Curse
"Ca$h $hit"	2023	60	23	17	—	92	—	—	13	—	—		A Gift & a Curse
"Rodeo Dr"	2023	42	15	10	—	68	—	—	15	—	125	RIAA: Gold	A Gift & a Curse
"Bottom"	2023	62	25	19	—	—	—	—	—	—	—		A Gift & a Curse
"P Angels"	2023	77	30	—	—	—	—	—	—	—	—		A Gift & a Curse
"Born Rich"	2023	— (Note: "Born Rich" did not enter the Billboard Hot 100, but peaked at number 1 on the Bubbling Under Hot 100 chart.)	44	—	—	—	—	—	—	—	—		A Gift & a Curse
"Go Crazy"	2023	94	37	—	—	—	—	—	—	—	—		A Gift & a Curse
"Turned Your Back"	2023	— (Note: "Turned Your Back" did not enter the Billboard Hot 100, but peaked at number 3 on the Bubbling Under Hot 100 chart.)	46	—	—	—	—	—	—	—	—		A Gift & a Curse
"I Was Just Thinking"	2023	— (Note: "I Was Just Thinking" did not enter the Billboard Hot 100, but peaked at number 11 on the Bubbling Under Hot 100 chart.)	49	—	—	—	—	—	—	—	—		A Gift & a Curse
"Alright"	2023	— (Note: "Alright" did not enter the Billboard Hot 100, but peaked at number 18 on the Bubbling Under Hot 100 chart.)	—	—	—	—	—	—	—	—	—		A Gift & a Curse
"Collage"	2024	76	29	25	—	—	—	—	21	—	—		One of Wun
"Neck on a Yacht"	2024	66	26	22	—	—	—	—	—	—	—		One of Wun
"Hakuna Matata"	2024	67	27	23	—	98	—	—	18	96	179	BPI: Silver; RMNZ: Gold	One of Wun
"Treesh"	2024	— (Note: "Treesh" did not enter the Billboard Hot 100, but peaked at number 2 on the Bubbling Under Hot 100 chart.)	35	—	—	—	—	—	—	—	—		One of Wun
"On One Tonight"	2024	54	21	18	—	67	—	98	16	52	120	ARIA: Platinum; BPI: Gold; MC: Platinum; RMNZ: Platinum	One of Wun
"Back in the A"	2024	94	33	—	—	—	—	—	—	—	—		One of Wun
"Trio"	2024	— (Note: "Trio" did not enter the Billboard Hot 100, but peaked at number 7 on the Bubbling Under Hot 100 chart.)	39	—	—	—	—	—	—	—	—		One of Wun
"Still Prevail"	2024	— (Note: "Still Prevail" did not enter the Billboard Hot 100, but peaked at number 4 on the Bubbling Under Hot 100 chart.)	37	—	—	—	—	—	—	—	—		One of Wun
"Blackjack"	2024	— (Note: "Blackjack" did not enter the Billboard Hot 100, but peaked at number 17 on the Bubbling Under Hot 100 chart.)	43	—	—	—	—	—	—	—	—		One of Wun
"Let It Breathe" (featuring Roddy Ricch)	2024	—	49	—	—	—	—	—	—	—	—		One of Wun
"It Is What It Is" (with Big Sean)	2024	—	38	—	—	—	—	—	—	—	—		Better Me Than You
"Way It Is" (with Justin Bieber)	2025	33	7	—	43	33	—	—	34	—	27		Swag
"Many Nights"	2025	99	27	18	—	—	—	—	—	—	—		The Last Wun
"Let That Sink In"	2025	80	21	12	—	—	—	—	—	—	—		The Last Wun
"Just Say Dat"	2025	46	10	5	—	85	—	—	15	86	134		The Last Wun
"GP"	2025	87	22	13	—	—	—	—	—	—	—		The Last Wun
"Sakpase"	2025	70	17	10	—	—	—	—	23	—	—		The Last Wun
"At My Purest" (featuring Offset)	2025	72	18	11	—	—	—	—	20	—	—		The Last Wun
"Biting My Game"	2025	— (Note: "Biting My Game" did not enter the Billboard Hot 100, but peaked at number 2 on the Bubbling Under Hot 100 chart.)	30	20	—	—	—	—	—	—	—		The Last Wun
"Prototype"	2025	— (Note: "Prototype" did not enter the Billboard Hot 100, but peaked at number 10 on the Bubbling Under Hot 100 chart.)	35	25	—	—	—	—	—	—	—		The Last Wun
"Forever Be Mine" (featuring Wizkid)	2025	68	16	9	—	—	—	—	—	46	111		The Last Wun
"Again"	2025	— (Note: "Again" did not enter the Billboard Hot 100, but peaked at number 3 on the Bubbling Under Hot 100 chart.)	32	23	—	—	—	—	—	—	—		The Last Wun
"Endless"	2025	— (Note: "Endless" did not enter the Billboard Hot 100, but peaked at number 12 on the Bubbling Under Hot 100 chart.)	36	—	—	—	—	—	—	—	—		The Last Wun
"I Can't Feel My Face" (featuring Nechie)	2025	— (Note: "I Can't Feel My Face" did not enter the Billboard Hot 100, but peaked at number 24 on the Bubbling Under Hot 100 chart.)	38	—	—	—	—	—	—	—	—		The Last Wun
"Podcast"	2025	—	45	—	—	—	—	—	—	—	—		The Last Wun
"Satisfaction" (featuring Asake)	2025	—	50	—	—	—	—	—	—	—	—		The Last Wun
"Different Species" (with Offset)	2025	73	13	7	—	90	—	—	—	—	183		Kiari
"—" denotes a recording that did not chart or was not released in that territory.

== Guest appearances ==
List of non-single guest appearances, with other performing artists, showing year released and album name
Title	Year	Other artist(s)	Album
"Floyd Mayweather"	2016	Young Thug, Travis Scott, Gucci Mane	Jeffery
"Whole Lotta"	2016	Lil Duke	Uber
"Fuck Nigga"	2016	Hoodrich Pablo Juan, Nechie, Lil Duke, Lil Chi Chi	—N/a
"In It to Win It"	2016	XVL Hendrix	Blessings & a Curse
"Up"	2017	Lil Baby, Lil Duke	Perfect Timing
"Our Year"	2017	Lil Baby	Perfect Timing
"Light My Blunt"	2017	Lil Duke	Life in the Hills
"Starve"	2017	Lil Duke	Life in the Hills
"Tomorrow 'Til Infinity"	2017	Young Thug	Beautiful Thugger Girls
"Bag"	2017	Jose Guapo, Lil Duke	—N/a
"Chanel Swagg"	2017	Hoodrich Pablo Juan, Shad da God, Lil Duke	Designer Drugz 3
"Traded Sleep For Success"	2017	Blacc Zacc	High Class Trapper
"If I Wanted To"	2017	Lil Duke	Uberman 2
"Money Forever"	2017	Lil Baby	Too Hard
"All This"	2017	Yung Mal and Lil Quill	Came From Zero
"Paid In Full"	2018	Hoodrich Pablo Juan, Drugrixh Hect	Rich Hood
"Last of the Real"	2018	Jose Guapo	Lingo II: The Return
"Dead Presidents"	2018	Hoodrich Keem, Lil Duke	Bodeine Withdrawals 7
"No Time"	2018	Playboi Carti	Die Lit
"Eat"	2018	Nav	Reckless
"Throwing Shade"	2018	Lil Baby	Harder Than Ever
"Life Goes On"	2018	Lil Baby, Lil Uzi Vert	Harder Than Ever
"Easter Pink"	2018	Yung Bans	Yung Bans
"Money Train"	2018	Future, Young Thug	Superfly
"Just Vibe"	2018	Hoodrich Pablo Juan	Hoodwolf 2
"Wat U On"	2018	Moneybagg Yo	Bet On Me
"Us"	2018	Dave East	Karma 2
"Zoom"	2018	Travis Scott	—N/a
"Hiccup"	2018	Aminé	OnePointFive
"Safe House"	2018	Lil Yachty	Birthday Mix 3
"Midnight"	2018	Mike Will Made-It, Tessa Thompson	Creed II
"Chanel (Go Get It)"	2018	Young Thug, Lil Baby	Slime Language
"Dirty Shoes"	2018	Young Thug	Slime Language
"Scoliosis"	2018	Young Thug, Lil Duke	Slime Language
"Chains Choking Me"	2018	Young Thug	Slime Language
"Gift Shop"	2018	Usher, Zaytoven	A
"Ain't Livin Right"	2018	Future, Juice Wrld	Wrld on Drugs
"Fallin' in Luv"	2018	Lil Yachty	Nuthin' 2 Prove
"Miami"	2018	Tory Lanez	Love Me Now?
"Lesbian"	2018	Metro Boomin, Young Thug	Not All Heroes Wear Capes
"Don't Talk To Me"	2018	Lil Durk	Signed to the Streets 3
"Superstar"	2018	Lil Gotit	Hood Baby
"Racks"	2018	88Glam	88Glam 2
"Stay Long Love You"	2018	Mariah Carey	Caution
"Feefa"	2018	6ix9ine	Dummy Boy
"Can't Leave Without It"	2018	21 Savage, Lil Baby	I Am Greater Than I Was
"Unicorn Purp"	2019	Future, Young Thug	The Wizrd
"Trained to Kill"	2019	G Herbo, Southside	Still Swervin
"Wild Wild West"	2019	Offset	Father of 4
"Stop The Madness"	2019	Lil Skies	Shelby
"Hood Gunna"	2019	Lil Gotit	Crazy But It's True
"Hold Your Breath"	2019	Nav	Bad Habits
"AMG"	2019	Marlo, Rylo Rodriguez, NoCap	—N/a
"Fall Threw"	2019	Rich The Kid, Young Thug	The World Is Yours 2
"Freak N You"	2019	DJ Khaled, Lil Wayne	Father of Asahd
"Legendary"	2019	Tyga	Legendary
"Pop Out Again"	2019	Polo G, Lil Baby	Die a Legend
"Anybody"	2019	Lil Keed, Lil Duke	Long Live Mexico
"Ice"	2019	Gucci Mane, Lil Baby	Delusions of Grandeur
"Woah Woah"	2019	Mustard, Young Thug	Perfect Ten
"Hold Up"	2019	Yung Bans, Young Thug	Misunderstood
"Surf"	2019	Young Thug	So Much Fun
"Pink Toes"	2019	Quality Control, Offset, DaBaby	Control the Streets, Volume 2
"All Night"	2019	Jeezy	TM104: The Legend of the Snowman
"War"	2019	Yung Mal	Iceberg
"Strings"	2019	iann dior	Industry Plant
"Big Picture"	2019	Davido, Dremo, A Boogie wit da Hoodie	A Good Time
"Diamonds"	2019	Young Thug	So Much Fun (Deluxe)
"Dior (Remix)"	2020	Pop Smoke	Meet the Woo 2 (Deluxe)
"My Hood"	2020	Marlo	1st & 3rd
"Stop Playing"	2020	Megan Thee Stallion	Suga
"Strawberry Peels"	2020	Lil Uzi Vert, Young Thug	Lil Uzi Vert vs. the World 2
"Drip Day N Night"	2020	Lil Gotit, Lil Keed	Hood Baby 2
"She Bumped Her Head"	2020	Chris Brown, Young Thug	Slime & B
"Big Slimes"	2020	Chris Brown, Young Thug, Lil Duke	Slime & B
"Codeine"	2020	Nav	Good Intentions
"Paranoia"	2020	Pop Smoke, Young Thug	Shoot for the Stars, Aim for the Moon (Deluxe)
"TLC"	2020	DaBaby	Blame It on Baby (Deluxe)
"Slide"	2020	Coi Leray	Now or Never
"Surgery"	2020	YG, Ty Dolla Sign	My Life 4Hunnid
"Powder Blue"	2020	Ty Dolla Sign	Featuring Ty Dolla Sign
"Rock Solid"	2020	Yak Gotti, Demon Child	Gotti Outta Here
"Backboard"	2020	Lil Keed	Trapped on Cleveland 3 (Deluxe)
"Diamonds on Me"	2020	DaniLeigh, Yella Beezy	Movie
"VVS"	2021	Capo Plaza	Plaza
"Emergency"	2021	21 Savage, Young Thug	Spiral: From the Book of Saw Soundtrack
"I Had"	2021	Unfoonk, Young Stoner Life	My Struggle
"Crip Drip"	2021	Quando Rondo	—N/a
"Why Why"	2021	Doja Cat	Planet Her (Deluxe)
"You Can't"	2021	G Herbo, the Kid Laroi	25
"So Long"	2021	Lil Duke, Young Stoner Life, CEO Trayle	Duke Hefner
"Water Works"	2021	Yung Bleu	Moon Boy
"Razor"	2021	Belly, PnB Rock	See You Next Wednesday
"Recognize Real"	2021	Young Thug	Punk
"Insure My Wrist"	2021	Young Thug	Punk
"Love You More"	2021	Young Thug, Nate Ruess, Jeff Bhasker	Punk
"Galaxy Ceiling"	2021	Strick	Strick Land
"Don't I"	2021	Roddy Ricch	Live Life Fast
"Today"	2022	Cordae	From a Birds Eye View
"Rackz Got Më"	2022	Yeat	2 Alive
"What Happened to Virgil"	2022	Lil Durk	7220
"Die in California"	2022	Machine Gun Kelly, Gunna, Young Thug	Mainstream Sellout
"Certified"	2022	Pooh Shiesty	Shiesty Season: Certified
"I Cannot Be (A Sadder Song)"	2022	Post Malone	Twelve Carat Toothache
"Fam Good, We Good"	2022	DJ Khaled, Roddy Ricch	God Did
"Playa"	2022	Nav	Demons Protected by Angels
"Chocolate"	2022	Quavo, Takeoff, Young Thug	Only Built for Infinity Links
"Shordie"	2022	G Herbo	Survivor's Remorse
"All the Money"	2022	Metro Boomin	Heroes & Villains
"Bitch I'm Packin'"	2024	Ice Spice	Y2K!
"It Is What It Is"	2024	Big Sean	Better Me Than You
"5 Star"	2025	Wiz Khalifa	Kush + Orange Juice 2
"Way It Is"	2025	Justin Bieber	Swag
“Different Species”	2025	Offset	Kiari
"No Smoke"	2025	DDG	Moo
"Endless Nights"	2025	Kodak Black	Just Getting Started
"HIM"	2025	Shallipopi	AURACALE
"no rush"	2026	Dina Ayada	IDENTITY
