= Won't Stop =

Won't Stop may refer to:

- "Won't Stop" (3% song)
- "Won't Stop" (Gunna song)
