= Bittersweet (Gunna song) =

2024 single by Gunna

Single by Gunna
- Released: February 16, 2024
- Length: 3:11
- Label: YSL; 300
- Songwriters: Sergio Kitchens; Tomislav Ratesic; Israel Fowobaje; Spike Jordan
- Producers: Dystinkt Beats; 1srael

Gunna singles chronology
"Happiness" (2023)	"Bittersweet" (2024)	"Prada Dem" (2024)

Music video
- "Bittersweet" on YouTube

"Bittersweet" is a song by American rapper Gunna. It was released as a single through YSL Records and 300 Entertainment on February 16, 2024. Gunna wrote the song with producers Dystinkt Beat and 1srael.

== Background and composition ==
Gunna teased the song in the week of its release; many initially thought it to be a freestyle on social media. Over minimal production containing a guitar riff and percussion, Gunna reflects on his recent difficult experiences, which concern his mental state (including paranoia and stress), drug use, women, and most notably his conflict with his YSL Records associates in light of him taking a plea deal in the label's RICO case. Certain lyrics are believed to be addressing rappers Lil Baby and Young Thug ("Shit been rough, but I ain't too tough to say I love and I miss you / You my dog, I don't care if we fall out, nigga, I never could diss you"). In addition, Gunna warns people to beware of pitfalls that arrive with their goals, mentions the success of his album A Gift & a Curse, and expresses his hope to reunite with the YSL crew.

== Critical reception ==
Zachary Horvath of HotNewHipHop regarded the instrumental to be a "nice backdrop for Gunna's heartfelt lyrics" and wrote, "This truly is one of his best songs and it sounds like it would fit right at home on this project he has brewing."

== Music video ==
The music video was directed by Spike Jordan. It takes place in a snowy landscape and finds Gunna in a mansion secluded in the mountains, trudging through blizzard conditions and wearing designer winter outfits including ones by Rick Owens and Pucci. He is surrounded by his security guards, with some of them circling his property in snowmobiles. Gunna also changes into gym gear for boxing training.

== Charts ==
Chart performance for "Bittersweet"
Chart (2024)	Peak position
New Zealand Hot Singles (RMNZ)	38
US Billboard Hot 100	82
US Hot R&B/Hip-Hop Songs (Billboard)	32
