= At My Purest =

2025 song by Gunna featuring Offset

Song by Gunna featuring Offset

from the album The Last Wun
- Released: August 8, 2025
- Length: 3:13
- Label: YSL; 300
- Songwriters: Sergio Kitchens; Kiari Cephus; Chandler Great; Gray Toomey
- Producers: Turbo; Toomey

"At My Purest" is a song by American rapper Gunna from his sixth studio album, The Last Wun (2025). It features American rapper Offset and was produced by Turbo and Gray Toomey.

== Content ==
The song finds the rappers detailing the pleasures of their extravagant lifestyle as celebrities, especially their luxury, as they list off European luxuries and Gunna mentions his real estate in Los Angeles. They also address the disadvantages, which are related to their paranoia and mistrust.

== Critical reception ==
Mackenzie Cummings-Grady of Billboard ranked "At My Purest" as the tenth best song from The Last Wun and commented "Offset and Gunna don't complement each other as well as they should. With Offset adopting Gunna's flow instead of sticking to his own cadence, the chemistry between the duo doesn't pop out of the song as much as it should. Their dynamic, as a result, struggles to shine, causing 'At My Purest' to feel less impactful than it could have been." Mosi Reeves of Rolling Stone commented that Gunna's "flow sounds plodding" on the song.

== Charts ==
Chart performance for "At My Purest"
Chart (2025)	Peak position
New Zealand Hot Singles (RMNZ)	20
US Billboard Hot 100	72
US Hot R&B/Hip-Hop Songs (Billboard)	18
