= Back to the Moon (song) =

2023 song by Gunna

Song by Gunna

from the album A Gift & a Curse
- Released: June 16, 2023
- Genre: Trap
- Length: 3:13
- Label: YSL; 300
- Songwriters: Sergio Kitchens; Kenneth Redfield Jr.; Simarpreet Bahia
- Producers: Kenny Stuntin; Sim

Music video
- "Back to the Moon" on YouTube

"Back to the Moon" is a song by American rapper Gunna, released on June 16, 2023 from his fourth studio album, A Gift & a Curse. It was produced by Kenny Stuntin and Sim.

== Composition ==
"Back to the Moon" is a trap song featuring a "squealing" guitar in the background, which Robin Murray of Clash described as carrying an 80s appeal.

== Critical reception ==
Alexander Cole of HotNewHipHop commented that the song was one of the "stronger" tracks from A Gift & a Curse and "further proof that the music world was in need of some new Gunna music." Similarly, Hamza Riaz of Mic Cheque considered it among the best tracks from the album. Reviewing the album for Vulture, Paul Thompson criticized the song, describing it as one "where a series of otherwise compelling thoughts about Gunna's newly isolated state seem disconnected, his blunt, seesawing cadence acting like little crescendos that ramp up and peter out." In addition, he cited it as one of the tracks whose beats "make Gunna songs sound like interchangeable TV-sync fodder".

== Music video ==
An official music video was released alongside the song. It shows Gunna rapping on the moon with a blunt in his hand at certain points.

== Charts ==
Chart performance for "Back to the Moon"
Chart (2023)	Peak position
Canada Hot 100 (Billboard)	56
Global 200 (Billboard)	69
New Zealand Hot Singles (RMNZ)	5
UK Singles (OCC)	72
US Billboard Hot 100	29
US Hot R&B/Hip-Hop Songs (Billboard)	10

== Certifications ==
Certifications for "Back to the Moon"
Region	Certification	Certified units/sales
Canada (Music Canada)	Gold	40,000^{‡}
United States (RIAA)	Gold	500,000^{‡}
^{‡} Sales+streaming figures based on certification alone.
