= Style Rare =

2024 single by Offset and Gunna

Single by Offset and Gunna
- Released: June 28, 2024
- Genre: Pop rap; trap
- Length: 3:28
- Label: Motown
- Songwriters: Kiari Cephus; Sergio Kitchens
- Producer: Nyrell

Offset singles chronology
"Risk Taker" (2024)	"Style Rare" (2024)	"Swing My Way" (2024)

Gunna singles chronology
"Tiffany (B)" (2024)	"Style Rare" (2024)	"Receipts" (2024)

Music video
- "Style Rare" on YouTube

"Style Rare" is a single by American rappers Offset and Gunna, released on June 28, 2024 alongside a music video. It was produced by Nyrell.

== Composition and lyrics ==
The song finds the rappers boastfully listing off their luxury possessions, including jewelry and cars, over a "slightly funky pop rap beat" that is mainly composed of synths. On the chorus, they trade lyrics back and forth, finishing each other's sentences. Offset and Gunna perform the opening and second verses respectively. In addition, Offset briefly mentions traveling to Florence and Dubai, and Gunna details his personal achievements and shouts out to the late fashion designer Virgil Abloh. In the first two lines of his verse, Gunna references his plea deal in the YSL Records RICO case while insisting he would not betray his associates: "Won't trade my team, I could never be a traitor / Like Raiders, we ball, never thought they would raid us".

== Music video ==
The music video was directed by Offset and Joshua "Mid Jordan" Farias. It sees the rappers performing in front of a wall of screens in a white room; the setting is reminiscent of the "Source" from The Matrix films. They are seen wearing all-black outfits and dancing. The clip also shows women performing choreography.

== Charts ==
Chart performance for "Style Rare"
Chart (2024)	Peak position
New Zealand Hot Singles (RMNZ)	38
US Hot R&B/Hip-Hop Songs (Billboard)	49
