= On One Tonight =

2024 song by Gunna

Promotional single by Gunna

from the album One of Wun
- Released: May 10, 2024
- Length: 1:30
- Label: YSL; 300
- Songwriters: Sergio Kitchens; Kenneth Redfield Jr.; Nathan Lamarche
- Producers: Kenny Stuntin; Nash

"On One Tonight" is a promotional single by American rapper Gunna from his fifth studio album, One of Wun (2024). It was produced by Kenny Stuntin and Nash.

== Content ==
The song is about Gunna being successful and committed to thrive in spite of the criticism he has received; he confronts his critics who expect his downfall.

== Critical reception ==
Alphonse Pierre of Pitchfork noted the song as an example in which Gunna is "making songs that sound like catchy Gunna songs of the past—he's still able to float on these laid-back, skittering ATL trap variants while reading straight off his SSENSE receipt—but they don't feel like them." Pierre stated that "He's made 'On One Tonight,' with its humming beat and limp croons, a dozen times before".

== Charts ==
=== Weekly charts ===
Weekly chart performance for "On One Tonight"
Chart (2024–2025)	Peak position
Canada Hot 100 (Billboard)	67
Global 200 (Billboard)	120
Greece International (IFPI)	57
Ireland (IRMA)	98
New Zealand Hot Singles (RMNZ)	16
UK Singles (Official Charts)	52
UK Hip Hop/R&B (Official Charts)	12
US Billboard Hot 100	54
US Hot R&B/Hip-Hop Songs (Billboard)	21

=== Year-end charts ===
Year-end chart performance for "On One Tonight"
Chart (2025)	Position
US Hot R&B/Hip-Hop Songs (Billboard)	75

== Certifications ==
Certifications for "On One Tonight"
Region	Certification	Certified units/sales
Australia (ARIA)	Platinum	70,000^{‡}
Canada (Music Canada)	Platinum	80,000^{‡}
New Zealand (RMNZ)	Platinum	30,000^{‡}
Nigeria (TCSN)	Silver	25,000^{‡}
United Kingdom (BPI)	Gold	400,000^{‡}
^{‡} Sales+streaming figures based on certification alone.
