= Sakpase =

2025 song by Gunna

Song by Gunna

from the album The Last Wun
- Released: August 8, 2025
- Length: 2:13
- Label: YSL; 300
- Songwriters: Sergio Kitchens; Chandler Great; Kenneth Redfield Jr.; Nathan Lamarche; William Lambert
- Producers: Turbo; Kenny Stuntin; Nash; ThankYouWill

"Sakpase" is a song by American rapper Gunna from his sixth studio album, The Last Wun (2025). It was produced by Turbo, Kenny Stuntin, Nash and ThankYouWill.

== Content ==
The song finds Gunna performing in a quick flow as he details his luxury. In one of his lyrics, he compares a yacht's drift to his Rolls-Royce Wraith.

== Critical reception ==
Mackenzie Cummings-Grady of Billboard placed "Sakpase" at number 19 in her ranking of the tracks from The Last Wun, writing "Gunna's 'Sakpase' showcases the rapper's tight, rapid-fire flow, but the energy flatlines about halfway through. Wunna doesn't sound excited to be engaging in the lavish lifestyle he lives, and offers solid motivational gems with a shoulder shrug." Mosi Reeves of Rolling Stone commented "Gunna drops some nice bars on 'Sakpase' as he raps, 'Sak pase? Brand new tracks, ándale/I'm connected through checks and got pounds of this cake (yeah).'"

== Charts ==
Chart performance for "Sakpase"
Chart (2025)	Peak position
New Zealand Hot Singles (RMNZ)	23
US Billboard Hot 100	70
US Hot R&B/Hip-Hop Songs (Billboard)	17
