= Won't Stop (Gunna song) =

2025 single by Gunna

Single by Gunna

from the album The Last Wun
- Released: June 13, 2025
- Length: 3:01
- Label: YSL; 300
- Songwriters: Sergio Kitchens; Chandler Great
- Producer: Turbo

Gunna singles chronology
"Gulfstream" (2025)	"Won't Stop" (2025)	"WGFT" / "No Smoke" (2025)

Music video
- "Won't Stop" on YouTube

"Won't Stop" is a song by American rapper Gunna. It was released through YSL Records and 300 Entertainment as the second single from his sixth studio album, The Last Wun, on June 13, 2025. Gunna wrote the song with producer Turbo.

== Composition ==
The production contains "dark" piano keys and drums. The lyrics finds Gunna in a defiant mood and center around his resilience during adversity, riches, success and focus on personal growth and achieving wealth. He also alludes to the backlash he has received from his RICO charges related to the YSL Records racketeering trial, dismissing it without apology. On July 1, 2025, Gunna released a music video for the single, which sees him undergoing sports training in a laboratory. It also advertises Flerish, a drink brand co-owned by Gunna. Armon Sadler of Vibe considered the song "possibly one of the best records he has dropped since his last album One of Wun", additionally writing "It feels like the momentum he had since getting out of jail has tapered off a bit, and now he can establish a legitimate run. 'Won't Stop' is the right approach."

== Charts ==
Chart performance for "Won't Stop"
Chart (2025)	Peak position
Canada Hot 100 (Billboard)	91
New Zealand Hot Singles (RMNZ)	17
US Billboard Hot 100	70
US Hot R&B/Hip-Hop Songs (Billboard)	17
