= WGFT (song) =

2025 song by Gunna featuring Burna Boy

- Cover art of the official remix featuring Chris Brown.

Single by Gunna featuring Burna Boy

from the album The Last Wun
- Released: August 7, 2025
- Genre: Hip-hop; trap
- Length: 3:04
- Label: YSL; 300
- Songwriters: Sergio Kitchens; Damini Ogulu; Chandler Great; Ashot Akopian
- Producers: Turbo; Shottie

Gunna singles chronology
"Won't Stop" (2025)	"WGFT" / "No Smoke" (2025)	"No Heart" (2025)

Burna Boy singles chronology
"Love" (2025)	"WGFT" (2025)	"Dai Dai" (2026)

Music video
- "WGFT" on YouTube

"WGFT" (an acronym for "We Gettin' Fucked Tonight", and censored for radio as "She Goin' Up Tonight") is a song by American rapper Gunna featuring Nigerian singer Burna Boy. It was sent to US rhythmic radio as the third and final single from Gunna's sixth studio album, The Last Wun, on August 7, 2025. The two artists wrote the song with producers Turbo and Shootie. An official remix featuring American singer Chris Brown was released on January 16, 2026.

== Critical reception ==
Mackenzie Cummings-Grady of Billboard ranked "WGFT" as the sixth best song from The Last Wun, writing "While Burna Boy has delivered stronger verses in the past, the Afro-fusion star effortlessly outshines Gunna on 'WGFT.' With his signature suave sophistication, Burna brings a refreshing energy to the track, though his verse feels disappointingly brief. Nonetheless, his contribution injects a much-needed dose of Afro flair, offering a dynamic and welcomed shift within Gunna's sonic landscape." Aron A. of HotNewHipHop stated that Burna Boy's verse "drapes moody sensuality over the beat".

== Charts ==
=== Weekly charts ===
Weekly chart performance for "WGFT"
Chart (2025–2026)	Peak position
Australia (ARIA)	96
Australia Hip Hop/R&B (ARIA)	10
Canada Hot 100 (Billboard)	46
Germany (GfK)	92
Global 200 (Billboard)	60
Greece International (IFPI)	56
Ireland (IRMA)	82
Netherlands (Single Top 100)	97
New Zealand (Recorded Music NZ)	29
Nigeria (TurnTable Top 100)	18
Portugal (AFP)	111
South Africa Streaming (TOSAC)	8
Sweden (Sverigetopplistan)	91
Switzerland (Schweizer Hitparade)	29
UK Singles (Official Charts)	22
UK Hip Hop/R&B (Official Charts)	2
US Billboard Hot 100	16
US Hot R&B/Hip-Hop Songs (Billboard)	5
US R&B/Hip-Hop Airplay (Billboard)	4
US Rhythmic Airplay (Billboard)	1

Weekly chart performance for "WGFT" (Remix)
Chart (2026)	Peak position
New Zealand Hot Singles (RMNZ)	9

=== Year-end charts ===
Year-end chart performance for "WGFT"
Chart (2025)	Position
US Hot R&B/Hip-Hop Songs (Billboard)	84

== Certifications ==
Certifications for "WGFT"
Region	Certification	Certified units/sales
New Zealand (RMNZ)	Platinum	30,000^{‡}
Nigeria (TCSN)	Platinum	100,000^{‡}
Portugal (AFP)	Gold	12,000^{‡}
United Kingdom (BPI)	Gold	400,000^{‡}
^{‡} Sales+streaming figures based on certification alone.
