= Bread & Butter (song) =

2023 single by Gunna

Single by Gunna

from the album A Gift & a Curse
- Released: June 2, 2023
- Genre: Trap
- Length: 3:46
- Label: YSL; 300
- Songwriters: Sergio Kitchens; Chandler Durham; Omar Perrin; Cameron Griffin
- Producers: Turbo; Omar Grand; Cam Griffin

Gunna singles chronology
"Brodies" (2023)	"Bread & Butter" (2023)	"FukUMean" (2023)

Music video
- "Bread & Butter" on YouTube

"Bread & Butter" (stylized in lowercase) is a song by American rapper Gunna. It was released through YSL Records and 300 Entertainment as the lead single from his fourth studio album, A Gift & a Curse, on June 2, 2023. Written alongside producers Turbo, Omar Grand, and Cam Griffin, the song was mastered by Joe LaPorta.

== Composition and lyrics ==
Lyrically, Gunna addresses his 2022 arrest alongside YSL founder and label boss Young Thug and other members of the label as he also addresses people deeming him a "snitch" after being released after taking an Alford plea months before Thug, who was still incarcerated at the time of the release of "Bread & Butter", which is a rhythmic trap song. On the song, Gunna calls out people who referred to him as a "snitch" following his release from jail in late 2022 after being arrested earlier in the year: "Never gave no statement or agreed to take no stand on 'em / Whatever you niggas on, then trust me, I'ma stand on it / Lawyers and that DA did some sneaky shit, I fell for it / On my P's and Q's because this time I be prepared for it". He also references former friends of his that turned against him once he was free again after believing that he took the stand on Young Thug and other friends: "Peepin' shit, I'm seein' n-ggas fall back / You bitch-ass n-ggas got me as the topic of the chat / You switched on me when you know you in business with a rat / And the boy that's like your brother, and nobody speak on that".

== Charts ==
Chart performance for "Bread & Butter"
Chart (2023)	Peak position
Canada Hot 100 (Billboard)	56
Global 200 (Billboard)	111
New Zealand Hot Singles (RMNZ)	22
UK Singles (Official Charts)	63
UK Hip Hop/R&B (Official Charts)	31
US Billboard Hot 100	48
US Hot R&B/Hip-Hop Songs (Billboard)	16

== Certifications ==
Certifications for "Bread & Butter"
Region	Certification	Certified units/sales
Canada (Music Canada)	Gold	40,000^{‡}
^{‡} Sales+streaming figures based on certification alone.
