= Prada Dem =

2024 single by Gunna featuring Offset

Single by Gunna featuring Offset

from the album One of Wun
- Released: March 15, 2024
- Genre: Trap
- Length: 2:45
- Label: YSL; 300
- Songwriters: Sergio Kitchens; Kiari Cephus; Kenneth Gilmore; Amman Nurani; Adam Fritzler
- Producers: Aviator Keyyz; Evrgrn; Fritz!

Gunna singles chronology
| "Bittersweet" (2024) | "Prada Dem" (2024) | "1:59" (2024) |

Offset singles chronology
| "Cuffed (Jo tha Mila)" (2024) | "Prada Dem" (2024) | "Exit 9" (2024) |

Music video
- "Prada Dem" on YouTube

"Prada Dem" is a single by American rapper Gunna featuring fellow American rapper Offset. It was released through YSL Records and 300 Entertainment as the lead single from Gunna's fifth studio album, One of Wun, on March 15, 2024. Gunna and Offset wrote the song with producers Aviator Keyyz, Evrgrn, and Fritz!. The day before the release of the song, Gunna hinted at a collaboration with Offset by posting blurry pictures of the two on social media.

== Composition and lyrics ==
"Prada Dem" is a trap song that sees Gunna and Offset bragging about making expensive purchases and touching on personal struggles, as the former addresses allegations made against him that he "snitched" on co-defendants during the YSL Records trial: "I set the trend, I'm a trendsetter / I'm not a rat, still gettin' cheddar".

== Music video ==
The official music video for "Prada Dem", directed by Leff was released alongside the song on March 15, 2024. It sees Gunna and Offset in New York City as they go through the city and stop at the Prada store at 5th Avenue, where they stop and pose for a private photo shoot. The two also wear sunglasses that were designed by Prada and make expensive purchases at the store.

== Charts ==
=== Weekly charts ===
Weekly chart performance for "Prada Dem"
| Chart (2024) | Peak position |
|---|---|
| Canada Hot 100 (Billboard) | 60 |
| Global 200 (Billboard) | 120 |
| Greece International (IFPI) | 73 |
| New Zealand Hot Singles (RMNZ) | 7 |
| US Billboard Hot 100 | 54 |
| US Hot R&B/Hip-Hop Songs (Billboard) | 20 |
| US Rhythmic Airplay (Billboard) | 24 |

=== Year-end charts ===
2024 year-end chart performance for "Prada Dem"
| Chart (2024) | Position |
|---|---|
| US Hot R&B/Hip-Hop Songs (Billboard) | 72 |

== Certifications ==
Certifications for "Prada Dem"
| Region | Certification | Certified units/sales |
|---|---|---|
| Canada (Music Canada) | Gold | 40,000^{‡} |
| South Africa (RISA) | Gold | 20,000^{‡} |
| United States (RIAA) | Gold | 500,000^{‡} |
^{‡} Sales+streaming figures based on certification alone.
