= Just Say Dat =

2025 song by Gunna

Song by Gunna

from the album The Last Wun
- Released: August 8, 2025
- Length: 2:03
- Label: YSL; 300
- Songwriters: Sergio Kitchens; Leutrim Beqiri; Vikram Dhami
- Producers: Byrd; Slick Made That

Music video
- "Just Say Dat" on YouTube

"Just Say Dat" is a song by American rapper Gunna from his sixth studio album, The Last Wun (2025). It was produced by Byrd and Slick Made That. The lyrics find Gunna taking aim at rappers who have discounted him.

== Critical reception ==
Mackenzie Cummings-Grady of Billboard placed the song at number 18 in her ranking of the tracks from The Last Wun, writing "Gunna again slips right back into the vibe that suits him best, tackling a icy-smooth Turbo beat that's become his bread and butter. 'Just Say Dat' comes and goes without much impact, checking all the boxes of a catchy Gunna song without leaving any of his usual earworm residuals." Mosi Reeves of Rolling Stone wrote that the song "has a terrifically sinuous beat".

== Music video ==
An official music video was released on August 11, 2025. Directed by Spike Jordan, it opens with comedians Desi Banks and Reggie Conquest arguing in front of a Food Mart. Gunna's motorcade of three Maybachs speeds past them, leaving them awestruck. The rest of the clip sees Gunna and the Maybachs driving around Atlanta, through a neighborhood as well. They pass the Mercedes-Benz Stadium and take over the Food Mart parking lot. Gunna also rides alongside Turbo along the coast, during which he smokes cigars.

== Charts ==
Chart performance for "Just Say Dat"
Chart (2025)	Peak position
Canada Hot 100 (Billboard)	85
Global 200 (Billboard)	134
New Zealand Hot Singles (RMNZ)	15
UK Singles (OCC)	86
US Billboard Hot 100	46
US Hot R&B/Hip-Hop Songs (Billboard)	10
