= Pop It (Gunna song) =

2026 single by Gunna

Single by Gunna

from the album Splurge
- Released: October 9, 2026
- Genre: Trap
- Length: 2:18
- Label: Gunna Music
- Songwriters: Sergio Kitchens; Darnell Carr Jr.
- Producer: Lord Capp

Gunna singles chronology
"Too Bad" (2026)	"Pop It" (2026)

Music video
- "Pop It" on YouTube

"Pop It" is a song by American rapper Gunna, released on October 9, 2026, via Gunna Music. It is the lead single from his upcoming seventh studio album Splurge (2026).

== Composition ==
The song pairs trap drums with a synth fanfare in the production. Lyrically, Gunna raps about his lavish lifestyle, including his luxury cars such as a Rolls-Royce with the Starlight Headliner feature and Mercedes-Benz; he describes finding it difficult to choose which car to drive and opting for a chauffeur so he would not need to restrict his drinking.

== Music video ==
An official music video was released on the same day as the song and directed by Spike Jordan. The opening scene shows Gunna playing tennis with tennis player Coco Gauff, at a court featuring a damask carpet and chandelier, before transitioning to a helicopter scene above the ocean and nearby cliffside mansion in California. Gunna flies to the mansion and arrives at a party there with his love interest. He explores the estate and raps alongside exotic sports cars, while dressed in various luxury suits from brands such as Miu Miu and Bottega Veneta. When Gunna returns to playing tennis, he accidentally hits the ball through a glass of wine held by a butler, shattering it.

== Charts ==
Chart performance for "Pop It"
Chart (2026)	Peak position
Canada Hot 100 (Billboard)	88
New Zealand Hot Singles (RMNZ)	17
Nigeria (TurnTable Top 100)	46
South Africa Streaming (TOSAC)	19
US Billboard Hot 100	55
US Hot R&B/Hip-Hop Songs (Billboard)	12
US Rhythmic Airplay (Billboard)	21
