= FukUMean =

2023 single by Gunna

Single by Gunna

from the album A Gift & a Curse
- Released: July 11, 2023
- Recorded: 2023
- Genre: Hip-hop; trap
- Length: 2:05
- Label: YSL; 300
- Songwriters: Sergio Kitchens; Florian Ongonga; Lucas DiFabbio
- Producers: Flo; Dunk Rock

Gunna singles chronology
"Bread & Butter" (2023)	"FukUMean" (2023)	"Day Off" (2023)

Music video
- "FukUMean" on YouTube

"FukUMean" (edited for radio as "UMean" or "F**UMean") (stylized in lowercase letters and pronounced "fuck you mean") is a song by American rapper Gunna. It was sent to rhythmic contemporary radio through YSL Records and 300 Entertainment as the second and final single from his fourth studio album, A Gift & a Curse, on July 11, 2023. Gunna wrote the song with producers Flo and Dunk Rock.

== Composition ==
The song contains "flute melodies with some lightly plucked strings and piano" in production, along with bass, hi-hat and snare. In the lyrics, Gunna centers on his fame and lifestyle of wealth, drugs, and women, while also taking aim at his haters.

== Critical reception ==
The song received generally positive reviews from critics. Gabriel Bras Nevares of HotNewHipHop praised Gunna's performance, writing "his flow on here plays to his strengths, and it's one he's proven to rock with each song. Furthermore, his easy switch-ups between measured lines and faster rhymes make each stanza more enjoyable to experience." Regarding the lyrical content, he stated "To be fair, if Gunna didn't go deeper on these themes on other tracks, some lines here might seem tone-deaf considering the conversation around his snitching allegations. But regardless, he gives listeners a reason to perk their ears up with catchy vocalizations and a killer beat." Nevares also wrote of the production, "Ultimately, the deep bass hits, shifting hi-hat patterns, and sharp snare turn this peaceful sonic pallet into a heater." Complex's Eric Skelton and Stefan Breskin both considered it the best song from A Gift & a Curse. In an album review for Rolling Stone, Mark Braboy described the tracks from "Ca$h $hit" to "P Angels" as "by far the best sequencing of songs on a hip-hop record this year, especially the transition from the Dunk Rock-produced 'fukumean' to the exhilarating 'Rodeo Dr'"; Breskin similarly commented the transition to be "as smooth as butter". Slant Magazine's Paul Attard stated the song "might just be the sleekest Gunna has sounded in a hot minute, and serves a nice reprieve from the album's prevailingly bleak operatics." Alphonse Pierre of Pitchfork commented, "He's better off on songs like 'Fukumean,' where he goes back-to-the-basics—smoking good weed, thinking about boobs—deploying the explosive, run-on flow he nailed down around Drip Harder." Hamza Riaz of Mic Cheque regarded it as one of the "only instances of Gunna having his usual fun" and best tracks from the album. Yousef Srour of HipHopDX gave a negative review of the song, deeming it "feels cliché" and the lyrics "Ice, lil' bird, shittin' on all you lil' turds" as among the lines of the album that "stick out like sore thumbs".

== Charts ==
=== Weekly charts ===
Weekly chart performance for "FukUMean"
Chart (2023)	Peak position
Australia (ARIA)	7
Austria (Ö3 Austria Top 40)	18
Canada Hot 100 (Billboard)	3
Czech Republic Singles Digital (ČNS IFPI)	34
Denmark (Tracklisten)	31
Finland (Suomen virallinen lista)	41
France (SNEP)	85
Germany (GfK)	17
Global 200 (Billboard)	6
Hungary (Single Top 40)	35
Iceland (Tónlistinn)	17
Ireland (IRMA)	9
Italy (FIMI)	92
Latvia (LaIPA)	1
Lebanon Airplay (Lebanese Top 20)	8
Lithuania (AGATA)	8
MENA (IFPI)	9
Netherlands (Single Top 100)	48
New Zealand (Recorded Music NZ)	3
Norway (VG-lista)	29
Poland (Polish Streaming Top 100)	39
Portugal (AFP)	41
Slovakia Singles Digital (ČNS IFPI)	10
South Africa Streaming (TOSAC)	4
Sweden (Sverigetopplistan)	40
Switzerland (Schweizer Hitparade)	11
UAE (IFPI)	14
UK Singles (Official Charts)	7
UK Hip Hop/R&B (Official Charts)	3
US Billboard Hot 100	4
US Hot R&B/Hip-Hop Songs (Billboard)	1
US Rhythmic Airplay (Billboard)	1

=== Year-end charts ===
2023 year-end chart performance for "FukUMean"
Chart (2023)	Position
Australia (ARIA)	77
Austria (Ö3 Austria Top 40)	68
Canada (Canadian Hot 100)	24
Germany (Official German Charts)	84
Global 200 (Billboard)	84
Hungary (Single Top 40)	72
Switzerland (Schweizer Hitparade)	60
UK Singles (OCC)	79
US Billboard Hot 100	31
US Hot R&B/Hip-Hop Songs (Billboard)	10
US Rhythmic (Billboard)	27

2024 year-end chart performance for "FukUMean"
Chart (2024)	Position
Australia Hip Hop/R&B (ARIA)	43
Canada (Canadian Hot 100)	96
Global 200 (Billboard)	128
US Billboard Hot 100	85
US Hot R&B/Hip-Hop Songs (Billboard)	31

== Certifications ==
Certifications for "FukUMean"
Region	Certification	Certified units/sales
Australia (ARIA)	Platinum	70,000^{‡}
Austria (IFPI Austria)	Gold	15,000^{‡}
Canada (Music Canada)	7× Platinum	560,000^{‡}
Denmark (IFPI Danmark)	Gold	45,000^{‡}
France (SNEP)	Platinum	200,000^{‡}
Germany (BVMI)	Gold	300,000^{‡}
Italy (FIMI)	Gold	50,000^{‡}
Netherlands (NVPI)	Gold	46,500^{‡}
New Zealand (RMNZ)	2× Platinum	60,000^{‡}
Nigeria (TCSN)	Gold	50,000^{‡}
Poland (ZPAV)	Platinum	50,000^{‡}
Portugal (AFP)	Platinum	10,000^{‡}
South Africa (RISA)	2× Platinum	80,000^{‡}
Switzerland (IFPI Switzerland)	Platinum	30,000^{‡}
United Kingdom (BPI)	Platinum	600,000^{‡}
United States (RIAA)	4× Platinum	4,000,000^{‡}
Streaming
Greece (IFPI Greece)	Gold	1,000,000^{†}
^{‡} Sales+streaming figures based on certification alone.^{†} Streaming-only figures based on certification alone.

== Release history ==
Release history and formats for "FukUMean"
Region	Date	Format	Label	Ref.
United States	July 11, 2023	Rhythmic contemporary radio	YSL; 300	
