= WhatsApp (Wassam) =

2024 single by Gunna

Single by Gunna

from the album One of Wun
- Released: May 3, 2024
- Length: 2:28
- Label: YSL; 300
- Songwriters: Sergio Kitchens; Chandler Great; Amman Nurani
- Producers: Turbo; Evrgrn

Gunna singles chronology
"1:59" (2024)	"WhatsApp (Wassam)" (2024)	"Jump" (2024)

Music video
- "WhatsApp (Wassam)" on YouTube

"WhatsApp (Wassam)" is a song by American rapper Gunna. It was released through YSL Records and 300 Entertainment as the second single from his fifth studio album, One of Wun, on May 3, 2024. Gunna wrote the song with producers Turbo and Evrgrn.

== Background ==
On April 21, 2024, Gunna previewed the song on social media. Prior to its release and the disclosure of the title, it was called "Push Back" by listeners due to the constant use of the phrase in the chorus. Turbo told Billboard that the chorus was inspired by a six figure wire transfer that Gunna received to perform at a private party.

== Content ==
The song finds Gunna boasting his wealth, accomplishments in life, and outdoing his competition. He also shouts out to Complex.

== Critical reception ==
Ahmad Davis of Rap-Up commented that Gunna's "exclamatory tone pairs well with the upbeat production, seeking to address any of his doubters one verse at a time."

== Music video ==
An official music video was released on May 13, 2024. Directed by Spike Jordan, it sees Gunna being tailored for a photoshoot, boarding a private jet, attending a meeting, wiring money, traveling around the world, and preparing for his show in the Bittersweet Tour. Throughout the video, he makes various video calls with his contacts via WhatsApp, including rapper Flo Milli.

== Charts ==
Chart performance for "WhatsApp (Wassam)"
Chart (2024)	Peak position
Canada Hot 100 (Billboard)	94
Global 200 (Billboard)	152
New Zealand Hot Singles (RMNZ)	27
US Billboard Hot 100	62
US Hot R&B/Hip-Hop Songs (Billboard)	24
