= The Last Wun =

2025 studio album by Gunna

Studio album by Gunna
- Released: August 8, 2025
- Length: 68:53
- Labels: YSL; 300
- Producers: Gunna; 254Bash; 254Bodi; Adriano; Aviator Keyyz; Byrd; Clarke; Doc Maestro; Don Oskar; Eest.id; Evince; Evrgrn; Flo; Sammy Haig; Haze; Jacobsen; Kabeh; Kenny Stuntin; Keyon; Kizzy; MacShooter; MM; Nash; Omar Grand; Pi Polish; Shootie; Sim; Slick Made That; Swirve; ThankYouWill; Turbo; X-plosive; Yung Bleu; Yung Talent

Gunna chronology
One of Wun (2024)	The Last Wun (2025)	Splurge (TBA)

Singles from The Last Wun
- 1. "Him All Along" Released: October 18, 2024; 2. "Won't Stop" Released: June 13, 2025; 3. "WGFT" Released: October 7, 2025

The Last Wun is the sixth studio album by American rapper Gunna. It was released on August 8, 2025 through YSL Records and 300 Entertainment. Gunna primarily recorded the album between 2024 and 2025, and would reveal that the album is his final under YSL Records. The album features guest appearances from Offset, Burna Boy, Wizkid, Nechie, and Asake. Production was primarily handled by Turbo alongside Kenny Stuntin, Evrgrn, Omar Grand, Yung Bleu, and Gunna himself, among others. The album was supported by three singles: "Him All Along", "Won't Stop", and "WGFT", the latter of which features Burna Boy.

== Background and promotion ==
Gunna released the lead single of the album, "Him All Along", on October 18, 2024. He announced that the album would be released in June of the following year through an Instagram post on May 17, 2025. However, this was delayed for unknown reasons. Gunna released the second single of the album, "Won't Stop", on June 13. He revealed the title of the album on June 28 in an interview with American musician and actor will.i.am for Uproxx. Gunna announced its release date and shared its cover art on August 4, along with a pre-order being made available on Apple Music. The third and final single of the album, "WGFT", which features Nigerian singer Burna Boy, was sent to US rhythmic radio on October 7, 2025.

== Critical reception ==
Professional ratings
Review scores
Source	Rating
Rolling Stone	3.5/5 stars

In a review for Rolling Stone, Mosi Reeves wrote: "At 25 songs, there's too many tracks, but the effect isn't necessarily bad. The album lasts a bit over an hour and has peaks and valleys typical of modern rap's onomatopoeic nature, where verses and choruses float by in a murky, addled stream." Aron A. of HotNewHipHop stated that The Last Wun "can feel overextended" due to its length, adding: "Gunna's music works as ambient luxury—easy to let play without much thought—which has been both his gift and limitation. There's little growth beyond his well-worn strengths, even if his personal life has evolved."

== Commercial performance ==
In the United States, The Last Wun debuted at number three on the Billboard 200 with 80,000 album-equivalent units (including 1,000 in pure album sales) in its first week. This became Gunna's seventh top ten entry on the chart. The album also accumulated a total of 104.49 million on-demand streams of the album's songs.

== Track listing ==
The Last Wun track listing
No.	Title	Writer(s)	Producer(s)	Length
1.	"Many Nights"	Sergio Kitchens; Darnell Carr Jr.; Chandler Great	Turbo; Kizzy	2:07
2.	"Let That Sink In"	Kitchens; Great; Omar Perrin	Turbo; Omar Grand	3:05
3.	"Just Say Dat"	Kitchens; Leutrim Beqiri; Vikram Dhami; Great	Turbo; Byrd; Slick Made That	2:03
4.	"GP"	Kitchens; Great; Perrin	Turbo; Grand	1:32
5.	"Sakpase"	Kitchens; Great; Kenneth Redfield Jr.; Nathan Lamarche; William Lambert	Turbo; Kenny Stuntin; Nash; ThankYouWill	2:13
6.	"At My Purest" (featuring Offset)	Kitchens; Kiari Cephus; Great; Gray Toomey	Turbo; Toomey	3:13
7.	"Biting My Game"	Kitchens; Carr; Jesse Evans; Great; Lucas de Mota Siqueira	Turbo; Kizzy; Evince; Kabeh	2:24
8.	"Prototype"	Kitchens; Michael Fialkow; Great; Redfield	Turbo; Kenny Stuntin; MM	2:55
9.	"WGFT" (featuring Burna Boy)	Kitchens; Ashot Akopian; Great; Damini Ogulu	Turbo; Shottie	3:04
10.	"Forever Be Mine" (featuring Wizkid)	Kitchens; Simarpreet Bahia; Ayodeji Balogun; Great; Amman Nurani; Segrate Price; Markeevius Smith	Turbo; Evrgrn; Sim; Doc Maestro; Pi Polish	2:53
11.	"Again"	Kitchens; Carr; Great; Sammy Haig	Turbo; Kizzy; Haig	3:00
12.	"Endless"	Kitchens; Great; Jeppe Jacobsen; Redfield	Turbo; Kenny Stuntin; Jacobsen	2:06
13.	"I Can't Feel My Face" (featuring Nechie)	Kitchens; Great; Ceron Lee; Nurani; Luc Randmaa	Turbo; Evrgrn; Don Oskar	3:01
14.	"Podcast"	Kitchens; Great; Dennis Lukowski; Thomas Kessler; Florian Ongonga; Dirk Ruus	Turbo; X-plosive; Eest.id; DLS	2:55
15.	"Club House"	Kitchens; Great; Jacobsen; Redfield	Turbo; Kenny Stuntin; Jacobsen	2:45
16.	"Satisfaction" (featuring Asake)	Kitchens; Great; Kenneth Gilmore; Camen Martin	Turbo; Aviator Keyyz; Yung Talent	3:41
17.	"Fuck Witcha Boy"	Kitchens; Great; Perrin; Redfield	Turbo; Kenny Stuntin; Grand	3:25
18.	"On Me"	Kitchens; Great; Ethan Hayes; Kessler; Ongonga	Turbo; Flo; Haze; X-plosive	2:50
19.	"Rare Occasion"	Kitchens; Carr; Great; Yauheni Kurhan	Turbo; Kizzy; Solt Boy	3:05
20.	"Made for This Shit"	Kitchens; Great; Ellis Newton; Redfield	Turbo; Kenny Stuntin; Swirve	2:13
21.	"CFWM"	Kitchens; Great; Nurani; Redfield	Gunna; Turbo; Kenny Stuntin; Evrgrn	2:46
22.	"What They Thinking"	Kitchens; Adrian Allahverdi; Patrick Bodi; William Clarke; Great; Sacha Katz	Turbo; Adriano; 254Bodi; 254Bash; Clarke	2:44
23.	"Showed Em"	Kitchens; Kayden Davis; Great; Kessler; Maximilian McFarlin; Ongonga	Turbo; Flo; X-plosive; MacShooter; Keyon	3:03
24.	"Won't Stop"	Kitchens; Great	Turbo	3:01
25.	"Him All Along"	Kitchens; Jeremy Biddle; Great	Turbo; Yung Bleu; Nate B^{[a]}	2:38
Total length:				68:53

=== Notes ===
- All song titles are stylized in all lowercase.
- ^{^[a]} signifies an additional producer

== Personnel ==
Credits adapted from Tidal.

=== Musicians ===
- Gunna – vocals
- Florian "Flo" Ongonga – additional arrangement
- Offset – vocals (track 6)
- Burna Boy – vocals (9)
- Wizkid – vocals (10)
- Nechie – vocals (13)
- Asake – vocals (16)
- Corey Cooper – guitar (17)
- Ben Rugg – piano (22)

=== Technical ===
- Joe LaPorta – mastering
- Florian "Flo" Ongonga – engineering
- Otis Millstone – engineering (9)
- Aidan Duncan – engineering (10)
- Deli Banger – engineering (13)
- Jesse Ray Ernster – vocal mixing (9)
- Leandro "Dro" Hidalgo – vocal mixing (10)
- Jonathan Buchanan – engineering assistance (1)
- William Woodworth – engineering assistance (1, 2, 7)
- Erick Solis – engineering assistance (2, 19)
- Kirby Hall – engineering assistance (3)
- Jesse Navarro – engineering assistance (4, 20)
- Jordan Rahberger – engineering assistance (4, 7)
- Ben Rugg – engineering assistance (5, 6, 13, 22, 23)
- Hannah Essie Hausman – engineering assistance (5)
- Liam Weiland – engineering assistance (6)
- J. Shiver – engineering assistance (7, 8)
- Terren Gallegros – engineering (7)
- Tiernan Anderson – engineering assistance (8)
- Daniel Kamerman-Gilk – engineering assistance (10)
- Jacob Stewart – engineering assistance (10)
- Allison Holmes – engineering assistance (11)
- Vince Pates – enginereing assistance (13)
- Jordan O'Brien – engineering assistance (14, 17)
- Theodore Smart St. Louis – engineering assistance (14)
- Ryan "Rain" Lauer – engineering assistance (15, 16)
- Gabriel Gebremdhin – engineering assistance (17)
- Moms – engineering assisetance (18)
- Alexander Mcdaniel – engineering assistance (19)
- Brandon Kalivado – engineering assistance (20)
- Big Trace – engineering assistance (21)
- Zachary Lamb – engineering assistance (21)
- Rachel Shoemake – engineering assistance (22)
- Ananda Dhar-James – engineering assistance (23)
- Rodney Mkhatshwa – engineering assistance (24)

== Charts ==
=== Weekly charts ===
Weekly chart performance for The Last Wun
Chart (2025–2026)	Peak position
Australian Albums (ARIA)	62
Australian Hip Hop/R&B Albums (ARIA)	9
Austrian Albums (Ö3 Austria)	18
Belgian Albums (Ultratop Flanders)	26
Belgian Albums (Ultratop Wallonia)	35
Canadian Albums (Billboard)	6
Danish Albums (Hitlisten)	23
Dutch Albums (Album Top 100)	10
French Albums (SNEP)	52
German Albums (Offizielle Top 100)	51
Irish Albums (Official Charts)	28
Lithuanian Albums (AGATA)	68
New Zealand Albums (RMNZ)	16
Nigerian Albums (TurnTable)	1
Norwegian Albums (IFPI Norge)	16
Portuguese Albums (AFP)	24
Swiss Albums (Schweizer Hitparade)	3
UK Albums (Official Charts)	9
US Billboard 200	3
US Top R&B/Hip-Hop Albums (Billboard)	1

=== Year-end charts ===
2025 year-end chart performance for The Last Wun
Chart (2025)	Position
US Billboard 200	174
US Top R&B/Hip-Hop Albums (Billboard)	49

== Certifications ==
Certifications for The Last Wun
Region	Certification	Certified units/sales
New Zealand (RMNZ)	Gold	7,500^{‡}
United Kingdom (BPI)	Gold	100,000^{‡}
^{‡} Sales+streaming figures based on certification alone.
