= One of Wun (song) =

2024 song by Gunna

Single by Gunna

from the album One of Wun
- Released: May 28, 2024
- Length: 2:24
- Label: YSL; 300
- Songwriters: Sergio Kitchens; Kenneth Redfield, Jr.; Leutrim Beqiri; Quendrim Hasani
- Producers: Kenny Stuntin; Byrd; Que

Gunna singles chronology
"Jump" (2024)	"One of Wun" (2024)	"Tiffany" (2024)

Music video
- "One of Wun" on YouTube

"One of Wun" is a song by American rapper Gunna. It was sent to US rhythmic radio through YSL Records and 300 Entertainment as the third and final single from his fifth studio album of the same name, on May 28, 2024. Gunna wrote the song with producers Kenny Stuntin, Byrd, and Que.

== Composition ==
Lyrically, the song centers around Gunna's determination to succeed in the face of adversity. In the chorus, he references the backlash against him and the people who want him to fail. Elsewhere, he also boasts his fashion, particularly about wearing the most stylish outfit at the Met Gala. Robin Murray of Clash remarked that the song "hits hard, with Gunna refusing to pull his punches. As a demonstration of rap finesse, it works as a superb portrait of his technical skills."

== Charts ==
=== Weekly charts ===
Weekly performance for "One of Wun"
Chart (2024–2025)	Peak position
Australia (ARIA)	68
Australia Hip Hop/R&B (ARIA)	10
Canada Hot 100 (Billboard)	34
Global 200 (Billboard)	51
Ireland (IRMA)	52
Lithuania (AGATA)	82
New Zealand Hot Singles (RMNZ)	9
South Africa (TOSAC)	14
Switzerland (Schweizer Hitparade)	62
UK Singles (OCC)	30
UK Hip Hop/R&B (OCC)	3
US Billboard Hot 100	26
US Hot R&B/Hip-Hop Songs (Billboard)	9
US Rhythmic Airplay (Billboard)	15

=== Year-end charts ===
Year-end chart performance for "One of Wun"
Chart (2024)	Position
Canada (Canadian Hot 100)	100
US Hot R&B/Hip-Hop Songs (Billboard)	28

== Certifications ==
Certifications for "One of Wun"
Region	Certification	Certified units/sales
Australia (ARIA)	Gold	35,000^{‡}
Canada (Music Canada)	2× Platinum	160,000^{‡}
New Zealand (RMNZ)	Platinum	30,000^{‡}
Nigeria (TCSN)	Silver	25,000^{‡}
United Kingdom (BPI)	Gold	400,000^{‡}
^{‡} Sales+streaming figures based on certification alone.
