= One of Wun =

Studio album by Gunna
- Released: May 10, 2024
- Recorded: 2023–2024
- Length: 57:08
- Labels: YSL; 300
- Producers: Aaron Bow; Andre Denim; Aviator Keyyz; Byrd; Cacija; Clarke; Don Oskar; Dunk Rock; Evince; Evrgrn; Flo; Fritz!; Gabe Lucas; Grey Toomey; Harrison Song; Hennessy; Jacobsen; Kenny Stuntin; Kizzy; Kristian Rose; Larrance Dopson; Lucas Padulo; LukasBL; Nash; Omar Grand; Que; Saint Luca; Segrate Martell Price; Sspike Trap; Teddy Walton; TheSkyeBeats; SWSHR; Turbo; Young T; 254Bodi

Gunna chronology
A Gift & a Curse (2023)	One of Wun (2024)	The Last Wun (2025)

Singles from One of Wun
- 1. "Prada Dem" Released: March 15, 2024; 2. "WhatsApp (Wassam)" Released: May 3, 2024; 3. "One of Wun" Released: May 28, 2024

One of Wun is the fifth studio album by American rapper Gunna. It was released under license to YSL Records and 300 Entertainment on May 10, 2024. The album features guest appearances from Offset, Normani, Leon Bridges, and Roddy Ricch. Production was handled by a variety of record producers, including Turbo, Teddy Walton, and Larrance Dopson, among others. It serves as the follow-up to Gunna's previous album, A Gift & a Curse (2023), in which he embarked on the Bittersweet and Wun of Dem Nights tours to support both albums. The album was supported by three singles: "Prada Dem", "WhatsApp (Wassam)", and its title track, the former of which features Offset. The album debuted at number two on Billboard 200 chart with 91,000 album-equivalent units in its first week, While it debuted at number one on the Billboard Top R&B/Hip-Hop Albums chart. It also debuted on top 50 in numerous territories as well.

== Background and promotion ==
Gunna released the lead single of the album, "Prada Dem", which features fellow American rapper Offset, on March 15, 2024. Exactly a month later, he announced the title of the album and revealed its cover art, while its release date was still unknown at the time. On May 3, 2024, he released the second single, "WhatsApp (Wassam)", and announced the release date of the album. The title track of the album was sent to US rhythmic radio as the third and final single of the album on May 28, 2024.

== Critical reception ==
Professional ratings
Review scores
Source	Rating
Clash	7/10
Pitchfork	5.7/10

Alphonse Pierre of Pitchfork wrote that the tracks on One of Wun "sound like catchy Gunna songs of the past—he's still able to float on these laid-back, skittering ATL trap variants while reading straight off his SSENSE receipt—but they don't feel like them. He's going through the motions." Demi Phillips of HotNewHipHop stated, "One of Wun is definitely evidence of Gunna's melodic prowess and his established place in the trap genre. However, while the album showcases his signature sound and lyrical themes, it also reveals areas where the artist could have stretched his creative boundaries further. The album's production is polished, with Gunna's flow as precise as ever, but it often treads familiar ground." Phillips described the production to be "not at all shoddy" and "very cohesive", before writing "However, for a 20-track album, this sometimes borders on monotonous. Unfortunately, there are moments that lead to a sense of redundancy, especially as the album progresses. The album also seems to need a more specific lyrical depth that could have provided a more explicit understanding of Gunna as an artist. Many tracks don't venture into new lyrical territory that might have offered a fresh perspective on Gunna's experiences."

== Commercial performance ==
One of Wun debuted at number two on the US Billboard 200 dated May 25, 2024, with 91,000 album-equivalent units (including 1,000 in pure album sales) in its first week. It is Gunna's sixth top ten album. The album also accumulated a total of 118.5 million on-demand streams of the album's songs.

== Track listing ==
One of Wun track listing
No.	Title	Writer(s)	Producer(s)	Length
1.	"Collage"	Sergio Kitchens; Amman Nurani; Teun Bauhuis	Evrgrn; Young T	2:27
2.	"One of Wun"	Kitchens; Kenneth Redfield, Jr.; Leutrim Beqiri; Quendrim Hasani	Kenny Stuntin; Byrd; Que	2:24
3.	"Neck on a Yacht"	Kitchens; Chandler Great	Turbo	2:35
4.	"WhatsApp (Wassam)"	Kitchens; Great; Nurani	Turbo; Evrgrn	2:28
5.	"Hakuna Matata"	Kitchens; Nurani; Redfield; Luc Randma; Adam Fritzler	Evrgrn; Kenny Stuntin; Don Oskar; Fritz!	2:07
6.	"Prada Dem" (featuring Offset)	Kitchens; Kiari Cephus; Kenneth Gilmore; Nurani; Fritzler; Florian Ongonga	Aviator Keyyz; Evrgrn; Fritz!	2:45
7.	"Treesh"	Kitchens; Nurani; Ongonga; Lucas Difabbio	Evrgrn; Flo; Dunk Rock	2:12
8.	"On One Tonight"	Kitchens; Redfield; Nathan Lamarche	Kenny Stuntin; Nash	1:30
9.	"Back in the A"	Kitchens; Travis Walton; Nurani; Lucas Padulo; Darnell Carr, Jr.; Aaron Booe; Cacija	Teddy Walton; Evrgrn; Padulo; Kizzy; Aaron Bow; Cacija	2:53
10.	"Trio"	Kitchens; Carr	Kizzy	1:56
11.	"Still Prevail"	Kitchens; Carr	Kizzy	3:12
12.	"Blackjack"	Kitchens; Larrance Dopson; Nurani; Patrick Bodi; Matthew King; William Winter; Redfield; Ongonga	Dopson; Evrgrn; 254Bodi; Clarke; Andre Denim	3:24
13.	"$$$" (featuring Normani)	Kitchens; Normani Hamilton; Jeppe Jacobsen; Redfield; Difabbio; Ongonga	Jacobsen; Kenny Stuntin; Dunk Rock	3:01
14.	"Clear My Rain" (featuring Leon Bridges)	Kitchens; Todd Bridges; Jesse Evans; Redfield	Evince; Kenny Stuntin	3:03
15.	"Conscience"	Kitchens; Nurani; Redfield; Alex Bottero	Evrgrn; Kenny Stuntin; Sspike Trap	2:23
16.	"The Time"	Kitchens; Carr; Daniel Haines	Kenny Stuntin; Hennessy	2:51
17.	"Let It Breathe" (featuring Roddy Ricch)	Kitchens; Rodrick Moore, Jr.; Harrison Song; Nurani; Redfield	Song; Evrgrn; Kenny Stuntin	3:20
18.	"Life's Changing"	Kitchens; Nurani	Evrgrn	3:09
19.	"Today I Did Good"	Kitchens; Redfield; Frederik Thrane; Anders Lunøe; Wyatt Morrison	Kenny Stuntin; Saint Luca; SWSHR; TheSkyeBeats	2:53
20.	"Time Reveals, Be Careful What You Wish For"	Kitchens; Robert Richardson; Great; Gilmore; Omar Perrin; Segrate Price; Gray Toomey; Kristian Madsen; Luka Berman; Lukas Kroll	Turbo; Aviator Keyyz; Omar Grand; Price; Kristian Rose; LukasBL; Gabe Lucas; Gray Toomey	6:35
Total length:				57:08

== Charts ==
=== Weekly charts ===
Weekly chart performance for One of Wun
Chart (2024–2025)	Peak position
Australian Albums (ARIA)	38
Australian Hip Hop/R&B Albums (ARIA)	9
Austrian Albums (Ö3 Austria)	8
Belgian Albums (Ultratop Flanders)	19
Belgian Albums (Ultratop Wallonia)	22
Canadian Albums (Billboard)	5
Danish Albums (Hitlisten)	18
Dutch Albums (Album Top 100)	7
French Albums (SNEP)	50
German Albums (Offizielle Top 100)	26
Hungarian Albums (MAHASZ)	29
Icelandic Albums (Tónlistinn)	12
Irish Albums (Official Charts)	14
Lithuanian Albums (AGATA)	35
New Zealand Albums (RMNZ)	10
Norwegian Albums (VG-lista)	12
Portuguese Albums (AFP)	20
Swiss Albums (Schweizer Hitparade)	4
UK Albums (Official Charts)	4
US Billboard 200	2
US Top R&B/Hip-Hop Albums (Billboard)	1

=== Year-end charts ===
2024 year-end chart performance for One of Wun
Chart (2024)	Position
US Billboard 200	101
US Top R&B/Hip-Hop Albums (Billboard)	36

2025 year-end chart performance for One of Wun
Chart (2025)	Position
US Billboard 200	151
US Top R&B/Hip-Hop Albums (Billboard)	45

== Certifications ==
Certifications and sales for One of Wun
Region	Certification	Certified units/sales
Canada (Music Canada)	Platinum	80,000^{‡}
New Zealand (RMNZ)	Gold	7,500^{‡}
United Kingdom (BPI)	Gold	100,000^{‡}
^{‡} Sales+streaming figures based on certification alone.
