= A Gift & a Curse =

Studio album by Gunna
- Released: June 16, 2023
- Length: 45:08
- Label: YSL; 300
- Producer: 88 Krazy; Angelo; Cam Griffin; Cubeatz; Dunk Rock; Evergreen; Flo; Fresh Ayr; Jojokelete; Kenny Stuntin; Larrance Dopson; Lnk; Mario Petersen; Nils; Omar Grand; Pooh Beatz; Rick Anthony; Royal808; Sammy Haig; Sim; Slowburnz; Swiff D; Turbo; Willis Keaton; X-Plosive; Yung Talent

Gunna chronology
DS4Ever (2022)	A Gift & a Curse (2023)	One of Wun (2024)

Singles from A Gift & a Curse
- 1. "Bread & Butter" Released: June 2, 2023; 2. "FukUMean" Released: July 11, 2023

A Gift & a Curse is the fourth studio album by American rapper Gunna. It was surprise released through YSL Records and 300 Entertainment on June 16, 2023. Production on the album was handled by Turbo, Larrance Dopson, Cubeatz, and Fresh Ayr, among others. It was supported by two singles, "Bread & Butter" and "FukUMean", and serves as the follow-up to his previous album, DS4Ever (2022).

== Critical reception ==
Professional ratings
Aggregate scores
Source	Rating
Metacritic	68/100
Review scores
Source	Rating
AllMusic	3/5 stars
Clash	7/10
Mic Cheque	7.5/10
Pitchfork	5.9/10
Slant Magazine	6/10

A Gift & a Curse received generally positive reviews. At Metacritic, which assigns a normalized rating out of 100 to reviews from professional publications, the album received an average score of 68, based on six reviews. The album was "Complex" album of the year for 2023 The album was "Complex. https://www.yearendlists.com/2023/complex-the-best-albums-of-2023 Robin Murray of Clash wrote that the album was "succinct, finessed, and packs a punch". Writing for Mic Cheque, Hamza Riaz opined that it "shows that Gunna is YSL's most valuable asset, constantly honing his sound and this time adding a new layer to his predictable output". In a mixed review, Alphonse Pierre of Pitchfork felt like the album was "too vague to have much depth and too absorbed in real-life drama to have the feel-good vibes he wants to preserve". Writing for Slant Magazine, Paul Attard felt that "Gunna gives us more of himself than he ever has before, and even if much of the lyrical substance of the album is undermined in a few weeks' time, that in and of itself is worth celebrating".

== Commercial performance ==
In the United States, A Gift & a Curse debuted at number three on Billboard 200 chart, earning 85,000 album-equivalent units (including 1,000 in pure album sales) in its first week. This became Gunna's fifth top ten album in total, with four out of the five credited to him, on the chart. The album also accumulated a total of 112.65 million on-demand streams of the album's songs.

== Track listing ==
A Gift & a Curse track listing
No.	Title	Writer(s)	Producer(s)	Length
1.	"Back at It"	Sergio Kitchens; Chandler Durham; Omar Perrin; Cameron Griffin	Turbo; Omar Grand; Cam Griffin	3:06
2.	"Back to the Moon"	Kitchens; Kenneth Redfield Jr.; Simarpreet Bahia	Kenny Stuntin; Sim	3:13
3.	"IDK NoMore"	Kitchens; Durham; Perrin; Griffin; Nils Noehden	Turbo; Omar Grand; Cam Griffin; Nils	2:59
4.	"Paybach"	Kitchens; Durham; Darryl Clemons; Leon Krol; Mario Petersen	Turbo; Pooh Beatz; Lnk; Petersen	2:53
5.	"Cash Shit"	Kitchens; Florian Ongonga; Thomas Kessler; Felix Roggenkamper	Flo; X-Plosive; Royal808	2:11
6.	"FukUMean"	Kitchens; Ongonga; Lucas DiFabbio	Flo; Dunk Rock	2:05
7.	"Rodeo Dr"	Kitchens; Ongonga; Angelo Ferraro	Flo; Angelo	2:56
8.	"Bottom"	Kitchens; Durham; Camren Martin	Turbo; Yung Talent	2:57
9.	"P Angels"	Kitchens; Willis Keaton; Nicholas Santos	Keaton; Slowburnz; 88 Krazy	2:56
10.	"Born Rich"	Kitchens; Larrance Dopson; Steven Thornton	Dopson; Swiff D	2:52
11.	"Go Crazy"	Kitchens; Redfield; Amman Nurani; Sacha Katz; William Clarke	Kenny Stuntin; Evrgrn; Zookids	2:53
12.	"Bread & Butter"	Kitchens; Durham; Perrin; Griffin	Turbo; Omar Grand; Cam Griffin	3:46
13.	"Turned Your Back"	Kitchens; Durham; Perrin; Griffin	Turbo; Omar Grand; Cam Griffin	4:03
14.	"I Was Just Thinking"	Kitchens; Kenneth Gilmore; Rick Anthony; Sammy Haig	Aviator Keyyz; Anthony; Haig	3:12
15.	"Alright"	Kitchens; Tim Gomringer; Kevin Gomringer; Jeffery Robinson; Johannes Kelete; Ongonga	Cubeatz; Fresh Ayr; Jojokelete	3:04
Total length:				45:08

== Charts ==
=== Weekly charts ===
Weekly chart performance for A Gift & a Curse
Chart (2023–2024)	Peak position
Australian Albums (ARIA)	49
Austrian Albums (Ö3 Austria)	18
Belgian Albums (Ultratop Flanders)	33
Belgian Albums (Ultratop Wallonia)	45
Canadian Albums (Billboard)	4
Dutch Albums (Album Top 100)	19
French Albums (SNEP)	43
German Albums (Offizielle Top 100)	36
Irish Albums (OCC)	33
Lithuanian Albums (AGATA)	30
New Zealand Albums (RMNZ)	12
Nigerian Albums (TurnTable)	13
Norwegian Albums (VG-lista)	20
Swiss Albums (Schweizer Hitparade)	7
UK Albums (OCC)	9
US Billboard 200	3
US Top R&B/Hip-Hop Albums (Billboard)	1

=== Year-end charts ===
2023 year-end chart performance for A Gift & a Curse
Chart (2023)	Position
US Billboard 200	74
US Top R&B/Hip-Hop Albums (Billboard)	27

2024 year-end chart performance for A Gift & a Curse
Chart (2024)	Position
US Billboard 200	176
US Top R&B/Hip-Hop Albums (Billboard)	61

== Certifications ==
Certifications for A Gift & a Curse
Region	Certification	Certified units/sales
Canada (Music Canada)	Platinum	80,000^{‡}
New Zealand (RMNZ)	Gold	7,500^{‡}
United Kingdom (BPI)	Silver	60,000^{‡}
United States (RIAA)	Platinum	1,000,000^{‡}
^{‡} Sales+streaming figures based on certification alone.
