= Gunna (rapper) =

American rapper (born 1993)

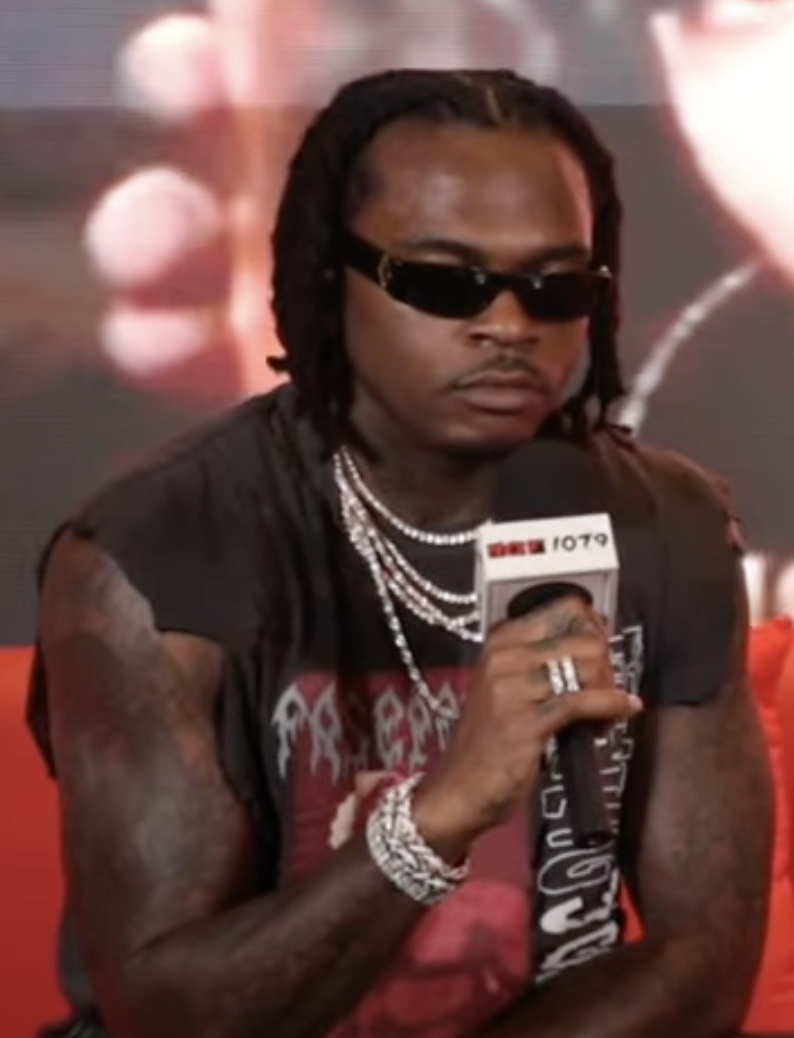
- Gunna in 2025

Background information
- Also known as: Wunna; Gunna Gunna; Gunna Wunna
- Born: Sergio Giavanni Kitchens; June 14, 1993 (age 33); College Park, Georgia, U.S.
- Genre: Hip-hop
- Occupation: Rapper • singer • songwriter • record producer
- Works: Gunna discography
- Years active: 2016–present
- Labels: SB; Atlantic; 300 Entertainment (former); YSL (former)
- Website: only1gunna.com

Sergio Giavanni Kitchens (born June 14, 1993), known professionally as Gunna, is an American rapper, singer, songwriter, and record producer. He signed with Young Thug's YSL Records, an imprint of 300 Entertainment in 2016, and rose to fame with his third mixtape, Drip Season 3 (2018). It moderately entered the Billboard 200, while his collaborative mixtape with fellow Georgia rapper Lil Baby, Drip Harder (2018), peaked at number four on the chart. Its lead single, "Drip Too Hard" peaked at number four on the Billboard Hot 100, received diamond certification by the Recording Industry Association of America (RIAA), and was nominated for Best Rap/Sung Performance at the 62nd Annual Grammy Awards.

His debut studio album, Drip or Drown 2 (2019) peaked at number three on the Billboard 200, while his second, Wunna (2020) debuted atop the chart. His 2020 single, "Lemonade" (with Internet Money and Don Toliver featuring Nav) peaked at number six on the Billboard Hot 100. His third album, DS4Ever (2022), became his second consecutive number-one album, while his fourth, A Gift & a Curse (2023) peaked at number three and spawned his second top ten single, "FukUMean". His fifth album, One of Wun (2024) peaked at number two on the Billboard 200 and was supported by the top 30 track "One of Wun". His sixth album, The Last Wun (2025) peaked at number three on the Billboard 200 and was supported by the top 50 track "Just Say Dat". The Last Wun is Gunna's last release through YSL/300.

On May 11, 2022, Gunna was arrested two days after alleged co-conspirator Young Thug in a 56-count RICO indictment against the YSL record label. On December 14, 2022, Gunna took a plea deal and was released from prison.

== Early life ==
Gunna was born on June 14, 1993, in College Park, Georgia. He was raised by his mother and has four older brothers. He started making music at age fifteen. He grew up listening to Cam'ron, Chingy and Outkast, among others. Gunna attended North Springs Charter School of Arts and Sciences, Banneker High School, Langston Hughes High School, and Creekside High School (Georgia). In 2013, Gunna released the mixtape Hard Body under the name Yung Serg.

== Career ==
=== 2016–2018: Career beginnings and Drip Season series ===
Gunna was introduced to rapper Young Thug through Keith "King" Troup, a mutual friend and community figure who died in December 2015. He was later featured alongside rappers Travis Scott and Gucci Mane on Thug's song, "Floyd Mayweather", from his commercial mixtape Jeffery.

On October 14, 2016, Gunna released his mixtape Drip Season through YSL Records. It featured members from YSL, such as Young Thug, Lil Duke, and Nechie. He released the mixtape Drip Season 2 on May 11, 2017. It featured many popular Atlanta and YSL artists such as Young Thug, Playboi Carti, and Offset. From the mixtape, "YSL", featuring Playboi Carti, was on a "Grand Theft Auto" radio station. On November 30, 2017, he released his debut extended play Drip or Drown, in which his record producer and close friend Wheezy entirely produced it, with a sole guest appearance from Young Thug.

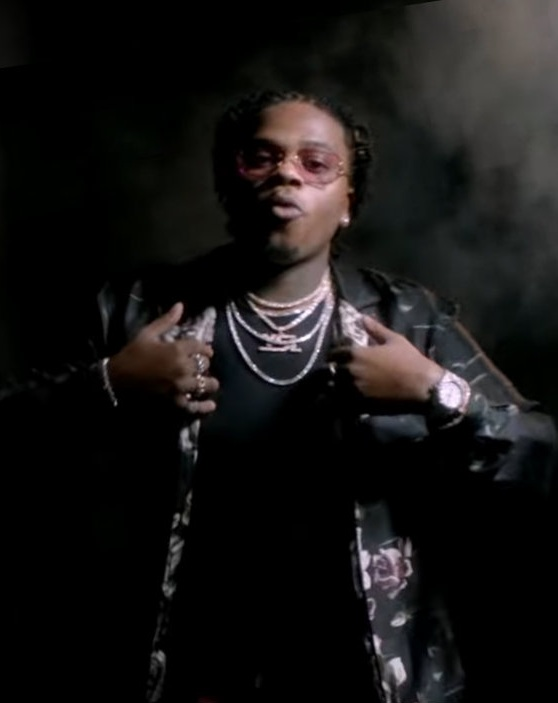
Gunna in the music video for Young Thug's song "Dirty Shoes" in 2018

On February 2, 2018, he released the commercial mixtape Drip Season 3. It featured notable guest appearances from Hoodrich Pablo Juan, Lil Durk, Nav, Metro Boomin, and Lil Yachty, while the deluxe edition featured additional appearances from Lil Uzi Vert, Young Jordan, Young Thug, and Lil Baby. The regular and deluxe editions were simultaneously released together.

On April 17, 2018, Gunna released a single titled "Sold Out Dates" featuring Lil Baby, a close friend and frequent collaborator. The song became one of his mainstream recordings and received millions of streams on platforms like YouTube and SoundCloud. It was eventually released as a non-album single after leaks. On August 3, Gunna also appeared alongside Nav on Travis Scott's single "Yosemite", a standout song from his third studio album, Astroworld, which happened to also be the highest-selling album of the year. The verse in the song, which was performed by Scott mimics Gunna's verse in "Sold Out Dates". The majority of the song's popularity went towards Gunna's appearance on the chorus.

On September 12, 2018, Gunna and Lil Baby released a collaborative single "Drip Too Hard", which would be the lead single of their collaborative mixtape Drip Harder. The single peaked at number 4 on the Billboard Hot 100. The mixtape was released on October 5. With guest appearances from Lil Durk, Nav, Young Thug, and Drake, it peaked at number 4 on the Billboard 200.

=== 2019–2022: Drip or Drown 2, Wunna, and DS4Ever ===
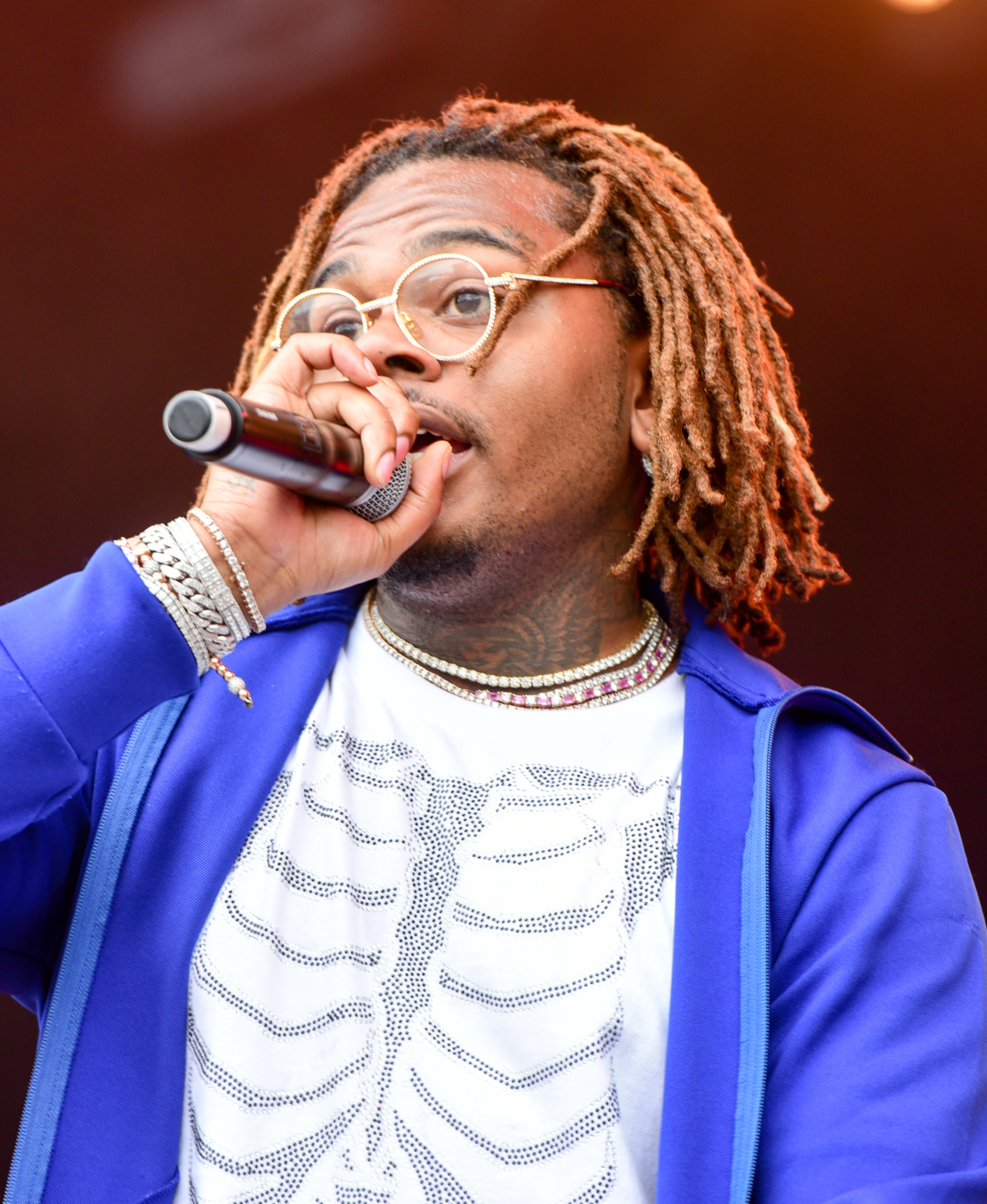
Gunna performing at the Openair Frauenfeld in 2019

On February 1, 2019, Gunna released the single "One Call", which was certified platinum and serves as the lead single of his debut studio album, Drip or Drown 2. On February 11, he released the second and final single, "Speed It Up". The album was released on February 22, featuring guest appearances from fellow Atlanta rappers Lil Baby, Young Thug, and Playboi Carti, and charted at number three on the 200 Chart.

On August 16, 2019, he was featured on Young Thug's single "Hot" from the latter's debut studio album, So Much Fun. The song peaked at the number-one spot on Apple Music. The song was given a remix with an extra feature on a verse from Travis Scott on October 31 (Halloween), because of which the song eventually peaked at number 11 on the Billboard Hot 100. Gunna is also featured on "Surf" from the album, as well as "Diamonds" from the deluxe version, the latter which was released in December 2019.

In February 2020, Gunna was featured on three songs. He appeared on Pop Smoke's "Dior" remix, released on February 12. He was also featured on Marlo's "My Hood" alongside Roddy Ricch and London on da Track on A Boogie wit da Hoodie's song "Numbers", both released on February 14. Gunna later released a collaborative single with Nav, titled "Turks", featuring Travis Scott. The song was released on March 27, 2020, and serves as the lead single to Nav's third studio album, Good Intentions (Gunna is also featured on the track "Codeine" from the album). "Turks" marks the second time the three artists had collaborated on the same song following Scott's "Yosemite". Six days later, on April 2, 2020, he released a collaborative track with producer Turbo and Young Thug, titled "Quarantine Clean", referencing the COVID-19 pandemic.

On March 6, 2020, he released "Skybox", the lead single of his second studio album, Wunna. It was released with an accompanying music video. On May 18, 2020, Gunna released the title track of the album, which was the second single. Four days later, on May 22, Gunna released the album. It features guest appearances from Young Thug, Nechie, Lil Baby, Roddy Ricch, and Travis Scott. The album debuted at number one on the Billboard 200, becoming his first number-one album. On July 24, 2020, he released the deluxe edition, with eight more songs, featuring additional guest appearances from Yak Gotti, Future, Nav, and Lil Uzi Vert.

On August 14, 2020, Gunna and hip hop collective and record label Internet Money released the single "Lemonade", featuring Don Toliver and Nav. The track would proceed to be one of the biggest hits of 2020, peaking at number six on the Billboard Hot 100, and was eventually certified 4× platinum by the RIAA.

On April 16, 2021, Gunna released a collaborative album with Young Thug and their record label Young Stoner Life titled Slime Language 2. The record featured guest appearances from Travis Scott, Drake, Rowdy Rebel, Lil Baby, Lil Uzi Vert, Coi Leray, Big Sean, Nav, Skepta, Future, YNW Melly, Yung Bleu, Sheck Wes, Kid Cudi, and Meek Mill, and debuted at number one on the Billboard 200 albums chart, moving 113,000 album-equivalent units in its first week.

On January 7, 2022, Gunna released his third studio album, DS4Ever, the fourth and final instalment in his Drip Season series. The album features guest appearances from Future, Young Thug, 21 Savage, Drake, Kodak Black, Chlöe, Lil Baby, G Herbo, Nechie, Chris Brown, Yung Bleu, and Roddy Ricch. The album debuted at number one on the Billboard 200 albums chart, moving 150,000 album-equivalent units in its first week. The album notably blocked the Weeknd's album Dawn FM from the top spot by approximately 2,300 units.

=== 2023–2025: A Gift & A Curse, One of Wun & The Last Wun ===
Five months after his release from jail, Gunna released the track "Bread & Butter", in which he speaks on his arrest and allegations that he snitched on his friend and mentor Young Thug. On his 30th birthday, Gunna announced a new album titled A Gift & a Curse, which released a day later. The album debuted at number three on the Billboard 200 chart, earning 85,000 album-equivalent units (including 1,000 in pure album sales) in its first week. The album's second single, "FukUMean" was released on July 11, 2023, after being submitted to rhythmic contemporary radio. The song proved to be a mega-hit and would prove to be Gunna's second most successful song on the Billboard Hot 100, behind "Drip too Hard". The track spent thirty-two weeks on the chart, peaking at number four. "FukUMean" also reached the top ten in ten different countries.

Following the release of the song "Prada Dem", featuring Offset, Gunna announced the title of his fifth studio album in April, 2024. On May 3, 2024, he released another single "WhatsApp (Wassam)", serving as the second single off of his forthcoming album, One of Wun. On the same day, Gunna announced that One of Wun would be releasing on May 10, 2024. The album features guest appearances from Offset, Normani, Leon Bridges, and Roddy Ricch and debuted at number two on the US Billboard 200. On May 14, 2024, Gunna was featured alongside Jamaican rapper Skillibeng on the song "Jump" off of South African singer Tyla's debut album. The song was accompanied by a music video which was filmed in Hillbrow, Johannesburg, and Kliptown, Soweto.

In June 2025, Gunna announced his next album, The Last Wun, his final album with YSL Records. The album released on August 8, 2025.

=== 2026-present: Splurge ===
In October 2026, Gunna announced the formation of SB The Label, an imprint of Atlantic Records. Signees to the label include Casper Bluff, Dracc, and Nechie. He released the song "Pop It" as the lead single for his studio album Splurge on October 9, 2026.

== Philanthropy ==
In February 2022, Gunna teamed up with sustainable food waste management and hunger relief company Goodr to open a free grocery store at Ronald E. McNair Middle School, which he attended as a teenager.

== Legal issues ==
In May 2022, Gunna and Young Thug were among 28 persons associated with YSL Records who were charged in a 56-count RICO Act indictment filed by Fulton County District Attorney Fani Willis. On May 11, 2022, Kitchens turned himself in to authorities. Kitchens was denied bond, and his trial was scheduled to begin January 9, 2023. On October 13, 2022, Kitchens was again denied release from jail ahead of his January trial. On December 14, 2022, Kitchens pleaded guilty to a single charge of racketeering and was sentenced to five years in prison, with one year commuted to time served and the rest of the sentence suspended subject to probation conditions, including 500 hours of community service; he was released from jail the same day.

== Discography ==
Studio albums

- Drip or Drown 2 (2019)
- Wunna (2020)
- DS4Ever (2022)
- A Gift & a Curse (2023)
- One of Wun (2024)
- The Last Wun (2025)

== Concert tours ==
=== Headlining ===
- Drip or Drown 2 Tour (2019)
- Bittersweet Tour (2024)
- Wun Of Dem Nights Tour (2024)
- Wun World Tour (2025)

=== Supporting Act ===
- Astroworld – Wish You Were Here Tour (with Travis Scott) (2018)

== Awards and nominations ==
Award	Year	Nominee	Category	Result	Ref.
Grammy Awards	2020	"Drip Too Hard" (with Lil Baby)	Best Rap/Sung Performance	Nominated	
Grammy Awards	2022	Doja Cat - Planet Her (Deluxe) (as featured artist)	Album of the Year	Nominated	
Grammy Awards	2023	"Pushin P" (with Future featuring Young Thug)	Best Rap Performance	Nominated	
Grammy Awards	2023	"Pushin P" (with Future featuring Young Thug)	Best Rap Song	Nominated	
