= Wunna =

Wunna may refer to:

- Maung Wunna (1945–2011), Burmese filmmaker
- Wunna Maung Lwin (born 1952), Burmese politician
- Gunna (rapper), also known as Wunna
  - Wunna (album), a 2020 album by Gunna
  - "Wunna" (song), a song from the album
- Wunna Dam and Wunna river, near Nagpur, Maharashtra, India

== See also ==
- Wuna (disambiguation)
