= American Trucker =

American television series

- Genre: Documentary; Reality
- Directed by: List: Steve Mitchell Beebe; Andrew Robinson; Dennis Zerull
- Starring: Robb Mariani
- Composer: Jeremy Sweet
- Country of origin: United States
- Original language: English
- No. of seasons: 2
- No. of episodes: 28

Production
- Producers: List: Bud Brutsman; Ashley Yoder; Dennis Zerull; Steve Schleinitz
- Cinematography: Tim Fenoglio
- Editors: List: Tim Furrow; Dennis Harold
- Camera setup: David C. Smith
- Production company: Brentwood Communications International

Original release
- Network: Speed
- Release: February 21 – November 10, 2011

American Trucker is a television show on the Speed cable channel. Hosted by Robb Mariani, the pilot episode featured him helping another mechanic restore a 1980 Kenworth K-100 Aerodyne trucks, which was used in the television series B. J. and the Bear, along with a short piece about the world's largest truck stop, the Iowa 80.

American Trucker ran a total of twenty-eight episodes across two seasons.

The show was produced by Bud Brutsman, and directed in part by Steve Beebe of the show Overhaulin'. The content of the program was derived from Mariani's background with trucks and trucking history. Dan Bruno, the owner of the Rubber Duck's Mack truck from Convoy and past owner of the Peterbilt tanker from Duel is credited on the show as a technical consultant.
