= The Navy Album =

Studio album by Roddy Ricch

Studio album by Roddy Ricch
- Labels: Bird Vision; Atlantic
- Producers: Omar Grand; Terrace Martin; Turbo

Roddy Ricch chronology
Feed Tha Streets III (2022)	The Navy Album (2026)

Singles from The Navy Album
- 1. "Survivor's Remorse" Released: May 31, 2024; 2. "Lonely Road" Released: December 6, 2024

The Navy Album is the upcoming third studio album by American rapper Roddy Ricch. It is set to be released through Atlantic Records and Bird Vision Entertainment. The album will feature a guest appearance from Terrace Martin. Production was handled by Martin himself, Turbo, Omar Grand, and Evrgrn, among others. It was supported by two singles, "Survivor's Remorse" and "Lonely Road", the latter of which features Martin.

== Background and promotion ==
On February 1, 2024, American record producer Turbo was interviewed on Bootleg Kev, in which he briefly detailed how he was working with Roddy Ricch on the latter's next album. Ricch revealed the title of the album in May 2024. He released its lead single, "Survivor's Remorse", on May 31. A music video for the single, which contains heavy religious iconography and shows Ricch building a home for the mother of his child was released on the same day. On June 27, 2024, he released the single "911", which is not set to be featured on the album. On October 29, he announced that the album would release on December 6, 2024. On the initially announced album release date, Ricch shared that the album was delayed to February 21, 2025 and released the second single, "Lonely Road", which features a saxophone performance from American musician Terrace Martin. A music video, which features Ricch driving in Los Angeles in a Maybach accompanied by "guardian angels" and Martin playing the saxophone atop the Sixth Street Bridge, was also released on December 6, 2024.

== Delays ==
On February 18, 2025, three days before the album's scheduled release, the album was pushed back to April 25. On April 9, the album was delayed again, now scheduled for a release on July 18. In early July, the album was delayed to October 24. The same day the album was set for release, on October 24, the album was pushed back to December 5. The day before the scheduled release, pre-save pages for the album on Apple Music were removed without a statement.

== Track listing ==
The Navy Album track listing
No.	Title	Writer(s)	Producer(s)	Length
16.	"Survivor's Remorse"	Moore; Chandler Great; Omar Perrin; Kelly Clarkson; Taylor Rutherford; Josh Ronen	Terrace Martin; Turbo; Omar Grand	2:37
17.	"Lonely Road" (featuring Terrace Martin)	Moore; Great; Amman Nurani	Martin; Turbo; Evrgrn^{[a]}	3:20

=== Notes ===
- ^{^[a]} signifies an additional producer
- "Survivor's Remorse" contains an interpolation of "Me", written by Kelly Clarkson, Taylor Rutherford and Josh Ronen, and performed by Clarkson.
