= K. D. Aubert =

American actress and model

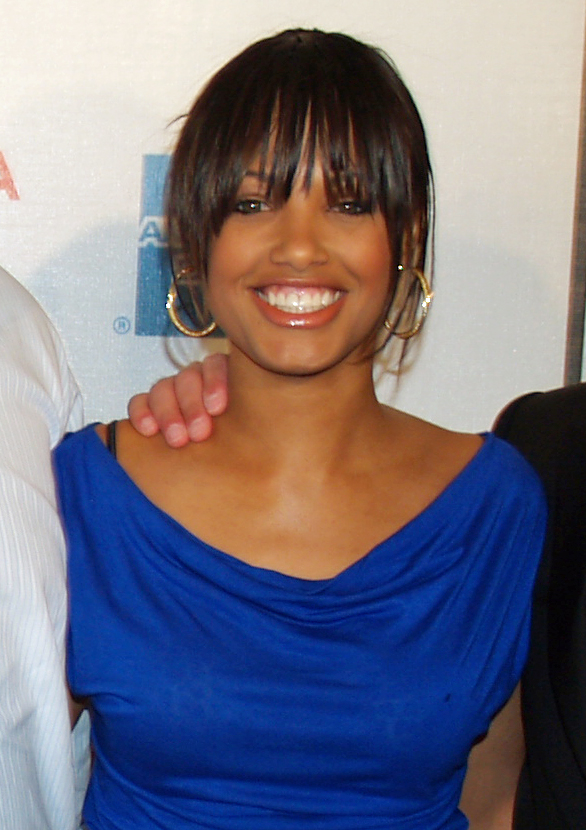
- Aubert in 2007
- Born: Karen Denise Aubert; December 6, 1978 (age 47); Shreveport, Louisiana, U.S.
- Other name: K.D. Rose
- Occupations: Actress, fashion model
- Years active: 1999–present

Karen Denise Aubert (born December 6, 1978), also known as K. D. Aubert, is an American actress and fashion model. She owns her own record label, Roseland.

== Early life ==
Aubert was born in Shreveport, Louisiana on December 6, 1978. The K.D. initials stand for Karen Denise. She describes herself as "African-American with a dash of Creole". She grew up in Riverside and Los Angeles. She attended San Diego State University, where she played on the Aztec softball team.

== Career ==
She was discovered working behind the make-up counter at Macy's. She has modeled for Victoria's Secret, Noxzema, Frederick's of Hollywood, Escada and many more. She co-hosted MTV's Kidnapped and has gone on to star in several films and music videos.

Aubert is also one of the four original Fantanas, a female group of spokesmodels appearing in TV commercials for the soft drink Fanta. She was the Strawberry Fanta. She is featured as the Strawberry Fantana with her fellow Fantanas in the Maxim magazine online girl gallery and was ranked #91 and #97 on the Maxim Hot 100 Women of 2003, and 2004. Aubert was in an Old Spice commercial with Greg Jennings of the Green Bay Packers. She has also been in commercials for Bacardi, Miller Lite, Go Daddy, Beats By Dr. Dre, and Cola. Karen has just finished a commercial with George Clooney and Nespresso.

Aubert's big break came when she was cast as Donna in Friday After Next which was directed by Marcus Raboy and produced by Ice Cube. She also had two roles in Hollywood Homicide. She also starred in DysEnchanted as Little Red Riding Hood with Jim Belushi. She played Giselle in Soul Plane. She also played Eliza in Frankenfish. In 2005, Aubert played Cherise in In the Mix. In 2007, Aubert was cast as Julie the Waitress in The Grand. In 2008, Aubert played April May in Surfer, Dude. In 2013, Aubert was nominated and won an Africa Movie Academy Award for her role in Turning Point, as well as the Turning Point cast, who also won several awards at the 9th Africa Movie Academy Awards AMAA. In 2018, Aubert was cast in a film called She Ball, directed by Nick Cannon.

== Filmography ==
=== Film ===
Year	Title	Role	Notes
2002	The Scorpion King	Harlot	
2002	Friday After Next	Donna	
2003	Hollywood Homicide	Shauntelle / Streetcar Blanche	
2004	DysEnchanted	Little Red Riding Hood	Short
2004	Soul Plane	Giselle	
2004	Frankenfish	Eliza "Liza" Crankton	TV movie
2005	In the Mix	Cherise	
2007	The Grand	Julie the Waitress	
2008	Surfer, Dude	April May	
2009	Still Waiting...	Trina	Video
2012	In Sickness and in Health	Tangie	TV movie
2012	Turning Point	Stacey	
2012	Silent No More	Vivica	
2013	Between Sisters	Aneesa	TV movie
2013	My Sister's Wedding	Sharon	
2014	Percentage	Jackie	
2014	Lap Dance	Jade Lee	
2015	What Now	Katrina	
2016	My B.F.F.	Dr. Boudreaux	
2017	2016	Eve	
2018	It's a Date	London Greer	
2020	The Perfect Mate	Cherish Adams	
2020	She Ball	Makeda	
2023	Sisters	Tara	
2023	A Sir Charles Christmas	Chante	
2023	Momma Said Come Home for Christmas	Leticia	
2023	Bomb Pizza	Rashonda	
2023	Born 2 Hustle	Damaria aka Fence	

=== Television ===
Year	Title	Role	Notes
2002	Kidnapped	Herself/Co-Host	Main Co-Host
2003	Buffy the Vampire Slayer	Nikki Wood	Recurring Cast: Season 7
2005	Bones	Toni	Episode: "The Man in the Bear"
2006	Inked	Herself	Episode: "Crossing the Line"
2008	CSI: NY	Maude	Episode: "You Only Die Once"
2011	Entourage	Vince Ex	Episode: "Second to Last"
2014	Franklin & Bash	Model	Episode: "Love Is the Drug"
2014	Married for Real?!	Zoey	Episode: "The Issue"
2015	Key & Peele	Passed Out Woman	Episode: "The End"
2016	Uncle Buck	Sorority Sister	Episode: "Brothers"
2017	Too Close to Home	Tina	Episode: "Blurred Lines"
2018	Rich Africans	Michelle	Main Cast
2018	Ladies of the Law	Trixie	Main Cast

=== Music Videos ===
Year	Song title	Artist
1999	"You"	Jesse Powell
1999	"What'chu Like"	Da Brat featuring Tyrese
2002	"Trade it All Part II"	Fabolous featuring P. Diddy
2003	"Into You"	Fabolous featuring Tamia
2003	"Your Pop's Don't Like Me"	Nick Cannon
2004	"Number One"	John Legend featuring Kanye West
2004	"Karma"	Lloyd Banks featuring Avant
2005	"Number One Spot"	Ludacris
2006	"I Don't Like the Look of It"	Da Backwudz
2007	"Ridin'"	Belly featuring Mario Winans
2008	"She Got Her Own"	Ne-Yo featuring Jamie Foxx & Fabolous
2008	"Got it For Me"	Slique
2010	"Lay It Down"	Lloyd
2010	"Down On Me"	Jeremih featuring 50 Cent
2024	"Bachelor"	Turbo & Gunna

=== Video game appearances ===
Year	Title	Role	Notes
2007	Def Jam Icon	Platinum	Voice role and likeness
