= Him All Along =

2024 single by Gunna

Single by Gunna

from the album The Last Wun
- Released: October 18, 2024
- Genre: Hip-hop
- Length: 2:38
- Label: YSL; 300
- Songwriters: Sergio Kitchens; Chandler Great; Jeremy Biddle
- Producers: Turbo; Yung Bleu

Gunna singles chronology
"Baby I'm Back" (remix) (2024)	"Him All Along" (2024)	"Got Damn" (2024)

Music video
- "Him All Along" on YouTube

"Him All Along" is a song by American rapper Gunna. It was released through YSL Records and 300 Entertainment on October 18, 2024, as the lead single from his sixth studio album, The Last Wun (2025). Gunna wrote the song with producers Turbo and Yung Bleu.

== Composition ==
The song has a mid-tempo and relaxed beat. Lyrically, Gunna boasts his wealthy lifestyle, including his imported foreign car and clothes, and his overall success, such as reaching his goals, supporting his team, and selling out shows at both Barclays Center and Madison Square Garden.

== Critical reception ==
Elaina Bernstein of Hypebeast remarked the song proves Gunna and Turbo "to be one of the most locked in rapper-production duos in the current hip-hop space." Shawn Grant of The Source wrote the song "highlights Gunna's evolving signature style, with introspective verses that lead into a powerful, emotionally charged refrain. Blending uplifting energy with stark reflection, the single showcases Gunna at his most thoughtful and poignant."

HotNewHipHop ranked the song as the 12th best rap song of 2025.

== Music video ==
An official music video premiered on November 12, 2024. Directed by Spike Jordan, it sees Gunna on vacation with Turbo in Spain, where they play golf and cruise in a golf cart. He also goes horseback riding at a racetrack in a barn, drives in his Porsche, and later stops by the Atlanta restaurant American Deli. The rest of the clip features scenes of his Family Fall Fest event and Gunna's Great Giveaway, where he donates to the Atlanta community, additionally showing carnival games and an inflatable slide. At the end of the video, Gunna boards a private jet at the Van Nuys Airport and a snippet of his song "Got Damn" is previewed.

== Charts ==
=== Weekly charts ===
Weekly chart performance for "Him All Along"
Chart (2024)	Peak position
Canada Hot 100 (Billboard)	94
New Zealand Hot Singles (RMNZ)	16
US Billboard Hot 100	58
US Hot R&B/Hip-Hop Songs (Billboard)	15

=== Year-end charts ===
Year-end chart performance for "Him All Along"
Chart (2025)	Position
US Hot R&B/Hip-Hop Songs (Billboard)	54
