= Survivor's Remorse (song) =

2024 single by Roddy Ricch

Single by Roddy Ricch

from the album The Navy Album
- Released: May 31, 2024
- Length: 2:36
- Label: Atlantic; Bird Vision
- Songwriters: Rodrick Moore, Jr.; Chandler Great; Omar Perrin; Kelly Clarkson; Taylor Rutherford; Josh Ronen
- Producers: Terrace Martin; Turbo; Omar Grand

Roddy Ricch singles chronology
"Is It Real?" (2023)	"Survivor's Remorse" (2024)

Music video
- "Survivor's Remorse" on YouTube

"Survivor's Remorse" is a song by American rapper Roddy Ricch. It was released through Atlantic Records and Bird Vision on May 31, 2024, as the lead single from his upcoming third studio album, The Navy Album The song serves as his first solo single in more than a year. Ricch wrote the song with producers Turbo and Omar Grand; Kelly Clarkson, Gayle and Josh Ronen are additionally credited due to an interpolation of the former's song, "Me". It was produced by Terrace Martin, along with Turbo and Grand. Upon its release, the single charted at number 33 on the US Billboard Hot R&B/Hip-Hop Songs chart and peaked at number 3 on Billboard's Bubbling Under Hot 100 chart. It also charted at number 81 on the TurnTable Top 100 Songs chart in Nigeria.

== Background ==
On February 1, 2024, Turbo, Roddy Ricch's long-time producer, gave an interview on the Bootleg Kev show, titled "Turbo on Staying Loyal to Gunna, Roddy Ricch's New Album, Diamond Record, & 'Turbo Day" During the interview, Turbo discussed his close working relationship with Roddy Ricch, highlighting their collaborative history and mutual respect. Turbo emphasized his loyalty to both Gunna and Roddy Ricch, elaborating on the importance of maintaining strong professional bonds in the music industry. He also shared insights into the making of Roddy's upcoming album.

== Composition and lyrics ==
Musically, "Survivor’s Remorse" is a blend of hip hop and trap, showcasing Roddy Ricch's signature melodic rap style. The production, handled by Terrace Martin, Turbo and Omar Grand, features a rich, atmospheric beat that includes layered synths, heavy bass, and sharp trap drums. The song samples "Me" (2023) by Kelly Clarkson adding a pop-infused element to the track. The production also incorporates a powerful choir bridge, creating a dynamic and emotionally charged listening experience.

Lyrically, "Survivor's Remorse" delves into Roddy Ricch's personal journey, reflecting on his rise to fame and the challenges he faced along the way. In the first verse, Ricch addresses his early struggles and the pressures that came with success

== Release and promotion ==
On May 31, 2024, Roddy Ricch announced "Survivor's Remorse" through his Instagram account. He revealed the cover art, which features him standing in a blue room wearing a white tank top and black wide-leg pants. The song will be the first taste of his upcoming album, The Navy Album, expected to be released later this year. His last full-length release was 2022's Feed Tha Streets III. Roddy teased his new era with another Instagram post captioned, "2024 is personal not business."

== Charts ==
Chart performance for "Survivor's Remorse"
Chart (2024)	Peak position
Nigeria (TurnTable Top 100)	81
US Bubbling Under Hot 100 (Billboard)	4
US Hot R&B/Hip-Hop Songs (Billboard)	33
