= Drip or Drown 2 =

Studio album by Gunna
- Released: February 22, 2019
- Genre: Hip-hop; trap
- Length: 48:06
- Label: YSL; 300
- Producer: Ghetto Guitar; Jet; Keyyz; Morgan Matthews; Tba; Turbo; Wheezy

Gunna chronology
Drip Harder (2018)	Drip or Drown 2 (2019)	Wunna (2020)

Singles from Drip or Drown 2
- 1. "One Call" Released: February 1, 2019; 2. "Speed It Up" Released: February 11, 2019

Drip or Drown 2 is the debut studio album by American rapper Gunna, released on February 22, 2019, by YSL Records and 300 Entertainment. It serves as the sequel to his 2017 EP Drip or Drown with American producer Wheezy. The album features guest appearances from Lil Baby, Young Thug, and Playboi Carti. It also features production by Wheezy and Turbo, among others.

== Singles ==
The album's first single, "One Call", was released on February 1, 2019, as well an accompanying music video. The single peaked at number 56 on the US Billboard Hot 100.

The album's second single, "Speed It Up", was released on February 11, 2019. The single peaked at number 91 on the Billboard Hot 100.

== Critical reception ==
Professional ratings
Aggregate scores
Source	Rating
Metacritic	76/100
Review scores
Source	Rating
Exclaim!	8/10
The Guardian	4/5 stars
Highsnobiety	3.0/5
HipHopDX	3.9/5
HotNewHipHop	72%
Pitchfork	6.7/10

Drip or Drown 2 was met with generally positive reviews. At Metacritic, which assigns a normalized rating out of 100 to reviews from professional publications, the album received an average score of 76, based on six reviews.

Riley Wallace of Exclaim! gave a positive review, stating, "Ultimately, Gunna sticks to his guns and delivers a solid effort that lives up to all the hype. He may not be the most innovative MC, but he continues to craft great bodies of work, which is what will cement his career, at the end of the day". Ben Beaumont-Thomas of The Guardian said, "The result is a gentle, poised record: the perfect rap album for a bruised America". Jon Caramanica from The New York Times enjoyed the album, saying, "Gunna has a penchant for rapping over beats that include guitar, like on "Richard Millie Plain", but he doesn't use them for rock scabrousness. Instead, they're caressing, soft-edged beds, elegant accompaniment for a rapper who makes his points with textures more than words. That said, there is a tenderness that peeks through here, not just in the gentleness of the sing-rapping, but also in some of the lyrics". HipHopDX critic Scott Glaysher said, "This album is a big win for Gunna, an even bigger win for executive producers Wheezy and Turbo but a championship win for contemporary rap as a whole that should be appreciated by all".

Sheldon Pearce of Pitchfork wrote, "His bars vary from the goofy ("She made me bust a nut, that's a starburst") to the confusingly profound ("Time is poured on me when I ride that Maybach"), but it's his ability to apply his signature inflection to just about any rhythm he conjures up that can make Drip or Drown 2 nearly hypnotizing". In a mixed review, Highsnobiety critic Mike Vinti wrote the following: "Though it sags in places with materialism and Gunna's melancholy flow, at its best, his charm shines through. Stronger than any of his mixtapes or EPs, Drip or Drown 2 is a promising debut album filled with hints of talent yet to be fully realized on record."

== Commercial performance ==
Drip or Drown 2 debuted at number three on the US Billboard 200 with 90,000 album-equivalent units (including 7,000 in pure album sales) in its first week. This became Gunna's second US top ten debut. In its second week, the album dropped to number eight on the chart, earning an additional 42,000 units that week. In its third week, the album remained at number eight on the chart, earning another 31,000 units that week. In its fourth week, the album dropped to number 10 on the chart, earning 27,000 units, bringing its four-week total to 190,000 units. On November 13, 2019, the album was certified gold by the Recording Industry Association of America (RIAA), for combined sales and album-equivalent units of 500,000 total units. By May 2019, it had sold 10,000 copies in pure album sales in the United States.

== Track listing ==
Drip or Drown 2 track listing
No.	Title	Writer(s)	Producer(s)	Length
1.	"Wit It"	Sergio Kitchens; Wesley Glass	Wheezy	2:19
2.	"Outstanding"	Kitchens; Chandler Durham; Matthew Charles	Turbo; Ghetto Guitar	3:00
3.	"One Call"	Kitchens; Charles; Durham; Wesley Jones	Turbo; Jet	3:16
4.	"Cash War"	Kitchens; Glass	Wheezy	3:15
5.	"Richard Millie Plain"	Kitchens; Durham; Charles	Turbo; Ghetto Guitar	3:20
6.	"Yao Ming"	Kitchens; Glass; Durham	Wheezy; Turbo	2:29
7.	"Idk Why"	Kitchens; Glass	Wheezy	3:19
8.	"Derek Fisher" (featuring Lil Baby)	Kitchens; Dominique Jones; Durham; Jaterrian Hudson	Turbo; Trell Got Wings^{[a]}	3:09
9.	"Baby Birkin"	Kitchens; Glass	Wheezy; B-Rackz^{[a]}	3:01
10.	"Speed It Up"	Kitchens; Durham	Turbo	2:59
11.	"3 Headed Snake" (featuring Young Thug)	Kitchens; Jeffery Williams; Glass; Durham	Wheezy; Turbo	4:01
12.	"Big Shot"	Kitchens; Durham; Charles	Turbo; Ghetto Guitar	2:57
13.	"On a Mountain"	Kitchens; Durham	Turbo; Tba	2:55
14.	"Out the Hood"	Kitchens; Durham; Keyshawn Gilmore; Morgan Matthews	Turbo; Keyyz; Matthews	2:35
15.	"Same Yung Nigga" (featuring Playboi Carti)	Kitchens; Jordan Carter; Durham; Glass	Turbo; Wheezy	3:00
16.	"Who You Foolin"	Kitchens; Glass	Wheezy	2:31
Total length:				48:06

Notes

- ^{^[a]} signifies an uncredited co-producer

== Personnel ==
Credits adapted from Tidal.

Performers

- Gunna – primary artist
- Lil Baby – featured artist (track 8)
- Young Thug – featured artist (track 11)
- Playboi Carti – featured artist (track 15)

Technical

- Turbo – engineer (tracks 1–9, 12–16), mixer (track 15)
- Arin "DJ AJ" Fields – engineer (track 10)
- Fabian Maraciullo – mixer (tracks 1–10, 12–14, 16)
- Alex Tumay – mixer (track 11)
- Bainzz – engineer (track 11)
- Nia "Ivy" Mills – assistant engineer (tracks 1–10, 12–14, 16)
- Colin Leonard – mastering engineer (all tracks)

Miscellaneous

- Young Thug – executive producer
- Turbo – executive producer
- Wheezy – executive producer

== Charts ==
=== Weekly charts ===
Chart performance for Drip or Drown 2
Chart (2019)	Peak position
Austrian Albums (Ö3 Austria)	74
Belgian Albums (Ultratop Flanders)	45
Belgian Albums (Ultratop Wallonia)	131
Canadian Albums (Billboard)	5
Dutch Albums (Album Top 100)	19
French Albums (SNEP)	79
Irish Albums (IRMA)	63
Lithuanian Albums (AGATA)	53
New Zealand Albums (RMNZ)	35
Swiss Albums (Schweizer Hitparade)	32
UK Albums (OCC)	24
US Billboard 200	3
US Top R&B/Hip-Hop Albums (Billboard)	1

=== Year-end charts ===
2019 year-end chart performance for Drip or Drown 2
Chart (2019)	Position
US Billboard 200	54
US Top R&B/Hip-Hop Albums (Billboard)	25

== Certifications ==
Certifications for Drip or Drown 2
Region	Certification	Certified units/sales
United States (RIAA)	Platinum	1,000,000^{‡}
^{‡} Sales+streaming figures based on certification alone.
