= Wunna (song) =

Single by Gunna

Single by Gunna

from the album Wunna
- Released: May 18, 2020
- Length: 2:38
- Label: YSL; 300
- Songwriter: Sergio Kitchens
- Producer: Turbo

Gunna singles chronology
"Quarantine Clean" (2020)	"Wunna" (2020)	"Fox 5" (2020)

Music video
- "Wunna" on YouTube

"Wunna" (stylized in all caps) is a song by American rapper Gunna, released on May 18, 2020 as the second single from his second studio album of the same name (2020). Produced by Turbo, the song interpolates "Surf" by Young Thug featuring Gunna and samples "Speed It Up" by Gunna.

== Charts ==
Chart (2020)	Peak position
Canada Hot 100 (Billboard)	79
US Billboard Hot 100	57
US Hot R&B/Hip-Hop Songs (Billboard)	24

== Certifications ==
Region	Certification	Certified units/sales
Canada (Music Canada)	Gold	40,000^{‡}
United States (RIAA)	Gold	500,000^{‡}
^{‡} Sales+streaming figures based on certification alone.
