= She Ball =

- Poster
- Directed by: Nick Cannon
- Written by: Nick Cannon
- Starring: Nick Cannon
- Release dates: August 2020 (American Black Film Festival); August 6, 2021
- Running time: 97 minutes
- Country: United States
- Language: English

She Ball is a 2020 American sports comedy drama film written and directed by Nick Cannon and starring Cannon, Birdman, Chris Brown, Cedric the Entertainer, D.C. Young Fly, Evan Ross, Faizon Love, Luenell, K. D. Aubert, Marla Gibbs, Melody Rae and Jaliyah Manuel.

== Cast ==
- Nick Cannon as Avery Watts
- Melody Rae as Shelby Van Der Gunn
- Chris Brown as T.A.K.O.
- Rosa Acosta as Lupe
- K. D. Aubert as Makeda
- Delpha Baxter as Basketball Finals Announcer
- Evan Ross as Michael
- Cedric the Entertainer as Councilmen
- D.C. Young Fly as Down South
- Birdman as Buck Star
- Faizon Love as Big Meat Tuna
- Luenell as Mrs. Mack
- Jaliyah Manuel as Magic
- Marla Gibbs as Mrs. Watts

== Release ==
She Ball premiered at the 2020 American Black Film Festival. The film was released in theaters and on demand on August 6, 2021.

== Reception ==
Monique Jones of Common Sense Media awarded the film 1 star out of 5.

Dwight Brown of the National Newspaper Publishers Association awarded the film one and a half stars.
