= Adrienne Janic =

American actress

Adrienne "AJ" Janic
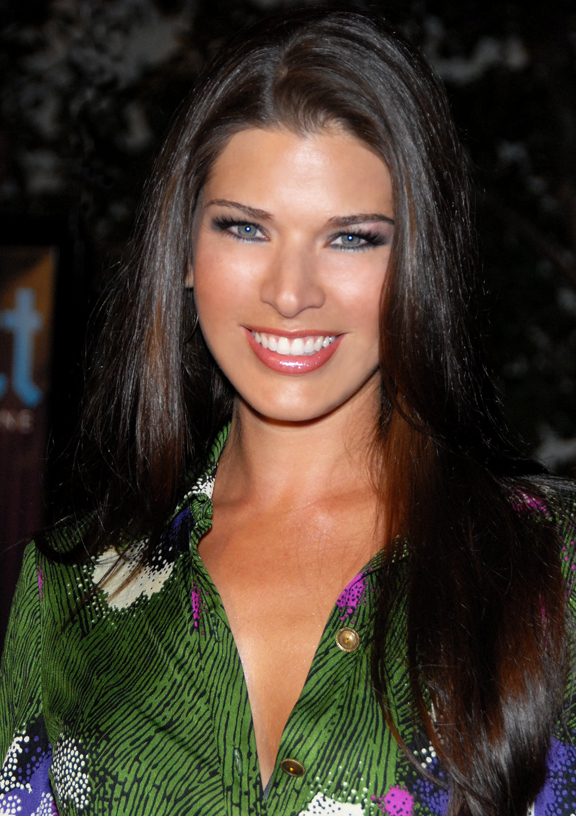
- Janic attending LA. Direct magazine's holiday party at the club Les Deux in Hollywood, California (December 11, 2008)
- Born: Whittier, California, United States
- Other name: AJ
- Spouse: Bud Brutsman
- Website: www.adriennejanic.com

Adrienne Janic (Serbian Cyrillic: Адриана Јанић, romanized: Adriana Janić) sometimes credited simply as AJ, is an American actress and television host.

== Career and life ==
She has primarily worked as a television host including as a co-host of TLC's Overhaulin', an automotive, reality-television series. She was also a host of Hot Import Nights (2008), an automotive show on the Speed Channel. On 12 September 2015, it was announced that she and Mike Phillips of Autogeek will host a new Velocity TV show Competition Ready.

She has appeared in several films including appearing in a supporting role in the film National Lampoon's Cattle Call (2006). From 2004 to 2006, Janic was one of the Fantanas, a group of promotional models that was created to promote Fanta brand of soft drinks in the U.S. In 2009 she was a co-hostess, with Tinker Keck (as Ty 'Tinker' Keck), of an infomercial for the "AbRocket" Fat Blasting System.

Janic is of Serbian and Mexican descent. She is married to Bud Brutsman, a video producer and television producer.

== Filmography ==
=== Film ===
Year	Title	Role	Notes
2001	Diary of a Sex Addict	Julie	Video
2003	N.B.T.	Ashley	
2005	Choker	Gorgeous Brunette	
2006	All In	Jillian Rose	
2006	Cattle Call	Auditioner #5	
2008	Stiletto	Large Bills Model #1	
2019	Light Visions	Zaphara	Pre-production

=== Television ===
Year	Title	Role	Notes
1998	The Secret Diary of Desmond Pfeiffer	Miss Klepp	Episode: "Once Upon a Mistress"
2000	Angel	Attractive Girl	Episode: "Five by Five"
2001	Undressed	Lauren	Regular role (season 5)
2003	Oliver Beene	Suzy	Episode: "Nudie Mag"
2004	Complete Savages	Tia	Episode: "Savage XXX-mas"
2005	House	Dr. Vivian	Episode: "Acceptance"
2006	Kitchen Confidential	Beautiful Woman #2	Episode: "Praise Be Praise"
2007	Las Vegas	Roxanne	Episode: "The Glass Is Always Cleaner"
2019	SEMA: Battle of the Builders	Adrienne	TV film

== Appearances as self ==
Year	Title	Notes
2002	The Jamie Kennedy Experiment	Episode: "1.13"
2005	Queer Edge with Jack E. Jett	Episode: "1.22"
2005–08, 2014–15, 2019–	Overhaulin'	
2008	Hot Import Nights	TV series
2011–2015	The Real Housewives of Beverly Hills	14 episodes
2012	Home & Family	Episode: "9 November 2012"
2013	Actors Entertainment	Episode: "ActorsE Chat with Adrienne Janic and Ric Drasin"
2014	Fit, Famous & Fabulous	TV series
2014	Q N' A with Mikki and Shay	Episode: "Adrienne Janic Interview: 2014 Roger Neal Oscar Suite"
2014	Kendra on Top	Episode: "Girls' Night Bout"
2016–17	Competition Ready	16 episodes
