= Bud Brutsman =

American television producer

Bud W. Brutsman (born May 6, 1970) is a television show creator, executive producer, and the President of Brentwood Communications International. His best known productions include Overhaulin' and Rides for the Learning Channel (TLC), and Living with Ed for Planet Green. Brutsman was also one of the creators of King of the Cage, garnering attention on Pay-Per-View and worldwide video sales. As of 2011, Brutsman is involved in the mixed martial arts organization, Shark Fights.

== Professional background ==
Brutsman's first project was producing a country line dancing video in conjunction with Denim and Diamonds, a country dance club in Los Angeles and Dallas. He successfully sold the distribution rights of the video to a company in California and began creating television shows. In 1997, Brutsman established an independent television production company, which he named Brentwood Communications International, Inc. (BCII).

Military genre

Brutsman has produced several shows focusing on the U.S. military. Some of these shows include the History of Navy SEALs, Special Operations, U.S. Customs; The Complete History of Green Berets; and Inside the Britannic. He was additionally approached by a group of Navy SEALs with a consultant company outside of the military, which resulted in producing several military training videos. His documentaries have been shown on The History Channel and Discovery Channel, and sold worldwide.

In 2006, Brutsman and BCII created a U.S. Military corporate sponsorship program for a Marine platoon stationed in Iraq and their families back home. He oversaw efforts to collect exercise equipment, DVDs, magazines, and other supplies to be sent to the troops overseas, as well as organizing events and functions for the troops' families.

== Personal life ==
Brutsman is married to actress and television host Adrienne Janic.

== Filmography ==
Executive producer

- 1990: Rock-N-Roll Legends Series
- 1998: Natural Disasters
- 1999: The Complete History of the Navy Seals
- 1999: Femme Fatales
- 1999: Hollywood Hall of Fame
- 2000: Action Heroes
- 2000: Cheating Las Vegas
- 2000: The History of the Green Berets
- 2000: Young Hollywood Superstars
- 2001: U.S. Customs: Special Agents
- 2001: Special Operations (Four-part military series)
- 2001: Hollywood Raw
- 2002: Elvis and June: A Love Story
- 2002: Inside the Britannic
- 2000–2003: King of the Cage (V. 1–24) Live PPV
- 2004: Rides
- 2006: CES: Consumer Electronics Show
- 2006: Extreme Yachts Special
- 2006-2013: Hot Rod TV
- 2006: Payback
- 2007: Forza Motorsports Showdown (mini series)
- 2007: Get Out Way Out
- 2007: Stress Test
- 2007–2008: Celebrity Rides (Burt Reynolds)
- 2004–2020: Overhaulin'
- 2008: Chasing Baja (documentary)
- 2008: Celebrity Rides (Kevin Dillon)
- 2008–2009: Celebrity Rides (Jay Leno)
- 2008–2009: Hot Import Nights
- 2008–2009: Livin' the Low Life
- 2009-2014: Optima Ultimate Street Car Invitational
- 2009: Raptor Documentary
- 2009: Celebrity Rides (Steve McQueen)
- 2009: Jet Set: with Jay Leno
- 2007–2010: Living with Ed
- 2009–2011: Garage Mahal
- 2009–2015: Car Crazy
- 2010: Midnight Munchies
- 2010: Xtreme Eating
- 2011: American Trucker
- 2011: Punk Payback with Bas Rutten
- 2011: Shark Fights
- 2011: Esquire: Ultimate Bachelor Pad
- 2011: Single with 7
- 2011: The BOSS is Back
- 2011-2012 Inside West Coast Customs
- 2012-2019: Extreme RVs
- 2012: Naturally Beautiful
- 2012: Hollywood For Sale
- 2012: Turbine Cowboys
- 2012: Magic Outlaws
- 2012: Extreme Yachts
- 2013: Backroad Gold
- 2013: Big Cool Stuff
- 2013: Extreme Doomsday Vehicles
- 2013: Extreme Doomsday Bunkers
- 2013: Extreme Factories
- 2013: Extreme Toys
- 2013: Rock My RV
- 2013: Viper: Soul Survivor
- 2013: R U Faster Than a Redneck?
- 2014-2016: Flippin RVs
- 2014-2021: SEMA Battle of the Builders
- 2014-2021: World Desert Championship
- 2015: Fit, Fabulous and Famous
- 2015: RV Nation
- 2015: Animal Storm Squad
- 2016: Everest Air
- 2016: Classic Cars
- 2016-2017: Competition Ready
- 2016-2021 Road to the Battle of the Builders
- 2017: Race of Champions
- 2017: Beachin' RVs
- 2017: Race of Champions
- 2017: Beachin' RVs
- 2016-2018: Roadworthy
- 2019: Ignite Your Life
- 2019: Inside Overhaulin'
- 2020: Ready for Battle with AJ
- 2020: High Performance House Calls
- 2019-2021: The Fixers
- 2021: Expedition: Back to the Future
- 2021: Fully Torqued
