= David & Layla =

- Film poster
- Directed by: Jay Jonroy aka J.J Alani
- Written by: Jay Jonroy aka J.J. Alani
- Produced by: Jay Jonroy aka J.J. Alani; Gill Holland; Isen Robbins; Aimee Schoof
- Starring: David Moscow; Shiva Rose
- Distributed by: Films International Corp
- Release date: October 21, 2005
- Running time: 106 minutes
- Country: United States
- Language: English

David & Layla is a 2005 independent film written and directed by Jay Jonroy.

== Plot ==
Inspired by a true story, sparks fly when a Jew and a Kurdish Muslim fall in love in New York. David (David Moscow), TV host of "Sex & Happiness", becomes smitten with the voluptuous Layla (Shiva Rose) - a mysterious, sensual dancer who turns out to be a refugee from Kurdistan, fleeing from Saddam Hussein's regime. David's reckless pursuit of Layla sets off an unveiling of the similarities and contrasts of their ancient cultures. His lust grows into love as he discovers in stunning Layla a sensitive, intelligent war survivor with a rich culture that echoes his own. But their families are dead set against their unlikely romance. Faced with deportation, Layla must choose: David or Dr. Ahmad? Will David and Layla follow their hearts and blast through centuries of religious animosity?

Written, produced, and directed by Jay Jonroy aka J.J. Alani, this film was inspired by the true story of the Kurdish Muslim-Jewish couple Alwan Jaff and her husband David Ruby who now live in Paris. Both appear in cameo roles in the film.

== Cast ==
- David Moscow as David Fine
- Shiva Rose as Layla
- Callie Thorne as Abby
- Peter Van Wagner
- Polly Adams
- Will Janowitz as Woody Fine
- Anna George as Zina, Uncle Al's Wife
- Ed Chemaly
- Alexander Blaise
- Tibor Feldman as Rabbi Rabinovich

== Reception ==
The Washington Post called it "a frothy little romantic comedy." Variety described it as "an earnest, frequently funny comedy." Film Journal International said "the picture takes its time in developing momentum; once attained, it becomes a watchable, optimistic cri de coeur."
