= DysEnchanted =

- Directed by: Terri Edda Miller
- Written by: Terri Edda Miller
- Starring: Laura Kightlinger; Sarah Wynter; Alexis Bledel; Jaime Bergman; K.D. Aubert; Shiva Rose McDermott; Amy Pietz; Jill Small; James Belushi
- Release date: 2004
- Running time: 12 min.

DysEnchanted is a short subject about seven storybook characters: Cinderella, Snow White, Goldilocks, Sleeping Beauty, Alice In Wonderland, Dorothy, and Little Red Riding Hood. They are in group therapy dishing and dealing with what comes after "happily ever after". When Clara, a New Jersey divorcee, joins the group, she discovers that life is no fairy tale.

Written and directed by Terri Miller, DysEnchanted is only eight minutes long (six, without credits). It was shot in Culver City, California over two ten-hours days. It was originally supposed to be longer, but was slimmed down due to time constraints. The little-known film was released in 2004.

== Cast ==
- Laura Kightlinger (Cinderella)
- Sarah Wynter (Sleeping Beauty)
- Alexis Bledel (Goldilocks)
- Jaime Bergman (Alice)
- K.D. Aubert (Little Red Riding Hood)
- Shiva Rose McDermott (Snow White)
- Amy Pietz (Clara)
- Jill Small (Dorothy)
- James Belushi (The Shrink/Doctor)
