= Dollaz on My Head =

2020 single by Gunna featuring Young Thug

Single by Gunna featuring Young Thug

from the album Wunna
- Released: July 6, 2020
- Genre: Trap
- Length: 3:17
- Label: YSL; 300
- Songwriters: Sergio Kitchens; Jeffery Williams; Michael Williams II; Myles Harris
- Producers: Mike Will Made It; Harris

Gunna singles chronology
"Fox 5" (2020)	"Dollaz on My Head" (2020)	"Cafeteria" (2020)

Young Thug singles chronology
"Go Crazy" (2020)	"Dollaz on My Head" (2020)	"Compensating" (2020)

Music video
- "Dollaz on My Head" on YouTube

"Dollaz on My Head" is a song by American rapper Gunna featuring fellow American rapper Young Thug. Produced by Mike Will Made It and Myles Harris, it was sent to rhythmic contemporary radio on July 6, 2020 as the third single from Gunna's second studio album Wunna (2020).

== Chart performance ==
Dollaz on My Head debuted and peaked at number 38 on the US Billboard Hot 100 chart, on the week of June 6, 2020. This became Gunna's eighth top 40 hit and his highest charting song from the album "Wunna". The song debuted on the chart with 12 other songs from "Wunna" On April 1, 2025, the song was certified triple platinum by the Recording Industry Association of America (RIAA) for combined sales and streaming equivalent units of over three million units in the United States.

== Music video ==
The music video premiered on July 24, 2020 via YouTube. Directed by Spike Jordan and Maxime Quoilin, it starts off with Gunna, who is playing golf on the balcony of his mansion, calling Young Thug through FaceTime. His game is then interrupted by a family wishing to welcome him into their neighborhood. He invites them in, and the family is surprised by the luxury of his house.

== Charts ==
=== Weekly charts ===
Weekly chart performance for "Dollaz on My Head"
Chart (2020)	Peak position
Canada Hot 100 (Billboard)	53
New Zealand Hot Singles (RMNZ)	8
US Billboard Hot 100	38
US Hot R&B/Hip-Hop Songs (Billboard)	15
US Rhythmic Airplay (Billboard)	39

=== Year-end charts ===
Year-end chart performance for "Dollaz on My Head"
Chart (2020)	Position
US Hot R&B/Hip-Hop Songs (Billboard)	63

== Certifications ==
Certifications for "Dollaz on My Head"
Region	Certification	Certified units/sales
Canada (Music Canada)	3× Platinum	240,000^{‡}
New Zealand (RMNZ)	Platinum	30,000^{‡}
South Africa (RISA)	Gold	20,000^{‡}
United Kingdom (BPI)	Silver	200,000^{‡}
United States (RIAA)	3× Platinum	3,000,000^{‡}
^{‡} Sales+streaming figures based on certification alone.
