= Wuna (disambiguation) =

Wuna, or Djerimanga, is an indigenous Australian people.

Wuna may also refer to:

- WUNA (1480 AM), a radio station licensed to Ocoee, Florida
- Wuna language, an extinct indigenous language of Australia
- Wuna of Wessex (circa 8th century), Anglo-Saxon noblewoman and Christian saint

== See also ==
- Wunna (disambiguation)
