= Got Damn =

2024 single by Gunna

Single by Gunna
- Released: December 20, 2024
- Length: 2:36
- Label: YSL; 300
- Songwriters: Sergio Kitchens; Kenneth Gilmore; Isaiah Blouir; David Gevorgyan; Joseph Carillo; Shapi Gadzhiev; Kenya Brunson
- Producers: Aviator Keyyz; Bloublood; Timpani Beatz; J Kari

Gunna singles chronology
"Him All Along" (2024)	"Got Damn" (2024)	"Classy Girl" (2025)

Music video
- "Got Damn" on YouTube

"Got Damn" is a song by American rapper Gunna. It was released as a single through YSL Records and 300 Entertainment on December 20, 2024. Gunna wrote the song with producers Aviator Keyyz, Bloublood, J Kari, and Timpani Beatz.

== Background ==
Gunna previewed the song in August 2024, and later in October during the release of his single "Him All Along". The song was teased once more in the video of "Him All Along" in November, before being released in December.

== Composition and lyrics ==
The song contains a minimal instrumental, with kick drums in different places. In the chorus, he sing-raps in reflection on the exhausting aspects of his life and career: "On and off the jet, goddamn / Uh, I don't get no rest, goddamn / I want my respect, goddamn / I been running up a check, yeah (Yeah)". He also boasts his luxurious lifestyle and celebrates the wealth he has earned from his career success.

== Music video ==
The music video was released on December 31, 2024. Directed by Spike Jordan, it sees Gunna traveling and performing around the world, in the cities of Los Angeles, Las Vegas, New York City, Philadelphia, Dubai and Lagos. He dines and hangs out with friends and fans before his concerts and is seen around luxurious environments.

== Charts ==
Chart performance for "Got Damn"
Chart (2024–2025)	Peak position
New Zealand Hot Singles (RMNZ)	19
US Bubbling Under Hot 100 (Billboard)	3
US Hot R&B/Hip-Hop Songs (Billboard)	34
