= Producer tag =

Short phrase crediting the music producer

Example of a producer tag

A producer tag (sometimes simply called a tag) is an element of a song, typically at the beginning of it, inserted there by the song's producer – a short sound meant to familiarize the listener with who is responsible for the production of the song. Most notably prevalent in hip hop music, producer tags became popular during the 2000s, and were first used as a way for producers to identify themselves on songs, or "sign" the instrumental (commonly known as a "beat") they made as protection against someone stealing the beat. They experienced a massive rise in popularity during the late 2000s and early 2010s with the rise of the trap subgenre.

A producer tag usually includes someone saying a short, memorable phrase announcing their presence on the track; an example of this is Young Chop's producer tag, the phrase "Young Chop on the beat", which was said by Chop's nephew and recorded.

It is not always necessarily a spoken phrase, though; for example, The Neptunes' signature "four-count start" and Lex Luger's "synth crescendo" may also be considered producer tags. Some contemporary hip hop music producers who are famous for their tags include Metro Boomin, DJ Khaled, Mike Will Made It, Harry Fraud, Tay Keith, F1LTHY, Take a Daytrip, J. R. Rotem, Murda Beatz, Jetsonmade, Jason Derulo, and Wheezy, among others. Typically, producers' tags are unique to them, acting as one of the elements of a producer's signature style.

== History ==
Producer tags originated in the 1990s, when hip hop music was beginning to get significant mainstream attention, when it was commonplace for rappers to loudly announce their names over the instrumentals, which was known as ad-libbing. They were popularized by DJs such as Kool DJ Red Alert. It is unclear who was the first producer to utilize a producer tag on their track. They were initially used as a form of protection against somebody stealing the beat; the musical equivalent of an artist signing their art. Lucas Garrison of DJBooth wrote: "When you send out a beat, you have little to no control over what happens to it. Someone could very well use it without giving you credit, or even worse, claim it as their own. One way producers can prevent this from happening is through a drop. Adding a catchy little snippet at the beginning is like a watermark, it ensures everyone knows who the beat belongs to."

Producer tags have roots in the spoken drops used by mixtape DJs. As online beat selling grew, producers also placed repeated vocal tags throughout preview instrumentals to discourage unauthorized use.

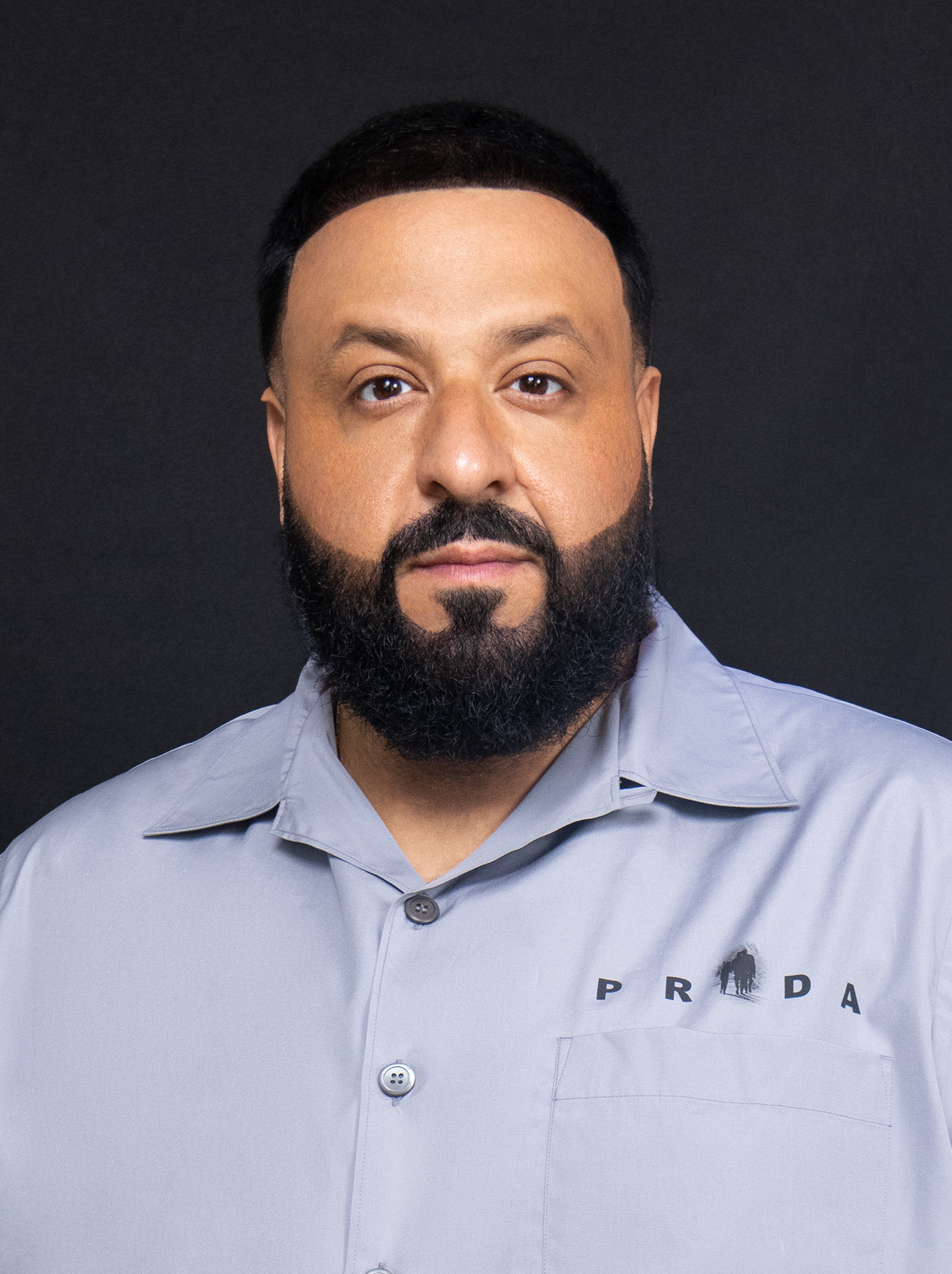
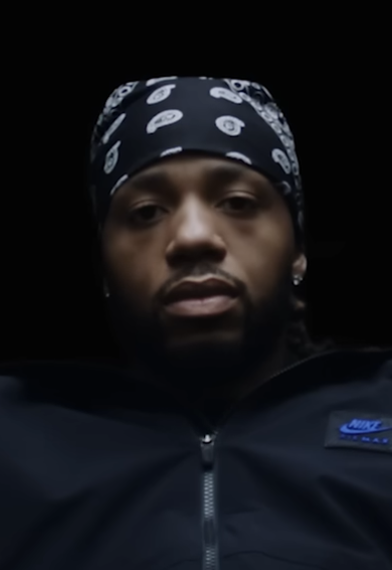
Notable producers who are known for their trademark tags include DJ Khaled (Another one!) and Metro Boomin (If Young Metro don't trust you, I'm gon' shoot you)

Over time, however, the producer tag evolved into being not only a signature, but also a way to create a "brand" for the producer. It began being used as a sort of slogan with the intention of making sure the listener knows and remembers, consciously or subconsciously, who is responsible for the music's production. Producers figured the more memorable their producer tag phrase is, the more likely it is to leave a positive impression on the listener; it became a form of marketing their music to people. It was also a way to establish the producer as an important contributor to the music's sound – music producers were often uncredited and unknown by the general audience, so including their name in the song became necessary to establish themselves as important figures. Tags started becoming extremely popular when subgenres such as trap and mumble rap gained popularity in the late 2000s and early 2010s, and they eventually became a noted element of a hip hop song. One of the most notable (though not one of the first) producers to start incorporating short, memorable phrases into their beats in the 2010s is Metro Boomin, who quickly became known by the phrases "Metro!", which was said by rapper Young Thug and "If Young Metro don't trust you, I'm gon' shoot you" was said by rapper Future, recorded, and then utilized as a producer tag in songs produced by Boomin. The latter tag was famously used in Kanye West's 2016 hit, "Father Stretch My Hands, Pt. 1," significantly contributing to the popularity of Boomin as a reputable producer, and to the popularity of hip hop producer tags in general.

== Creation ==
Producer tags may be taken from existing recordings. Engineer Alex Tumay created Metro Boomin’s “Metro Boomin want some more” tag from Young Thug’s song “Some More”, while Pi’erre Bourne’s tag samples dialogue from The Jamie Foxx Show.

== Notable producer tags ==
- Conductor Williams: “Conductor, we have a problem.”
- Dem Jointz: "Incominggg"
- Jahlil Beats: “Jahlil Beats, holla at me.”
- Jetsonmade: “Oh Lord, Jetson made another one!”
- London on da Track: “We got London On Da Track!”
- Metro Boomin: “If Young Metro don’t trust you, I’ma shoot you.”
- Murda Beatz: “Murda on the beat, so it’s not nice.”
- Mustard: “Mustard on the beat, ho!”
- RedOne: “Red One!”
- Turbo: “Run that back, Turbo!”
- Wheezy: “Wheezy outta here!”
- D.A. Got That Dope: “D.A. got that dope!”
- F1lthy: "Wake up F1lthy"
