= Anna George =

Indian born American actress

- Born: Anna George
- Years active: 2003–present

Anna George is an American actress. Born in India, she came to the United States for her higher education. She earned an undergraduate degree from Wellesley College and an MBA from Columbia Business School, and worked in finance.

She has had most of her acting career in television series, including recurring roles in several programs.

== Filmography ==
Year	Title	Role	Notes
2003	Law & Order: Special Victims Unit	Josephine	Ep: Serendipity
2004	Sex and the City	Padma	Ep: Let There Be Light
2004	The Jury	Dr. Mira Shah	Ep: Memories
2005	Law & Order: Trial by Jury	Adele	Ep: Pattern of Conduct
2005	Confess	Anna Martin	
2005	David & Layla	Zina-Uncle Als Wife	
2005	Syriana	Reza's sister	uncredited
2006	Law & Order: Criminal Intent	Dr. Anita Chandary	Ep: Drama Giocoso
2006	3 lbs	Dr. Helen Clark	Heart Stopping
2007	The Bride	Mother	Short
2008	Law & Order	Dr. Anita Chandary	Ep: Misbegotten
2008	Anjali	Mita	Short
2009	The Lovely Bones	Mrs. Singh	
2009–2014	Royal Pains	Rubina Katdare	Recurring cast
2012	Concussion	Dr. Jofar	
2012	Indelible	Gwen Adani	
2013	Criminal Minds	Barbara Moore	Ep: Magnum Opus
2013	Rules of Engagement	Varsha Patel	Ep: Catering
2014	Radhe Radhe: Rites of Holi	Radha	Short
2015	Miss India America	Divya Nielsen	
2015	Madam Secretary	Marajel Javani	Ep: Tamerlane
2016	New Girl	Priyanka	
2018–2019	God Friended Me	Sunita	Canc. due to Covid pandemic
2019	Draupadi Unleashed	Amma	
2020	For Life	Dr. Davidson	Ep: Do Us Part
2021	The Resident	Vineeta Devi	Ep: Who Will You Be
2022	Partner Track	Cleo Bajaj	Recurring cast
2023	Jules	Dr. North	
