= One Call (Gunna song) =

2019 single by Gunna

Single by Gunna

from the album Drip or Drown 2
- Released: February 1, 2019
- Length: 3:16
- Label: YSL; 300 Entertainment
- Songwriters: Sergio Kitchens; Chandler Durham; Wesley Jones
- Producers: Turbo; Jet

Gunna singles chronology
| "Space Cadet" (2019) | "One Call" (2019) | "Speed It Up" (2019) |

Music video
- "One Call" on YouTube

"One Call" is a song by American rapper Gunna, released on February 1, 2019, as the lead single from his debut studio album, Drip or Drown 2.

== Background ==
Gunna announced the release of the single on January 28, 2019, and it released four days later.

== Composition ==
The instrumental of the song, produced by Turbo, has been described as sounding like it was "made underwater". Gunna sing-raps about his riches and lifestyle, in an "addictive melody".

== Music video ==
Directed by Spike Jordan, the music video was released on February 1, 2019, along with the single.

== Charts ==
Chart performance for "One Call"
| Chart (2019) | Peak position |
|---|---|
| Canada Hot 100 (Billboard) | 78 |
| New Zealand Hot Singles (RMNZ) | 18 |
| US Billboard Hot 100 | 56 |
| US Hot R&B/Hip-Hop Songs (Billboard) | 23 |

== Certification ==
Certifications for "One Call"
| Region | Certification | Certified units/sales |
|---|---|---|
| United States (RIAA) | Gold | 500,000^{‡} |
^{‡} Sales+streaming figures based on certification alone.
