= Shiva Rose =

American actress, activist, and blogger (born 1969)

- Born: Shiva Rose Afshar; February 8, 1969 (age 57); Santa Monica, California, U.S.
- Other name: Shiva Rose McDermott
- Occupations: Actress, blogger, activist, beauty products
- Spouse: Dylan McDermott (m. 1995; div. 2009)
- Children: 2
- Website: https://www.thelocalrose.com/

Shiva Rose Afshar (born 1969) is an American actress, activist, blogger, and owner of a natural beauty-product line. She is the former wife of actor Dylan McDermott.

== Early life ==
Shiva Rose Afshar was born on 8 February 1969 in Santa Monica, California to an American mother and Iranian father. Her father Parviz Gharib-Afshar (or Parviz Gharibafshar) is a former Iranian television host and actor. She lived in Iran until 1979, when her family fled during the Iranian Revolution.

== Career ==
Rose's past film credits include the 20th Century Fox feature The First $20 Million Is Always the Hardest, directed by Mick Jackson and HBO's original film 61*, directed by Billy Crystal. She starred in the independent film Black Days and was featured at the 2001 Slamdance Film Festival. She appeared in the features Myron's Movie and Red Roses and Petrol with Malcolm McDowell, and Silent Madness-Hollywood Babylon in which she plays the silent screen star Louise Brooks. She completed the short film DysEnchanted, playing the role of Snow White, which premiered at Sundance in January 2004.

Rose starred in the independent comedy film, David & Layla, which won Prix du Public at the Amour Film Festival. David & Layla was awarded over La Vie en Rose, 2 Days in Paris and Lady Chatterley.

Roses's television credits include The Division, Gideon's Crossing and The Practice.

Rose has a Los Angeles-themed bohemian living and holistic health blog, The Local Rose.

== Activism ==
While attending college at the University of California, Los Angeles (UCLA), Rose founded Resource, a program to feed the homeless. She is a sponsor for VIP (Violence Intervention Program), which helps abused children, and volunteered at Caring for Children and Families with AIDS (CCFA) in Los Angeles.

== Personal life ==
Rose married actor Dylan McDermott in 1995 and they have two daughters: Collette, born 1996, and Charlotte, born 2005. On September 27, 2007, People confirmed that Rose and McDermott had separated. On May 21, 2008, Dylan filed for divorce, which was finalized on January 2, 2009.

== See also ==
- List of Iranian actresses
