= Skybox (song) =

2020 single by Gunna

Single by Gunna

from the album Wunna
- Released: March 6, 2020
- Genre: Trap
- Length: 2:58
- Label: YSL; 300
- Songwriter: Sergio Kitchens
- Producer: Taurus

Gunna singles chronology
"Cash Cow" (2019)	"Skybox" (2020)	"Turks" (2020)

Music video
- "Skybox" on YouTube

"Skybox" (stylized in all caps) is a single by American rapper Gunna, released on March 6, 2020 along with the music video. It is the lead single from his second studio album Wunna (2020). The song was produced by Taurus.

== Music video ==
The music video was directed by Spike Jordan and opens with a claymation of Gunna on a hot air balloon floating in the clouds. It crashes after being flicked by a belly dancer. The video then switches to live-action, with Gunna lying on a field beside the deflated balloon. He wakes up and walks to a Moroccan village nearby, wandering in its streets and then partying with the locals.

== Charts ==
Chart (2020)	Peak position
New Zealand Hot Singles (RMNZ)	24
US Billboard Hot 100	65
US Hot R&B/Hip-Hop Songs (Billboard)	30

== Certifications ==
Region	Certification	Certified units/sales
Canada (Music Canada)	Gold	40,000^{‡}
United States (RIAA)	Gold	500,000^{‡}
^{‡} Sales+streaming figures based on certification alone.
