= Fantanas =

Group of spokesmodels for Fanta

- Third incarnation of the Fantanas, introduced in 2006.
- Created by: Ogilvy and Mather

In-universe information
- Type: Promotion for the Fanta brand of soft drinks

The Fantanas were a dance group created to promote the Fanta brand of soft drinks. Four women representing fruit flavors lip synced the jingle "Wanna Fanta! Don't you wanna?" The jingle itself was produced by John Alters, and co-written by John Alters and Eric Kupper. The quartet has appeared in advertising and personal appearances since 2002, with the original group disbanding in 2006. The Fantanas have been rebranded five times, with the most recent group re-introduced as a co-ed dance ensemble promoting inclusivity in 2017.

== The creation of the Fantanas ==
According to the Fantanas' website, the group originally lived on the fictional Fantana Island and were accidentally discovered by entertainment mogul Sir Juan-Carlos Martinez III, after he fell off his yacht and washed ashore. After a discussion with advertising mogul Paul Gurbel, the group was brought to the United States. In reality, the advertisements were created in partnership with Coca-Cola and Ogilvy and Mather in 2001.

== Incarnations ==
=== Original Fantanas (2001–2004) ===
The original lineup of Fantanas donned an island party style. The members consisted of:

- Nina (K.D. Aubert) - red (strawberry Fanta)
- Calli (Jennifer Diaz) - orange (orange Fanta)
- Leelee (Adrienne Janic) - yellow (pineapple Fanta)
- Raquel (Andrea De Oliveira) - purple (grape Fanta)

They gained attention outside their advertisements for their campiness and use of sexuality. They were also featured in a Maxim magazine spread in December 2002.

=== "Mod" Fantanas (2004–2006) ===
In 2004, the Fantanas returned with styles inspired by the late 1960s mod fashion. The members consisted of:

- Capri (Kat Graham) - red (strawberry Fanta)
- Kiki - orange (orange Fanta); leader
- Lola - yellow (pineapple Fanta)
- Sophia (Monica Flores) - purple (grape Fanta)

Kiki and Lola kept their real names private.

=== "Party" Fantanas (2006–2009) ===
In 2006, the next-generation lineup of Fantanas was introduced with a contemporary party style. The commercials were filmed in Argentina. The members consisted of:

- Kaia (Danielle Acoff) - red (strawberry Fanta)
- Amie (Dena Cali) - orange (orange Fanta); leader
- Mimi (Mimi Karsh) - yellow (pineapple Fanta)
- Sophia (Monica Flores) - purple (grape Fanta); character held over from the second incarnation (see above)

=== Return of the Fantanas (2009–2011) ===
In April 2009, it was announced that the New Fantanas would be advertising the original Fanta flavors, and each member would have an individual fashion style. The lineup included:

- Summer (Diana Carr) - orange (orange Fanta); indie, healthy hippie style, leader.
- Melody (Katherine Wilkes) - purple (grape Fanta); music-loving, punk, rockstar style.
- Isabela (Marilinda Rivera) - red (strawberry Fanta); fashionable, sexy, red-hot style.
- Lily (Brittany Hampton) - yellow (pineapple Fanta); cute, chic style. Brittany was voted as the winner of the 4th Fantana Search in Summer/Fall 2010. Replaced Shakira Barrera.

=== "Be More Than One Flavor" Fantanas (2017–present) ===
In 2017, Fanta reintroduced the Fantanas with a modern style, encouraging consumers to be "more than one flavor". This lineup also included a male member for the first time, which includes:

- Eva (Eva Gutowski) - orange (orange Fanta)
- Coco (Coco Jones) - purple (grape Fanta)
- Jordan (Jordan Fisher) - red (strawberry Fanta)
- Lauren (Lauren Riihimaki) - yellow (pineapple Fanta)

== MADtv parody ==
The Fantanas were twice parodied on the sketch comedy series MADtv. Both appearances (Episodes #1004 and #1009, aired 6 November and 18 December 2004, respectively) starred Daniele Gaither as Capri, Stephnie Weir as Lola, Nicole Parker as Kiki, and Paul C. Vogt as "Two-Liter" Beth. The commercials were similar to the real Fantanas commercials, with Capri, Lola, and Kiki offering Fanta to a series of men, only to be interrupted by Beth's attempts to "seduce" the men with a two-liter bottle of Fanta Grape (and some blurred nudity, but only from the waist up). The former episode featured the Fantanas representing similar Fanta flavors, but the latter episode (aired just before Christmas) featured the Fantanas representing holiday-themed Fanta. The holiday-themed lineup included:

- Candy Cane Capri (Gaither)
- Cinnamon Spice Lola (Weir)
- Frosted Gingerbread Kiki (Parker)
- Holiday Ham Dinner Beth (Vogt)

== Other parodies ==
Sanka Girls appearing on Family Guy

The Fantanas also made an appearance in the popular animated show Robot Chicken, namely in the episode "Adoption's an Option" in 2006.

In the "Peter's Daughter" episode of Family Guy, first shown on November 25, 2007, the Fantanas were parodied as four elderly women promoting Sanka.

The Australian comedian Pam Ann uses the Fantana jingle as a catchphrase when she does her routine as the Iberia Airlines stewardess Conchita Rosa María González Gómez in her shows.
