= Jaime Bergman =

American model and actress

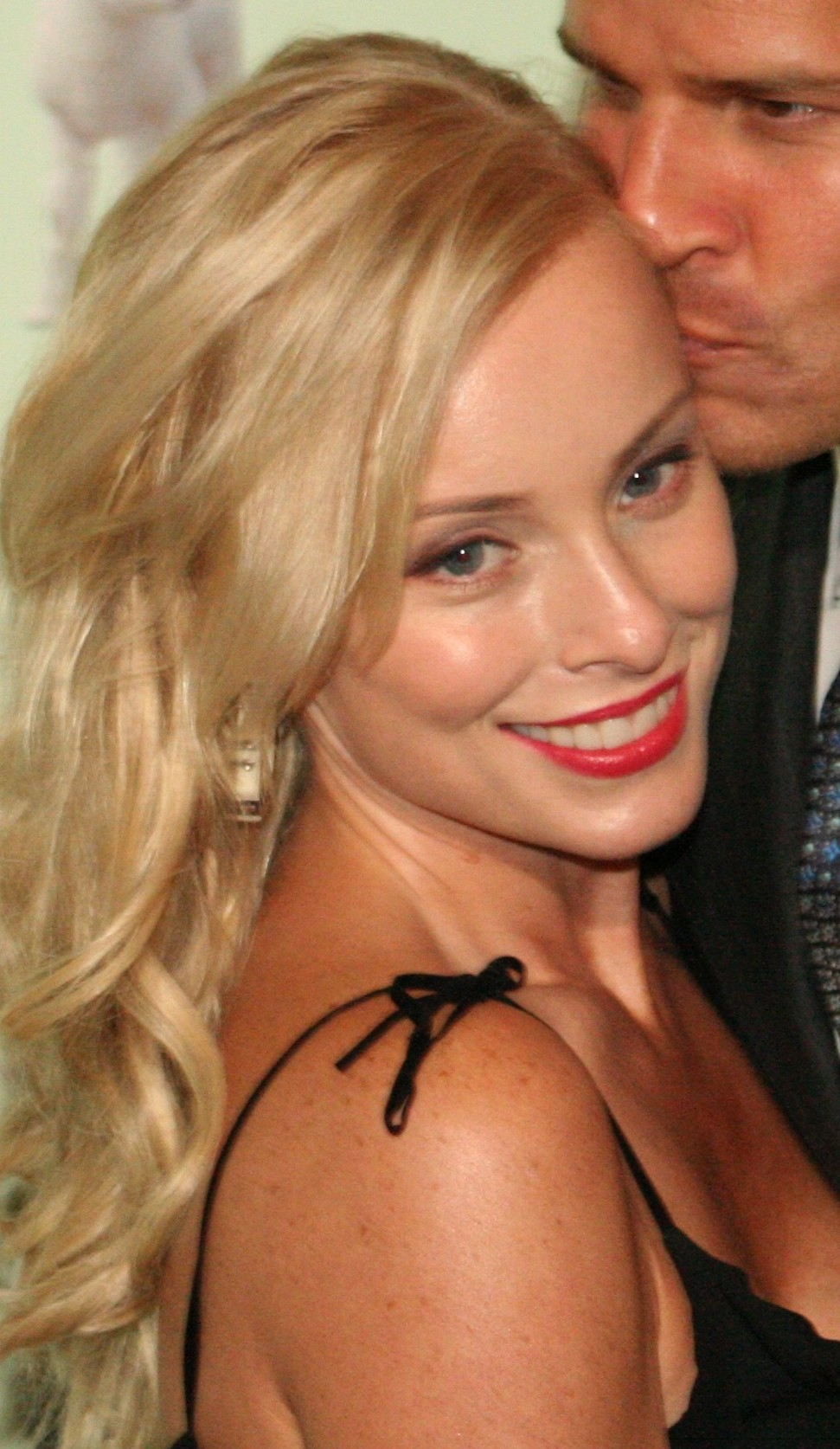
- Bergman in 2006
- Born: Jaime Bergman; September 23, 1975 (age 49); Salt Lake City, Utah, U.S.
- Other names: Jaime Boreanaz
- Occupation(s): Model, actress
- Years active: 1999–present
- Spouse: David Boreanaz (m. 2001)
- Children: 2

Playboy centerfold appearance
- January 1999
- Preceded by: Nicole, Erica, and Jaclyn Dahm
- Succeeded by: Stacy Marie Fuson

Jaime Bergman Boreanaz (born September 23, 1975) is an American model and actress who was Playboy magazine's Playmate of the Month in January 1999, its 45th Anniversary issue. In addition to her magazine appearance she has appeared in several Playboy videos.

== Career ==
Bergman was the St. Pauli Girl for 1999, the first of the Playmate national spokesmodels for the beer brand. She has also worked as a Prudential real estate agent.

From 2000 to 2002, Bergman played the character of "B. J. Cummings" in the Howard Stern Baywatch spoof, Son of the Beach. In July 2000, she appeared on the cover of Playboy and in a new nude pictorial inside to promote the show.

== Personal life ==
Jaime Bergman was born in Salt Lake City, Utah. She married actor David Boreanaz on November 24, 2001. They have a son, Jaden Rayne (born May 1, 2002), and a daughter, born in August 2009 whose name was later changed to Bella Vita.

In 2010, Boreanaz admitted to having an extramarital affair with Rachel Uchitel, the same woman Tiger Woods was alleged to have an affair with, while he was married. At the time of Boreanaz's affair, Bergman was pregnant with Boreanaz's daughter.

For Valentine's Day 2013, she legally changed her last name to Boreanaz as a gift to her husband and children.

In 2013, Jaime, David, and their friends Melissa and Aaron Ravo started a nail polish line called Chrome Girl. The two wives run the day-to-day operations while their husbands help with the overall business.

== Filmography ==
=== Film ===
Year	Film	Role
1999	Any Given Sunday	Party Girl
1999	Speedway Junky	Bombshell #1
2000	Daybreak a.k.a. Rapid Transit	Suzy
2000	Gone in 60 Seconds	Blonde in Drag Race
2001	Soulkeeper	Buxom Blonde
2001	Virgins	Melissa
2003	Knee High P.I.	Candi MacIntyre
2003	Dark Wolf	McGowan
2003	Pauly Shore Is Dead	Zoey Abernacky
2004	Boa vs. Python	Monica Bonds
2004	DysEnchanted	Alice
2009	Screwball: The Ted Whitfield Story	Kim Dominguez
2023	Natty Knocks	Katie Hales

=== Television ===
Year	Title	Role	Episode(s)
1999	The Love Boat: The Next Wave	Woman	Episode: "Trances of a Lifetime"
1999	Beverly Hills, 90210	Trish Jansen	Episode: "The Loo-Ouch"
2000	Shasta McNasty	Girl #2	Episode: "Leo Is a Pain In My Ass"
2000	Brutally Normal	Merrill	Episode: "Mouth Full of Warm Roses"
2000–2002	Son of the Beach	BJ Cummings	42 episodes
2002	Dawson's Creek	Denise	Episode: "Ego Tripping at the Gates of Hell"
2004	Angel	Amanda	Episode: "Time Bomb"
2004	It's All Relative	Sasha	Episode: "Who's Camping Now"
2017	Bones	Dawn Skaggs	Episode: "The Steel in the Wheels"

== Appearances in Playboy Special Editions ==
- Playboy's Playmate Review — August 2000, pp. 4–11.
- Playboy's Playmates in Bed — October 2000, pp. 10–13.
- Playboy's Wet & Wild — January 2001, pp. 2–3 & 44–45.
- Playboy's Sexy Celebrities — February 2001, pp. 48–51.
- Playboy's Nude Playmates — April 2001, pp. 60–63.
- Playboy's Book of Lingerie — May 2001, pp. 76–79.

Jaime Bergman	Stacy Marie Fuson	Alexandria Karlsen	Natalia Sokolova	Tishara Cousino	Kimberly Spicer
Jennifer Rovero	Rebecca Scott	Kristi Cline	Jodi Ann Paterson	Cara Wakelin	Brooke Richards
