= Bachelor (song) =

2023 single by Turbo and Gunna

Single by Turbo and Gunna
- Released: November 3, 2023
- Genre: Trap; R&B
- Length: 4:01
- Label: YSL; 300
- Songwriters: Chandler Great; Sergio Kitchens; Nico Muhly; James Blake
- Producers: Turbo; Gray Toomey

Turbo singles chronology
"Quarantine Clean" (2020)	"Bachelor" (2023)

Gunna singles chronology
"This Year (Blessings) (Remix)" (2023)	"Bachelor" (2023)	"Happiness" (2023)

Music video
- "Bachelor" on YouTube

"Bachelor" is a song by American record producer Turbo and American rapper Gunna, released on November 3, 2023. Produced by Turbo and Gray Toomey, it contains a sample of "Do You Ever" by James Blake.

== Background ==
Gunna first performed the song at a concert in Los Angeles in September 2023 and previewed it via social media on October 23, 2023. The song was originally scheduled for release on October 27, 2023, but was delayed. On November 1, Turbo and Gunna announced the song would be released on November 3, 2023.

== Composition ==
"Bachelor" samples a piano melody and vocals from James Blake's "Do You Ever", A trap and R&B song, it uses a drum beat and finds Gunna lusting after a certain person, with lyrics about fornication, fellatio, and his wealth.

== Critical reception ==
Kemet High of Complex gave a positive review of the song, describing it as "elegant" and writing "Turbo's production rewraps James Blake's 'Do You Ever?' into a dreamy vista that Gunna glides over with aquatic flows. All in all, 'Bachelor' adds to the plush archive of two talented musicians that truly don't miss together. There's no reality where someone won't run this back after pressing play for the first time."

== Music video ==
An official music video premiered on January 18, 2024. Directed by Spike Jordan, it features a cast of well-known video vixens that have appeared 2000's music videos, including K.D. Aubert, Rosa Acosta, Eboni Jackson, LaNisha Cole, Esther Baxter, Tammy Torres, Bria Myles and Sasha Lee. The clip shows Turbo playing a grand piano and Gunna surrounded by a luxurious lifestyle.

== Charts ==
Chart performance for "Bachelor"
Chart (2023)	Peak position
New Zealand Hot Singles (RMNZ)	19
US Bubbling Under Hot 100 (Billboard)	21
US Hot R&B/Hip-Hop Songs (Billboard)	40
