= Overhaulin' =

American television series

- Genre: Reality
- Created by: W. Clark Bunting
- Presented by: Chris Jacobs; Arianny Celeste (2013–2015); Jessi Combs (2012–2013); Adrienne Janic (2005–2008, 2014-2015, 2019-); Courtney Hansen (2004–2005)
- Starring: Chip Foose
- Opening theme: "Gasoline" by Kicking Harold (2004–2007, 2014–2015)
- Country of origin: United States
- Original language: English
- No. of seasons: 9
- No. of episodes: 113

Production
- Executive producers: Bud W. Brutsman (2004–2008); Susan B. Flanagan (2004–2008); Chip Foose (2012–2015)
- Producers: Chad Marshall (season 3); Josh Kameyer (season 6–7) (2012–2014)
- Running time: 45 minutes
- Production companies: BCI Communications (2004–2008); WATV Productions (2012–2015)

Original release
- Network: TLC
- Release: April 13, 2004 – June 26, 2008
- Network: Velocity & Discovery
- Release: October 2, 2012 – November 18, 2015

Overhaulin' is an American automotive reality television series. The show originally ran for five seasons between 2004 and 2008 on TLC. After a four-year hiatus, sixth season premiered on October 2, 2012 on Velocity and Discovery (Cablevision). In June 2019, it was announced that the show would be returning for a new season on November 16, 2019 on Motor Trend.

== Hosts ==
The show's hosts were automobile designer Chip Foose and co-host Chris Jacobs; the creator and producer was Bud Brutsman. Courtney Hansen was the co-host of the show until 2005, when she left the show to pursue other interests. She was replaced by Executive Producer Brutsman's wife Adrienne Janic ("AJ"). From Season 6 on, Jessi Combs, one of the early A-Team mechanics, returned and co-hosted as well as participated in the overhauls. Recently, Arianny Celeste had replaced Combs as Combs had moved on to another Velocity show, All Girls Garage. For two episodes of the eighth season and all of the truncated ninth season, Janic rejoined the show to co-host, and returned with Jacobs and Foose when the show was revived in 2019.

== Concept ==
The show's premise was that an unknowing "victim" – the mark, in the show's language — is nominated to be "Overhauled" by his or her family or friends, the insiders. The mark's car, usually an old and tired antique car, was obtained through some ruse. Some common examples included the car being "stolen" by Evans, Janic or Foose, a car being misplaced or lost at a mechanic's shop, or the car being towed away by "police."

An integral part of the show was when the two co-hosts play tricks on the unsuspecting mark, sometimes acting in roles of insurance adjusters or law enforcement agents, other times helping the insider, while Chip Foose and a team of mechanics – dubbed "The A-Team" – have a week to remake the car into a custom masterpiece. Each show ended with the surprise reuniting of owner and newly made-over car.

== Production ==
Each episode would take a significant amount of planning, starting with the producers reviewing the thousands of submissions from those wanting to have a friend's or family member's vehicle overhauled, selecting a deserving person, and setting everything in motion. Most builds would take place in Southern California, and true to the show's premise, the team would have only eight days to complete the build. Up to sixty people could be involved at any one time with the show. According to Associate Producer Jim Holloway, the show would assemble a team of seven or eight "A-Team" volunteer builders about four to five days before taping would start. The builders, who were usually masters of their craft, "work[ed] together... [with] a sense of camaraderie amongst them." Sometimes builders would leave the build, causing Chip Foose to request help from a friend or cohort to help the team finish. Holloway noted that "we couldn't do the show without the builders or our sponsors." The set would have the names and logos of various sponsors, many of whom often helped with the build.

Once the project was chosen and scheduled, the show's major sponsors would ship parts to the build facility in advance of the show, while other sponsors would maintain a small on-site inventory. This would allow such items as air-filter housings, tire sizes, and so on to be test fit without having to wait for shipments.

According to Holloway, each completed vehicle is worth around $150,000, but "in reality, they're priceless... Chip's so busy that it's almost impossible to get a car from the Foose shop, no matter how much money you've got." In an interview, Foose said that "for me, seeing the look on the owner's face is the most rewarding part of the show. It's almost overwhelming to see their response, and it's the whole reason I do it. We worked hard to make their dream come true."

== CNN's Warrior One ==
In 2006, the show remodeled a 1993 Hummer H1 that CNN used to cover the war in Iraq. Over a one-week period, the Overhaulin' crew replaced the engine, raised the vehicle's body and air brushed images of correspondents and troops onto the Hummer. They also added a DVD player, four televisions and a state-of-the-art sound system. TLC unveiled the revamped Hummer, named "Warrior One", in front of a group of fans, media and CNN employees. According to co-host Chris Jacobs, "we wanted to commemorate the journalists who risked their lives, and in some cases, gave their lives to tell the story of the war."

The vehicle was unveiled in CNN Center in Atlanta, and was sold in 2007 Barrett-Jackson Scottsdale auction for $1,000,000.00 in a Fisher House Foundation charity lot.

== Velocity revival ==
Velocity by Discovery renewed the show to help fill its programming schedule. Season 6 premiered on October 2, 2012 and concluded June 2, 2013. The revived show was produced by WATV Productions, who also produced two other Chip Foose–hosted series for Velocity, American Icon: The Hot Rod and American Icon: The Muscle Car. On October 12, 2015, a series finale was announced that a ninth season would be its last, consisting of four episodes.

=== Overhaulin' SEMA Edition 2012 ===
In this episode (Season 6, Episode 5), Chip Foose and his "A" Team customized a 2012 Chrysler 300 S with 5.7L HEMI V8 engine into Foose Velocity 300 in front of live 2012 SEMA Show audience. After the build, the project vehicle was given away in a lottery held during the event. An additional 300S replica was produced and given away at a later date.

== Series overview ==
Season	Episodes	Originally released	
Season	Episodes	First released	Last released
Specials	7	October 12, 2004	July 29, 2014
1	7	April 13, 2004	June 1, 2004
2	14 + 3(Specials)	July 13, 2004	March 17, 2005
3	27 + 1(Specials)	May 31, 2005	May 30, 2006
4	18 + 1(Specials)	June 20, 2006	December 26, 2006
5	8	April 24, 2008	June 26, 2008
6	12	October 2, 2012	June 2, 2013
7	9 + 2(Specials)	October 1, 2013	April 20, 2014
8	9	November 4, 2014	February 10, 2015
9	4	November 4, 2015	November 18, 2015
10	12	November 15, 2019	July 21, 2020

=== Specials ===
No. overall	No. in season	Title	Original release date
16	9 (in season 2)	"Coolest Cars, Best Pranks"	October 12, 2004
Moments from the first 12 episodes and updates on the cars and their owners.
17	10 (in season 2)	"Coolest Cars"	November 30, 2004
The team goes racing with six cars from previous episodes, a look back at the re-builds, and a check on the car owners and their new rides.
18	11 (in season 2)	"Live Strong (Lance Armstrong/Sheryl Crow)"	November 30, 2004
Championship cyclist Lance Armstrong's girlfriend, musician Sheryl Crow, gave him a stock 1970 Pontiac GTO convertible as a present after his 6th Tour de France victory.
38	14 (in season 3)	"Best of 2005"	December 20, 2005
Memorable moments of the 2005 season.
66	14 (in season 4)	"CNN Hummer Special (a.k.a. Warrior One)"	November 14, 2006
One of CNN's two Hummers – used by the journalists in Iraq – is chosen to get a special treatment. Once the rebuild is complete, the 1993 Hummer H1 dubbed "Warrior One" is taken back to Atlanta, where it is revealed on live television, and later auctioned off to help the families of injured war vets.
101	10 (in season 7)	"Vera's 1962 Porsche 356"	July 29, 2014
Insider Clyde has asked Chip and the A-Team to give his wife a special surprise, a new lease on life for her 1962 Porsche 356.
102	11 (in season 7)	"Top 10 Moments"	July 29, 2014

=== Season 1 ===
No. overall	No. in season	Title	Original release date
1	1	"Parts Guy"	April 27, 2004
Jeff works at a car parts shop. His boss, Tony, lends Jeff's 1971 Chevy Chevelle to a shifty production company that's shooting an infomercial... and accidentally "loses" the car.
2	2	"Search & Rescue"	April 13, 2004
In the first episode, automobile designer Chip Foose and his Overhaulin' team snatch and overhaul a 1988 Chevy truck. The owner of the truck is Matt, a straight-A student who's training for a career in Search and Rescue. The truck holds special sentimental value for him because it used to belong to his grandfather.
3	3	"Museum Worthy"	April 20, 2004
Chuck is led to believe that his stock 1950 Ford he loaned to The Petersen Museum has been stolen.
4	4	"Surfer Kid"	May 4, 2004
Mylan's parents Vicki and Tim arrange his rusty 1977 El Camino to be impounded. While the car is being re-built, surfer Tyler Hatzikian creates custom surf boards to go with Mylan's new "surf wagon".
5	5	"Beverly Hills Camaro (a.k.a. 902 – Merlot)"	May 11, 2004
Ian Ziering (of Beverly Hills, 90210) is duped into believing that his 1968 Camaro is at a shop that's going bankrupt. In reality, his car is being overhauled for a week at American Muscle Cars.
6	6	"School's Out"	May 18, 2004
Dale works at a foundation that secures funding and donated cars for Wyoming Tech. One of the project cars, a 1956 Chevy Bel Air, is "stolen". While Dale's led to believe that the car's been spotted crossing state lines on its way to a chop shop, over 30 WyoTech students with the Overhaulin' team rebuild the car to be the school's new mascot.
7	7	"Lucky Star"	June 1, 2004
Cassie is an 18-year-old bank teller who drives a very boring '91 Ford Explorer. Her Aunt Barbara and Uncle Mike sabotage the car so that it gets sent to the Overhaulin' team for a re-build and re-invention.

=== Season 2 ===
No. overall	No. in season	Title	Original release date
8	1	"Moving Day (a.k.a. Body Off)"	July 13, 2004
The team poses as movers to clean out Connie and Pete Eastman's garage. Insider Pete signed up his wife's car, a beaten-up 1964 Corvette, to be re-built, but gets a surprise when the "movers" also take his 1971 VW "Thing".
9	2	"Cherry Nova"	July 20, 2004
Katy is told that her worn and beaten 1967 Chevy Nova is "accidentally" towed away by the city. For a week, she tries to get her car back from the tow operator (co-host Chris) – who's constantly asking her out on a date! – while the team with the help of three insiders (Katy's mother, brother, and roommate) re-builds her car.
10	3	"The 4-4 New"	July 27, 2004
Chris is surprised when his neighbor Scott has asked the A-team to overhaul Chris's favorite and beloved 1968 Oldsmobile that he has had for over 24 years.
11	4	"The Monte Fuego"	August 3, 2004
After waiting more than 30 years, Rayce inherited his 1970 Monte Carlo from his father, who bought the 8-cylinder muscle car new. Rayce has many fond memories of the car. It has become a family heirloom and he plans to pass it down to his son, Rayce Jr.
12	5	"Dude, Where's My Skylark?"	August 10, 2004
Rick's 1967 Buick Skylark gets stolen. His older brother Robert, an Iraqi war vet, works as the insider and convinces Rick that his car got snatched because of a personal vendetta.
13	6	"Rustang"	August 29, 2004
While tennis instructor Mark is giving a lesson to co-host Courtney, his wife and daughter help the A-team steal his rust-bucket of a car, a 1965 Mustang. Later he is told that the car has been stripped for parts.
14	7	"Blue Bird (a.k.a. The Falcon and The Snow-Job)"	September 21, 2004
Travis, a young man who wants to be a cop like his mother, is duped into thinking his '63 Ford Falcon has been stolen by con artists. Not only does the team re-build his car but Travis also gets to play cop in a staged sting operation to catch the cons.
15	8	"Challenging Mopar"	September 28, 2004
James' 1971 Dodge Challenger, a graduation present from his father, is stolen and James is required to take part in an undercover operation to expose the crooks.
16	9	"SEMA Gambler (a.k.a. Gambler 514)"	December 14, 2004
Insider Brent tells his father Brad that he has lost Brad's much-loved 1970 Mustang to cover his gambling debts. What really happens is that the team re-builds the car in the center of the 2004 SEMA show, one of the world's biggest conventions for auto parts and specialty equipment.
17	10	"Twins Bel Air (a.k.a. California Performance Bel Air)"	December 16, 2004
Glenn, a teacher for special-needs kids and the father of young twins, lends his car to Hot Rod Magazine publisher Ira Gabriel to be used to shoot a music video.
18	11	"52 Pickup (a.k.a. Butterscorched)"	December 21, 2004
John has a 1952 GMC truck that gets taken away by a made-up organization called "Charitable Donation Foundation". While John tries to recover his supposedly "donated" car, the team re-builds the classic to its former glory.
19	12	"College Girl's Camaro (a.k.a. Thievin' Teacher)"	February 3, 2005
Insider Dennis works as an auto shop teacher at Citrus Community College. One of his students, Nicole, is this week's duped car owner as Dennis poses as the car thief who took Nicole's 1970 Camaro.
20	13	"Doublehaulin'"	March 8, 2005
Chip Foose and his team make over two cars, a 1998 Mazda pick-up truck and a '68 Chevy Chevelle, for a pair of twin sisters who are back home from college for the holidays.
21	14	"Soldier's Ride"	March 17, 2005
Frankie Jr., a vet of the Iraqi war vet, has a project with his father Frank Sr. re-building a 1966 Chevy Chevelle. Frankie's parents act as the insiders when the car is supposedly stolen and later impounded.

=== Season 3 ===
No. overall	No. in season	Title	Original release date
25	1	"Tuner Car"	May 31, 2005
Dylan is fooled into thinking that his 1995 Honda Civic has been taken by the IRS due to tax issues.
26	2	"Wiley & The Road Runner"	July 19, 2005
John has owned three Plymouth Road Runners in his life. When his current one, a rare 1969 convertible, is "stolen" and John is accused of insurance fraud, he gets desperate to get the car back.
27	3	"The Mad Kidney Donor"	July 26, 2005
Jason's friend Willy – to whom Jason once donated one of his kidneys – convinces him to take his 1995 Chevy Tahoe to a shop for a free service Willy has arranged. However, when he goes to retrieve the car, he is told he cannot get the Tahoe back without full payment.
28	4	"Bel Air BBQ"	August 2, 2005
Tyson has been taking auto shop classes to re-build his 1956 Chevrolet Bel Air. The Overhaulin' team discover that the car so badly rusted they have to find a replacement. Meanwhile, Tyson is told that his car has been stolen and vandalized, and the pranksters keep sending him spare parts as proof.
29	5	"Illegal Fowl"	August 16, 2005
Deputy Sheriff Mike's 1965 T-bird used to belong to his father. His wife, Stephanie, is the insider as the pranksters act as tow operators who "misplace" the car for a week while it is being overhauled.
30	6	"One Ugly Horse"	August 23, 2005
While Mike's '67 Mustang is being overhauled, he is fooled into thinking that his friend Tom, who owns an auto shop and has worked on the Mustang several times, runs an illegal operation to make cars disappear.
31	7	"Snaked"	September 27, 2005
The Overhaulin' team tackles something unusual for them: a new car, Ana's 2005 Ford Mustang.
32	8	"U.S. Navy Steal"	October 4, 2005
John is a former Navy SEAL who owns a 1965 Ford pickup. The car means so much to him that he has even named it Mitch after a dead friend. The irreplaceable car has been "stolen" from the shop in which it was being serviced.
33	9	"Clean LeMans"	October 11, 2005
Chip Foose poses as a homeless man to bum a dollar from Frederick... and then steals his car. While his rusty 1968 Pontiac LeMans is being overhauled, Frederick is told that his car has been confiscated by the Environmental Protection Agency.
34	10	"Nova-Caine"	October 18, 2005
Gabriel is a cheerful and funny guy who makes friends wherever he goes. After Gabriel's 1970 Chevy Nova daily driver was stolen, his wife Christine would love to surprise him with a cool hot rod.
35	11	"Customs"	October 25, 2005
As a child, Martin secretly loved his father's 1965 Chevy Impala and was crushed when it was sold. Martin's father bought it back, and Martin still dreams of fixing it up and driving his family around in style.
36	12	"Firey Brit"	November 1, 2005
Andrew and Johanna met on vacation; at the time she only had three months to live. Now, years later, the two are happily married, and Andrew wants to make-over Johanna's beloved 2005 Dodge Magnum to celebrate her life and all of her accomplishments.
37	13	"The Biggest Beater in America"	December 13, 2005
Our Overhaulin' judges will select the biggest beater in America and then ask viewers to submit suggestions online for how best to transform the vehicle. And voila! One lucky winner gets a Chip Foose custom car makeover. 1931 Model A Pickup named "Little Sassy" in Modesto, 1971 Chevy Camaro in Dallas and 1969 AMC AMX in Chicago. The winner of the makeover is the 1971 Chevy Camaro.
39	15	"Desperate Impound"	January 10, 2006
Sharon got her 1967 Pontiac GTO in 1979 for $1200, and she and her grandfather used to work on it together. When he died, she stopped driving the car. Sharon is now busy with two children, and her husband says it is time for her to get the attention she deserves.
40	16	"Neighborhood Watching"	January 17, 2006
When Dennis moved to LA 15 years ago, he bought his dream daily driver 1969 Pontiac Firebird convertible with his last $4000. His girlfriend says that he is so attached; they will probably have to bury him with the car.
41	17	"Overlord"	January 24, 2006
The Overhaulin' team has pulled off the ultimate prank: stealing Chip Foose's beloved '56 Ford (F100) truck right out from under his nose and overhauled it over the course of four months! A new side of Chip is revealed as the prankster gets pranked!
42	18	"That 70's Van"	January 31, 2006
Back in 1976, he bought his Chevy van brand new and adored it. Today, he focuses on family and friends and has put the van aside. He is always quick to help family and friends, so his daughter thinks it is about time that they did something special for him.
43	19	"Leno's Heist"	February 7, 2006
When Jay Leno found out that his part-time mechanic and friend, Dave Killackey and his 1956 Chevy Nomad were in dire need of help – but couldn't afford the expense himself, he turned to the dynamic Overhaulin' team to make Dave's dream come true.
44	20	"SEMA (a.k.a. The SEMA Show, or 67 Charger)"	February 28, 2006
When a thief mistakenly killed Merrick's father seven years ago, Merrick inherited his father's prized possession, the 1967 Dodge Charger. Merrick cannot afford to fix up the car alone – so the Overhaulin' crew arrives to save it from the junkyard.
45	21	"Overtime"	March 7, 2006
Matt loves his 1930 Model A Ford but doesn't have the time to give it the love and attention it needs. More specifically, among many other things – this classic car has 1987 Mazda engine in it! Foose and the Overhaulin' team to the rescue!
46	22	"Got GTO?"	March 28, 2006
A tragic accident caused Richard to be paralyzed from the waist down. Since his injury, Richard has worked to motivate others and wants to become a social worker. But the 1969 Pontiac GTO he has always dreamed about fixing up sits in the driveway untouched.
47	23	"Napa Doublehaulin' (a.k.a. Double Trouble)"	April 4, 2006
Daryline is a model NAPA Auto Parts employee – and both her husband, Willy, and her boss, George think that no one is more deserving of an overhauling of her Camino than Daryline. 1967 El Camino + 2003 Chevy S10
48	24	"Lowrider Girl"	April 11, 2006
Noemi has dreamed about her perfect 1964 Chevy Impala forever, but doesn't have enough money to fix it up. Her husband turns to Overhaulin' to help him give Noemi her dream car.
49	25	"Photo Shoot Fiasco"	April 18, 2006
Miles and Chrissy both lost their fathers within 3 weeks of each other, Chrissy's father left the 1968 Ford Bronco to Miles in his will. Miles views this car as a symbol and tribute to both fathers and wants to restore the Bronco to its original beauty.
50	26	"Uncle Sam's Nephew"	April 25, 2006
David never had enough saved to fix up his 1968 Pontiac Firebird. After high school, he joined the Marines and served three times in Iraq and Afghanistan.
51	27	"Overhaulin' Truck"	May 2, 2006
Chip Foose overhauls Alonzo's 1970 Chevy truck.
52	28	"Hot Head"	May 30, 2006
Mark's best childhood memories were riding around in his father's 1972 Oldsmobile Cutlass. Now Mark is struggling to take care of his family and cannot afford to fix it up enough to take it out of the garage.

=== Season 4 ===
No. overall	No. in season	Title	Original release date
53	1	"Mean Anemul"	June 20, 2006
During the eight years Manuel has owned his rare 1968 Oldsmobile 442 convertible, he has paid thousands of dollars to various mechanics who have never actually done any proper work on the car.
54	2	"LeMama's Boy"	June 27, 2006
Tony is too embarrassed to drive his 1966 Pontiac LeMans because it is not reliable among other things.
55	3	"Spaced Out"	July 4, 2006
Jamie put aside all of his own needs to take care of his ailing mother and grandparents. His beloved 1967 Ford Galaxie took a back seat and is now in terrible shape.
56	4	"Overhaulin' Bling (a.k.a. BLING!)"	July 18, 2006
A construction worker gets his 1996 Chevy Tahoe Overhauled. His girlfriend is the insider.
57	5	"Junk in the Truck"	July 25, 2006
Marilyn owns a 1956 Cadillac convertible (Series 62), named "Bessie", but it is in desperate need of repair.
58	6	"Chip & Chris Flipped"	August 8, 2006
When Lowell purchased a 1967 Dodge Coronet 440, he planned to restore it, but ended up taking an early retirement and hoped to sell the Coronet for a profit. His son Geoff wants to save the money to restore the car himself, so Lowell called for help.
59	7	"Chip & AJ Trading Places"	August 15, 2006
Michelle and Megan are more like sisters than mother-and-daughter. Megan's good grades earned her money for a car, and she got a good deal on a 1963 Mercury Comet, but she needs more money to have work done on the car.
60	8	"All in the Family"	August 29, 2006
Isaias loves his father's 1967 Dodge A-100 truck. Isaias's father died from cancer in 2002. He hopes to, one day, drive it with his own son. His wife says that he will "cry his eyes out" once he finds out that he is on Overhaulin'.
61	9	"Hot for Teacher (a.k.a. Hottie Teacher)"	September 5, 2006
Melissa was voted "Hottest Teacher" at the high school where she teaches. Her students say that she is attentive and makes learning exciting. Her husband says that she is a total gear-head and cannot wait for her to see her fixed up 1964 Chevy Malibu SS.
62	10	"Roadies Stole My 'Vette!"	September 19, 2006
Chip and prankster Rob dress up as unemployed roadies, who break into Carl's garage and steal his 1957 Chevy Corvette. While the car's being rebuilt, Carl meets "Detective McCool" (prankster Greg), who's not working really hard to get the car back.
63	11	"Juvenile Delinquent"	September 26, 2006
Tanner wants to surprise his father Wade by getting his project car, a 1967 Chevy Chevelle, fixed up.
64	12	"Mötley Crüiser"	October 31, 2006
Randy is friends with rock star Vince Neil. Now Randy's rusty 1969 Buick GS (Grand Sport) 400 convertible gets restored to its former glory.
65	13	"Pop Star Steal"	November 7, 2006
Pop singer Nick Lachey acts as the insider to heist his brother Drew's 1967 Ford F100 truck.
67	15	"The BOSS is Back"	November 21, 2006
Hector is a school teacher and a big fan of the show. To throw him off scent, the team had to "steal" two of his cars. While his 1970 Ford Mustang Boss 302 is being worked on, Hector is led to believe that one of his former students is the thief. The owner later sold the car after it aired.
68	16	"Overhaulin' Bumrush"	November 28, 2006
The team takes a break from the usual routine of duping the mark. Instead, this time Dominick has been told in advance that his car will get the Overhaulin' treatment. He has come up with a wish list of things he would want the team to work on in his 1970 Monte Carlo.
69	17	"SEMA Show"	December 5, 2006
Dan, his wife Kelly and son Mike are all MOPAR enthusiasts. Dan's told that Mike lost his 1972 Dodge Challenger in a street race while in reality the car is being re-built before the crowds in the 2006 SEMA show in Las Vegas.
70	18	"The Short Yellow Bus"	December 19, 2006
John Force is a drag racing legend and the star of Driving Force reality show. He also dedicates a lot of his time to children's charities, and has recently bought a little yellow 1956 Ford School Bus with which he intends to drive kids to school events.
71	19	"Mustang Sting"	December 26, 2006
Dave side-swiped his 1969 Ford Mustang but didn't have the money to fix it up right so it just sits in the garage. Dave's father steps up and gets Dave the overhaulin' that he deserves.

=== Season 5 ===
No. overall	No. in season	Title	Original release date
72	1	"Brushtang"	April 24, 2008
Matt's plans for restoring his prized 1965 Ford Mustang Coupe were sidelined when his sick brother moved in, but with the help of Chip and the A-Team the classic gets a second chance to shine.
73	2	"Family Truckster"	May 1, 2008
George is the proud owner of a 1971 Chevy 3/4 Ton Pickup Truck passed down to him by his beloved Father-in-law Herb. To honor his memory, George's wife Kathy thought the truck should be restored to its former glory by none other than the Overhaulin' team.
74	3	"Wake Up Call"	May 8, 2008
After his father's tragic death, Harrison lost interest in restoring the 1963 Chevy Nova they had been working on together. Fortunately, a good friend contacted Chip and the team and asked them to finish the car Overhaulin' style.
75	4	"Scout's Honor"	May 22, 2008
Jim's 1956 Chevy BelAir convertible has languished in his driveway since his senior year of high school. Since Jim is too busy to give it the necessary attention, his son Danny contacted the Overhaulin' crew to restore the car to its former glory.
76	5	"Number 1 Camaro"	June 5, 2008
Sandy and Ken's 1967 Chevy Camaro is a forgotten family heirloom. After her father's death, Sandy contacted Chip and the team to restore the car to its original luster. She wants it to capture the spirit of the family patriarch.
77	6	"That's All, Volks!"	June 12, 2008
Like all VW fanatics, Hot Dog Fred has nothing but love for his old 1965 VW 21-Window Microbus (Type II T1). After Chip and the A-team work their magic, he might just fall in love all over again.
78	7	"SEMA – Radical Roadster"	June 19, 2008
In the midst of SEMA – the world's biggest car show – Chip Foose and the A-Team turn a 1954 Ford Customline dog of a car into a 21st-century superstar.
79	8	"The Marks Return – Chip's Picks"	June 26, 2008
Best-of episode review including: Tony's 1966 LeMans S04E02, Chris's 1968 Oldsmobile 442 S02E03, Deputy Sheriff Mike's 1965 Ford Thunderbird S03E05, Wade's (and Tanner's)1967 Chevy Chevelle S04E11, John's 1969 Plymouth Roadrunner convertible S03E02, David's 1956 Chevy Nomad S03E18 and lastly Chip Foose's own 1956 Ford Pickup (F100) S03E16.

=== Season 6 ===
No. overall	No. in season	Title	Original release date
80	1	"Carlos Gusman's 1965 Impala"	October 2, 2012
In the sixth-season premiere, a 1965 Chevy Impala is restored for a Marine Corps vet.
81	2	"Chuck Schafer's 1954 Pickup"	October 9, 2012
A 1954 Chevy 3100 pickup truck is restored for a retired teacher who is paying for his twin daughters college tuition instead of restoring his family heirloom.
82	3	"Bernie Federman's 1967 Camaro"	October 16, 2012
Chip and the team restore a 1967 Chevy Camaro for a man who misjudged his ability to complete the project himself.
83	4	"Blake Hamilton's 1965 VW Bug"	October 23, 2012
A 1965 Volkswagen Bug is deemed unrepairable due to missing chassis and bad floor damage, so a 1967 Volkswagen bug is found from a salvage yard and is restored by Chip and his team for a young mechanic with cystic fibrosis and needing a lung transplant.
84	5	"SEMA Special Chrysler 300"	December 4, 2012
A new 2012 Chrysler 300 S HEMI is customized by Chip and his team in front of a live audience at SEMA and given away via raffle at the show. Chip changed model name to 300 V (for Velocity).
85	6	"Rick Fontana's 1967 Ford Mustang Convertible"	April 15, 2013
Rick's 1967 Ford Mustang convertible, his first car, is in desperate need of help. Chip and the A-team are up for the challenge!
86	7	"Chris White's 1970 Chevrolet El Camino"	April 22, 2013
While serving in the military, Chris' 1970 Chevy El Camino laid in disrepair.
87	8	"Roger Webb's 1964 Plymouth Fury"	April 29, 2013
A 1964 Plymouth Fury has been Rodger's dream car ever since he was a kid. Despite finally owning one, his duties to his family and community have stalled restoration plans. Now Chip and the A-team give back to a worthy fan.
88	9	"David Currier's 1964 Oldsmobile Dynamic 88"	May 6, 2013
A full-time father and military search & rescue instructor cannot devote the time necessary to properly maintain his 1964 Oldsmobile Dynamic 88. Revealed in beautiful offsite in beautiful Coronado Island in San Diego, CA.
89	10	"Brian Webb's 1965 Malibu"	May 19, 2013
A middle-school teacher whose first vehicle was a 1965 Chevy Malibu SS uses muscle cars to stimulate the young minds in his classroom.
90	11	"John Nivens' 1972 Lotus Europa, Part 1"	May 26, 2013
This 1972 Lotus Europa was nominated by Jay Leno to be Overhauled for John, who delivers soda every weekend to Leno's Big Dog Garage. His children's tuition and college expenses prevent John from repairing the Europa.
91	12	"John Nivens' 1972 Lotus Europa, Part 2"	June 2, 2013

=== Season 7 ===
No. overall	No. in season	Title	Original release date
92	1	"Sarah's Skylark"	October 1, 2013
Chip and the A-team design and overhaul Sarah's first car, a 1965 Buick Skylark Convertible. Sarah is a hardworking mother and Sunday school teacher. The Buick was a birthday gift from her father. She bonded with her father by working on it in high school.
93	2	"Bill's 1965 Mustang Fastback"	October 8, 2013
Chip and the A-team design and transform Bill Garrett's 1965 Mustang Fastback into a Shelby style stunner. His dream of restoring his Mustang faded when thieves stole all the tools and parts he would collected.
94	3	"Scott's 1967 Chevy Pickup Truck"	October 15, 2013
Chip and the A-team design and overhaul Scott Hardison's 1967 Chevrolet C10 Pick up truck. Scott did not have the time or resources to restore his truck, a family heirloom once owned by his grandfather and father before they died.
95	4	"Victor's 1967 Ford Bronco"	October 22, 2013
Chip and the A-team design and overhaul Fireman-Paramedic Victor Lopez's 1967 Ford Bronco. His dream is to share his Bronco and love of the outdoors with his three young children.
96	5	"Efrain's Olds 442"	March 23, 2014
Owner is Efrain Nieto, the manager of Huntington Beach Togos/Baskin Robbins. Efrain is known as a generous hard working guy who never says no to anyone in need. He never asks for anything, just quietly pitches in and helps everyone. This episode the A-Team helps his 1970 Oldsmobile 442
97	6	"Ricky's New Impala"	March 30, 2014
Chip Foose and the A-Team customize a new 2014 Chevy Impala for Ricky Thibeault, an active duty U.S. Navy Explosives Ordnance Technician (EOD), who specializes in underwater bomb disposal. Ricky's been in the Navy for 17 years, and is Chip Foose and Overhaulin's #1 fan. Originally planned to overhaul a 1979 Chevy Monte Carlo, but was decided it was already too finished.
98	7	"Lanny's 67 Ford Fairlane GTA"	April 6, 2014
A water district sanitation technician dreams of fixing up the 1967 Ford Fairlane GTA that he purchased from the vehicle's original owner 16 years earlier.
99	8	"Roger's '61 Impala Bubble Top"	April 13, 2014
Owner is Roger Buchanan, a semi-retired former Chevy restoration parts store owner who bleeds motor oil. Roger is a true car guy, who will sit in a non-runner just to hang out with the car and drink his coffee. 1961 Chevy Impala Bubble Top 409.
100	9	"Josh's '63 Nova"	April 20, 2014
His growing family is the most important part of Air Force veteran Josh Ingram's life. He has always wanted a classic 1963 Chevrolet Nova project car to work on and share with his grandfather, but fixing up the rusted old relic he found takes more time and money than he has.
101	10	"Vera's 1962 Porsche 356"	July 29, 2014
Insider Clyde knows his wife Vera wants nothing more than to help others. So he has asked Chip and the A-Team to give her a special surprise, a new lease on life for her 1962 Porsche 356.
102	11	"Top 10 Moments"	July 29, 2014
Little can be found on this episode

=== Season 8 ===
No. overall	No. in season	Title	Original release date
103	1	"Jim's 1965 Sunbeam Tiger"	November 4, 2014
Chip and the A-team design and overhaul a 1965 Sunbeam Tiger for Jim, a highschool teacher.
104	2	"Tony's 1966 A100 Van"	November 11, 2014
Chip and the A-team design and transform Tony's 1966 Dodge A100 Van.
105	3	"John's 1969 AMC AMX"	November 18, 2014
Chip and the A-team design and overhaul John's 1969 AMC AMX.
106	4	"Dan's 1967 Pontiac Firebird"	November 25, 2014
Chip and the A-team design and overhaul Dan's 1967 Pontiac Firebird
107	5	"Scott's 1963 Cadillac El Dorado"	December 2, 2014
Chip and the A-team design and overhaul Scott's 1963 Cadillac El Dorado
108	6	"Dougs 1955 Ford Thunderbird"	January 20, 2015
Chip and the A-team design and overhaul Dougs 1955 Ford Thunderbird
109	7	"Cathlenes 1970 Plymouth Barracuda"	January 27, 2015
Chip and the A-team design and overhaul Cathlenes 1970 Plymouth Barracuda
110	8	"James 1968 Mercury Cougar"	February 3, 2015
Chip and the A-team design and overhaul James 1968 Mercury Cougar
111	9	"Gregs 1957 Bel Air"	February 10, 2015
Chip and the A-team design and overhaul Gregs 1957 Chevy Bel Air (Live at SEMA)

=== Season 9 ===
No. overall	No. in season	Title	Original release date
112	1	"In Too Depp"	November 4, 2015
The team take on Amber Heard's 1967 Ford Mustang with help from Johnny Depp.
113	2	"Elco That's All Go"	November 4, 2015
The team fix up a 1982 Chevy El Camino
114	3	"Lone Survivor"	November 11, 2015
The team build a 1967 Ford Mustang for a former Navy Seal.
115	4	"Foose and the Bandit"	November 18, 2015
Tom's 1978 Pontiac Firebird Trans-Am

=== Season 10 ===
No. overall	No. in season	Title	Original release date
116	1	"The Knock Out Vette"	November 15, 2019
A one-time heavy-metal singer Glen May of Tyrant has turned in his microphone for a life focused on family. Over time, he scraped together enough to buy a 2014 Chevy Corvette Stingray. Now, his son wants him to stop settling for less and get the metal makeover his Stingray deserves.
117	2	"Shelby Shenanigans (AKA Shelby Daytona)"	November 23, 2019
Marissa's Shelby Daytona replica is her prized possession. After years of family struggle, she has made a clean break and started over, so Chip and the team undertake a fitting transformation of her heritage race car.
118	3	"Family Ford Foosified (AKA Ford Lightning)"	November 30, 2019
A hard-working father and devoted husband loves his 2002 Ford F-150 Lightning, but his family has always been his first priority. The team give the Ford a makeover.
119	4	"ZL One-off"	December 7, 2019
A woman's most cherished memories revolve around long drives with her father in his '69 Camaro. After he died, she kept her family's passion for muscle cars alive by buying her own 2015 Chevy Camaro.
120	5	"Mustangs and Camels"	December 14, 2019
A decorated 15-year Navy veteran felt unappreciated when she returned from overseas. Her partner Geno helped her buy a 2016 Mustang convertible to show her how much she is valued, but in his heart, he knew it was less than she deserved.
121	6	"Land Cruisin' for a Bruisin'"	December 21, 2019
A devoted father and off-road enthusiast always dreamed of having a perfect classic Land Cruiser, but his focus on family kept him and his 1970 Toyota Land Cruiser FJ40 off the trail. Now, his wife wants to give back to the man who gave so much.
122	7	"Challenging Challenger"	December 28, 2019
A cancer survivor treats his 2010 Dodge Challenger like a priceless relic, with a garage that's a shrine to Mopar. He bought the car used, but it wasn't all he imagined, so now his wife has called in Chip to give his ride a makeover.
123	8	"Off-Road Masterpiece"	January 18, 2020
A woman from a family of Jeep lovers bought a 2013 Jeep Wrangler Unlimited Sahara of her own on a whim, and it showed up looking a little worse for wear. Her father puts in a call to Chip and the guys, hoping to make his daughter's Jeep a backwoods beast.
124	9	"Rally-Wreck, Reborn"	January 25, 2020
A young rally-car fan works with his father to get his 2006 Subaru WRX running.
125	10	"Olderhaulin"	February 1, 2020
A military vet and Mustang devotee finally splurged to buy himself a 2016 Ford Mustang Shelby GT350, though the previous owners' sketchy upgrades made this pony look more like a mule. His wife wants him to have a Shelby worthy of the highest honors.
126	11	"Daily Raptor"	February 5, 2020
A small business owner with a passion for off-road Fords has daily driver/work truck with over 150 thousand miles. So his best friend sent in an application to Overhaulin and now Chip and the A-team are reinventing his 2013 Ford F-150 Raptor SVT pickup truck.
127	12	"Shaq's Classic"	February 12, 2020
Shaquille O'Neal heart is always in helping out the little guy and making those around him happy. His friend Anthony "Chicago" Hall wants to give back to a man who gives so much by fixing up Shaq's rust bucket 1964 Chevy Impala convertible.
