= Speed It Up =

2019 single by Gunna

Single by Gunna

from the album Drip or Drown 2
- Released: February 11, 2019
- Genre: Trap
- Length: 2:59
- Label: YSL; 300
- Songwriters: Sergio Kitchens; Chandler Durham
- Producer: Turbo

Gunna singles chronology
"One Call" (2019)	"Speed It Up" (2019)	"AMG" (2019)

"Speed It Up" is a song by American rapper Gunna, released on February 11, 2019 as the second single from his debut studio album Drip or Drown 2 (2019). It was produced by Turbo.

== Composition ==
The song finds Gunna melodically rapping about his luxuries such as private planes, diamond chains and expensive clothes, over a beat with heavy bass and described as "very mellow, almost monotone".

== Critical reception ==
Alex Zidel of HotNewHipHop wrote "There are few string elements to 'Speed It Up' but Gunna still shows up to do his thing. The beat is nice and although it may take some people a while to get warmed up to Gunna's reserved flows here, we're confident it will be more of a grower." Austin Boykins of Hypebeast stated "Gunna appropriately floats over the Turbo-produced track thanks to his melodic bounce that he's also displayed on some of his featured tracks such as Travis Scott's 'Yosemite' and 'Drip Too Hard' alongside Lil Baby." Alphonse Pierre of Pitchfork remarked "Like most Gunna songs, 'Speed It Up' is lyrically uncomplicated, but he uses a stop-start delivery that instantly implants every line into your brain. The Turbo beat like—Gunna's personality—is smooth, simple, and quiet. And Gunna has shamelessly lost interest in all topics that have nothing to do with designer clothing. Every verse feels like a weekly Gunna wardrobe update, one I endlessly look forward to".

== Charts ==
Chart (2019)	Peak position
Canada (Canadian Hot 100)	96
US Billboard Hot 100	91
US Hot R&B/Hip-Hop Songs (Billboard)	43

== Certifications ==
Region	Certification	Certified units/sales
United States (RIAA)	Gold	500,000^{‡}
^{‡} Sales+streaming figures based on certification alone.
