= Wunna (album) =

- Standard cover; deluxe edition features a green ambience and Gunna is smiling

Studio album by Gunna
- Released: May 22, 2020
- Recorded: 2019–2020
- Genre: Hip-hop
- Length: 50:06
- Labels: YSL; 300
- Producers: Alex Lustig; Aviator Keyyz; Bobby Raps; Dunk Rock; Fizzle; Frankie Bash; Grayson Beatz; Heavy Mellow; Jasper Harris; Justin Glass; Kenny Stuntin; Mike Will Made It; Millz; Morgan O'Connor; Myles Harris; Nik D; Outtatown; Oz; Pi'erre Bourne; Pro Logic; Psymun; Rex Kudo; Sebastian; Taurus; Tre Pounds; Turbo; Wheezy; Young Twix

Gunna chronology
Drip or Drown 2 (2019)	Wunna (2020)	Slime Language 2 (2021)

Singles from Wunna
- 1. "Skybox" Released: March 6, 2020; 2. "Wunna" Released: May 18, 2020; 3. "Dollaz on My Head" Released: July 6, 2020

Wunna (stylized in all caps) is the second studio album by American rapper Gunna. It was released on May 22, 2020, by YSL Records and 300 Entertainment. The album features guest appearances from Young Thug, Nechie, Lil Baby, Roddy Ricch, and Travis Scott. A deluxe edition was released on July 24, 2020, featuring additional guest appearances from Yak Gotti, Future, Nav, and Lil Uzi Vert.

Wunna received generally favorable reviews from critics and debuted atop the US Billboard 200, earning 111,000 album-equivalent units of which 4,000 were pure sales, becoming Gunna's first number-one album. It was supported by three singles: "Skybox", its title track, "Wunna", and "Dollaz on My Head".

== Background ==
In September 2019, Gunna first announced that he would be dropping new music "very, very soon". Throughout January and February 2020, the rapper kept hinting at the release of new music which was eventually followed up by the single release "Skybox". On March 17, 2020, he explained on his Twitter that the album title stands for "Wealthy Unapologetic Nigga Naturally Authentic". In April 2020, the rapper revealed that the album was supposed to be out already by that date but the COVID-19 pandemic interfered with his plans. He announced the release date on April 30. On May 18, a video for the title track "Wunna" was released. The video was shot in Jamaica and serves as the first part of an upcoming album documentary. Gunna previously teased the song in March 2020.

== Singles ==
The album's first single, "Skybox", was released on March 6, 2020, as well an accompanying music video. The song peaked at number 65 on the US Billboard Hot 100.

The album's second single, "Wunna", was released on May 18, 2020, while the music video was released the next day. The song peaked at number 57 on the Billboard Hot 100.

The album's third single, "Dollaz on My Head" featuring Young Thug, was sent to rhythmic contemporary radio on July 6, 2020. The song peaked at number 38 on the Billboard Hot 100.

== Critical reception ==
Professional ratings
Aggregate scores
Source	Rating
Metacritic	67/100
Review scores
Source	Rating
AllMusic	3/5 stars
Beats Per Minute	24%
HipHopDX	3.7/5
Pitchfork	7.2/10
Rolling Stone	3.5/5 stars
Slant Magazine	3.5/5 stars

Wunna was met with generally favorable reviews. At Metacritic, which assigns a normalized rating out of 100 to reviews from professional publications, the album received an average score of 67, based on six reviews.

Pitchfork's reviewer Alphonse Pierre gave the album a positive review, stating that "Gunna has the heart and is the most engaged he's sounded since his 2018 breakthrough, Drip Season 3". While calling the album monotonous at times, Pierre commended Gunna's performances, saying that "it's hard to not have fun when Gunna is telling posh tales in a rushed melody over Wheezy and Turbo beats that sound like an elevator ride up to a penthouse". Reviewing the album for HipHopDX, Mimi Kenny stated "Gunna received invaluable support on his way to fame, but with Wunna, it looks like he may be able to take it from here". Danny Schwartz of Rolling Stone praised the album, stating, "While some of his writing is of the Fisher-Price variety—one verse in "Met Gala" employs a AAAAAAAAAAAAAAA rhyme scheme—and his lyrics aren't always well thought out ("Say the wrong word, and I'mma shoot him in his shit"), Wunna remains a transportive listening experience, due in large part to its production, which exists in almost perfect harmony with Gunna's soothing vocals". Charles Lyons-Burt of Slant Magazine said, "The album represents an evolution from trap easy-listening to big-canvas rap artistry".

In a mixed review, AllMusic critic David Crone wrote the following: "While WUNNA deserves points for its cohesiveness and impressive highs, its padding proves its downfall: the album's closing run means it remains a pick-and-mix affair, rather than a definitive statement." In a negative review, Beats Per Minute's Chase McMullen stated: "Should you desire to be kind, you can call the album mood music. In theory, it's an astrology themed LP, with Wunna representing an alter-ego, but none of that comes across. ... Even his voice lacks any distinction, a hushed, fatigued monotone that could belong to anyone, with so little presence that it hardly registers over the beats."

=== Year-end lists ===
Select year-end rankings of Wunna
Publication	List	Rank	Ref.
Billboard	The 20 Best Rap Albums of 2020	19	
Complex	The Best Albums of 2020	14	
Highsnobiety	The 20 Albums That Saved 2020	20	
Uproxx	The Best Albums of 2020	34	
Vulture	The Best Albums of 2020	9	

== Commercial performance ==
Wunna debuted at number one on the US Billboard 200 chart, earning 111,000 album-equivalent units, (of which 4,000 were in pure album sales) in its first week. This became Gunna's first US number one debut. The album also accumulated a total of 143.6 million on-demand streams of the set's tracks in the week ending May 28. In its second week, the album dropped to number four on the chart, earning an additional 49,000 units.

== Track listing ==
Wunna track listing
No.	Title	Writer(s)	Producer(s)	Length
1.	"Argentina"	Sergio Kitchens; Kenneth Gilmore; Wesley Glass	Wheezy; Morgan O'Connor; Frankie Bash	2:29
2.	"Gimmick"	Kitchens; Glass; Gilmore	Wheezy; Aviator Keyyz; Millz	2:09
3.	"MOTW"	Kitchens; Glass	Wheezy; Outtatown	2:33
4.	"Feigning"	Kitchens; Brytavious Chambers; Grayson Serio	Tay Keith; Grayson Beatz	2:46
5.	"Dollaz on My Head" (featuring Young Thug)	Kitchens; Jeffery Williams; Michael Williams II; Myles Harris	Mike Will Made It; M. Harris	3:18
6.	"Addys" (featuring Nechie)	Kitchens; Ceron Lee; Taurus Currie, Jr.; Chandler Durham	Taurus; Turbo	2:59
7.	"Skybox"	Kitchens; Adam Feeney; Durham	Taurus	2:58
8.	"Wunna"	Kitchens; Durham	Turbo	2:38
9.	"Blindfold" (featuring Lil Baby)	Kitchens; Dominique Jones; Glass	Wheezy	2:35
10.	"Rockstar Bikers & Chains"	Kitchens; J. Williams; Glass	Wheezy	2:09
11.	"Met Gala"	Kitchens; Glass; Robert Richardson	Justin Glass; Wheezy; Bobby Raps	2:29
12.	"Nasty Girl / On Camera"	Kitchens; Glass; Currie	Wheezy; Taurus; Fizzle	3:51
13.	"Cooler Than a Bitch" (featuring Roddy Ricch)	Kitchens; Rodrick Moore, Jr.; Jeffrey LaCroix; Lucas DiFabbio	Tre Pounds; Dunk Rock	3:17
14.	"I'm on Some"	Kitchens; Durron Butler; Glass; Durham	Wheezy; Turbo	2:23
15.	"Top Floor" (featuring Travis Scott)	Kitchens; Jacques Webster II; Durham; Glass	Turbo; Wheezy	2:49
16.	"Don't Play Around"	Kitchens; Gilmore; Tobias Dekker	Aviator Keyyz; Outtatown	3:11
17.	"Do Better"	Kitchens; Glass; Jasper Harris; Simon Christensen	Wheezy; J. Harris; Psymun	2:32
18.	"Far" (featuring Young Thug)	Kitchens; J. Williams; Durham	Turbo	2:59
Total length:				50:05

Deluxe edition (bonus tracks)
No.	Title	Writer(s)	Producer(s)	Length
19.	"200 for Lunch"	Kitchens; Currie	Taurus	2:29
20.	"Wunna Flo" (featuring Yak Gotti)	Kitchens; Deamonte Kendrick; Demba Faye	Young Twix	2:57
21.	"Street Sweeper" (featuring Future)	Kitchens; Nayvadius Wilburn; Kenneth Redfield; Durham	Kenny Stuntin; Turbo	3:12
22.	"One Watch" (featuring Young Thug)	Kitchens; J. Williams; Jordan Jenks	Pi'erre Bourne	3:56
23.	"Sun Came Out"	Kitchens; Currie	Taurus	2:17
24.	"Dirty Diana"	Kitchens; Currie; Gilmore; Alexander Lustig	Taurus; Aviator Keyyz; Alex Lustig	2:10
25.	"Nothing 4 Free" (featuring Nav)	Kitchens; Navraj Goraya; Andrew Franklin; Masamune Kudo; Everett Romano	Pro Logic; Rex Kudo; Heavy Mellow	2:45
26.	"Relentless" (featuring Lil Uzi Vert)	Kitchens; Symere Woods; Glass; Ozan Yıldırım; Nik Frascona	Wheezy; Oz; Nik D	2:48
Total length:				72:40

Notes

- All tracks are stylized in all caps, for example, "Skybox" is stylized as "SKYBOX".

== Personnel ==
Credits adapted from album's liner notes and Tidal.

- Flo Ongonga – engineering (tracks 1, 2, 4–8, 13, 18, 20–25), mixing (track 26)
- Turbo – engineering (track 3)
- A. Bainz – engineering (tracks 9–16, 19, 23), mixing (tracks 22, 26)
- Alejandro "Aleo" Neira – engineering (track 12), engineering assistant (tracks 9, 12, 13, 16)
- Shaan Singh – engineering (track 15)
- AJ – engineering (track 17)
- MarQuell Randolph – engineering (track 20)
- Bryan Anzel – engineering (track 21)
- Armani Mitchell – engineering assistant (track 4)
- E Town 100 – engineering assistant (track 6)
- Patrizio Pigliapoco – mixing (tracks 1–7, 9, 13, 15, 19–21, 24, 25)
- Alex Tumay – mixing (tracks 8, 10–12, 14, 16–18)
- Mixed by Ali – mixing for Roddy Ricch (track 13)
- Mike Dean – mixing for Travis Scott (track 15)
- Ashley Jackson – mixing assistant (tracks 1–7, 9, 13)
- Harry Taylor – mixing assistant (tracks 19, 20, 23, 25)
- Aresh Banaji – mixing assistant (tracks 21, 24)
- Nathan Miller – uncredited mixing assistant (tracks 8, 10–12, 14, 16–18)
- Christal Jerez – uncredited mixing assistant (tracks 8, 10–12, 14, 16–18)
- Joe LaPorta – mastering (all tracks)

== Charts ==
=== Weekly charts ===
Chart performance for Wunna
Chart (2020)	Peak position
Australian Albums (ARIA)	17
Austrian Albums (Ö3 Austria)	9
Belgian Albums (Ultratop Flanders)	18
Belgian Albums (Ultratop Wallonia)	14
Canadian Albums (Billboard)	1
Danish Albums (Hitlisten)	24
Dutch Albums (Album Top 100)	8
French Albums (SNEP)	14
German Albums (Offizielle Top 100)	26
Irish Albums (Official Charts)	14
Italian Albums (FIMI)	41
New Zealand Albums (RMNZ)	7
Norwegian Albums (VG-lista)	12
Swiss Albums (Schweizer Hitparade)	4
Swedish Albums (Sverigetopplistan)	49
UK Albums (Official Charts)	5
US Billboard 200	1
US Top R&B/Hip-Hop Albums (Billboard)	1

=== Year-end charts ===
2020 year-end chart performance for Wunna
Chart (2020)	Position
US Billboard 200	46
US Top R&B/Hip-Hop Albums (Billboard)	28

2021 year-end chart performance for Wunna
Chart (2021)	Position
US Billboard 200	108
US Top R&B/Hip-Hop Albums (Billboard)	66

== Certifications ==
Certifications for Wunna
Region	Certification	Certified units/sales
Canada (Music Canada)	Platinum	80,000^{‡}
New Zealand (RMNZ)	Gold	7,500^{‡}
South Africa (RISA)	Gold	25,000^{‡}
United Kingdom (BPI)	Silver	60,000^{‡}
United States (RIAA)	Platinum	1,000,000^{‡}
^{‡} Sales+streaming figures based on certification alone.

== Release history ==
Release dates and formats for Wunna
Region	Date	Label(s)	Format(s)	Edition	Ref.
Various	May 22, 2020	YSL; 300	Digital download; streaming	Standard	
Various	July 24, 2020	YSL; 300	Digital download; streaming	Deluxe	
