= Turbo (music producer) =

American record producer (born 1994)

- Turbo in 2025

Background information
- Also known as: Turbo the Great
- Born: Chandler A. Great; August 9, 1994 (age 32); College Park, Georgia, U.S.
- Genres: Hip-hop; trap; R&B
- Occupations: Record producer; songwriter
- Instruments: FL Studio; keyboard
- Years active: 2013–present
- Labels: Caroline; Warner/Chappell

Chandler A. Great (born August 9, 1994), known professionally as Turbo, is an American record producer. He is best known for his production work for hip-hop artists including Gunna, Nav, Lil Durk, Travis Scott, Drake, Young Thug, and Lil Baby, among others. His producer tag, "Run that back, Turbo", can be heard in many of his productions. He produced Lil Baby and Gunna's 2018 single "Drip Too Hard", which received diamond certification by the Recording Industry Association of America (RIAA).

== Career ==
In 2017, Turbo produced several songs on We Want Smoke, a compilation album by artists signed to T.I.'s Grand Hustle Records. He executive produced Drip Harder, a collaborative mixtape by Gunna and Lil Baby released in 2018, and is the solo producer on four songs of the mixtape, including "Never Recover" and "Close Friends" which were certified Platinum and "Drip Too Hard" which was certified Diamond. He also produced "Slimed In" on Young Thug's compilation album Slime Language, released in 2018. That same year, he produced on Gunna's third mixtape Drip Season 3. He also founded his own record production collective, The Playmakers.

In June 2019, he signed a co-publishing deal with Warner/Chappell Music. In 2020, he released Quarantine Clean with Young Thug and Gunna, which makes it the first song where Turbo is credited as lead artist.

In January 2022 Turbo served as a key producer on Gunna's album DS4Ever, which debuted atop the Billboard 200. With 150,000 album-equivalent units comprising 193.5 million on-demand streams and 4,000 pure sales, it became Gunna's second number-one album. The album notably blocked The Weeknd's album Dawn FM from the top spot by approximately 2,300 units.

In January 2024, Turbo reunited with Gunna for his song "Bachelor" a track that samples James Blake's "Do You Ever?".

That same month, musician Jamal Britt filed a lawsuit against Turbo and Warner Chappell Music due to misuse of Turbo's "Run that back, Turbo" producer tag which was recorded by Britt, noting that he "was never given notice that his voice was being used, never properly credited for his contributions to the songs in question and was never compensated from any of the royalty payments, profits, or other income garnered from the exploitation of his recorded voice".

== Production discography ==
=== Charted singles ===
| Title | Year | Peak chart positions | | | | | | | Album |
| Title | Year | US | US R&B/HH | CAN | IRE | NZ Hot | SWE | UK | Album |
|---|---|---|---|---|---|---|---|---|---|
| "Drip Too Hard" (Lil Baby and Gunna) | 2018 | 4 | 3 | 10 | 54 | — | 97 | 28 | Drip Harder |
| "Yosemite" (Travis Scott featuring Gunna and Nav) | 2018 | 25 | 16 | 18 | — | — | 92 | 93 | Astroworld |
| "One Call" (Gunna) | 2019 | 56 | 23 | 78 | — | — | — | — | Drip or Drown 2 |
| "Close Friends" (Lil Baby) | 2019 | 28 | 16 | 74 | — | — | — | 68 | Drip Harder |
| "Speed It Up" (Gunna) | 2019 | 91 | 43 | 96 | — | — | — | — | Drip or Drown 2 |
| "Quarantine Clean" (with Gunna and Young Thug) | 2020 | — | — | — | — | 36 | — | — | Non-album single |
| "Wunna" (Gunna) | 2020 | 57 | 24 | 79 | — | — | — | 83 | Wunna |
| "Bachelor" (with Gunna) | 2023 | — (Note: "Bachelor" did not enter the Billboard Hot 100, but peaked at number 21 on the Bubbling Under Hot 100 chart.) | 40 | — | — | 19 | — | — | Non-album singles |
| "Classy Girl" (with Gunna) | 2025 | — | — | — | — | 23 | — | — | Non-album singles |
| "WGFT" (feat. Burna Boy)" (with Gunna) | 2025 | 40 | 24 | — | — | — | — | 60 | The Last Wun |
"—" denotes a recording that did not chart or was not released in that territory.

=== Other charted songs ===
| Title | Year | Peak chart positions | | | | | Album |
| Title | Year | US | US R&B/HH | CAN | IRE | UK | Album |
|---|---|---|---|---|---|---|---|
| "Off White Vlone" (Lil Baby and Gunna featuring Lil Durk and Nav) | 2018 | 54 | 25 | 52 | — | — | Drip Harder |
| "Business Is Business" (Lil Baby and Gunna) | 2018 | 61 | 28 | 69 | — | — | Drip Harder |
| "Belly" (Lil Baby and Gunna) | 2018 | 80 | 37 | 92 | — | — | Drip Harder |
| "I Am" (Lil Baby and Gunna) | 2018 | 98 | 46 | — | — | — | Drip Harder |
| "Never Recover" (Lil Baby and Gunna featuring Drake) | 2018 | 15 | 9 | 16 | 89 | 46 | Drip Harder |
| "Miami" (Tory Lanez featuring Gunna) | 2018 | — | — | 89 | — | 88 | Love Me Now? |
| "Wit It" (Gunna) | 2019 | 75 | 36 | — | — | — | Drip or Drown 2 |
| "3 Headed Snake" (Gunna featuring Young Thug) | 2019 | 74 | 35 | — | — | — | Drip or Drown 2 |
| "Same Yung Nigga" (Gunna featuring Playboi Carti) | 2019 | 97 | 45 | — | — | — | Drip or Drown 2 |
| "Top Floor" (Gunna featuring Travis Scott) | 2020 | 55 | 22 | 73 | — | 90 | Wunna |
| "GP" (Gunna) | 2025 | 87 | 22 | — | — | — | The Last Wun |
| "Forever Be Mine" (Gunna feat. Wizkid) | 2025 | 68 | 16 | — | — | 46 | The Last Wun |
| "Sakpase" (Gunna) | 2025 | 70 | 17 | — | — | — | The Last Wun |
| "At My Purest" (Gunna feat. Offset) | 2025 | 72 | 18 | — | — | — | The Last Wun |
| "Let That Sink In" (Gunna) | 2025 | 80 | 21 | — | — | — | The Last Wun |
| "Prototype" (Gunna) | 2025 | — | 35 | — | — | — | The Last Wun |

== Production credits ==
| Title | Artist | Album | Year |
|---|---|---|---|
| "Do It By Myself" | Young Thug | Non-album single | 2016 |
| "Big Pimpin" | Shad Da God | Free the Goat | 2016 |
| "Smoke Tree" | Bankroll Mafia | Bankroll Mafia | 2016 |
| "What Money About" | Bankroll Mafia | Bankroll Mafia | 2016 |
| "Who Gone Check Me" | Hustle Gang | We Want Smoke | 2017 |
| "Gateway" | Hustle Gang | We Want Smoke | 2017 |
| "Beat the Case" (featuring Offset) | Gunna | Drip Season 2 | 2017 |
| "Hurry" | Lil Baby | Too Hard | 2017 |
| "Bubble Chevy" | Shad Da God | God Gang | 2017 |
| "We Did It" | Shad Da God | God Gang | 2017 |
| "Where Ya Been" | Johnny Cinco | I Swear 2 | 2018 |
| "Off The Rip" (featuring BlocBoy JB) | Hoodrich Pablo Juan | Non-album single | 2018 |
| "Extortion" (featuring Shy Glizzy) | Ever | Destined for Greatness | 2018 |
| "Slimed In" | Young Thug | Slime Language | 2018 |
| "Feeling" (featuring Spodee) | Young Thug | Non-album single | 2018 |
| "Off White Vlone" (featuring Lil Durk and Nav) | Lil Baby and Gunna | Drip Harder | 2018 |
| "Belly" | Lil Baby and Gunna | Drip Harder | 2018 |
| "Style Stealer" | Lil Baby and Gunna | Drip Harder | 2018 |
| "Close Friends" | Lil Baby and Gunna | Drip Harder | 2018 |
| "Drip Too Hard" | Lil Baby and Gunna | Drip Harder | 2018 |
| "Business Is Business" | Lil Baby and Gunna | Drip Harder | 2018 |
| "My Jeans" (featuring Young Thug) | Lil Baby and Gunna | Drip Harder | 2018 |
| "Never Recover" (with Drake) | Lil Baby and Gunna | Drip Harder | 2018 |
| "Seals Pills" | Lil Baby and Gunna | Drip Harder | 2018 |
| "Sold Out Dates" (featuring Lil Baby) | Gunna | Non-album single | 2018 |
| "Oh Okay" (featuring Lil Baby and Young Thug) | Gunna | Drip Season 3 | 2018 |
| "Almighty" (featuring Hoodrich Pablo Juan) | Gunna | Drip Season 3 | 2018 |
| "At the Hotel" | Gunna | Drip Season 3 | 2018 |
| "Spending Addiction" | Gunna | Drip Season 3 | 2018 |
| Yosemite | Travis Scott | Astroworld | 2018 |
| "Zoom" | Travis Scott | Non-album single | 2018 |
| "Bank" (featuring Moneybagg Yo) | Lil Baby | Harder Than Ever | 2018 |
| "Walk In" (Lil Baby) | Rylo Rodriguez | Gift From the Ghetto | 2018 |
| "Safe House" | Lil Yachty | Birthday Mix 3 | 2018 |
| "Last of the Real" | Jose Guapo | Non-album single | 2018 |
| "Eat" (featuring Gunna) | Nav | Reckless | 2018 |
| "Dubai Plates" (featuring Gunna) | Key Glock | Non-album single | 2018 |
| "Do You Understand" | Shy Glizzy | Non-album single | 2018 |
| "Invisible" (featuring Young Thug) | Shad Da God | City of God | 2018 |
| "Bank" (featuring MoneyBagg Yo) | Lil Baby | Harder Than Ever | 2018 |
| "Kick Down Yo Door" (featuring Hoodrich Pablo Juan) | MPR Tito | Rixh Blxxd | 2018 |
| "Still the Subject" | Strick | Risk=Reward 2 | 2018 |
| "Gucci Socks" (featuring Gunna) | Young Jordan | Slicey | 2018 |
| "Grimlin" | Young Jordan | Slicey | 2018 |
| "All of Em" | Young Jordan | Slicey | 2018 |
| "Wat U On" (featuring Gunna) | MoneyBagg Yo | Bet On Me | 2018 |
| "Eye Witness" | King Shooter | Non-album single | 2018 |
| "Bacc 2 Jail" | 03 Greedo | God Level | 2018 |
| "Praying to God" | 03 Greedo | God Level | 2018 |
| "I Told Em" | Lil Gotit | Non-album single | 2019 |
| "Turbo" | Q Da Fool | Non-album single | 2019 |
| "4 Real" | YNW Melly | Non-album single | 2019 |
| "Back2Back" (featuring Gunna & Young Thug) | Cheat Code | Yanna | 2019 |
| "Foreign" (featuring Yzerr & Tiji Jojo) | Bad Hop | Lift Off | 2019 |
| "Vibes On Vibes" | Gunna | Drip or Drown 2 | 2019 |
| "Outstanding" | Gunna | Drip or Drown 2 | 2019 |
| "Richard Millie Plain" | Gunna | Drip or Drown 2 | 2019 |
| "Derek Fisher" (featuring Lil Baby) | Gunna | Drip or Drown 2 | 2019 |
| "3 Headed Snake" (featuring Young Thug) | Gunna | Drip or Drown 2 | 2019 |
| "Big Shot" | Gunna | Drip or Drown 2 | 2019 |
| "On A Mountain" | Gunna | Drip or Drown 2 | 2019 |
| "Out the Hood" | Gunna | Drip or Drown 2 | 2019 |
| "Same Yung Nigga" (featuring Playboi Carti) | Gunna | Drip or Drown 2 | 2019 |
| "Quarantine Clean" | Gunna, Young Thug, and Turbo | Non-album single | 2020 |
| "ADDYS"(featuring Nechie) | Gunna | Wunna | 2020 |
| "I'm on Some" | Gunna | Wunna | 2020 |
| "Far"(featuring Young Thug) | Gunna | Wunna | 2020 |
| "Street Sweeper"(featuring Future) | Gunna | Wunna | 2020 |
| "Florida Water" (featuring Gunna & Clix) | FN Meka | Non-album single | 2022 |
| "how you did that" (featuring Kodak Black) | Gunna | DS4Ever | 2022 |
| Swing My Way | Offset | Non-album single | 2024 |
| "GP" | Gunna | The Last Wun | 2025 |
| "Let That Sink In" | Gunna | The Last Wun | 2025 |
| "Sakpase" | Gunna | The Last Wun | 2025 |
| "At My Purest" (featuring Offset) | Gunna | The Last Wun | 2025 |
| "Prototype" | Gunna | The Last Wun | 2025 |
| "WGFT" (featuring Burna Boy) | Gunna | The Last Wun | 2025 |
| "Forever Be Mine" | Gunna | The Last Wun | 2025 |
| "What They Thinking" | Gunna | The Last Wun | 2025 |
