= Jack Harlow discography =

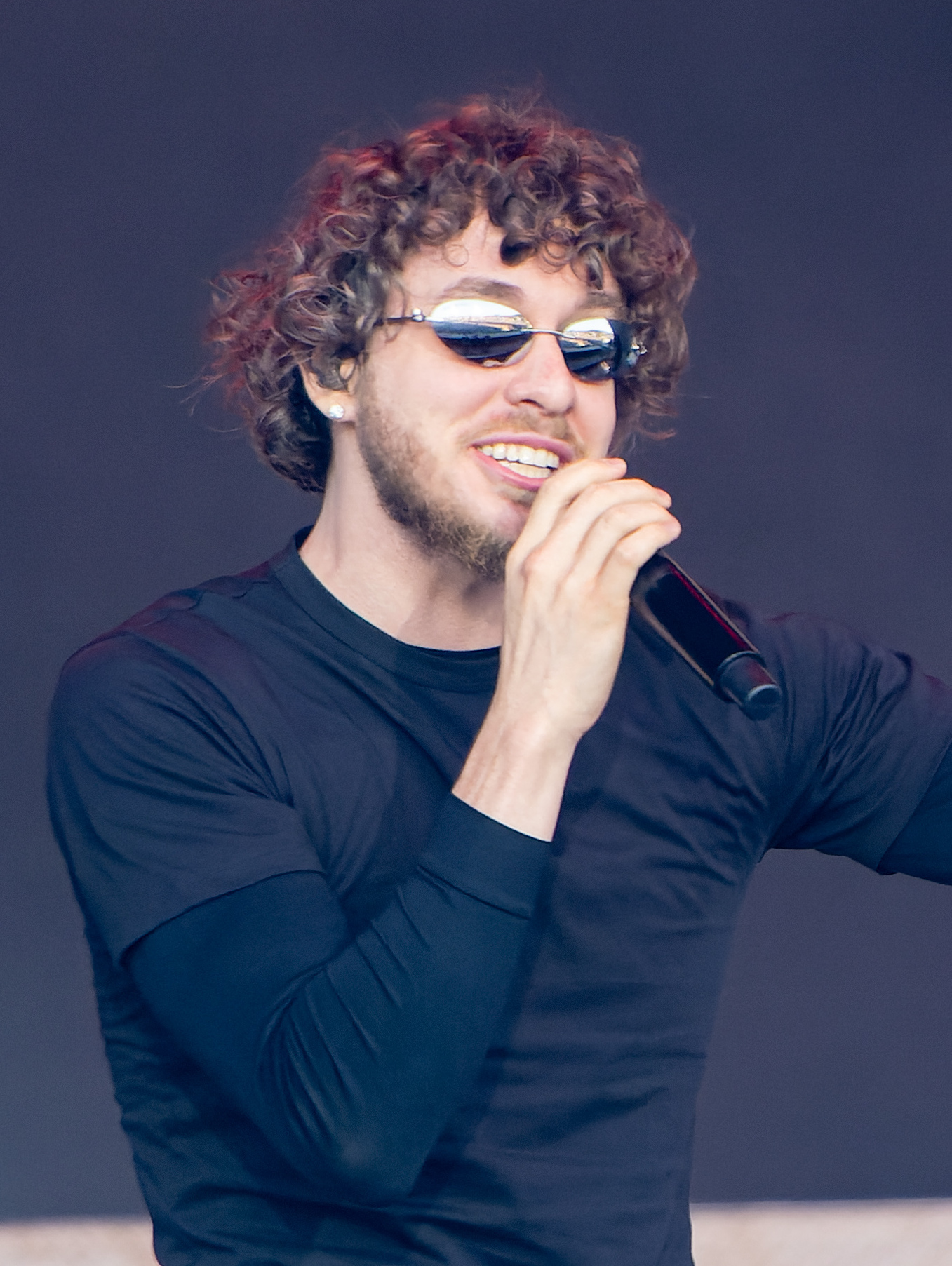
- Harlow at Glastonbury Festival 2023
- Studio albums: 4
- EPs: 3
- Singles: 40
- Mixtapes: 6

The discography of Jack Harlow, an American rapper, consists of four studio albums, six mixtapes, three extended plays (EPs), and 36 singles (including six as a featured artist). After celebrating his 22nd birthday with the release of his second extended play, Sweet Action (2020), Sweet Action reached number 20 on the US Billboard 200, and produced the top-10 single—"Whats Poppin'"—that reached number two on the US Billboard Hot 100. His debut studio album, Thats What They All Say (2020), debuted at number five on the Billboard 200. The album also produced the top-40 single, "Tyler Herro", which peaked at number 34 on the Hot 100, while the remix of "Whats Poppin'" (featuring DaBaby, Tory Lanez, and Lil Wayne), is also included on the album. In 2021, Harlow released a collaboration with Lil Nas X, titled "Industry Baby", became his first number-one single on the Hot 100.

His second studio album, Come Home the Kids Miss You (2022), debuted at number three on the Billboard 200, where it produced his second number-one single with "First Class" and making this his first song to debut atop the Hot 100. It also produced the top-20 single, "Nail Tech", which debuted at number 18 on the Hot 100. Two more songs from the album—"Dua Lipa" and "Churchill Downs" (featuring Drake)—became top 40 songs on the Hot 100, reaching numbers 21 and 23, respectively. His third studio album, Jackman (2023), debuted at number eight on the Billboard 200. Later that same year, he was featured on the single, "3D" by Jungkook, while releasing the single, "Lovin on Me", which debuted at numbers five and two on the Billboard Hot 100, respectively, with the latter peaking at number one.

== Studio albums ==
List of studio albums, with selected details and chart positions
Title	Album details	Peak chart positions										Certifications
Title	Album details	US	US R&B /HH	AUS	BEL (FL)	CAN	IRE	NLD	NOR	NZ	UK	Certifications
Thats What They All Say	Released: December 11, 2020; Label: Generation Now, Atlantic; Format: Digital download, streaming, LP, CD	5	2	36	136	7	48	38	38	18	73	RIAA: 2× Platinum; BPI: Silver; MC: 2× Platinum; RMNZ: Gold
Come Home the Kids Miss You	Released: May 6, 2022; Label: Generation Now, Atlantic; Format: Digital download, streaming, LP, CD, cassette	3	2	2	14	1	3	3	2	1	4	RIAA: Platinum; BPI: Silver; MC: Platinum
Jackman	Released: April 28, 2023; Label: Generation Now, Atlantic; Format: Digital download, streaming, LP, CD	8	2	11	28	9	20	12	23	8	32	
Monica	Released: March 13, 2026; Label: Atlantic; Format: Digital download, streaming, LP, CD	40	11	25	—	73	—	—	—	18	—	

== Mixtapes ==
List of mixtapes with selected album details
Title	Details
Extra Credit	Released: June 24, 2011; Label: Self-released; Formats: CD, digital download
Finally Handsome	Released: November 7, 2014; Label: Self-released; Formats: CD, digital download
18	Released: June 17, 2016; Label: Private Garden Records; Formats: Digital download
Gazebo	Released: November 17, 2017; Label: Private Garden Records; Formats: Digital download
Loose	Released: August 17, 2018; Label: Generation Now, Atlantic; Formats: Digital download
Confetti	Released: September 20, 2019; Label: Generation Now, Atlantic; Format: Vinyl, digital download

== Extended plays ==
List of extended plays with selected details
Title	Details	Peak chart positions				Certifications
Title	Details	US	US R&B /HH	CAN	NZ	Certifications
The Handsome Harlow	Released: November 13, 2015; Label: sonaBLAST!; Format: CD, digital download	—	—	—	—	
Sweet Action	Released: March 13, 2020; Label: Generation Now, Atlantic; Format: LP, digital download, streaming	20	14	15	—	MC: Platinum
Sweet Action II	Released: November 6, 2026; Label: Atlantic; Format: Digital download, streaming	—	—	—	33	
"—" denotes a recording that did not chart or was not released in that territory.

== Singles ==
=== As lead artist ===
List of singles as lead artist, showing year released, selected peak chart positions and album name
Title	Year	Peak chart positions										Certifications	Album
Title	Year	US	US R&B /HH	US Rap	AUS	CAN	IRE	NZ	SWE	UK	WW	Certifications	Album
"It's Pointless"	2014	—	—	—	—	—	—	—	—	—	—		Finally Handsome
"Cruisin'" (featuring Kal Weinstein)	2014	—	—	—	—	—	—	—	—	—	—		Finally Handsome
"Every Night"	2015	—	—	—	—	—	—	—	—	—	—		The Handsome Harlow
"Never Woulda Known" (featuring Johnny Spanish)	2016	—	—	—	—	—	—	—	—	—	—		18
"Ice Cream"	2016	—	—	—	—	—	—	—	—	—	—		18
"Bluntz n Medz" (with Cizzle Money Addict)	2017	—	—	—	—	—	—	—	—	—	—		Non-album singles
"Hitchcock"	2017	—	—	—	—	—	—	—	—	—	—		Non-album singles
"Banana Tree" (featuring Taylor)	2017	—	—	—	—	—	—	—	—	—	—		Non-album singles
"Routine"	2017	—	—	—	—	—	—	—	—	—	—		Gazebo
"Dark Knight"	2017	—	—	—	—	—	—	—	—	—	—		Gazebo
"Sundown"	2018	—	—	—	—	—	—	—	—	—	—		Loose
"Thru the Night" (featuring Bryson Tiller)	2019	—	—	—	—	—	—	—	—	—	—	RIAA: Gold; MC: Platinum; RMNZ: Gold	Confetti
"Whats Poppin" (solo or remix featuring DaBaby, Tory Lanez, and Lil Wayne)	2020	2	2	2	8	4	13	6	46	25	17	RIAA: Diamond; ARIA: 7× Platinum; BPI: Platinum; MC: Diamond; RMNZ: 5× Platinum	Sweet Action and Thats What They All Say
"Moana" (with G-Eazy)	2020	— (Note: "Moana" did not enter the US Billboard Hot 100, but peaked at number 23 on the Bubbling Under Hot 100 chart.)	—	—	—	72	—	— (Note: "Moana" did not chart on the NZ Top 40 Singles chart, but did peak at number 13 on the NZ Hot Singles chart.)	—	—	—	MC: Platinum	These Things Happen Too (Deluxe)
"Automatic"	2020	—	—	—	—	—	—	—	—	—	—		Madden NFL 21
"Nothin" (with Problem and Jay Rock)	2020	—	—	—	—	—	—	—	—	—	—		Non-album single
"Tyler Herro"	2020	34	11	10	68	27	38	— (Note: "Tyler Herro" did not chart on the NZ Top 40 Singles chart, but did peak at number five on the NZ Hot Singles chart.)	—	—	39	RIAA: 3× Platinum; BPI: Silver; MC: 4× Platinum; RMNZ: Platinum	Thats What They All Say
"Way Out" (featuring Big Sean)	2020	74	18	17	—	51	77	— (Note: "Way Out" did not enter the NZ Top 40 Singles Chart, but peaked at number eight on the NZ Hot Singles Chart.)	—	—	81	RIAA: Platinum; MC: 2× Platinum	Thats What They All Say
"Already Best Friends" (featuring Chris Brown)	2021	— (Note: "Already Best Friends" did not enter the US Billboard Hot 100, but peaked at number 19 on the Bubbling Under Hot 100 chart.)	—	—	—	—	—	— (Note: "Already Best Friends" did not enter the NZ Top 40 Singles Chart, but peaked at number 16 on the NZ Hot Singles Chart.)	—	—	—	RIAA: Platinum; BPI: Silver; MC: Gold; RMNZ: Platinum	Thats What They All Say
"Killer (Remix)" (with Eminem and Cordae)	2021	62	21	18	92	37	64	—	—	77	67	RIAA: Platinum; ARIA: Gold; RMNZ: Gold	Non-album single
"I Won" (with Ty Dolla Sign and 24kGoldn)	2021	—	—	—	—	—	—	— (Note: "I Won" did not enter the NZ Top 40 Singles Chart, but peaked at number 13 on the NZ Hot Singles Chart.)	—	—	—		F9: The Fast Saga (Original Motion Picture Soundtrack)
"Industry Baby" (with Lil Nas X)	2021	1	1	1	4	3	2	1	8	3	2	RIAA: 6× Platinum; ARIA: 7× Platinum; BPI: 2× Platinum; GLF: Platinum; MC: 7× Platinum; RMNZ: 5× Platinum	Montero
"SUVs (Black on Black)" (with Pooh Shiesty)	2021	67	21	15	—	46	—	— (Note: "SUVs (Black on Black)" did not enter the NZ Top 40 Singles Chart, but peaked at number 15 on the NZ Hot Singles Chart.)	—	—	81	RIAA: Platinum	Shiesty Season: Certified
"Nail Tech"	2022	18	4	4	22	11	28	26	— (Note: "Nail Tech" did not enter the Swedish Singellista Chart, but peaked at number eight on the Swedish Heatseeker Chart.)	55	23	RIAA: Platinum; MC: 2× Platinum; RMNZ: Platinum	Come Home the Kids Miss You
"First Class"	2022	1	1	1	1	1	2	1	8	2	2	RIAA: 4× Platinum; ARIA: 5× Platinum; BPI: Platinum; MC: 7× Platinum; RMNZ: 4× Platinum	Come Home the Kids Miss You
"They Don't Love It"	2023	54	17	9	— (Note: "They Don't Love It" did not enter the ARIA Singles Chart, but peaked at number 20 on the ARIA New Music Singles Chart.)	40	56	— (Note: "They Don't Love It" did not enter the NZ Top 40 Singles Chart, but peaked at number two on the NZ Hot Singles Chart.)	—	76	110		Jackman
"Lovin on Me"	2023	1	1	1	1	1	2	1	7	1	1	RIAA: 4× Platinum; ARIA: 6× Platinum; BPI: 2× Platinum; MC: 7× Platinum; RMNZ: 4× Platinum	Non-album single
"Stop Giving Me Advice" (with Lyrical Lemonade and Dave)	2023	—	—	—	—	—	33	— (Note: "Stop Giving Me Advice" did not enter the NZ Top 40 Singles Chart, but peaked at number seven on the NZ Hot Singles Chart.)	—	29	—		All Is Yellow
"Hello Miss Johnson"	2024	85	26	22	—	87	—	— (Note: "Hello Miss Johnson" did not enter the NZ Top 40 Singles Chart, but peaked at number 11 on the NZ Hot Singles Chart.)	—	—	—		Non-album singles
"Tranquility"	2024	—	—	—	—	—	—	— (Note: "Tranquility" did not enter the NZ Top 40 Singles Chart, but peaked at number 35 on the NZ Hot Singles Chart.)	—	—	—		Non-album singles
"Set You Free"	2025	— (Note: "Set You Free" did not enter the US Billboard Hot 100, but peaked at number 20 on the Bubbling Under Hot 100 chart.)	—	—	—	—	—	— (Note: "Set You Free" did not enter the NZ Top 40 Singles Chart, but peaked at number 26 on the NZ Hot Singles Chart.)	—	98	—		Non-album singles
"Just Us" (featuring Doja Cat)	2025	57	15	10	—	61	82	— (Note: "Just Us" did not enter the NZ Top 40 Singles Chart, but peaked at number 5 on the NZ Hot Singles Chart.)	—	50	96		Non-album singles
"Trade Places"	2026	91	21	—	—	89	—	— (Note: "Trade Places" did not enter the NZ Top 40 Singles Chart, but peaked at number 6 on the NZ Hot Singles Chart.)	—	—	—		Monica
"—" denotes a recording that did not chart or was not released in that territory.

=== As featured artist ===
List of singles as featured artist, showing year released, selected peak chart positions and album name
Title	Year	Peak chart positions										Certifications	Album
Title	Year	US	US R&B /HH	US Rap	AUS	CAN	IRE	NZ	SWE	UK	WW	Certifications	Album
"Cheap Cheap" (Felly featuring Jack Harlow)	2019	—	—	—	—	—	—	—	—	—	—		Non-album single
"Bad Girls Dream" (Zoya featuring Jack Harlow)	2019	—	—	—	—	—	—	—	—	—	—		Bad Girls Dream
"Tap In (Remix)" (Saweetie featuring Post Malone, DaBaby, and Jack Harlow)	2020	—	—	—	—	—	—	— (Note: "Tap In (Remix)" did not enter the NZ Top 40 Singles Chart, but peaked at number 11 on the NZ Hot Singles Chart.)	—	—	—		Pretty Bitch Music
"Lil Boi (Big Talk) (Remix)" (Ayanis featuring Jack Harlow)	2020	—	—	—	—	—	—	—	—	—	—		Yani
"Pussy Talk (Remix)" (City Girls, Quavo, and Lil Wayne featuring Jack Harlow)	2020	—	—	—	—	—	—	—	—	—	—		Non-album single
"Hot Boy Bling" (French Montana featuring Jack Harlow and Lil Durk)	2021	—	—	—	—	—	—	—	—	—	—		CB5
"Body (Remix)" (Russ Millions and Tion Wayne featuring Jack Harlow)	2021	—	—	—	—	—	—	—	—	—	—		Non-album singles
"White Lies" (The Homies featuring Jack Harlow)	2021	—	—	—	—	—	—	—	—	—	—		Non-album singles
"Backstage Passes" (EST Gee featuring Jack Harlow)	2022	98	28	18	—	—	—	— (Note: "Backstage Passes" did not enter the NZ Top 40 Singles Chart, but peaked at number 23 on the NZ Hot Singles Chart.)	—	—	—		I Never Felt Nun
"3D" (Jungkook featuring Jack Harlow)	2023	5	—	—	7	10	15	9	80	5	1	BPI: Silver; MC: 2× Platinum; RMNZ: Gold	Golden
"—" denotes a recording that did not chart or was not released in that territory.

== Other charted and certified songs ==
List of other charted songs showing year released, certifications and album name
Title	Year	Peak chart positions										Certifications	Album
Title	Year	US	US R&B /HH	US Rap	AUS	CAN	IRE	NZ	SWE	UK	WW	Certifications	Album
"I Wanna See Some Ass" (featuring JetsonMade)	2020	—	—	—	—	—	79	—	—	—	—	RIAA: Platinum; BPI: Silver; MC: 2× Platinum; RMNZ: Platinum	Sweet Action
"Face of My City" (featuring Lil Baby)	2020	— (Note: "Face of My City" did not enter the Billboard Hot 100, but peaked at number seven on the Bubbling Under Hot 100 Singles chart.)	43	—	—	93	—	— (Note: "Face of My City" did not enter the NZ Top 40 Singles Chart, but peaked at number 15 on the NZ Hot Singles Chart.)	—	—	—	RIAA: Gold	Thats What They All Say
"Route 66" (featuring EST Gee)	2020	—	—	—	—	—	—	—	—	—	—	RIAA: Gold; MC: Gold	Thats What They All Say
"Luv Is Dro" (featuring Static Major and Bryson Tiller)	2020	—	—	—	—	—	—	— (Note: "Luv Is Dro" did not enter the NZ Top 40 Singles Chart, but peaked at number 37 on the NZ Hot Singles Chart.)	—	—	—	RIAA: Gold; MC: Gold; RMNZ: Gold	Thats What They All Say
"Talk of the Town"	2022	— (Note: "Talk of the Town" did not enter the Billboard Hot 100, but peaked at number six on the Bubbling Under Hot 100 Singles chart.)	36	—	—	75	—	—	—	—	180		Come Home the Kids Miss You
"Young Harleezy"	2022	97	28	24	78	59	—	— (Note: "Young Harleezy" did not enter the NZ Top 40 Singles Chart, but peaked at number nine on the NZ Hot Singles Chart.)	—	—	131		Come Home the Kids Miss You
"I'd Do Anything to Make You Smile"	2022	88	25	21	70	54	—	— (Note: "I'd Do Anything to Make You Smile" did not enter the NZ Top 40 Singles Chart, but peaked at number eight on the NZ Hot Singles Chart.)	—	—	119		Come Home the Kids Miss You
"Dua Lipa"	2022	21	8	6	13	13	20	11	56	33	31	RIAA: Platinum; MC: Platinum; RMNZ: Gold	Come Home the Kids Miss You
"Side Piece"	2022	— (Note: "Side Piece" did not enter the Billboard Hot 100, but peaked at number three on the Bubbling Under Hot 100 Singles chart.)	33	—	76	62	—	—	—	—	147		Come Home the Kids Miss You
"Movie Star" (featuring Pharrell Williams)	2022	— (Note: "Movie Star" did not enter the Billboard Hot 100, but peaked at number one on the Bubbling Under Hot 100 Singles chart.)	30	—	89	63	—	—	—	—	152		Come Home the Kids Miss You
"Lil Secret"	2022	— (Note: "Lil Secret" did not enter the Billboard Hot 100, but peaked at number 10 on the Bubbling Under Hot 100 Singles chart.)	47	—	—	89	—	—	—	—	—		Come Home the Kids Miss You
"I Got a Shot"	2022	— (Note: "I Got a Shot" did not enter the Billboard Hot 100, but peaked at number four on the Bubbling Under Hot 100 Singles chart.)	34	—	—	58	—	—	—	—	158		Come Home the Kids Miss You
"Churchill Downs" (featuring Drake)	2022	23	9	7	17	11	12	25	— (Note: "Churchill Downs" did not enter the Swedish Singellista Chart, but peaked at number 11 on the Swedish Heatseeker Chart.)	19	38	RIAA: Platinum; BPI: Silver; MC: Platinum; ARIA: Platinum; RMNZ: Gold	Come Home the Kids Miss You
"Like a Blade of Grass"	2022	— (Note: "Like a Blade of Grass" did not enter the Billboard Hot 100, but peaked at number seven on the Bubbling Under Hot 100 Singles chart.)	37	—	—	64	—	—	—	—	179		Come Home the Kids Miss You
"Parent Trap" (featuring Justin Timberlake)	2022	— (Note: "Parent Trap" did not enter the Billboard Hot 100, but peaked at number nine on the Bubbling Under Hot 100 Singles chart.)	42	—	—	73	—	—	—	—	198		Come Home the Kids Miss You
"Poison" (featuring Lil Wayne)	2022	99	29	25	—	72	—	—	—	—	164		Come Home the Kids Miss You
"Psychic" (Chris Brown featuring Jack Harlow)	2022	78	21	—	52	85	—	— (Note: "Psychic" did not enter the NZ Top 40 Singles Chart, but peaked at number four on the NZ Hot Singles Chart.)	—	64	122	RMNZ: Gold	Breezy
"Yungen" (Rod Wave featuring Jack Harlow)	2022	35	12	—	—	—	—	—	—	—	—	RIAA: Gold	Beautiful Mind
"Common Ground"	2023	96	28	18	—	76	—	— (Note: "Common Ground" did not enter the NZ Top 40 Singles Chart, but peaked at number six on the NZ Hot Singles Chart.)	—	—	—		Jackman
"Ambitious"	2023	— (Note: "Ambitious" did not enter the Billboard Hot 100, but peaked at number nine on the Bubbling Under Hot 100 Singles chart.)	34	22	—	—	—	—	—	—	—		Jackman
"Is That Ight?"	2023	— (Note: "Is That Ight?" did not enter the Billboard Hot 100, but peaked at number 11 on the Bubbling Under Hot 100 Singles chart.)	36	24	—	—	—	—	—	—	—		Jackman
"Gang Gang Gang"	2023	— (Note: "Gang Gang Gang" did not enter the Billboard Hot 100, but peaked at number 23 on the Bubbling Under Hot 100 Singles chart.)	42	—	—	—	—	—	—	—	—		Jackman
"Denver"	2023	— (Note: "Denver" did not enter the Billboard Hot 100, but peaked at number 10 on the Bubbling Under Hot 100 Singles chart.)	35	23	—	—	—	—	—	—	—		Jackman
"No Enhancers"	2023	—	45	—	—	—	—	—	—	—	—		Jackman
"It Can't Be"	2023	—	43	—	—	—	—	— (Note: "It Can't Be" did not enter the NZ Top 40 Singles Chart, but peaked at number 11 on the NZ Hot Singles Chart.)	—	—	—		Jackman
"Blame on Me"	2023	—	46	—	—	—	—	— (Note: "Blame on Me" did not enter the NZ Top 40 Singles Chart, but peaked at number 10 on the NZ Hot Singles Chart.)	—	—	—		Jackman
"Lonesome"	2026	—	46	—	—	—	—	— (Note: "Lonesome" did not enter the NZ Top 40 Singles Chart, but peaked at number 8 on the NZ Hot Singles Chart.)	—	—	—		Monica
"Prague"	2026	—	47	—	—	—	—	— (Note: "Prague" did not enter the NZ Top 40 Singles Chart, but peaked at number 12 on the NZ Hot Singles Chart.)	—	—	—		Monica
"All of My Friends"	2026	—	—	—	—	—	—	— (Note: "All of My Friends" did not enter the NZ Top 40 Singles Chart, but peaked at number 13 on the NZ Hot Singles Chart.)	—	—	—		Monica
"Signora"	2026	—	—	—	—	—	—	— (Note: "Signora" did not enter the NZ Top 40 Singles Chart, but peaked at number 18 on the NZ Hot Singles Chart.)	—	—	—		Sweet Action II
"Too Soon" (featuring Babyface)	2026	— (Note: "Too Soon" did not enter the US Billboard Hot 100, but peaked at number 10 on the Bubbling Under Hot 100 chart.)	39	—	—	—	—	— (Note: "Too Soon" did not enter the NZ Top 40 Singles Chart, but peaked at number 3 on the NZ Hot Singles Chart.)	—	—	—		Sweet Action II
"She Gets Me"	2026	—	—	—	—	—	—	— (Note: "She Gets Me" did not enter the NZ Top 40 Singles Chart, but peaked at number 17 on the NZ Hot Singles Chart.)	—	—	—		Sweet Action II
"610 Magnolia"	2026	—	—	—	—	—	—	— (Note: "610 Magnolia" did not enter the NZ Top 40 Singles Chart, but peaked at number 19 on the NZ Hot Singles Chart.)	—	—	—		Sweet Action II
"—" denotes a recording that did not chart or was not released in that territory.

== Guest appearances ==
List of non-single guest appearances, with other performing artists
Title	Year	Other artist(s)	Album
"Yikes"	2020	—N/a	Scoob! The Album
"Time"	2020	Statik Selektah	The Balancing Act
"Tide Pen"	2020	Smokepurpp	Florida Jit
"Comic Sans"	2021	Audrey Nuna	A Liquid Breakfast
"Paperwork Party (Remix)"	2021	Babyface Ray	Unfuckwitable
"Louie Bags"	2022	Kanye West	Donda 2
"Psychic"	2022	Chris Brown	Breezy
"Yungen"	2022	Rod Wave	Beautiful Mind
"Mockingbird Valley"	2023	DJ Drama	I'm Really Like That

== Cameo appearances ==
List of music videos, with artists, showing year released
Title	Year	Other artist(s)	Album
"Whole Lotta Ice"	2021	BigWalkDog, Lil Baby, Pooh Shiesty	N/A
