= Churchill Downs (song) =

2022 song by Jack Harlow featuring Drake

Song by Jack Harlow featuring Drake

from the album Come Home the Kids Miss You
- Released: May 6, 2022
- Genre: Hip hop
- Length: 5:09
- Label: Generation Now; Atlantic
- Songwriters: Jack Harlow; Aubrey Graham; Matthew Samuels; Tahrence Brown; Ryan Bakalarczyk; Alex Ernewein; Rogét Chahayed; José Velazquez
- Producers: Boi-1da; Audi; BEDRM; Ace G

Music video
- "Churchill Downs" on YouTube

"Churchill Downs" is a song by American rapper Jack Harlow featuring Canadian rapper Drake from the former's second studio album Come Home the Kids Miss You (2022). It was produced by Boi-1da, Audi, BEDRM, and Ace G.

== Background ==
Producer Ace G stated that the making of the song began with him and his partner Myriam Eydo in the studio, improvising on the synth and the harp respectively. Eydo started singing, from which the melody was created.

The song leaked in May 2022, upon which it received attention for Drake taking subliminal shots at rapper Pusha T. Jack Harlow said in an interview with Hot 97 that both he and Drake were upset about the leak. Pusha T responded to the leak on The Breakfast Club, saying, "I even heard that and it sounds old to me. Like, the flows sound old. And then it's like, even what is considered like, the shots. It's like, bro, after what I've done, like 'the middleman' talk and all that type of talk — that's not scathing for me. I'm here to like, burn down everything." Harlow later revealed on The Breakfast Club that he added more lyrics to his verse after he heard Drake's.

In June 2022, fellow American rapper Lil Yachty revealed to YouTuber DJ Akademiks some details behind how the song was composed. According to Yachty, Drake told him that he wrote his verse in about 11 minutes, in front of Harlow, while they were on vacation in the Turks and Caicos Islands.

== Composition ==
The song uses a flute instrumental. In the song, the artists rap about the pitfalls of fame, and "throw humble compliments at each other when they're not offering cutting, pragmatic commentary". Jack Harlow's line "I'm hip-hop, do you fully understand?" have been called the "defining defensive line" of the album. Drake also references his feud with Pusha T in his verse.

== Critical reception ==
A.D. Amorosi of Variety praised Drake's feature on the song, writing: "Drake's lyrics about life in the limelight are some of the best he's come up with since 2020; the next Drake record is something to really look forward to, if this is where he's going." Mosi Reeves of Rolling Stone wrote that Drake "doesn't disappoint here" and performs "another great verse from a rapper famed for his poetically aggrieved self-absorption", while also writing, "Meanwhile, Harlow can only offer bland braggadocio." In contrast, Matthew Strauss of Pitchfork described the song as "more or less a copy of an up-late Drake confessional". Additionally, Strauss wrote, "A big mistake, however, was actually getting Drake on the song, as the veteran artist sounds like he has something worth saying. Meanwhile Harlow, despite the growing fame and unending fascination, is still finding his footing."

== Music video ==
Harlow and Drake used their appearance at the 2022 Kentucky Derby to shoot a music video for "Churchill Downs" at its namesake venue. The official music video was filmed at the 2022 Kentucky Derby and released on June 1, 2022. Directed by Ace Pro, the clip sees Jack Harlow and Drake rapping at the event, holding bets in their hands, and watching the race, while blending slow motion footage of the horses racing. Earlier in the video, Harlow appears in a baseball bat factory, as a reference to the Louisville Slugger. The video moves from Louisville Slugger baseball imagery to Churchill Downs and Kentucky Derby scenes, placing baseball craftsmanship and horse-racing spectacle in the same Louisville visual sequence. The video also features cameos from Baka Not Nice, Boi-1da, Bryson Tiller, DJ Drama, Druski, Hit-Boy, Taylor Rooks, and Harlow's mother Maggie, who dances as Drake raps to her.

== Charts ==
Chart performance for "Churchill Downs"
Chart (2022)	Peak position
Australia (ARIA)	17
Canada Hot 100 (Billboard)	11
Global 200 (Billboard)	38
Ireland (IRMA)	12
Netherlands (Single Top 100)	88
New Zealand (Recorded Music NZ)	25
Portugal (AFP)	101
South Africa Streaming (TOSAC)	5
Sweden Heatseeker (Sverigetopplistan)	11
Switzerland (Schweizer Hitparade)	76
UK Singles (Official Charts)	19
US Billboard Hot 100	23
US Hot R&B/Hip-Hop Songs (Billboard)	9

== Certifications ==
Certifications for "Churchill Downs"
Region	Certification	Certified units/sales
Australia (ARIA)	Platinum	70,000^{‡}
United Kingdom (BPI)	Silver	200,000^{‡}
United States (RIAA)	Gold	500,000^{‡}
^{‡} Sales+streaming figures based on certification alone.
