= Monica (album) =

Studio album by Jack Harlow
- Released: March 13, 2026
- Studios: Electric Lady, New York City
- Genre: R&B
- Length: 28:01
- Label: Atlantic
- Producers: 2forwOyNE; Aksel Arvid; BabeTruth; Clay Harlow; Frank Rankin; Hollywood Cole; Jermaine Paul; Rogét Chahayed

Jack Harlow chronology
Jackman (2023)	Monica (2026)	Sweet Action II (2026)

Singles from Monica
- 1. "Trade Places" Released: March 13, 2026

Monica is the fourth studio album by American rapper Jack Harlow. It was released by Atlantic Records on March 13, 2026. It marks Harlow's first release in almost three years following Jackman (2023). It features a collaboration with James Savage and features production from frequent collaborators BabeTruth, Hollywood Cole, Clay Harlow, Aksel Arvid and Rogét Chahayed, among others. The album's release date coincided with Harlow's 28th birthday.

== Background and release ==
Written in 2025 after his move to New York City and recorded at Electric Lady Studios, the release follows Harlow's previous studio album, Jackman (2023). The release date coincides with his 28th birthday, and marks his return to the music scene after a year's absence, since the 2025 single "Just Us". In an interview with Rolling Stone, Harlow discussed the impact that his change of environment had on his artistry, stating: "When I move somewhere new, I start seeing myself differently. It shakes something loose. That's when the songs start coming."

During an interview with music journalist Zane Lowe for Apple Music in March 2025, Harlow said he wanted to do something he had never done before and that it would take him longer than any of his previous projects. When asked whether songs such as "Just Us", "Tranquility", "Set You Free", and others would appear on the final album, he replied: "To be determined. It depends a lot on how the album shakes out sonically and if these songs feel like they should be a part of it... We'll see what the bigger picture is."

Harlow announced the album's release on Instagram on February 10, 2026, making it available for pre-order. Pre-orders for vinyl records were launched alongside the official announcement, while physical versions were in preparation at that time. The vinyl format was released in several versions, including cream-colored vinyl and signed vinyl, in addition to the classic CD format. The cover art and release date were unveiled, but no other information, including the tracklist or artists featured on the album, was disclosed at that time. The album cover, posted on Instagram at the time of the announcement, shows a blurred photo of Harlow leaning back with his eyes closed, wearing sunglasses and a brown cap.

== Critical reception ==
Professional ratings
Aggregate scores
Source	Rating
Metacritic	49/100
Review scores
Source	Rating
AllMusic	2/5 stars
Clash	8/10
InBetweenDrafts	6/10
Neon Music	3/5
NME	3/5 stars
Pitchfork	3.1/10
Riff	7/10
Rolling Stone	3/5 stars
Stanisland	1.5/5 stars

According to the review aggregator Metacritic, Monica received "mixed or average reviews" based on a weighted average score of 49 out of 100 from five critic scores.

== Track listing ==
Monica track listing
No.	Title	Writer(s)	Producer(s)	Length
1.	"Trade Places"	Jackman Harlow; Aksel Arvid; Clayborn Harlow; Dawoyne Lawson; Nickie Jon Pabón; Franklin Rankin; Jose Velazquez	2forwOyNE; Arvid; BabeTruth; C. Harlow; Rankin^{[c]}	3:02
2.	"Lonesome"	J. Harlow; Arvid; Rogét Chahayed; C. Harlow; Pabón; Jermaine Paul; Velazquez	BabeTruth; C. Harlow; Chahayed; Paul^{[c]}; Arvid^{[a]}	3:16
3.	"Prague"	J. Harlow; Arvid; C. Harlow; Pabón; Paul	Arvid; C. Harlow^{[c]}; Arvid^{[c]}	3:15
4.	"My Winter"	J. Harlow; Arvid; Jason Cornet; Cory Henry; Pabón; Paull; Rankin; Velazquez	Arvid	3:15
5.	"Move Along" (featuring James Savage)	Arvid; Henry; Rankin; James Savage	Arvid; Rankin^{[c]}	0:54
6.	"All of My Friends"	J. Harlow; Arvid; Kameron Cole; Robert Glasper; Peder Losnegård; Pabón	Arvid; Hollywood Cole	2:57
7.	"Living Alone"	J. Harlow; Arvid; Cole; Henry; Pabón; Paul; Rankin; Velazquez	BabeTruth; Hollywood Cole; Arvid^{[a]}; Paul^{[a]}	3:12
8.	"Against the Grain"	J. Harlow; Arvid; Cole; Henry; Pabón; Paul	Arvid; Paul^{[a]}; Hollywood Cole^{[a]}	3:13
9.	"Say Hello"	J. Harlow; Glasper; C. Harlow; Pabón; Paul	Arvid	4:57
Total length:				28:01

=== Notes ===
- ^{^[c]} indicates a co-producer
- ^{^[a]} indicates an additional producer

== Personnel ==
Credits adapted from Tidal.

=== Musicians ===
- Jack Harlow – vocals
- Jermaine Paul – bass (all tracks), ride cymbals (track 2)
- Clay Harlow – drum programming (1–3)
- Stephane Clement – trumpet (1, 2, 4–6, 9)
- Franklin Rankin – guitar (1, 3, 4, 8)
- BabeTruth – drum programming (1), brush drums (4)
- 2forwOyNE – drum programming (1)
- Mustafa – additional vocals (2)
- Rogét Chahayed – piano (2)
- Ravyn Lenae – additional vocals (3, 4, 6, 9)
- Aksel Arvid – strings arrangement (3, 5, 6, 9), drum programming (3, 8, 9), Rhodes piano (3, 9), additional vocals (6), piano (7)
- Shaan Ramaprasad – strings arrangement, violin (3, 5, 6, 9)
- Cory Henry – organ (4, 5, 8), piano (4, 7), Rhodes piano (7)
- Brian Richburg – drums (4)
- TenRoc – Rhodes piano (4)
- James Savage – vocals (5), additional vocals (8)
- Hollywood Cole – drum programming (6–8)
- Nickie Jon Pabón – additional vocals (6)
- Lido – organ (6)
- Robert Glasper – piano (6, 9)
- Omar Apollo – additional vocals (7)
- Brian Harlow – vocals (8)
- Maggie Harlow – vocals (8)

=== Technical ===
- Nickie Jon Pabón – recording, mixing
- BabeTruth – engineering (1)
- Julian Vasquez – engineering (2, 7, 8)
- Lauren Marquez – engineering (3, 5, 6, 9)
- Aksel Arvid – engineering (4), vocal engineering (5)
- Mose Wheeler – engineering assistance (8)
- Josh Gudwin – immersive mixing
- Colin Leonard – mastering

== Charts ==
Chart performance for Monica
Chart (2026)	Peak position
Australian Albums (ARIA)	25
Australian Hip Hop/R&B Albums (ARIA)	3
Canadian Albums (Billboard)	73
New Zealand Albums (RMNZ)	18
Portuguese Albums (AFP)	39
Swiss Albums (Schweizer Hitparade)	42
UK R&B Albums (Official Charts)	7
US Billboard 200	40
US Top R&B/Hip-Hop Albums (Billboard)	11
