= Dua Lipa (song) =

2022 song by Jack Harlow

Song by Jack Harlow

from the album Come Home the Kids Miss You
- Released: May 6, 2022
- Genre: Trap
- Length: 2:15
- Label: Generation Now; Atlantic
- Songwriters: Jack Harlow; Rogét Chahayed; Michael Mulé; Isaac De Boni; Federico Vindver; José Velazquez; Dawoyne Lawson; Jasper Harris; Nathan Ward II; Nickie Jon Pabón; Douglas Ford
- Producers: Harlow; Chahayed; FnZ; Vindver; BabeTruth; 2forWoyne; Harris; Nemo Achida

"Dua Lipa" is a song by American rapper Jack Harlow from his second studio album Come Home the Kids Miss You (2022). It is named after the English singer.

== Background ==
Harlow stated in an interview with The Breakfast Club that he reached out to Dua Lipa via FaceTime to get her permission to release the song, which he played for her, and that he would not have released it if she did not approve. According to Harlow, "But she was like, 'Oh, it's not my song. I suppose it's okay.' She was just kinda thrown off and she just kinda let it go." He added that his conversations with her have been "less awkward" ever since.

The song was also previewed days before it was released on May 6, 2022, as a track from Come Home the Kids Miss You.

== Composition ==
In the song, Jack Harlow raps over a trap beat about his desire to form a relationship with Dua Lipa. In addition, he compares his rise to fame to that of Ariana Grande (also referencing her song "Thank U, Next"), and mentions growing his pectoral muscles (with an acknowledgment to his personal trainer) and collaboration with Kanye West. He also name-drops Dallas Mavericks NBA player Luka Dončić.

== Critical reception ==
AllMusic praised the song, calling it "bouncy, sophomoric fun". Matthew Strauss of Pitchfork gave a more critical review of the song, writing, "...Harlow simply incorporates the global star's name into a refrain. The song's got nothing to do with Dua Lipa; again, it's the sort of knowing wink that makes for good tabloid fodder but not necessarily good music. Were it not called 'Dua Lipa,' there would be nothing of note about the song, which has a flat beat and equally flat bars." Comparing it to Harlow's song "Tyler Herro", Strauss wrote that "'Dua Lipa' is just being vaguely horny on main, as he might say."

== Charts ==
Chart performance for "Dua Lipa"
Chart (2022)	Peak position
Australia (ARIA)	13
Canada Hot 100 (Billboard)	13
Denmark (Tracklisten)	29
Global 200 (Billboard)	31
Iceland (Tónlistinn)	19
Ireland (IRMA)	20
New Zealand (Recorded Music NZ)	11
Norway (VG-lista)	31
Portugal (AFP)	79
South Africa Streaming (TOSAC)	15
Sweden (Sverigetopplistan)	56
Switzerland (Schweizer Hitparade)	59
UK Singles (Official Charts)	33
US Billboard Hot 100	21
US Hot R&B/Hip-Hop Songs (Billboard)	8

== Certifications ==
Certifications for "Dua Lipa"
Region	Certification	Certified units/sales
New Zealand (RMNZ)	Gold	15,000^{‡}
United States (RIAA)	Gold	500,000^{‡}
^{‡} Sales+streaming figures based on certification alone.
