= Common Ground (song) =

2023 song by Jack Harlow

Song by Jack Harlow

from the album Jackman
- Released: April 28, 2023
- Genre: Hip hop
- Length: 1:40
- Label: Generation Now; Atlantic
- Songwriters: Jackman Harlow; José Velazquez; Niko The Great; Jaysoul; Mike Washington Jr.; Joi Marshall; Tonya Kelly; Diyelle Reed; Emanuel Officer
- Producers: BabeTruth; Mike Wavvs; Jaysoul; Niko

Lyric video
- "Common Ground" on YouTube

"Common Ground" is a song by American rapper Jack Harlow from his third studio album Jackman. (2023). The BabeTruth, Mike Wavvs, Jaysoul, and Niko produced track sees Jack rapping about his first-hand experience with white privilege.

== Composition ==
The track sees a typical use of a hip hop beat alongside a sample from Jade's September 1994, "When Will I See You Again". Furthermore, the track sees a heavy use of snares over a stretched vocal over 100 seconds.

== Music and lyrics ==
On the track, Jack addresses white privilege in the music industry alongside discussing cultural appropriation. Jack is seen "[taking] aim at the mainstream media, specifically the “suburban kids” who go on to become rap journalists."

== Critical reception ==
Writing for Clash, Robin Murray noted that the track "is fantastic" and is "a ruthless meditation on authenticity that finds Jack Harlow spitting his truth for 100 seconds flat before tapping out." HotNewHipHop's Noah Grant noted that the track is "one of the most surprisingly honest songs on the album" since Jack "speaks very openly about the realities of white privilege and obsession with black culture in white suburbia." He continued to note that Jack shows "a refreshing look at the lack of “common ground” between communities and how one community’s culture is co-opted, dissected, and copied by the masses."

Writing for The New York Times, Jon Pareles, Jon Caramanica and Lindsay Zoladz noted that "["Common Ground"]'s a fleet, acute look at the ways white participants in hip-hop cloak themselves" and that "he raps about these topics with self-awareness and skepticism". Rolling Stone's Christopher Weingarten wrote that "Common Ground" is the album's "most electric track" in which Jack "examines his white privilege in a way that’s not as self-lacerating". He further noted that the track is directed toward "festival crowds, suburbanites, and the rap journalists" on the subject of authenticity.

== Personnel ==
Credits and personnel adapted from Tidal.

Musicians

- Jackman Harlow – lead artist, songwriter, composer
- José Velazquez – production, composer, songwriter
- Mike Washington Jr. – production, composer, songwriter
- Jaysoul – production, composer, songwriter
- Aniko Thomas – production, composer, songwriter
- Joi Marshall – songwriter
- Tonya Kelly – songwriter
- Diyelle Reed – songwriter
- Emanuel Officer – songwriter

Technical

- Chris Athens – mastering engineer
- Nickie Jon Pabón – mixing engineer
- Nickie Jon Pabón – recording engineer

== Charts ==
Chart performance for "Common Ground"
Chart (2023)	Peak position
Canada Hot 100 (Billboard)	76
New Zealand Hot Singles (RMNZ)	6
US Billboard Hot 100	96
US Hot R&B/Hip-Hop Songs (Billboard)	28
