= Trade Places =

2026 single by Jack Harlow

Single by Jack Harlow

from the album Monica
- Released: March 13, 2026
- Studio: Electric Lady, New York City
- Genre: R&B
- Length: 3:02
- Label: Atlantic
- Songwriters: Jackman Harlow; Aksel Arvid; Clayborn Harlow; Dawoyne Lawson; Nickie Jon Pabón; Franklin Rankin; Jose Velazquez
- Producers: 2forwOyNE; Arvid; BabeTruth; Harlow; Rankin

Jack Harlow singles chronology
"Just Us" (2025)	"Trade Places" (2026)

Music video
- "Trade Places" on YouTube

"Trade Places" is a song by American rapper Jack Harlow. It was sent to Italian contemporary hit radio on March 13, 2026, as the lead single from his fourth studio album, Monica, which was released on the same day. It is the album's opening track and was produced by 2forwOyNE, Aksel Arvid, BabeTruth, Clay Harlow and Frank Rankin.

== Composition ==
"Trade Places" is an R&B-inspired song. The production contains warm organs and saxophone set over a smooth tempo, along with a "caramel-sticky beat" and "taut bass line". Performing with a half-spoken vocal and relaxed, melodic delivery, Jack Harlow sings about wanting to be close with a woman that he is romantically attracted to. Notably, he wishes to trade places with objects that she would lean on or touch, such as a fence, lamppost and handrail.

== Critical reception ==
The song received generally positive reviews. Mike DeWald of Riff wrote it "unfolds with an intimate, understated groove." Clash's Robin Murray called it "wonderful", writing "Jack sits back from the mic, the intimacy pushing you to turn the volume up in an attempt to become involved in his world. Painterly daubs of Hammond B-3 splash across the canvas, the track representing a soulful break from the past – a refreshing blast of cold water to the face, it inaugurates a project dominated by feeling and groove." Reviewing Monica for InBetweenDrafts, Jon Negroni opined that the song is as "about as perfect an opening statement as Harlow could have designed" and stated that the concept "almost works" because the production "carries the weight of true, unadulterated longing. Harlow has never sounded this comfortable being uncomfortable." Pitchfork's Alphonse Pierre described the song as "flirting that would be too chaste even for Bible camp", while Jeff Ihaza of Rolling Stone found it "romantic, a little corny, and disarmingly sincere."

== Music video ==
The music video was released alongside the song. It sees Jack Harlow walking down the streets and meeting up with his love interest.

== Charts ==
Chart performance for "Trade Places"
Chart (2026)	Peak position
Australia Hip Hop/R&B (ARIA)	21
Canada Hot 100 (Billboard)	89
New Zealand Hot Singles (RMNZ)	6
US Billboard Hot 100	91
US Hot R&B/Hip-Hop Songs (Billboard)	21
