= They Don't Love It =

2023 single by Jack Harlow

Single by Jack Harlow

from the album Jackman
- Released: April 28, 2023
- Genre: Hip hop
- Length: 1:53
- Label: Generation Now; Atlantic
- Songwriters: Jackman Harlow; Kameron Cole; Timothy Wright
- Producer: Hollywood Cole

Jack Harlow singles chronology
"Backstage Passes" (2022)	"They Don't Love It" (2023)	"3D" (2023)

Music video
- "They Don't Love It" on YouTube

"They Don't Love It" is a song by American rapper Jack Harlow. It was sent to Italian contemporary hit radio through Generation Now and Atlantic Records as the lead single from his self-titled third studio album, Jackman, on April 28, 2023, along with the album. Harlow wrote the song with producer Kameron Cole. The song prominently samples "Can't Live Without You" by Connie Laverne, and as a result, its songwriter, gospel singer Timothy Wright, is also credited.

== Composition and lyrics ==
The song received attention for Harlow saying that he is the "hardest white boy" since previous collaborator, fellow American rapper Eminem. He subtly compares himself to the rapper in the lines: "Ya boy's strivin' to be the most dominant ever / The hardest white boy since the one who rapped about vomit and sweaters", a similar line used by the rapper G-Eazy on the 2015 song "Calm Down" by saying: "And fuck it I'm the coldest white rapper in the game since the one with the bleached hair". The lines refer to Eminem rapping about vomiting after eating spaghetti that his mother made due to nervousness before participating in a rap battle on stage. The lyrics received generally negative reviews from fans on social media, who felt that the late Mac Miller was more deserving of the title that Harlow gave himself. Aaron Williams of Uproxx defended Harlow by saying: "And while, truthfully, 'best white rapper' is very much subjective, you have to admire the moxy Jack shows in making such a claim — and the smarts. There's no better promotion than some good, old-fashioned water cooler talk". Other than the incident, the song "bursts out of the traps, the high-pitched vocal distortions aligned to free-flowing rhymes from the Kentucky artist". Fellow white rapper Machine Gun Kelly responded to the Eminem lyrics a few days later, stating that Harlow "jacked man's whole swag" and "Give Drake his flow back".

== Music video ==
The official music video for "They Don't Love It", directed by Eliel Ford, was released on May 1, 2023. Harlow takes viewers through his hometown of Louisville, Kentucky as he visits his old schools (Bloom Elementary, Highland Middle School, and Atherton High School), plays soccer, and barbecues with his family and friends. He also visits a local bookstore and sets fireworks in the field that he is playing at with his friends, while others warmly welcome him to the city. Harlow also raps in a parking lot of a strip mall and hugs thrift store owners. He sports a Kentucky Boy Tyler jacket as he rides in the back of a truck.

== Charts ==
Chart performance for "They Don't Love It"
Chart (2023)	Peak position
Australia New Music Singles (ARIA)	20
Australia Hip Hop/R&B (ARIA)	30
Canada Hot 100 (Billboard)	40
Global 200 (Billboard)	100
Ireland (IRMA)	56
New Zealand Hot Singles (RMNZ)	2
UK Singles (OCC)	76
US Billboard Hot 100	54
US Hot R&B/Hip-Hop Songs (Billboard)	17
