= Lovin on Me =

2023 single by Jack Harlow

Single by Jack Harlow
- Released: November 10, 2023
- Recorded: 2023
- Genre: Pop rap
- Length: 2:18
- Label: Generation Now; Atlantic
- Songwriters: Jackman Harlow; Ozan Yildirim; Sean Momberger; Nik Frascona; Nickie Jon Pabón; Delbert M Greer; Reginald Nelton
- Producers: Oz; Momberger; Nik D

Jack Harlow singles chronology
"3D" (2023)	"Lovin on Me" (2023)	"Stop Giving Me Advice" (2023)

Music video
- "Lovin on Me" on YouTube

"Lovin on Me" is a song by American rapper Jack Harlow. It was released through Generation Now and Atlantic Records as a single on November 10, 2023. Harlow wrote the song with producers Oz, Sean Momberger, and Nik D, alongside Nickie Jon Pabón and Reginald Nelton. The song samples the 1995 R&B track "Whatever (Bass Soliloquy)" by Cadillac Dale. Prior to its release, a snippet of the song went viral on TikTok. The song became a global hit, and topped the Billboard Hot 100 chart for six non-consecutive weeks. The music video for the song was released the same day.

== Background and release ==
Harlow originally teased "Lovin on Me" in November 2023, through a snippet on TikTok, which went viral. On November 6, he announced the single would be releasing later in the week. The announcement accompanied news Harlow would embark on "No Place Like Home", a six-city tour exclusive to his home state of Kentucky.

The single and its accompanying music video were both released on November 10, 2023, with Harlow declaring "Lovin on Me" as the beginning of a "new era" for his career.

== Composition and lyrics ==
"Lovin on Me" is a pop rap track. It samples the 1995 R&B song "Whatever (Bass Solique)" by Cadillac Dale, repurposing its chorus. Lyrically, the single opens with "I'm vanilla baby / I'll choke you, but I'm no killer baby". On its verses, Harlow raps flirtatiously toward a potential lover.

== Music video ==
Directed by Aidan Cullen, an accompanying music video was released concurrently with the single. Sporting a mullet and against multicolored backgrounds, Harlow is featured wearing a Wu-Tang Clan t-shirt, a Haunted Starbucks football jersey and New Balance joggers. He is also seen dancing along with his friends, as well as cuddling a puppy.

== Critical reception ==
The single was positively reviewed by Hershal Pandya of Vulture who wrote that the song is an earworm, stating "Harlow rides the pocket of the song's hyphy percussion with charismatic ease". Comparing the beat to "vintage Too $hort", Pandya added that the single's accompanying music video was "chock-full of all the quintessential Harlow-isms that make him such a divisive figure", including "groan-worthy bars", "doing something annoyingly on brand like cuddling a puppy", "a surprisingly nimble flow and impeccable beat selection".

== Commercial performance ==
"Lovin on Me" debuted at number two on the Billboard Hot 100, reaching number one the following week. It is Harlow's third overall number-one song and second solo, as well as his fourth top five overall. The track spent six weeks at number one, surpassing the run at the top of his 2022 single "First Class".

== Charts ==
=== Weekly charts ===
Weekly chart performance for "Lovin on Me"
Chart (2023–2024)	Peak position
Australia (ARIA)	1
Australia Hip Hop/R&B (ARIA)	1
Austria (Ö3 Austria Top 40)	6
Belarus Airplay (TopHit)	28
Belgium (Ultratop 50 Flanders)	38
Belgium (Ultratop 50 Wallonia)	21
Bulgaria Airplay (PROPHON)	4
Canada Hot 100 (Billboard)	1
Canada CHR/Top 40 (Billboard)	1
CIS Airplay (TopHit)	9
Czech Republic Airplay (ČNS IFPI)	6
Czech Republic Singles Digital (ČNS IFPI)	27
Denmark (Tracklisten)	4
Estonia Airplay (TopHit)	6
Finland (Suomen virallinen lista)	15
France (SNEP)	40
Germany (GfK)	4
Global 200 (Billboard)	1
Greece International (IFPI)	4
Iceland (Tónlistinn)	5
Ireland (IRMA)	2
Israel (Mako Hitlist)	46
Italy (FIMI)	70
Japan Hot Overseas (Billboard Japan)	18
Kazakhstan Airplay (TopHit)	18
Latvia (LaIPA)	1
Latvia Airplay (LaIPA)	12
Lebanon Airplay (Lebanese Top 20)	12
Lithuania (AGATA)	2
Lithuania Airplay (TopHit)	1
Luxembourg (Billboard)	6
Moldova Airplay (TopHit)	179
Netherlands (Dutch Top 40)	27
Netherlands (Single Top 100)	6
New Zealand (Recorded Music NZ)	1
Nigeria (TurnTable Top 100)	18
Norway (VG-lista)	4
Poland (Polish Streaming Top 100)	59
Portugal (AFP)	35
Romania Airplay (Media Forest)	7
Russia Airplay (TopHit)	19
San Marino (SMRTV Top 50)	15
Singapore (RIAS)	20
Slovakia Airplay (ČNS IFPI)	35
Slovakia Singles Digital (ČNS IFPI)	16
South Africa Streaming (TOSAC)	5
Suriname (Nationale Top 40)	15
Sweden (Sverigetopplistan)	7
Switzerland (Schweizer Hitparade)	4
Turkey International Airplay (Radiomonitor Türkiye)	9
Ukraine Airplay (TopHit)	166
UAE (IFPI)	3
UK Singles (Official Charts)	1
UK Hip Hop/R&B (Official Charts)	1
US Billboard Hot 100	1
US Adult Pop Airplay (Billboard)	11
US Hot R&B/Hip-Hop Songs (Billboard)	1
US Pop Airplay (Billboard)	1
US Rhythmic Airplay (Billboard)	1

=== Monthly charts ===
Monthly chart performance for "Lovin on Me"
Chart (2024)	Peak position
Belarus Airplay (TopHit)	38
CIS Airplay (TopHit)	14
Czech Republic (Rádio Top 100)	7
Czech Republic (Singles Digitál Top 100)	30
Estonia Airplay (TopHit)	10
Kazakhstan Airplay (TopHit)	19
Latvia Airplay (TopHit)	1
Lithuania Airplay (TopHit)	1
Romania Airplay (TopHit)	22
Russia Airplay (TopHit)	27
Slovakia (Rádio Top 100)	35
Slovakia (Singles Digitál Top 100)	14

=== Year-end charts ===
Year-end chart performance for "Lovin on Me"
Chart (2024)	Position
Australia (ARIA)	17
Australia Hip Hop/R&B (ARIA)	2
Belarus Airplay (TopHit)	83
Canada (Canadian Hot 100)	10
CIS Airplay (TopHit)	22
Denmark (Tracklisten)	83
Estonia Airplay (TopHit)	85
Germany (GfK)	53
Global 200 (Billboard)	20
Kazakhstan Airplay (TopHit)	42
New Zealand (Recorded Music NZ)	13
Russia Airplay (TopHit)	51
Switzerland (Schweizer Hitparade)	73
UK Singles (OCC)	28
US Billboard Hot 100	5
US Adult Top 40 (Billboard)	34
US Hot R&B/Hip-Hop Songs (Billboard)	2
US R&B/Hip-Hop Airplay (Billboard)	11
US Mainstream Top 40 (Billboard)	3
US Rhythmic (Billboard)	1

== Certifications ==
Certifications for "Lovin on Me"
Region	Certification	Certified units/sales
Australia (ARIA)	6× Platinum	420,000^{‡}
Austria (IFPI Austria)	Gold	15,000^{‡}
Belgium (BRMA)	Platinum	40,000^{‡}
Canada (Music Canada)	7× Platinum	560,000^{‡}
Denmark (IFPI Danmark)	Gold	45,000^{‡}
France (SNEP)	Gold	100,000^{‡}
Germany (BVMI)	Gold	300,000^{‡}
Italy (FIMI)	Gold	50,000^{‡}
New Zealand (RMNZ)	3× Platinum	90,000^{‡}
Poland (ZPAV)	Platinum	50,000^{‡}
Switzerland (IFPI Switzerland)	Platinum	30,000^{‡}
United Kingdom (BPI)	2× Platinum	1,200,000^{‡}
United States (RIAA)	4× Platinum	4,000,000^{‡}
^{‡} Sales+streaming figures based on certification alone.

== Release history ==
Release dates and formats for "Lovin on Me"
Region	Date	Format(s)	Label	Ref.
Italy	November 10, 2023	Contemporary hit radio	Warner	
United States	January 2024	CD	Warner	
United States	May 13, 2024	Vinyl	Warner	
