= Nail Tech =

2022 single by Jack Harlow

Single by Jack Harlow

from the album Come Home the Kids Miss You
- Released: February 18, 2022
- Length: 3:26
- Label: Atlantic; Generation Now
- Songwriters: Jackman Harlow; Matthew Samuels; Rogét Chahayed; Jahaan Sweet; Scotty Coleman; José Velazquez; Amir Sims; Douglas Ford; Montez Jones
- Producers: Boi-1da; Chahayed; Sweet; Coleman; BabeTruth; Fierce

Jack Harlow singles chronology
"White Lies" (2021)	"Nail Tech" (2022)	"First Class" (2022)

Music video
- "Nail Tech" on YouTube

"Nail Tech" is a song by American rapper Jack Harlow, released on February 18, 2022, through labels Atlantic Records and Generation Now. The song was produced by Boi-1da, Rogét Chahayed, Jahaan Sweet, Coleman, Babetruth, and Fierce, with extra production by American singer-songwriter John Mayer. It is the lead single from Harlow's second album Come Home the Kids Miss You, released on May 6, 2022. Many have compared the brass-heavy instrumental and flow to Jack's Appearance on Lil Nas X's Industry Baby.

== Personnel ==
- Songwriters: Jackman Harlow, Matthew Samuels, Rogét Chahayed, Jahaan Sweet, Scotty Coleman, José Velazquez, Amir Sims, Douglas Ford, Montez Jones
- Producers: Boi-1da, Rogét Chahayed, Jahaan Sweet, Rogét Coleman, BabeTruth, Fierce
- Additional producer: John Mayer
- Mixing engineers: Nickie Jon Pabón, Patrizio "Teezio" Pigliapoco
- Assistant mix engineer: Ignacio Portales
- Recording engineer: Nickie Jon Pabón
- Trumpet and Trombone: Ryan Svendsen

== Charts ==
=== Weekly charts ===
Weekly chart performance for "Nail Tech"
Chart (2022)	Peak position
Australia (ARIA)	22
Canada Hot 100 (Billboard)	11
Global 200 (Billboard)	23
Greece International (IFPI)	52
Ireland (IRMA)	28
Lithuania (AGATA)	89
New Zealand (Recorded Music NZ)	26
Portugal (AFP)	132
South Africa Streaming (TOSAC)	43
Sweden Heatseeker (Sverigetopplistan)	8
UK Singles (OCC)	55
UK Hip Hop/R&B (OCC)	29
US Billboard Hot 100	18
US Hot R&B/Hip-Hop Songs (Billboard)	4
US Rhythmic Airplay (Billboard)	14

=== Year-end charts ===
2022 year-end chart performance for "Nail Tech"
Chart (2022)	Position
US Hot R&B/Hip-Hop Songs (Billboard)	45

== Certifications ==
Region	Certification	Certified units/sales
New Zealand (RMNZ)	Gold	15,000^{‡}
United States (RIAA)	Platinum	1,000,000^{‡}
^{‡} Sales+streaming figures based on certification alone.

== Release history ==
Release history and formats for "Nail Tech"
Region	Date	Format	Label	Ref.
Various	February 18, 2022	Digital download; streaming	Atlantic; Generation Now	
Italy	February 18, 2022	Contemporary hit radio	Warner	
United States	March 8, 2022	Rhythmic contemporary	Atlantic; Generation Now	
United States	March 8, 2022	Urban contemporary radio	Atlantic; Generation Now	
