= Come Home the Kids Miss You =

Studio album by Jack Harlow
- Released: May 6, 2022
- Genres: Hip-hop; pop rap
- Length: 45:04
- Labels: Generation Now; Atlantic
- Producers: 2forWoyne; Ace G; Audi; Angel "BabeTruth" Lopez; Bedrm; Bobby Kritical; Boi-1da; Charlie Handsome; Clay Harlow; Coleman; Dutchboi; Fede Vindver; Fierce; FnZ; Foreign Teck; Frankie Bash; Hollywood Cole; Jack Harlow; Jahaan Sweet; Jasper Harris; JetsonMade; John Mayer; Leon Thomas III; Lophiile; Marco; Mikewavvs; Nemo Achida; Nickie Jon Pabón; Oz; Pharrell Williams; Pooh Beatz; Rogét Chahayed; Timbaland; Tobias Wincorn; WallisLane

Jack Harlow chronology
| Thats What They All Say (2020) | Come Home the Kids Miss You (2022) | Jackman (2023) |

Singles from Come Home the Kids Miss You
- 1. "Nail Tech" Released: February 18, 2022; 2. "First Class" Released: April 8, 2022

Come Home the Kids Miss You is the second studio album by American rapper Jack Harlow. It was released on May 6, 2022, through Generation Now and Atlantic Records. The production was handled by multiple producers including Harlow himself, Pharrell Williams, Rogét Chahayed, Charlie Handsome, FnZ, Boi-1da, JetsonMade, Oz, and Timbaland, among others. The album features guest appearances from Williams, Drake, Justin Timberlake, and Lil Wayne. Backed by a rich production, the album consists of Harlow's thoughts on newfound fame, relationships with women and his ambition of dominating music.

Come Home the Kids Miss You was preceded by the lead single "Nail Tech" and the chart-topping single "First Class". The album was met with mixed reviews from critics, who praised the quality of its production but criticized its lyrical substance and lack of character. Despite this, it was a commercial success, reaching the top 10 of the charts in 13 countries. It debuted at number three on the US Billboard 200, earning 113,000 album-equivalent units in its first week and becoming Harlow's highest-charting album of his career. At the 65th Annual Grammy Awards, the album was nominated for Grammy Award for Best Rap Album, Grammy Award for Best Melodic Rap Performance for "First Class", and Grammy Award for Best Rap Song for "Churchill Downs". It did not win in any category.

== Background ==
In March 2022, Harlow revealed the album's title and release date in a cover story with Rolling Stone. He also spoke about working with the album's producers, including executive producers Rogét Chahayed and Angel Lopez, to make songs that develop as they go along so that they "make you [want to] continue to listen", calling it "the whole mission" for the project. Harlow called the album's material "more serious" and his intention to let listeners know he is "one of the best in [his] generation". Harlow also revealed that he hoped to collaborate with American singer-songwriter Dolly Parton "on some hard shit" for the album, and that his management had been negotiating with hers.

== Production and themes ==
Come Home the Kids Miss You is a hip-hop album and also features pop rap. Regarding its production, an editor for Complex said that "every beat on this album sounds expensive". Another said that the album has "upbeat, catchy songs". Variety's A.D. Amorosi says that the album's opener, "Talk of the Town", starts with a "woozily" looped piano. An unannounced guest, Snoop Dogg appears on "Young Harleezy". "First Class" features a sample of Fergie's "Glamorous". "Movie Star", which features Pharrell Williams, is electro-influenced. "Poison", which features Lil Wayne, one of Harlow's personal influences, was described as "mellow, super AutoTune". "Churchill Downs", which features Drake, has a flute-led production. "Dua Lipa" is a trap song. "Like a Blade of Grass" and "Lil Secret", both co-written with Harlow's production team, are R&B songs. According to Esquire's Ammal Hassan, Harlow's influence from Drake is evident; Hassan observes that Drake's influence can be heard in Harlow's flow, melodic singing and background instrumentation. "Nail Tech" features "hypnotic reggae horns looping over futuristic laser beam drums".

Harlow's previous album, Thats What They All Say (2020), was noted for being laid-back, charismatic. On Come Home the Kids Miss You, he builds upon the same thing and additionally adds a more "potent, direct and swaggering" ambiance to it. The album features less humour than Harlow's debut, instead featuring more themes revolving around romance. According to The New York Times' Jon Caramanica, the album consists of Harlow's thoughts on newfound fame, being an object of desire and his ambition of dominating music. Robin Murray of Clash also observes that Harlow discusses issues surrounding relationships.

Amorosi said that the album's opener, "Talk of the Town", is an autobiographical and braggadocio track, where Harlow discusses his rise to mainstream success with references to his neighbourhoods and allegiances while growing up. On "Young Harleezy", Harlow concentrates on self-reflection and insecurity, asking "am I enough?". On "Parent Trap", which features Justin Timberlake, the two artists acknowledge the pitfalls of fame. Similarly, "Churchill Downs" also covers this topic, in which Harlow and Drake compliment each other. "Dua Lipa" is dedicated to Harlow's admiration for singer Dua Lipa; Harlow also concentrates on the "leaps of faith an artist makes anytime he writes a lyric down".

== Critical reception ==
Professional ratings
Aggregate scores
| Source | Rating |
|---|---|
| AnyDecentMusic? | 4.8/10 |
| Metacritic | 51/100 |
Review scores
| Source | Rating |
| AllMusic | 2.5/5 stars |
| Clash | 6/10 |
| NME | 3/5 stars |
| Pitchfork | 2.9/10 |
| Rolling Stone | 3/5 stars |

Come Home the Kids Miss You received generally mixed reviews from critics. At Metacritic, which assigns a normalized rating out of 100 to reviews from mainstream critics, the album has an average score of 51 out of 100, which indicates "mixed or average" reception based on nine reviews.

Writing for Variety, A.D. Amorosi gave the album a positive review, writing that Harlow "improves on a good thing" and "finds a heady musical elixir." Mosi Reeves of Rolling Stone had a more mixed review, opining that Harlow "doesn't seem interested in much beyond dominating the charts" and that what Harlow is trying to say is an "unresolved question." Andree Gee of the same outlet characterized it as "underwhelming".

Kyann-Sian Williams of NME felt the album "doesn't feature a bunch of seminal tracks, instead packing filler between his knockout singles such as 'First Class'," while ending their review with "you'll find a gem or two here and there, but this collection's longevity is questionable." Robin Murray of Clash opined that the album "kicks off the album in impressive style" but "the mid-section becomes bogged down in formula", while appreciating the guest features. AllMusic also wrote that "The sound of Come Home the Kids Miss You is polished and ready for the massive level of worldwide commercial success Harlow has been building up to, but it's difficult to find much substance beneath the expensive sheen", and that "Harlow's flows are unchanging and his personality comes off as one-dimensional. Lyrical punch lines fall flat and vague themes of Harlow's hard-earned road to success or his various sexual exploits cycle around aimlessly song after song."

Matthew Strauss of Pitchfork gave a negative review, calling the record "among the most insipid, vacuous statements in recent pop history" while feeling that the album is "unfullfilling, lacking standout melodies or exciting rhythms" and that Harlow "does not flow intricately or write impressively, a pop star who struggles to carry a song on his own".

== Commercial performance ==
Come Home the Kids Miss You debuted at number three on the US Billboard 200, earning 113,000 album-equivalent units (including 8,000 in pure album sales) in its first week. It became Harlow's second US top-five debut on the chart. The album also accumulated a total of 137.05 million on-demand official streams for the album's songs.

== Track listing ==
Come Home the Kids Miss You track listing
| No. | Title | Writer(s) | Producer(s) | Length |
|---|---|---|---|---|
| 1. | "Talk of the Town" | Jackman Harlow; Rogét Chahayed; José Velazquez; Nickie Jon Pabón; Dawoyne Lawson; Douglas Ford; Robert Fusari; Vincent Herbert; Calvin Gaines; Mary Brown | Jack Harlow; Chahayed; BabeTruth; Pabón; 2forWoyne | 1:22 |
| 2. | "Young Harleezy" | J. Harlow; Chahayed; Velazquez; Pabón; Ryan Vojtesak; Lawson; Nathan Ward II; Ford; Lamont Coleman; Edwin Turner | J. Harlow; Chahayed; BabeTruth; Pabón; Charlie Handsome; 2forWoyne; Nemo Achida | 3:44 |
| 3. | "I'd Do Anything to Make You Smile" | J. Harlow; Matthew Samuels; Chahayed; Bobby Turner Jr.; Velazquez; Pabón; Vojtesak; Lawson; Ward; Kensey Rankin; Dorian Washington | J. Harlow; Boi-1da; Chahayed; Bobby Kritical; BabeTruth; Pabón; Charlie Handsome; 2forWoyne; Nemo Achida | 3:13 |
| 4. | "First Class" | J. Harlow; Chahayed; Velazquez; Vojtesak; Jasper Harris; Pabón; Micaiah Raheem; Ford; Stacy Ferguson; Christopher Bridges; Jamal Jones; Will Adams; Elvis Williams | J. Harlow; Chahayed; BabeTruth; Charlie Handsome; Harris | 2:54 |
| 5. | "Dua Lipa" | J. Harlow; Chahayed; Michael Mulé; Isaac De Boni; Federico Vindver; Velazquez; Lawson; Harris; Ward; Pabón; Ford | J. Harlow; Chahayed; FnZ; Vindver; BabeTruth; 2forWoyne; Harris; Nemo Achida | 2:15 |
| 6. | "Side Piece" | J. Harlow; Chahayed; Tyler Acord; Velazquez; Lawson; Kameron Cole; Marco Bernardis; Ishmail Wells; Ford; Calvin Broadus Jr.; Pharrell Williams; Chad Hugo | J. Harlow; Chahayed; Lophiile; BabeTruth; 2forWoyne; Hollywood Cole; Marco; Dutchboy | 3:54 |
| 7. | "Movie Star" (featuring Pharrell Williams) | J. Harlow; Williams; Chahayed; Velazquez; Ward | J. Harlow; Williams; Chahayed; BabeTruth | 2:22 |
| 8. | "Lil Secret" | J. Harlow; Chahayed; Velazquez; Nima Jahanbin; Paimon Jahanbin; Charlene Keys; Craig Brockman; Nisan Stewart | J. Harlow; Chahayed; BabeTruth; Wallis Lane; Mikewavvs | 2:09 |
| 9. | "I Got a Shot" | J. Harlow; Samuels; Tahj Morgan; Chahayed; Colin Franken; Velazquez; Vojtesak; Harris; Ward; Michael Hernandez; Tobias Wincorn; Clayborn Harlow; Pabón; Walter De Backer; Luiz Bonfá | J. Harlow; Boi-1da; JetsonMade; Chahayed; Timbaland; Frankie Bash; BabeTruth; Charlie Handsome; Harris; Nemo Achida; Foreign Teck; Wincorn; Clay Harlow | 2:18 |
| 10. | "Churchill Downs" (featuring Drake) | J. Harlow; Aubrey Graham; Samuels; Tahrence Brown; Ryan Bakalarczyk; Alex Ernewein; Chahayed; Velazquez | Boi-1da; Audi; BEDRM; Ace G | 5:09 |
| 11. | "Like a Blade of Grass" | J. Harlow; Chahayed; Harris; Velazquez; Ward; N. Jahanbin; P. Jahanbin; Ford | J. Harlow; Chahayed; Harris; BabeTruth; Nemo Achida; Wallis Lane | 2:06 |
| 12. | "Parent Trap" (featuring Justin Timberlake) | J. Harlow; Justin Timberlake; Chahayed; Timothy Mosley; Velazquez; N. Jahanbin; P. Jahanbin; Lawson; Michael Washington Jr. | J. Harlow; Chahayed; Timbaland; BabeTruth; Wallis Lane; 2forWoyne; Mikewavvs | 3:10 |
| 13. | "Poison" (featuring Lil Wayne) | J. Harlow; Dwayne Carter Jr.; Chahayed; Ozan Yildirim; Leon Thomas III; John Mayer; Velazquez; Vojtesak; Harris; Ward; Tyree Simmons; Ford; Elliot Straite; Jordan Houston; Paul Beauregard; Chad Butler; Bernard Freeman | J. Harlow; Chahayed; Oz; Thomas; Mayer; BabeTruth; Charlie Handsome; Harris; Nemo Achida | 3:42 |
| 14. | "Nail Tech" | J. Harlow; Chahayed; Samuels; Jahaan Sweet; Scotty Coleman; Velazquez; Amir Sims; Montez Jones; Ford | Chahayed; Boi-1da; Sweet; Coleman; BabeTruth; Fierce; Mayer^{[a]} | 3:26 |
| 15. | "State Fair" | J. Harlow; Chahayed; Darryl Clemons; Velazquez; Ward | J. Harlow; Chahayed; Pooh Beatz; BabeTruth; Nemo Achida | 3:14 |
| Total length: | | | | 45:04 |

=== Notes ===
- ^{^[a]} indicates an additional producer
- "Young Harleezy" features vocals by Snoop Dogg
- "I'd Do Anything to Make You Smile" features vocals by Sir Chloe
- "Churchill Downs" features additional vocals by Myriam Eydo
- "Parent Trap" features background vocals by Timbaland
- "Poison" and "State Fair" feature additional vocals by DJ Drama

Sample credits

- "Talk of the Town" contains uncredited samples from "No, No, No (Part 2)", written by Vincent Herbert, Rob Fusari, Mary Brown, Calvin Gaines and Barry White, as performed by Destiny's Child featuring Wyclef Jean.
- "First Class" contains samples from "Glamorous", written by Stacy Ferguson, Christopher Bridges, Jamal Jones, Will Adams, and Elvis Williams, as performed by Fergie featuring Ludacris.
- "Side Piece" contains samples from "Beautiful", written by Calvin Broadus, Pharrell Williams and Chad Hugo, as performed by Snoop Dogg featuring Williams and Charlie Wilson.
- "Lil Secret" contains samples from "My Place", written by Charlene Keys, Nisan Stewart and Craig Brockman, as performed by Tweet.
- "I Got a Shot" contains samples from "Somebody That I Used to Know", written by Walter De Backer, as performed by Gotye featuring Kimbra, which itself samples "Seville", written and performed by Luiz Bonfá.
- "Poison" contains samples from "Poison", written by Elliot Straite, as performed by Bell Biv DeVoe; and interpolations of "Sippin' on Some Syrup", written by Jordan Houston, Paul Beauregard, Chad Butler, and Bernard Freeman, as performed by Three 6 Mafia featuring UGK and Project Pat.

== Personnel ==
Technical

- Nickie Jon Pabón – recording engineer, mixing engineer
- Patrizio "Teezio" Pigliapoco – mixing engineer
- Ignacio Portales – mixing engineer, assistant mixer
- Dale Becker – mastering engineer

== Charts ==
=== Weekly charts ===
Weekly chart performance for Come Home the Kids Miss You
| Chart (2022) | Peak position |
|---|---|
| Australian Albums (ARIA) | 2 |
| Austrian Albums (Ö3 Austria) | 5 |
| Belgian Albums (Ultratop Flanders) | 14 |
| Belgian Albums (Ultratop Wallonia) | 48 |
| Canadian Albums (Billboard) | 1 |
| Danish Albums (Hitlisten) | 1 |
| Dutch Albums (Album Top 100) | 3 |
| Finnish Albums (Suomen virallinen lista) | 2 |
| French Albums (SNEP) | 61 |
| German Albums (Offizielle Top 100) | 15 |
| Irish Albums (Official Charts) | 3 |
| Italian Albums (FIMI) | 38 |
| Lithuanian Albums (AGATA) | 1 |
| New Zealand Albums (RMNZ) | 1 |
| Norwegian Albums (VG-lista) | 2 |
| Spanish Albums (Promusicae) | 41 |
| Swedish Albums (Sverigetopplistan) | 8 |
| Swiss Albums (Schweizer Hitparade) | 7 |
| UK Albums (Official Charts) | 4 |
| UK R&B Albums (Official Charts) | 6 |
| US Billboard 200 | 3 |
| US Top R&B/Hip-Hop Albums (Billboard) | 2 |

=== Year-end charts ===
2022 year-end chart performance for Come Home the Kids Miss You
| Chart (2022) | Position |
|---|---|
| Australian Albums (ARIA) | 84 |
| Canadian Albums (Billboard) | 40 |
| Dutch Albums (Album Top 100) | 87 |
| Lithuanian Albums (AGATA) | 81 |
| New Zealand Albums (RMNZ) | 46 |
| US Billboard 200 | 76 |
| US Top R&B/Hip-Hop Albums (Billboard) | 36 |

== Certifications ==
Certifications for Come Home the Kids Miss You
| Region | Certification | Certified units/sales |
|---|---|---|
| Canada (Music Canada) | Platinum | 80,000^{‡} |
| Denmark (IFPI Danmark) | Gold | 10,000^{‡} |
| United Kingdom (BPI) | Silver | 60,000^{‡} |
| United States (RIAA) | Platinum | 1,000,000^{‡} |
^{‡} Sales+streaming figures based on certification alone.
