= Jackman (album) =

Studio album by Jack Harlow
- Released: April 28, 2023
- Genre: Hip-hop
- Length: 24:08
- Labels: Generation Now; Atlantic
- Producers: 808Charmer; BabeTruth; Boi-1da; Coop the Truth; DJ Dahi; FnZ; Gray Hawken; Goldy; Hollywood Cole; Jaysoul; Mario Luciano; Mike Wavvs; Niko; Shy!!!; Rashad Thomas; Wallis Lane; Justin Zim

Jack Harlow chronology
Come Home the Kids Miss You (2022)	Jackman (2023)	Monica (2026)

Singles from Jackman
- 1. "They Don't Love It" Released: April 28, 2023

Jackman is the third studio album by American rapper Jack Harlow. It was a semi-surprise album released through Generation Now and Atlantic on April 28, 2023. Harlow handled production on the album, along with a variety of other producers including FnZ, DJ Dahi and Boi-1da. It was supported by the lead single "They Don't Love It" as well as additional music videos for "Gang, Gang, Gang" and "Denver".

The album was mixed by Nickie Jon Pabón and mastered by Chris Athens, while Urban Wyatt created the album cover. Jackman reached No. 1 on Billboard's Top Rap Albums chart. It received a nomination for Hip Hop Album of the Year at the 2023 BET Hip Hop Awards.

== Background ==
On April 26, 2023, without any previous implications, Harlow took to his social media accounts to announce the album, release date, and reveal its cover art. The cover depicts Harlow shirtless, standing with his arms crossed in an alleyway beside trash cans in The Highlands, Louisville with a slightly washed-out filter. A noticeable hoop is attached to a garage behind him. The album is titled after Harlow's given first name, Jackman. It arrived just a month ahead of his acting debut in a 2023 adaption of White Men Can't Jump.

== Music and lyrics ==
Jackman was noted for featuring "soulful loops and boom bap production" similar to Kanye West. Lyrically, Harlow mostly reflects on "his own struggles with family, fame, and his place in the rap game" while "sometimes commenting on society at large". On "Common Ground", Harlow "addresses the ways in which some white rap fans have become cultural tourists who embrace and appropriate the hip-hop lifestyle while cloaked in privilege." On "They Don't Love It", he "boasts about his status as the best white rapper since Eminem". "Gang Gang Gang" is "a tale of how the best people in your life can grow up to become the worst people possible". On "It Can't Be", he quiets "doubters who think his skin tone is the only reason for his success" and attributes it to "his tireless hustle, attention to detail and simple good-dude energy". On "Blame on Me", he raps about "the effects of toxic masculinity on the psyches of men and boys through multigenerational perspectives". "Questions" is about "reflecting on his rise to stardom, and dealing with the responsibilities that come with fame".

== Critical reception ==
Professional ratings
Aggregate scores
Source	Rating
Metacritic	60/100
Review scores
Source	Rating
AllMusic	2.5/5 stars
Clash	8/10
HipHopDX	2.3/5
HotNewHipHop	5/5
Pitchfork	6.4/10
Slant Magazine	2/5 stars

Jackman received mixed reviews from critics. At Metacritic, it has an average score of 60 out of 100 based on 6 reviews.

Some critics praised Harlow's lyricism and authenticity. Noah Grant of HotNewHipHop wrote that "anybody who wanted something that felt extremely authentic from the rapper will be very pleased with the new release." Robin Murray of Clash claimed that Jackman is Harlow's "best, most in-depth" album yet. Christopher Weingarten of Rolling Stone wrote that the album is "a step up in lyricism that shows that Harlow has much, much more to offer". In a review for Pitchfork, Heven Haile wrote that Harlow was "aiming for clarity" with "soft, expensive beats and cloyingly intimate storytelling."

On the other hand, some critics found the album superficial and incomplete. Paul Attard of Slant Magazine pointed out that Harlow "operates in two contradictory modes: pedaling surface-level platitudes or going for easy humble brags." AllMusic wrote that the album feels "incomplete or partially thought out". Nina Hernandez of HipHopDX wrote that the album sounds "disjointed and dull".

=== Year-end lists ===
Publication	List	Rank	Ref.
Billboard	20 Best Rap Albums of 2023	19	

== Awards and nominations ==
Award	Year	Category	Result	Ref.
BET Hip Hop Awards	2023	Hip Hop Album of the Year	Nominated	

== Commercial performance ==
Jackman. debuted at number eight on the US Billboard 200 chart, earning 33,500 album-equivalent units, including 1,500 pure sales. The album also accumulated a total of 43.40 million on-demand streams of the album's songs. The album is Harlow's third top-ten debut on the Billboard 200 and is his first number-one on the Top Rap Albums chart.

== Track listing ==
Jackman track listing
No.	Title	Writer(s)	Producer(s)	Length
1.	"Common Ground"	Jackman Harlow; Joi Marshall; Tonya Kelly; Diyelle Reed; Emanuel Officer; José Velazquez; Michael Washington, Jr.; Jaysoul; Niko	BabeTruth; Mike Wavvs; Jaysoul; Niko	1:40
2.	"They Don't Love It"	Harlow; Timothy Wright; Kameron Cole	Hollywood Cole	1:53
3.	"Ambitious"	Harlow; Nima Jahanbin; Paimon Jahanbin; Goldy; Alice Sanderson; Keith Echols; Tony Miller	Wallis Lane; Goldy	2:52
4.	"Is That Ight?"	Harlow; Cole; Mario Dragoi; Gerson Zaragoza; Jason Wool; Justyn Amechi; Lauren Santi	808Charmer; Hollywood Cole; Mario Luciano	1:58
5.	"Gang Gang Gang"	Harlow; Timothy Gane; Lætitia Sadier; Rashad Thomas	Thomas	2:49
6.	"Denver"	Harlow; Michael Mulé; Isaac de Boni; Velazquez; Douglas Penn	FnZ; BabeTruth	2:38
7.	"No Enhancers"	Harlow; Dacoury Natche; Cooper McGill; Justin Zim; Ashley Leone	DJ Dahi; Coop the Truth; Zim	1:39
8.	"It Can't Be"	Harlow; Bill Withers; Thomas	Thomas	2:19
9.	"Blame on Me"	Harlow; Matthew Samuels; Ryan Hawken; Velazquez; Cole	Boi-1da; Gray Hawken; BabeTruth; Hollywood Cole	4:01
10.	"Questions"	Harlow; Joshua McBride	Shy!!!	2:14
Total length:				24:03

=== Notes ===
- "Is That Ight?" features uncredited background vocals by Lauren Santi.
- "No Enhancers" features background vocals from James Savage.

==== Sample credits ====
- "Common Ground" contains excerpts from "When Will I See You Again", written by Joi Marshall, Tonya Kelly and Diyelle Reed, as performed by Jade.
- "They Don't Love It" contains excerpts from "Can't Live Without You", written by Timothy Wright, as performed by Connie Laverne.
- "Ambitious" contains excerpts from "Living My Life Just for You", written by Alice Sanderson, Keith Echols and Tony Miller, as performed by 7th Wonder.
- "Gang Gang Gang" contains excerpts from "Baby Lulu", written by Timothy Gane and Lætitia Sadier, as performed by Stereolab.
- "Denver" contains excerpts from "Do You Know", written and performed by Douglas Penn.
- "It Can't Be" contains excerpts from "I Love You Dawn", written and performed by Bill Withers.
- "Blame on Me" contains excerpts from "Blame", written by Ryan Hawken, as performed by Gray Hawken.

== Charts ==
=== Weekly charts ===
Weekly chart performance for Jackman
Chart (2023)	Peak position
Australian Albums (ARIA)	11
Australian Hip Hop/R&B Albums (ARIA)	3
Austrian Albums (Ö3 Austria)	27
Belgian Albums (Ultratop Flanders)	28
Belgian Albums (Ultratop Wallonia)	170
Canadian Albums (Billboard)	9
Danish Albums (Hitlisten)	15
Dutch Albums (Album Top 100)	12
Finnish Albums (Suomen virallinen lista)	29
German Albums (Offizielle Top 100)	78
Irish Albums (Official Charts)	20
Lithuanian Albums (AGATA)	15
New Zealand Albums (RMNZ)	8
Norwegian Albums (VG-lista)	23
Swiss Albums (Schweizer Hitparade)	17
UK Albums (Official Charts)	32
UK R&B Albums (Official Charts)	4
US Billboard 200	8
US Top R&B/Hip-Hop Albums (Billboard)	2

=== Year-end charts ===
Year-end chart performance for Jackman
Chart (2023)	Position
US Top R&B/Hip-Hop Albums (Billboard)	100
