= Metro United Way =

US non-profit

Metro United Way is a non-profit organization based in Louisville, Kentucky, and is part of the United Way Worldwide system of 1,800 community-based offices located across 45 countries and territories. Founded in 1917, Metro United Way provides community service (Louisville metro and Southern Indiana) by engaging people to give, advocate and volunteer. This is accomplished through partnerships with schools, government organizations, corporations, organized labor, banks, community organizations, and neighborhood associations.

In July 2014, the non-profit cut funding to 15 programs, prompting critical coverage in local media. In the summer 2015, a new effort started building a social and volunteering network for people under the age of 30.

On July 12, 2021, Adria Johnson was selected as the organization's President and CEO.

== See also ==
- United Way of America
