= Just Us (Jack Harlow song) =

2025 single by Jack Harlow featuring Doja Cat

Single by Jack Harlow featuring Doja Cat
- Released: March 21, 2025
- Length: 2:52
- Label: Generation Now; Atlantic
- Songwriters: Jackman Harlow; Amala Dlamini; Brytavious Chambers; Mark Williams; Raul Cubina; Jose Velazquez; Kameron Cole; Dylan Graham
- Producers: Tay Keith; Ojivolta; Angel López; Hollywood Cole; Graham

Jack Harlow singles chronology
| "Set You Free" (2025) | "Just Us" (2025) | "Trade Places" (2026) |

Doja Cat singles chronology
| "Born Again" (2025) | "Just Us" (2025) | "Lose My Mind" (2025) |

Music video
- "Just Us" on YouTube

"Just Us" is a song by American rapper Jack Harlow featuring fellow American rapper and singer Doja Cat. It was released as a single through Generation Now and Atlantic Records on March 21, 2025. The two artists wrote the song with producers Tay Keith, Ojivolta duo members Mark Williams and Raul Cubina, Angel López, Hollywood Cole and Dylan Graham. It contains a sample of "Note to the City (Interlude)" by Boslen featuring Rascalz.

== Background ==
In an interview with Zane Lowe on Apple Music 1, Jack Harlow said he had wanted to collaborate with Doja Cat for four or five years. Prior to creating the song, he had never met Tay Keith in person, although Keith sent him many beats. When Harlow was in Nashville with Angel López and Hollywood Cole, he invited Tay Keith. The producers made the beat in front of him as Harlow wrote the lyrics. Harlow stated that when he sent the song to Doja Cat, "She immediately loved it and knocked it out, so I think it's just timing, about catching people at the right time, making them feel, you know, inspired and I think you could tell by her verse and how long it is and how many lines there are like, how many flow switches there are, like she really wanted to put her foot into it, so."

== Content ==
The song finds the rappers wishing to spend time alone together. On the chorus, Jack Harlow raps "I wish it was just us in this bitch / But they can't trust us in this bitch". Doja Cat performs the second verse, in which she details an ideal sexual encounter with sexually suggestive lyrics.

== Critical reception ==
Elias Andrews of HotNewHipHop wrote "The instrumental is chilled out yet catchy, tapping into the musical direction of both Harlow and Doja on their last albums. Despite this, both rappers provide accessibility through their verses. Harlow adopts his usual conversational flow. A few clunky lines are littered throughout, sure, but that's become part of Jack Harlow's brand at this point. Doja is more nimble on 'Just Us,' and she continues to lean on the sharper, rhyme-driven side of her sound. 'Just Us' feels like a song designed to move the needle, and given how much star power is deployed here, we'd have a hard time believing it won't do just that. Jack Harlow and Doja Cat reportedly have albums coming, and this is going to set both of them up nicely."

== Music video ==
The music video was directed by Neal Farmer and premiered alongside the single. It was filmed at the restaurant Horses in Los Angeles. Jack Harlow and Doja Cat spot each other at dinner from across the room and sneak away to be together, flirting, displaying their affection and dancing near the bar, oblivious to the people watching them. They disappear into the kitchen for private time, where they chat and Doja has Harlow pinned to a wall in one scene, as the staff is working nearby. Harlow wears a black crewneck shirt, while Doja is wearing a red sequin qipao and high heels. The clip features cameos from DJ Drama, John Mayer, Matt Damon, Nicholas Braun, Taylor Rooks, PinkPantheress and Malcolm Todd.

== Charts ==
Chart performance for "Just Us"
| Chart (2025) | Peak position |
|---|---|
| Canada Hot 100 (Billboard) | 61 |
| Global 200 (Billboard) | 96 |
| Ireland (IRMA) | 82 |
| New Zealand Hot Singles (RMNZ) | 5 |
| Nigeria (TurnTable Top 100) | 62 |
| Suriname (Nationale Top 40) | 16 |
| UK Singles (Official Charts) | 50 |
| UK Hip Hop/R&B (Official Charts) | 12 |
| US Billboard Hot 100 | 57 |
| US Hot R&B/Hip-Hop Songs (Billboard) | 15 |
| US Rhythmic Airplay (Billboard) | 10 |
