= Rogét Chahayed =

American record producer and songwriter

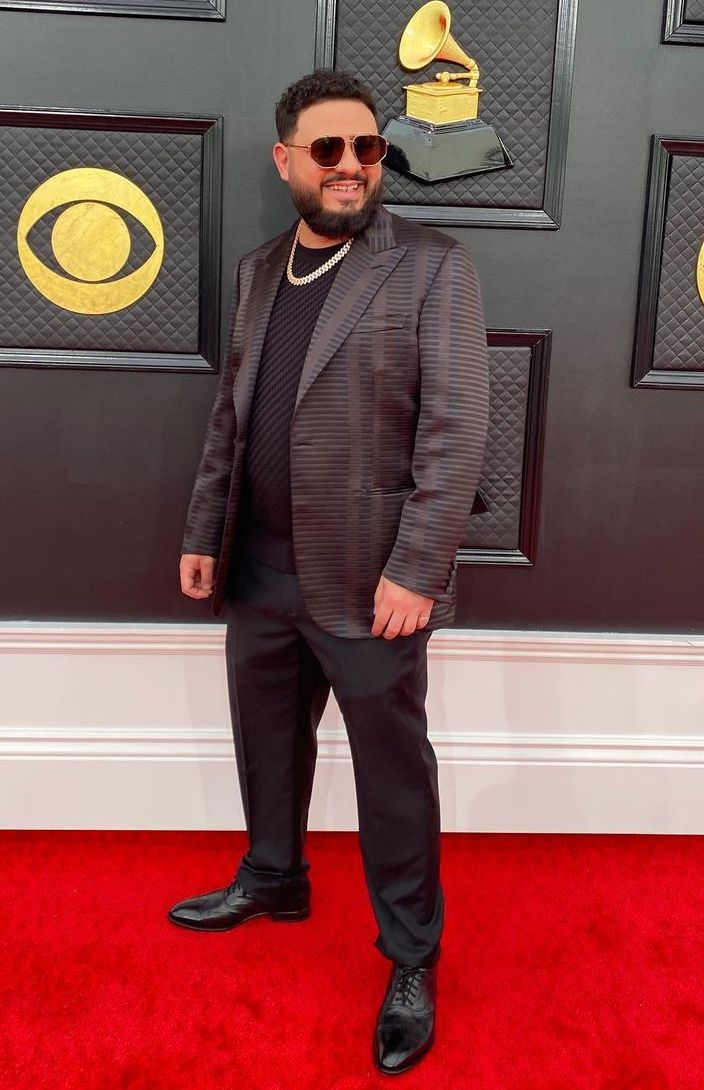
- Chahayed at the 2022 Grammy Awards

Background information
- Born: Rogét Lutfi Chahayed; May 31, 1988 (age 38)
- Origin: Los Angeles, California, U.S.
- Genres: Pop; hip hop; trap; R&B; jazz; indie
- Occupations: Record producer; songwriter
- Years active: 2010–present

Rogét Lutfi Chahayed (born May 31, 1988) is an American record producer and songwriter. Referred to as "one of hip-hop and pop's most dependable hit machines" by Billboard, Chahayed has received 11 Grammy Award nominations; in 2022, he was nominated for Producer of the Year, Non-Classical.

A conservatory-trained pianist, he began production work under the wing of mentor Dr. Dre. He was named one of XXL's hip-hop producers of the year in 2020, 2021, and 2022, named one of Variety's Hitmakers for 2021 and 2022, and Genius named him the top producer of the year in 2022.

Chahayed's credits include the hit singles "Broccoli" by DRAM, "Bad at Love" by Halsey, "Sicko Mode" by Travis Scott, "Laugh Now Cry Later" by Drake, "Kiss Me More" and "Vegas" by Doja Cat, "First Class" by Jack Harlow, Bruno Mars and Rosé's "APT.," and "Janice STFU" by Drake. He also co-wrote Miguel's single "Sky Walker."

== Early life and education ==
Chahayed was born and raised in the West Hills suburb of Los Angeles in a musical family. His parents are both immigrants to the United States: his father was born in Syria and his mother is from Buenos Aires. His sisters Andrea and Juliana Chahayed are both musicians with whom he continues to collaborate. He began playing the piano at seven years old.

Chahayed is classically trained, having attended the San Francisco Conservatory of Music on a scholarship, studying under professor Yoshikazu Nagai. He graduated in 2010 with a degree in piano performance. He studied jazz in Los Angeles with pianists Adam Benjamin and Gary Fukushima. He initially became interested in hip hop production during college.

== Career ==
Chahayed began his career in 2010 in Los Angeles working as a music director, composer, session musician, and piano teacher. As a pianist, he played at venues across Los Angeles and collaborated with guitarist Wesley Singerman on the jazz collective Los Angeles Illharmonic. During this period he worked with artists including Ron Aniello, Mocky, Jeffrey Steele, Matt Corby, Rita Wilson, and Kurupt.

In 2013, he connected with rapper Stat Quo who introduced him to his fellow Aftermath Entertainment affiliate producer Mel-Man, who became a mentor for Chahayed; through this connection, he began playing keyboards and producing for Dr. Dre. He also worked with artists including Matthew Koma, Kendrick Lamar, Taz Arnold, Miguel Atwood-Ferguson, and Wanting Qu.

In 2016, he had his breakout with the release of DRAM's "Broccoli" which he co-produced. The song was nominated for a Grammy Award and is a 7× Platinum record. Chahayed has worked with Travis Scott, DRAM, Hit Boy, Miguel, Solange Knowles, Halsey, Lil Yachty, CL, Bruno Mars, ScHoolboy Q, PARTYNEXTDOOR, Jason Derulo, A$AP Rocky, A$AP Ferg, Big Krit, Juan Gabriel, Doja Cat, J Balvin, Jon Connor, Calvin Harris, Moses Sumney, Travis Mills, Kendrick Lamar and Dr. Dre.

His hits also include Doja Cat's platinum-selling "Ain't Shit," Louis The Child and Wafia's Platinum-selling single "Better Not," MAX's Platinum-selling "Love Me Less" featuring Quinn XCII, and Joji's Gold-selling "CAN'T GET OVER YOU" featuring Clams Casino.

In 2022, he executive produced Jack Harlow's album "Come Home the Kids Miss You," and in 2024 he executive produced Jennifer Lopez's album "This Is Me... Now."

== Production discography ==
Year	Artist	Album	Title	Songwriter	Producer
2016	Set It Off	Upside Down	"Life Afraid"	check	
2016	Set It Off	Upside Down	"Hypnotized"	check	
2016	DRAM	Big Baby DRAM	"Broccoli" (featuring Lil Yachty)	check	check
2016	DRAM	Big Baby DRAM	"Monticello Ave"	check	check
2016	DRAM	Big Baby DRAM	"Sweet VA Breeze"	check	check
2016	Travis Scott	Birds in the Trap Sing McKnight	"way back"	check	check
2016	Travis Mills	While You Wait	"Believe That"	check	check
2017	Miguel	War & Leisure	"Sky Walker" (featuring Travis Scott)	check	
2017	Kesha	Rainbow	"Boots"	check	check
2017	Halsey	Hopeless Fountain Kingdom	"Bad at Love"	check	check
2017	Calvin Harris	Funk Wav Bounces Vol. 1	"Cash Out" (featuring ScHoolboy Q, PartyNextDoor and DRAM)	check	
2017	Volumes	Different Animals	"Pullin' Shades"	check	
2017	G-Eazy	The Beautiful & Damned	"Crash and Burn" (featuring Kehlani)	check	check
2017	DRAM	#1HappyHoliday	"The Christmas Song"		check
2017	DRAM	#1HappyHoliday	"Silver Bells"		check
2017	DRAM	Bright: The Album	"Campfire" (featuring Neil Young)	check	check
2017	Big K.R.I.T.	4eva Is a Mighty Long Time	"Aux Cord"	check	check
2017	Big K.R.I.T.	4eva Is a Mighty Long Time	"Bury Me In Gold"	check	check
2017	Wafia		"Only Love"	check	check
2017	Poo Bear		"All We Can Do" (featuring Juanes)	check	check
2017	Whethan		"Aftertaste" (featuring Opia)	check	check
2017	Ashe		"Girl Who Cried Wolf"	check	check
2017	Quinn XCII	The Story of Us	"60 Seconds"	check	check
2017	Louis The Child		"Right To It" (featuring Ashe)		check
2017	Louis The Child		"Last To Leave" (featuring Caroline Ailin)		check
2018	Rich Brian	Amen	"Flight"	check	check
2018	Louis The Child		"Better Not" (featuring Wafia)	check	check
2018	Travis Scott	Astroworld	"Sicko Mode" (featuring Drake)	check	check
2018	Khalid	Suncity	"Vertigo"	check	check
2018	DRAM		"Prototype"		check
2018	Doja Cat	Amala	"Roll With Us"	check	check
2018	Doja Cat	Amala	"Cookie Jar"	check	check
2018	Quinn XCII		"Iron and Steel"	check	check
2018	Ashe	The Rabbit Hole	"After Life"	check	check
2018	Ashe	The Rabbit Hole	"Sometimes People Suck"	check	check
2018	24hrs	HOUSES ON THE HILL	"LOVE" (featuring Vic Mensa)	check	check
2018	Col3trane	BOOT	"Chemicals"	check	check
2018	Col3trane	BOOT	"Movie Star"	check	check
2018	Joji	BALLADS 1	"CAN'T GET OVER YOU" (featuring Clams Casino)	check	check
2018	MAX		"Worship"	check	check
2018	Wafia		"I'm Good"	check	check
2018	Imad Royal and Mark Johns		"Heart-Shaped Box"		check
2019	MAX		"Love Me Less" (featuring Quinn XCII)	check	check
2019	Carly Rae Jepsen	Dedicated	"Automatically in Love"	check	check
2019	Carly Rae Jepsen	Dedicated	"Right Words Wrong Time"	check	check
2019	Gallant		"Gentleman (Remix)" (featuring T-Pain)	check	check
2019	Quinn XCII	From Michigan With Love	"U & Us"	check	check
2019	Quinn XCII	From Michigan With Love	"When I Die"	check	check
2019	Drax Project	All This Time	"All This Time"	check	check
2019	Drax Project	Drax Project	"Natural Selection"	check	check
2019	NIKI		"Indigo"	check	check
2019	MAX		"Checklist" (featuring Chromeo)	check	check
2019	Why Don't We	Mad At You	"Mad At You"	check	check
2019	Wafia	Flowers & Superpowers	"Flowers & Superpowers"	check	check
2019	Jessie Reyez	FAR AWAY	"Far Away"	check	check
2019	Jason Derulo	2Sides (Side 1)	"Diamonds"	check	check
2019	Jason Derulo	2Sides (Side 1)	"Best Friend" (featuring Ty Dolla $ign)	check	check
2020	Kali Uchis	To Feel Alive	"I Want War (But I Need Peace)"	check	check
2020	Kehlani	It Was Good Until It Wasn't	"Open [Passionate]"	check	check
2020	Jessie Reyez	BEFORE LOVE CAME TO KILL US (Deluxe Edition)	"Far Away II" (featuring A Boogie wit da Hoodie and JID)	check	check
2020	Alina Baraz	It Was Divine	"My Whole Life"	check	check
2020	L Devine	Don't Say It	"Don't Say It"	check	check
2020	Drake		"Laugh Now Cry Later" (featuring Lil Durk)	check	check
2020	Big Sean	Detroit 2	"Lucky Me"	check	check
2020	Big Sean	Detroit 2	"Deep Reverence" (featuring Nipsey Hussle)	check	check
2020	Big Sean	Detroit 2	"Story by Dave Chappelle"	check	
2020	Big Sean	Detroit 2	"ZTFO"	check	check
2020	Big Sean	Detroit 2	"Guard Your Heart" (featuring Anderson .Paak, Earlly Mac, Wale)	check	check
2020	Big Sean	Detroit 2	"Time In"	check	check
2020	Big Sean	Detroit 2	"Story by Erykah Badu"	check	
2020	Big Sean	Detroit 2	"Story by Stevie Wonder"	check	
2020	Nas	King's Disease	"Blue Benz"	check	check
2020	Nas	King's Disease	"27 Summers"	check	check
2020	MAX	Colour Vision	"Colour Vision"	check	check
2020	MAX	Colour Vision	"SOS"	check	check
2020	MAX	Colour Vision	"New Life"	check	check
2020	MAX	Colour Vision	"Blueberry Eyes" (featuring SUGA of BTS)	check	check
2020	Ai	It's All Me, Vol. 1	"Good as Gold"	check	check
2020	Joji	Nectar	"Nitrous"	check	check
2020	Louis the Child	Here for Now	"Free" (with Drew Love)	check	
2020	Oliver Tree	Ugly Is Beautiful	"Joke's On You!"	check	check
2020	Kali Uchis	Sin Miedo (del Amor y Otros Demonios)	"//aguardiente y limón %ᵕ‿‿ᵕ%"	check	check
2021	ZAYN	Nobody Is Listening	"Vibez"	check	check
2021	Olivia O'Brien		"Better Than Feeling Lonely"	check	check
2021	Pink Sweat$	Pink Planet	"Magic"	check	check
2021	Doja Cat	Planet Her	"Kiss Me More" (featuring SZA)	check	check
2021	Doja Cat	Planet Her	"Ain't Sh*t"	check	check
2021	Shelley FKA DRAM	Shelley FKA DRAM	"Beautiful"	check	check
2021	Juliana Chahayed		"Yellow"	check	check
2021	A Boogie wit da Hoodie		"24 Hours" (feat. Lil Durk)	check	check
2021	Olivia O'Brien	Episodes: Season 1	"We're All Gonna Die"	check	check
2021	Olivia O'Brien	Episodes: Season 1	"Keep It Movin'"	check	check
2021	Nas	King's Disease II	"Composure"	check	check
2021	Nas	King's Disease II	"Brunch on Sundays"	check	check
2021	Wafia		"Wide Open" (feat. Ta-ku and Masego)	check	check
2021	21 Savage and Rich Brian	Shang-Chi and the Legend of the Ten Rings Soundtrack	"Lazy Susan" (feat. MaSiWei and Warren Hue)	check	check
2021	Anderson .Paak	Shang-Chi and the Legend of the Ten Rings Soundtrack	"Fire In The Sky"	check	check
2021	Big Sean	What You Expect	"What A Life"	check	check
2021	Big Sean	What You Expect	"Loyal To A Fault" (feat. Bryson Tiller and Lil Durk)	check	check
2021	Big Sean	What You Expect	"Offense" (feat. Babyface and 42 Dugg)	check	check
2021	Baby Keem	The Melodic Blue	"Trademark USA"	check	check
2021	Wale	Folarin II	"Extra Special"	check	check
2021	CL	Alpha	"Paradise"	check	check
2022	Jack Harlow	Come Home The Kids Miss You (Executive Producer)	"Talk Of The Town"	check	check
2022	Jack Harlow	Come Home The Kids Miss You (Executive Producer)	"Young Harleezy"	check	check
2022	Jack Harlow	Come Home The Kids Miss You (Executive Producer)	"I'd Do Anything To Make You Smile"	check	check
2022	Jack Harlow	Come Home The Kids Miss You (Executive Producer)	"First Class"	check	check
2022	Jack Harlow	Come Home The Kids Miss You (Executive Producer)	"Dua Lipa"	check	check
2022	Jack Harlow	Come Home The Kids Miss You (Executive Producer)	"Side Piece"	check	check
2022	Jack Harlow	Come Home The Kids Miss You (Executive Producer)	"Movie Star" (feat. Pharrell Williams)	check	check
2022	Jack Harlow	Come Home The Kids Miss You (Executive Producer)	"Lil Secret"	check	check
2022	Jack Harlow	Come Home The Kids Miss You (Executive Producer)	"I Got A Shot"	check	check
2022	Jack Harlow	Come Home The Kids Miss You (Executive Producer)	"Like A Blade Of Grass"	check	check
2022	Jack Harlow	Come Home The Kids Miss You (Executive Producer)	"Parent Trap" (feat. Justin Timberlake)	check	check
2022	Jack Harlow	Come Home The Kids Miss You (Executive Producer)	"Poison" (feat. Lil Wayne)	check	check
2022	Jack Harlow	Come Home The Kids Miss You (Executive Producer)	"Nail Tech"	check	check
2022	Jack Harlow	Come Home The Kids Miss You (Executive Producer)	"State Fair"	check	check
2022	Mary J. Blige	Good Morning Gorgeous	"Love Without the Heartbreak"	check	check
2022	Jackson Wang	LOST & FOUND	"The Moment"	check	check
2022	Kehlani	Blue Water Road	"Up At Night" (feat. Justin Bieber)	check	check
2022	Kehlani	Blue Water Road	"Wish I Never"	check	check
2022	Doja Cat	From the Original Motion Picture Soundtrack ELVIS	"Vegas"	check	check
2022	BTS	Proof	"For Youth"	check	check
2022	Giveon	Give or Take	"Make You Mine"	check	check
2022	Drax Project	Diamond	"Fashion Sense"	check	check
2022	John Legend	LEGEND	"Rounds" (feat. Rick Ross)	check	check
2022	Freddie Gibbs	$oul $old $eparately	"Space Rabbit"	check	check
2023	Skrillex, Flowdan, BEAM, PEEKABOO	Quest For Fire	"Hydrate"	check	check
2023	Doja Cat	Scarlet	"Attention"	check	check
2023	Doja Cat	Scarlet	"Balut"	check	check
2023	(G)I-dle	HEAT	"I Do"	check	check
2023	Jon Batiste	World Music Radio	"Hello, Billy Bob"	check	check
2023	Jon Batiste	World Music Radio	"CALL NOW (504-305-8269)"	check	check
2023	Jon Batiste	World Music Radio	"Running Away"	check	check
2023	Lil Wayne		"Kat Food"	check	check
2024	Jennifer Lopez	This Is Me... Now (Executive Producer)	"This Is Me...Now"	check	check
2024	Jennifer Lopez	This Is Me... Now (Executive Producer)	"To Be Yours"	check	check
2024	Jennifer Lopez	This Is Me... Now (Executive Producer)	"Mad in Love"	check	check
2024	Jennifer Lopez	This Is Me... Now (Executive Producer)	"Can't Get Enough"	check	check
2024	Jennifer Lopez	This Is Me... Now (Executive Producer)	"not.going.anywhere."	check	check
2024	Jennifer Lopez	This Is Me... Now (Executive Producer)	"Rebound"	check	check
2024	Jennifer Lopez	This Is Me... Now (Executive Producer)	"Dear Ben, Pt. II"	check	check
2024	Jennifer Lopez	This Is Me... Now (Executive Producer)	"Hummingbird"	check	check
2024	Jennifer Lopez	This Is Me... Now (Executive Producer)	"Hearts and Flowers"	check	check
2024	Jennifer Lopez	This Is Me... Now (Executive Producer)	"Broken Like Me"	check	check
2024	Jennifer Lopez	This Is Me... Now (Executive Producer)	"This Time Around"	check	check
2024	Jennifer Lopez	This Is Me... Now (Executive Producer)	"Midnight Trip to Vegas"	check	check
2024	Jennifer Lopez	This Is Me... Now (Executive Producer)	"Greatest Love Story Never Told"	check	check
2024	Jennifer Lopez		"Can't Get Enough (feat. Latto)"	check	check
2024	Chlöe		"Boy Bye"	check	check
2024	The Kid LAROI	GIRLS - Single	"GIRLS"	check	check
2024	Peso Pluma & Quavo	ÉXODO	"PA NO PENSAR"	check	check
2024	Rosé & Bruno Mars	Rosie	"APT."		
2024	Flo	Access All Areas	"AAA"	check	check
2024	Big Sean	Better Me Than You	"Iconic"	check	check
2024	Big Sean	Better Me Than You	"Yes"	check	check
2024	Big Sean	Better Me Than You	"Black Void"	check	check
2024	Big Sean	Better Me Than You	"My Life"	check	check
2024	Big Sean	Better Me Than You (Pressure edition vinyl bonus track)	"Wire Me"	check	check
2025	Carly Rae Jepsen	Emotion (10th Anniversary Edition)	"Lost in Devotion"	check	check
2026	Drake	ICEMAN	"Janice STFU"	check	check
2026	Drake	ICEMAN	"B's on the Table feat. 21 Savage"	check	check

== Awards and nominations ==
Selected awards

Year	Awards	Category	Nominated work	Result
2019	Grammy Awards	Best Rap Song	"Sicko Mode" (Travis Scott) (as songwriter)	Nominated
2019	Grammy Awards	Best Rap Album	Astroworld (Travis Scott) (as producer & songwriter)	Nominated
2021	Grammy Awards	Best Rap Song	"Laugh Now Cry Later" (Drake) (as songwriter)	Nominated
2022	Grammy Awards	Producer Of The Year, Non-Classical	Himself	Nominated
2022	Grammy Awards	Record of the Year	"Kiss Me More" (Doja Cat) (as producer)	Nominated
2022	Grammy Awards	Song of the Year	"Kiss Me More" (Doja Cat) (as songwriter)	Nominated
2022	Grammy Awards	Album of the Year	Planet Her (Deluxe) (Doja Cat) (as producer & songwriter)	Nominated
2023	Grammy Awards	Album of the Year	Good Morning Gorgeous (Mary J. Blige) (as producer & songwriter)	Nominated
2024	Grammy Awards	Best Rap Song	"Attention" (Doja Cat) (as songwriter)	Nominated
2026	Grammy Awards	Record of the Year	"APT." (ROSÉ & Bruno Mars) (as producer)	Nominated
2026	Grammy Awards	Song of the Year	"APT." (ROSÉ & Bruno Mars) (as songwriter)	Nominated
