= First Class (song) =

Single by Jack Harlow

from the album Come Home the Kids Miss You
- Released: April 8, 2022
- Genre: Hip hop
- Length: 2:53
- Label: Atlantic; Generation Now
- Songwriters: Jackman Harlow; Jasper Harris; Douglas Ford; Rogét Chahayed; José Velazquez; Micaiah Raheem; Nickie Jon Pabón; Ryan Vojtesak; Stacy Ferguson; Jamal Jones; Will Adams; Elvis Williams; Christopher Bridges
- Producers: Chahayed; Harlow; Harris; Charlie Handsome

Jack Harlow singles chronology
"Nail Tech" (2022)	"First Class" (2022)	"Backstage Passes" (2022)

Music video
- "First Class" on YouTube

"First Class" is a song by American rapper Jack Harlow, released through Atlantic Records and Generation Now as the second single from Harlow's second album Come Home the Kids Miss You on April 8, 2022. The song was produced by Rogét Chahayed, BabeTruth, Charlie Handsome, Jasper Harris and Nickie Jon Pabón, and heavily samples the 2006 Fergie song "Glamorous", which features Ludacris and was produced by Polow da Don. The song went viral on TikTok before its release.

"First Class" debuted at number one on the US Billboard Hot 100, becoming Harlow's second song (and first solo song) to top the chart, after his collaboration with Lil Nas X on "Industry Baby" in 2021. It was also his first to debut atop the chart. The song also entered atop the charts in Australia, Canada and New Zealand, peaked at number two in Austria, Germany, Ireland, Lithuania, South Africa, Switzerland and the UK, and within the top ten in Denmark, Finland, the Netherlands, Norway and Sweden. It was biggest rap song of 2022 in the U.S., reaching the top spot on the Billboard Year-End Hot Rap Songs of 2022.

== Background ==
Harlow posted a snippet of the track on his social media accounts on April 1, 2022, captioning it in part "How 'bout this one next?" The snippet went viral on TikTok, with users responding to the song's "summery vibes", with the clips featuring the song gaining a total of 28.8 million views before its official release.

== Composition ==
The song sees Harlow rapping about his "journey to success" and also "spelling out what's in store for his traveling companion" over a soft piano melody, which leads into Harlow sampling the chorus of Fergie's 2006 song "Glamorous". The track also contains a reference to Euphoria actor Angus Cloud.

== Music video ==
The video clip was made available along with the release of Come Home the Kids Miss You, at midnight on May 6, 2022. Parts of the video are in black and white and it features a cameo appearance from Brazilian singer Anitta.

== Live performances ==
On May 15, Harlow performed "First Class" at the 2022 Billboard Music Awards. On June 26, Harlow performed "First Class" at the 2022 BET Awards alongside Brandy, who released a freestyle to the song's instrumental a month earlier. On August 28, Harlow performed "First Class" at the 2022 MTV Video Music Awards, with Fergie joining him to perform "Glamorous", which Harlow sampled for "First Class".

== Commercial performance ==
"First Class" debuted at number one on the US Billboard Hot 100, becoming the year's first hip hop song to reach the top. It earned the biggest streaming week of 2022 at the time, and the biggest opening week since Drake's "Way 2 Sexy" featuring Future and Young Thug in September 2021. The song spent three non-consecutive weeks at number one and also reached number one on the Radio Songs chart where it led for 4 consecutive weeks, becoming his first leader there. With three weeks atop the Hot 100, it is the longest running number one rap song in 2022. The song also peaked at number one on the Hot Rap Songs chart, as his second leader. The song ultimately peaked at number 6 on the Billboard Hot 100 year-end chart, making it the highest charting rap song of 2022 and at number 1 on the Hot R&B/Hip-Hop Songs year-end chart.

"First Class" debuted atop the Australian ARIA Singles Chart, becoming Harlow's first number one in the country. It also debuted at number one in New Zealand, making it Harlow's first solo number one and second overall chart-topping song after the Lil Nas X collaboration "Industry Baby". "First Class" also debuted at number one on the Canadian Hot 100, making it Harlow's first number-one song on the chart. The song debuted and peaked at number two in Austria, Germany, Ireland, Lithuania, South Africa, and also debuted within the top ten in Denmark, Finland, the Netherlands, Norway, Sweden and Switzerland. "First Class" debuted at number two on the UK Singles chart and spent 5 consecutive weeks there, blocked from the top by Harry Styles "As It Was". It spent 9 weeks in the top ten.

== Charts ==
=== Weekly charts ===
Chart performance for "First Class"
Chart (2022)	Peak position
Australia (ARIA)	1
Austria (Ö3 Austria Top 40)	2
Belgium (Ultratop 50 Flanders)	32
Belgium (Ultratop 50 Wallonia)	36
Brazil (Pop Internacional)	4
Bulgaria International (PROPHON)	6
Canada Hot 100 (Billboard)	1
Canada CHR/Top 40 (Billboard)	3
Canada Hot AC (Billboard)	38
Croatia (Billboard)	14
Czech Republic Singles Digital (ČNS IFPI)	14
Denmark (Tracklisten)	6
Finland (Suomen virallinen lista)	6
France (SNEP)	47
Germany (GfK)	2
Global 200 (Billboard)	2
Greece International (IFPI)	2
Hungary (Single Top 40)	24
Hungary (Stream Top 40)	15
Iceland (Tónlistinn)	7
India International Singles (IMI)	15
Ireland (IRMA)	2
Italy (FIMI)	48
Lebanon (OLT20)	8
Lithuania (AGATA)	2
Luxembourg (Billboard)	2
Malaysia International (RIM)	12
Mexico Airplay (Billboard)	18
Netherlands (Single Top 100)	9
New Zealand (Recorded Music NZ)	1
Norway (VG-lista)	7
Portugal (AFP)	11
Philippines (Billboard)	24
Romania (Billboard)	18
Singapore (RIAS)	7
Slovakia Airplay (ČNS IFPI)	58
Slovakia (Singles Digitál Top 100)	4
South Africa Streaming (TOSAC)	2
Sweden (Sverigetopplistan)	8
Switzerland (Schweizer Hitparade)	2
UK Singles (Official Charts)	2
UK Hip Hop/R&B (Official Charts)	1
US Billboard Hot 100	1
US Adult Pop Airplay (Billboard)	17
US Hot R&B/Hip-Hop Songs (Billboard)	1
US Pop Airplay (Billboard)	2
US Rhythmic Airplay (Billboard)	1
Vietnam (Vietnam Hot 100)	61

=== Year-end charts ===
2022 year-end chart performance for "First Class"
Chart (2022)	Position
Australia (ARIA)	8
Austria (Ö3 Austria Top 40)	50
Belgium (Ultratop 50 Flanders)	132
Belgium (Ultratop 50 Wallonia)	159
Canada (Canadian Hot 100)	13
Denmark (Tracklisten)	39
Germany (Official German Charts)	49
Global 200 (Billboard)	20
Hungary (Stream Top 40)	98
Lithuania (AGATA)	32
New Zealand (Recorded Music NZ)	8
Sweden (Sverigetopplistan)	97
Switzerland (Schweizer Hitparade)	50
UK Singles (OCC)	28
US Billboard Hot 100	6
US Hot R&B/Hip-Hop Songs (Billboard)	1
US Hot Rap Songs (Billboard)	1
US Mainstream Top 40 (Billboard)	10
US Rhythmic (Billboard)	2

== Certifications ==
Certifications for "First Class"
Region	Certification	Certified units/sales
Australia (ARIA)	5× Platinum	350,000^{‡}
Austria (IFPI Austria)	Platinum	30,000^{‡}
Canada (Music Canada)	7× Platinum	560,000^{‡}
Denmark (IFPI Danmark)	Platinum	90,000^{‡}
France (SNEP)	Gold	100,000^{‡}
Germany (BVMI)	Gold	200,000^{‡}
Italy (FIMI)	Gold	50,000^{‡}
New Zealand (RMNZ)	4× Platinum	120,000^{‡}
Poland (ZPAV)	Platinum	50,000^{‡}
Portugal (AFP)	Platinum	10,000^{‡}
Spain (Promusicae)	Gold	30,000^{‡}
Switzerland (IFPI Switzerland)	Platinum	20,000^{‡}
United Kingdom (BPI)	Platinum	600,000^{‡}
United States (RIAA)	4× Platinum	4,000,000^{‡}
^{‡} Sales+streaming figures based on certification alone.

== Release history ==
Release history and formats for "First Class"
Region	Date	Format	Label	Ref.
Various	April 8, 2022	Digital download; streaming	Atlantic; Generation Now	
Italy	April 11, 2022	Contemporary hit radio	Warner	
Various	April 29, 2022	CD single	Atlantic	
