= Jack Harlow =

American rapper (born 1998)

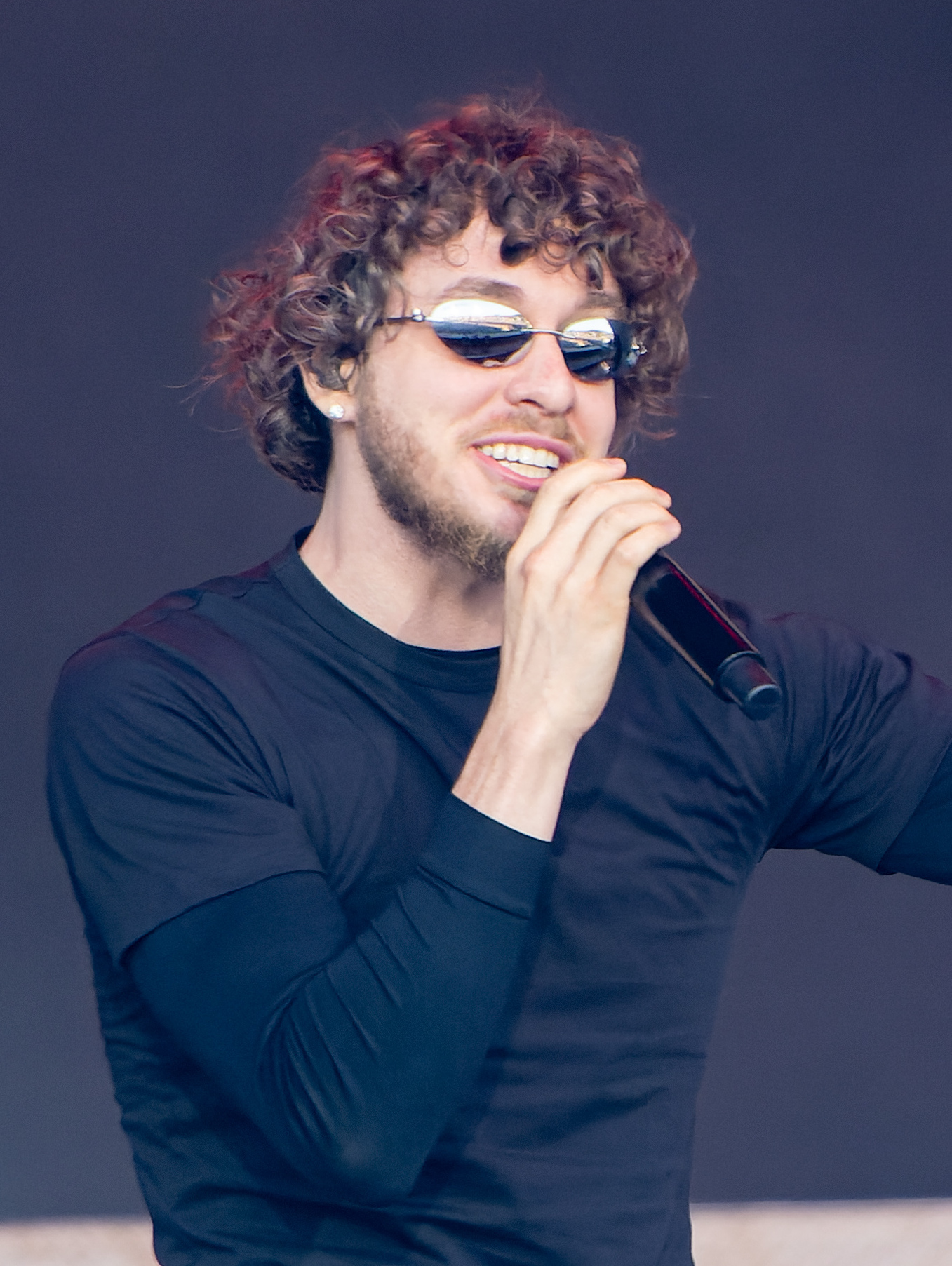
- Harlow at Glastonbury Festival 2023

Background information
- Born: Jackman Thomas Harlow; March 13, 1998 (age 28); Louisville, Kentucky, U.S.
- Genres: Southern hip-hop; pop rap
- Occupations: Rapper; singer; songwriter; record producer; actor
- Works: Discography
- Years active: 2011–present
- Labels: Generation Now; Atlantic; sonaBLAST!
- Website: jackharlow.com

Logo
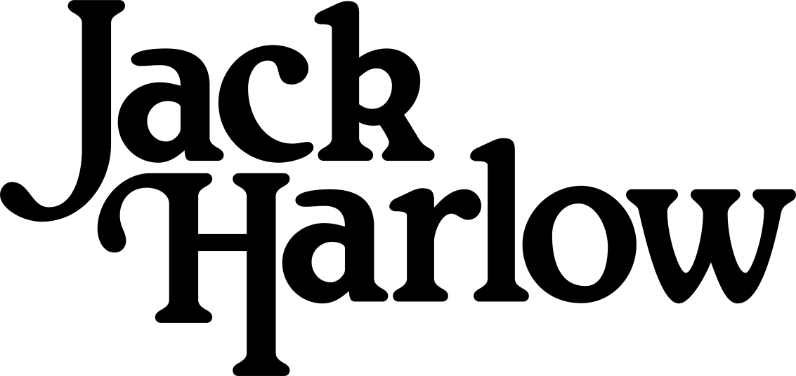

Jackman Thomas Harlow (born March 13, 1998) is an American rapper and singer. He began his recording career in 2015, and released several EPs and mixtapes until signing with Don Cannon and DJ Drama's record label Generation Now, an imprint of Atlantic Records, in 2018.

Harlow's mainstream breakthrough came with the release of his 2020 single "Whats Poppin". Aided by its popularity on TikTok and subsequent remix featuring rappers DaBaby, Tory Lanez, and Lil Wayne, it peaked at number two on the US Billboard Hot 100, received diamond certification by the Recording Industry Association of America (RIAA) and was nominated for Best Rap Performance at the 63rd Annual Grammy Awards. The song preceded his debut studio album, Thats What They All Say (2020), which received double platinum certification by the RIAA and foresaw his inclusion on that year's 2020 Freshman Class list for XXL magazine. In 2021, Harlow guest appeared on Lil Nas X's single "Industry Baby", which peaked atop the Billboard Hot 100. His second and third albums, Come Home the Kids Miss You (2022) and Jackman (2023), both debuted within the Billboard 200's top ten. The former was supported by his second Billboard Hot 100-number one single, "First Class". In 2023, he guest performed on Jungkook's single "3D", which peaked at number five, while his own single, "Lovin on Me", became his third number-one song on the chart.

Harlow has received numerous accolades, including Top New Artist at the 2021 Billboard Music Awards. That same year, he was named Variety's "Hitmaker of the Year" and was included in Forbes 30 Under 30. He made his acting debut as Jeremy in the 2023 remake of the 1992 film White Men Can't Jump, directed by Calmatic.

== Early life ==
Jackman Thomas Harlow was born on March 13, 1998, in Louisville, Kentucky. His parents are Maggie (née Payette), a businesswoman, and Brian Harlow. He was raised on a horse farm near Shelbyville. Harlow has one younger brother, and is of French and Irish descent.

He moved from Shelbyville to Louisville with his family as a child and began rapping at age 12. Harlow and his friend Copelan Garvey used a Guitar Hero microphone and a laptop to record rhymes and songs. They made a CD, Rippin' and Rappin', and sold copies at their school, Highland Middle School. When in seventh grade, he acquired a professional microphone and made his first mixtape, Extra Credit, using the moniker Mr. Harlow. He formed a collective, Moose Gang, with various friends. During this time, Harlow worked on two mixtapes that were ultimately never released, Moose Gang and Music for the Deaf. He attended Atherton High School, and played on the boys' varsity soccer team there.

== Music career ==
=== 2015–2018: Early mixtapes and Private Garden ===
In November 2015, Harlow released his first commercial record, the EP The Handsome Harlow. It was released on Gill Holland's sonaBLAST! record label. Throughout high school, he often played sold-out shows at Louisville venues like Mercury Ballroom, Headliners, and the Haymarket Whiskey Bar. In March 2016, he opened for Vince Staples in Louisville.

In June 2016, less than a month after graduating from Atherton High School, he released the mixtape 18, which was the first album on his label and music collective, Private Garden. The collective also features Harlow's frequent collaborators, the Homies, composed of Louisville rappers and producers Ace Pro, 2forwOyNE, Shloob, Quiiso, and Ronnie Lucciano. Over the course of the next year, Harlow performed at South by Southwest, Bonnaroo Music Festival, and the Forecastle Festival.

In the summer of 2017, Harlow released the single "Routine". In October of that year, he released another single, "Dark Knight", with an accompanying music video. He credits Cyhi the Prynce with helping him work through his writer's block and finish the song. "Dark Knight" became the lead single on Harlow's mixtape Gazebo, which was released in November 2017. Harlow went on a 14-city Gazebo Tour in support of the album. The Homies opened for Harlow, and the tour ended in January 2018. In May 2018, Harlow opened for indie rock band Portugal. The Man on select tour dates. The next month, he was featured alongside Lil James and Sixteen on the Skeme song "Get Sumn".

=== 2018–2020: Generation Now Records, Loose, and Confetti ===
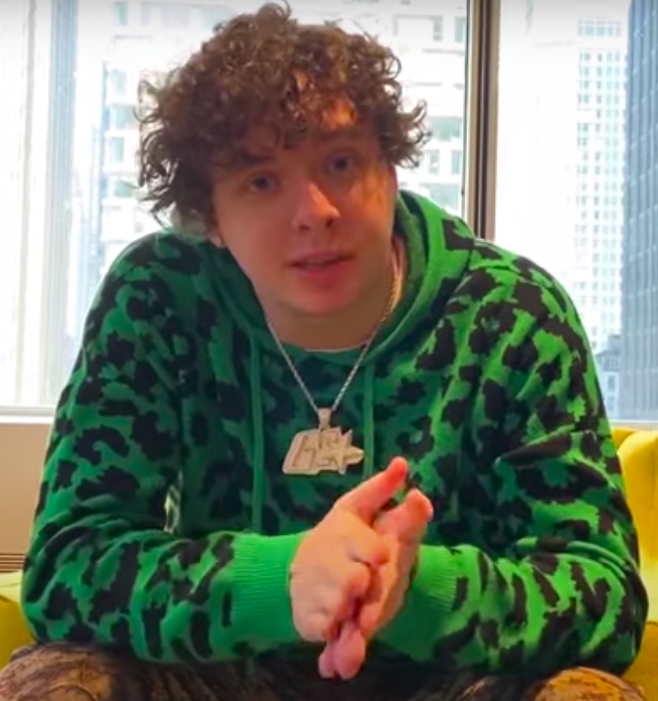
Harlow in 2020

After moving to Atlanta, Harlow worked at the Chick-fil-A in the Georgia State University cafeteria to supplement his income. Around this time, he began recording at Means Street Studio and later signed with DJ Drama and Don Cannon's Generation Now label.

In August 2018, it was announced that Harlow had signed to DJ Drama and Don Cannon's Generation Now record label, in conjunction with Atlantic Records. He also released a video for his single "Sundown" on the day of the announcement. On August 17, Harlow released his major label debut mixtape, Loose. The album featured guest verses from CyHi the Prynce, K Camp, 2forwOyNE, and Taylor. In November 2018, Harlow embarked on a North American tour in support of Loose which ended in December. That month, he also released a video for the song "PickYourPhoneUp", featuring K Camp. Loose was nominated for Best Mixtape at the 2019 BET Hip Hop Awards. On August 21, 2019, Harlow released the single "Thru the Night" featuring fellow Louisville native Bryson Tiller. He then released the 12-track mixtape Confetti, which features Tiller, 2forwOyNE, and EST Gee. On September 19, 2019, Harlow released the single "Heavy Hitter", a tribute to Louisville attorney and internet personality Darryl Isaacs.

=== 2020–2021: Thats What They All Say ===
On January 21, 2020, Harlow released the single "Whats Poppin", as the lead single from his second extended play (EP), Sweet Action. The song was widely shared on the TikTok social media platform, and the Cole Bennett-produced video has surpassed 135 million views as of May 2021. On Harlow's 22nd birthday, March 13, 2020, he released the EP. On April 29, 2020, Harlow released a collaboration with G-Eazy, "Moana". On June 24, 2020, Harlow released the remix of "Whats Poppin", which features DaBaby, Tory Lanez, and Lil Wayne. The remix propelled the song to reach number two on the Hot 100. On August 11, Harlow was included in XXL's 2020 Freshman Class. On October 22, 2020, Harlow released the single "Tyler Herro", the lead single from his debut studio album, That's What They All Say. The song received a music video that stars Harlow and the NBA player of the same name. The song was praised for the "easy, weightless charisma" of Harlow's lyrics and delivery. On December 2, 2020, Harlow announced the album. The second single, "Way Out", which features Big Sean, was released on December 9, 2020. The album was released on December 11, 2020. It also includes "Whats Poppin" and its remix. On March 27, 2021, Harlow appeared as the musical guest on the 46th season of Saturday Night Live. He performed a medley of "Tyler Herro" and "Whats Poppin" for his first set and performed "Same Guy" with Adam Levine for his second set. He also appeared and performed a verse in the pre-recorded NFT-themed parody of Eminem's 2002 single, "Without Me". On March 30, 2021, "Already Best Friends", which features Chris Brown, was sent to urban contemporary radio as the third and final single from That's What They All Say.

On May 28, 2021, Harlow released a collaboration with Eminem and Cordae for the remix of Eminem's 2020 single, "Killer". On July 23, 2021, he released a collaboration with Lil Nas X, "Industry Baby". The song reached number one on the Hot 100, giving Harlow his first number-one single on the chart. On August 3, 2021, he released a collaboration with Pooh Shiesty, "SUVs (Black on Black)".

=== 2022–present: Come Home the Kids Miss You and Jackman ===
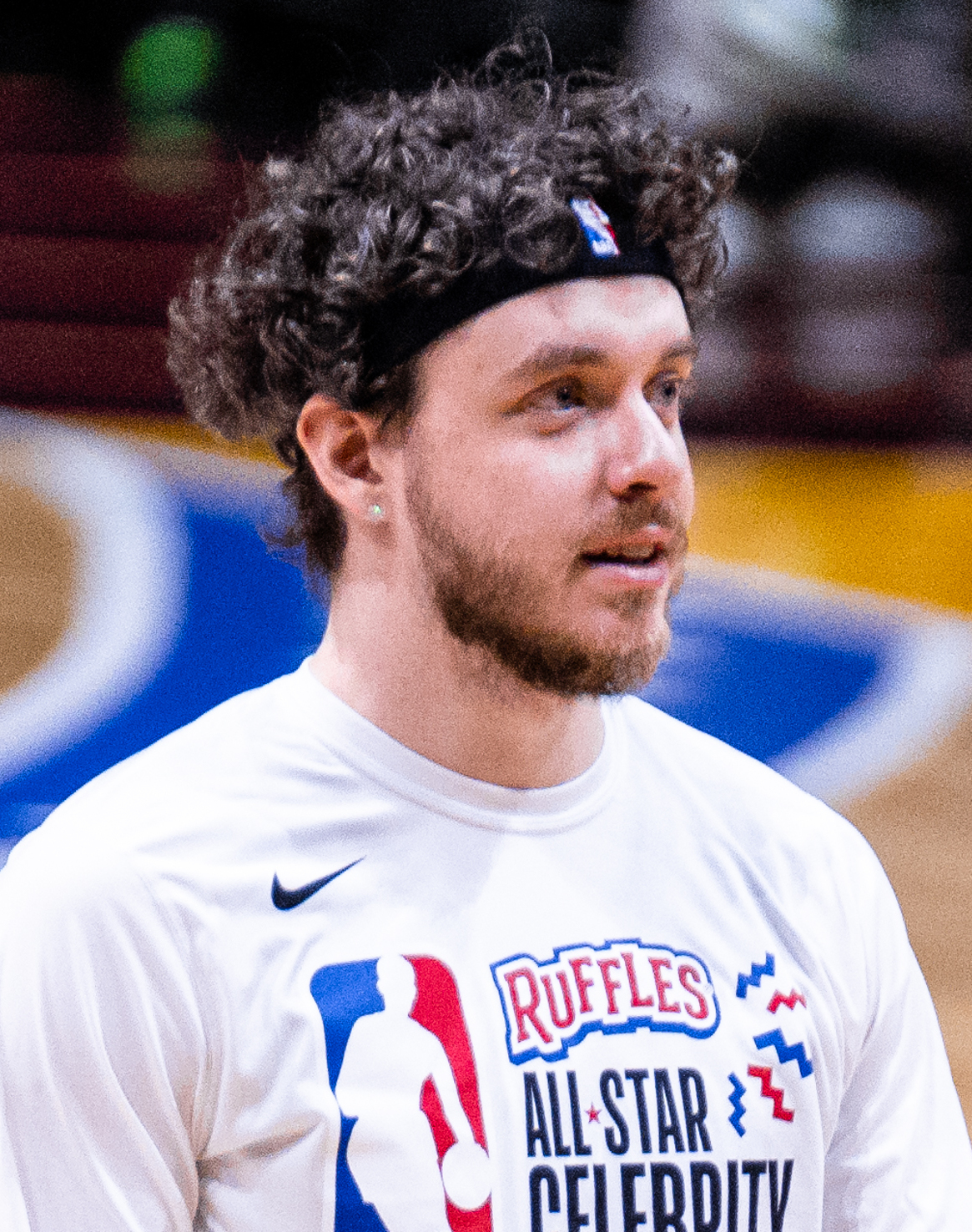
Harlow during the 2022 NBA All-Star Celebrity Game

On February 18, 2022, Harlow released the single "Nail Tech", the lead single from his upcoming second studio album and his first release in six-and-a-half months. The song performed well on the Hot 100 with a number 18 debut and peak and also received praise from Kanye West, who previously was involved in the production of "Industry Baby". On February 24, Harlow was featured in West's song "Louie Bags" on his album, Donda 2.

On March 16, 2022, Harlow announced that his second studio album is titled Come Home the Kids Miss You. The album was released on May 6. It debuted at number three on the U.S. Billboard 200, earning 113,000 album-equivalent units (including 8,000 in pure album sales) in its first week. It became Harlow's second U.S. top-five debut on the chart. The album also accumulated a total of 137.05 million on-demand official streams for the album's songs. The album also peaked at number 4 on the UK Albums Chart, Harlow's highest debut and first top ten entry. The second single, "First Class", became his second number-one on the Billboard Hot 100, and the year's first hip-hop song to reach that position.

On September 3, 2022, Harlow was the College GameDay guest picker and performer for Ohio State's 2022 season opener, a 21–10 win over Notre Dame.

On April 26, 2023, Harlow took to his social media accounts to announce his third album, Jackman, along with its release date and reveal its cover art. The album was released on April 28. It debuted at number 8 on the U.S. Billboard 200, earning 35,500 album-equivalent units (including 1,500 pure sales) in its first week. It became Harlow's third top-ten debut on the chart. It also earned 43.40 million on-demand streams in the first week. Jackman also debuted at number 9 on the Canadian Album Chart, his third top-ten debut there. On November 10, he released the single "Lovin on Me", which became his first number 1 song on the UK Singles Chart and third number 1 song on the Billboard Hot 100.

On February 28, 2024, Harlow announced the launch of a two-day music festival in his hometown of Louisville, to be called Gazebo Festival, which was to take over the Forecastle Festival's usual location and dates at Waterfront Park over Memorial Day weekend. SZA and Harlow co-headlined the festival, which was to "feature 26 acts on two stages and highlight some of Louisville's local food and culture". However, the second day of the festival on May 26 was canceled due to severe weather.

== Acting career ==
Harlow made his acting debut in the 2023 remake of the 1992 film White Men Can't Jump directed by Calmatic. In October 2022, Harlow appeared on Saturday Night Live as both host and musical guest for the Halloween episode. In April 2023, Harlow joined the cast of the Apple TV+ film The Instigators, co-starring alongside Matt Damon and Casey Affleck.

== Artistry ==
=== Style ===
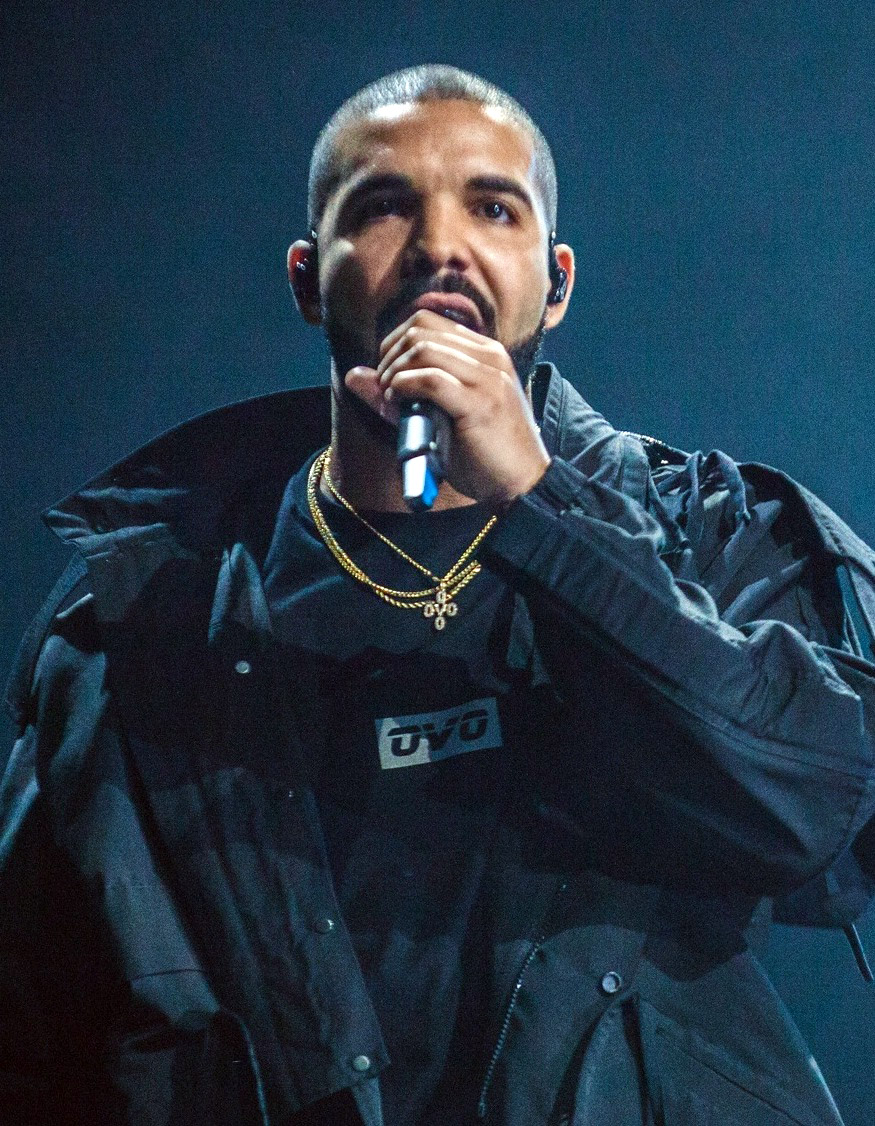
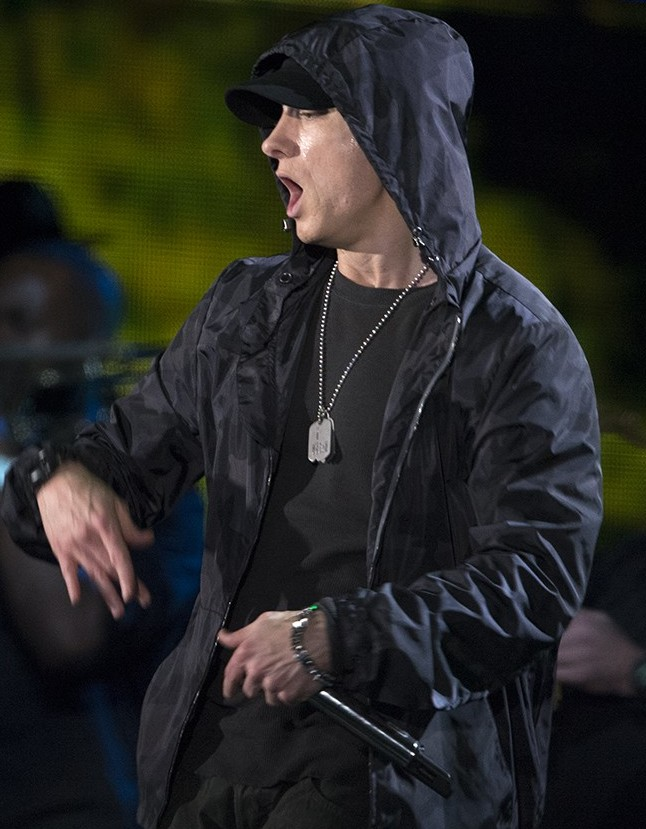
Drake (left) and Eminem (right) are two of Harlow's biggest influences.

Harlow's craft has been characterized by critics as blending playful confidence with emotional sincerity in both his music and lyrics, which often explore themes such as sexuality, partying, and drug use. Harlow's music has been categorized broadly as hip-hop. Publications have further tagged his music as blending trap beats with instruments such as pianos and uilleann pipes.

In 2020, Kate Hutchinson of The Guardian opined that Harlow's most interesting songs are his more introspective ones, dealing with topics such as being uncomfortable with his acclaim, and his white privilege. Thomas Hobbs, another writer for The Guardian, wrote that Harlow embraces "being a dorky outsider", while additionally having "enough charisma" to pull off "using language that is usually cringeworthy coming from suburban white people". He has described his own music as emphasizing rhythm, and his lyricism as being "personal but fun", and geared toward "connect[ing] with people". In 2022, following Harlow's surge in popularity, Terry Nguyen of Vox also described his music as breezy, comparing it to Drake. Nguyen praised Harlow's lyricism for its wise wordplay and for its introspective content.

=== Influences ===
Harlow cites a range of influences across multiple genres, including Eminem, Drake, Kanye West, Lil Wayne, Outkast, Paul Wall, Willie Nelson, Johnny Cash, Hall & Oates, Fergie, and Jesse McCartney, among others. Harlow has also identified cinema as an influence, aiming for his songs to be "like short films". His favorite filmmakers are Martin Scorsese, Quentin Tarantino, and Alfred Hitchcock.

== Philanthropy and activism ==
Harlow supports the Black Lives Matter political movement. He attended a rally to protest the killing of Breonna Taylor in 2020, which occurred in his hometown. Harlow has stated that, being white, he "can never truly know what [the experience of racism] is like", and that it is his responsibility as a white rapper to approach his work with that knowledge in mind.

In October 2021, Harlow donated to five Louisville-based organizations: AMPED, the Center for Women and Families, the Grace M. James Academy of Excellence, Louisville Urban League and Metro United Way. Citing the spirit and pride he holds for his hometown, Harlow stated that "People need hope, they need love", when announcing his donation plans. KFC and Instagram pledged to match up to $50,000 of what Harlow raises through the social media platform's fundraising tool.

In December 2021, Harlow teamed up with KFC and its parent company Yum! Brands to donate a joint $250,000 to the American Red Cross to support those impacted by a deadly tornado in western Kentucky.

In 2023, he founded the Jack Harlow Foundation to "reinvest, uplift and support organizations aiming to make the city that raised him a better place." That same year, he headlined a rally alongside Kentucky's Democratic governor Andy Beshear ahead of the general election.

Harlow is a Kentucky Colonel.

== Discography ==
- Thats What They All Say (2020)
- Come Home the Kids Miss You (2022)
- Jackman (2023)
- Monica (2026)

== Filmography ==
Year	Title	Role	Notes
2023	White Men Can't Jump	Jeremy	
2024	The Instigators	Scalvo	

== Tours ==
Headlining tours

- Créme de la Créme Tour (2021)
- Come Home The Kids Miss You Tour (2022)
- No Place Like Home Tour (2023)

== Awards and nominations ==
Award nominations for Jack Harlow
Organization	Year	Work	Award	Result
American Music Awards	2022	"Industry Baby"	Collaboration of the Year	Nominated
American Music Awards	2022	"Industry Baby"	Favorite Music Video	Nominated
American Music Awards	2022	"Industry Baby"	Favorite Hip-Hop Song	Nominated
American Music Awards	2022	"First Class"	Favorite Hip-Hop Song	Nominated
APRA Awards	2025	"Lovin on Me"	Most Performed International Work	Nominated
BET Awards	2023	Himself	Best Male Hip-Hop Artist	Nominated
BET Awards	2023	"First Class"	Video of the Year	Nominated
BET Awards	2023	"First Class"	Viewer's Choice Award	Nominated
BET Hip Hop Awards	2019	Loose	Best Mixtape	Nominated
BET Hip Hop Awards	2020	"Whats Poppin"	Best Collaboration (with Tory Lanez, DaBaby and Lil Wayne)	Nominated
BET Hip Hop Awards	2020	Himself	Best New Hip Hop Artist	Nominated
BET Hip Hop Awards	2023	Jackman	Hip Hop Album of the Year	Nominated
Billboard Music Awards	2021	Himself	Top New Artist	Nominated
Billboard Music Awards	2021	"Whats Poppin"	Top Streaming Song	Nominated
Billboard Music Awards	2021	"Whats Poppin"	Top Collaboration	Nominated
Billboard Music Awards	2021	"Whats Poppin"	Top Rap Song	Nominated
Billboard Music Awards	2022	"Industry Baby"	Top Rap Song	Won
Billboard Music Awards	2022	"Industry Baby"	Top Collaboration (with Lil Nas X)	Nominated
BMI Pop Awards	2023	"First Class"	Most Performed Song of the Year	Won
BMI Pop Awards	2025	"3D"	Most Performed Song of the Year	Won
Grammy Awards	2021	"Whats Poppin"	Best Rap Performance	Nominated
Grammy Awards	2022	Montero	Album of the Year (as featured artist and songwriter)	Nominated
Grammy Awards	2022	"Industry Baby"	Best Melodic Rap Performance (with Lil Nas X)	Nominated
Grammy Awards	2023	"Churchill Downs"	Best Rap Song	Nominated
Grammy Awards	2023	Come Home the Kids Miss You	Best Rap Album	Nominated
Grammy Awards	2023	"First Class"	Best Melodic Rap Performance	Nominated
iHeartRadio Music Awards	2021	Himself	Best New Hip-Hop Artist	Nominated
iHeartRadio Music Awards	2023	Himself	Artist of the Year	Nominated
iHeartRadio Music Awards	2023	"First Class"	Favorite Use of a Sample	Nominated
iHeartRadio Music Awards	2023	"First Class"	Hip-Hop Song of the Year	Nominated
iHeartRadio Music Awards	2023	"First Class"	Song of the Year	Nominated
iHeartRadio Music Awards	2023	"Industry Baby"	Song of the Year	Nominated
iHeartRadio Music Awards	2023	"Industry Baby"	Best Collaboration	Nominated
iHeartRadio Titanium Awards	2022	"Industry Baby"	1 Billion Total Audience Spins on iHeartRadio Stations	Won
iHeartRadio Titanium Awards	2023	"First Class	1 Billion Total Audience Spins on iHeartRadio Stations	Won
MTV Europe Music Awards	2021	"Industry Baby"	Best Collaboration	Nominated
MTV Europe Music Awards	2022	"First Class"	Best Song	Nominated
MTV Europe Music Awards	2022	Himself	Best Hip Hop	Nominated
MTV Video Music Awards	2020	"Whats Poppin"	Song of Summer	Nominated
MTV Video Music Awards	2021	"Industry Baby"	Song of Summer	Nominated
MTV Video Music Awards	2022	"Industry Baby"	Video of the Year	Nominated
MTV Video Music Awards	2022	"Industry Baby"	Best Collaboration (with Lil Nas X)	Won
MTV Video Music Awards	2022	"Industry Baby"	Best Direction (with Lil Nas X)	Nominated
MTV Video Music Awards	2022	"Industry Baby"	Best Art Direction (with Lil Nas X)	Won
MTV Video Music Awards	2022	"Industry Baby"	Best Visual Effects (with Lil Nas X)	Won
MTV Video Music Awards	2022	"Industry Baby"	Best Choreography (with Lil Nas X)	Nominated
MTV Video Music Awards	2022	"First Class"	Song of the Summer	Won
People's Choice Awards	2022	Himself	The Male Artist of 2022	Nominated
People's Choice Awards	2022	"First Class"	The Song of 2022	Nominated
People's Choice Awards	2024	Himself	Male Artist of the Year	Nominated
People's Choice Awards	2024	Himself	Hip Hop Artist of the Year	Nominated

Preceded by Megan Thee Stallion	Saturday Night Live Host; October 29, 2022	Succeeded by Amy Schumer
