= Whats Poppin =

2020 single by Jack Harlow

Single by Jack Harlow

from the EP Sweet Action and the album Thats What They All Say
- Released: January 21, 2020
- Recorded: 2019
- Genre: Hip hop, trap
- Length: 2:19
- Label: Generation Now; Atlantic
- Songwriters: Jackman Harlow; Tahj Morgan; Darryl Clemons; Carlos Goodwin Jr.; John Lucas; Nathan Ward II
- Producers: jetsonmade; Pooh Beatz; LosTheProducer

Jack Harlow singles chronology
"Thru the Night" (2019)	"Whats Poppin" (2020)	"Moana" (2020)

Music video
- "Whats Poppin" on YouTube

"Whats Poppin" (stylized in all caps) is a song by American rapper Jack Harlow, released as the lead single from his EP Sweet Action, by Generation Now and Atlantic Records on January 21, 2020. It was also included on his debut studio album, Thats What They All Say, along with its remix. It was produced by jetsonmade, Pooh Beatz, and LosTheProducer. The song has been credited with projecting Harlow's name in the music industry, leading to later successes such as his first studio album, on which "Whats Poppin" features. The track reached the top 10 on the US Billboard Hot 100, as well as Australia and New Zealand. It received a nomination for Best Rap Performance at the 63rd Annual Grammy Awards.

== Creation and composition ==
Pooh Beatz and jetsonmade's collaboration was their second, after working on DaBaby's hit song "Suge", with them both stating how they were already interested in each other's work prior to the creation of "Whats Poppin". The two toyed with different sounds until they were certain they had produced a perfect beat for the song, which ended up becoming one of 2020's biggest hits.

PoohBeatz claimed that the song's title came after a conversation with Harlow about how he wanted him to rap for the song, as he had been "popping shit", causing Harlow to think about the title "What's Poppin". The beat for the song was one of the first that the producers came up with, after tweaking with the original and chopping parts out, they found the final version which was a simplistic beat, following from the two's success with "Suge". They said that the simpler the beat, the better, as it allows for the artist's creativity to flourish. The use of the 808 pattern was critical in ensuring that the song had enough 'bounce' to become a hit. After this, Harlow stated that he really enjoyed working with the 808 pattern and attempted to incorporate it into his later music. However, jetsonmade made a slight alteration to the 808 pattern, which he thought was crucial in making the song sound better aesthetically. Harlow later stated that when he heard the beat that "this one of the only beats I've ever just like heard, and was like I need this right now".

PoohBeatz has also said that he has thoroughly enjoyed the aftermath of the drop of "Whats Poppin" where it has been featured in commercials, as well as the community making remixes. Additionally, Cole Bennett, a music video producer, sent Harlow a message suggesting some alterations to the song to make it more catchy, which Harlow ending up agreeing upon.

== Music video ==
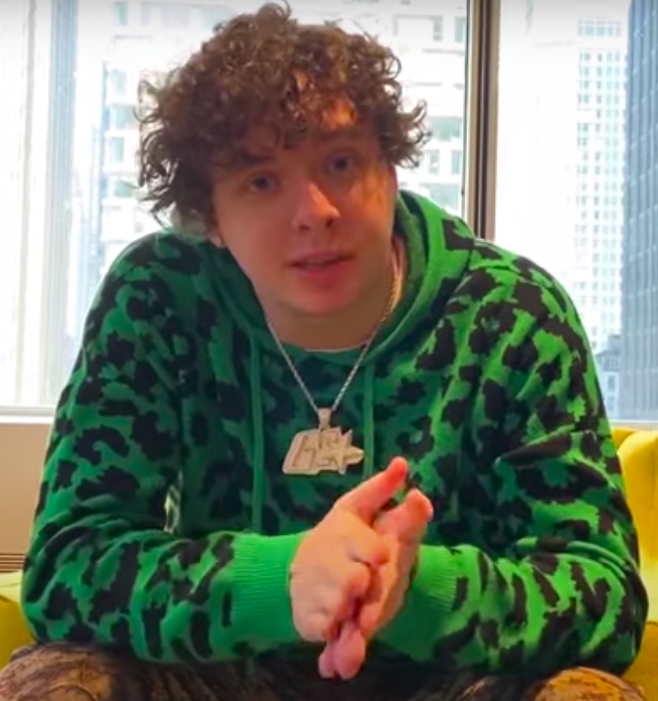
A picture of Jack Harlow, the artist behind the creation of "Whats Poppin"

The music video for the track, directed by Cole Bennett, was released the same day as the song on Cole's Lyrical Lemonade channel. It features a cameo of Ryan "Rhino" Burton of the YouTube comedy channel LoveLiveServe. As with many popular songs, the music video plays an integral part in its commercial success, resulting in exposure to a wider audience. The music video for "Whats Poppin?" was created by popular music video producer 'Lyrical Lemonade', who has been involved in the production of several other popular music videos, such as productions with 'Juice WRLD' and 'Eminem'. As of April 2021, the music video has amassed over 130 million views on YouTube. For Harlow, having this song featured on this channel contributed to the success of the song globally. Furthermore, a breakdown video on the creation of "Whats Poppin" with producers jetsonmade and PoohBeatz allowed for fans to gain a deeper insight into the song itself. Both producers have spoken about looking for a 'fresh' artist to make a new production with, after both collaborating with DaBaby on popular single "Suge".

Cole Bennett did an interview in which he dissected the music video itself. Bennett said that an earlier video of Harlow's for the song "Sundown" was "refreshing", causing him to message him on Twitter for a potential collaboration on his Lyrical Lemonade channel in the future. Bennett initially rejected one of his songs, "Cody Banks", as it wasn't the style he was looking for. He said he would only work with him if he found "absolutely perfect" song to allow the audience to get a sense of Harlow's charisma and character. The two became good friends, even throwing a New Year's Eve party together in 2019, until finally discovering "Whats Poppin" in a set of songs that Harlow sent Bennett, who instantly knew that it was perfect for his channel. Bennett was adamant on having the video in one general location, keeping the video, as well as the shooting process and budget, as simplistic as possible. Furthermore, Bennett suggested that the diner, featured in the music video, be the main location, where different areas of the diner are used in different creative lights, bringing in a unique "world" and making the video fun, such as turning the diner booth into a nightclub and a bed. Bennett said that the song itself involved a lot of wordplay, and that the best way to capture this was in various visual settings. Bennett made various creative decisions when making the video, for example the picture used in the video on the dartboard was taken on the set inside the diner by Bennett himself to get the same outfit and "feel" of where the video already was. Additionally, Bennett says the zooms throughout the video were unplanned, but he instead called in the middle of filming and rented out a zoom lens just for those particular shots, something he later admitted was a "vital role" in the video. At the end of this interview, Bennett stated that he and Harlow have a "bunch of stuff coming" following this collaboration.

== Critical reception ==
Mitch Findlay of HotNewHipHop called the track "one of Harlow's best in a minute". "Whats Poppin" featured in many top 100 lists by the end of 2020, including finishing 5th in the Rolling Stone top 100 most popular songs of 2020. The song also featured in Australia's Triple J Hottest 100, finishing as the 42nd song on the list. Alongside these, the song was also recognised at the 63rd Annual Grammy Awards, receiving a nomination for Best Rap Performance, where it was beaten by "Savage", a song by Megan Thee Stallion. The remix also received a nomination at the 2021 Billboard Music Awards for Top Rap Song, losing to DaBaby's "Rockstar", who also featured in "What's Poppin (Remix)". The song also received nominations for Top Streaming Song and Top Collaboration (Fan Voted). Additionally, The Eastern Echo had high praise for the remix of the song, saying that Harlow's personality has allowed him to attract bigger names for personality, saying that "he's wack and people love it". The addition of Tory Lanez, DaBaby and Lil Wayne on the song, whom have all achieved great heights in the industry allowed the song's exposure to grow greatly as a result. The Musical Hype gave the song 3.5 stars out of a possible 5, saying that the song displayed Harlow's confidence but lacked any cutting-edge lyrics, instead offering up cliché lyrics about sex and money. Pitchfork stated that "Whats Poppin" became such a huge success because of Harlow's likeable nature and charm, saying "he seems like the kinda guy you would find around a college campus, maybe at the basketball court". However, the song, as well as the music video, was criticised for using a "candy-coated aesthetic" to attract largely young fans, also being deemed "generic". Likewise, the song has also been criticised for its lyrics not taking much to process and not having many deep or meaningful lyrics. Pitchfork further established that Jack Harlow was more like a 'feel good' character as opposed to a clever artist, saying that the song's success is simply attributed to his ability to be in touch with the present society. The success of the original track resulted in Jack Harlow approaching DaBaby, Tory Lanez and Lil Wayne for a remix, which was released later on June 24, 2020, which also saw large commercial success.

=== Year-end lists ===
Publication	List	Rank	Ref.
Billboard	100 Best Songs of 2020	26	
Stereogum	Top 40 Pop Songs Of 2020	8	
Uproxx	Best Songs Of 2020	24	
XXL	Best Hip-Hop Songs of 2020	—N/a	

== In popular culture ==
"Whats Poppin" appears on the NBA 2K21 video game soundtrack, as well as appearing in one of the mixtapes in the game Call of Duty Modern Warfare (2019) and Call of Duty: Warzone, and in one of the Xbox Game Pass & EA Play trailers. Considering the song was one of 2020's biggest hits, combined with the resurgence of social media as a result of the COVID-19 pandemic, it inspired several internet trends and memes. At this stage, the song, including its remix, have been used in over 400,000 different videos on the social media platform TikTok. Additionally, the hashtag "#whatspoppin" has over 7 billion views on the platform. The song inspired the 'Glo-Up' trend, where an individual would show a 'before and after' video of themselves using the song in the background, whilst lip syncing to the lyrics "What's Poppin?", as if to say 'What's up?'. The song has also been accredited to projecting Jack Harlow's career. He has done several interview videos with YouTube channels such as GQ and Genius. As of April 2021, Harlow has amassed 2.2 million followers on Instagram.

== Awards and nominations ==
Year	Organization	Award	Result	Ref.
2020	MTV Video Music Awards	Song of Summer	Nominated	
2021	Grammy Awards	Best Rap Performance	Nominated	
2021	Billboard Music Awards	Top Streaming Song	Nominated	
2021	Billboard Music Awards	Top Collaboration (Fan Voted)	Nominated	
2021	Billboard Music Awards	Top Rap Song	Nominated	

== Charts ==
=== Weekly charts ===
Chart (2020)	Peak position
Australia (ARIA)	8
Austria (Ö3 Austria Top 40)	35
Belgium (Ultratip Bubbling Under Flanders)	24
Canada Hot 100 (Billboard)	24
Czech Republic Singles Digital (ČNS IFPI)	83
Denmark (Tracklisten)	23
France (SNEP)	194
Germany (GfK)	55
Global 200 (Billboard)	17
Greece (IFPI)	10
Hungary (Stream Top 40)	10
Ireland (IRMA)	13
Netherlands (Single Top 100)	48
New Zealand (Recorded Music NZ)	6
Norway (VG-lista)	20
Portugal (AFP)	30
Slovakia Singles Digital (ČNS IFPI)	62
Sweden (Sverigetopplistan)	46
Switzerland (Schweizer Hitparade)	33
UK Singles (Official Charts)	25
US Billboard Hot 100	2
US Hot R&B/Hip-Hop Songs (Billboard)	2
US Pop Airplay (Billboard)	19
US Rhythmic Airplay (Billboard)	1
US Rolling Stone Top 100	2

=== Year-end charts ===
Chart (2020)	Position
Australia (ARIA)	25
Austria (Ö3 Austria Top 40)	63
Canada (Canadian Hot 100)	20
Denmark (Tracklisten)	68
Hungary (Stream Top 40)	25
Ireland (IRMA)	44
New Zealand (Recorded Music NZ)	27
Switzerland (Schweizer Hitparade)	52
UK Singles (OCC)	96
US Billboard Hot 100	13
US Hot R&B/Hip-Hop Songs (Billboard)	5
US Rhythmic (Billboard)	3

Chart (2021)	Position
Australia (ARIA)	95
Global 200 (Billboard)	67
Portugal (AFP)	135

== Certifications ==
Certifications for "Whats Poppin"
Region	Certification	Certified units/sales
Australia (ARIA)	7× Platinum	490,000^{‡}
Austria (IFPI Austria)	Platinum	30,000^{‡}
Brazil (Pro-Música Brasil)	Platinum	40,000^{‡}
Canada (Music Canada)	Diamond	800,000^{‡}
Denmark (IFPI Danmark)	Platinum	90,000^{‡}
Germany (BVMI)	Gold	200,000^{‡}
Italy (FIMI)	Platinum	100,000^{‡}
New Zealand (RMNZ)	4× Platinum	120,000^{‡}
Poland (ZPAV)	Platinum	50,000^{‡}
Portugal (AFP)	2× Platinum	20,000^{‡}
Spain (Promusicae)	Gold	30,000^{‡}
United Kingdom (BPI)	Platinum	600,000^{‡}
United States (RIAA)	Diamond	10,000,000^{‡}
^{‡} Sales+streaming figures based on certification alone.

== Remix ==
"Whats Poppin (Remix)"

Single by Jack Harlow featuring DaBaby, Tory Lanez, and Lil Wayne

from the album Thats What They All Say
- Released: June 24, 2020
- Genre: Hip hop; trap
- Length: 3:47
- Label: Generation Now; Atlantic
- Songwriters: Jackman Harlow; Jonathan Kirk; Daystar Peterson; Dwayne Carter, Jr.; Tahj Morgan; Darryl Clemons; John Lucas; Carlos Goodwin, Jr.; Nathan Ward II
- Producers: jetsonmade; Pooh Beatz; JW Lucas; LosTheProducer

Jack Harlow singles chronology
"Moana" (2020)	"Whats Poppin (Remix)" (2020)	"Automatic" (2020)

DaBaby singles chronology
"Don't Rush (Remix)" (2020)	"Whats Poppin (Remix)" (2020)	"Stuntin' on You" (2020)

Tory Lanez singles chronology
"Can I" (2020)	"Whats Poppin (Remix)" (2020)	"392" / "Staccato" (2020)

Lil Wayne singles chronology
"I Do It" (2020)	"Whats Poppin (Remix)" (2020)	"Shimmy" (2020)

Music video
- "Whats Poppin" (Remix) on YouTube

A remix of the song featuring Canadian rapper Tory Lanez and fellow American rappers DaBaby and Lil Wayne was released on June 24, 2020. The remix reached number two on the US Billboard Hot 100 for the chart dated July 11, 2020, behind DaBaby's own "Rockstar". It stayed there for two non-consecutive weeks. It became Harlow's and Lanez's first top-ten song on the chart, as well as DaBaby's third and Lil Wayne's 25th. The remix was nominated for the Collaboration Song of 2020 award at the 46th People's Choice Awards. as well as the Top Rap Song at the 2021 Billboard Music Awards.

=== Weekly charts ===
Chart (2020)	Peak position
Canada Hot 100 (Billboard)	4
Greece (IFPI)	12
New Zealand Hot Singles (RMNZ)	3
Sweden (Sverigetopplistan)	47
US Billboard Hot 100	2
US Rolling Stone Top 100	2

=== Year-end charts ===
Chart (2020)	Position
Sweden (Sverigetopplistan)	99
US Billboard Hot 100	13

=== Certifications ===
Certifications for "What's Poppin (Remix)"
Region	Certification	Certified units/sales
Brazil (Pro-Música Brasil)	Platinum	40,000^{‡}
France (SNEP)	Gold	100,000^{‡}
^{‡} Sales+streaming figures based on certification alone.
