= Heal My Faith =

2026 song by Kid Rock featuring Eminem

Song by Kid Rock featuring Eminem

from the album Halfway 2 Jesus
- Released: October 17, 2026
- Recorded: 2025–2026
- Studio: Effigy Studio (Detroit, MI)
- Genre: Christian rock; gospel; hip-hop
- Length: 4:19
- Label: Top Dog
- Songwriters: Robert Ritchie; Marshall Mathers; Aaron Zuckerman; Willie Morrison
- Producers: Kid Rock; Eminem

"Heal My Faith" is a song by American musician Kid Rock from his thirteenth studio album, Halfway 2 Jesus (2026). The song features a guest appearance from rapper Eminem, who also co-produced it with Kid Rock. The two music artists have known each other since 1990, with Eminem appearing on the song "Fuck Off" from Kid Rock's breakthrough studio album Devil Without a Cause (1998). In addition, Kid Rock made a cameo in the music video for Eminem's song "Berzerk" (2013), and the two previously stated that they have a good relationship despite differing political beliefs.

"Heal My Faith" is a Christian rock, gospel, and hip-hop song that features rap verses from Kid Rock and Eminem, with the former's being a "more basic '80s rhyme scheme" and the latter's being more technical. In his verse, Eminem raps about Kid Rock supporting him before his breakthrough, prioritizes friendship over political beliefs, and reinforces his Christian beliefs. The song was worked on between 2025 and 2026 alongside "7 Sins", another track from Halfway 2 Jesus that was intended to feature Eminem. He recorded his vocals for "Heal My Faith" at Effigy Studio in Detroit.

The song received a mixed-to-negative perception from music critics and particularly a negative response from Eminem's fans for his decision to collaborate with Kid Rock, whose conservative beliefs contrast with the former's more liberal stance. Some music critics considered "Heal My Faith" to be "musically grueling" and "amateurish", while two of them complimented the song, mostly for Eminem's subdued verse.

== Background and release ==
=== Pre–2026 ===
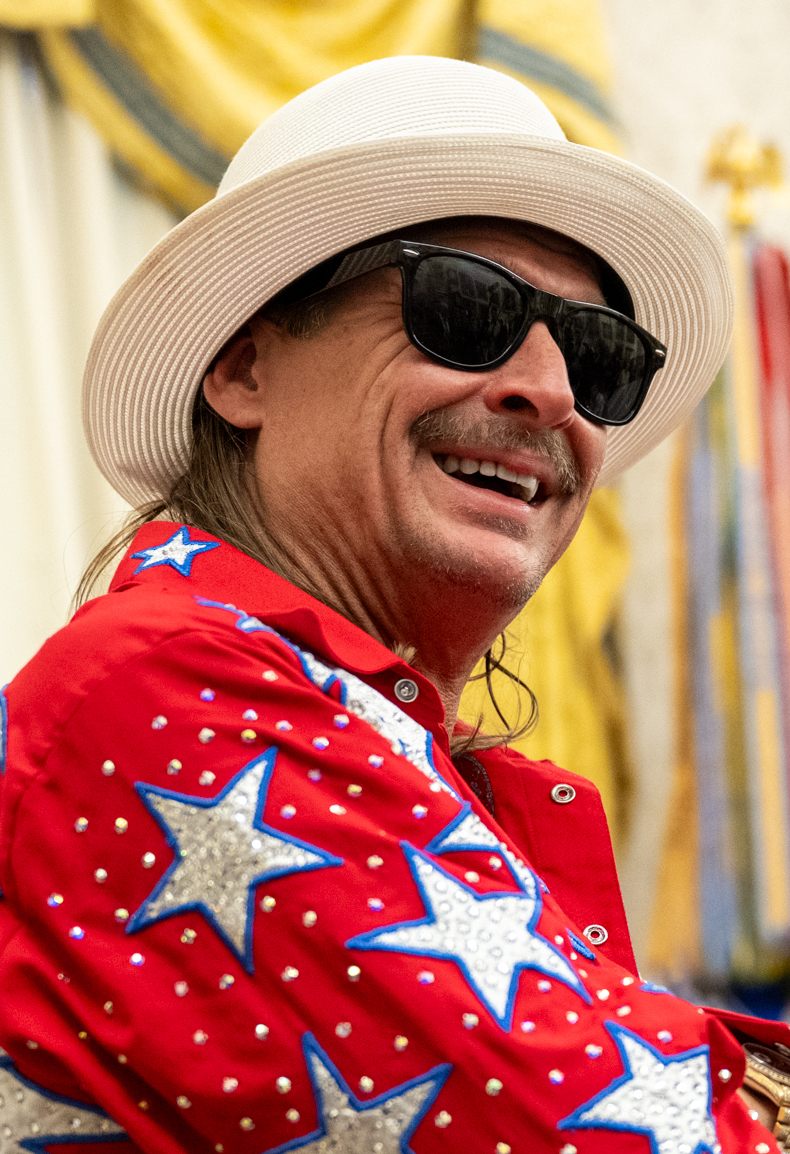
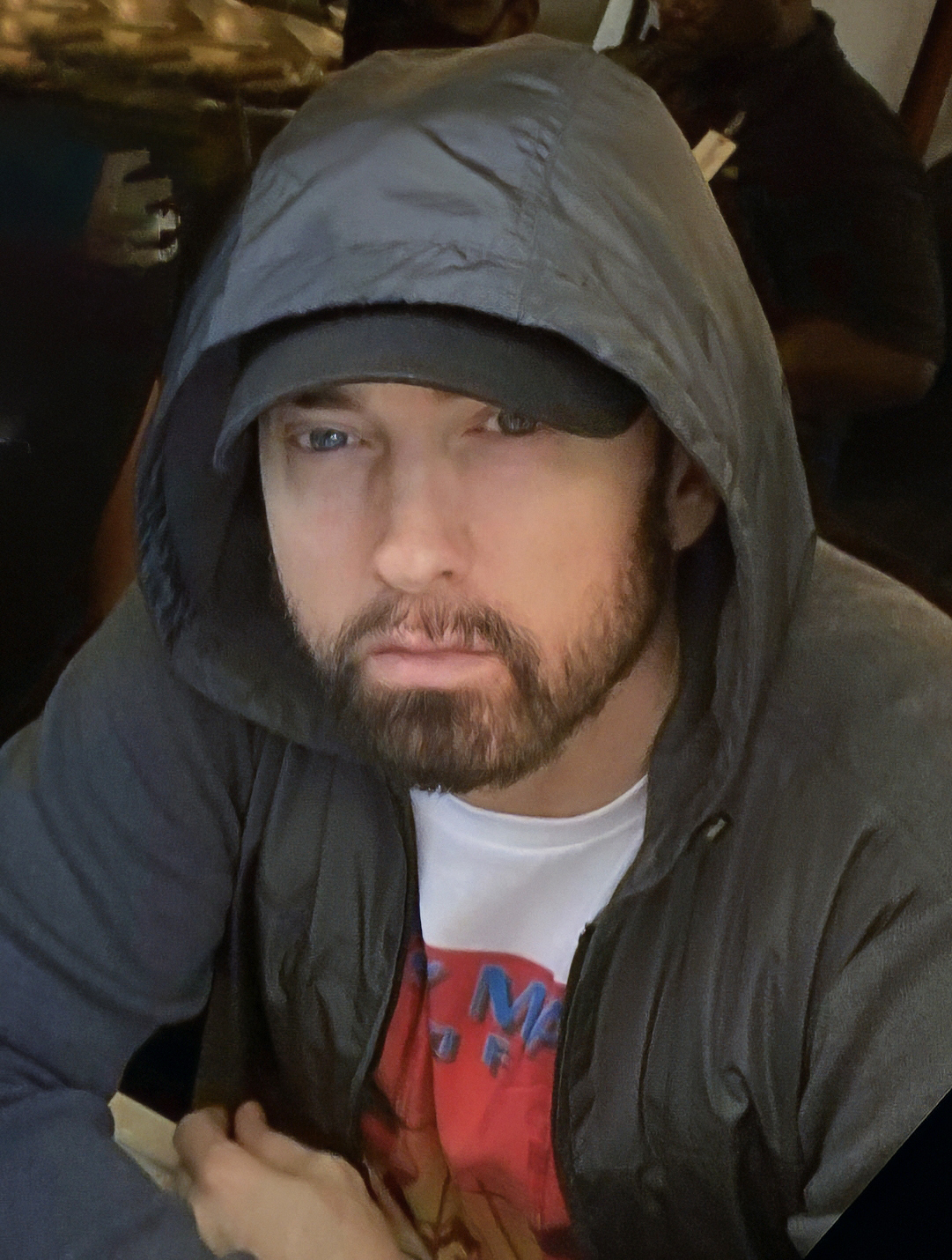
Eminem and Kid Rock have maintained a personal relationship for years, in which they each appeared in the other's projects at one point.

Kid Rock and Eminem are music artists who originated from Detroit. They reportedly met in 1990 at a local record store, when Eminem challenged Kid Rock to a rap battle. The latter rejected the challenge but offered rapping advice to Eminem. Kid Rock visited Eminem's local release party for the latter's EP Slim Shady EP (1997), and first collaborated on the song "Fuck Off" from the former's breakthrough studio album Devil Without a Cause (1998).

In an interview with Detroit Metro News in 2009, Eminem revealed that he and Kid Rock "are pretty good friends" and have a stable relationship. Kid Rock later made a cameo in the music video for Eminem's song "Berzerk" (2013). While the former became a prominent supporter of Donald Trump during his presidencies, Eminem instead became a vocal critic of Trump and showed support for Joe Biden and Kamala Harris in their presidential campaigns. In 2024, Kid Rock stated in a social media post that he did not agree with Eminem's political views but respected him for sharing his beliefs. The latter responded to the video with a tweet on X, stating that the "one thing" he agrees with Kid Rock is their support for the Detroit Lions.

=== 2026 ===
On October 1, 2026, Kid Rock announced his thirteenth studio album Halfway 2 Jesus, additionally stating that it would be a Christian album and that it was set for release on October 17. His website was also rebranded with merchandise featuring religious imagery. Eminem was announced to be featured on a track titled "7 Sins". On the same day, Kid Rock issued a statement that he was "proud of the guests who joined" him, of whom he named Eminem, writing that his verse reflects on "something we've talked about and that really needs to be heard".

The announcement of Eminem's collaboration with Kid Rock received a surprised reaction and criticism from the former's fanbase, noting the two's political differences and questioning the legitimacy of his guest appearance. However, some supported the collaboration for putting aside political topics and "agreeing to disagree" without "hatred."

On October 14, it was announced that Eminem's appearance was replaced by Lil Wayne on "7 Sins", and that he was instead featured on "Heal My Faith", another track from Halfway 2 Jesus. On October 17, the album was released with "Heal My Faith" being its fifth track. Upon its release, Eminem defended Kid Rock, stating that he was "choosing to make music with my old friend. Praying for all of us."

== Production and recording ==
"Heal My Faith" was produced by Kid Rock and Eminem, with the former providing bass, drums, electric guitar, and turntables on the song. Additional writing credits come from Aaron Zuckerman and Willie Morrison, with the former providing piano for the song. It was mixed by Kid Rock and Malay Ho, and recorded by Tony Campana and Gavin Mellberg, with Mike Strange Jr. doing both. "Heal My Faith" previously went under the titles "Lord Above" and "Show Me Love".

In 2025, Eminem recorded his verses for "Heal My Faith" and "7 Sins" at Effigy Studio in Detroit. For the former song, Kid Rock reached out to Eminem, "hoping for a quick writing asset." Much to Kid Rock's surprise, Eminem quickly sent him back his recorded verse. While working on Halfway 2 Jesus, Kid Rock initially chose to exclude "Heal My Faith" for "7 Sins" to avoid the appearance of two collaborations.

In early October 2026, Eminem reached out to Kid Rock and asked him about using "Heal My Faith" instead, also noticing that the album would release on his 54th birthday. Faced with a creative challenge, Kid Rock considered recording his own rap verse on "7 Sins", but hesitated after comparing his own skill to Eminem's and bringing in Lil Wayne to replace him. On October 12, staff of the Detroit Free Press visited Kid Rock's Nashville studio, where "Heal My Faith" went through "audio remixes and texts from Eminem's team about last-minute tweaks" ahead of a two-day deadline.

== Music and lyrics ==
"Heal My Faith" is a Christian rock, gospel, and hip-hop song. In a running time of four minutes and nineteen seconds, the song is built on metal guitar "flourishes" and church bells with Kid Rock "roaring over epic production." He raps on his own verse but with a "slower, more basic '80s rhyme scheme and delivery" compared to Eminem's technical approach.

Eminem's verse reflects on his friendship with Kid Rock, where they lived together at the Oakwood Apartments, how the latter was present at his Slim Shady EP release party and told him to "keep going". Later on, Eminem considers Kid Rock as his brother rather than his "political enemy", and reinforces his Christian beliefs with the lyric "Liberal and evangelical can agree / It's God first, home of the free."

== Reception ==
"Heal My Faith" received a mixed-to-negative perception from music critics. It was heavily criticized by Eminem's fans for his verse and use of voice alteration, and decision to collaborate with Kid Rock. Aron A. and Gabriel Bras Nevares of HotNewHipHop considered the song to be "musically grueling" and a "betrayal" of what Eminem has "stood for over the past decade." Nevares concluded by stating that "Heal My Faith" marks an "unnecessary" and "shallow turn" that reduces interest for Eminem's music in the future.

Matt Mitchell of Paste considered the song to be "the worst offense" on the album, which he considered to be "ill-fated" and containing "amateur-level stink that has plagued all his solo albums since The Marshall Mathers LP 2." Another Paste writer, Grace Robins-Somerville, questioned the intent of "Heal My Faith" by referencing Kid Rock's past controversies. She mockingly labeled it as "heartwarming" that he and Eminem could "put aside their differences for the sake of making a shit ton of money off the Christian music industry".

Quincy of Ratings Game Music reviewed the song in a decent light, considering "Heal My Faith" to be one of Eminem's "more subdued performances" with an easier delivery. He gave the song three out of five stars. Complex writer Dimas Sanfiorenzo saw "Heal My Faith" as an "interesting clash of styles" while complimenting Eminem's verse. Commercially, the song peaked at number 38 on the US Hot Christian Songs chart.

== Personnel ==
Credits are adapted from Tidal.

- Robert Ritchie – vocals, writing, co-production, bass, drums, electric guitar, turntables, mixing
- Marshall Mathers – featured artist, vocals, writing, co-production
- Aaron Zuckerman – writing, piano, recording
- Willie Morrison – writing
- Dan Frizsell – mixing
- Malay Ho – mixing
- Mike Strange Jr. – mixing, recording
- Tony Campana – recording
- Gavin Mellberg – recording

== Charts ==
Weekly chart performance for "Heal My Faith"
| Chart (2026) | Peak position |
|---|---|
| US Hot Christian Songs (Billboard) | 38 |
