= Halfway 2 Jesus =

Studio album by Kid Rock
- Released: October 17, 2026
- Genre: Christian rock
- Length: 71:05
- Label: Top Dog
- Producer: Kid Rock (Note: Eminem credited as co-producer on "Heal My Faith")

Kid Rock chronology
Bad Reputation (2022)	Halfway 2 Jesus (2026)

Singles from Halfway 2 Jesus
- 1. "'Til You Can't" Released: February 9, 2026; 2. "James 1:17 (Jesus Is King)" Released: October 1, 2026

Halfway 2 Jesus is the thirteenth studio album by American musician Kid Rock. It was released on October 17, 2026, through his own Top Dog Records. The album is a departure from Kid Rock's previous work, consisting primarily of Christian music. Guests appearing on the record include rappers Eminem and Lil Wayne as well as country musician Jimmie Allen. Some aspects of the album, namely its choir and orchestral arrangements, were generated through artificial intelligence.

Halfway 2 Jesus was preceded by the singles "'Til You Can't" and "James 1:17 (Jesus Is King)", with the former topping the Billboard Hot Christian Songs chart. The album received negative reviews from critics, and also generated controversy due to the participation of Allen, who was sued in 2022 for sexual assault. It failed to chart on the Billboard 200.

== Reception ==
Professional ratings
Review scores
Source	Rating
Paste	F
So It Goes	1/5 stars
Vice	2/10

Halfway 2 Jesus was disparaged by critics. Matt Mitchell of Paste gave the album a score of F, deeming it an "assault on the ears"; further, he considered its material to be a "mockery of gospel music" as well as a "farce" and a "grift" rather than a sincere artistic statement. In his So It Goes newsletter, Stephen Thomas Erlewine awarded the album one star out of five, describing Kid Rock's new direction as "throw[ing] some gospel choir harmonies atop his Skynyrd-Seger sludge" and summarizing his vocals as "singing about liquor and drugs with the wistfulness of an addict daydreaming about his next relapse". Vice writer Pete Megaseth gave the album a 2 out of 10 rating, finding it to be "completely lacking in any sense of a higher power". Both Erlewine and Jonathan Bernstein of Rolling Stone noted the presence of Allen on the album despite a 2022 lawsuit alleging sexual assault against the musician.

The album was also a commercial failure, missing the Billboard 200 album chart. Both the record and its singles did see some success on genre-specific charts, with the album reaching number 10 on the Top Christian Albums chart and its two singles, "'Til You Can't" and "James 1:17 (Jesus Is King)", reaching numbers one and 26 respectively on the Hot Christian Songs chart; the former also reached number 69 on the Hot 100.

== Track listing ==
Halfway 2 Jesus track listing
No.	Title	Writer(s)	Length
1.	"Freedom"	Robert Ritchie	0:50
2.	"James 1:17 (Jesus Is King)"	Ritchie	4:11
3.	"7 Sins" (feat. Lil Wayne)	Ritchie; John Eddie	3:55
4.	"Why Don't You Look Into Jesus"	Larry Norman	4:18
5.	"Heal My Faith" (featuring Eminem)	Ritchie; Aaron Zuckerman; Willie Morrison; Marshall Mathers	4:18
6.	"Water into Wine"	Eddie; Dean James Bailey	4:14
7.	"Halfway 2 Jesus" (featuring Gary LeVox and Jimmie Allen)	Ritchie; James Scheffer; Brian Carper; Levon Gray; Sal Gonzalez	4:44
8.	"I Don't Drink the Whiskey Anymore"	Scheffer; Carper; Chad Bearden	4:55
9.	"Me and Jesus"	Tom T. Hall	4:16
10.	"God Is Good"	Ritchie	6:19
11.	"Into the Setting Sun"	James Trombly	5:00
12.	"Broken Hearted People"	Ritchie; Matthew Shafer	3:53
13.	"'Til You Can't"	Ritchie; Matt Rogers; Ben Stennis	5:09
14.	"Why Don't You Look into Jesus" (RIRI mix)	Norman	3:42
15.	"High Road"	Ritchie; Eddie	4:56
16.	"Procession"	Ritchie	3:09
17.	"God Bless the USA"	Lee Greenwood	3:16
Total length:			71:05

== Personnel ==
Credits are adapted from Tidal.

- Kid Rock – production (all tracks), instrumentation (tracks 1, 16), vocals (2–15, 17), additional engineering (2), electric guitar (5, 7, 10, 12), drums (5, 10); bass, keyboards (5, 12); turntable, mixing (5); acoustic guitar (10, 13, 17)
- Dan Frizsell – mixing (1, 3–16), engineering (2–4, 6, 8–16), bass (8, 10)
- Herschel Boone – background vocals (2–4, 6, 7, 9, 11–15, 17)
- Gavin Mellberg – engineering assistance (2–4, 6, 8–16), engineering (5, 7)
- Tom Bukovac – electric guitar (2–4, 6, 9, 11, 14), acoustic guitar (4, 6, 14), keyboards (11)
- Malay Ho – mixing (2, 3, 5, 13)
- Jim "Moose" Brown – keyboards (2, 4, 6, 7, 9, 11, 14), acoustic guitar (7)
- Amanda Gene Rowland – background vocals (2, 4, 6, 9, 11–15, 17)
- Shannon Curfman – background vocals (2, 4, 6, 9, 11, 12, 14, 15)
- Steven Pierce – bass (2, 4, 6, 9, 11, 14)
- Rowan Stewart – drums (2, 4, 6, 9, 11, 14)
- J. D. Simo – electric guitar (2, 4, 6, 9, 11, 14)
- Gary LeVox – background vocals (3), vocals (7)
- Marlon Young – electric guitar (3), acoustic guitar (12)
- Kat Perkins – background vocals (3)
- Jacob Lowery – bass (3)
- Jordan Perlson – drums (3)
- Eminem – vocals, co-production (5)
- Mike Strange Jr. – mixing, engineering (5)
- Aaron Zuckerman – piano, engineering (5)
- Tony Campana – engineering (5)
- Tim Watson – fiddle (6, 7, 9, 13, 17)
- Jim Jonsin – bass, drums (7)
- Jeff "Skunk" Baxter – electric guitar (7)
- Jimmie Allen – vocals (7)
- David Bryan – keyboards (10)
- Evan Hutchings – drums (12, 15)
- Aaron Julison – bass (13)
- Stefanie Eulinberg – drums (13)
- "Cowboy" Eddie Long – guitar (13)
- Dean James – keyboards (13)
- Perry Coleman – background vocals (15)
- James Mitchell – acoustic guitar, electric guitar (15)
- Gordon Mote – keyboards (15)
- Terena Boone – background vocals (17)

== Charts ==
Chart performance for Halfway 2 Jesus
Chart (2026)	Peak position
US Top Christian Albums (Billboard)	10
