= Aaron Zuckerman =

American producer and songwriter

- Genres: Rock; Hip hop; Pop; Country; Rap; Alternative hip hop; Indie
- Occupations: Record producer, songwriter
- Label: Reservoir Media

Aaron Zuckerman is an American producer and songwriter. He has produced and written songs for artists such as Liam Payne, Machine Gun Kelly (MGK), Bbno$, DNCE, Lil Wayne, Bebe Rexha, Wiz Khalifa, Willie Jones, Rico Nasty, and Cheat Codes.

== Career ==
Zuckerman began his career in Los Angeles. A platinum-selling producer, Zuckerman has worked with a wide range of artists, including Liam Payne, LANY, Machine Gun Kelly (MGK), Hunter Hayes, Travis Barker, Bbno$, DNCE, Walk The Moon, Quinn XCII, Leah Kate, Wiz Khalifa, Willie Jones, Rico Nasty, and Cheat Codes, among others. His songwriting work includes "Devil Doesn’t Bargain" by Alec Benjamin, which achieved gold record certification in the United States. Billboard credits Zuckerman as the mind behind songs like Lil Wayne's "Dreams", "2 Souls On Fire" by Bebe Rexha featuring Quavo, and "White Claw" by Yung Gravy and Shania Twain.

In July 2024, Zuckerman signed with music company Reservoir Media.

== Discography ==
Title	Year	Artist (s)	Album
"Unsweet"	2016	DNCE	DNCE
"The Fall"	2016	Bryce Vine	Non-album single
"Glamorama"	2016	Bryce Vine	Night Circus
"playboy shit"	2017	Blackbear, Lil Aaron	cybersex
"Streets of Gold"	2017	Isaiah Firebrace	Non-album single
"Something Dangerous"	2017	Hoodie Allen	The Hype
"Don't Let Me Know"	2017	Cyrus Villanueva	Non-album single
"Black"	2017	Eric Nally	Non-album single
"2 Souls On Fire"	2018	Bebe Rexha, Quavo	Expectations
"Taking Me Back"	2018	LANY	Malibu Nights
"Let Me Down Slowly"	2018	Alec Benjamin	Narrated for You
"Middle Finger"	2018	Phoebe Ryan, Quinn XCII	Non-album single
"Phantom"	2018	Nightly	Non-album single
"Headstone"	2018	Lit	These Are The Days
"Rock$tar Famou$"	2018	Lil Aaron, Rico Nasty	Rock$tar Famou$
"Classic and Perfect"	2019	Bryce Vine	Carnival
"Love Me Hate Me"	2019	Bryce Vine	Carnival
"Factory Love"	2019	Bryce Vine	Carnival
"Weekend"	2019	Liam Payne	LP1
"Brain"	2019	Drax Project	Drax Project
"Mistakes"	2020	Jonas Blue	EST. 1999
"Stay Away"	2020	Mod Sun, Machine Gun Kelly, Goody Grace	Non-album single
"Dreams"	2020	Lil Wayne	Funeral
"Life Goes On"	2020	Bryce Vine	Non-album single
"Kinda Like It Now"	2020	Mod Sun	Non-album single
"It Falls Apart"	2020	Bryce Vine	Problems
"Henny"	2020	Phoebe Ryan	How It Used to Feel
"Call Me Stupid"	2021	Brynn Elliott	Can I Be Real?
"Stay"	2021	Cheat Codes, Bryce Vine	HELLRAISERS, Part 1
"Win Anyway"	2021	WALK THE MOON	Non-album single
"Down"	2021	Mod Sun, Travis Barker	Non-album single
"Blame It On Me"	2021	Bryce Vine	Non-album single
"Care At All"	2021	Bryce Vine	Non-album single
"Day & Night"	2021	TCTS	Non-album single
"American Dream"	2022	Bryce Vine	Non-album single
"Nuance"	2022	Alec Benjamin	(Un)Commentary
"Devil Doesn't Bargain"	2022	Alec Benjamin	(Un)Commentary
"Speakers"	2022	Alec Benjamin	(Un)Commentary
"The Way You Felt"	2022	Alec Benjamin	(Un)Commentary
"Butterflies"	2022	RØNIN	Non-album single
"Goodness Gracious"	2023	Baby Gravy, Yung Gravy, bbno$	Baby Gravy 3
"Lil Vibe"	2023	Willie Jones	Something To Dance To
"Sober"	2023	Hunter Hayes	Red Sky
"Gold Rush"	2023	Bryce Vine	Non-album single
"Atmosphere"	2023	Drax Project	Upside
"What Did I Do?"	2023	Hayd	Sad Songs 2023
"I Went to Jail in Georgia"	2024	Yung Gravy	Serving Country
"White Claw"	2024	Yung Gravy, Shania Twain	Serving Country
"Cop A Truck"	2024	Yung Gravy, Brantley Gilbert	Serving Country
"Whoa Nelly"	2024	Yung Gravy, Juicy J	Serving Country
"Soundcloud Cowboy"	2024	Yung Gravy	Serving Country
"IT'S ALL GOOD"	2024	Niko Moon, Michael Franti & Spearhead	THESE ARE THE DAYS
"try for you"	2024	lovelytheband	lovelytheband
"Write One"	2024	Karley Scott Collins, Keith Urban	Write One
