= Sweet Action =

EP by Jack Harlow
- Released: March 13, 2020
- Genre: Hip-hop
- Length: 16:40
- Labels: Generation Now; Atlantic
- Producers: Jetsonmade; LosTheProducer; Pooh Beatz; Jenius; Saint Mino; 2forwoyne; Kvyren; Paul Blanco; Kill

Jack Harlow chronology
| Confetti (2019) | Sweet Action (2020) | Thats What They All Say (2020) |

Singles from Sweet Action
- 1. "Whats Poppin" Released: January 21, 2020

Sweet Action is the second extended play (EP) by American rapper Jack Harlow. It was released by Generation Now and Atlantic Records on March 13, 2020, Harlow's 22nd birthday.

== Background ==
Harlow announced the EP on Twitter on March 9, 2020, saying, "Sweet Action. My new project. Out on my birthday...this Friday the 13th. Y'all ready?"

== Critical reception ==
Professional ratings
Review scores
| Source | Rating |
|---|---|
| AllMusic | 2.5/5 stars |
| Earmilk | 7.5/10 |
| RapReviews | 7/10 |

Gregory Castel of Earmilk said, "In all seven songs, the birthday boy sort of gives classic hip hop braggadocio." Steve 'Flash' Juon of RapReviews said, "Sweet Action suggest Harlow is one rapper to keep an eye on."

== Track listing ==
Sweet Action track listing
| No. | Title | Writer(s) | Producer(s) | Length |
|---|---|---|---|---|
| 1. | "Whats Poppin" | Jack Harlow; Carlos Goodwin; Darryl Clemons; John Lucas; Nathan Ward II; Tahj Morgan | Jetsonmade; LosTheProducer; Pooh Beatz | 2:20 |
| 2. | "2stylish" | Harlow; Julius Brown; Mino Drerup; Ward II | Jenius; Saint Mino | 2:23 |
| 3. | "I Wanna See Some Ass" (featuring Jetsonmade) | Harlow; Kevin Gomringer; Morgan; Tim Gomringer | JetsonMade | 2:05 |
| 4. | "Smells Like Incense" | Harlow; 2forwoyne; Kvyren | 2forwoyne; Kvyren | 2:24 |
| 5. | "Out Front" | Harlow; Brown; Drerup; Ward II | Jenius; Saint Mino | 2:59 |
| 6. | "Hey Big Head" | Harlow; Brown; Ward II; Shin Hwang | Jenius; Paul Blanco | 2:02 |
| 7. | "Once May Comes" | Harlow; Dawoyne Lawson; Brown; Kill; Ward II | 2forwoyne; Jenius; Kill | 2:27 |
| Total length: | | | | 16:40 |

== Charts ==
Chart performance for Sweet Action
| Chart (2020) | Peak position |
|---|---|
| Canadian Albums (Billboard) | 15 |
| US Billboard 200 | 20 |
| US Top R&B/Hip-Hop Albums (Billboard) | 14 |

== Certifications ==
Certifications for Sweet Action
| Region | Certification | Certified units/sales |
|---|---|---|
| Canada (Music Canada) | Gold | 40,000^{‡} |
^{‡} Sales+streaming figures based on certification alone.
