= Thats What They All Say =

2020 studio album by Jack Harlow

Studio album by Jack Harlow
- Released: December 11, 2020
- Genre: Hip-hop
- Length: 42:31
- Labels: Generation Now; Atlantic
- Producers: 1st Class; Ayo the Producer; Boi-1da; Bryvn; Buddafly Wolf; Carlos Homs; Cubeatz; DJ Dahi; Foreign Teck; Go Grizzly; Harry Fraud; Heavy Mellow; Hit-Boy; Jahaan Sweet; Jasper Harris; Jenius; jetsonmade; J.Lbs; Joseph Hodges, Jr.; LosTheProducer; Mantiz; Nami; Neeko Baby; Neenyo; Paul Blanco; Pooh Beatz; Scott Storch; Sonny Digital; the Trak Starz; Wallis Lane

Jack Harlow chronology
Sweet Action (2020)	Thats What They All Say (2020)	Come Home the Kids Miss You (2022)

Singles from Thats What They All Say
- 1. "Whats Poppin" Released: January 21, 2020; 2. "Tyler Herro" Released: October 22, 2020; 3. "Way Out" Released: December 9, 2020; 4. "Already Best Friends" Released: March 30, 2021

Thats What They All Say is the debut studio album by American rapper Jack Harlow. It was released on December 11, 2020, by Generation Now and Atlantic Records. The album features guest appearances from Lil Baby, Big Sean, Chris Brown, Adam Levine, EST Gee, Bryson Tiller, DaBaby, Tory Lanez and Lil Wayne, the latter three appear on the remix of Harlow's breakout single, "Whats Poppin". It also features a posthumous guest appearance from Static Major. At the "63rd Annual Grammy Awards", "Whats Poppin" was nominated for the "Grammy Award for Best Rap Performance".

== Background ==
In an interview with iHeartRadio, Harlow shared the story behind the album title:

You know, I've heard it all before. It's taken long enough for me to get to this point that I've developed some thick skin. And so it's really given me a chance to just let everything kinda fly off my shoulder and it doesn't bother me as much. I know who I am. So Thats What They All Say is a response. I've heard it all before. There's nothing you can tell me.

== Music and lyrics ==
The album is a "collection of laid-back anthems". On the album, Harlow "pays homages to his Louisville roots while still affirming that his eyes are set on goals far beyond where he started." "Rendezvous" and "Face of My City" feature southern trap production while "Luv Is Dro" is R&B.

== Critical reception ==
Professional ratings
Review scores
Source	Rating
AllMusic	3.5/5 stars
The Guardian	3/5 stars
Ratings Game Music	B
Rolling Stone	3.5/5 stars
Vinyl Chapters	4.5/5

Quincy of Ratings Game Music wrote that Harlow "impresses with big-boy punchlines, impressive flows, sly-ass lyrics, and sneaky good melodies." On the other hand, he pointed out that "Jack could’ve covered a broader range of topics on the album."

Danny Schwartz of Rolling Stone wrote that Harlow "put Louisville rap on the national radar for the first time in a generation, and his music is strongest when he keeps it close to home." Meanwhile, he noted that his music is similar to that of Drake.

Kate Hutchinson of The Guardian wrote that "his most interesting songs are the more introspective ones, where he addresses being uncomfortable about his acclaim (Keep It Light) and his white privilege (Baxter Avenue)" and "these songs hint that there might be more to come from Harlow than everything you’ve already heard before."

Imogen Lawlor of Vinyl Chapters wrote that the album "shows incredible maturity, depth and understanding of his interactions with others", which is achieved through "playful production, immense musicality and blunt lyricism intelligently manipulated to profoundly articulate ambivalent sentiments about relationships and life more generally."

== Commercial performance ==
Thats What They All Say debuted at number five on the US Billboard 200, with 51,000 album-equivalent units (2,000 including pure album sales) in its first week. The album also accumulated a total of 66.21 million on-demand streams of the album's songs during the tracking week.

== Track listing ==
Thats What They All Say track listing
No.	Title	Writer(s)	Producer(s)	Length
1.	"Rendezvous"	Jackman Harlow; Chauncey Hollis; George Patterson	Hit-Boy	1:53
2.	"Face of My City" (featuring Lil Baby)	Harlow; Dominique Jones; Sonny Uwaezuoke; Tim Gomringer; Kevin Gomringer	Sonny Digital; Cubeatz	2:03
3.	"21C / Delta"	Harlow; Julius-Alexander Brown; Paimon Jahanbin; Nima Jahanbin; Bryan Yepes	Jenius; Wallis Lane; Bryvn	3:34
4.	"Funny Seeing You Here"	Harlow; Dacoury Natche	DJ Dahi	2:34
5.	"Way Out" (featuring Big Sean)	Harlow; Sean Anderson; Tahj Morgan; Jasper Harris; Everett Romano	jetsonmade; Harris; Heavy Mellow	2:48
6.	"Already Best Friends" (featuring Chris Brown)	Harlow; Christopher Brown; Morgan; Yusuf Ali II; Christopher Bivins; Joseph Hodges, Jr.	jetsonmade; Ye Ali; Buddafly Wolf; Hodges	3:17
7.	"Keep It Light"	Harlow; Rory Quigley; Nicholas Smith	Harry Fraud	3:23
8.	"Creme"	Harlow; Brown; Paul Blanco; Nathan Ward II	Jenius; Blanco	2:36
9.	"Same Guy" (featuring Adam Levine)	Harlow; Adam Levine; Braden Watt; Morgan; Ward	Watt; jetsonmade^{[c]}; Nemo Achida^{[c]}; Carlos Homs^{[a]}	2:44
10.	"Route 66" (featuring EST Gee)	Harlow; George Stone III; Morgan; Michael Hernandez; Dondre Moore; Khaleel Griffin	jetsonmade; Foreign Teck; Neeko Baby; 1st Class	2:33
11.	"Tyler Herro"	Harlow; Matthew Samuels; Scott Storch; Sean Seaton; Jahaan Sweet	Boi-1da; Storch; Neenyo; Sweet	2:36
12.	"Luv Is Dro" (featuring Static Major and Bryson Tiller)	Harlow; Stephen Garrett; Bryson Tiller; Kevin Price; Alonzo Lee, Jr.; Shamar Daugherty; Ward	Go Grizzly; the Trak Starz; Nemo Achida	2:57
13.	"Whats Poppin"	Harlow; Morgan; Darryl Clemons; Carlos Goodwin, Jr.; John Lucas; Ward	jetsonmade; Pooh Beatz; LosTheProducer	2:19
14.	"Baxter Avenue"	Harlow; Austin Owens; James Foye III; Rodney Jones, Jr.; Sonny Moore	Ayo the Producer; Keyz; Lil Rod; Skrillex^{[a]}	3:27
15.	"Whats Poppin" (remix featuring DaBaby, Tory Lanez, and Lil Wayne)	Harlow; Jonathan Kirk; Daystar Peterson; Dwayne Carter, Jr.; Morgan; Clemons; Goodwin; Lucas; Ward	jetsonmade; Pooh Beatz; LosTheProducer	3:47
Total length:				42:31

Notes

- ^{^[c]} signifies a co-producer
- ^{^[a]} signifies an additional producer
- "21C / Delta" features additional vocals by Millie Go Lightly, and background vocals by Alexandria Dopson
- "Funny Seeing You Here" features additional vocals by Tess Henley
- "Keep It Light" features spoken word by Maggie Harlow, Jack's mother
- "Same Guy" features additional vocals by Jason Clayborn and The Atmosphere Changers

Sample credits

- "Rendezvous" contains samples from "Lost for Words", written by George Patterson, as performed by Midnight Movers.
- "Keep It Light" contains samples from "Dirt and Grime", written by Nicholas Smith, as performed by Father's Children.
- "Luv Is Dro" contains samples from "Love Is Dro", written by Stephen Garrett, Alonzo Lee, Jr., and Shamar Daugherty, as performed by Static Major.
- "Baxter Avenue" contains samples from “Glass Hearted”, written by Dylan Teixeira, as performed by Nami.

== Charts ==
=== Weekly charts ===
Weekly chart performance for Thats What They All Say
Chart (2020–2022)	Peak position
Australian Albums (ARIA)	36
Belgian Albums (Ultratop Flanders)	136
Canadian Albums (Billboard)	7
Dutch Albums (Album Top 100)	38
Finnish Albums (Suomen virallinen lista)	3
Irish Albums (Official Charts)	48
New Zealand Albums (RMNZ)	18
Norwegian Albums (VG-lista)	38
UK Albums (Official Charts)	73
US Billboard 200	5
US Top R&B/Hip-Hop Albums (Billboard)	2

=== Year-end charts ===
2021 year-end chart performance for Thats What They All Say
Chart (2021)	Position
Australian Albums (ARIA)	93
Canadian Albums (Billboard)	37
New Zealand Albums (RMNZ)	35
US Billboard 200	51
US Top R&B/Hip-Hop Albums (Billboard)	24

2022 year-end chart performance for Thats What They All Say
Chart (2022)	Position
New Zealand Albums (RMNZ)	35
US Billboard 200	131
US Top R&B/Hip-Hop Albums (Billboard)	77

== Certifications ==
Certifications for Thats What They All Say
Region	Certification	Certified units/sales
Canada (Music Canada)	2× Platinum	160,000^{‡}
Denmark (IFPI Danmark)	Gold	10,000^{‡}
New Zealand (RMNZ)	Gold	7,500^{‡}
United Kingdom (BPI)	Silver	60,000^{‡}
United States (RIAA)	2× Platinum	2,000,000^{‡}
^{‡} Sales+streaming figures based on certification alone.
