= Way Out (Jack Harlow song) =

2020 single by Jack Harlow featuring Big Sean

Single by Jack Harlow featuring Big Sean

from the album Thats What They All Say
- Released: December 9, 2020
- Genre: Hip hop
- Length: 2:49
- Label: Generation Now; Atlantic
- Songwriters: Jackman Harlow; Sean Anderson; Tahj Morgan; Jasper Harris; Everett Romano
- Producers: JetsonMade; Harris; Heavy Mellow

Jack Harlow singles chronology
"Tyler Herro" (2020)	"Way Out" (2020)	"Hot Boy Bling" (2021)

Big Sean singles chronology
"4 Thangs" (2020)	"Way Out" (2020)	"Deep Reverence" (2022)

"Way Out" is a song by American rapper Jack Harlow, featuring vocals from fellow American rapper Big Sean. It was released through Generation Now and Atlantic Records, as the second single from the former's debut studio album, Thats What They All Say, two days before the album, on December 9, 2020. The song's production was handled by JetsonMade, Jasper Harris and Heavy Mellow.

== Credits and personnel ==
Credits adapted from Tidal.

- Jackman Harlow – vocals, songwriting, composition
- Sean Anderson – vocals, featured artist, songwriting, composition
- Tahj Morgan – songwriting, composition, production
- Mason Hall – songwriting, composition, production
- Jasper Harris – songwriting, composition, production
- Nickie Pabón – recording, mixing
- Leslie Brathwaite – mixing
- Colin Leonard – mastering

== Charts ==
Chart performance of "Way Out"
Chart (2020–2021)	Peak position
Belgium (Ultratip Bubbling Under Flanders)	43
Canada (Canadian Hot 100)	51
Global 200 (Billboard)	81
Greece International (IFPI)	86
Ireland (IRMA)	77
New Zealand Hot Singles (RMNZ)	8
Portugal (AFP)	178
US Billboard Hot 100	74
US Hot R&B/Hip-Hop Songs (Billboard)	18
US Rolling Stone Top 100	52

== Certifications ==
Region	Certification	Certified units/sales
New Zealand (RMNZ)	Gold	15,000^{‡}
United States (RIAA)	Platinum	1,000,000^{‡}
^{‡} Sales+streaming figures based on certification alone.
