= Already Best Friends =

2020 single by Jack Harlow featuring Chris Brown

Single by Jack Harlow featuring Chris Brown

from the album Thats What They All Say
- Released: March 30, 2021
- Genre: R&B; hip hop
- Length: 3:17
- Label: Generation Now; Warner; Atlantic
- Songwriters: Jackman Harlow; Christopher Maurice Brown
- Producers: JetsonMade; Ye Ali; Joe Hodges; Rance

Jack Harlow singles chronology
"Hot Boy Bling" (2021)	"Already Best Friends" (2021)	"Body (Remix)" (2021)

Chris Brown singles chronology
"Baby" (2021)	"Already Best Friends" (2021)	"Come Through" (2021)

Music video
- "Already Best Friends" on YouTube

"Already Best Friends" is a song written and performed by American rapper Jack Harlow featuring American singer Chris Brown. It was originally released on December 11, 2020 through Warner, Generation Now, and Atlantic Records, as a track from the former's debut studio album, Thats What They All Say, before being released as the third and final single on March 30, 2021.

== Background and composition ==
"Already Best Friends" initially was supposed to feature singer Tinashe, but her verse on the song was eventually replaced with Chris Brown's.

The song is a hip hop-infused R&B mid-tempo. In "Already Best Friends" Harlow and Brown sing about how they cross paths with two newly formed best friends, which leads to a ménage à trois situation: "Two at a time, laying in my bed / One on top and the other give me head / Girl on girl I love the taste", Brown sings in a "smooth way", as described by Jade Boren of The Guardian. In the last verse Harlow asks the fictional best friends where their "mans" are, going on to rap, "She said 'What's that?' and they smiled at each other and they both laughed / I don't need a man, she my other half / We got something not a lot of others have / And I feel like I knew her from the past".

== Music video ==
The music video for the song was shot in Tulum, Mexico, and published the day of release for the single. In the video, Brown shows off his moves as they walk through a packed party in the jungle.

== Charts ==
Chart performance for "Already Best Friends"
Chart (2021)	Peak position
New Zealand Hot Singles (RMNZ)	16
US Bubbling Under Hot 100 (Billboard)	19
US R&B/Hip-Hop Airplay (Billboard)	23
US Rhythmic Airplay (Billboard)	13

== Certifications ==
Certifications for "Already Best Friends"
Region	Certification	Certified units/sales
Canada (Music Canada)	Platinum	80,000^{‡}
New Zealand (RMNZ)	Platinum	30,000^{‡}
United Kingdom (BPI)	Silver	200,000^{‡}
United States (RIAA)	Platinum	1,000,000^{‡}
^{‡} Sales+streaming figures based on certification alone.
