= Funeral (Lil Wayne album) =

Studio album by Lil Wayne
- Released: January 31, 2020
- Recorded: 2016–2019
- Genre: Hip-hop
- Length: 76:04
- Labels: Young Money; UMG
- Producers: Aaron Zuckerman; Alex Delicata; B Ham; Ben Billions; Benny Wond3r; Bijan Amir; Blue Cheeze; Bobby Keyz; Brandon Finessin; Charlie Handsome; Chill Shump; Cool & Dre; Dunk Rock; Kamo; Loctor Duke; LostKidSamy; Louis Haze; Jahlil Beats; Javar Rockamore; Mannie Fresh; Manny Galvez; Mike Will Made It; MonstaBeatz; Murda Beatz; Prxz; Rex Cudo; R!O; Ryan Ogren; Sarcastic Sounds; Sheldon Ferguson; Smash David; Smurv; Some Randoms; Spanish Josh; Stonii; Streetrunner; Swede; Tarik Azzouz; Timothy Sommers; Young Yonni

Lil Wayne chronology
Tha Carter V (2018)	Funeral (2020)	No Ceilings 3 (2020)

Singles from Funeral
- 1. "I Do It" Released: January 31, 2020

Singles from Funeral: Deluxe Edition
- 1. "Shimmy" Released: July 28, 2020

Funeral is the thirteenth studio album by American rapper Lil Wayne. It was released on January 31, 2020, by Young Money Entertainment and UMG Recordings. It features guest appearances from Big Sean, Lil Baby, Jay Rock, Adam Levine, 2 Chainz, Takeoff, The-Dream, Lil Twist, O.T. Genasis and the late XXXTentacion. On May 29, a deluxe edition of the album was released with guest appearances from Doja Cat, Tory Lanez, Lil Uzi Vert, Benny the Butcher, Conway the Machine, and Jessie Reyez.

Its lead single, "I Do It", featuring Big Sean and Lil Baby, was released concurrently with the album. "Shimmy", featuring Doja Cat, was sent to rhythmic contemporary radio on July 28, 2020, as the album's second single.

The album debuted at number one on the US Billboard 200, while charting moderately in other territories. It was relatively overlooked by professional review outlets, although several critics were somewhat positive in appraising the album.

== Recording and production ==
In 2016, while Lil Wayne was in the midst of the legal battle with Cash Money Records over contractual disputes, it was announced that his next album would be titled Funeral. The album was completed in 2019, as Wayne started promoting the album again. In an interview with Vibe, Lil Wayne spoke on how his recording process changed throughout his career, saying:

I love the difficulty of trying to fit in with what's going on today, making sure I sound likeable to the ears today and having to remind myself that it's not about what it was back then. […] I can't wait to get in the studio now every night, just to see what I can come up with. [Before] it was just me going to the studio and saying, let me kill ten more songs and then I'm going to go home or do whatever I was doing. Now, it's let me see what I come up with. Self-discovery, rebirth – call it whatever you want to call it but it feels awesome, I swear to God.

The track "Bing James" concludes with 24 seconds of silence, paying tribute to the death of Kobe Bryant. The album also contains 24 tracks on the standard edition and 8 tracks on the deluxe edition, honoring Kobe Bryant's jersey numbers with the Los Angeles Lakers.

== Marketing and sales ==
In an interview leading up to the album's release, Lil Wayne explained the title Funeral as a continuation of his album Rebirth in 2010, to follow-up on the series. The calligraphic text on the cover features a rotational ambigram. It reads Funeral right side up and Lil Wayne upside down. On January 23, 2020, Lil Wayne revealed the album's release date and artwork. With the announcement, he also teased a snippet of the album's title track.

Funeral debuted atop the US Billboard 200 for the week of February 15, 2020, recording 139,000 album-equivalent units, 38,000 of which were pure album sales. It is Lil Wayne's fifth US number-one album.

== Critical reception ==
Professional ratings
Aggregate scores
Source	Rating
AnyDecentMusic?	5.9/10
Metacritic	62/100
Review scores
Source	Rating
AllMusic	2.5/5 stars
And It Don't Stop	A−
Clash	6/10
Consequence of Sound	B−
Exclaim!	6/10
HipHopDX	2.9/5
NME	3/5 stars
The Observer	3/5 stars
Pitchfork	7.3/10
Rolling Stone	2.5/5 stars

Funeral was met with a mixed to positive response from critics. At Metacritic, which assigns a normalized rating out of 100 to reviews from professional publications, the album received an average score of 62, based on 10 reviews. Aggregator AnyDecentMusic? gave it 5.9 out of 10, based on their assessment of the critical consensus. According to Robert Christgau, the album was "downplayed by most of the few outlets that bothered to review it at all—five mostly kindish notices are nonetheless stuck down in Metacritic’s dread 50-60 zone, with only Rolling Stone's a takedown pan."

Reviewing in February 2020 for Consequence of Sound, Christopher Thiessen said that "Funeral plays less like an album and more like a mixtape" and wrote of Lil Wayne: "He still has endless punchlines to punctuate his effortless flow. He still has clear vision and awareness of his place in the hip-hop game. However, Wayne is not a great editor, and thus listening to Funeral can become exhausting about halfway through." Jacob Carey of Exclaim! also criticized the length of the album and concluded that, "overall, Funeral lacks replay value compared to the multiple 'best of the year' albums that Wayne has proven capable of creating." NME's Thomas Hobbs felt that the songs lack a unifying quality within the context of an album, while interpreting the large number of tracks as "an attempt to play into streaming politics". He added that, "it's a real shame that the ambitious druggy swirl of some of the earlier material is replaced with more formulaic songwriting". Danny Schwartz wrote in Rolling Stone: "Funeral is wildly uneven, a landscape of pronounced highs and lows. In truth, it peaks early, on 'Mahogany'." Schwartz called "Trust Nobody" the worst song on the album, labeling it a "sunk by a banal and out-of-place Adam Levine hook, while noting that "Get Out Of My Head" is "soured by the great rap pedant XXXTentacion" and called "Sights and Silencers" a "surprisingly limp The-Dream ballad that he should have just given to Jeremih". While applauding the parental neglect-themed "Bastard (Satan's Kid)", he ultimately found Funeral to be "emotionally adrift".

Other reviewers were more enthusiastic. In The Observer, Kitty Empire wrote that Lil Wayne's "flow can still be fearsome, even if his edit function remains iffy", and that songs such as "Clap for Em" are more than lively enough to render the album's title "nonsense". Pitchfork's Sheldon Pearce credited him for "experimenting with an array of styles and a dizzying maze of wordplay", while comparing his raps to thrilling romps: "Wayne raps with a lightning ferocity that will often conceal his more direct revelations." Similarly, RapReviews critic Ryan Feyre said that "Wayne, much like in his mixtape days, is finally having fun again. And when he does that, the results are captivating." In his "Consumer Guide" column, Christgau regarded the album as the rapper's best since No Ceilings (2009) and explained: "Cherishing no vested interest in hip-hop's musical progress, if any, I enjoy the shit out of it while admitting it's more a collection than an album, its parts more impressive than what they add up to. But it had me from the superb lead/title track: 'Welcome to the funeral/Closed casket as usual/Soul snatching, that’s usual/Amen, hallelujah though/Whole family delusional/Niggas cryin’ like two-year-olds.'"

== Track listing ==
Funeral track listing
No.	Title	Writer(s)	Producer(s)	Length
1.	"Funeral"	Dwayne Carter, Jr.; Mario Jefferson; Darius Ginn, Jr.; Jonathan Buice	R!O; Kamo	3:14
2.	"Mahogany"	Carter; Byron Thomas; Jeremy Fedryk; David Jackson; Eryn Kane	Mannie Fresh; Sarcastic Sounds	2:57
3.	"Mama Mia"	Carter; Daniel Klein; Matthew Campfield	Some Randoms	3:45
4.	"I Do It" (featuring Big Sean and Lil Baby)	Carter; Sean Anderson; Dominique Jones; Ryan Vojtesak; Masamune Kudo	Rex Kudo; Charlie Handsome	3:04
5.	"Dreams"	Carter; Alexander Delicata; Timothy Sommers; Aaron Zuckerman; Ben Burgess; Jeremy Dussolliet	Alex Delicata; Sommers; Aaron Zuckerman	3:47
6.	"Stop Playin with Me"	Carter; Marquan Shumpert-Reid; Jonathan Rivera; Marco Rodriguez	Chill Shump; Rivs On Da Beat^{[a]}; Infamous^{[b]}	3:07
7.	"Clap for Em"	Carter; Desmond Peterson; Ronald Ferebee, Jr.; Orlando Tucker; Derrick Milano; Orville Hall; Phillip Price; Kenneth Hurst, Jr.	Benny Wond3r; Young Yonni; Jahlil Beats	2:30
8.	"Bing James" (featuring Jay Rock)	Carter; Johnny McKinzie, Jr.; Bijan Amirkhani	Bijan Amir	3:23
9.	"Not Me"	Carter; Nicholas Warwar; Tarik Azzouz	Streetrunner; Azzouz; Amos Roddy^{[c]}	3:19
10.	"Trust Nobody" (featuring Adam Levine)	Carter; Adam Levine; Ryan Ogren; Brandon Hamlin; Benjamin Diehl; Jake Torrey; Michael Matosic; Jacob Hindlin	Ogren; Ben Billions; B Ham	2:48
11.	"Know You Know" (featuring 2 Chainz)	Carter; Tauheed Epps; Javar Rockamore; Theodore Thomas; Bobby Reese; Keith Martin; Daniel Groover	Rockamore; Stonii; Bobby Keyz; Fuse^{[c]}	2:44
12.	"Wild Dogs"	Carter; Daryl Harleaux; John Fitch	MonstaBeatz	3:36
13.	"Harden"	Carter; Warwar; Azzouz	Streetrunner; Azzouz	3:02
14.	"I Don't Sleep" (featuring Takeoff)	Carter; Kirshnik Ball; Rockamore; Theo. Thomas; Reese; Martin	Rockamore; Stonii; Bobby Keyz	3:20
15.	"Sights and Silencers" (featuring The-Dream)	Carter; Terius Nash; Michael Williams; Aaron Jackson	Mike Will Made It; Blue Cheeze	3:22
16.	"Ball Hard" (featuring Lil Twist)	Carter; Christopher Moore; Diehl	Ben Billions	2:58
17.	"Bastard (Satan's Kid)"	Carter; Marcello Valenzano; Andre Lyon; Joshua Leon	Cool & Dre; Spanish Josh	3:12
18.	"Get Outta My Head" (featuring XXXTentacion)	Carter; Jahseh Onfroy; Joshua Dale	Prxz; Natra Average^{[c]}	2:58
19.	"Piano Trap"	Carter; B. Thomas	Mannie Fresh	3:14
20.	"Line Em Up"	Carter; Shane Lindstrom	Murda Beatz	2:59
21.	"Darkside"	Carter; Hamlin; Vaidel Vidal	B Ham; Smurv	2:19
22.	"Never Mind"	Carter; Rockamore; Reese; Sheldon Ferguson; Kevin Yancey	Rockamore; Bobby Keyz; Ferguson	3:33
23.	"T.O." (featuring O.T. Genasis)	Carter; Odis Flores; Harleaux; Fitch	MonstaBeatz	3:08
24.	"Wayne's World"	Carter; Manny Galvez; Adolfo Ramirez	Galvez; Louie Haze	3:45
Total length:				76:04

Deluxe edition
No.	Title	Writer(s)	Producer(s)	Length
1.	"Shimmy" (featuring Doja Cat)	Carter; Amala Ratna Dlamini; Aleicia Nicole; Simon Plummer; Donny Flores; Kandace Ferrel; Theron Thomas; Lukasz Gottwald; Hamlin; Ogren; Robert Diggs; Russell Jones	Loctor Duke; B Ham; Ogren	2:49
2.	"Help" (featuring Tory Lanez)	Carter; Daystar Peterson; Samuel Jimenez; Norman Whitfield	Smash David	2:24
3.	"Big Worm"	Carter; Rockamore; Theo. Thomas; Reese; Mark Mbogo	Rockamore; Stonii; Bobby Keyz; Dunk Rock	3:11
4.	"Multiple Flows" (with Lil Uzi Vert)	Carter; Symere Woods; Brandon Veal; Samuel Nordqvist	Brandon Finessin; LostKidSamy	3:56
5.	"Happen To You"	Carter; Rockamore; Theo. Thomas; Reese; Caleb Mclean; Jaucquez Lowe	Rockamore; Stonii; Bobby Keyz	4:01
6.	"Russian Roulette" (featuring Benny the Butcher and Conway the Machine)	Carter; Jeremie Pennick; Demond Price; Rob Curti; Nathaniel Levingston	Swede; Manny	4:10
7.	"Love You Fuck You" (with Jessie Reyez)	Carter; Jessie Reyez; Harleaux; Fitch	MonstaBeatz	3:17
8.	"All The Dogs"	Carter; Jefferson; Ginn	R!O; Kamo	3:07
Total length:				26:55

Notes

- ^{^[a]} signifies a co-producer
- ^{^[b]} signifies an additional producer
- ^{^[c]} signifies an uncredited co-producer
- "Dreams" features additional vocals by Ben Burgess
- "Get Outta My Head" samples "The Boy With The Black Eyes" by XXXTentacion

Sample credits

- "Mahogany" contains samples from "Bass Song", written and performed by Eryn Kane.
- "Clap for Em" contains samples from "Drag Rap (Triggerman)", written by Orville Hall and Phillip Price, as performed by The Showboys.
- "Harden" contains samples from "Love Me or Leave Me", written by Donald Breedlove, Herb Pilhofer and Napoleon Crayton, as performed by Band of Thieves. Found and cleared through Tracklib.

== Personnel ==
Musicians

- Jonathan Buice – string arranger (track 1), keyboards (track 1)
- Memru Renjaan – guitar (track 1), electric bass (track 1)

Technical

- Matthew Testa – engineering (tracks 1–5, 7, 8, 10, 12, 15–20, 23, 24)
- Manny Galvez – engineering (tracks 1–7, 9–16, 18, 20–24)
- Jeff Edwards – engineering (tracks 8, 9, 13)
- Mailbox – engineering (track 10)
- EJ – engineering (tracks 11, 22)
- Chef – engineering (track 14)
- Steven McDowell – engineering (tracks 17, 21)
- Jason Delattiboudere – recording assistant (tracks 1–3, 5–24), remix engineering assistant (track 4)
- Patrick Kehrier – recording assistant (tracks 6, 10, 19)
- Eddie Taylor – recording assistant (track 17)
- Raymond Auzenne – recording arranger (track 19)
- Fabian Marasciullo – mixing (all tracks)
- Thomas McLaren – mixing assistant (track 1–17, 19–24)
- Morgan David – mixing assistant (track 18)
- Robert Soukiasyan – additional mixing (track 18)

== Charts ==
=== Weekly charts ===
Chart performance for Funeral
Chart (2020)	Peak position
Australian Albums (ARIA)	68
Belgian Albums (Ultratop Flanders)	91
Canadian Albums (Billboard)	5
Dutch Albums (Album Top 100)	35
French Albums (SNEP)	110
Irish Albums (IRMA)	73
Norwegian Albums (VG-lista)	29
Swiss Albums (Schweizer Hitparade)	29
UK Albums (Official Charts)	61
US Billboard 200	1
US Top R&B/Hip-Hop Albums (Billboard)	1

=== Year-end charts ===
2020 year-end chart performance for Funeral
Chart (2020)	Position
US Billboard 200	127
US Top R&B/Hip-Hop Albums (Billboard)	54
