= Let Me Down Slowly =

- Duet version cover

Single by Alec Benjamin

from the album Narrated for You
- Released: May 25, 2018
- Genre: Pop
- Length: 2:49
- Label: Atlantic
- Songwriters: Alec Benjamin; Nolan Lambroza; Michael Pollack
- Producers: Sir Nolan; Aaron Zuckerman

Alec Benjamin singles chronology
"I Built a Friend" (2017)	"Let Me Down Slowly" (2018)	"Boy in the Bubble" (2018)

Alessia Cara singles chronology
"Trust My Lonely" (2018)	"Let Me Down Slowly" (2019)	"Out of Love" (2019)

Alternative cover
- Single cover for Benjamin's solo version

Music video
- "Let Me Down Slowly" (Solo Version) on YouTube "Let Me Down Slowly" (Duet Version) on YouTube

"Let Me Down Slowly" is a song by American singer-songwriter Alec Benjamin, originally released as a solo version in 2018 and included on his mixtape Narrated for You before being re-released as a duet with Canadian singer-songwriter Alessia Cara in early 2019. Billboard called the track Benjamin's "vulnerable breakout hit".

== Background ==
Benjamin wrote the song in 2017 about an experience with an ex-girlfriend. It was one of the songs that Atlantic Records heard before signing him. The song was produced by Sir Nolan, with additional production by Aaron Zuckerman, and co-written by Benjamin with Michael Pollack and Sir Nolan.

== Music videos ==
The music video for the solo version was released on June 4, 2018, and for the duet version on February 6, 2019. Benjamin and Cara then made a video for an acoustic version of the song, which was released two weeks later.

The video for the solo version revolves around a woman falling out with her lover, and later raiding a convenience store. The video ends with them reconciling, just as the police arrive. Benjamin, who appears as a bystander throughout the video but provided no creative input, denounced the video as he felt it did not reflect the song's theme. The video for the duet version features Benjamin and Cara singing their verses alone in different locations, intercut with scenes of couples embracing.

== Track listing ==
- Digital download
1. "Let Me Down Slowly" – 2:49
- Digital download
1. "Let Me Down Slowly" (featuring Alessia Cara) – 2:49

== Charts ==
=== Weekly charts ===
2018–2020 Weekly chart performance for "Let Me Down Slowly"
Chart (2018–2020)	Peak position
Australia (ARIA)	56
Austria (Ö3 Austria Top 40)	47
Belgium (Ultratop 50 Flanders)	4
Belgium (Ultratop 50 Wallonia)	7
Canada Hot 100 (Billboard)	49
Czech Republic Airplay (ČNS IFPI)	1
Czech Republic Singles Digital (ČNS IFPI)	2
Denmark (Tracklisten)	6
Finland (Suomen virallinen lista)	6
France (SNEP)	16
Germany (GfK)	40
Hungary (Stream Top 40)	17
Ireland (IRMA)	17
Italy (FIMI)	54
Latvia (LaIPA)	11
Lithuania (AGATA)	13
Malaysia (RIM)	17
Netherlands (Dutch Top 40)	19
Netherlands (Single Top 100)	22
New Zealand (Recorded Music NZ)	23
Norway (VG-lista)	6
Portugal (AFP)	12
Romania (Airplay 100)	1
Scottish Singles Sales (Official Charts)	41
Singapore (RIAS)	30
Slovakia Singles Digital (ČNS IFPI)	19
Slovenia (SloTop50)	17
Spain (Promusicae)	94
Sweden (Sverigetopplistan)	38
Switzerland (Schweizer Hitparade)	20
Ukraine Airplay (TopHit)	171
UK Singles (Official Charts)	31
US Billboard Hot 100	79

2023 Weekly chart performance for "Let Me Down Slowly"
Chart (2023)	Peak position
Moldova Airplay (TopHit)	161
Romania Airplay (TopHit)	68

2024 Weekly chart performance for "Let Me Down Slowly"
Chart (2024)	Peak position
Romania Airplay (TopHit)	78

2025 weekly chart performance for "Let Me Down Slowly"
Chart (2025)	Peak position
Moldova Airplay (TopHit)	64

=== Monthly charts ===
2023 Monthly chart performance for "Let Me Down Slowly"
Chart (2023)	Peak position
Romania Airplay (TopHit)	91

2024 Monthly chart performance for "Let Me Down Slowly"
Chart (2024)	Peak position
Romania Airplay (TopHit)	85

2025 Monthly chart performance for "Let Me Down Slowly"
Chart (2025)	Peak position
Romania Airplay (TopHit)	98

=== Year-end charts ===
2019 Year-end chart performance for "Let Me Down Slowly"
Chart (2019)	Position
Austria (Ö3 Austria Top 40)	69
Belgium (Ultratop Flanders)	14
Belgium (Ultratop Wallonia)	23
Canada (Canadian Hot 100)	98
Denmark (Tracklisten)	23
France (SNEP)	41
Germany (Official German Charts)	55
Latvia (LAIPA)	25
Netherlands (Dutch Top 40)	76
Netherlands (Single Top 100)	60
New Zealand (Recorded Music NZ)	48
Portugal (AFP)	29
Romania (Airplay 100)	60
Sweden (Sverigetopplistan)	83
Switzerland (Schweizer Hitparade)	21

2020 Year-end chart performance for "Let Me Down Slowly"
Chart (2020)	Position
Romania (Airplay 100)	9

2023 Year-end chart performance for "Let Me Down Slowly"
Chart (2023)	Position
Romania Airplay (TopHit)	154

== Certifications ==
Certifications for "Let Me Down Slowly"
Region	Certification	Certified units/sales
Australia (ARIA)	2× Platinum	140,000^{‡}
Austria (IFPI Austria)	3× Platinum	90,000^{‡}
Belgium (BRMA)	2× Platinum	80,000^{‡}
Brazil (Pro-Música Brasil)	2× Platinum	80,000^{‡}
Canada (Music Canada)	4× Platinum	320,000^{‡}
Denmark (IFPI Danmark)	3× Platinum	270,000^{‡}
France (SNEP)	Diamond	333,333^{‡}
Germany (BVMI)	Platinum	600,000^{‡}
Italy (FIMI)	Platinum	70,000^{‡}
Netherlands (NVPI)	Platinum	80,000^{‡}
New Zealand (RMNZ)	4× Platinum	120,000^{‡}
Norway (IFPI Norway)	2× Platinum	120,000^{‡}
Poland (ZPAV)	Diamond	250,000^{‡}
Portugal (AFP)	2× Platinum	20,000^{‡}
Spain (Promusicae)	Platinum	60,000^{‡}
Switzerland (IFPI Switzerland)	2× Platinum	40,000^{‡}
United Kingdom (BPI)	Platinum	600,000^{‡}
United States (RIAA)	4× Platinum	4,000,000^{‡}
^{‡} Sales+streaming figures based on certification alone.

== See also ==
- List of Airplay 100 number ones of the 2020s
