= Tyler Herro (song) =

2020 single by Jack Harlow

Single by Jack Harlow

from the album Thats What They All Say
- Released: October 22, 2020
- Genre: Hip hop; trap
- Length: 2:36
- Label: Generation Now; Atlantic
- Songwriters: Jack Harlow; Jahaan Sweet; Matthew Samuels; Scott Storch; Sean Seaton
- Producers: Boi-1da; Storch; Neenyo; Sweet

Jack Harlow singles chronology
"Tap In (Remix)" (2020)	"Tyler Herro" (2020)	"Way Out" (2020)

Music video
- "Tyler Herro" on YouTube

"Tyler Herro" is a song by American rapper Jack Harlow. It was released on October 22, 2020, by Generation Now/Atlantic Records, as a lead single from his debut studio album Thats What They All Say (2020). The song pays tribute to the basketball player of the same name and was produced by Boi-1da and Scott Storch, with additional production from Neenyo and Jahaan Sweet.

== Composition and lyrics ==
The song features a "bass-heavy midtempo groove that highlights Harlow's catchy flows". Jack Harlow pays homage to the NBA player Tyler Herro, a friend of his, rapping: "My homeboy Tyler he play in South Beach / He told me this summer he gon' fix my jumper". He also mentions having made a new group of friends: "I brought a gang to the party with me / Five white boys, but they not NSYNC".

== Music video ==
The music video was released alongside the single. It was directed by Ace Pro and filmed in the home of basketball player Lou Williams in Atlanta. The video begins with a child resembling Jack Harlow getting off the school bus and running towards his home. It then cuts to Harlow enjoying his life in fame. He shoots hoops with Tyler Herro, goes through a "wardrobe change", and is also seen on a bed with two girls having a pillow fight. Harlow also introduces his rap group The Homies. The visual features a cameo from comedian Druski.

== Charts ==
=== Weekly charts ===
Weekly chart performance of "Tyler Herro"
Chart (2020–2021)	Peak position
Australia (ARIA)	68
Belgium (Ultratip Bubbling Under Flanders)	36
Canada Hot 100 (Billboard)	27
Global 200 (Billboard)	39
Greece (IFPI)	24
Ireland (IRMA)	38
Lithuania (AGATA)	46
New Zealand Hot Singles (RMNZ)	5
Portugal (AFP)	89
Switzerland (Schweizer Hitparade)	82
US Billboard Hot 100	34
US Hot R&B/Hip-Hop Songs (Billboard)	11
US Rhythmic Airplay (Billboard)	14
US Rolling Stone Top 100	10

=== Year-end charts ===
Year-end chart performance for "Tyler Herro"
Chart (2021)	Position
US Hot R&B/Hip-Hop Songs (Billboard)	50

== Certifications ==
Certifications for "Tyler Herro"
Region	Certification	Certified units/sales
Canada (Music Canada)	4× Platinum	320,000^{‡}
Denmark (IFPI Danmark)	Gold	45,000^{‡}
Portugal (AFP)	Gold	5,000^{‡}
New Zealand (RMNZ)	Platinum	30,000^{‡}
United Kingdom (BPI)	Silver	200,000^{‡}
United States (RIAA)	2× Platinum	2,000,000^{‡}
^{‡} Sales+streaming figures based on certification alone.
