= These Two Windows =

Studio album by Alec Benjamin
- Released: May 29, 2020
- Genre: Pop
- Length: 27:57
- Label: Warner
- Producer: Alex Hope; Charlie Handsome; Jonathan Hoskins; Sir Nolan; Johan Lenox; John Cunningham; Simon Says

Alec Benjamin chronology
Narrated for You (2018)	These Two Windows (2020)	(Un)Commentary (2022)

Singles from These Two Windows
- 1. "Must Have Been the Wind" Released: June 13, 2019; 2. "Jesus in LA" Released: July 16, 2019; 3. "Mind Is a Prison" Released: December 12, 2019; 4. "Demons" Released: January 17, 2020; 5. "Oh My God" Released: February 13, 2020; 6. "The Book of You & I" Released: March 5, 2020; 7. "Match in the Rain" Released: May 29, 2020

These Two Windows is the debut studio album by the American singer Alec Benjamin. It was released by Warner Music on May 29, 2020. It reached number 75 on the Billboard 200.

== Commercial performance ==
On the UK Albums Chart, These Two Windows debuted at No. 52 with 1,677 sales units, marking Benjamin's first entry on that chart.

== Track listing ==
These Two Windows track listing
No.	Title	Writer(s)	Producer(s)	Length
1.	"Mind Is a Prison"	Alec Benjamin; Alex Hope	Alex Hope	2:42
2.	"Demons"	Benjamin; Ryan Vojtesak; Jonathan Hoskins	Charlie Handsome; Hoskins	2:42
3.	"Oh My God"	Benjamin; Julie Frost; Nolan Lambroza	Sir Nolan; Johan Lenox	3:07
4.	"The Book of You & I"	Benjamin; Hope	Hope	3:27
5.	"Match in the Rain"	Benjamin; Scott Friedman; Hope	Hope	2:39
6.	"Jesus in LA"	Benjamin; Martin Terefe	John Cunningham	2:51
7.	"I'm Not a Cynic"	Benjamin; Hope	Hope	2:16
8.	"Alamo"	Benjamin; Friedman; Lambroza; Nathan Fertig; Russell Chell; Simon Rosen; David Biral; Denzel Baptiste	Sir Nolan; Simon Says	2:25
9.	"Must Have Been the Wind"	Benjamin; Hope	Hope	2:57
10.	"Just Like You"	Benjamin; John Cunningham	Cunningham	2:50
Total length:				27:53

Japan bonus track
No.	Title	Writer(s)	Producer(s)	Length
11.	"Six Feet Apart"	Benjamin; Dan Wilson	Benjamin; Nathan Fatig	2:54
Total length:				30:55

== Charts ==
Chart performance for These Two Windows
Chart (2020)	Peak position
Australian Albums (ARIA)	70
Belgian Albums (Ultratop Flanders)	99
Dutch Albums (Album Top 100)	42
Lithuanian Albums (AGATA)	80
Scottish Albums (OCC)	15
Swiss Albums (Schweizer Hitparade)	75
UK Albums (OCC)	52
US Billboard 200	75
