= (Un)Commentary =

Studio album by Alec Benjamin
- Released: April 15, 2022
- Length: 34:18
- Label: Elektra
- Producer: Aaron Zuckerman; Lenno; Sam de Jong; Sir Nolan; SixTwentySix Productions; Steven Martinez; Zach Skelton

Alec Benjamin chronology
| These Two Windows (2020) | (Un)Commentary (2022) | 12 Notes (2024) |

Singles from (Un)Commentary
- 1. "The Way You Felt" Released: April 30, 2021; 2. "Older" Released: September 17, 2021; 3. "Shadow of Mine" Released: February 24, 2022; 4. "Speakers" Released: April 14, 2022; 5. "Devil Doesn't Bargain" Released: June 10, 2022

(Un)Commentary is the second and major-label debut studio album by American singer-songwriter Alec Benjamin, released on April 15, 2022, through Elektra Records. It produced five singles, including its only charting single, "Devil Doesn't Bargain". Benjamin embarked on an international tour throughout 2022 in support of the album.

== Critical reception ==
Professional ratings
Review scores
| Source | Rating |
|---|---|
| PopMatters | 8/10 |

Matthew Dwyer of PopMatters wrote that "Benjamin's love for contemplation is evident in his music. He magnifies thought experiments into catchy parables, animated by slick studio production and acoustic instrumentation", and that his "autobiographical storytelling is sharp throughout the album". Dwyer concluded that "his eye for detail and unique storytelling style may be uncommon in pop right now, [but] it's clear he'll be setting trends for years to come".

== Track listing ==
(Un)Commentary track listing
| No. | Title | Writer(s) | Length |
|---|---|---|---|
| 1. | "Dopamine Addict" | Nolan Lambroza, Sam Roman, Alec Benjamin, Justin Lucas | 2:24 |
| 2. | "Hammers" | Lambroza, Benjamin, Lucas, Nathan Fertig, Eli Teplin | 3:00 |
| 3. | "The Way You Felt" | Lambroza, Benjamin, Lucas, Roman, Lenno Linjama | 3:03 |
| 4. | "Shadow of Mine" | Lambroza, Benjamin, Lucas, Dan Wilson | 2:45 |
| 5. | "Speakers" | Benjamin, Wilson | 2:39 |
| 6. | "Hill I Will Die On" | Benjamin, Sacha Skarbek | 2:47 |
| 7. | "Hipocrite" | Benjamin, Roman | 2:16 |
| 8. | "Nancy Got a Haircut" | Benjamin, Roman | 1:58 |
| 9. | "Nuance" | Lambroza, Benjamin, Roman, Lucas, Aaron Zuckerman | 2:52 |
| 10. | "Devil Doesn't Bargain" | Lambroza, Benjamin, Lucas, Zuckerman | 2:43 |
| 11. | "Deniro" | Benjamin, Wilson | 2:21 |
| 12. | "Older" | Benjamin, Zack Skelton, Charlie Puth, Ryan Tedder | 2:44 |
| 13. | "One Wrong Turn" | Lambroza, Benjamin, Lucas, David Hodges | 2:46 |
| Total length: | | | 34:18 |

== Charts ==
Chart performance for (Un)Commentary
| Chart (2022) | Peak position |
|---|---|
| Dutch Albums (Album Top 100) | 84 |
| Swiss Albums (Schweizer Hitparade) | 62 |
| UK Album Downloads (OCC) | 47 |
