= Alec Benjamin =

American singer and songwriter (born 1994)

Alec Shane Benjamin
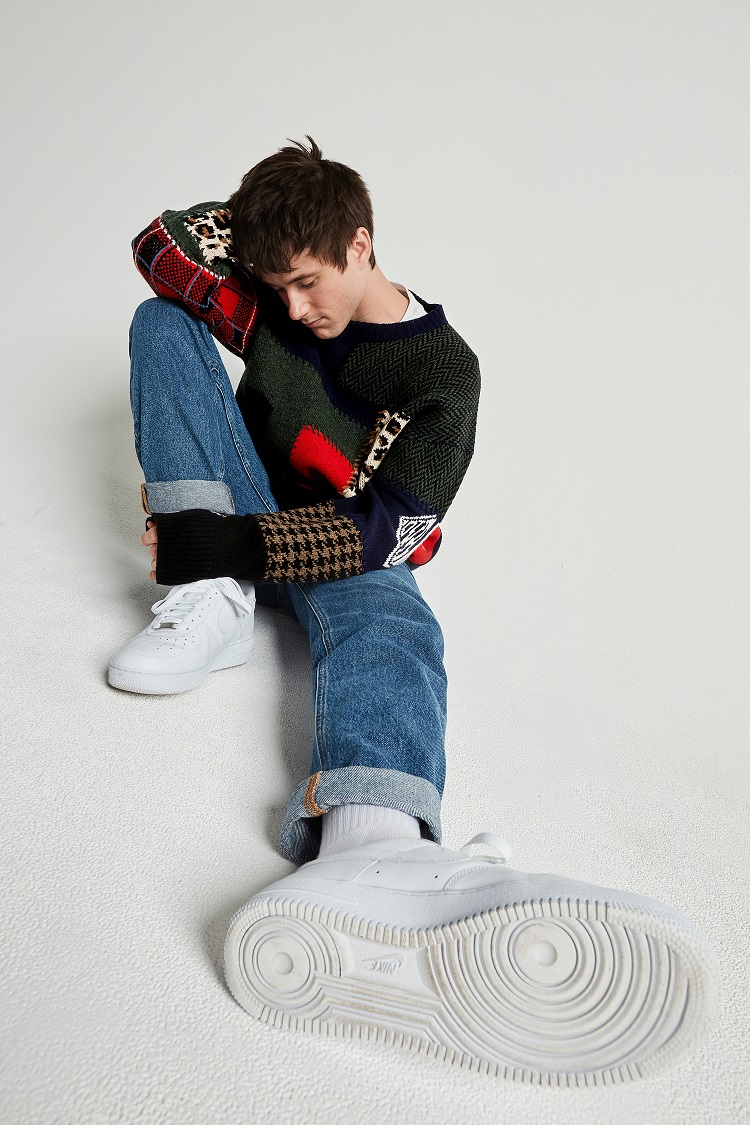
- Press photo of Benjamin for Atlantic Records in 2019

Background information
- Born: Alec S. Benjamin; 1994 or 1995 (age 31–32); Phoenix, Arizona, U.S.
- Genres: Indie; folk-pop; alt-pop
- Occupations: Singer; songwriter; musician
- Instruments: Vocals; guitar; piano
- Years active: 2014–present
- Labels: Columbia; Atlantic; Elektra
- Website: alecbenjamin.com

Alec Shane Benjamin (born 1994 or 1995) is an American singer, songwriter, and musician, born and raised in Phoenix, Arizona. His 2018 single "Let Me Down Slowly", from his debut mixtape Narrated for You, became his breakthrough and reached the top 40 in over 25 countries.

== Life and career ==
Alec Shane Benjamin was born in 1994 or 1995, in Phoenix, Arizona, where he and his sister were raised. As a teenager, in the 2000s he moved to Los Angeles, California. He started writing songs at 13 and learning guitar in high school, and released his first extended play (EP) America in 2013.

Benjamin signed with Columbia Records and enrolled at the University of Southern California. However, Columbia Records ended their partnership weeks after he submitted his album. After the termination of his partnership with Columbia, he went on a self-funded tour in Europe, opening for Marina Kaye in France and Lea in Germany. He promoted his music by performing in parking lots outside concert venues and handing out business cards to passersby.

Benjamin's debut 12-song mixtape Narrated for You was released on November 16, 2018. It features the songs "If We Have Each Other”, "Water Fountain," "Annabelle's Homework," and "Let Me Down Slowly". On February 1, 2018, Merrick Hanna auditioned for America’s Got Talent, using Benjamin's song "I built a friend". This would help Benjamin gain traction and soon after he was signed on with Atlantic Records. "Let Me Down Slowly" was later re-released as a single with Alessia Cara. While promoting the mixtape, he started creating his "Can I Sing for You?" series of videos on YouTube, in which he performs acoustic versions of his songs for people in public.

Benjamin's debut studio album These Two Windows was released on May 29, 2020. It peaked at number 8 on Billboard's Top Album Sales chart. His second album, (Un)Commentary, followed on April 15, 2022.

He occasionally records Mandarin versions of his songs, having been inspired by his father, who had incorporated Chinese culture into his work as a medical doctor through acupuncture and eastern medicine. He collaborated with popular Chinese actress Zhao Lusi on a Mandarin version of "Water Fountain".

As of November 2025, Benjamin's total of monthly listeners was estimated to average 12,992,615. Alec Benjamin’s net worth is estimated to be around $4 million.

== Influences ==
Benjamin has cited influences such as Eminem, John Mayer, Jason Mraz, Paul Simon, Joe Venneri and Chris Martin of Coldplay. He has also expressed admiration for Kendrick Lamar and classic singer-songwriters such as Joni Mitchell, Leonard Cohen, Carole King, and Jackson Browne.

== Discography ==
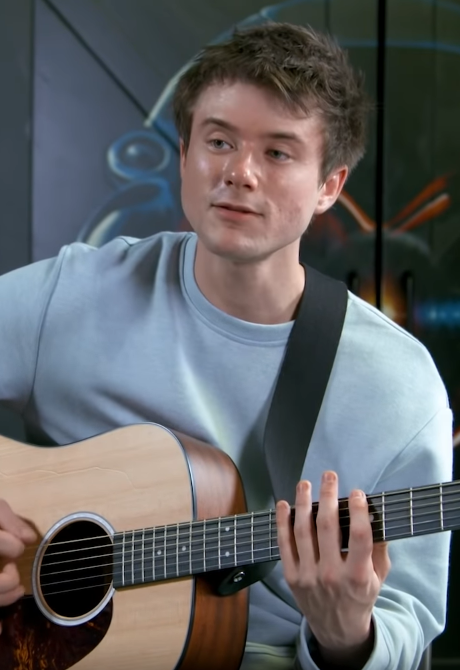
Benjamin performing his song Jesus in LA in 2019

=== Studio albums ===
List of studio albums, with selected details and chart positions
Title	Details	Peak chart positions					
Title	Details	US	AUS	BEL (FL)	NLD	SWI	UK
Narrated for You	Released: November 16, 2018; Label: Atlantic; Format: Vinyl, Digital download, streaming	127	—	100	59	—	25
These Two Windows	Released: May 29, 2020; Label: Atlantic; Format: CD, Digital download, streaming	75	22	99	42	27	52
(Un)Commentary	Released: April 15, 2022; Label: Elektra; Format: CD, Digital download, streaming	59	—	—	84	62	—
12 Notes	Released: May 10, 2024; Label: Elektra; Format: LP, Digital download, streaming	—	—	—	—	—	—
"—" denotes an album that did not chart or was not released in that territory.

=== Mixtapes ===
List of mixtapes, with selected details, chart positions and certifications
Title	Details	Peak chart positions									Certifications
Title	Details	US	US Heat.	BEL (FL)	CAN	DEN	FRA	NLD	NOR	SWE	Certifications
Narrated for You	Released: November 16, 2018; Label: Atlantic; Format: Digital download, LP	127	3	121	62	10	130	59	5	20	RIAA: Platinum; BPI: Gold; IFPI DEN: Platinum; IFPI NOR: Platinum; MC: Platinum; SNEP: Gold

=== Extended plays ===
Extended play, with selected details
Title	Details
America	Released: April 22, 2013; Label: White Rope; Format: Digital download

=== Singles ===
==== As lead artist ====
List of singles as lead artist, with selected chart positions and certifications
Title	Year	Peak chart positions										Certifications	Album
Title	Year	US	AUS	BEL (FL)	CAN	DEN	IRE	NLD	NOR	SWI	UK	Certifications	Album
"Paper Crown"	2014	—	—	—	—	—	—	—	—	—	—		Non-album singles
"End of the Summer"	2016	—	—	—	—	—	—	—	—	—	—		Non-album singles
"The Way to Nowhere"	2016	—	—	—	—	—	—	—	—	—	—		Non-album singles
"I Built a Friend"	2017	—	—	—	—	—	—	—	—	—	—		Non-album singles
"Let Me Down Slowly" (solo or featuring Alessia Cara)	2018	79	25	4	55	7	17	22	6	20	31	RIAA: 5× Platinum; ARIA: 2× Platinum; BEA: 2× Platinum; BPI: Platinum; IFPI DEN: 2× Platinum; IFPI NOR: 2× Platinum; IFPI SWI: 2× Platinum; MC: 4× Platinum; NVPI: Platinum	Narrated for You
"Boy in the Bubble"	2018	—	—	—	—	—	—	—	—	—	—	RIAA: Gold; MC: Gold	Narrated for You
"If We Have Each Other"	2018	—	—	—	—	—	—	—	—	—	—	RIAA: 2× Platinum; BPI: Silver; IFPI DEN: Gold; MC: Platinum	Narrated for You
"Death of a Hero"	2018	—	—	—	—	—	—	—	—	—	—		Narrated for You
"Outrunning Karma"	2018	—	—	—	—	—	—	—	—	—	—	RIAA: Gold	Narrated for You
"1994"	2018	—	—	—	—	—	—	—	—	—	—		Narrated for You
"Must Have Been the Wind"	2019	—	—	—	—	—	—	—	—	—	—	RIAA: Gold; MC: Gold	These Two Windows
"Jesus in LA"	2019	—	—	—	—	—	—	—	—	—	—	RIAA: Gold; MC: Gold	These Two Windows
"Mind Is a Prison"	2019	—	—	—	—	—	—	—	—	—	—	RIAA: Gold	These Two Windows
"Demons"	2020	—	—	— (Note: "Demons" did not enter the Ultratop 50 chart, but peaked at number 5 on the Ultratip chart.)	—	—	—	—	—	—	—		These Two Windows
"Oh My God"	2020	— (Note: "Oh My God" did not enter the Billboard Hot 100 chart, but peaked at number 32 on the Pop Songs chart and at number 26 on the Adult Pop Songs chart.)	—	— (Note: "Oh My God" did not enter the Ultratop 50 chart, but peaked at number 49 on the Ultratip chart.)	—	—	—	—	—	—	—		These Two Windows
"The Book of You & I"	2020	—	—	—	—	—	—	—	—	—	—		These Two Windows
"Six Feet Apart"	2020	—	—	—	—	—	—	—	—	—	—		Non-album single
"Match in the Rain"	2020	—	—	—	—	—	—	—	—	—	—		These Two Windows
"I Built a Friend (2020)"	2020	—	—	—	—	—	—	—	—	—	—		Non-album single
"The Way You Felt"	2021	—	—	—	—	—	—	—	—	—	—		(Un)Commentary
"Change My Clothes" (with Dream)	2021	—	—	—	—	—	70	—	—	—	67		Non-album single
"Older"	2021	—	—	—	—	—	—	—	—	—	—		(Un)Commentary
"Shadow of Mine"	2022	—	—	—	—	—	—	—	—	—	—		(Un)Commentary
"Speakers"	2022	—	—	—	—	—	—	—	—	—	—		(Un)Commentary
"Devil Doesn't Bargain"	2022	—	—	—	—	—	—	— (Note: "Devil Doesn't Bargain" did not enter the Single Top 100, but reached number 11 on its extension, the Single Tip.)	30	—	95	RIAA: Platinum; MC: Platinum	(Un)Commentary
"Different Kind of Beautiful"	2023	—	—	—	—	—	—	—	—	—	—		12 Notes
"I Sent My Therapist to Therapy"	2023	—	—	—	—	—	—	—	—	—	—		12 Notes
"Pick Me"	2024	—	—	—	—	—	—	—	—	—	—		12 Notes
"King Size Bed"	2024	—	—	—	—	—	—	—	—	—	—		12 Notes
"Found You First"	2024	—	—	—	—	—	—	—	—	—	—		12 Notes
"The Knife in My Back"	2025	—	—	—	—	—	—	—	—	—	—		
"Pretending"	2025	—	—	—	—	—	—	—	—	—	—		
"Follow Me"	2026	—	—	—	—	—	—	—	—	—	—		
"Without My Strings"	2026	—	—	—	—	—	—	—	—	—	—		
"—" denotes a single that did not chart or was not released in that territory.

==== As featured artist ====
List of singles as featured artist, with year, released and album name shown
Title	Year	Album
"New York Soul, Pt. II" (Jon Bellion featuring Alec Benjamin)	2016	The Human Condition
"Eyes Blue Like the Atlantic, Pt. 2" (Sista Prod featuring Powfu, Alec Benjamin, and Rxseboy)	2020	Non-album single
"Finding Her" (Kushagra featuring Alec Benjamin”	2025	Non-album single
"Emotions"" (Wendy featuring Alec Benjamin)	2026	Non-album single

=== Other certified songs ===
List of other certified songs, with selected certifications
Title	Year	Certifications	Album
"Water Fountain"	2018	RIAA: 2× Platinum; BPI: Silver; IFPI DEN: Gold; MC: 2× Platinum	Narrated for You
"If I Killed Someone for You"	2018	RIAA: Platinum	Narrated for You
