= I Do It (Lil Wayne song) =

Song by American rapper Lil Wayne

Single by Lil Wayne featuring Big Sean and Lil Baby

from the album Funeral
- Released: January 31, 2020
- Genre: Hip hop; trap
- Length: 3:04
- Label: Young Money; Republic
- Songwriter(s): Dwayne Carter; Sean Anderson; Dominique Jones; Ryan Vojtesak; Masamune Kudo
- Producer(s): Rex Kudo; Charlie Handsome

Lil Wayne singles chronology
"Gimme Brain" (2019)	"I Do It" (2020)	"Thug Life" (2020)

Big Sean singles chronology
"None of Your Concern" (2019)	"I Do It" (2020)	"Deep Reverence" (2020)

Lil Baby singles chronology
"1st N 3rd" (2020)	"I Do It" (2020)	"Life Is Good (Remix)" (2020)

"I Do It" is a song by American rapper Lil Wayne featuring fellow American rappers Big Sean and Lil Baby, from Wayne's thirteenth studio album Funeral (2020). The song peaked at number 33 on the Billboard Hot 100, making Lil Wayne the artist with the second-most top 40 hits, being his 82nd.

== Background ==
Lil Wayne first announced his collaboration with Lil Baby and the process of working with him in a July 2019 interview with XXL.

The song was released as the lead single from Lil Wayne's thirteenth studio album Funeral on January 31, 2020. Three hours before it was officially released, Wayne posted a snippet of the track on Instagram.

== Charts ==
Chart (2020)	Peak position
New Zealand Hot Singles (RMNZ)	14
Canada (Canadian Hot 100)	63
US Billboard Hot 100	33
