= Narrated for You =

Mixtape by Alec Benjamin
- Released: November 16, 2018
- Length: 36:56
- Label: Atlantic
- Producer: Sir Nolan

Alec Benjamin chronology
America (2013)	Narrated for You (2018)	These Two Windows (2020)

Singles from Narrated for You
- 1. "Let Me Down Slowly" Released: May 25, 2018; 2. "Boy in the Bubble" Released: June 22, 2018; 3. "If We Have Each Other" Released: July 26, 2018; 4. "Death of a Hero" Released: August 23, 2018; 5. "Outrunning Karma" Released: September 27, 2018; 6. "1994" Released: November 1, 2018

Narrated for You is the debut mixtape by American singer Alec Benjamin, released through Atlantic Records on November 16, 2018. Benjamin wrote most of the tracks about relationships and lessons he learned growing up. The mixtape was preceded by the release of six singles, including Benjamin's most successful song, "Let Me Down Slowly", which he later re-recorded in a version featuring Alessia Cara. The mixtape charted across Europe and in the US, where it reached number 127 on the Billboard 200.

== Track listing ==
Narrated for You track listing
No.	Title	Length
1.	"If We Have Each Other"	3:01
2.	"Water Fountain"	3:38
3.	"Annabelle's Homework"	3:12
4.	"Let Me Down Slowly"	2:49
5.	"Swim"	2:24
6.	"Boy in the Bubble"	3:01
7.	"Steve"	2:53
8.	"Gotta Be a Reason"	3:30
9.	"Outrunning Karma"	3:08
10.	"If I Killed Someone for You"	3:05
11.	"Death of a Hero"	3:11
12.	"1994"	3:04
Total length:		36:56

== Charts ==
=== Weekly charts ===
Weekly chart performance for Narrated for You
Chart (2019)	Peak position
Belgian Albums (Ultratop Flanders)	121
Canadian Albums (Billboard)	62
Danish Albums (Hitlisten)	10
Dutch Albums (Album Top 100)	59
Finnish Albums (Suomen virallinen lista)	18
French Albums (SNEP)	130
Norwegian Albums (VG-lista)	5
Swedish Albums (Sverigetopplistan)	20
US Billboard 200	127

=== Year-end charts ===
Year-end chart performance for Narrated for You
Chart (2019)	Position
Danish Albums (Hitlisten)	54
Dutch Albums (Album Top 100)	85
Norwegian Albums (VG-lista)	15
Swedish Albums (Sverigetopplistan)	58

== Certifications ==
Certifications for Narrated for You
Region	Certification	Certified units/sales
Austria (IFPI Austria)	Gold	7,500^{‡}
Canada (Music Canada)	Platinum	80,000^{‡}
Denmark (IFPI Danmark)	Platinum	20,000^{‡}
France (SNEP)	Gold	50,000^{‡}
New Zealand (RMNZ)	Gold	7,500^{‡}
Norway (IFPI Norway)	Platinum	20,000^{‡}
Poland (ZPAV)	Gold	10,000^{‡}
Singapore (RIAS)	Gold	5,000^{*}
United Kingdom (BPI)	Gold	100,000^{‡}
United States (RIAA)	Platinum	1,000,000^{‡}
^{*} Sales figures based on certification alone.^{‡} Sales+streaming figures based on certification alone.
